= 2020–21 Al-Duhail SC season =

Al-Duhail
2020–21 season
- Chairman: Khalifa bin Hamad bin Khalifa Al Thani
- Head coach: Walid Regragui (until 30 September 2020); Sabri Lamouchi (from 14 October 2020)
- Stadium: Abdullah bin Khalifa Stadium
- Qatar Stars League: Runners–up
- Emir of Qatar Cup: 2020: Semi-finals; 2021: Semi-finals
- Crown Prince Cup: Runners–up
- Champions League: 2020: Group stage 2021: Group stage
- Club World Cup: Second round
- Top goalscorer: League: Dudu (14 goals); All: Michael Olunga (20 goals)
Home colours	Away colours

In the 2020–21 season, Al-Duhail is competing in the Qatar Stars League for the 10th season, as well as the Emir of Qatar Cup and the Champions League.

== Squad list ==
Players and squad numbers last updated on 3 September 2021.
Note: Flags indicate national team as has been defined under FIFA eligibility rules. Players may hold more than one non-FIFA nationality.

No.	Nat.	Position	Name	Date of birth (age)	Signed from
Goalkeepers
1	(Qatar)	GK	Mohammed Al-Bakri	28 March 1997 (aged 23)	(Qatar) Youth system
21	(Qatar)	GK	Salah Zakaria	24 April 1999 (aged 21)	(Qatar) Al-Wakrah
16	(Qatar)	GK	Khalifa Ababacar	7 July 1989 (aged 32)	(Qatar) Al Kharaitiyat
Defenders
3	(Qatar)	RB	Ali Malolah	26 February 1999 (aged 21)	(Qatar) Al-Wakrah
2	(Qatar)	CB	Mohammed Musa	23 March 1986 (aged 34)	(Qatar) Umm Salal
5	(Qatar)	CB / RB	Bassam Al-Rawi	16 December 1997 (aged 22)	(Qatar) Al-Rayyan
6	(Qatar)	CB	Ahmed Yasser	17 May 1994 (aged 26)	(Qatar) Aspire Academy
18	(Qatar)	LB	Sultan Al-Brake	7 April 1996 (aged 24)	(Qatar) Aspire Academy
4	(Morocco)	CB	Medhi Benatia	17 April 1987 (aged 34)	(Italy) Juventus
	(Iran)	RB	Ramin Rezaeian	21 March 1990 (aged 31)	(Qatar) Al Shahania
Midfielders
8	(Qatar)	DM	Luiz Júnior	13 January 1989 (aged 31)	(Brazil) Uniclinic
10	(Belgium)	LW	Edmilson	19 August 1994 (aged 26)	(Belgium) Standard Liège
12	(Qatar)	DM	Karim Boudiaf	16 September 1990 (aged 30)	(France) Nancy
14	(Qatar)	AM	Abdullah Al-Ahrak	10 May 1997 (aged 23)	(Spain) Cultural Leonesa
23	(Qatar)	DM	Assim Madibo	22 October 1996 (aged 23)	(Spain) Cultural Leonesa
22	(Qatar)	CM	Khalid Mohammed	7 June 2000 (aged 21)	(England) Leeds United
24	(Iran)	CM	Ali Karimi	11 February 1994 (aged 27)	Qatar SC
77	(Brazil)	LW	Dudu	7 January 1992 (aged 29)	(Brazil) Palmeiras
Forwards
7	(Qatar)	RW	Ismaeel Mohammad	5 April 1990 (aged 30)	(Qatar) El Jaish
19	(Qatar)	ST	Almoez Ali	19 August 1996 (aged 24)	(Spain) Cultural Leonesa
20	(Qatar)	LW	Ali Afif	20 January 1988 (aged 32)	(Qatar) Al Sadd SC
26	(Kenya)	ST	Michael Olunga	26 March 1994 (aged 26)	(Japan) Kashiwa Reysol
29	(Qatar)	ST	Mohammed Muntari	20 December 1993 (aged 26)	(Qatar) El Jaish

== Competitions ==
=== Overview ===
Competition	Record								Started round	Final position / round	First match	Last match
Competition	G	W	D	L	GF	GA	GD	Win %	Started round	Final position / round	First match	Last match
Qatar Stars League	22	15	2	5	53	25	+28	68.18	Matchday 1	Runners–up	3 September 2020	9 April 2021
2020 Emir of Qatar Cup	1	0	0	1	1	4	−3	0.00	Semi-finals		31 October 2020	
2021 Emir of Qatar Cup	3	2	0	1	9	2	+7	66.67	Round of 16	Semi-finals	25 January 2021	10 May 2021
Qatar Crown Prince Cup	2	1	0	1	2	3	−1	50.00	Semi-finals	Runners–up	18 February 2021	26 February 2021
2020 Champions League	4	2	0	2	5	6	−1	50.00	Group stage		15 September 2020	24 September 2020
2021 Champions League	6	2	3	1	11	9	+2	33.33	Group stage		15 April 2021	30 April 2021
FIFA Club World Cup	3	2	0	1	3	2	+1	66.67	First round	Fifth place	1 February 2021	7 February 2021
Total	41	24	5	12	84	51	+33	58.54				

Updated to match played 7 May 2021
Source: Competitions

=== Qatar Stars League ===
==== League table ====
Pos	Team	Pld	W	D	L	GF	GA	GD	Pts	Qualification or relegation
1	Al Sadd (C)	22	19	3	0	77	14	+63	60	Qualification for AFC Champions League group stage
2	Al Duhail	22	15	2	5	53	25	+28	47	Qualification for AFC Champions League group stage
3	Al-Rayyan	22	10	5	7	31	22	+9	35	Qualification for AFC Champions League group stage
4	Al-Gharafa	22	10	3	9	41	34	+7	33	Qualification for AFC Champions League play-off round
5	Al Ahli	22	10	3	9	28	38	−10	33	

Source: QSL, Soccerway
Rules for classification: 1) Points; 2) Goal difference; 3) Number of goals scored;
(C) Champions

==== Results summary ====
Overall								Home						Away					
Pld	W	D	L	GF	GA	GD	Pts	W	D	L	GF	GA	GD	W	D	L	GF	GA	GD
22	15	2	5	53	25	+28	47	7	0	3	29	11	+18	8	2	2	24	14	+10

Last updated: 10 April 2021.
Source: Competitive matches

==== Results by round ====
Round	1	2	3	4	5	6	7	8	9	10	11	12	13	14	15	16	17	18	19	20	21	22
Ground																						
Result																						
Position																						

Updated to match(es) played on 10 April 2021. Source: Competitive matches
A = Away; H = Home; W = Win; D = Draw; L = Loss

==== Matches ====
Win Draw Loss

4 September 2020 Round 1	Al-Duhail	3–0	Umm Salal	Doha
18:15	Luiz Júnior 5'; Muntari 36'; Ali Afif 90+2'	Report		Stadium: Abdullah bin Khalifa Stadium; Referee: Mohammed Al-Shammari

8 September 2020 Round 2	Al-Wakrah	1–0	Al-Duhail	Al-Rayyan
18:15	Benyettou 11'	Report		Stadium: Education City Stadium; Referee: Abdullah Al Athbah

21 October 2020 Round 3	Al-Duhail	1–3	Al Sadd SC	Doha
18:45	Dudu 86'	Report	Nam Tae-hee 22', 70'; Guilherme Torres 38'	Stadium: Abdullah bin Khalifa Stadium; Referee: Salman Ahmad Flahi

17 October 2020 Round 4	Al-Duhail	2–1	Qatar SC	Doha
17:30	Dudu 12'; Almoez Ali 39' (pen.)	Report	Abdulaziz Adel 48'	Stadium: Abdullah bin Khalifa Stadium; Referee: Saoud Al Athbah

25 October 2020 Round 5	Al-Rayyan	1–2	Al-Duhail	Doha
18:45	Brahimi 42'	Report	Dudu 68' (pen.); Rezaeian 90+3'	Stadium: Jassim Bin Hamad Stadium; Referee: Mohammed Al-Shammari

22 November 2020 Round 6	Al-Duhail	0–3	Al-Gharafa	Doha
16:30		Report	Moayad Hassan 41', 59'; Alaaeldin 87'	Stadium: Grand Hamad Stadium; Referee: Abdullah Al Athbah

27 November 2020 Round 7	Al-Duhail	4–1	Al Kharaitiyat	Doha
18:45	Almoez Ali 13', 40'; Rezaeian 37'; Khaled Mohammed 90+1'	Report	Khaldoun Moussa 55'	Stadium: Abdullah bin Khalifa Stadium; Referee: Hamad Al Subaie

8 December 2020 Round 8	Al-Duhail	1–2	Al-Sailiya	Doha
16:30	Dudu 90+4'	Report	Mohanad Ali 20'; Mbodji 38'	Stadium: Abdullah bin Khalifa Stadium; Referee: Youssef Alsharshani

13 December 2020 Round 9	Al-Duhail	2–0	Al-Arabi	Doha
18:45	Edmilson 32', 78'	Report		Stadium: Abdullah bin Khalifa Stadium; Referee: Mohammed Al-Shammari

22 December 2020 Round 10	Al-Duhail	6–1	Al-Khor	Doha
15:00	Muntari 5'; Edmilson 11', 74'; Dudu 60' (pen.); Al-Ahrak 80'; Ahmed Yasser 86'	Report	Léo Gamalho 64'	Stadium: Abdullah bin Khalifa Stadium; Referee: Hamad Al Subaie

27 December 2020 Round 11	Al-Ahli	3–5	Al-Duhail	Doha
15:00	Nasser Khalfan 2'; El Zhar 45+5' (pen.), 67'	Report	Dudu 5'; Ahmed Yasser 8'; Edmilson 12'; Almoez Ali 56'; Muntari 90'	Stadium: Hamad bin Khalifa Stadium; Referee: Saoud Al Athbah

3 January 2021 Round 12	Umm Salal	0–1	Al-Duhail	Doha
15:15		Report	Dudu 12'	Stadium: Suheim Bin Hamad Stadium; Referee: Moatasem Al Mazyed

8 January 2021 Round 13	Al-Duhail	8–1	Al-Wakrah	Doha
14:15	Dudu 3', 8', 72'; Edmilson 2', 10', 16', 19'; Almoez Ali 70' (pen.)	Report	Benyettou 45+1'	Stadium: Abdullah bin Khalifa Stadium; Referee: Salman Ahmad Flahi

12 January 2021 Round 14	Al Sadd SC	3–1	Al-Duhail	Doha
18:45	Bounedjah 14', 50', 87'	Report	Almoez Ali 6' (pen.)	Stadium: Jassim Bin Hamad Stadium; Referee: Abdulhadi Al Rowaily

19 January 2021 Round 15	Qatar SC	1–1	Al-Duhail	Doha
18:00	Berrahma 21' (pen.)	Report	Edmilson 51'	Stadium: Suheim Bin Hamad Stadium; Referee: Khamis Al Marri

14 February 2021 Round 16	Al-Duhail	2–0	Al-Rayyan	Doha
18:15	Ismaeel Mohammad 37'; Olunga 73'	Report		Stadium: Abdullah bin Khalifa Stadium; Referee: Abdulrahman Al Jassim

22 February 2021 Round 17	Al-Gharafa	1–2	Al-Duhail	Doha
15:45	Kodjia 24'	Report	Muntari 19'; Dudu 44'	Stadium: Suheim Bin Hamad Stadium; Referee: Abdulhadi Al Ruaile

6 March 2021 Round 18	Al Kharaitiyat	0–2	Al-Duhail	Doha
14:45		Report	Muntari 69'; Olunga 85'	Stadium: Abdullah bin Khalifa Stadium; Referee: Saoud Al Athbah

11 March 2021 Round 19	Al-Sailiya	2–0	Al-Duhail	Doha
16:00	Olunga 20' (pen.); Edmilson 51'	Report		Stadium: Hamad bin Khalifa Stadium; Referee: Moatasem Al Mazyed

3 April 2021 Round 20	Al-Arabi	2–3	Al-Duhail	Doha
20:30	Al-Ansari 29'; Msakni 40'	Report	Mohammed Musa 35'; Olunga 44' (pen.); Edmilson 54'	Stadium: Jassim Bin Hamad Stadium; Referee: Meshari Al shammari

6 April 2021 Round 21	Al-Khor	1–1	Al-Duhail	Doha
20:30	Fetfatzidis 65'	Report	Dudu 49'	Stadium: Hamad bin Khalifa Stadium; Referee: Salman Ahmad Flahi

9 April 2021 Round 22	Al-Duhail	4–0	Al-Ahli	Doha
18:15	Dudu 34', 89'; Olunga 54', 83'	Report		Stadium: Hamad bin Khalifa Stadium; Referee: Abdulrahman Al Jassim

== 2020 Emir of Qatar Cup ==
31 October 2020 Semi-finals	Al-Duhail	1–4	Al Sadd SC	Doha
18:00	Edmilson 10'	Report	Khoukhi 59'; Guilherme Torres 64'; Bounedjah 77'; Tabata 88'	Stadium: Abdullah bin Khalifa Stadium; Referee: Abdulrahman Al-Jassim

== 2021 Emir of Qatar Cup ==
25 January 2021 Round of 16	Al-Duhail	6–0	Al-Ahli	Doha
18:15	Olunga 6' (pen.), 43', 69'; Edmilson 22', 90'; Luiz Júnior 78'	Report		Stadium: Grand Hamad Stadium; Referee: Saoud Al Athbah

2 March 2021 Quarter-finals	Al-Duhail	2–0	Al-Shamal	Doha
15:50	Olunga 45+3'; Al-Ahrak 84'	Report		Stadium: Suheim Bin Hamad Stadium; Referee: Mohammed Al-Shammari

10 May 2021 Semi-finals	Al-Duhail	1–2	Al-Rayyan	Doha
22:00	Olunga 81'	Report	Traoré 13'; Brahimi 59' (pen.)	Stadium: Jassim Bin Hamad Stadium; Referee: Khamis Al-Marri

== Qatar Cup (ex) Crown Prince Cup ==
18 February 2021 Semi-finals	Al-Duhail	2–1	Al-Gharafa	Doha
19:45	Karami 36'; Al-Brake 72'	Report	Alawi 19'	Stadium: Abdullah bin Khalifa Stadium; Referee: Salman Ahmad Flahi

26 February 2021 Final	Al-Duhail	0–2	Al Sadd SC	Doha
16:45		Report	Bounedjah 9', 77'	Stadium: Abdullah bin Khalifa Stadium; Referee: Khamis Al-Marri

== FIFA Club World Cup ==
1 February 2021 First round	Al-Duhail (Qatar)	3–0; Awarded (Note: The Al-Duhail v Auckland City match was awarded as a 3–0 win to Al-Duhail after Auckland City withdrew due to the COVID-19 pandemic and related quarantine measures required by the New Zealand authorities.)	(New Zealand) Auckland City	Al Rayyan
20:30		Report		Stadium: Ahmed bin Ali Stadium

4 February 2021 Second round	Al-Duhail (Qatar)	0–1	(Egypt) Al Ahly	Al Rayyan
20:30		Report	El Shahat 30'	Stadium: Education City Stadium; Referee: Mario Escobar (Guatemala)

7 February 2021 Fifth place	Ulsan Hyundai (South Korea)	1–3	(Qatar) Al-Duhail	Al Rayyan
18:00	Yoon Bit-garam 62'	Report	Edmilson 21'; Muntari 66'; Ali 82'	Stadium: Ahmed bin Ali Stadium; Attendance: 920; Referee: Edina Alves Batista (Brazil)

== 2020 AFC Champions League ==
=== Group stage ===
==== Group C ====
Pos	Team	Pld	W	D	L	GF	GA	GD	Pts	Qualification	PRS	TAW	DUH	SHJ
1	(Iran) Persepolis	6	3	1	2	8	5	+3	10	Advance to knockout stage	—	1–0	0–1	4–0
2	(Saudi Arabia) Al-Taawoun	6	3	0	3	4	8	−4	9 (Note: Head-to-head points: Al-Taawoun 6, Al-Duhail 0.)	Advance to knockout stage	0–1	—	2–0	0–6
3	(Qatar) Al-Duhail	6	3	0	3	7	8	−1	9		2–0	0–1	—	2–1
4	(United Arab Emirates) Sharjah	6	2	1	3	13	11	+2	7		2–2	0–1	4–2	—

Source: AFC
Notes:

15 September 2020 (Note: Due to the COVID-19 pandemic in Asia, the following matches were postponed to a later date between late February and early March: Group A: Al-Ahli v Al-Shorta and Al-Wahda v Esteghlal (2 March 2020); Group B: Al-Hilal v Pakhtakor and Shabab Al-Ahli v Shahr Khodro (3 March 2020); Group C: Persepolis v Al-Taawoun and Al-Duhail v Sharjah (2 March 2020); Group D: Al-Ain v Al-Sadd and Sepahan v Al-Nassr (3 March 2020), Al-Nassr v Sepahan (6 April 2020); Group E: FC Seoul v Chiangrai United (3 March 2020); Group F: Perth Glory v Ulsan Hyundai (18 March 2020)) (Note: On 9 July 2020, AFC announced new schedule for 2020 AFC Champions League group stage. On 16 July 2020, AFC announced that Qatar would host 2020 AFC Champions League in the West region from the group stage to the semi-finals. On 27 July 2020, AFC confirmed that Malaysia would host matches of Group G and H.) 3	Al-Duhail (Qatar)	2–1	(United Arab Emirates) Sharjah	Doha
18:00 UTC+3	Ali 41'; Rezaeian 51'	Live Report; Stats Report	Coronado 58' (pen.)	Stadium: Education City Stadium; Attendance: 0 Referee: Muhammad Taqi (Singapore)

18 September 2020 4	Sharjah (United Arab Emirates)	4–2	(Qatar) Al-Duhail	Doha
18:00 UTC+3	Ba Wazir 18'; Suroor 62'; Coronado 75' (pen.); Caio 90+1'	Live Report; Stats Report	Al-Ahrak 12'; Ali 70'	Stadium: Education City Stadium; Attendance: 0 Referee: Omar Al-Yaqoubi (Oman)

21 September 2020 5	Persepolis (Iran)	0–1	(Qatar) Al-Duhail	Doha
18:00 UTC+3		Live Report; Stats Report	Ali 60' (pen.)	Stadium: Education City Stadium; Attendance: 0 Referee: Hettikamkanamge Perera (Sri Lanka)

24 September 2020 6	Al-Duhail (Qatar)	0–1	(Saudi Arabia) Al-Taawoun	Doha
21:00 UTC+3		Live Report; Stats Report	Duke 86'	Stadium: Education City Stadium; Attendance: 10; Referee: Mohd Amirul Izwan Yaacob (Malaysia)

== 2021 AFC Champions League ==
=== Group stage ===
On 11 March 2021, AFC confirmed Thailand as the hosts for the group stage, except for Group H and I.

==== Group C ====
Pos	Team	Pld	W	D	L	GF	GA	GD	Pts	Qualification	EST	DUH	AHL	SHO
1	(Iran) Esteghlal	6	3	2	1	14	8	+6	11	Advance to Round of 16	—	2–2	5–2	1–0
2	(Qatar) Al-Duhail	6	2	3	1	11	9	+2	9		4–3	—	1–1	2–0
3	(Saudi Arabia) Al-Ahli (H)	6	2	3	1	9	8	+1	9		0–0	1–1	—	2–1
4	(Iraq) Al-Shorta	6	1	0	5	3	12	−9	3		0–3	2–1	0–3	—

Source: AFC
(H) Hosts

15 April 2021 1	Al-Duhail (Qatar)	2–0	(Iraq) Al-Shorta	Jeddah
20:45 UTC+3	Olunga 36'; Edmilson 53'	Live Report; Stats Report		Stadium: Sports Hall; Attendance: 0 Referee: Muhammad Taqi (Singapore)

18 April 2021 2	Al-Ahli (Saudi Arabia)	1–1	(Qatar) Al-Duhail	Jeddah
20:45 UTC+3	Al Somah 90+1'	Live Report; Stats Report	Olunga 53'	Stadium: Sports Hall; Attendance: 0 Referee: Sivakorn Pu-udom (Thailand)

21 April 2021 3	Al-Duhail (Qatar)	4–3	(Iran) Esteghlal	Jeddah
20:45 UTC+3	Olunga 10', 27', 85'; Al-Ahrak 43'	Live Report; Stats Report	Motahari 4'; Diabaté 34'; Esmaeili 74'	Stadium: Sports Hall; Attendance: 50; Referee: Ahmed Al-Ali (Jordan)

24 April 2021 4	Esteghlal (Iran)	2–2	(Qatar) Al-Duhail	Jeddah
23:15 UTC+3	Diabaté 27' (pen.); Ghayedi 61'	Live Report; Stats Report	Olunga 45+3' (pen.), 59'	Stadium: Sports Hall; Attendance: 50; Referee: Muhammad Taqi (Singapore)

27 April 2021 5	Al-Shorta (Iraq)	2–1	(Qatar) Al-Duhail	Jeddah
20:45 UTC+3	Attwan 3'; Dawood 85'	Live Report; Stats Report	Olunga 57'	Stadium: Sports Hall; Attendance: 50; Referee: Omar Al-Yaqoubi (Oman)

30 April 2021 6	Al-Duhail (Qatar)	1–1	(Saudi Arabia) Al-Ahli	Jeddah
23:15 UTC+3	Olunga 61'	Live Report; Stats Report	Asiri 73'	Stadium: Sports Hall; Attendance: 50; Referee: Hettikamkanamge Perera (Sri Lanka)

== Squad information ==
=== Playing statistics ===
As of 7 May 2021

No.	Pos	Nat	Player	Total		Qatar Stars League		Emir of Qatar Cup		2020 AFC CL1		2021 AFC CL1		Other (Note: Includes the Qatar Cup, Sheikh Jassim Cup and FIFA Club World Cup)	
No.	Pos	Nat	Player	Apps	Goals	Apps	Goals	Apps	Goals	Apps	Goals	Apps	Goals	Apps	Goals
Goalkeepers
1	GK	(Qatar) QAT	Mohammed Al-Bakri	10	0	10	0	0	0	0	0	0	0	0	0
21	GK	(Qatar) QAT	Salah Zakaria	23	0	10	0	3	0	0	0	6	0	4	0
16	GK	(Qatar) QAT	Khalifa Ababacar	4	0	3	0	1	0	0	0	0	0	0	0
Defenders
2	DF	(Qatar) QAT	Mohammed Musa	26	1	15	1	3	0	0	0	5	0	3	0
3	DF	(Qatar) QAT	Ali Malolah	11	0	6	0	2	0	0	0	0	0	3	0
4	DF	(Morocco) MAR	Medhi Benatia	24	0	13	0	3	0	0	0	5	0	3	0
5	DF	(Qatar) QAT	Bassam Al-Rawi	21	0	10	0	3	0	0	0	5	0	3	0
6	DF	(Qatar) QAT	Ahmed Yasser	21	2	15	2	2	0	0	0	2	0	2	0
18	DF	(Qatar) QAT	Sultan Al-Brake	31	1	20	0	2	0	0	0	6	0	3	1
Midfielders
8	MF	(Qatar) QAT	Luiz Júnior	18	1	14	0	1	1	0	0	2	0	1	0
10	MF	(Belgium) BEL	Edmilson	30	17	16	12	4	3	0	0	6	1	4	1
12	MF	(Qatar) QAT	Karim Boudiaf	26	0	16	0	2	0	0	0	6	0	2	0
14	MF	(Qatar) QAT	Abdullah Al-Ahrak	31	3	20	1	3	1	0	0	5	1	3	0
22	MF	(Qatar) QAT	Khaled Mohammed	25	1	17	1	3	0	0	0	3	0	2	0
23	MF	(Qatar) QAT	Assim Madibo	8	0	4	0	2	0	0	0	0	0	2	0
24	MF	(Iran) IRI	Ali Karimi	22	1	9	0	3	0	0	0	6	0	4	1
77	MF	(Brazil) BRA	Dudu	30	14	22	14	4	0	0	0	0	0	4	0
Forwards
7	MF	(Qatar) QAT	Ismaeel Mohammad	32	1	20	1	2	0	0	0	6	0	4	0
19	FW	(Qatar) QAT	Almoez Ali	33	7	20	6	3	0	0	0	6	0	4	1
20	MF	(Qatar) QAT	Ali Afif	14	1	9	1	2	0	0	0	2	0	1	0
26	FW	(Kenya) KEN	Michael Olunga	22	20	9	6	3	5	0	0	6	9	4	0
29	FW	(Qatar) QAT	Mohammed Muntari	32	6	20	5	3	0	0	0	6	0	3	1
13	FW	(Qatar) QAT	Mubarak Shanan Hamza	1	0	1	0	0	0	0	0	0	0	0	0
Players transferred out during the season
	DF	(Iran) IRI	Ramin Rezaeian	11	2	10	2	1	0	0	0	0	0	0	0

Last updated: 26 January 2021
Source: fr.soccerway.com

=== Goalscorers ===
Includes all competitive matches. The list is sorted alphabetically by surname when total goals are equal.

No.	Nat.	Player	Pos.	QSL	QEC	CPC	CL 1	SJC	CWC	TOTAL
26	(Kenya)	Michael Olunga	FW	6	5	0	9	0	0	20
10	(Belgium)	Edmilson	MF	12	3	0	1	0	1	17
77	(Brazil)	Dudu	MF	14	0	0	0	0	0	14
19	(Qatar)	Almoez Ali	FW	6	0	0	3	0	1	10
29	(Qatar)	Mohammed Muntari	FW	5	0	0	0	0	1	6
14	(Qatar)	Abdullah Al-Ahrak	MF	1	1	0	2	0	0	4
	(Iran)	Ramin Rezaeian	DF	2	0	0	1	0	0	3
6	(Qatar)	Ahmed Yasser	DF	2	0	0	0	0	0	2
20	(Qatar)	Ali Afif	MF	1	0	0	0	0	0	1
7	(Qatar)	Ismaeel Mohammad	MF	1	0	0	0	0	0	1
	(Qatar)	Khaled Mohammed	FW	1	0	0	0	0	0	1
2	(Qatar)	Mohammed Musa	DF	1	0	0	0	0	0	1
8	(Belgium)	Luiz Júnior	MF	0	1	0	0	0	0	1
24	(Iran)	Ali Karimi	MF	0	0	1	0	0	0	1
18	(Qatar)	Sultan Al-Brake	DF	0	0	1	0	0	0	1
Own Goals				0	0	0	0	0	0	0
Totals				53	10	2	16	0	3	84

== Transfers ==
=== In ===
Date	Pos	Player	From club	Transfer fee	Source
20 July 2020	MF	(Brazil) Dudu	(Brazil) Palmeiras	Loan for one year	
22 August 2020	DF	(Iran) Ramin Rezaeian	Al Shahania	Free transfer	
5 January 2021	MF	(Iran) Ali Karimi	Qatar SC	Loan for six months	

=== Out ===
Date	Pos	Player	To club	Transfer fee	Source
1 January 2021	DF	(Iran) Ramin Rezaeian	Al-Sailiya	Loan for six months	
