= 2019–20 Al-Duhail SC season =

Al-Duhail
2019–20 season
- Chairman: Khalifa bin Hamad bin Khalifa Al Thani
- Head coach: Rui Faria (until 20 January 2020); Walid Regragui (from 23 January 2020)
- Stadium: Abdullah bin Khalifa Stadium
- Qatar Stars League: 1st
- Emir of Qatar Cup: Quarter-finals
- Sheikh Jassim Cup: Runners–up
- Crown Prince Cup: Runners–up
- Champions League: 2019: Round of 16; 2020: Group stage
- Top goalscorer: League: Mohammed Muntari (8 goals); All: Almoez Ali (10 goals)

In the 2019–20 season, Al-Duhail is competing in the Qatar Stars League for the 9th season, as well as the Emir of Qatar Cup and the Champions League.

== Squad list ==
Players and squad numbers last updated on 20 September 2019.
Note: Flags indicate national team as has been defined under FIFA eligibility rules. Players may hold more than one non-FIFA nationality.

No.	Nat.	Position	Name	Date of birth (age)	Signed from
Goalkeepers
	(Qatar)	GK	Mohammed Al-Bakri	28 March 1997 (aged 22)	(Qatar) Youth system
	(Qatar)	GK	Khalifa Ababacar	7 July 1989 (aged 30)	(Qatar) Al Kharaitiyat
Defenders
	(Qatar)	CB	Mohammed Musa	23 March 1986 (aged 33)	(Qatar) Umm Salal
	(Qatar)	CB / RB	Bassam Al-Rawi	16 December 1997 (aged 21)	(Qatar) Al-Rayyan
	(Qatar)	CB	Ahmed Yasser	17 May 1994 (aged 25)	(Qatar) Aspire Academy
	(Qatar)	LB	Sultan Al-Brake	7 April 1996 (aged 23)	(Qatar) Aspire Academy
	(Morocco)	CB	Medhi Benatia	17 April 1987 (aged 32)	(Italy) Juventus
Midfielders
	(Qatar)	DM	Luiz Júnior	13 January 1989 (aged 30)	(Brazil) Uniclinic
	(Belgium)	LW	Edmilson	19 August 1994 (aged 25)	(Belgium) Standard Liège
	(Qatar)	DM	Karim Boudiaf	16 September 1990 (aged 29)	(France) Nancy
	(Qatar)	AM	Abdullah Al-Ahrak	10 May 1997 (aged 22)	(Spain) Cultural Leonesa
	(Qatar)	DM	Assim Madibo	22 October 1996 (aged 22)	(Spain) Cultural Leonesa
	(Qatar)	CM	Khalid Mohammed	7 June 2000 (aged 19)	(England) Leeds United
Forwards
	(Qatar)	RW	Ismaeel Mohammad	5 April 1990 (aged 29)	(Qatar) El Jaish
	(Qatar)	ST	Almoez Ali	19 August 1996 (aged 23)	(Spain) Cultural Leonesa
	(Qatar)	LW	Ali Afif	20 January 1988 (aged 31)	(Qatar) Al Sadd SC
	(Qatar)	ST	Mohammed Muntari	20 December 1993 (aged 25)	(Qatar) El Jaish

== Competitions ==
=== Overview ===
Competition	Record								Started round	Final position / round	First match	Last match
Competition	G	W	D	L	GF	GA	GD	Win %	Started round	Final position / round	First match	Last match
Qatar Stars League	22	16	4	2	38	16	+22	72.73	Matchday 1	Winner	21 August 2019	20 August 2020 (Note: The league was halted on 16 March 2020 due to COVID-19 pandemic in Qatar, then later resumed on 24 July 2020.)
Emir of Qatar Cup	2	2	0	0	8	0	+8	100.00	Round of 16	Quarter-finals	6 February 2020	14 March 2020
Qatar Crown Prince Cup	2	1	0	1	2	4	−2	50.00	Semi-finals	Runners–up	10 January 2020	17 January 2020
Sheikh Jassim Cup	1	1	0	0	1	0	+1	100.00	Final	Runners–up	17 August 2019	
Champions League	2	0	1	1	2	4	−2	0.00	Round of 16		6 August 2019	13 August 2019
Champions League	2	1	0	1	2	2	+0	50.00	Group stage		11 February 2020	18 February 2020
Total	31	21	5	5	53	26	+27	67.74				

Updated to match played 20 August 2020
Source: Competitions

=== Qatar Stars League ===
==== League table ====
Pos	Team	Pld	W	D	L	GF	GA	GD	Pts	Qualification or relegation
1	Al Duhail (C)	22	16	4	2	38	16	+22	52	Qualification for AFC Champions League group stage and FIFA Club World Cup first round
2	Al-Rayyan	22	15	6	1	40	15	+25	51	Qualification for AFC Champions League group stage
3	Al Sadd (Note: Al Sadd qualified for the AFC Champions League group stage as Emir of Qatar Cup winners.)	22	14	3	5	51	29	+22	45	Qualification for AFC Champions League group stage
4	Al-Gharafa	22	10	6	6	34	29	+5	36	Qualification for AFC Champions League play-off round
5	Al-Sailiya	22	8	5	9	22	25	−3	29	

Source: QSL
Rules for classification: 1) Points; 2) Goal difference; 3) Number of goals scored;
(C) Champions

==== Results summary ====
Overall								Home						Away					
Pld	W	D	L	GF	GA	GD	Pts	W	D	L	GF	GA	GD	W	D	L	GF	GA	GD
22	16	4	2	38	16	+22	52	7	4	0	17	7	+10	9	0	2	21	9	+12

Last updated: 20 August 2020.
Source: Competitive matches

==== Results by round ====
Round	1	2	3	4	5	6	7	8	9	10	11	12	13	14	15	16	17	18	19	20	21	22
Ground	A	H	H	A	A	H	A	H	H	A	A	H	A	A	H	H	A	H	A	A	H	H
Result	W	D	D	W	W	W	W	W	W	W	W	D	W	L	W	W	W	D	W	L	W	W
Position																						1

Updated to match(es) played on 21 August 2020. Source: Competitive matches
A = Away; H = Home; W = Win; D = Draw; L = Loss

==== Matches ====
21 August 2019 Round 1	Qatar SC	1–2	Al-Duhail	Al Wakrah
20:30	Kabananga 60'	Report	Msakni 88'; Almoez Ali 90+2'	Stadium: Al Janoub Stadium; Referee: Hamad Al Subaie

29 August 2019 Round 2	Al-Duhail	1–1	Al-Arabi	Al Wakrah
20:20	Msakni 7'	Report	Gunnarsson 40'	Stadium: Al Janoub Stadium; Referee: Mohammed Al Shummari

15 September 2019 Round 3	Al-Duhail	1–1	Al-Rayyan	Al Wakrah
20:05	Yasser 66'	Report	Kom 76'	Stadium: Al Janoub Stadium; Referee: Salman Ahmad Flahi

21 September 2019 Round 4	Al-Wakrah	2–4	Al-Duhail	Doha
20:00	Benyettou 3'; Mardanli 49'	Report	Ali Afif 23'; Muntari 36', 65'; Almoez Ali 90+1' (pen.)	Stadium: Jassim bin Hamad Stadium; Referee: Khamis Al Marri

28 September 2019 Round 5	Al-Shahania	0–1	Al-Duhail	Doha
18:50		Report	Boudiaf 22'	Stadium: Grand Hamad Stadium; Referee: Abdulrahman Al Marri

3 October 2019 Round 6	Al-Duhail	2–1	Al-Sailiya	Doha
18:40	Khalid Mohammed 24'; Mohanad Ali 90'	Report	Abdulrahman 31'	Stadium: Abdullah bin Khalifa Stadium; Referee: Abdullah Al Athbah

20 October 2019 Round 7	Umm Salal	0–1	Al-Duhail	Doha
18:25		Report	Muntari 65'	Stadium: Thani bin Jassim Stadium; Referee: Meshari Al Shammari

26 October 2019 Round 8	Al-Duhail	2–1	Al-Gharafa	Doha
20:30	Muntari 66'; Edmilson 87'	Report	Hanni 60'	Stadium: Abdullah bin Khalifa Stadium; Referee: Hamad Al Subaie

2 November 2019 Round 9	Al-Duhail	4–1	Al Sadd SC	Doha
19:25	Muntari 34'; Boudiaf 45+1'; Edmilson 81'; Almoez Ali 90+1'	Soccerway report	Al-Haidos 14'	Stadium: Abdullah bin Khalifa Stadium; Attendance: 4,878; Referee: Salman Ahmad Flahi

8 November 2019 Round 10	Al-Khor	2–3	Al-Duhail	Al Khor
19:20	Murisi 17'; Hammoudan 29'	Report	Muntari 43', 57' (pen.); Msakni 66'	Stadium: Al-Khor SC Stadium; Referee: Abdulhadi Al Ruaile

23 December 2019 Round 11	Al-Ahli	0–3	Al-Duhail	Doha
19:20		Report	Msakni 29'; Ismaeel Mohammad 45+3'; Almoez Ali 86' (pen.)	Stadium: Hamad bin Khalifa Stadium; Referee: Saoud Al Athbah

4 January 2020 Round 12	Al-Duhail	0–0	Qatar SC	Doha
18:20		Report		Stadium: Thani bin Jassim Stadium; Referee: Salman Ahmad Flahi

24 January 2020 Round 13	Al-Arabi	1–3	Al-Duhail	Doha
18:40	Harbaoui 19' (pen.)	Report	Almoez Ali 4', 90+5'; Edmilson 33'	Stadium: Grand Hamad Stadium; Referee: Meshari Al Shammari

1 February 2020 Round 14	Al-Rayyan	1–0	Al-Duhail	Doha
18:45	Boli 64'	Report		Stadium: Jassim Bin Hamad Stadium; Referee: Abdulrahman Al Jassim

22 February 2020 Round 15	Al-Duhail	1–0	Al-Wakrah	Doha
18:55	Kwang-song 48'	Report		Stadium: Abdullah bin Khalifa Stadium; Referee: Abdullah Al Athbah

27 February 2020 Round 16	Al-Duhail	3–1	Al-Shahania	Doha
16:50	Kwang-song 4'; Boudiaf 50'; Edmilson 81'	Report	Akaïchi 36'	Stadium: Abdullah bin Khalifa Stadium; Referee: Khamis Al Marri

7 March 2020 Round 17	Al-Sailiya	1–2	Al-Duhail	Doha
16:55	Boussoufa 90' (pen.)	Report	Kwang-song 12'; Boudiaf 85'	Stadium: Hamad bin Khalifa Stadium; Referee: Meshari Al Shammari

25 July 2020 Round 18	Al-Duhail	1–1	Umm Salal	Al Wakrah
17:45	Almoez Ali 49' (pen.)	Report	Azzi 51'	Stadium: Al Janoub Stadium; Attendance: 0 (close doors); Referee: Abdulhadi Al Ruaile
Note: due to coronavirus pandemic, Qatar Football Association decided to be all matches played behind closed doors.

2 August 2020 Round 19	Al-Gharafa	0–2	Al-Duhail	Doha
19:45		Report	Muntari 4'; Edmilson 80'	Stadium: Jassim Bin Hamad Stadium; Attendance: 0 (close doors); Referee: Salman Ahmad Flahi
Note: due to coronavirus pandemic, Qatar Football Association decided to be all matches played behind closed doors.

8 August 2020 Round 20	Al Sadd SC	1–0	Al-Duhail	Doha
18:45	Tabata 24'	Soccerway report		Stadium: Jassim bin Hamad Stadium; Attendance: 0 (close doors); Referee: Abdulrahman Al Jassim
Note: due to coronavirus pandemic, Qatar Football Association decided to be all matches played behind closed doors.

14 August 2020 Round 21	Al-Duhail	1–0	Al-Khor	Doha
20:30	Al-Ahrak 9'	Report		Stadium: Jassim bin Hamad Stadium; Attendance: 0 (close doors); Referee: Saoud Al Athbah
Note: due to coronavirus pandemic, Qatar Football Association decided to be all matches played behind closed doors.

21 August 2020 Round 22	Al-Duhail	1–0	Al-Ahli	Al Wakrah
20:30	Edmilson 24'	Report		Stadium: Al Janoub Stadium; Attendance: 0 (close doors); Referee: Khamis Mohamed Al Kuwari
Note: due to coronavirus pandemic, Qatar Football Association decided to be all matches played behind closed doors.

== Sheikh Jassim Cup ==
17 August 2019	Al Sadd SC	1–0	Al-Duhail	Doha
19:15	Assadalla 14'	Report		Stadium: Jassim bin Hamad Stadium; Referee: Saoud Al Athbah

== Emir of Qatar Cup ==
6 February 2020 Round of 16	Al-Duhail	4–0	Muaither	Doha
19:00	Kwang-song 42', 44'; Almoez Ali 45'; Muntari 69'	Report		Stadium: Abdullah bin Khalifa Stadium

14 March 2020 Quarter-finals	Al-Duhail	4–0	Al-Sailiya	Doha
18:30	Edmilson 24' (pen.); Al-Ahrak 49'; Almoez Ali 52'; Moustafa 65'	Report		Stadium: Jassim bin Hamad Stadium; Attendance: 0 (close doors)
Note: due to coronavirus outbreak, Qatar Football Association decided to be all matches played behind closed doors.

== Qatar Cup (ex) Crown Prince Cup ==
10 January 2020 Semi-finals	Al-Duhail	2–0	Al-Sailiya	Doha
21:30	Mandžukić 59'; Ali 72' (pen.)	Report		Stadium: Jassim Bin Hamad Stadium; Referee: Nayef Mohamed Al Kadiri

17 January 2020 Final	Al Sadd SC	4–0	Al-Duhail	Doha
17:30	Nam Tae-hee 5'; Bounedjah 21', 45'; Afif 72' (pen.)	Report		Stadium: Jassim bin Hamad Stadium; Attendance: 11,447; Referee: Saoud Al Athbah
Note: Lineup for Al-Duhail - , , , , , , , ( ’), , ( ’), ( ’)

== 2019 AFC Champions League ==
=== Knockout stage ===
==== Round of 16 ====
6 August 2019	Al-Duhail (Qatar)	1–1	(Qatar) Al Sadd SC	Al Wakrah
19:00 UTC+3	Msakni 44'	Live Report; Stats Report	Afif 30'	Stadium: Al Janoub Stadium; Attendance: 9,548; Referee: Ryuji Sato (Japan)

13 August 2019	Al Sadd SC (Qatar)	3–1	(Qatar) Al-Duhail	Doha
19:15 UTC+3	Afif 20'; Hassan 34'; Yasser 90+1' (o.g.)	Live Report; Stats Report	Edmilson 56'	Stadium: Jassim bin Hamad Stadium; Attendance: 9,930; Referee: Chris Beath (Australia)

== 2020 AFC Champions League ==
=== Group stage ===
==== Group C ====
Pos	Team	Pld	W	D	L	GF	GA	GD	Pts	Qualification	PRS	TAW	DUH	SHJ
1	(Iran) Persepolis	6	3	1	2	8	5	+3	10	Advance to knockout stage	—	1–0	0–1	4–0
2	(Saudi Arabia) Al-Taawoun	6	3	0	3	4	8	−4	9 (Note: Head-to-head points: Al-Taawoun 6, Al-Duhail 0.)	Advance to knockout stage	0–1	—	2–0	0–6
3	(Qatar) Al-Duhail	6	3	0	3	7	8	−1	9		2–0	0–1	—	2–1
4	(United Arab Emirates) Sharjah	6	2	1	3	13	11	+2	7		2–2	0–1	4–2	—

Source: AFC
Notes:

11 February 2020 1	Al-Duhail (Qatar)	2–0	(Iran) Persepolis	Doha
18:15 UTC+3	Mandžukić 5'; Edmilson 13'	Live Report; Stats Report		Stadium: Abdullah bin Khalifa Stadium; Attendance: 3,780; Referee: Aziz Asimov (Uzbekistan)

18 February 2020 2	Al-Taawoun (Saudi Arabia)	2–0	(Qatar) Al-Duhail	Buraidah
18:35 UTC+3	Al-Sahlawi 34'; Al-Swat 55'	Live Report; Stats Report		Stadium: King Abdullah Sport City Stadium; Attendance: 15,346; Referee: Adham Makhadmeh (Jordan)

== Squad information ==
=== Playing statistics ===
No.	Pos	Nat	Player	Total		Qatar Stars League		Emir of Qatar Cup		2019 AFC CL1		2020 AFC CL1		Other (Note: Includes the Qatar Cup, and Sheikh Jassim Cup)	
No.	Pos	Nat	Player	Apps	Goals	Apps	Goals	Apps	Goals	Apps	Goals	Apps	Goals	Apps	Goals
40	GK	(Qatar) QAT	Amine Lecomte	14	0	14	0	0	0	0	0	0	0	0	0
	GK	(Qatar) QAT	Khalifa Ababacar	0	0	0	0	0	0	0	0	0	0	0	0
1	GK	(Qatar) QAT	Mohamed Al-Bakri	8	0	8	0	0	0	0	0	0	0	0	0
44	GK	(Qatar) QAT	Ahmed Sofyan	0	0	0	0	0	0	0	0	0	0	0	0
2	DF	(Qatar) QAT	Mohammed Musa	17	0	17	0	0	0	0	0	0	0	0	0
4	DF	(Morocco) MAR	Medhi Benatia	18	0	18	0	0	0	0	0	0	0	0	0
5	DF	(Qatar) QAT	Bassam Al-Rawi	6	0	6	0	0	0	0	0	0	0	0	0
6	DF	(Qatar) QAT	Ahmad Yasser	13	1	13	1	0	0	0	0	0	0	0	0
15	DF	(Qatar) QAT	Mohamed Emad Aiash	0	0	0	0	0	0	0	0	0	0	0	0
18	DF	(Qatar) QAT	Sultan Al-Brake	10	0	10	0	0	0	0	0	0	0	0	0
26	DF	(Qatar) QAT	Noor Rahman	0	0	0	0	0	0	0	0	0	0	0	0
31	DF	(Qatar) QAT	Mohammed Khaled Dhaifallah	0	0	0	0	0	0	0	0	0	0	0	0
32	DF	(Qatar) QAT	Ahmed Fahad Al Soury	0	0	0	0	0	0	0	0	0	0	0	0
8	MF	(Qatar) QAT	Luiz Ceará	17	0	17	0	0	0	0	0	0	0	0	0
11	MF	(Qatar) QAT	Nasser Al-Yazidi	3	0	3	0	0	0	0	0	0	0	0	0
12	MF	(Qatar) QAT	Karim Boudiaf	22	4	22	4	0	0	0	0	0	0	0	0
22	MF	(Qatar) QAT	Khalid Mohammed	10	1	10	1	0	0	0	0	0	0	0	0
23	MF	(Qatar) QAT	Assim Madibo	10	0	10	0	0	0	0	0	0	0	0	0
25	MF	(Qatar) QAT	Saleh Halabi	0	0	0	0	0	0	0	0	0	0	0	0
27	MF	(Qatar) QAT	Abdullah Al-Ahrak	7	1	7	1	0	0	0	0	0	0	0	0
30	MF	(Qatar) QAT	Khaled Mansour	0	0	0	0	0	0	0	0	0	0	0	0
7	FW	(Qatar) QAT	Ismaeel Mohammad	15	1	15	1	0	0	0	0	0	0	0	0
9	FW	(North Korea) PRK	Han Kwang-song	10	3	10	3	0	0	0	0	0	0	0	0
10	FW	(Belgium) BEL	Edmilson	19	6	19	6	0	0	0	0	0	0	0	0
13	FW	(Qatar) QAT	Hazem Ahmed	0	0	0	0	0	0	0	0	0	0	0	0
16	FW	(Qatar) QAT	Rabh Boussafi	2	0	2	0	0	0	0	0	0	0	0	0
17	FW	(Croatia) CRO	Mario Mandzukic	5	0	5	0	0	0	0	0	0	0	0	0
19	FW	(Qatar) QAT	Almoez Ali	19	7	19	7	0	0	0	0	0	0	0	0
20	FW	(Qatar) QAT	Ali Afif	18	1	18	1	0	0	0	0	0	0	0	0
28	FW	(Tunisia) TUN	Youssef Msakni	13	4	13	4	0	0	0	0	0	0	0	0
29	FW	(Qatar) QAT	Mohammed Muntari	19	8	19	8	0	0	0	0	0	0	0	0
39	FW	(Qatar) QAT	Lotfi Madjer	0	0	0	0	0	0	0	0	0	0	0	0
	FW	(Qatar) QAT	Mohanad Ali	9	1	9	1	0	0	0	0	0	0	0	0
	FW	(Qatar) QAT	Abdelrahman Moustafa	7	0	7	0	0	0	0	0	0	0	0	0
Players transferred out during the season

Last updated: 6 March 2020
Source: fr.soccerway.com

=== Goalscorers ===
Includes all competitive matches. The list is sorted alphabetically by surname when total goals are equal.

No.	Nat.	Player	Pos.	QSL	QEC	CPC	CL 1	SJC	TOTAL
19	(Qatar)	Almoez Ali	FW	7	2	1	0	0	10
29	(Qatar)	Mohammed Muntari	FW	8	1	0	0	0	9
10	(Belgium)	Edmilson Junior	FW	6	1	0	2	0	9
28	(Tunisia)	Youssef Msakni	FW	4	0	0	1	0	5
9	(North Korea)	Han Kwang-song	FW	3	2	0	0	0	5
12	(Qatar)	Karim Boudiaf	MF	4	0	0	0	0	4
27	(Qatar)	Abdullah Al-Ahrak	MF	1	1	0	0	0	2
	(Croatia)	Mario Mandzukic	FW	0	0	1	1	0	2
22	(Qatar)	Khalid Mohammed	MF	1	0	0	0	0	1
7	(Qatar)	Ismaeel Mohammad	FW	1	0	0	0	0	1
20	(Qatar)	Ali Afif	FW	1	0	0	0	0	1
	(Qatar)	Mohanad Ali	FW	1	0	0	0	0	1
6	(Qatar)	Ahmad Yasser	DF	1	0	0	0	0	1
	(Qatar)	Abdelrahman Moustafa	MF	0	1	0	0	0	1
Own Goals				0	0	0	0	0	0
Totals				38	8	2	4	0	52

== Transfers ==
=== In ===
Date	Pos	Player	From club	Transfer fee	Source
29 December 2019	FW	(Croatia) Mario Mandžukić	(Italy) Juventus	Free transfer	
2 January 2020	FW	(North Korea) Han Kwang-song	(Italy) Juventus	7,000,000 €	
