= Al Duhail SC–Al Sadd SC rivalry =

Football rivalry in Qatar

- Other names: Al Duhail vs Al Sadd
- Location: Qatar (Doha), Asia
- Teams: Al Duhail; Al Sadd
- First meeting: Al Sadd 0–1 Lekhwiya; Qatar Stars League (2 November 2010)
- Latest meeting: Al Sadd 2–0 Al Duhail; Qatar Stars League (22 February 2025)
- Broadcasters: beIN Sports; Alkass Sports
- Stadiums: Abdullah bin Khalifa Stadium Al Duhail; Jassim Bin Hamad Stadium Al Sadd

Statistics
- Total meetings: 52 (30 league)
- Most wins: Al Duhail (24)
- Top scorer: Baghdad Bounedjah (23)
- All-time series: Al Duhail: 24; Drawn: 9 Al Sadd: 19
- Largest victory: Al Sadd 4–0 Al Duhail Qatar Cup (17 January 2020).; Al Duhail 5–1 Al Sadd Qatar Stars League (21 September 2024).

The fixture between Al Duhail and Al Sadd is a local derby in Doha, Qatar and a fierce rivalry. The derby does not have a common name. Since the establishment of Al Duhail, the matches between the two teams have become the most important in Qatar. The two teams have won the Qatar Stars League title 22 times, the Emir of Qatar Cup 21 times, the Qatar Cup (ex) Crown Prince Cup 11 times, and Sheikh Jassim Cup 17 times. On the continental level Al Sadd won the AFC Champions League twice and the Arab Champions League once.

== History ==
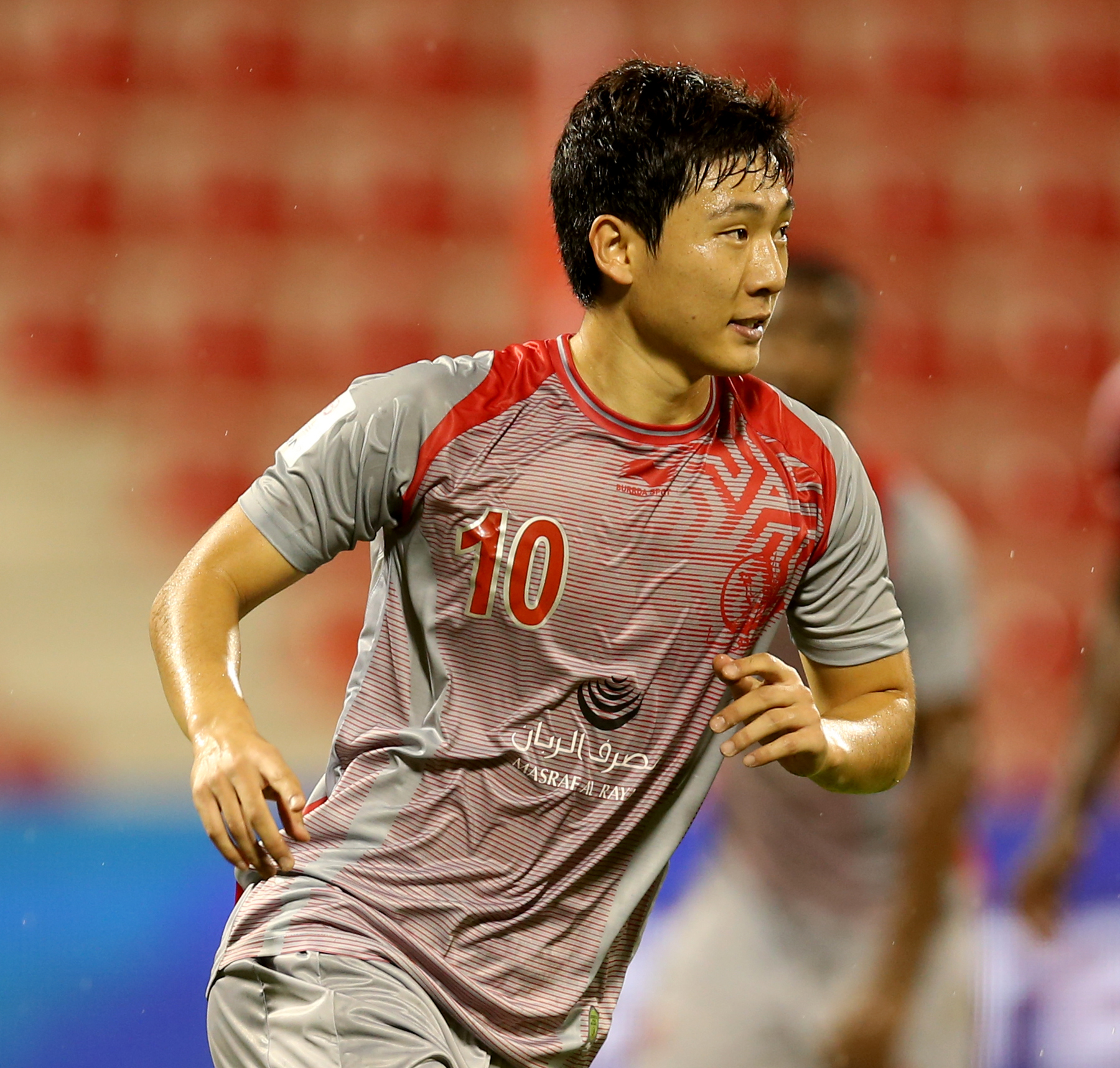
Nam Tae-hee, the first player to move directly between both clubs.

Al Duhail was founded in 2009 in the name of Lekhwiya who has the biggest financial budget in Qatar, and its beginning was in the Second Division, and it only lasted for one season. In his first season in the Qatar Stars League, Lekhwiya won the title to present himself as a new competitor to start a great competition with Al Sadd, which is the largest club in Qatar and the most titled. on the other side Al Sadd was shining in the AFC Champions League where it won the title for the second time in its history. and qualifies to participate in the 2011 FIFA Club World Cup as the first Qatari club and achieved third place. In the same season Lekhwiya won the league title for the second time in a row. To continue his dominance in the Qatar Stars League for two more times, in the middle of it a championship for Al Sadd in the 2012–13 season, surpassing him. In the same season they met for the first time in the Crown Prince Cup final, which ended with Lekhwiya winning the title for the first time. On 21 April 2012, Mamadou Niang scored the first hat-trick in the history of the confrontations between the two clubs in the semi-finals of the Crown Prince Cup. In the 2014–15 season, the two clubs dominated all the local championships, where Lekhwiya won the Qatar Stars League and Crown Prince Cup, while Al Sadd won Emir of Qatar Cup and the Sheikh Jassim Cup. In the Champions League the two clubs’ journey was wonderful, as the two teams clashed in the Round of 16. Where is this considered the first time that two Qatari clubs met in Champions League that ended with Lekhwiya 4–3 on aggregate to end his career in the quarter-final against Al-Hilal.

On 10 April 2017, it was decided to merge the two clubs, Lekhwiya the champion of Qatar Stars League and El Jaish SC into one entity under the name Al Duhail Sports Club starting from next season. On 8 February 2019, Korean Nam Tae-hee moved from Al Duhail to Al Sadd in the first direct transfer deal between the two clubs (no loans), though two years later he returned to his original team. After six years of waiting and almost complete control of Al Duhail, Al Sadd won the Qatar Stars League title for the 2018–19 season, while Al Duhail was satisfied with the runner-up and won the Emir of Qatar Cup. In the 2019 AFC Champions League, the two teams met in the Round of 16 and this time Al Sadd qualified with 4–2 on aggregate and was then eliminated in the semi-final against Al-Hilal. Under the leadership of Xavi, Al Sadd won the Qatar Stars League title for the 2020–21 season unbeaten for the 15th time in its history. On 11 December 2019, Khalifa bin Hamad bin Khalifa Al Thani son of the former Emir of Qatar, Hamad bin Khalifa Al Thani was elected president of Al Duhail during the club's General Assembly meeting.

== All-time head-to-head results ==
As of 22 February 2025

Tournament	Pld	DV	D	SV	GoalD	GoalS
Qatar Stars League	30	11	6	13	52	61
Emir of Qatar Cup	8	3	1	4	13	15
Qatar Cup (ex) Crown Prince Cup	6	3	0	3	9	13
Sheikh Jassim Cup	4	1	0	3	8	9
Champions League	4	1	2	1	6	7
TOTAL	52	19	9	24	88	105

Pld: Matches played
DV: Al Duhail Victory
D: Draw
SV: Al Sadd Victory
GoalD: Al Duhail Goals
GoalS: Al Sadd Goals

== All-time top scorers ==
Player	Club(s)	QSL	EQC	QC	SC	International	Total
(Algeria) Baghdad Bounedjah	Al Sadd	13	3	4	3	—	23
(South Korea) Nam Tae-hee	Al Duhail, Al Sadd	8	1	2	2	—	16
(Tunisia) Youssef Msakni	Al Duhail	4	1	1	1	3	10
(Qatar) Hassan Al-Haydos	Al Sadd	5	3	1	—	1	10
(Morocco) Youssef El-Arabi	Al Duhail	5	1	1	—	—	7
(Qatar) Ismaeel Mohammad	Al Duhail	2	—	2	1	1	7
(Qatar) Khalfan Ibrahim	Al Sadd	5	—	1	—	—	6
(Qatar) Akram Afif	Al Sadd	2	1	1	—	2	6
(Qatar) Almoez Ali	Al Duhail	4	1	—	—	1	6

=== Hat-tricks ===
A hat-trick is achieved when the same player scores three or more goals in one match. Listed in chronological order.

Sequence	Player	No. of goals	Time of goals	Representing	Final score	Opponent	Tournament
1.	(Senegal) Mamadou Niang	3	35' p., 38', 90+4'	Al Sadd	4–2	Lekhwiya	Crown Prince Cup
2.	(Algeria) Baghdad Bounedjah	3	5', 20', 66'	Al Sadd	4–2	Al Duhail	Sheikh Jassim Cup
3.	(Algeria) Baghdad Bounedjah	3	14', 50', 87'	Al Sadd	3–1	Al Duhail	Qatar Stars League

== Honours ==
Al Duhail	Championship	Al Sadd
International (Official)
–	AFC Champions League	2
0	Aggregate	2
Domestic (Official)
8	Qatar Stars League	18
4	Emir of Qatar Cup	19
4	Qatar Cup (ex) Crown Prince Cup	8
2	Sheikh Jassim Cup	15
18	Aggregate	60
International (Non-official)
–	Arab Champions League	1
–	GCC Champions League	1
0	Aggregate	2
18	Total Aggregate	64

== Competitions ==
=== League matches ===
No.	Date	Home team	Score	Away team	Goals (home)	Goals (away)
1	2 Nov 2010	Al Sadd	0 – 1	Lekhwiya	—	Razaq 77'
2	1 Apr 2011	Lekhwiya	1 – 2	Al Sadd	Traoré 88'	Y. Ahmed 80', Al. Afif 89'
3	20 Nov 2011	Lekhwiya	0 – 1	Al Sadd	—	Al-Hamad 39'
4	11 Mar 2012	Al Sadd	1 – 2	Lekhwiya	Ibrahim 78'	Dagano 56', Nam Tae-hee 82'
5	14 Dec 2012	Lekhwiya	0 – 3	Al Sadd	—	Raúl 4', Ibrahim Majid 15', Ibrahim 58' (pen.)
6	18 Apr 2013	Al Sadd	2 – 2	Lekhwiya	Al-Haydos 26', Assadalla 36'	Soria 48', Msakni 64'
7	12 Dec 2013	Al Sadd	2 – 3	Lekhwiya	Ibrahim 56', 60' (pen.)	Nam Tae-hee 8', 27', Soria 44' (pen.)
8	6 Apr 2014	Lekhwiya	0 – 2	Al Sadd	—	Hassan 65', Medany 87'
9	2 Oct 2014	Lekhwiya	0 – 3	Al Sadd	—	Belhadj 26', Tabata 50', Ibrahim 57'
10	28 Feb 2015	Al Sadd	0 – 1	Lekhwiya	—	Weiss 90+1' (pen.)
11	27 Nov 2015	Al Sadd	2 – 4	Lekhwiya	Belhadj 30', 58'	Muntari 41', Msakni 57', Chico 83', Nam Tae-hee 90' (pen.)
12	20 Mar 2016	Lekhwiya	2 – 3	Al Sadd	Boudiaf 16', Ismaeel 85'	Al-Haydos 5', 42' (pen.), Hassan 87'
13	16 Oct 2016	Lekhwiya	3 – 3	Al Sadd	El-Arabi 23', Msakni 40', Nam Tae-hee 77'	Bounedjah 19', 83', Al-Haidos 70' (pen.)
14	13 Jan 2017	Al Sadd	1 – 2	Lekhwiya	Assadalla 26'	Nam Tae-hee 16', Musa 89'
15	24 Nov 2017	Al Sadd	2 – 4	Al Duhail	Bounedjah 12', Ahmad 80'	Ali 6', El-Arabi 20', Al Rawi 72', Nam Tae-hee 89'
16	1 Mar 2018	Al Duhail	4 – 3	Al Sadd	Ismaeel 37', Msakni 40', 88', El-Arabi 90+4'	Hamroun 11', Bounedjah 71', 81'
17	11 Dec 2018	Al Sadd	3 – 1	Al Duhail	Mendes 9' (o.g.), Al-Hajri 89', Bounedjah 90+4'	El-Arabi 6' (pen.)
18	30 Mar 2019	Al Duhail	2 – 2	Al Sadd	El-Arabi 75', 85' (pen.)	Bounedjah 26', Naji 90+5' (o.g.)
19	2 Nov 2019	Al Duhail	4 – 1	Al Sadd	Muntari 34', Boudiaf 45+1', Edmilson 81', Ali 90+1'	Al-Haidos 14'
20	8 Aug 2020	Al Sadd	1 – 0	Al Duhail	Tabata 24'	—
21	21 Oct 2020	Al Duhail	1 – 3	Al Sadd	Dudu 86'	Nam Tae-hee 22', 70', Guilherme Torres 38'
22	12 Jan 2021	Al Sadd	3 – 1	Al Duhail	Bounedjah 14', 50', 87'	Ali 6' (pen.)
23	3 Nov 2021	Al Duhail	3 – 3	Al Sadd	Olunga 24', 89', Pedro Miguel 31' (o.g.)	Bounedjah 4', Khoukhi 73', Tabata 74'
24	25 Feb 2022	Al Sadd	1 – 1	Al Duhail	Ak. Afif 59'	Edmilson 36' (pen.)
25	12 Mar 2023	Al Sadd	2 – 2	Al Duhail	Bounedjah 34', Cazorla 57'	Nam Tae-hee 90', Fernández 90'
26	4 May 2023	Al Duhail	1 – 3	Al Sadd	Olunga 73'	Bounedjah 41', Ak. Afif 51' Tabata 75'
27	13 Dec 2023	Al Sadd	3 – 1	Al Duhail	Ak. Afif 57' (pen.), 90+13', Plata 59'	Boudiaf 10'
28	5 Apr 2024	Al Duhail	3 – 1	Al Sadd	Ali 40', Olunga 57', Al-Brake 62'	Ak. Afif 45+2'
29	21 Sep 2024	Al Duhail	5 – 1	Al Sadd	Olunga 13', Edmilson 28', 40', H. Ahmed 33', Ali 56'	Al-Haidos 45+2'
30	22 Feb 2025	Al Sadd	2 – 0	Al Duhail	Meshaal 70', Mújica 90+5'	—

=== Emir of Qatar Cup results ===
No.	Date	Round	Home team	Score	Away team	Goals (home)	Goals (away)
1	11 May 2013	Semi-finals	Al Sadd	3 – 2	Lekhwiya	Mahmoud 31', Kasola 59', Al-Haydos 89'	Msakni 26', Dia 66'
2	15 May 2015	Semi-finals	Al Sadd	2 – 0	Lekhwiya	Al-Haydos 62', 82'	—
3	20 May 2016	Final	Al Sadd	2 – 2 (pen. 2–4)	Al Duhail	Bounedjah 61', Hassan 67'	Chico 70', Nam Tae-hee 77'
4	11 May 2018	Semi-finals	Al Sadd	0 – 1	Al Duhail	—	Ali 68'
5	16 May 2019	Final	Al Sadd	1 – 4	Al Duhail	Ak. Afif 7'	Al. Afif 16', Edmilson 59', 81', El-Arabi 62'
6	31 Oct 2020	Semi-finals	Al Duhail	1 – 4	Al Sadd	Edmilson 10'	Khoukhi 59', Guilherme Torres 64', Bounedjah 77', Tabata 88'
7	14 Mar 2022	Semi-finals	Al Sadd	2 – 3	Al Duhail	Ayew 33', Bounedjah 90'	Sassi 7', 80', Olunga 44'
8	18 May 2024	Semi-finals	Al Duhail	0 – 1	Al Sadd	—	Ak. Afif 46'

=== Qatar Cup (ex) Crown Prince Cup results ===
No.	Date	Round	Home team	Score	Away team	Goals (home)	Goals (away)
1	21 Apr 2012	Semi-finals	Lekhwiya	2 – 4	Al Sadd	Nam Tae-Hee 52' (pen.), Bougherra 84'	Niang 35' (pen.), 38', 90+4', Ibrahim 74'
2	4 May 2013	Final	Lekhwiya	3 – 2	Al Sadd	Ismaeel 15', Lamy 30', Msakni 42'	Mahmoud 13' (pen.), Lee Jung-soo 90+1'
3	27 Apr 2018	Final	Al Sadd	1 – 2	Al Duhail	Al-Haidos 19'	Ismaeel 78', El-Arabi 90+10' (pen.)
4	17 Jan 2020	Final	Al Sadd	4 – 0	Al Duhail	Nam Tae-hee 5', Bounedjah 21', 45', Ak. Afif 72' (pen.)	—
5	26 Feb 2021	Final	Al Duhail	0 – 2	Al Sadd	—	Bounedjah 9', 77'
6	6 Apr 2023	Final	Al Duhail	2 – 0	Al Sadd	Olunga 48',Sassi 53'	—

=== Sheikh Jassim Cup results ===
No.	Date	Round	Home team	Score	Away team	Goals (home)	Goals (away)
1	13 Aug 2014	Final	Al Sadd	3 – 2	Lekhwiya	Weiss 12' (pen.), Msakni 71'	Tabata 10', Muriqui 80' (pen.), 86'
2	21 Jan 2016	Final	Lekhwiya	4 – 1	Al Sadd	Ismaeel 18', Razaq 46', Nam Tae-hee 60' (pen.), Weiss 87'	Al-Shammeri 50'
3	9 Sep 2017	Final	Al Duhail	2 – 4	Al Sadd	Nam Tae-hee 41', Ali 90+6'	Bounedjah 5', 20', 66', Hamroun 80' (pen.)
4	17 Aug 2019	Final	Al Sadd	1 – 0	Al Duhail	Assadalla 14'	—

=== International results ===
No.	Season	Round		Home team	Score	Away team	Goals (home)	Goals (away)
1	2015 Champions League	Round of 16	First leg	Al Sadd	1 – 2	Lekhwiya	Al-Haydos 37'	Soria 13', Msakni 36'
2	2015 Champions League	Round of 16	Second leg	Lekhwiya	2 – 2	Al Sadd	Msakni 13', Ismaeel 83'	Muriqui 36', Assadalla 63'
3	2019 Champions League	Round of 16	First leg	Al Duhail	1 – 1	Al Sadd	Msakni 44'	Ak. Afif 30'
4	2019 Champions League	Round of 16	2nd leg	Al Sadd	3 – 1	Al Duhail	Ak. Afif 20', Hassan 34', Yasser 90+1' (o.g.)	Edmilson 56'

== Shared player history ==
=== Players who have played for both clubs ===
- (Qatar) Ahmed Abdul Maqsoud (Al Sadd: 2010–2012, Al Duhail: 2012–2017)
- (Qatar) Ali Afif (Al Sadd: 2004–2012, Al Duhail: 2012–2023)
- (Brazil) Ivanildo (Al Duhail: 2015–2016, Al Sadd: 2022)
- (Qatar) Mohammed Musa (Al Sadd: 2010, Al Duhail: 2010–2024)
- (South Korea) Nam Tae-hee (Al Duhail: 2012–2019 & 2021–2023, Al Sadd: 2019–2021)
- (Qatar) Ali Nasser (Al Sadd: 2003–2013, Al Duhail: 2009–2010)

== Qatar Stars League results ==
The tables list the place each team took in each of the seasons.

	09–10	10–11	11–12	12–13	13–14	14–15	15–16	16–17	17–18	18–19	19–20	20–21	21–22	22–23	23–24	24–25
No. of teams	12	12	12	12	14	14	14	14	12	12	12	12	12	12	12	12
Al Duhail		1	1	2	1	1	4	1	1	2	1	2	2	1	6	2
Al Sadd	2	6	4	1	3	2	3	2	2	1	3	1	1	3	1	1
