= 2020 FIFA Club World Cup squads =

Each team in the 2020 FIFA Club World Cup had to name a 23-man squad (three of whom must be goalkeepers). FIFA announced the squads on 1 February 2021.

== Al Ahly ==
Manager: (South Africa) Pitso Mosimane

Note: Flags indicate national team as defined under FIFA eligibility rules; some limited exceptions apply. Players may hold more than one non-FIFA nationality.

No.	Pos.	Nation	Player
1	GK	(Egypt) EGY	Mohamed El Shenawy (captain)
3	DF	(Egypt) EGY	Ahmed Ramadan
6	DF	(Egypt) EGY	Yasser Ibrahim
7	FW	(Egypt) EGY	Kahraba
8	MF	(Egypt) EGY	Hamdy Fathy
9	FW	(Egypt) EGY	Marwan Mohsen
10	FW	(Egypt) EGY	Mohamed Sherif
12	DF	(Egypt) EGY	Ayman Ashraf
13	DF	(Morocco) MAR	Badr Benoun
14	MF	(Egypt) EGY	Hussein El Shahat
15	MF	(Mali) MLI	Aliou Dieng
16	GK	(Egypt) EGY	Ali Lotfi

No.	Pos.	Nation	Player
17	MF	(Egypt) EGY	Amr El Solia
18	FW	(Egypt) EGY	Salah Mohsen
19	MF	(Egypt) EGY	Mohamed Magdy
20	DF	(Egypt) EGY	Saad Samir
21	DF	(Tunisia) TUN	Ali Maâloul
25	MF	(Egypt) EGY	Akram Tawfik
26	FW	(Democratic Republic of the Congo) COD	Walter Bwalya
27	FW	(Egypt) EGY	Taher Mohamed
28	FW	(Nigeria) NGA	Junior Ajayi
30	DF	(Egypt) EGY	Mohamed Hany
31	GK	(Egypt) EGY	Mostafa Shobeir

== Al-Duhail ==
Manager: (France) Sabri Lamouchi

Note: Flags indicate national team as defined under FIFA eligibility rules; some limited exceptions apply. Players may hold more than one non-FIFA nationality.

No.	Pos.	Nation	Player
1	GK	(Qatar) QAT	Mohammed Al-Bakri
2	DF	(Qatar) QAT	Mohammed Musa
3	DF	(Qatar) QAT	Ali Malolah
4	DF	(Morocco) MAR	Medhi Benatia
5	DF	(Qatar) QAT	Bassam Al-Rawi
6	DF	(Qatar) QAT	Ahmed Yasser
7	MF	(Qatar) QAT	Ismaeel Mohammad
8	MF	(Qatar) QAT	Luiz Júnior (captain)
10	MF	(Belgium) BEL	Edmilson
12	MF	(Qatar) QAT	Karim Boudiaf
13	FW	(Qatar) QAT	Mubarak Shanan Hamza
14	MF	(Qatar) QAT	Abdullah Al-Ahrak

No.	Pos.	Nation	Player
16	GK	(Qatar) QAT	Khalifa Ababacar
18	DF	(Qatar) QAT	Sultan Al-Brake
19	FW	(Qatar) QAT	Almoez Ali
20	MF	(Qatar) QAT	Ali Afif
21	GK	(Qatar) QAT	Salah Zakaria
22	MF	(Qatar) QAT	Khaled Mohammed
23	MF	(Qatar) QAT	Assim Madibo
24	MF	(Iran) IRN	Ali Karimi
26	FW	(Kenya) KEN	Michael Olunga
29	FW	(Qatar) QAT	Mohammed Muntari
77	MF	(Brazil) BRA	Dudu

== Bayern Munich ==
Manager: (Germany) Hansi Flick

On 5 February 2021, Bayern Munich replaced the SARS-CoV-2 positive Javi Martínez with Tiago Dantas and the injured Alexander Nübel with Lukas Schneller.

Note: Flags indicate national team as defined under FIFA eligibility rules; some limited exceptions apply. Players may hold more than one non-FIFA nationality.

No.	Pos.	Nation	Player
1	GK	(Germany) GER	Manuel Neuer (captain)
4	DF	(Germany) GER	Niklas Süle
5	DF	(France) FRA	Benjamin Pavard
6	MF	(Germany) GER	Joshua Kimmich
7	FW	(Germany) GER	Serge Gnabry
9	FW	(Poland) POL	Robert Lewandowski
10	FW	(Germany) GER	Leroy Sané
11	FW	(Brazil) BRA	Douglas Costa
13	FW	(Cameroon) CMR	Eric Maxim Choupo-Moting
17	DF	(Germany) GER	Jérôme Boateng
18	MF	(Germany) GER	Leon Goretzka
19	FW	(Canada) CAN	Alphonso Davies

No.	Pos.	Nation	Player
20	DF	(France) FRA	Bouna Sarr
21	DF	(France) FRA	Lucas Hernandez
22	MF	(Spain) ESP	Marc Roca
24	MF	(France) FRA	Corentin Tolisso
25	FW	(Germany) GER	Thomas Müller
27	DF	(Austria) AUT	David Alaba
28	MF	(Portugal) POR	Tiago Dantas
29	MF	(France) FRA	Kingsley Coman
34	GK	(Germany) GER	Lukas Schneller
39	GK	(Germany) GER	Ron-Thorben Hoffmann
42	MF	(England) ENG	Jamal Musiala

== Palmeiras ==
Manager: (Portugal) Abel Ferreira

On 5 February 2021, Palmeiras replaced the injured Gabriel Veron with Lucas Esteves.

Note: Flags indicate national team as defined under FIFA eligibility rules; some limited exceptions apply. Players may hold more than one non-FIFA nationality.

No.	Pos.	Nation	Player
1	GK	(Brazil) BRA	Weverton
2	DF	(Brazil) BRA	Marcos Rocha
3	DF	(Brazil) BRA	Emerson Santos
4	DF	(Chile) CHI	Benjamín Kuscevic
5	MF	(Brazil) BRA	Patrick de Paula
6	DF	(Brazil) BRA	Alan Empereur
8	MF	(Brazil) BRA	Zé Rafael
10	FW	(Brazil) BRA	Luiz Adriano
11	FW	(Brazil) BRA	Rony
12	DF	(Brazil) BRA	Mayke
13	DF	(Brazil) BRA	Luan
14	MF	(Brazil) BRA	Gustavo Scarpa

No.	Pos.	Nation	Player
15	DF	(Paraguay) PAR	Gustavo Gómez
16	DF	(Brazil) BRA	Lucas Esteves
17	DF	(Uruguay) URU	Matías Viña
20	MF	(Brazil) BRA	Lucas Lima
22	GK	(Brazil) BRA	Jailson
23	MF	(Brazil) BRA	Raphael Veiga
24	GK	(Brazil) BRA	Vinicius Silvestre
25	MF	(Brazil) BRA	Gabriel Menino
28	MF	(Brazil) BRA	Danilo
29	FW	(Brazil) BRA	Willian
30	DF	(Brazil) BRA	Felipe Melo (captain)

== UANL ==
Manager: (Brazil) Ricardo Ferretti

Note: Flags indicate national team as defined under FIFA eligibility rules; some limited exceptions apply. Players may hold more than one non-FIFA nationality.

No.	Pos.	Nation	Player
1	GK	(Argentina) ARG	Nahuel Guzmán
3	DF	(Mexico) MEX	Carlos Salcedo
4	DF	(Mexico) MEX	Hugo Ayala
5	MF	(Brazil) BRA	Rafael Carioca
8	MF	(Ecuador) ECU	Jordan Sierra
10	FW	(France) FRA	André-Pierre Gignac
13	DF	(Mexico) MEX	Diego Reyes
14	DF	(Mexico) MEX	Juan Sánchez
17	MF	(Uruguay) URU	Leonardo Fernández
18	DF	(Mexico) MEX	Aldo Cruz
19	MF	(Argentina) ARG	Guido Pizarro (captain)
20	MF	(Mexico) MEX	Javier Aquino

No.	Pos.	Nation	Player
21	DF	(Colombia) COL	Francisco Meza
22	MF	(Mexico) MEX	Raymundo Fulgencio
23	MF	(Colombia) COL	Luis Quiñones
28	DF	(Mexico) MEX	Luis Rodríguez
29	MF	(Mexico) MEX	Jesús Dueñas
32	FW	(Paraguay) PAR	Carlos González
33	FW	(Colombia) COL	Julián Quiñones
35	GK	(Mexico) MEX	Juan Pablo Chávez
43	DF	(Mexico) MEX	Érick Ávalos
50	GK	(Mexico) MEX	Arturo Delgado
52	FW	(Mexico) MEX	Patrick Ogama

== Ulsan Hyundai ==
Manager: (South Korea) Hong Myung-bo

Note: Flags indicate national team as defined under FIFA eligibility rules; some limited exceptions apply. Players may hold more than one non-FIFA nationality.

No.	Pos.	Nation	Player
1	GK	(South Korea) KOR	Jo Su-huk
2	DF	(South Korea) KOR	Bae Jae-woo
3	DF	(Australia) AUS	Jason Davidson
4	DF	(Netherlands) NED	Dave Bulthuis
5	DF	(South Korea) KOR	Kim Tae-hyeon
6	MF	(South Korea) KOR	Shin Hyung-min
7	MF	(South Korea) KOR	Kim In-sung
9	FW	(South Korea) KOR	Kim Ji-hyeon
10	MF	(South Korea) KOR	Yoon Bit-garam
11	FW	(South Korea) KOR	Lee Dong-jun
13	MF	(South Korea) KOR	Kim Min-jun
16	MF	(South Korea) KOR	Won Du-jae

No.	Pos.	Nation	Player
17	MF	(South Korea) KOR	Kim Sung-joon
20	MF	(South Korea) KOR	Kang Dong-hyeok
21	GK	(South Korea) KOR	Jo Hyeon-woo
23	DF	(South Korea) KOR	Kim Tae-hwan
24	MF	(South Korea) KOR	Kang Yun-gu
25	GK	(South Korea) KOR	Seo Ju-hwan
28	MF	(South Korea) KOR	Lee Ho
29	FW	(South Korea) KOR	Lee Hyeong-kyeong
44	DF	(South Korea) KOR	Kim Kee-hee (captain)
66	DF	(South Korea) KOR	Seol Young-woo
91	FW	(Austria) AUT	Lukas Hinterseer
