= Kakou =

Kakou is both a given name and a surname. Notable people with the name include:

- Kakou Senda (1924–2000), Japanese writer
- Élie Kakou (1960–1999), Tunisian-French actor
- Emmanuel Kakou (bonr 2005), Ivorian footballer
- Herman Kakou (born 1991), Ivorian footballer
- Albert Kakou Tiapani (c. 1944–2021), Ivorian politician
