= Khalid Mohammed (disambiguation) =

Khalid Mohamed is an Indian journalist turned filmmaker.

Khalid Mohammed may also refer to:

- Khaled Hussein (Khaled Hussein Mohamed al Tarhouni), Libyan football midfielder.
- Khalid Abdul Muhammad (1948–2001), black nationalist and supremacist
- Khalid Sheikh Mohammed (1960s–2003), one of the alleged principal architect of the 9/11 attacks
- Khalid Mohammed (footballer) (born 1998), English footballer
- Khaled Mohammed (born 2000), Qatari footballer

== See also ==
- Muhammad Khalid (disambiguation)
