= Khaldoun Moussa =

Qatari footballer (born 1999)

Personal information
- Full name: Khaldoun Ismail Moussa
- Date of birth: 8 June 1999 (age 27)
- Position: Midfielder

Team information
- Current team: Muaither
- Number: 77

Youth career
- Al-Arabi

Senior career*
Years	Team	Apps	(Gls)
2018–2020	Al-Arabi	5	(0)
2020–2025	Al-Kharaitiyat		
2025–	Muaither		

International career^{‡}
2018–	Qatar U20	2	(0)
- * Club domestic league appearances and goals as of 19:24, 23 July 2018 (UTC) ‡ National team caps and goals as of 19:24, 23 July 2018 (UTC)

Khaldoun Ismail Moussa (Arabic: خلدون اسماعيل موسى; born 8 June 1999), is a Qatari footballer who plays as a midfielder.

== Career statistics ==
=== Club ===
As of 23 July 2018.

Club	Season	League			Cup		Continental		Other		Total	
Club	Season	Division	Apps	Goals	Apps	Goals	Apps	Goals	Apps	Goals	Apps	Goals
Al-Arabi	2017–18	Qatar Stars League	3	0	0	0	–		0	0	3	0
Career total			3	0	0	0	0	0	0	0	3	0
