= Muhammad Khalid (disambiguation) =

Muhammad Khalid may refer to:

- Muhammad Khalid, Pakistani field hockey player
- Muhammad Khalid (kabaddi), Pakistani kabaddi player
- Mohammed Khalid, Bahraini politician

== See also ==
- Khalid Mohammed (disambiguation)
