= Karim Boudiaf =

Qatari footballer (born 1990)

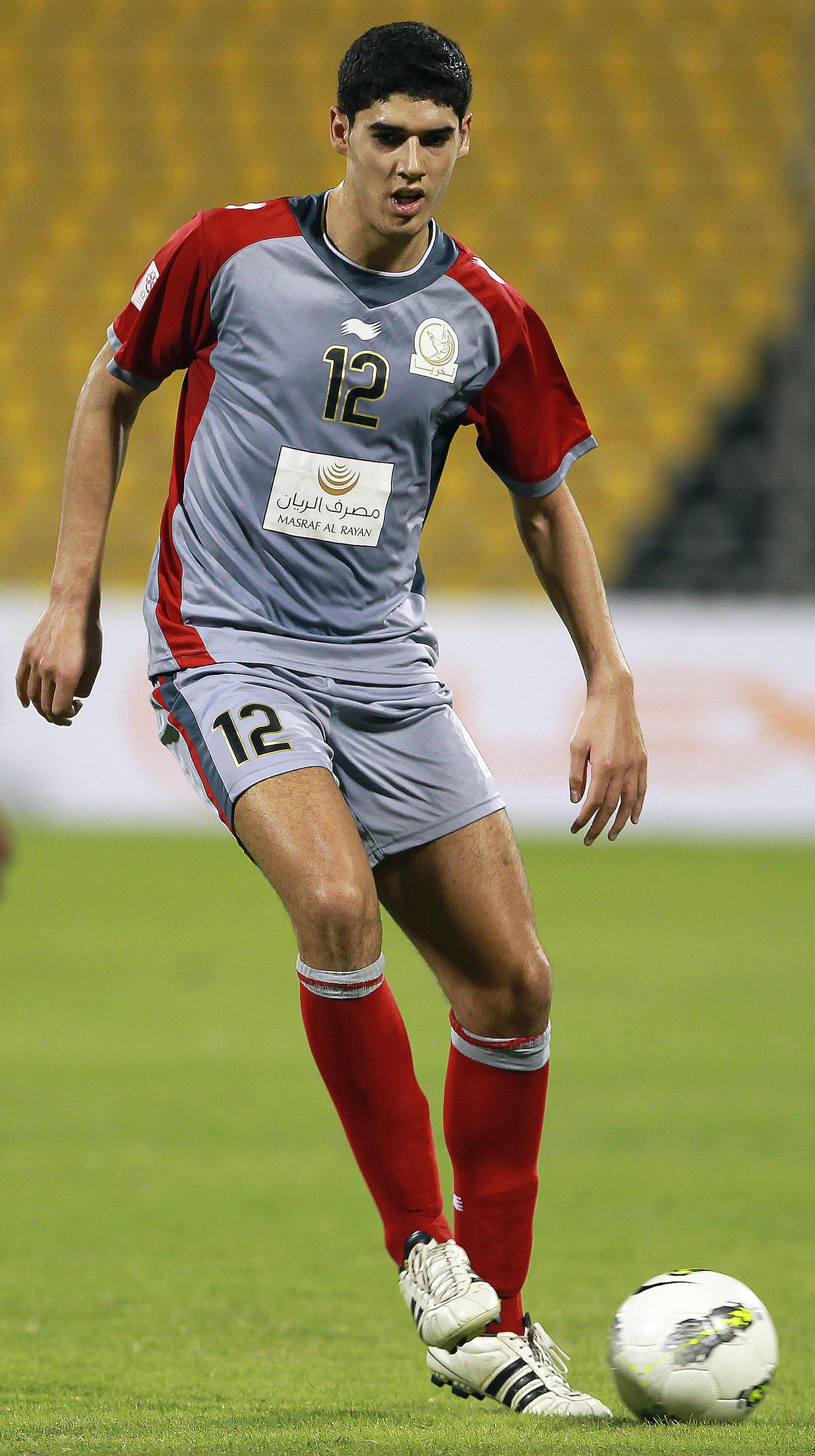
- Boudiaf with Lekhwiya in 2011

Personal information
- Full name: Karim Boudiaf
- Date of birth: 16 September 1990 (age 36)
- Place of birth: Rueil-Malmaison, France
- Height: 1.90 m (6 ft 3 in)
- Positions: Defender; midfielder

Team information
- Current team: Al-Duhail
- Number: 12

Youth career
- 2007–2008: Lorient
- 2008–2010: Nancy

Senior career*
| Years | Team | Apps | (Gls) |
| 2008–2010 | Nancy B | 18 | (0) |
| 2010– | Al-Duhail | 262 | (17) |

International career^{‡}
| 2013– | Qatar | 121 | (6) |
Medal record
Representing Qatar
Men's Football
AFC Asian Cup
| Winner | 2019 UAE | Team |
FIFA Arab Cup
| Third place | 2021 |
- * Club domestic league appearances and goals as of 00:00, 24 December 2024 (UTC) ‡ National team caps and goals as of 8 February 2024 (UTC)

Karim Boudiaf (Arabic: كريم بوضياف; born 16 September 1990) is a professional footballer who plays for Al-Duhail in the Qatar Stars League. He can play as a central defender and as a defensive midfielder. Born in France, he represents the Qatar national team.

== Club career ==
On 5 September 2010, Boudiaf started for Lekhwiya in the final of the 2010 Sheikh Jassem Cup against Al-Arabi Sports Club.

== International career ==
Boudiaf was born in France, and is of Moroccan-Algerian descent. On 22 December 2009, Boudiaf was called up to the Algeria U23 national team for a training camp in Algiers.

Boudiaf acquired Qatari nationality and was called up to the Qatar national team on 13 November 2013. He was capped in an unofficial friendly exhibition match against Saudi club Al Hilal. He made his official debut for the team on 25 December in the 2014 WAFF Championship in a 1–0 win against Palestine. Boudiaf's first goal came fifteen caps in. He cancelled out a Stuart Dallas goal as Qatar drew with Northern Ireland in England.

== Career statistics ==
=== Club ===
As of 24 December 2024

Appearances and goals by club, season and competition
| Club | Season | League | | | Cup (Note: Includes Qatar Emir Cup) | | Continental (Note: Includes AFC Champions League) | | Other (Note: Includes Qatar Crown Prince Cup and Qatari Super Cup) | | Total | |
| Club | Season | Division | Apps | Goals | Apps | Goals | Apps | Goals | Apps | Goals | Apps | Goals |
|---|---|---|---|---|---|---|---|---|---|---|---|---|
| Nancy B | 2008–09 | CFA | 9 | 0 | — | | — | | — | | 9 | 0 |
| Nancy B | 2009–10 | CFA | 9 | 0 | — | | — | | — | | 9 | 0 |
| Al-Duhail | 2010–11 | QSL | 20 | 1 | 2 | 0 | — | | 1 (Note: Appearance in Qatari Super Cup) | 0 | 23 | 1 |
| Al-Duhail | 2011–12 | QSL | 19 | 1 | 1 | 0 | 5 (Note: Appearance(s) in AFC Champions League) | 0 | — | | 25 | 1 |
| Al-Duhail | 2012–13 | QSL | 20 | 0 | 2 | 0 | 10 | 0 | ="2"|— | | 32 | 0 |
| Al-Duhail | 2013–14 | QSL | 21 | 2 | 1 | 0 | 8 | 1 | — | | 30 | 3 |
| Al-Duhail | 2014–15 | QSL | 16 | 1 | 1 | 0 | 10 | 0 | — | | 27 | 1 |
| Al-Duhail | 2015–16 | QSL | 22 | 2 | 2 | 0 | 7 | 1 | — | | 31 | 3 |
| Al-Duhail | 2016–17 | QSL | 25 | 3 | 2 | 0 | 7 | 0 | — | | 32 | 3 |
| Al-Duhail | 2017–18 | QSL | 15 | 2 | 1 | 1 | 9 | 4 | 1 | 0 | 18 | 6 |
| Al-Duhail | 2018–19 | QSL | 17 | 1 | 0 | 0 | 6 | 1 | 1 | 0 | | |
| Al-Duhail | 2019–20 | QSL | 22 | 4 | 3 | 0 | 4 | 0 | 1 (Note: Appearance in FIFA Club World Cup) | 0 | | |
| Al-Duhail | 2020–21 | QSL | 16 | 0 | 2 | 0 | 6 | 0 | 2 | 0 | 26 | 0 |
| Al-Duhail | 2021–22 | QSL | 12 | 0 | 3 | 1 | 6 | 1 | 0 | 0 | 21 | 1 |
| Al-Duhail | 2022–23 | QSL | 10 | 0 | 1 | 0 | 3 | 0 | | | | |
| Al-Duhail | 2023–24 | QSL | 17 | 1 | 2 | 0 | 3 | 0 | | | | |
| Al-Duhail | 2024–25 | QSL | 10 | 0 | 0 | 0 | 0 | 0 | 4 (Note: appearance in Qatari Stars Cup) | 0 | 14 | 0 |
| Al-Duhail | Total | | 262 | 17 | 23 | 2 | 87 | 9 | 8 | 0 | 380 | 28 |
| Career total | | | 280 | 17 | 23 | 2 | 87 | 9 | 8 | 0 | 398 | 28 |

=== International ===
Scores and results list Qatar's goal tally first.

List of international goals scored by Karim Boudiaf
| No. | Date | Venue | Opponent | Score | Result | Competition |
|---|---|---|---|---|---|---|
| 1. | 31 May 2015 | Gresty Road, Crewe, England | Northern Ireland | 1–1 | 1–1 | Friendly |
| 2. | 8 September 2015 | Mong Kok Stadium, Mong Kok, Hong Kong | Hong Kong | 1–0 | 3–2 | 2018 FIFA World Cup qualification |
| 3. | 8 October 2015 | Jassim Bin Hamad Stadium, Doha, Qatar | China | 1–0 | 1–0 | 2018 FIFA World Cup qualification |
| 4. | 10 November 2016 | Jassim Bin Hamad Stadium, Doha, Qatar | Russia | 2–1 | 2–1 | Friendly |
| 5. | 10 October 2019 | Bangabandhu National Stadium, Dhaka, Bangladesh | Bangladesh | 2–0 | 2–0 | 2022 FIFA World Cup qualification |
| 6. | 5 November 2022 | Estadio Municipal de Marbella, Marbella, Spain | Panama | 2–0 | 2–1 | Friendly |

== Honours ==
Al-Duhail

- Qatar Stars League: 2010–11, 2011–12, 2013–14, 2014–15, 2016–17, 2017–18, 2019–20
- Qatar Cup: 2013, 2015, 2018
- Sheikh Jassem Cup: 2015, 2016
- Emir of Qatar Cup: 2016, 2018, 2019, 2022

Qatar

- AFC Asian Cup: 2019
- WAFF Championship: 2014
- Arabian Gulf Cup: 2014

Individual

- Qatar Stars League Team of the Year: 2017–18
