= Ali Karami-ye Olya =

Village in Kohgiluyeh and Boyer-Ahmad, Iran

Ali Karami-ye Olya علي كرمي عليا
- Village
- Location within Iran
- Coordinates: 30°50′44″N 51°14′30″E
- Country: Iran
- Province: Kohgiluyeh and Boyer-Ahmad
- County: Dana
- Bakhsh: Kabgian
- Rural District: Chenar

Population (2006)
  - Total: 67
- Time zone: UTC+3:30 (IRST)
  - Summer (DST): UTC+4:30 (IRDT)

Ali Karami-ye Olya (Persian: علي كرمي عليا, also Romanized as ‘Alī Karamī-ye ‘Olyā; also known as ‘Alī Karamī and Deh Now-e ‘Alī Karamī) is a village in Chenar Rural District, Kabgian District, Dana County, Kohgiluyeh and Boyer-Ahmad Province, Iran. At the 2006 census, its population was 67, in 14 families.
