= 2019 Amir of Qatar Cup =

Amir Cup 2019 (Qatar)
Tournament details
- Country: Qatar
- Dates: 11 April - 16 May
- Teams: 17 teams

Final positions
- Champions: Al-Duhail (3rd title)
- Runners-up: Al Sadd

Tournament statistics
- Matches played: 16 matches

The 2019 Amir of Qatar Cup (and first edition under the new name Amir Cup) was the 47th edition of the Qatari cup tournament in men's football. It was played by the first and second level divisions of the Qatari football league structure. The cup winner was guaranteed a place in the 2020 AFC Champions League.

The draw of the tournament was held on 15 April 2019.

Note: all matches in Qatar time (GMT+3).

== Preliminary round ==
| 11 April 2019 | Al-Shamal | 2–1 | Al-Mesaimeer | Doha |
| 18:30 | | | | Stadium: Abdullah bin Khalifa Stadium |

== First round ==
| 20 April 2019 | Al-Shamal | 1–3 | Umm Salal | Al Rayyan |
| 17:15 | | | | Stadium: Thani bin Jassim Stadium |

| 20 April 2019 | Al-Wakrah | 2–2 (3–4 p) | Al-Khor | Al Rayyan |
| 20:00 | | | | Stadium: Thani bin Jassim Stadium |

| 21 April 2019 | Al-Markhiya | 5–3 | Al Kharaitiyat | Doha |
| 17:15 | | | | Stadium: Grand Hamad Stadium |

| 21 April 2019 | Muaither | 0–1 | Qatar SC | Doha |
| 20:00 | | | | Stadium: Grand Hamad Stadium |

== Second round ==
| 26 April 2019 | Umm Salal | 1–3 | Al-Arabi | Doha |
| 17:15 | | | | Stadium: Grand Hamad Stadium |

| 26 April 2019 | Al-Khor | 2–5 | Al-Gharafa | Doha |
| 20:00 | | | | Stadium: Grand Hamad Stadium |

| 27 April 2019 | Al-Markhiya | 1–4 | Al-Shahania | Al Rayyan |
| 17:15 | | | | Stadium: Thani bin Jassim Stadium |

| 27 April 2019 | Qatar SC | 0–1 | Al Ahli | Al Rayyan |
| 20:00 | | | | Stadium: Thani bin Jassim Stadium |

== Quarter-finals ==
| 2 May 2019 | Al-Shahania | 0–2 | Al-Duhail | Doha |
| 17:15 | | | | Stadium: Abdullah bin Khalifa Stadium |

| 2 May 2019 | Al-Gharafa | 2–4 | Al-Sadd | Doha |
| 20:00 | Taremi 78'; Seraj 89' | Report | Khoukhi 17'; Bounedjah 45', 90+2'; Afif 75' | Stadium: Abdullah bin Khalifa Stadium; Referee: Khamis Mohamed Al Kuwari |

| 3 May 2019 | Al Ahli | 2–3 | Al-Sailiya | Doha |
| 17:15 | | | | Stadium: Grand Hamad Stadium |

| 3 May 2019 | Al-Arabi | 2–2 (2–4 p) | Al-Rayyan | Doha |
| 20:00 | | | | Stadium: Grand Hamad Stadium |

== Semi-finals ==
| 11 May 2019 | Al-Rayyan | 0–2 | Al-Sadd | Doha |
| 22:30 | | Report | Asad 12'; Bounedjah 84' | Stadium: Jassim Bin Hamad Stadium; Referee: Salman Ahmad Flahi |

| 12 May 2019 | Al-Sailiya | 0–3 | Al-Duhail | Doha |
| 22:30 | | | | Stadium: Jassim Bin Hamad Stadium |

== Final ==
| 16 May 2019 | Al-Sadd | 1 – 4 | Al-Duhail | Al Janoub Stadium, Al Wakrah |
| 22:30 | Akram Afif 7' | Report | Ali Afif 16'; Junior 59', 81'; El-Arabi 62' | Attendance: 38,678; Referee: Abdulrahman Al-Jassim (Qatar) |

| GK | 1 | (Qatar) Saad Al Sheeb |
| DF | 2 | (Qatar) Pedro Miguel |
| DF | 3 | (Qatar) Abdelkarim Hassan |
| MF | 5 | (South Korea) Jung Woo-young | (substituted off) 65' |
| MF | 15 | (Qatar) Tarek Salman | (red card) 54' |
| MF | 16 | (Qatar) Boualem Khoukhi |
| MF | 14 | (Spain) Gabi |
| MF | 6 | (Spain) Xavi (c) |
| MF | 10 | (Qatar) Hassan Al-Haidos | (substituted off) 66' |
| FW | 78 | (Qatar) Akram Afif | (yellow card) 35' |
| FW | 11 | (Algeria) Baghdad Bounedjah | (yellow card) 60' (yellow-red card) 90+2' |
Substitutes :
| GK | 22 | (Qatar) Meshaal Barsham |
| DF | 12 | (Qatar) Hamid Ismail | (substituted on) 66' | (red card) 90+1' |
| MF | 8 | (Qatar) Ali Assadalla | (substituted on) 65' |
| DF | 29 | (Qatar) Salem Al-Hajri |
| DF | 66 | (Qatar) Yasser Abubakar |
| FW | 17 | (Qatar) Hassan Ahmad |
| MF | 87 | (Qatar) Sauoud Ebrahim |
Manager :
(Portugal) Jesualdo Ferreira

| GK | 40 | (Qatar) Amine Lecomte |
| DF | 4 | (Morocco) Medhi Benatia |
| DF | 2 | (Qatar) Mohammed Musa |
| DF | 6 | (Qatar) Ahmed Yasser |
| MF | 15 | (Qatar) Assim Madibo |
| MF | 10 | (Japan) Shoya Nakajima | (substituted off) 46' |
| MF | 17 | (Belgium) Edmilson Junior | (substituted off) 90+4' |
| MF | 20 | (Qatar) Ali Afif |
| MF | 8 | (Qatar) Luiz Júnior (c) |
| FW | 11 | (Qatar) Mohammed Muntari |
| FW | 19 | (Qatar) Almoez Ali | (yellow card) 17' (yellow-red card) 26' |
Substitutes :
| GK | 16 | (Qatar) Khalifa Ababacar |
| FW | 9 | (Morocco) Youssef El-Arabi | (substituted on) 46' |
| MF | 13 | (Qatar) Hazem Shahata | (substituted on) 90+4' |
| MF | 14 | (Qatar) Abdullah Al-Ahrak |
| MF | 21 | (Qatar) Khalid Muneer |
| DF | 22 | (Qatar) Murad Naji |
| | 37 | (Qatar) Rabeh Yahya |
Manager :
(Portugal) Rui Faria

Man of the Match:

Assistant referees:
Taleb Salem (Qatar)
Saud Ahmed (Qatar)
Fourth official:
Khamis Mohamed Al Kuwari (Qatar)
Assistant video assistant referees:
Salman Ahmad Flahi (Qatar)
Abdullah Al Adba (Qatar)
Khaled Ayed (Qatar)

Match rules

- 90 minutes.
- 30 minutes of extra time if necessary.
- Penalty shoot-out if scores still level.
- Seven named substitutes, of which up to three may be used.
