= 2015–16 Qatar Stars League =

52nd season of top-tier football league in Qatar

Qatar Stars League
- Season: 2015–16
- Champions: Al-Rayyan (8th title)
- Relegated: Qatar SC; Mesaimeer
- AFC Champions League: Al-Rayyan; Lekhwiya; El Jaish; Al Sadd
- Matches: 182
- Goals: 561 (3.08 per match)
- Top goalscorer: (Morocco) Abderrazak Hamdallah (Qatar) Rodrigo Tabata (21 goals each)
- Biggest home win: Lekhwiya 7-0 Al Kharaitiyat (26 September 2015)
- Biggest away win: Qatar SC 0-9 Al-Rayyan (22 November 2015)
- Highest scoring: Qatar SC 0-9 Al-Rayyan (22 November 2015); Lekhwiya 4–5 Al Ahli (10 April 2016)
- Longest winning run: 11 games Al-Rayyan
- Longest unbeaten run: 11 games Al-Rayyan
- Longest winless run: 20 games Mesaimeer
- Longest losing run: 9 games Mesaimeer

The 2015–16 Qatar Stars League was the 43rd edition of top level football championship in Qatar. The season started on 11 September 2015. Lekhwiya were the defending champions having won their fourth championship. Al-Rayyan secured their 8th title on 5 March with five games remaining.

== Teams ==
=== Stadia and locations ===
Locations of teams in the 2015–16 Qatari League

Club	City/Town	Stadium	Head coach
Al Ahli	Doha	Hamad bin Khalifa Stadium	(Qatar) Yousuf Adam
Al-Arabi	Doha	Grand Hamad Stadium	(Italy) Gianfranco Zola
Al-Gharafa	Al Gharrafa	Thani bin Jassim Stadium	(Portugal) Pedro Caixinha
Al Kharaitiyat	Al Kharaitiyat	Al-Khor SC Stadium	(Bosnia and Herzegovina) Amar Osim
Al-Khor	Al Khor	Al-Khor SC Stadium	(France) Jean Fernandez
Al-Rayyan	Al Rayyan	Jassim bin Hamad Stadium	(Uruguay) Jorge Fossati
Al Sadd	Doha	Jassim bin Hamad Stadium	(Portugal) Jesualdo Ferreira
Al-Sailiya	Al Sailiya	Ahmad bin Ali Stadium	(Tunisia) Sami Trabelsi
Al-Wakrah	Al Wakrah	Saoud bin Abdulrahman Stadium	(Uruguay) Mauricio Larriera
El Jaish	Duhail	Abdullah bin Khalifa Stadium	(France) Sabri Lamouchi
Lekhwiya	Doha	Abdullah bin Khalifa Stadium	(Algeria) Djamel Belmadi
Mesaimeer	Mesaimeer	Al-Seliah Stadium	(Croatia) Rodion Gačanin
Qatar SC	Doha	Suheim bin Hamad Stadium	(Brazil) Sebastião Lazaroni
Umm Salal	Umm Salal	Suheim bin Hamad Stadium	(Turkey) Bülent Uygun

=== Foreign players ===
Club	Player 1	Player 2	Player 3	AFC Player	Former players
Al Ahli	(Democratic Republic of the Congo) Ndombe Mubele	(Iran) Mojtaba Jabbari	(Morocco) Mouhcine Iajour	(Iran) Pejman Montazeri	(Argentina) Danilo Carando (Democratic Republic of the Congo) Patou Kabangu
Al-Arabi	(Brazil) Allan Sousa	(Brazil) Paulinho	(Iran) Ashkan Dejagah	(Iran) Javad Nekounam	(Brazil) Junior Dutra (France) Rod Fanni
Al-Gharafa	(Brazil) Anderson Martins	(Hungary) Krisztián Németh	(Slovakia) Vladimír Weiss	(Iran) Masoud Shojaei	(Democratic Republic of the Congo) Dioko Kaluyituka (Tunisia) Yassine Chikhaoui
Al Kharaitiyat	(Brazil) Domingos	(Burkina Faso) Yahia Kébé	(Senegal) Issiar Dia	(Jordan) Hassan Abdel-Fattah	(Morocco) Anouar Diba
Al-Khor	(Brazil) Júlio César	(Brazil) Madson	(Brazil) Marco Antônio	(South Korea) Heo Jae-won	(South Korea) Lee Yong (South Korea) Park Hee-do
Al-Rayyan	(Paraguay) Víctor Cáceres	(Spain) Sergio García	(Uruguay) Gonzalo Viera	(South Korea) Koh Myong-jin	
Al Sadd	(Algeria) Baghdad Bounedjah	(Algeria) Nadir Belhadj	(Spain) Xavi	(Iran) Morteza Pouraliganji	(Brazil) Muriqui (South Korea) Lee Jung-soo
Al-Sailiya	(Cameroon) Raoul Loé	(Colombia) Carlos Preciado	(Romania) Dragoș Grigore	(Bahrain) Faouzi Aaish	(Brazil) Edinho
Al-Wakrah	(Argentina) Sebastián Sáez	(Morocco) Mohsine Moutouali	(Portugal) Ruben Amorim	(Iraq) Ali Rehema	(Argentina) Gastón Sangoy
El Jaish	(Brazil) Lucas Mendes	(Brazil) Romarinho	(Morocco) Abderrazak Hamdallah	(Uzbekistan) Sardor Rashidov	
Lekhwiya	(Democratic Republic of the Congo) Dioko Kaluyituka	(Spain) Chico Flores	(Tunisia) Youssef Msakni	(South Korea) Nam Tae-hee	(Slovakia) Vladimír Weiss
Mesaimeer	(Brazil) Erivelto	(Mali) Adama Traoré	(Tunisia) Wajdi Bouazzi	(Iran) Mohammad Nouri	(Brazil) Rafael Amorim (Ivory Coast) Herman Kakou (Portugal) Hélio Pinto
Qatar SC	(Algeria) Rafik Halliche	(Argentina) Danilo Carando	(Argentina) Emiliano Vecchio	(South Korea) Han Kook-young	(Burkina Faso) Moumouni Dagano (Morocco) Ismail Belmaalem (Morocco) Mouhcine Iajour (Tunisia) Hamdi Harbaoui
Umm Salal	(Brazil) Welinton	(Ivory Coast) Yannick Sagbo	(Morocco) Mounir El Hamdaoui	(Uzbekistan) Sanzhar Tursunov	(France) Jérémie Aliadière (Iran) Andranik Teymourian

== League table ==
Pos	Team	Pld	W	D	L	GF	GA	GD	Pts	Qualification or relegation
1	Al-Rayyan (C)	26	20	2	4	69	23	+46	62	2017 AFC Champions League group stage
2	El Jaish	26	14	6	6	48	29	+19	48	2017 AFC Champions League second qualifying round
3	Al Sadd	26	13	8	5	54	38	+16	47	2017 AFC Champions League second qualifying round
4	Lekhwiya	26	14	2	10	60	41	+19	44	2017 AFC Champions League group stage (Note: Lekhwiya qualified for the 2017 AFC Champions League by winning the 2016 Emir of Qatar Cup.)
5	Umm Salal	26	10	11	5	39	34	+5	41	
6	Al Ahli	26	10	7	9	42	40	+2	37	
7	Al-Sailiya	26	11	3	12	40	46	−6	36	
8	Al-Arabi	26	10	5	11	33	37	−4	35	
9	Al-Gharafa	26	9	7	10	33	37	−4	34	
10	Al-Khor	26	9	6	11	25	31	−6	33	
11	Al-Wakrah	26	9	3	14	34	45	−11	30	
12	Al Kharaitiyat	26	7	6	13	38	47	−9	27	
13	Qatar SC (R)	26	6	9	11	31	51	−20	27	Relegation to the Qatari Second Division
14	Mesaimeer (R)	26	1	3	22	15	62	−47	6	Relegation to the Qatari Second Division

Updated to match(es) played on 16 April 2016. Source: RSSSF and Standings
Rules for classification: 1) points; 2) goal difference; 3) number of goals scored.
(C) Champions; (R) Relegated
