= Herman Kakou =

Ivorian footballer

Personal information
- Date of birth: 28 December 1988 (age 37)
- Place of birth: Prikro, Ivory Coast
- Position: Midfielder

Senior career*
Years	Team	Apps	(Gls)
2014–2015	Saint-Colomban Locminé		
2015–2016	Al-Mesaimeer SC		
2016	Al Ittihad		
2016–2017	Al Masry		
2019–?	Al-Mesaimeer SC?		
- * Club domestic league appearances and goals

Herman Kakou (born 20 August 1991) is an Ivorian professional footballer who plays as a midfielder.
