= Edmilson Junior =

Qatari footballer (born 1999)

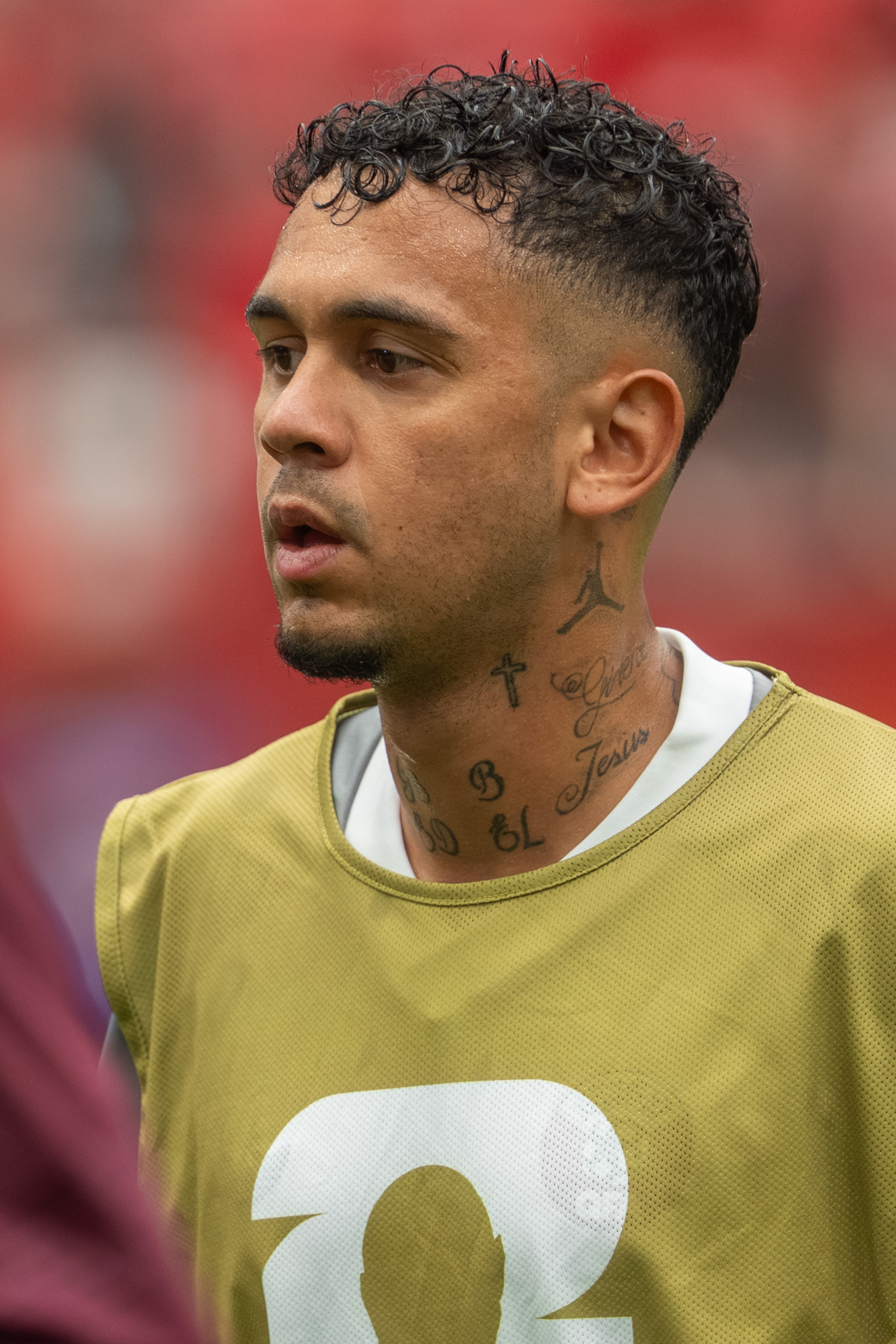
- Edmilson with Qatar in 2026

Personal information
- Full name: Edmilson Paulo da Silva Junior
- Date of birth: 19 August 1994 (age 32)
- Place of birth: Liège, Belgium
- Height: 1.82 m (6 ft 0 in)
- Position: Winger

Team information
- Current team: Al Duhail
- Number: 10

Youth career
- 2003–2005: Seraing
- 2005–2006: HFC Hoei
- 2006–2012: Standard Liège

Senior career*
Years	Team	Apps	(Gls)
2012–2016	Sint-Truiden	100	(10)
2016–2018	Standard Liège	90	(21)
2018–	Al-Duhail	113	(36)

International career^{‡}
2024–	Qatar	19	(0)
- * Club domestic league appearances and goals as of 17 January 2026 (UTC) ‡ National team caps and goals as of 19 August 2026

Edmilson Paulo da Silva Junior (born 19 August 1994) is a professional footballer who plays as a winger for Qatari club Al-Duhail. Born in Belgium, he plays for the Qatar national team.

== Club career ==
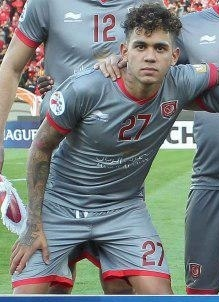
Edmilson with Al-Duhail in 2018

On 22 August 2012, Edmilson made his debut for Sint-Truiden in the Belgian Second Division as an 81st-minute substitute in the 3–1 win over KV Oostende. His first goal for the club came later that year in November, during the Belgian Cup tie against KVC Westerlo which ended 5–5. Sint-Truiden won the tie on penalties. On 6 January 2016, after making 87 appearances and scoring 9 goals for Sint-Truiden, Edmilson left to rejoin former club Standard Liège where he made a reunion with former Sint-Truiden manager Yannick Ferrera. He signed a three-year contract.

On 17 March 2018 he played as Standard Liège beat Genk 1–0 in extra time to win the 2018 Belgian Cup Final and qualify for the UEFA Europa League.

On 22 July 2018, he announced that would leave the club, and play for Qatari club Al-Duhail SC.

== International career ==
Despite Edmilson being eligible for Brazil and Belgium, he made his debut for the Qatar national team on 10 September 2024 in a World Cup qualifier against North Korea at the New Laos National Stadium in Laos. He substituted Jassem Gaber in the 72nd minute of a 2–2 draw.

== Personal life ==
Edmilson Junior's father, Edmílson, is a Brazilian former footballer who played for Standard Liège and Seraing in Belgium from 2016 to 2018

== Career statistics ==
=== Club ===
As of match played 24 December 2024

Appearances and goals by club, season and competition
Club	Season	League			National cup (Note: Includes Belgian Cup)		Continental		Other		Total	
Club	Season	Division	Apps	Goals	Apps	Goals	Apps	Goals	Apps	Goals	Apps	Goals
Sint-Truiden	2012–13	Belgian Second Division	26	1	4	1	—		—		30	2
Sint-Truiden	2013–14	Belgian Second Division	19	1	0	0	—		5 (Note: Appearances in Belgian Second Division play-offs)	0	24	1
Sint-Truiden	2014–15	Belgian Second Division	23	2	2	0	—		—		25	2
Sint-Truiden	2015–16	Belgian Pro League	19	5	2	0	—		—		21	5
Sint-Truiden	Total		87	9	8	1	0	0	5	0	100	10
Standard Liège	2015–16	Belgian Pro League	11	2	3	1	0	0	0	0	14	3
Standard Liège	2016–17	Belgian Pro League	27	5	1	0	6 (Note: Appearances in UEFA Europa League)	0	5 (Note: One appearance in Belgian Super Cup, four appearances in the Belgian Pro League UEFA Europa League play-offs)	1	39	6
Standard Liège	2017–18	Belgian Pro League	34	10	3	1	0	0	0	0	37	11
Standard Liège	Total		72	17	7	2	6	0	5	1	90	20
Al-Duhail	2018–19	Qatar Stars League	22	4	5	4	2 (Note: Appearances in AFC Champions League)	0	1 (Note: Appearance in Qatari Sheikh Jassim Cup)	0	30	8
Al-Duhail	2019–20	Qatar Stars League	19	6	3	2	8	2	0	0	30	10
Al-Duhail	2020–21	Qatar Stars League	16	12	1	0	4	1	7 (Note: Three appearances and two goals in Emir Cup, two appearances in Qatar Cup, two appearances in FIFA Club World Cup)	2	28	15
Al-Duhail	2021–22	Qatar Stars League	17	6	0	0	6	1	4 (Note: Appearances in Emir Cup)	1	27	8
Al-Duhail	2022–23	Qatar Stars League	5	0	0	0	8	8	0	0	13	8
Al-Duhail	2023–24	Qatar Stars League	0	0	0	0	0	0	0	0	0	0
Al-Duhail	2024–25	Qatar Stars League	11	6	0	0	0	0	0	0	11	6
Al-Duhail	Total		91	33	9	6	28	12	12	3	139	54
Career total			249	61	24	8	34	12	22	4	329	85

=== International ===
As of match played 24 June 2026

Appearances and goals by national team and year
National team	Year	Apps	Goals
Qatar	2024	3	0
Qatar	2025	11	0
Qatar	2026	5	0
Total		19	0

== Honours ==
Sint-Truiden

- Belgian Second Division: 2014–15

Standard

- Belgian Cup: 2015–16, 2017–18

Al-Duhail

- Qatar Stars League: 2019–20
- Qatar Emir Cup: 2019, 2022

Individual

- AFC Champions League top scorer: 2022
