= 2017–18 Qatar Stars League =

54th season of top-tier football league in Qatar

Qatar Stars League
- Season: 2017–18
- Champions: Al Duhail
- Relegated: Al Kharaitiyat; Al-Markhiya
- AFC Champions League: Al Duhail; Al Sadd; Al-Rayyan; Al-Gharafa
- Top goalscorer: (Morocco) Youssef El-Arabi (Tunisia) Youssef Msakni (24 goals each)

The 2017–18 Qatari League, also known as Qatar Stars League, was the 45th edition of top-level football championship in Qatar.

== Teams ==
=== Stadia and locations ===
Club	City/Town	Stadium	Coach
Al Ahli	Doha	Hamad bin Khalifa Stadium	(Spain) Jorge Peris
Al-Arabi	Doha	Grand Hamad Stadium	(Croatia) Luka Bonačić
Al Duhail	Doha	Abdullah bin Khalifa Stadium	(Algeria) Djamel Belmadi
Al-Gharafa	Doha	Thani bin Jassim Stadium	(Turkey) Bülent Uygun
Al Kharaitiyat	Al Khor	Al-Khor SC Stadium	(Syria) Yassir Al Sobaie
Al-Khor	Al Khor	Al-Khor SC Stadium	(Tunisia) Nacif Beyaoui
Al-Markhiya	Al Wakrah	Jassim Bin Hamad Stadium	(Tunisia) Adel Sellimi
Al-Rayyan	Al-Rayyan	Ahmed bin Ali Stadium	(Denmark) Michael Laudrup
Al Sadd	Doha	Jassim Bin Hamad Stadium	(Portugal) Jesualdo Ferreira
Al-Sailiya	Doha	Hamad bin Khalifa Stadium	(Tunisia) Sami Trabelsi
Qatar SC	Doha	Hamad bin Suhaim Al Thani Stadium	(Argentina) Gabriel Calderón
Umm Salal	Doha	Suheim Bin Hamad Stadium	(Morocco) Talal El Karkouri

=== Foreign players ===
The total number of foreign players is restricted to nine per club. Clubs can register up to four professional foreign players, of which a maximum of three are allowed from nations outside the Asian Football Confederation (AFC).

- Players name in **bold** indicates the player was registered during the mid-season transfer window.
- Players name in italic indicates the player was de-registered or left the club during the mid-season transfer window.

Club	Player 1	Player 2	Player 3	AFC player	Former players
Al Ahli	(Mozambique) Simão Mate Junior	(Tunisia) **Hamza Younés**	(Tunisia) Yassine Chikhaoui	(Syria) Hadi Al Masri	(Colombia) Cristian Nazarit (South Korea) Kim Gwi-hyeon
Al-Arabi	(Brazil) Diego Jardel	(Croatia) **Ivan Fuštar**	(Ghana) **Kwame Karikari**	(Iraq) Saad Natiq	(Syria) Mardik Mardikian (Tunisia) Ammar Jemal
Al Duhail	(Brazil) Lucas Mendes	(Morocco) Youssef El-Arabi	(Tunisia) Youssef Msakni	(South Korea) Nam Tae-hee	
Al-Gharafa	(Netherlands) **Wesley Sneijder**	(Portugal) Diogo Amado	(Venezuela) Rubert Quijada	(Iran) **Mehdi Taremi**	(Chile) Luis Jiménez (Slovakia) Vladimír Weiss
Al Kharaitiyat	(Ivory Coast) Josue Mohy	(Morocco) Anouar Diba	(Morocco) Rachid Tiberkanine	(Uzbekistan) Sanzhar Tursunov	
Al-Khor	(Brazil) Luciano Castán	(Brazil) Madson	(Cameroon) **Ariel Ngueukam**	(Iran) Soroush Rafiei	(Brazil) David da Silva (Cameroon) Julien Ebah
Al-Markhiya	(Brazil) **Eric de Oliveira**	(Brazil) **Léo Mineiro**	(The Gambia) Tijan Jaiteh	(Iraq) Rebin Sulaka	(Burkina Faso) Alain Traoré (Ghana) Kwame Karikari
Al-Rayyan	(Morocco) Abderrazak Hamdallah	(Morocco) Mohsine Moutouali	(Uruguay) Gonzalo Viera	(South Korea) Koh Myong-jin	(France) **Yohan Mollo**
Al Sadd	(Algeria) Baghdad Bounedjah	(Algeria) Jugurtha Hamroun	(Spain) Xavi	(Iran) Morteza Pouraliganji	
Al-Sailiya	(Algeria) Nadir Belhadj	(Romania) Dragoș Grigore	(Romania) Valentin Lazăr	(Uzbekistan) Temurkhuja Abdukholiqov	
Qatar SC	(Brazil) Bruno Gallo	(Chile) **Luis Jiménez**	(Syria) **Osama Omari**	(Timor-Leste) **Patrick Fabiano**	(Central African Republic) Habib Habibou (Iran) Mohammad Tayyebi (Iran) **Sajjad Shahbazzadeh** (Nigeria) Michael Babatunde
Umm Salal	(Ivory Coast) Yannick Sagbo	(Morocco) Adil Rhaili	(Tunisia) **Oussama Darragi**	(Syria) Mahmoud Al-Mawas	(Morocco) Youssef Sekour

== League table ==
Pos	Team	Pld	W	D	L	GF	GA	GD	Pts	Qualification or relegation
1	Al Duhail	22	19	3	0	86	27	+59	60	Qualification to 2019 AFC Champions League group stage
2	Al Sadd	22	16	1	5	68	25	+43	49	Qualification to 2019 AFC Champions League group stage
3	Al-Rayyan	22	13	4	5	54	39	+15	43	Qualification to 2019 AFC Champions League play-off round
4	Al-Gharafa	22	10	5	7	43	34	+9	35	Qualification to 2019 AFC Champions League play-off round
5	Umm Salal	22	8	9	5	33	34	−1	33	
6	Al-Sailiya	22	8	4	10	40	42	−2	28	
7	Al-Arabi	22	6	6	10	30	42	−12	24	
8	Qatar SC	22	7	3	12	24	46	−22	24	
9	Al-Khor	22	6	4	12	25	39	−14	22	
10	Al Ahli	22	6	4	12	24	43	−19	22	
11	Al Kharaitiyat	22	4	4	14	29	62	−33	16	Relegation to 2018–19 Qatargas League
12	Al-Markhiya	22	2	7	13	19	42	−23	13	Relegation to 2018–19 Qatargas League

Updated to match(es) played on 4 April. Source: RSSSF, Qatar Stars League, and FIFA
Rules for classification: 1) Points; 2) Goal difference; 3) Number of goals scored;

== Statistics ==
=== Top scorers ===
Rank	Player	Club	Goals
1	(Morocco) Youssef El-Arabi	Al Duhail	24
1	(Tunisia) Youssef Msakni	Al Duhail	24
3	(Morocco) Abderrazak Hamdallah	Al-Rayyan	18
4	(Algeria) Baghdad Bounedjah	Al Sadd	16
5	(Qatar) Rodrigo Tabata	Al-Rayyan	15
6	(Morocco) Rachid Tiberkanine	Al Kharaitiyat	13
7	(Algeria) Jugurtha Hamroun	Al Sadd	12
7	(Croatia) Wagner Ribeiro	Al-Sailiya	12
7	(South Korea) Nam Tae-hee	Al Duhail	12
10	(Brazil) Madson	Al-Khor	10
10	(Ivory Coast) Yannick Sagbo	Umm Salal	10
10	(Qatar) Sebastián Soria	Al-Rayyan	10
10	(Uzbekistan) Temurkhuja Abdukholiqov	Al-Sailiya	10
14	(Netherlands) Wesley Sneijder	Al-Gharafa	9

=== Team of the Year ===
No	Position		Player	Club
1	Goalkeeper	(Qatar)	Saad Al Sheeb	Al Sadd
2	Defender	(Qatar)	Hamid Ismail	Al Sadd
3	Defender	(Qatar)	Abdelkarim Hassan	Al Sadd
4	Defender	(Qatar)	Pedro Miguel	Al Sadd
5	Defender	(Brazil)	Lucas Mendes	Al Duhail
6	Midfielder	(Qatar)	Karim Boudiaf	Al Duhail
7	Midfielder	(Qatar)	Ahmed Abdul Maqsoud	Al-Rayyan
8	Midfielder	(Spain)	Xavi	Al Sadd
9	Midfielder	(Qatar)	Hassan Al-Haydos	Al Sadd
10	Forward	(Tunisia)	Youssef Msakni	Al Duhail
11	Forward	(Algeria)	Baghdad Bounedjah	Al Sadd
