= Ali Afif =

Qatari footballer (born 1988)

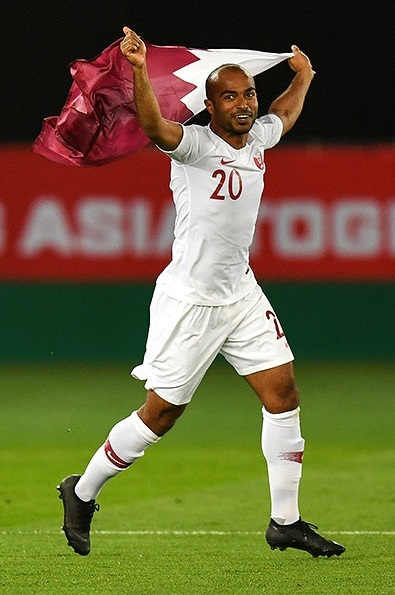
- Afif with Qatar at the 2019 AFC Asian Cup

Personal information
- Full name: Ali Hassan Afif Yahya
- Date of birth: 20 January 1988 (age 38)
- Place of birth: Doha, Qatar
- Height: 1.72 m (5 ft 8 in)
- Positions: Left-back; midfielder

Team information
- Current team: Umm Salal
- Number: 20

Youth career
- Al Markhiya
- 2002–2004: Al Sadd

Senior career*
Years	Team	Apps	(Gls)
2004–2012	Al Sadd	101	(28)
2012	→ Lekhwiya (loan)	4	(2)
2012–2023	Al-Duhail	161	(20)
2023–	Umm Salal	37	(0)

International career^{‡}
2003–2005	Qatar U17	8	(3)
2006–2019	Qatar	54	(9)
Medal record
Representing Qatar
AFC Asian Cup
Winner	UAE 2019	Team
- * Club domestic league appearances and goals as of 17 January 2026 ‡ National team caps and goals as of 27 March 2024

Ali Hassan Afif Yahya (Arabic: عَلِيّ حَسَن عَفِيف يَحْيَى; born 20 January 1988) is a Qatari footballer. He currently plays for Umm Salal and the Qatar national team as a left-back.

== Personal ==
Afif has six siblings. His father, Hassan Afif, is of Somali descent and was born in Moshi, Tanzania. His father previously played for Simba in Tanzania and Horseed in Somalia before relocating to Qatar and playing for Al Ittihad. He was later naturalized. After retiring, he managed Al Gharafa from 1986 till 1987 and Al Markhiya from 2001 till 2003 and 2006 till 2007. His mother, Fayza, comes from Yemen.

He has a brother, Akram Afif, who is also a member of Qatar's football team. He currently plays for Al Sadd.

== International career ==
=== International goals ===
Scores and results list Qatar's goal tally first.

No	Date	Venue	Opponent	Score	Result	Competition
1.	20 August 2008	Khalifa International Stadium, Doha, Qatar	Tajikistan	1–0	5–0	Friendly
–	30 December 2008	Thani bin Jassim Stadium, Doha, Qatar	Libya	5–2	5–2	Unofficial friendly
2.	26 May 2009	Jassim Bin Hamad Stadium, Doha, Qatar	Saudi Arabia	1–1	2–1	Friendly
3.	10 June 2009	International Stadium Yokohama, Yokohama, Japan	Japan	1–1	1–1	2010 FIFA World Cup qualification
4.	9 September 2009	Jassim Bin Hamad Stadium, Doha, Qatar	Oman	1–0	1–1	Friendly
5.	14 October 2009	Parc des Sports Michel Hidalgo, Paris, France	DR Congo	1–1	2–2	Friendly
6.	28 December 2009	Suheim Bin Hamad Stadium, Doha, Qatar	Iran	1–0	3–2	Friendly
7.	5 September 2013	Jassim Bin Hamad Stadium, Doha, Qatar	Mauritius	3–0	3–0	Friendly
8.	13 October 2013	Thani bin Jassim Stadium, Doha, Qatar	Yemen	6–0	6–0	2015 AFC Asian Cup qualification
9.	25 December 2018	Khalifa International Stadium, Doha, Qatar	Kyrgyzstan	1–0	1–0	Friendly

== Honours ==
=== Club ===
Al-Sadd

- Qatar Stars League: 2003–04, 2005–06, 2006–07
- Qatar Emir Cup: 2005, 2007
- Qatar Cup: 2006, 2007, 2008
- Qatari Sheikh Jassim Cup: 2006
- Qatari Stars Cup: 2010
- AFC Champions League: 2011
- FIFA Club World Cup bronze medalist: 2011

Al-Duhail

- Qatar Stars League: 2011–12, 2013–14, 2014–15, 2016–17, 2017–18, 2019–20, 2022–23
- Qatar Emir Cup: 2016, 2018, 2019, 2022
- Qatar Cup: 2013, 2015, 2018, 2023
- Qatari Sheikh Jassim Cup: 2015, 2016

=== International ===
Qatar

- AFC Asian Cup: 2019
