= Khalid Mohammed (footballer) =

English footballer

Personal information
- Full name: Khalid Abdi Mohammed
- Date of birth: 1998 (age 27–28)
- Place of birth: Manchester, England
- Position: Midfielder

Team information
- Current team: Bury
- Number: 35

Youth career
- –2016: Bury

Senior career*
| Years | Team | Apps | (Gls) |
| 2015–2016 | Bury | 1 | (0) |
- * Club domestic league appearances and goals as of 09:16, 21 October 2018 (UTC)

Khalid Abdi Mohammed (born 1998) is an English footballer who played for Bury as a midfielder.

== Career ==
Born in Manchester, Mohammed came through the academy at Bury and was offered a youth team contract on 12 March 2014.

He was first included in a matchday squad on 12 September 2015, remaining an unused substitute in a 1–0 League One win over Port Vale at Gigg Lane. On 24 October, he made his debut, replacing the injured Nathan Cameron for the final six minutes of a 2–0 loss at Shrewsbury Town.
