= Mohammed Muntari =

Qatari footballer (born 1993)

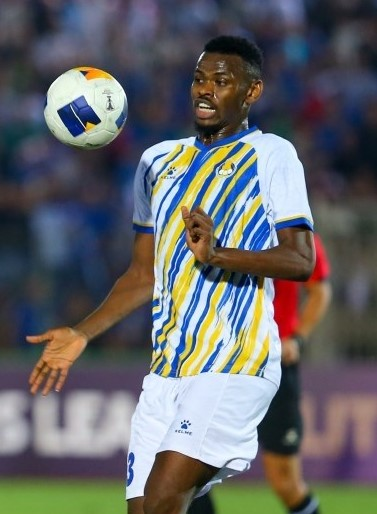
- Muntari in 2024

Personal information
- Full name: Mohammed Muntari
- Date of birth: 20 December 1993 (age 32)
- Place of birth: Kumasi, Ghana
- Height: 1.94 m (6 ft 4 in)
- Position: Striker

Team information
- Current team: Al-Gharafa
- Number: 3

Youth career
- Golden Lions Soccer Academy

Senior career*
| Years | Team | Apps | (Gls) |
| 2013–2015 | El Jaish | 45 | (18) |
| 2015–2024 | Al-Duhail | 85 | (26) |
| 2017–2018 | → Al Ahli (loan) | 9 | (3) |
| 2018 | → Al Ahli (loan) | 8 | (3) |
| 2024– | Al-Gharafa | 16 | (4) |

International career^{‡}
| 2016 | Qatar U23 | 4 | (0) |
| 2014– | Qatar | 65 | (16) |
Medal record
Representing Qatar
Men's Football
FIFA Arab Cup
| Third place | 2021 Qatar |
- * Club domestic league appearances and goals as of 17 January 2026 ‡ National team caps and goals as of 28 December 2024

Mohammed Muntari (Arabic: محمد مونتاري; born 20 December 1993) is a professional footballer who currently plays as a striker for Al-Gharafa. Born in Ghana, he plays for the Qatar national team.

== Career ==
Muntari started his career in the Golden Lions Soccer Academy, owned by former Ghanaian international Nii Lamptey. He joined El Jaish in 2012.

In July 2015, he signed a five-year deal with Lekhwiya.

== International career ==
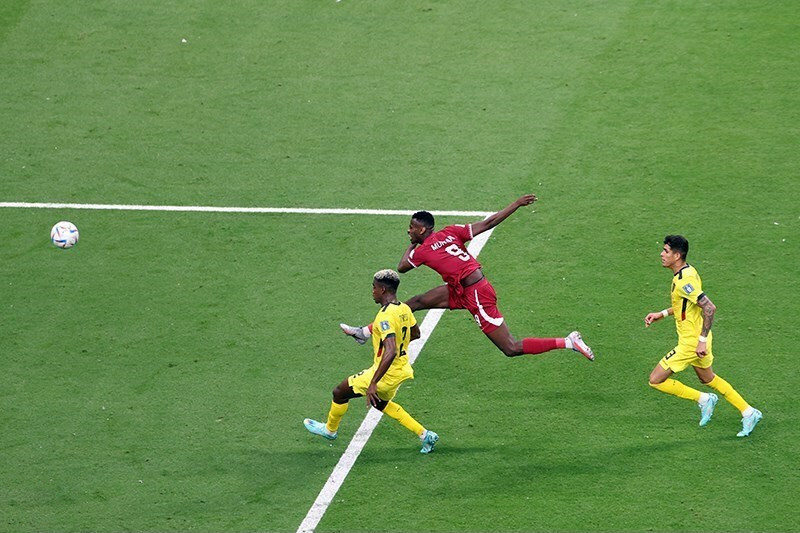
Muntari with Qatar at the 2022 FIFA World Cup opening game.

Muntari was born and raised in Ghana, but early in his career moved to Qatar and became a naturalized citizen. He was called up to the Qatar national team in December 2014. He made his debut on 27 December 2014 in a friendly against Estonia, scoring his first goal.

Muntari scored Qatar's first-ever World Cup goal during the 2022 FIFA World Cup against Senegal on 25 November 2022.

=== International goals ===
Scores and results list Qatar's goal tally first.

| No. | Date | Venue | Opponent | Score | Result | Competition |
|---|---|---|---|---|---|---|
| 1. | 27 December 2014 | Abdullah bin Khalifa Stadium, Doha, Qatar | Estonia | 1–0 | 3–0 | Friendly |
| 2. | 28 August 2015 | Jassim Bin Hamad Stadium, Doha, Qatar | Singapore | 2–0 | 4–0 | Friendly |
| 3. | 3 September 2015 | Jassim Bin Hamad Stadium, Doha, Qatar | Bhutan | 6–0 | 15–0 | 2018 FIFA World Cup qualification |
| 4. | 3 September 2015 | Jassim Bin Hamad Stadium, Doha, Qatar | Bhutan | 7–0 | 15–0 | 2018 FIFA World Cup qualification |
| 5. | 3 September 2015 | Jassim Bin Hamad Stadium, Doha, Qatar | Bhutan | 9–0 | 15–0 | 2018 FIFA World Cup qualification |
| 6. | 17 November 2015 | Changlimithang Stadium, Thimphu, Bhutan | Bhutan | 1–0 | 3–0 | 2018 FIFA World Cup qualification |
| 7. | 14 November 2017 | Abdullah bin Khalifa Stadium, Doha, Qatar | Iceland | 1–1 | 1–1 | Friendly |
| 8. | 14 November 2019 | Abdullah bin Khalifa Stadium, Doha, Qatar | Singapore | 1–0 | 2–0 | Friendly |
| 9. | 24 March 2021 | Nagyerdei Stadion, Debrecen, Hungary | Luxembourg | 1–0 | 1–0 | Friendly |
| 10. | 31 March 2021 | Nagyerdei Stadion, Debrecen, Hungary | Republic of Ireland | 1–1 | 1–1 | Friendly |
| 11. | 17 July 2021 | BBVA Stadium, Houston, United States | Grenada | 3–0 | 4–0 | 2021 CONCACAF Gold Cup |
| 12. | 15 December 2021 | Al Thumama Stadium, Doha, Qatar | Algeria | 1–1 | 1–2 | 2021 FIFA Arab Cup |
| 13. | 13 October 2022 | Marbella Football Center, Marbella, Spain | Nicaragua | 1–0 | 2–1 | Friendly |
| 14. | 25 November 2022 | Al Thumama Stadium, Doha, Qatar | Senegal | 1–2 | 1–3 | 2022 FIFA World Cup |
| 15. | 15 June 2023 | Stadion Wiener Neustadt, Wiener Neustadt, Austria | Jamaica | 2–0 | 2–1 | Friendly |
| 16. | 27 December 2024 | Jaber Al-Ahmad International Stadium, Kuwait City, Kuwait | Kuwait | 1–1 | 1–1 | 26th Arabian Gulf Cup |

== Honours ==
Al-Duhail

- Qatar Stars League: 2016–17, 2019–20
- Emir of Qatar Cup: 2016, 2019, 2022
- Sheikh Jassem Cup: 2015, 2016

El-Jaish

- Qatari Stars Cup: 2012–13
- Qatar Cup: 2014
