= Assim Madibo =

Qatari footballer (born 1996)

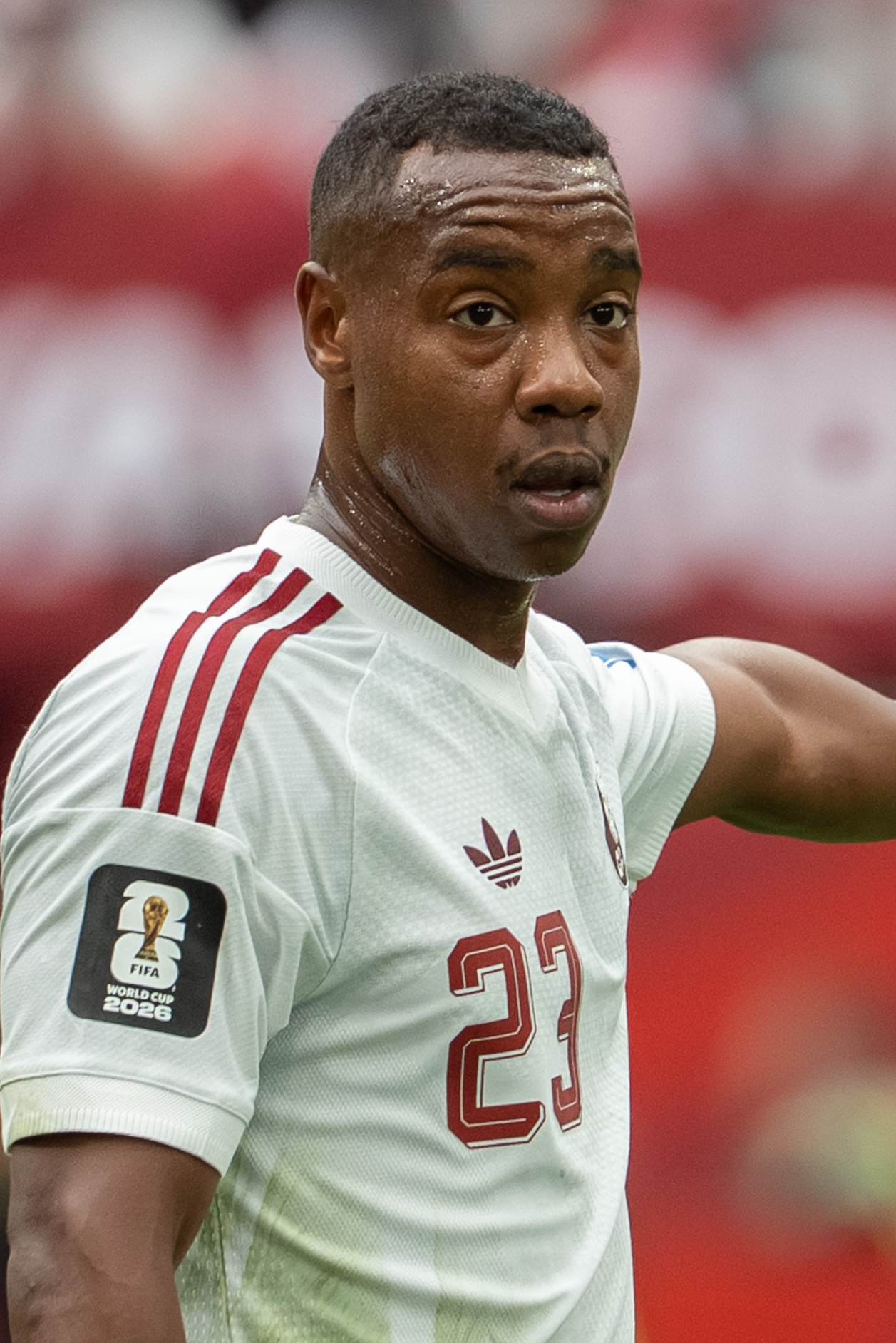
- Madibo with Qatar in 2026

Personal information
- Full name: Assim Omer Al Haj Madibo
- Date of birth: 22 October 1996 (age 30)
- Place of birth: Khartoum, Sudan
- Height: 1.68 m (5 ft 6 in)
- Position: Midfielder

Team information
- Current team: Al-Wakrah (on loan from Al-Duhail)
- Number: 18

Youth career
- 2014: Aspire Academy

Senior career*
Years	Team	Apps	(Gls)
2015–2016	LASK Linz	1	(0)
2015–2016	Pasching/LASK Linz II	4	(0)
2016	Cultural Leonesa	1	(0)
2016–	Al-Duhail	80	(0)
2017	→ Eupen (loan)	0	(0)
2018	→ Al-Gharafa (loan)	7	(0)
2024–2025	→ Al-Gharafa (loan)	15	(0)
2025–	→ Al-Wakrah (loan)	13	(0)

International career^{‡}
2014	Qatar U19	5	(0)
2014	Qatar U21	4	(0)
2015	Qatar U20	2	(0)
2016	Qatar U23	11	(0)
2017–	Qatar	53	(0)
Medal record
Representing Qatar
Men's Football
AFC Asian Cup
Winner	2019 UAE	Team
AFC U-19 Championship
Winner	2014 Myanmar	U-19
FIFA Arab Cup
Third place	2021
- * Club domestic league appearances and goals as of 25 June 2026 ‡ National team caps and goals as of 18 June 2026

Assim Omer Al Haj Madibo (Arabic: عاصم ماديبو; born 22 October 1996) is a professional footballer who plays as a midfielder for Al-Wakrah, on loan from Al-Duhail. Born in Sudan, he plays for the Qatar national team.

== Club career ==
Madibo joined the Aspire Academy in Qatar in July 2014.

In January 2015, Madibo joined the senior team of Austrian club LASK Linz. He made his professional league debut against Austria Lustenau on 13 August 2015. In January 2016, he left the club to join Cultural Leonesa.

It was announced that in July 2017 that Madibo was loaned to Belgian First Division A side Eupen from Lekhwiya for the duration of one season.

== International career ==
Madibo has represented Qatar at various age groups. He was a member of the Qatar national under-19 football team for the 2014 AFC U-19 Championship, which won the championship. He played in the 2015 FIFA U-20 World Cup for the Qatar national under-20 football team.

Madibo represented Qatar at the 2026 FIFA World Cup, which was hosted across the United States, Mexico and Canada. On June 18, Madibo received a red card for a challenge in his team's second group stage match against Canada, which caused a severe leg injury to Canadian midfielder Ismaël Koné; Madibo tackled from behind and kicked Koné's calf, causing a fracture. Madibo later apologised in the dressing room. Meanwhile, Qatar went on to lose 6–0, which became their heaviest-ever defeat. Afterwards, he was handed a five-match ban for causing the incident, following a disciplinary review.

== Honours ==
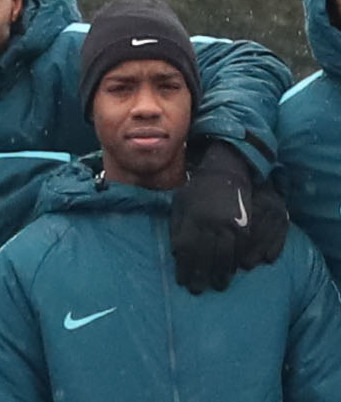
Madibo in January 2018

Al-Duhail

- Qatar Stars League: 2016–17, 2019–20
- Emir of Qatar Cup: 2019
- Qatari Sheikh Jassim Cup: 2016

Qatar U19

- AFC U-19 Championship: 2014

Qatar

- AFC Asian Cup: 2019
