= Mohammed Al-Bakri =

Qatari footballer (born 1997)

Personal information
- Full name: Mohammed Ahmed Al-Bakri
- Date of birth: 28 March 1997 (age 29)
- Place of birth: Doha, Qatar
- Height: 1.81 m (5 ft 11 in)
- Position: Goalkeeper

Team information
- Current team: Al-Wakrah
- Number: 1

Youth career
- –2015: Al-Wakrah

Senior career*
Years	Team	Apps	(Gls)
2015–2023	Al-Duhail	24	(0)
2015–2016	→ SPG FC Pasching/LASK Juniors (loan)	0	(0)
2016–2017	→ Eupen B (loan)	0	(0)
2018	→ Al-Markhiya (loan)	5	(0)
2018–2019	→ Al-Khor (loan)	17	(0)
2019	→ Al-Shahania (loan)	3	(0)
2023–	Al-Wakrah	12	(0)

International career^{‡}
2015–2016	Qatar U19	6	(0)
2014	Qatar U20	1	(0)
2017–	Qatar U23	9	(0)
2017–	Qatar	3	(0)
- * Club domestic league appearances and goals as of 17 January 2026 ‡ National team caps and goals as of 19:52, 30 December 2018 (UTC)

Mohammed Al-Bakri is a Qatari footballer who plays as a goalkeeper for Al-Wakrah, and the Qatar national team. He has also appeared for the Qatar U19, U20, and U23 teams.

== Career ==
Al Bakri was included in Qatar's squad for the 2019 AFC Asian Cup in the United Arab Emirates. Al Bakri has played in over 61 club matches.

== Career statistics ==
=== International ===
As of 24 March 2018

Qatar
Year	Apps	Goals
2017	1	0
2018	1	0
Total	2	0
