= 2016 Emir of Qatar Cup =

Tournament details
- Country: Qatar
- Dates: April – 20 May
- Teams: 18

Final positions
- Champions: Lekhwiya
- Runners-up: Al-Sadd

The 2016 Emir of Qatar Cup was the 44th edition of a men's football tournament in Qatar. It was played by the 1st and 2nd level divisions of the Qatari football league structure.

The competition featured all teams from the 2015–16 Qatar Stars League and the top four sides from the Qatargas League. Four venues were used – Al Sadd Stadium, Al Arabi Stadium, Qatar SC Stadium and Khalifa Stadium.

The cup winner was guaranteed a place in the 2017 AFC Champions League.

== Round One ==
Al Mu'aidar (P) 0-0 Al Shahaniya

Al Markhiya 1-3 Al Shamal

== Round Two ==
Al Kharitiyath 1-0 Qatar SC

Al Wakrah (P) 0-0 Al Shamal

Al Gharafa 1-0 Al Mu'aidar

Al Khor 2-1 Al Mesaimeer

== Round Three ==
Al Wakrah 1-2 Al Sailiya

Al Kharitiyath (P) 2-2 Al Arabi

Al Khor 2-3 Al Ahli

Al Gharafa (P) 1-1 Umm Salal

== Quarter-finals ==
Al Kharitiyath 0-3 Al Rayyan

Al Gharafa 2-3 Al Sadd

Al Sailiya 0-1 Lekhwiya

Al Ahli 2-4 El Jaish

== Semi-finals ==
Al Rayyan 2-3 Al Sadd

Lekhwiya 2-1 El Jaish

== Final ==
Al Sadd 2-2 Lekhwiya (aet, 2–4 pens)
