= Khalifa Ababacar =

Senegalese footballer (born 1989)

Khalifa Ababacar N'Diaye
Personal information
- Full name: Khalifa Ababacar N'Diaye
- Date of birth: 7 July 1989 (age 37)
- Place of birth: Senegal
- Height: 2.03 m (6 ft 8 in)
- Position: Goalkeeper

Team information
- Current team: Al-Gharafa
- Number: 1

Senior career*
Years	Team	Apps	(Gls)
2008–2017	Al Kharaitiyat	145	(0)
2015–2017	→ El Jaish (loan)	35	(0)
2017–2021	Al-Duhail	22	(0)
2018	→ Al-Khor (loan)	8	(0)
2019–2020	→ Al-Sailiya (loan)	17	(0)
2021–2023	Umm Salal	40	(0)
2023–	Al-Gharafa	51	(0)
- * Club domestic league appearances and goals as of 17 January 2026

Khalifa Ababacar N'Diaye (Arabic: خليفة أبوبكر; born 7 July 1989) is a Senegalese professional footballer who plays as a goalkeeper for Al-Gharafa.

== Personal life ==
He also has Qatari citizenship.
