= Ahmed Yasser (footballer, born 1994) =

Qatari footballer

Personal information
- Full name: Ahmed Yasser Elmohamady Abd Elrahman
- Date of birth: 17 May 1994 (age 32)
- Place of birth: Doha, Qatar
- Height: 1.81 m (5 ft 11 1/2 in)
- Position: Centre back

Youth career
- Aspire Academy

Senior career*
Years	Team	Apps	(Gls)
2011–2017	Lekhwiya	49	(0)
2017–2021	Al-Duhail	28	(3)
2017–2018	→ Cultural Leonesa (loan)	6	(1)
2018	→ Al-Rayyan (loan)	3	(0)
2018	→ Vissel Kobe (loan)	7	(0)
2021–2024	Al-Rayyan	12	(1)

International career^{‡}
2013–	Qatar	29	(0)
- * Club domestic league appearances and goals as of 25 December 2018 ‡ National team caps and goals as of 29 December 2017

Ahmed Yasser Elmohamady Abd Elrahman (Arabic: أحمد ياسر المحمدي) is a Qatari footballer who plays as a central defender.

== Personal ==
Ahmed was born in Doha to an Egyptian family. His father Yasser Elmohamady was a footballer in Egypt during the 1970s. He is the brother of fellow Qatar national team footballers Hussein Yasser and Mohammed Yasser.

== Club career ==
=== Lekhwiya ===
Born in Doha, Yasser attended the Aspire Academy in Qatar. In 2011 he joined Lekhwiya SC, and made his senior debut on 8 April of the following year by starting in a 1–1 Qatar Stars League home draw against Al Kharaitiyat SC.

Yasser started to feature more regularly in the following campaigns, being mainly used in the AFC Champions League. He made his debut in the competition on 1 May 2012, starting in a 3–0 away loss against Al-Ahli FC.

On 2 January 2014, while playing for Qatar in the 2014 WAFF Championship, Yasser was suspended by the Qatar Football Association for disciplinary problems. He was suspended from playing for his club until the end of the season, and his wages were held as well.

=== Cultural Leonesa ===
On 14 July 2017, Yasser moved to Segunda División side Cultural y Deportiva Leonesa. He made his debut on 10 September, starting in a 4–4 home draw against Real Valladolid.

Yasser scored his first goal abroad on 17 September 2017, netting the winner in a 3–2 home success over SD Huesca.

=== Vissel Kobe ===
Yasser was loaned out to J1 League club Vissel Kobe in August 2018.

== International career ==
On 26 March 2013 Yasser made his debut for Qatar, starting in a 2–1 away loss against South Korea. He also featured with the under-23s in the 2016 AFC U-23 Championship, scoring a goal against North Korea on 22 January; it was also his first senior goal.
