= Younis Mahmoud =

Iraqi footballer (born 1983)

- يُونُس مَحْمُود خَلَف
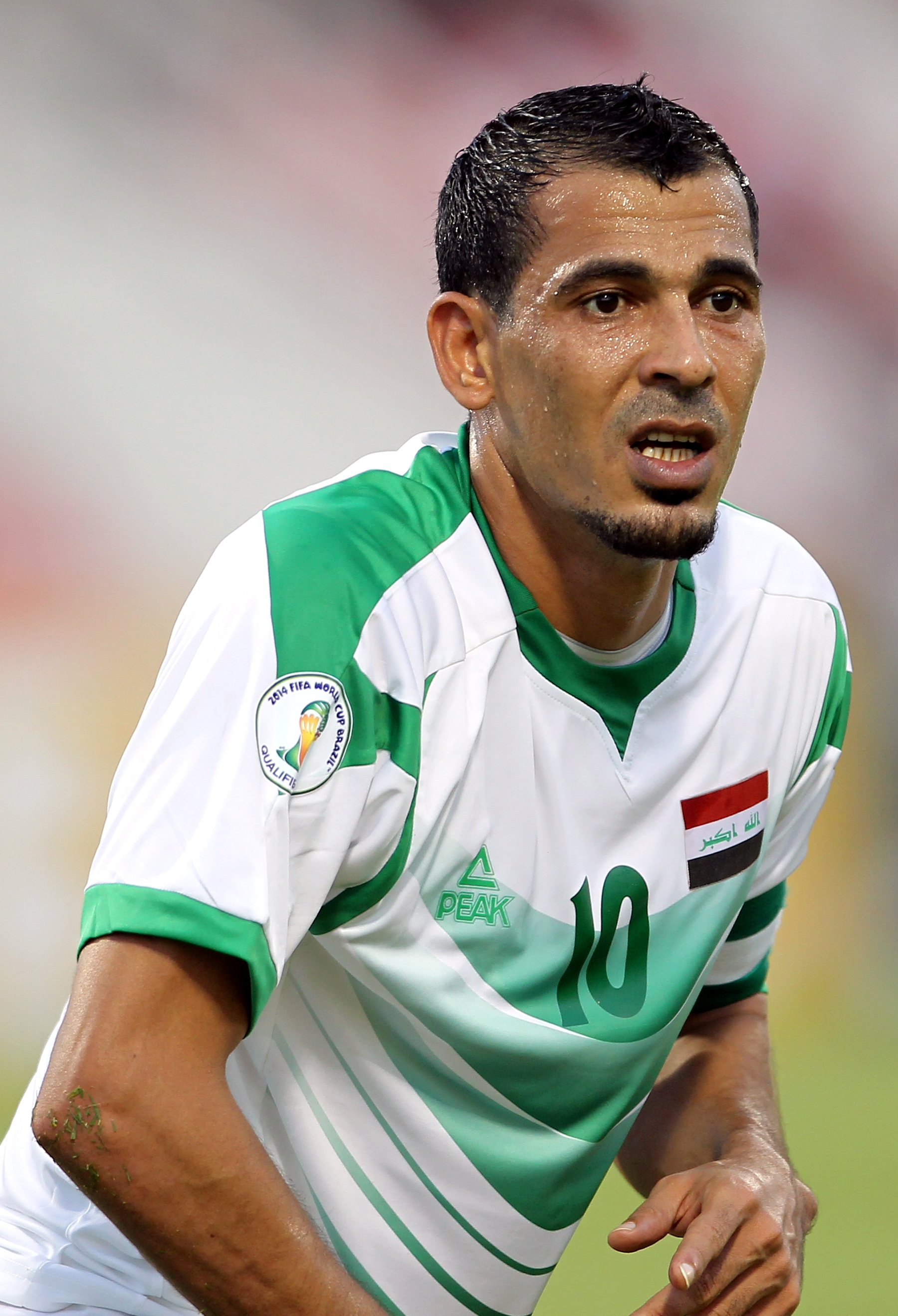
- Mahmoud with Iraq in 2012

President of Iraq Football Association
- Incumbent
- Assumed office 23 May 2026
- Preceded by: Adnan Dirjal

Personal details
- Born: Younis Mahmoud Khalaf; 3 February 1983 (age 43) Dibis, Kirkuk, Iraq
- Height: 1.85 m (6 ft 1 in)
- Occupation: Footballer; Football administrator
Association football career
- Position: Forward
Youth career
- 1997–1999: Kahrabaa Al-Dibis
Senior career*
Years	Team	Apps	(Gls)
1999–2001	Kirkuk		(24)
2001–2003	Al-Talaba		(26)
2003–2004	Al-Wahda		(0)
2004–2006	Al-Khor	49	(39)
2006–2011	Al-Gharafa	95	(72)
2008	→ Al-Arabi (loan)	6	(2)
2011–2013	Al-Wakrah	33	(16)
2013	Al-Sadd	7	(2)
2013	Al-Ahli	6	(3)
2015	Erbil	0	(0)
2015–2016	Al-Talaba	19	(3)
Total		–	(187)
International career
2001–2002	Iraq U19	8	(4)
2002–2004	Iraq U23	33	(21)
2014	Iraq Asian Games (OA)	6	(4)
2002–2016	Iraq	148	(57)
Medal record
Representing Iraq
Men's football
WAFF Championship
First place	2002 Damascus	Senior
West Asian Games
Gold medal – first place	2005 Doha	Senior
Asian Games
Silver medal – second place	2006 Doha	Olympic
Bronze medal – third place	2014 Incheon	Olympic
AFC Asian Cup
First place	2007 Indonesia, Malaysia, Thailand, Vietnam	Senior
Arabian Gulf Cup
Second place	2013 Bahrain	Senior
- * Club domestic league appearances and goals

Younis Mahmoud Khalaf (Arabic: يُونُس مَحْمُود خَلَف; born 3 February 1983) is an Iraqi former professional footballer who played as a forward for the Iraq national team and is currently the president of the Iraq Football Association. One of the country's greatest ever players, Mahmoud captained the team for ten consecutive years and became an icon of Asian football. He also played for a number of clubs in the Iraqi Premier League, the UAE Arabian Gulf League, the Qatar Stars League and the Saudi Pro League, and is the only foreign player to have won three top scorer awards in Qatar.

Mahmoud's first international goal was an equaliser in the 89th minute of the final of the 2002 WAFF Championship, which Iraq then went on to win in extra-time. Three years later, Mahmoud scored in the final of the 2005 West Asian Games to lead his team to another title, before becoming the national team captain a year later. In 2007, Mahmoud achieved the best honour of his career, leading his country to win the 2007 AFC Asian Cup, their first such success, scoring the winning goal in the final and also winning the Golden Boot and Most Valuable Player awards at the tournament. In the 2007 Ballon d'Or, Mahmoud finished in 29th place, becoming the only Iraqi player ever to be nominated for the Ballon d'Or.

Mahmoud played in all three of Iraq's 2009 FIFA Confederations Cup matches and scored in the final of the Arabian Gulf Cup in 2013, before retiring in 2016 as the most-capped player in Iraq's history and their third-highest goalscorer ever. He is also the only player in history to score in four different AFC Asian Cup tournaments, with one goal in 2004, four in 2007, one in 2011 and two in 2015.

== Club career ==
=== Early career ===
Mahmoud started out as a basketball player, playing as a shooting guard for the Kahrabaa Al-Dibis basketball team. The team's football coach, Muwafaq Nouraddin, persuaded him to switch to football as there was more money involved in football in Iraq, so Mahmoud joined Shaabiya Al-Dibis and then began playing for Kahrabaa Al-Dibis football team in the fourth division of Iraqi football. He became a regular player for the side.

=== Kirkuk ===
In 1999, Mahmoud moved to Kirkuk's biggest team, Kirkuk FC, and scored his first league goal for Kirkuk in Round 8 of the 1999–2000 Iraqi Premier League (then known as the Iraqi First Division League) in a 3–0 win over Al-Kadhimiya. He scored a penalty kick in Round 12 in a 6–1 loss against Al-Diwaniya and scored two goals in Round 13 in a 2–2 draw with Al-Ramadi. His fifth goal came in a 1–1 draw with Al-Naft in Round 35 (although the result was changed to a 3–0 defeat due to the fielding of an ineligible player), and he scored again in Round 39 in a 1–0 win over Al-Karkh. Kirkuk failed to qualify for the 2000–01 Iraqi Premier League (then known as the Iraqi Elite League) and therefore played in the second-tier, but they managed to get promoted back to the top division at the first time of asking by winning the league, with Mahmoud being the second-highest scorer of the second-tier with 19 goals. At Kirkuk, he was discovered by scouts of Baghdad-based teams Al-Shorta and Al-Talaba, two of Iraq's biggest clubs, and he went on trial with Al-Shorta only to be turned down by their manager Ahmed Radhi. After this, Mahmoud transferred to Al-Talaba.

=== Al-Talaba ===
Mahmoud's first match for Al-Talaba was the opening game of the 2001–02 Iraqi Elite League against his former club, Kirkuk. Al-Talaba won the match 8–0 and Mahmoud scored a hat-trick. Mahmoud won his first trophy with the club when Al-Talaba defeated Al-Zawraa 2–1 in the 2001 Baghdad Day Cup; Mahmoud scored Al-Talaba's second goal in the game. Al-Talaba's penultimate league game of the season was a 2–0 win over Al-Karkh, with Mahmoud scoring both of Al-Talaba's goals. This match secured Al-Talaba their fifth league title, as they won the league with 91 points; Mahmoud scored 13 goals in the league that season. Al-Talaba also won the Iraq FA Cup that season to secure the double. Mahmoud scored 6 goals in that competition and assisted the winning goal in the final. That season, Al-Talaba also reached the final of the 11th Umm al-Ma'arik Championship, but they lost the final 1–0 to Al-Shorta; Mahmoud scored 4 goals in that competition.

Mahmoud's Al-Talaba started the 2002–03 campaign by winning the 2002 Iraqi Perseverance Cup (now known as Iraqi Super Cup) 2–1 against Al-Quwa Al-Jawiya. The Iraqi Elite League was renamed 'Iraqi First Division League' for the 2002–03 season and Mahmoud scored 13 goals in the league that season before it was cancelled due to war. Al-Talaba won the Iraq FA Cup again and also lost the 12th Umm al-Ma'arik Championship final to Al-Shorta again. They also played in the 2002–03 AFC Champions League but were knocked out at the group stage; Mahmoud scored 2 goals in that tournament, both against Turkmen club Nisa Aşgabat.

While an Al-Talaba player, Mahmoud also represented the Iraq Police team in the 2002 Arab Police Championship, a competition for Police teams in the Arab world, along with the rest of the Iraq youth team players. Iraq Police won all 4 matches they played and they conceded only 1 goal in the tournament. They won the competition finishing 7 points ahead of the 2nd-placed team. It was the 5th time that Iraq won the Arab Police Championship in its history.

=== Al-Wahda ===
After the start of the Iraq War in 2003, football in Iraq was put on hold, so Mahmoud moved to Abu Dhabi club Al-Wahda in October. He scored in the 2004 AFC Champions League in a 3–0 win against Iraqi club Al-Quwa Al-Jawiya. A few months into his spell, he got into a verbal argument with the club's manager, Rinus Israël, who subsequently refused to play him in any matches from there on.

=== Al-Khor ===
After the 2004 AFC Asian Cup, Mahmoud joined Qatar Stars League club Al-Khor with his compatriots Haidar Jabar and Qusay Munir. In the 2004–05 Qatar Stars League, Al-Khor finished in 3rd place and Mahmoud scored 19 goals, the 3rd-highest amount in the league. He broke three records in one game in an 8–0 victory over Al-Shamal. Having scored 6 goals in the match, he became the only player to have scored two hat-tricks in a single league match. He also scored the fastest goal in a league match, taking 30 seconds to score after the game had started. Furthermore, he was the only player that season to score three goals in each half against two different goalkeepers. He assisted in the two other goals in the match. Al-Khor were knocked out of the 2005 Emir of Qatar Cup at the quarter-final stage, losing on penalties to Al-Sadd after a 2–2 draw in which Mahmoud scored. Al-Khor won the Qatar Crown Prince Cup though with Mahmoud scoring 4 goals in that competition including 2 goals in the final which Al-Khor won 2–1.

Al-Khor finished in a disappointing 7th position in the 2005–06 Qatar Stars League, but Mahmoud scored an impressive 20 league goals, the 2nd-highest amount in the league. They were again knocked out at the quarter-final stage of the Emir of Qatar Cup and Mahmoud scored 2 goals in that competition.

=== Al-Gharafa ===
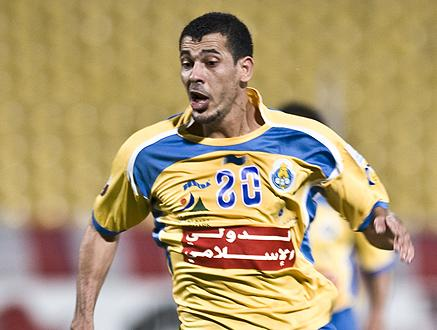
Younis Mahmoud playing for Al-Gharafa in 2009.

Mahmoud transferred to Al-Gharafa in 2006 and he would stay there for the next 5 years. Al-Gharafa finished as runners-up of the 2006–07 Qatar Stars League, and Mahmoud's 19 goals saw him take the Golden Boot award for the first time in his career. Al-Gharafa were runners-up of the Qatar Crown Prince Cup and Mahmoud scored 1 goal, in the semi-final. They were knocked out of the Emir of Qatar Cup in the semi-final, and Mahmoud scored 1 goal, in the quarter-final.

Mahmoud started the season by winning the 2007 Sheikh Jassim Cup and scoring 2 goals in the final, both in extra-time. Mahmoud won his first Qatar Stars League title in 2007–08 and scored 16 league goals, the 4th-highest amount in the league. Al-Gharafa lost the final of the Qatar Crown Prince Cup, with Mahmoud scoring 2 times in the semi-final. They also lost the final of the Emir of Qatar Cup, and Mahmoud scored 3 goals in that competition including 1 in the final. Al-Gharafa were knocked out of the group stage of the 2008 AFC Champions League and Mahmoud scored 1 goal in that competition.

==== Al-Arabi ====
Mahmoud joined Al-Arabi at the start of the 2008–09 season on loan and with them won the Sheikh Jassim Cup. He scored 2 league goals for Al-Arabi in the 2008–09 Qatar Stars League.

==== Return to Al-Gharafa ====
Mahmoud returned to Al-Gharafa midway through the season and scored 1 goal for them in the 2008–09 Qatar Stars League, when they again won the league championship. He played in the Qatar Crown Prince Cup but they lost the semi-final to Qatar SC. However, they won the 2009 Emir of Qatar Cup, Mahmoud scoring 3 goals.

With Al-Gharafa, Mahmoud won a third consecutive league title. He scored 21 goals which earned him the Golden Boot award again. He scored 4 goals in the 2009 Sheikh Jassim Cup, where Al-Gharafa were knocked out in the semi-finals, and 3 goals in the 2009 Qatari Stars Cup (including 2 in the final) which Al-Gharafa won. In the 2010 Qatar Crown Prince Cup Final, Mahmoud scored 2 goals to lead Al-Gharafa to yet another cup win. Al-Gharafa were knocked out of the 2010 Emir of Qatar Cup at the quarter-finals, and the 2010 AFC Champions League (in which Mahmoud scored 4 goals) at the quarter-finals too.

His campaign started off with the 2010 Sheikh Jassim Cup where Al-Gharafa were knocked out at the group stage; Mahmoud scored a hat-trick in a 5–0 win over Al-Markhiya in that competition. In the 2010–11 Qatar Stars League, Al-Gharafa finished in second place and Mahmoud won the Golden Boot award for the third time, with 15 league goals. Al-Gharafa were knocked out at the group stage of the 2010 Qatari Stars Cup, but they won the 2011 Qatar Crown Prince Cup and lost the final of the 2011 Emir of Qatar Cup (where Mahmoud scored 1 goal in the quarter-final). In the 2011 AFC Champions League, Al-Gharafa were knocked out at the group stage, where Mahmoud scored a hat-trick against Al-Jazira.

=== Al-Wakrah ===
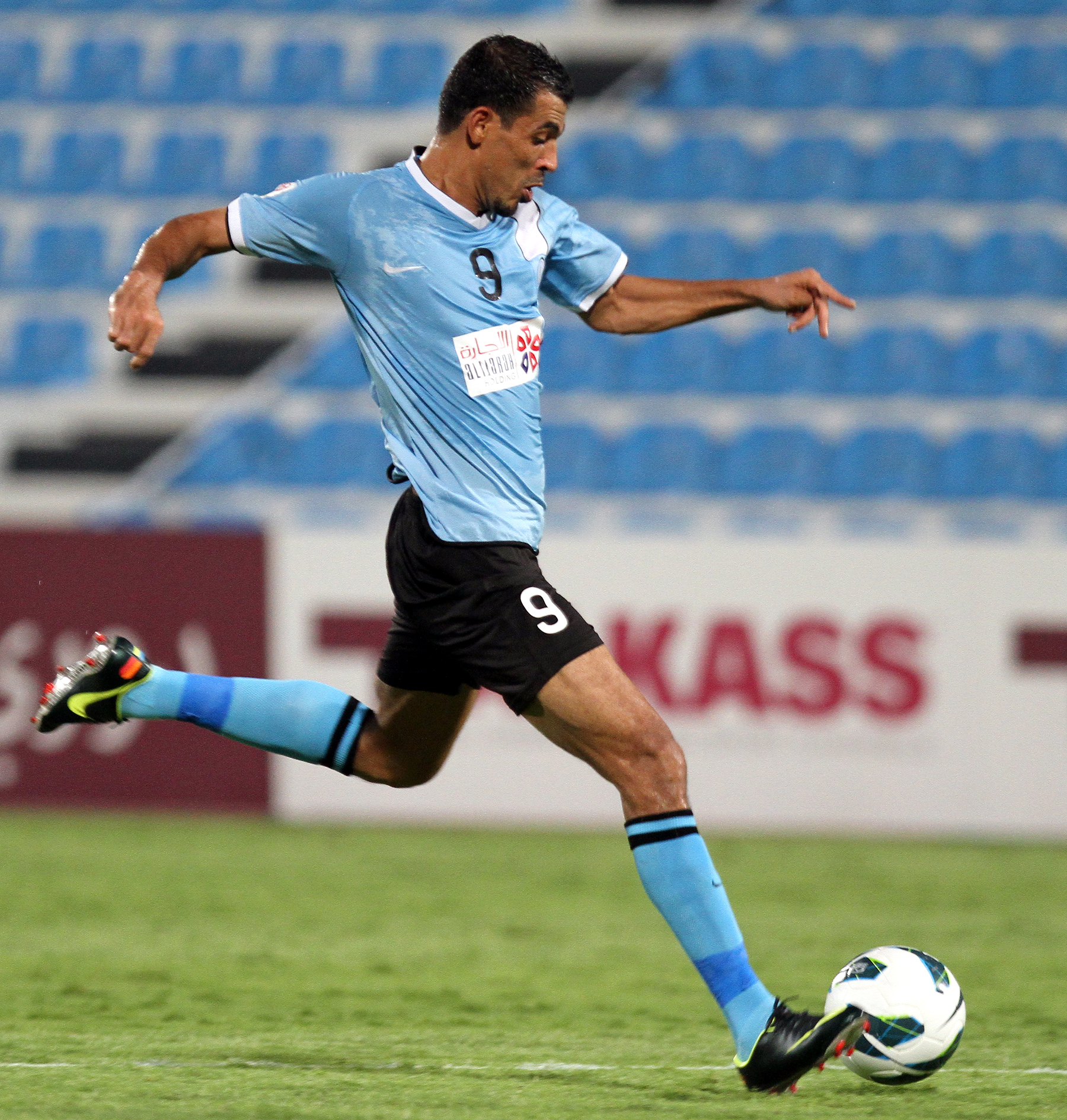
Younis Mahmoud playing for Al-Wakrah in 2012.

In 2011, Mahmoud signed for Al-Wakrah, who had finished in 7th place in the league the previous season. Al-Wakrah were knocked out of the 2011 Sheikh Jassim Cup at the group stage, and they finished in 7th place again in the 2011–12 Qatar Stars League; Mahmoud scored 8 goals in the league. Mahmoud earned his first honour with Al-Wakrah when they won the 2011 Qatari Stars Cup, with Mahmoud scoring 1 goal in the semi-final (and also missing a penalty). In the 2012 Emir of Qatar Cup, Al-Wakrah lost the quarter-final to Mahmoud's future club Al-Sadd.

Al-Wakrah were knocked out at the group stage of the Sheikh Jassim Cup again in 2012. Mahmoud scored 8 league goals for Al-Wakrah this season. They were knocked out at the group stage of the 2012–13 Qatari Stars Cup.

=== Al-Sadd ===
On 8 February 2013, days after Al-Wakrah were knocked out of the Qatari Stars Cup, Mahmoud signed for Al-Sadd, joining until the end of the 2012–13 season. He made his league debut on 11 February 2013, in Al-Sadd's 3–0 win over Al-Sailiya. Mahmoud scored 2 league goals for Al-Sadd in the 2012–13 season and Al-Sadd won the league as Mahmoud achieved his fourth Qatar Stars League title. Mahmoud equalled Nasser Kamile's record for goals in the Qatar Crown Prince Cup after scoring against Al-Rayyan in the semi-final on 26 April. He scored what would be his 10th goal, tying him with Kamile, who participated in the tournament since its inception in 1995. Mahmoud went on to score in the final of that competition too, but Al-Sadd lost the match 3–2 to Lekhwiya SC. Mahmoud also scored in the semi-final of the 2013 Emir of Qatar Cup, and Al-Sadd reached the final, only to lose it 2–1 against Al-Rayyan.

=== Al-Ahli ===
On 16 September 2013, Mahmoud signed for Saudi Professional League side Al-Ahli, signing a 4-month contract with the club. He made his league debut on 23 September 2013, in Al-Ahli's 5–1 win over Al-Nahda, scoring Al-Ahli's opening 2 goals. Just over a month later, he scored his 3rd (and final) goal for the club in a 5–2 victory over Al-Shoulla. Younis ended his contract 2 weeks before the official end of it.

=== Erbil ===
In February 2015, after the 2015 AFC Asian Cup, Mahmoud returned to Iraq to play for Erbil, but only in AFC Cup games, because he did not want to compete in the Iraqi Premier League against his former club Al-Talaba. On 15 April, he made his debut for the club against FC Ahal and scored 2 goals in the match (a header and a Panenka penalty), but could not prevent his side from being defeated 3–2 in the game. He was given the captain's armband for Erbil's next AFC Cup match against FC Istiklol, but the game finished goalless and Erbil crashed out of the tournament at the group stage.

=== Al-Talaba ===
On 12 September 2015, Mahmoud returned to play for his former club Al-Talaba. He was given the captain's armband and the number 9 shirt and he scored 3 goals in the 2015–16 Iraqi Premier League (against Al-Karkh, Al-Samawa and Naft Al-Wasat) as Al-Talaba finished the league in 3rd position (their highest league position for 6 years). At the end of the season, Mahmoud announced his retirement from football.

=== Ballon d'Or nomination ===
Younis Mahmoud is the only Iraqi player in history to have made the Ballon d'Or shortlist, when he finished 29th in 2007. In that year, he was the only outfield player who did not play in European clubs among players of the list, and was the only Asian player to get points. Kaká won the Ballon d'Or that year, while Mahmoud earned two points, finishing ahead of 21 world-renowned players including the likes of Samuel Eto'o, David Beckham and Robin van Persie.

== International career ==
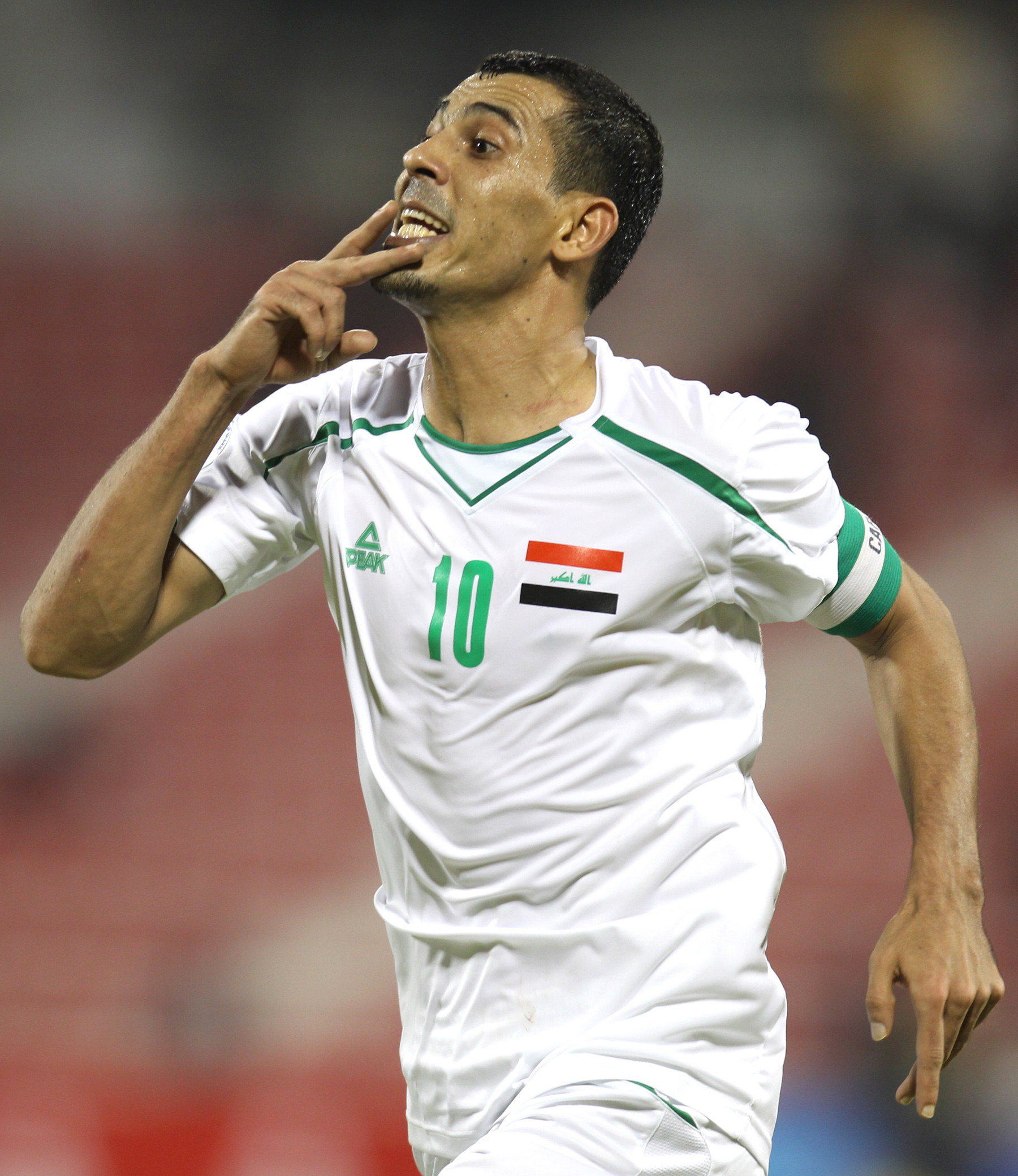
Younis Mahmoud after scoring a goal for Iraq in 2011.

In March 2002, while many were questioning his temperament and lack of experience, coach Adnan Hamad named Mahmoud in his squad for Iraq's training camp in Italy and gave him his first start against Serie B club Cagliari Calcio and he later went on to score. Mahmoud's full international debut was against Syria in a friendly in Baghdad on 19 July 2002. His 1st goal came in the final of the 2002 WAFF Championship in the 89th minute to take the game to extra-time, where Iraq won through Haidar Mahmoud's golden goal. In his next match for Iraq, a 2004 AFC Asian Cup qualifier, he scored 4 goals against Bahrain and then went on to score a hat-trick against Malaysia. He scored 6 goals for the Olympic team in the 2003 Prince Abdullah Al-Faisal Friendship Cup, including a hat-trick against Al-Nassr and the only goal in the final against Morocco, as Iraq won the cup. His achievements in 2003 saw him get nominated for the Asian Young Footballer of the Year.

He was part of Iraq's 2004 Olympic Games qualifying squad and scored goals against Oman and Kuwait as Iraq managed to qualify. Mahmoud scored 1 goal in the 2004 Asian Cup against Saudi Arabia, and in the Olympic Games finals, Iraq finished in 4th place and Mahmoud scored 1 goal, against Portugal. Iraq participated in the 2005 West Asian Games and Mahmoud scored 3 goals in the tournament, including a goal in the final which Iraq went on to win to claim the gold medal. In 2006, Iraq participated in the Asian Games and reached the final but lost to Qatar; Mahmoud scored 3 goals in the tournament. In 2006, Mahmoud became the Iraq captain, taking over from Razzaq Farhan.

2007 was one of the best years of Mahmoud's career; he scored 1 goal in the 2007 WAFF Championship where Iraq finished as runners-up, and he scored 4 goals in the 2007 AFC Asian Cup including the winning goal in the final as Iraq won their 1st ever Asian Cup. Mahmoud won the top scorer award and the MVP award in the tournament, and nominated for the 2007 Asian Footballer of the Year award and the 2007 Ballon d'Or, becoming the first Iraqi player in history to be nominated for the prestigious Ballon d'Or award. 2 years later, he won his final trophy for Iraq, the 2009 UAE International Cup, and that year he also participated in the 2009 FIFA Confederations Cup, playing all 3 of Iraq's games.

He scored in his 3rd consecutive Asian Cup tournament with a goal against Iran in the 2011 AFC Asian Cup. Mahmoud scored 7 goals in qualification for the 2014 FIFA World Cup but Iraq finished bottom of their group in the final round and failed to qualify. At the start of 2013, Iraq participated in the 21st Arabian Gulf Cup and Iraq finished as runners-up; Mahmoud scored 2 goals in the tournament including Iraq's only goal in the final: a 2–1 defeat to the United Arab Emirates after extra-time. Mahmoud led Iraq to qualify for the 2015 AFC Asian Cup by scoring 4 goals in the qualifying rounds including 2 goals in the decisive match against China. He participated as one of Iraq's overaged players in the 2014 Asian Games and he scored 4 goals in the tournament as Iraq won the bronze medal. In the 2015 Asian Cup, Iraq finished in 4th place and Mahmoud scored 2 goals (against Palestine and Iran which saw him become the only player to score in 4 consecutive Asian Cup tournaments). On 28 March 2015, Iraq played a friendly match against DR Congo and the match saw Mahmoud become Iraq's most-capped player of all time. Mahmoud continued to be a key player for Iraq during their 2018 FIFA World Cup qualifying campaign and he scored 4 goals in Iraq's group including a free-kick against Chinese Taipei to send Iraq to the final round. He announced his retirement from football on 23 August 2016. Overall, Mahmoud scored 57 goals in 148 international matches.

== Administrative career ==
On 23 May 2026, Mahmoud was elected president of the Iraq Football Association, having served as deputy to Adnan Dirjal since 2021.

== Controversy ==
In March 2004, Younis Mahmoud got into a scuffle with the Iraqi coaching staff led by German Bernd Stange. He was angry at the coach after being left on the bench until the 74th minute of the draw against Palestine at the 2006 FIFA World Cup qualification.

== Personal life ==
Younis Mahmoud is an Arab Sunni Muslim. He has married three times. His younger brother Omar Mahmoud is also a footballer.

== Career statistics ==
Appearances and goals by national team and year
National team	Year	Apps	Goals
Iraq	2002	5	1
Iraq	2003	6	7
Iraq	2004	12	2
Iraq	2005	5	4
Iraq	2006	10	8
Iraq	2007	15	5
Iraq	2008	11	0
Iraq	2009	11	2
Iraq	2010	8	2
Iraq	2011	17	6
Iraq	2012	9	5
Iraq	2013	14	6
Iraq	2014	7	3
Iraq	2015	15	6
Iraq	2016	3	0
Total		148	57

Scores and results list Iraq's goal tally first, score column indicates score after each Mahmoud goal.

List of international goals scored by Younis Mahmoud
No.	Date	Venue	Opponent	Score	Result	Competition
1	7 September 2002	Al Abbassiyyine Stadium, Damascus, Syria	Jordan	2–2	3–2	2002 WAFF Championship
2	8 October 2003	Bukit Jalil Stadium, Kuala Lumpur, Malaysia	Bahrain	1–0	5–1	2004 AFC Asian Cup qualification
3	8 October 2003	Bukit Jalil Stadium, Kuala Lumpur, Malaysia	Bahrain	3–0	5–1	2004 AFC Asian Cup qualification
4	8 October 2003	Bukit Jalil Stadium, Kuala Lumpur, Malaysia	Bahrain	4–0	5–1	2004 AFC Asian Cup qualification
5	8 October 2003	Bukit Jalil Stadium, Kuala Lumpur, Malaysia	Bahrain	5–1	5–1	2004 AFC Asian Cup qualification
6	20 October 2003	Bahrain National Stadium, Manama, Bahrain	Malaysia	2–0	5–1	2004 AFC Asian Cup qualification
7	20 October 2003	Bahrain National Stadium, Manama, Bahrain	Malaysia	3–0	5–1	2004 AFC Asian Cup qualification
8	20 October 2003	Bahrain National Stadium, Manama, Bahrain	Malaysia	4–1	5–1	2004 AFC Asian Cup qualification
9	26 July 2004	Sichuan Longquanyi Stadium, Chengdu, China	Saudi Arabia	2–1	2–1	2004 AFC Asian Cup
10	8 September 2004	Chungshan Soccer Stadium, Taipei, Taiwan	Chinese Taipei	4–1	4–1	2006 FIFA World Cup qualification
11	7 August 2005	Bahrain National Stadium, Manama, Bahrain	Bahrain	1–1	2–2	Friendly
12	5 December 2005	Jassim Bin Hamad Stadium, Doha, Qatar	Saudi Arabia	4–0	5–1	2005 West Asian Games
13	5 December 2005	Jassim Bin Hamad Stadium, Doha, Qatar	Saudi Arabia	5–1	5–1	2005 West Asian Games
14	10 December 2005	Jassim Bin Hamad Stadium, Doha, Qatar	Syria	2–1	2–2 (a.e.t.) (6–5 p)	2005 West Asian Games
15	15 July 2006	Al Abbassiyyine Stadium, Damascus, Syria	Syria	2–0	3–1	Friendly
16	15 July 2006	Al Abbassiyyine Stadium, Damascus, Syria	Syria	3–1	3–1	Friendly
17	21 July 2006	King Abdullah Stadium, Amman, Jordan	Jordan	1–2	1–2	Friendly
18	6 August 2006	King Abdullah Stadium, Amman, Jordan	Jordan	1–0	1–0	Friendly
19	17 August 2006	King Abdullah Stadium, Amman, Jordan	Palestine	1–0	3–0	2007 AFC Asian Cup qualification
20	17 August 2006	King Abdullah Stadium, Amman, Jordan	Palestine	2–0	3–0	2007 AFC Asian Cup qualification
21	11 October 2006	Khalifa Bin Zayed Stadium, Al Ain, United Arab Emirates	Singapore	1–1	4–2	2007 AFC Asian Cup qualification
22	11 October 2006	Khalifa Bin Zayed Stadium, Al Ain, United Arab Emirates	Singapore	3–2	4–2	2007 AFC Asian Cup qualification
23	22 June 2007	Amman International Stadium, Amman, Jordan	Syria	1–0	3–0	2007 WAFF Championship
24	7 July 2007	Rajamangala National Stadium, Bangkok, Thailand	Thailand	1–1	1–1	2007 AFC Asian Cup
25	21 July 2007	Rajamangala National Stadium, Bangkok, Thailand	Vietnam	1–0	2–0	2007 AFC Asian Cup
26	21 July 2007	Rajamangala National Stadium, Bangkok, Thailand	Vietnam	2–0	2–0	2007 AFC Asian Cup
27	29 July 2007	Bung Karno Stadium, Jakarta, Indonesia	Saudi Arabia	1–0	1–0	2007 AFC Asian Cup
28	4 January 2009	Sultan Qaboos Sports Complex, Muscat, Oman	Bahrain	1–2	1–3	19th Arabian Gulf Cup
29	10 July 2009	Franso Hariri Stadium, Erbil, Iraq	Palestine	2–0	3–0	Friendly
30	17 November 2010	Al-Nahyan Stadium, Abu Dhabi, United Arab Emirates	Kuwait	1–0	1–1	Friendly
31	28 December 2010	Prince Mohamed bin Fahd Stadium, Dammam, Saudi Arabia	Saudi Arabia	1–0	1–0	Friendly
32	2 January 2011	Grand Hamad Stadium, Doha, Qatar	China	1–1	2–3	Friendly
33	2 January 2011	Grand Hamad Stadium, Doha, Qatar	China	2–1	2–3	Friendly
34	11 January 2011	Ahmed bin Ali Stadium, Al Rayyan, Qatar	Iran	1–0	1–2	2011 AFC Asian Cup
35	6 September 2011	Jalan Besar Stadium, Kallang, Singapore	Singapore	2–0	2–0	2014 FIFA World Cup qualification
36	11 October 2011	Shenzhen Stadium, Shenzhen, China	China	1–0	1–0	2014 FIFA World Cup qualification
37	11 November 2011	Grand Hamad Stadium, Doha, Qatar	China	1–0	1–0	2014 FIFA World Cup qualification
38	29 February 2012	Grand Hamad Stadium, Doha, Qatar	Singapore	2–0	7–1	2014 FIFA World Cup qualification
39	29 February 2012	Grand Hamad Stadium, Doha, Qatar	Singapore	6–1	7–1	2014 FIFA World Cup qualification
40	29 February 2012	Grand Hamad Stadium, Doha, Qatar	Singapore	7–1	7–1	2014 FIFA World Cup qualification
41	12 June 2012	Grand Hamad Stadium, Doha, Qatar	Oman	1–1	1–1	2014 FIFA World Cup qualification
42	30 December 2012	Al-Nahyan Stadium, Abu Dhabi, United Arab Emirates	Tunisia	1–2	1–2	Friendly
43	15 January 2013	Bahrain National Stadium, Riffa, Bahrain	Bahrain	1–0	1–1 (a.e.t.) (4–2 p)	21st Arabian Gulf Cup
44	18 January 2013	Bahrain National Stadium, Riffa, Bahrain	United Arab Emirates	1–1	1–2	21st Arabian Gulf Cup
45	6 February 2013	Al-Rashid Stadium, Dubai, United Arab Emirates	Indonesia	1–0	1–0	2015 AFC Asian Cup qualification
46	26 March 2013	Al-Shaab Stadium, Baghdad, Iraq	Syria	1–0	2–1	Friendly
47	6 October 2013	Camille Chamoun Sports City Stadium, Beirut, Lebanon	Yemen	3–1	3–2	Friendly
48	11 November 2013	Prince Mohamed bin Fahd Stadium, Dammam, Saudi Arabia	Saudi Arabia	1–1	1–2	2015 AFC Asian Cup qualification
49	5 March 2014	Sharjah Stadium, Sharjah, United Arab Emirates	China	1–0	3–1	2015 AFC Asian Cup qualification
50	5 March 2014	Sharjah Stadium, Sharjah, United Arab Emirates	China	2–0	3–1	2015 AFC Asian Cup qualification
51	22 December 2014	Sharjah Stadium, Sharjah, United Arab Emirates	Kuwait	1–1	1–1	Friendly
52	20 January 2015	Canberra Stadium, Canberra, Australia	Palestine	1–0	2–0	2015 AFC Asian Cup
53	23 January 2015	Canberra Stadium, Canberra, Australia	Iran	2–1	3–3 (a.e.t.) (7–6 p)	2015 AFC Asian Cup
54	3 September 2015	Shahid Dastgerdi Stadium, Tehran, Iran	Chinese Taipei	4–1	5–1	2018 FIFA World Cup qualification
55	8 September 2015	Rajamangala National Stadium, Bangkok, Thailand	Thailand	2–0	2–2	2018 FIFA World Cup qualification
56	8 October 2015	Mỹ Đình National Stadium, Hanoi, Vietnam	Vietnam	1–1	1–1	2018 FIFA World Cup qualification
57	17 November 2015	National Stadium, Kaohsiung, Taiwan	Chinese Taipei	2–0	2–0	2018 FIFA World Cup qualification

== Honours ==
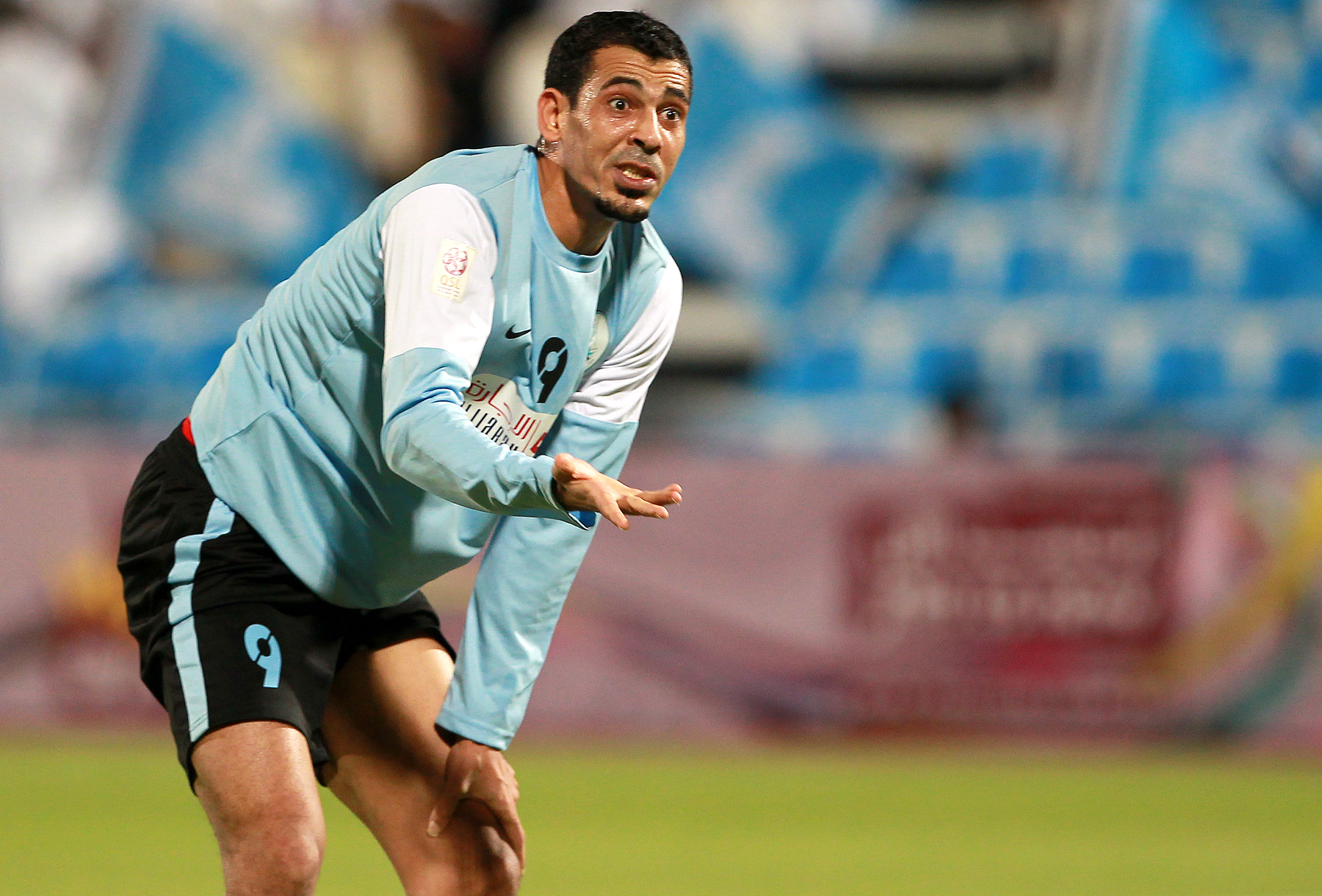
Younis Mahmoud playing for Al-Wakrah in 2011.

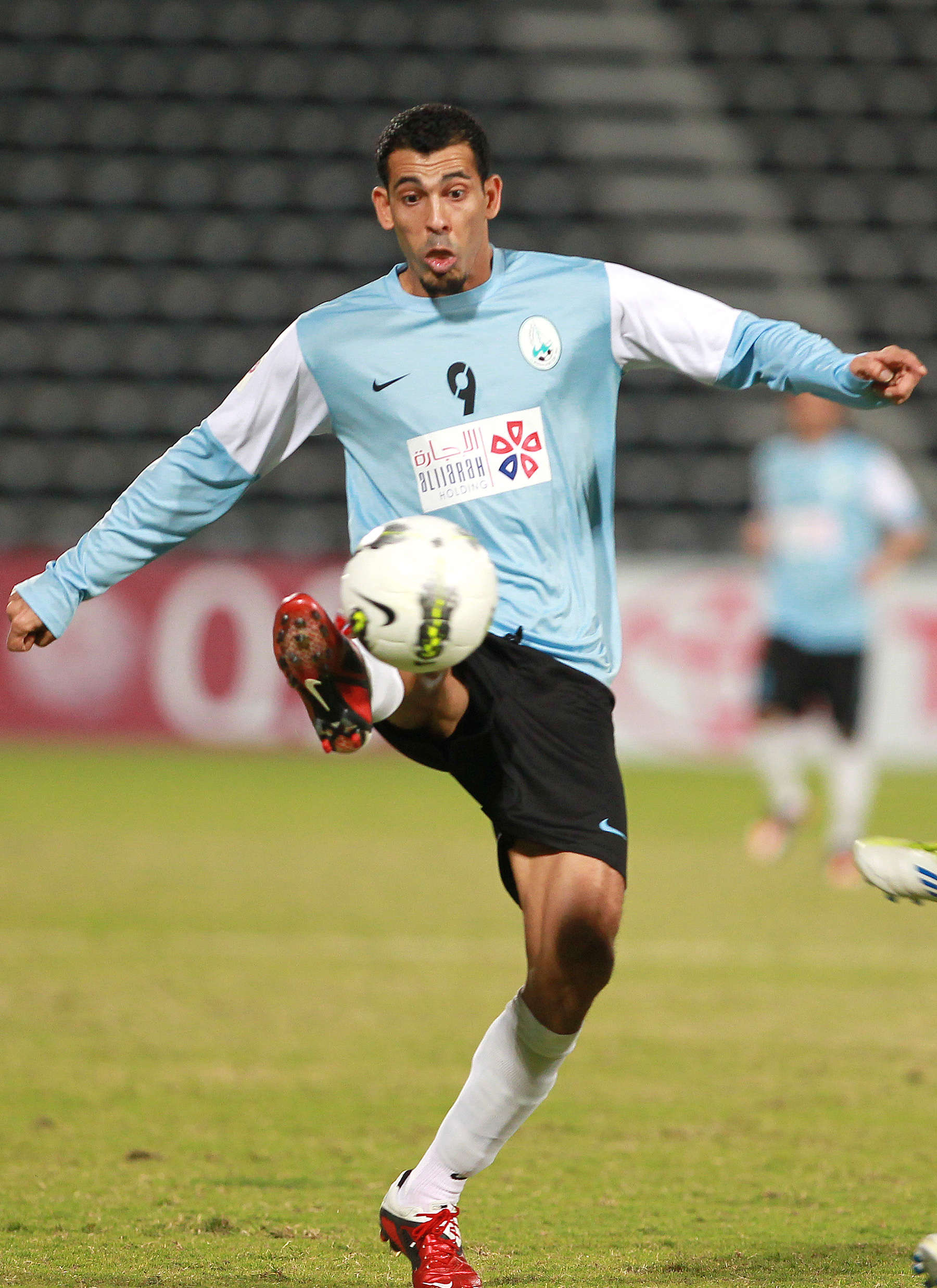
Younis Mahmoud playing for Al-Wakrah in 2011.

Kirkuk

- Iraqi First Division League: 2000–01

Al-Talaba

- Iraqi Premier League: 2001–02
- Iraq FA Cup: 2001–02, 2002–03
- Iraqi Super Cup: 2002

Al-Khor

- Qatar Crown Prince Cup: 2005

Al-Gharafa

- Qatar Stars League: 2007–08, 2008–09, 2009–10
- Emir of Qatar Cup: 2009
- Qatar Crown Prince Cup: 2010, 2011
- Sheikh Jassim Cup: 2007
- Qatari Stars Cup: 2009

Al-Arabi

- Sheikh Jassim Cup: 2008

Al-Wakrah

- Qatari Stars Cup: 2011–12

Al-Sadd

- Qatar Stars League: 2012–13

Iraq

- WAFF Championship: 2002
- West Asian Games: 2005
- AFC Asian Cup: 2007

Individual

- Qatar Stars League top scorer: 2006–07, 2009–10, 2010–11
- AFC Asian Cup most valuable player: 2007
- AFC Asian Cup top scorer: 2007 (shared)
- Asian Footballer of the Year nominee (2nd place): 2007
- Ballon d'Or nominee (29th place): 2007
- Premio internazionale Giacinto Facchetti: 2007
- Soccer Iraq Team of the Decade: 2010–2019

== See also ==
- List of men's footballers with 100 or more international caps
- List of men's footballers with 50 or more international goals

Sporting positions
Preceded by Razzaq Farhan	Iraq captain 2006–2016	Succeeded by Alaa Abdul-Zahra
