= Nashat Akram =

Iraqi footballer (born 1984)

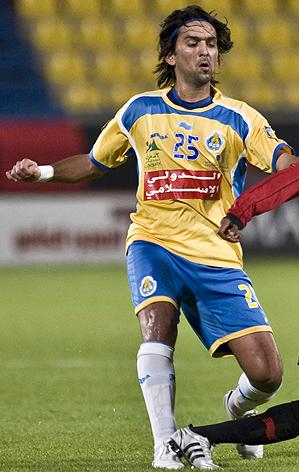
- Akram with Al-Gharafa in 2008

Personal information
- Full name: Nashat Akram Abid Ali Al-Eissa
- Date of birth: 12 September 1984 (age 42)
- Place of birth: Al Hillah, Babylon, Iraq
- Height: 1.86 m (6 ft 1 in)
- Position: Midfielder

Youth career
- 1993–1997: Al-Quwa Al-Jawiya
- 1997–1998: Al-Zawraa
- 1998–1999: Al-Quwa Al-Jawiya

Senior career*
Years	Team	Apps	(Gls)
1999–2000	Salahaddin		(0)
2000–2003	Al-Shorta		(7)
2001	→ Al-Zawraa (loan)	0	(0)
2003–2004	Al-Nassr		(1)
2004–2007	Al-Shabab		(8)
2007–2008	Al-Ain		(3)
2008–2009	Al-Gharafa	23	(7)
2009–2010	Twente	10	(0)
2010–2011	Al-Wakrah	11	(5)
2011–2012	Lekhwiya	8	(1)
2012	Al-Wakrah	11	(2)
2012–2013	Al-Nasr	11	(3)
2013–2014	Al-Shorta	21	(7)
2014	Dalian Aerbin	3	(0)
2014	Al-Shorta	2	(0)
2015	Erbil	0	(0)
Total		–	(44)

International career
2000	Iraq U17	3	(1)
2000–2001	Iraq U20	11	(0)
2001–2013	Iraq	113	(17)
Medal record
Men's football
Representing Iraq
AFC Asian Cup
Winner	2007 Indonesia/Malaysia/ Thailand/Vietnam
- * Club domestic league appearances and goals as of 10 April 2015

Nashat Akram Abid Ali Al-Eissa (Arabic: نَشَأَت أَكْرَم عَبْد عَلِيّ الْعِيسَى; born 12 September 1984) is an Iraqi former professional footballer. Popularly dubbed "The Maestro", he usually played as a playmaker or as an attacking midfielder and was known for his exceptional vision and excellent passing ability, as well as his ability to score goals from long range.

Akram was Iraq's most promising young prospect in the early 2000s, and became an integral part of the Iraq national team as he helped them win the 2007 AFC Asian Cup, winning the man of the match award in the final and being voted for the Team of the Tournament as well as finishing in third place in the AFC Footballer of the Year award in 2007. At Iraqi club level, he won the Iraqi Premier League title and three Baghdad Championship titles with Al-Shorta.

He also won league titles with Saudi club Al-Shabab, Qatari club Al-Gharafa and Dutch club FC Twente. Akram almost signed for Premier League club Manchester City in 2008, but work permit issues meant that he was not allowed to join, while he was also linked with clubs such as Sunderland and Málaga in his career.

== Biography ==
Nashat Akram first achieved prominence on Iraq's U-17s managed by Ammo Baba, who finished second in their Asian Cup qualifying group. He was later called into the Iraq U-19s by Adnan Hamad. Against Pakistan, he was instrumental in the 6–0 victory, setting 2 goals in 6 minutes, the 2nd Nashat was involved in the beginning of a move on the Iraqi left, then he reappeared on the right-hand edge of the penalty area to put Emad Mohammed through with a back heel that took three defenders out of the play, leaving Emad free to score. He was a regular until he was replaced at half time against Korea Republic due to a tactical change, he later made appearances late on in games and created openings with his inspirational play. In the final Nashat's long ball forward caused confusion between Shohei Ikeda and his goalkeeper, which resulted in a weak clearing header by Fujigaya. The ball fell to Emad who hooked the ball over both players to score the winner.

Prior to this, Akram played in the Iraq during its win of the AFC Youth Championship 2000. That same year, the 17-year-old made it into the first team of Iraqi giants Al-Shorta.

Akram went on to be involved in Iraq's qualification for both the Asian Cup 2004 and the Olympic Football Tournament Athens 2004.

== Club career ==
=== Salahaddin ===
Nashat Akram started his senior career at Salahaddin FC and made his debut in the 1999–2000 season under the coach Ammo Baba. He scored his first goal for Salahaddin in a 6–1 win over Al-Samawa in the 1999–2000 Iraq FA Cup on 3 January 2000.

=== Al-Shorta ===
In 2000, aged 16, Nashat Akram transferred to Al-Shorta and made it into their first team, and from the first sight the analysts believed that Iraq would produce one of the most promising players in Asia. In 2001, he was loaned out to Al-Zawraa for their matches in the Asian Club Championship. In 2002, he became a regular starter with his team leading them to win the Umm al-Ma'arik Championship (later known as the Baghdad Championship) and reaching the Iraq FA Cup final; unfortunately for the young star, they finished 2nd. After his great performance with Al-Shorta, Nashat Akram was called up to the Iraq Youth Team and later nominated for Asian Young Footballer of the Year. Nashat's Al Shorta finished third on 2 of the 3 season he spent at the club, and were leading the league in his final season before it was cancelled due to war.

=== Al-Nassr ===
In 2003, he signed for Al-Nassr after their newly appointed coach Yugoslav Ljubiša Tumbaković was in awe of Nashat's performance in the Emir Faisal Abdullah Friendship Cup in Abha in the 5–1 demolition of his side. Nashat has since seen three of his coaches at Al-Nassr replaced, Ljubiša Tumbaković, the Romanian Mircea Rednic, and the Egyptian Mohsen Saleh after less than a year at the club. He left the Saudi club due to wranglings over unpaid wages owed to him. Al Nassr finished 7th (out of 12) in his only season with the club.

=== Al-Shabab ===
In 2004, Nashat signed with the giant club Al-Shabab; in his first season, the team won the Saudi Premier League, and won the title again in 2006, where Akram also won the league's Player of the Year and Foreign Player of the Year awards.

=== Al-Ain and moving to England controversy ===
On 1 August 2007, Nashat Akram signed a 1-year contract with the club Al-Ain from UAE for 1 million dollars, he was also linked to England with Sunderland. During the current transfer window (January 2008), Akram agreed a deal to sign for Sven-Göran Eriksson's Manchester City side following a successful trial spell. Described by the Swede as an "elegant footballer," Akram was however refused the necessary work permit due to Iraq's FIFA ranking being outside the world's top 70 at the time. After his unsuccessful transfer move, Nashat returned to Al Ain and the team finished 6th (out of 12) in the league that season. Following that season he signed for Al-Gharafa on a free transfer.

=== Al-Gharafa ===
In April 2008, Nashat signed with the Qatari League champions Al-Gharafa for one season. He made his debut on 27. April against Al-Arabi Sports Club in the Qatar Crown Prince Cup. They won 4:3 and Nashat assisted two goals. He completed his achievement with Al-Gharafa when he won the Qatari League 2008–09 and 2009 Emir of Qatar Cup. Nashat scored 10 goals with Al-Gharafa.

=== Nashat Akram vs. Real Madrid ===
On 15 May 2008, although Nashat Akram signed for Al-Gharafa, Akram has received an invitation from Al-Nassr of Saudi Arabia to participate in a testimonial honoring club legend Majed Abdullah on 20 May against the Stars of Real Madrid CF. On 20 May 2008, Nashat Akram played with Al-Nassr against Real Madrid for 75 minutes, in the 53rd minute Nashat Akram assisted the first goal and scored the 2nd goal in the 55th minute. The match finished 4–1 for Al-Nassr.

=== FC Twente ===
On 19 May 2009, the Iraqi international midfielder signed a three-year contract with FC Twente in the Netherlands, he comes on a free transfer until 2012 and previously played for Qatari club Al-Gharafa. FC Twente won the Dutch league in 2009/10.

On 10 June 2010, Nashat was released and canceled his two-year contract remaining with Dutch champions FC Twente after having many difficulties with the club, such as an injury keeping him off the pitch for more than 8 weeks.

=== Al-Wakrah ===
In November 2010, Akram signed with Al-Wakrah on a free transfer for the remainder of the season. Al Wakrah finished 7th in the league (out of 12 teams). They were eliminated in the Quarter Final by Lekhwiya in the 2011 Emir of Qatar Cup. He Left Al Wakrah at the end of the season to sign for Qatari champions Lekhwiya

=== Lekhwiya ===
In July 2011, Akram signed with Lekhwiya, the league title holder in the Qatar Stars League. He had some problems which he later released him from his contract during the winter transfer window.

=== Al-Wakrah ===
On 3 January 2012, shortly after being released by Lekhwiya, Nashat signed with his former club Al-Wakrah. He joined alongside national teammates Younis Mahmoud, Alaa Abdul-Zahra, and Ali Rehema. where he added the Qatari Stars Cup to his trophy tally after winning it in March, where he scored an 85th-minute winner against his former club Lekhwiya in the Semi Final. Al Wakrah once again finished 7th in the league with Nashat Akram.

=== Al-Nasr ===
At the beginning of the season, Nashat signed with Al-Nasr Dubai. On 24 September 2012 he won his first league game started in the UAE Pro-League against Al Jazira. On 29 September Nashat scored his first goal for the club in the UAE Pro-League against Al Wasl in a 2–2 draw, next fixture after that on 5 October Nashat scored in 4–2 win against Al Shabab then after that Al-Nasr won 6–1 against Ittihad Kalba with Nashat Akram on the score sheet. Nashat left the club in February to return to his home country of Iraq.

=== Al-Shorta ===
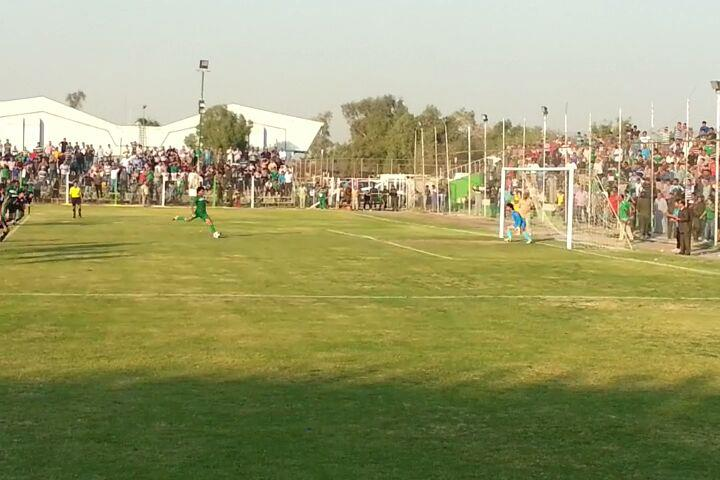
Nashat Akram taking a penalty for Al-Shorta in 2013.

On 17 February 2013, Nashat signed a contract with his former club Al Shorta after 10 years abroad. He said that he wished to fulfill the dreams of Al Shorta's fans and win the Iraqi Premier League. He was given the number 15 shirt, formerly worn by Abbas Rehema who had just left to join Al-Talaba. Nashat scored on his first start for Al Shorta with a free-kick in a comfortable 3–0 win against Al-Sinaa. He went on to score against Al-Najaf FC, Erbil SC, Zakho FC, Karbalaa FC and in the Baghdad Derby against Al-Zawraa in his return season, captaining his side to their third Iraqi Premier League title. He also gave the captain's armband to Amjad Kalaf in the last match of the season to allow him to be the first man to lift the trophy for Al Shorta. The Maestro, as he is called by the Al Shorta supporters, continued to be a key player for the team as his side started the 2013–14 in an attempt to defend their title, scoring a goal against Al-Karkh SC before leaving the club.

=== Dalian Aerbin ===
On 11 February 2014, Nashat free transferred from Al-Shorta to the Chinese Super League, signing a 2-years contract with Dalian Aerbin. He made his debut with this team on 22 March against Henan Jianye in the Chinese Super League, playing the first half and being substituted in the 53 minute for Sun Bo. His debut match ended in a 2–2 draw between the two teams. Nashat played three matches with this team and then he stopped due to injury. Because of injuries and Nashat failing to adjust to the lifestyle in China, he terminated his contract, but the matter was acrimonious and resulted in a case before the Court of Arbitration for Sport (CAS 2015/A/4039) which he lost. He was ordered to pay compensation of $690,000 to the Chinese club, of which $560,000 was borne by the player in the form of unpaid wages, and the rest was paid by Al-Shorta.

=== Al-Shorta ===
On 17 August 2014, Nashat re-signed for Al-Shorta after his unsuccessful spell in China. The news of his arrival at the club excited supporters who hoped that he could replicate the form he showed in the 2012–13 season and help the club to win the league title again. However, after just two games at the club, Nashat left the club after a vote of no confidence was passed against the club's president Ayad Bunyan (Nashat's father-in-law). He became a free agent and said that he would only play for Al-Shorta if Ayad Bunyan was the president.

=== Erbil ===
In February 2015, Nashat signed a contract with Erbil SC, but only to play AFC Cup matches. He made his debut against FC Istiklol, coming on as a substitute in the 72nd minute and assisting Erbil's final goal in a 3–1 victory. He made another substitute appearance against Qadsia SC, coming on in the 71st minute of a 1–0 loss. He made his final appearance for the club in a 2–1 defeat to Ahal FK, starting the match before getting subbed off on 73 minutes while the scores were still levelled at 1–1.

Nashat announced his retirement in April 2015 after becoming a father.

== International career ==
=== Youth team ===
Nashat Akram made his name as the star player in Iraq's U-17s managed by Ammo Baba, who finished 2nd in their Asian Cup qualifiers group in July 2000. He was later called up by Adnan Hamad into the Iraq Under-19s. He was instrumental in the 6–0 demolition of Pakistan, setting up 2 goals in 6 minutes. He was a regular until he was replaced at half time against Korea Republic due to a tactical change; he later made appearances late on in games and created openings with his inspirational play. In part due to his efforts, Iraq won the AFC Youth Championship 2000 and qualified to the 2001 FIFA World Youth Championship in Argentina. Later he was nominated the Asian Young Footballer of the Year.

=== Iraq national team ===
He made his international debut for the Iraq national team on 5 October 2001 in a World Cup qualification match against Saudi Arabia in Amman at the age of only 17 years and 23 days. On 15 June 2008 Nashat Akram scored a goal against China in China, to make an important 2–1 win for Iraq and gave a hope for qualifying to the next stage.

In the Asian World cup 2014 qualifiers, he provided a crucial assist to Younis Mahmoud against China. In the following game, he scored a double in Iraq's 3–1 victory over Jordan to allow Iraq to advance to the final round of qualifying, and he also scored a penalty in Iraq's 7–1 triumph over Singapore helping his country to seal the top spot in the group. He scored again, in Iraq's opening match in the final round of qualifying against Jordan, though the match ended in a 1–1 stalemate, and went on to feature against Oman, Japan (albeit as a substitute), and Australia. Before the match against Australia, he was part of Iraq's starting XI in their friendly match against Brazil.

=== Iraqi Olympic team ===
After the 2003 war, even though he was one of the youngest players in the squad, he was named the Iraqi Olympic team captain by Adnan Hamad and impressed during the Emir Faisal Abdullah Friendship Cup in Abha, In 2004 Nashat Akram helped his team to qualify to the 2004 Olympic Games and he was part of the team in the finals, Iraq Olympic team reached the 4th place losing to Italy 0–1

=== The 2007 Asian Cup ===
Nashat Akram was a major factor in the team, his great vision and mentality helped the team to win the 2007 Asian Cup; Nashat Akram was part of almost all Iraq's goals in the Asian Cup. He scored the opening goal against the 3–1 victory over Australia in the 23rd minute, and also made the assist for the 2nd goal by Hawar, and was part of the third goal. Nashat Akram won the Most Valuable Player award in 2 matches, the first against Australia and the second against Saudi Arabia in the final. In 2007 Nashat Akram was Asian Footballer of the Year 3rd place.

=== International goals ===
Scores and results list Iraq's goal tally first.

Nashat Akram – goals for Iraq
#	Date	Venue	Opponent	Score	Result	Competition
1.	26 July 2004	Sichuan Longquanyi Stadium, Chengdu	Saudi Arabia	1–0	2–1	2004 AFC Asian Cup
2.	16 November 2004	Al-Gharafa Stadium, Doha	Palestine	4–0	4–1	2006 World Cup qualifier
3.	3 December 2004	Al-Maktoum Stadium, Dubai	Yemen	1–0	3–1	Friendly
4.	13 December 2004	Jassim Bin Hamad Stadium, Doha	Qatar	2–2	3–3	17th Arabian Gulf Cup
5.	5 December 2005	Ahmed Bin Ali Stadium, Doha	Saudi Arabia	3–0	5–1	2005 West Asian Games
6.	13 July 2007	Rajamangala National Stadium, Bangkok	Australia	1–0	3–1	2007 AFC Asian Cup
7.	22 October 2007	Punjab Stadium, Lahore	Pakistan	1–0	7–0	2010 World Cup qualifier
8.	25 May 2008	Rajamangala National Stadium, Bangkok	Thailand	1–2	1–2	Friendly
9.	15 June 2008	Tianjin Olympic Center Stadium, Tianjin	China	1–0	2–1	2010 World Cup qualifier
10.	16 September 2010	Amman International Stadium, Amman	Jordan	1–2	1–4	Friendly
11.	21 September 2010	As-Salt Field, Salt	Oman	2–1	3–2	Friendly
12.	29 September 2010	King Abdullah Stadium, Amman	Palestine	3–0	3–0	2010 WAFF Championship
13.	15 November 2011	Amman International Stadium, Amman	Jordan	1–1	3–1	2014 World Cup qualifier
14.	15 November 2011	Amman International Stadium, Amman	Jordan	3–1	3–1	2014 World Cup qualifier
15.	29 February 2012	Grand Hamad Stadium, Doha	Singapore	4–1	7–1	2014 World Cup qualifier
16.	23 May 2012	Atatürk Olympic Stadium, Istanbul	Sierra Leone	1–0	1–0	Friendly
17.	3 June 2012	Amman International Stadium, Amman	Jordan	1–0	1–1	2014 World Cup qualifier

== Honours ==
Al-Shorta

- Iraqi Premier League: 2012–13
- Baghdad Championship: 2000–01, 2001–02, 2002–03

Al-Shabab

- Saudi Professional League: 2005–06

Al-Gharafa

- Qatar Stars League: 2008–09
- Emir of Qatar Cup: 2009

Twente

- Eredivisie: 2009–10

Al-Wakrah

- Qatari Stars Cup: 2011–12

Iraq

- AFC U-19 Championship: 2000
- WAFF Championship: 2002
- West Asian Games: 2005
- AFC Asian Cup: 2007

Individual

- Best Foreign Player in the 2005–06 Saudi Premier League
- Most Valuable Player of the 2007 AFC Asian Cup Final
- Selected for the 2007 AFC Asian Cup All-Star XI
- Finished third place in the 2007 Asian Footballer of the Year award
- Asian Player of the Year at the 2009 International Football Awards
- Soccer Iraq Team of the Decade: 2010–2019

== Personal life ==
Nashats parents are from Babylon Governorate. Nashat is the second child after his oldest brother Haider Akram and before his youngest brother Hassan Akram. In the year 2009, Hassan was kidnapped by a terrorist group in Iraq but was freed by the Iraqi police. Nashat is married with Hawra Al-Nadawi, an Iraqi writer living in London and they have two children. His father died when he was a little child.

== See also ==
- List of men's footballers with 100 or more international caps

Awards
Preceded by (Kuwait) Bader Al-Mutwa	2nd Runner-up AFC player of the Year; 2007	Succeeded by (Qatar) Sebastian Soria
