= 2013–14 QNB Cup =

Tournament details
- Country: Qatar
- Dates: 8 October 2013 – 15 March 2014
- Teams: 14

Final positions
- Champions: Qatar SC
- Runners-up: Al-Sadd SC

Tournament statistics
- Matches played: 55
- Goals scored: 118 (2.15 per match)
- Top goal scorer: Mahir Yousef

The 2013–14 QNB Cup was the 5th edition of the league cup competition in Qatar.

It featured 14 teams from the Qatar Stars League divided into three groups, with the winner and best runner-up advancing to the semi-finals. It is known as the QNB cup due to sponsorship by the QNB Group.

== Round One Groups ==
Group A	Group B	Group C
Al Sadd SC; Al-Rayyan SC; Al-Arabi SC; Muaither SC; Al-Khor SC	El Jaish SC; Al-Ahli SC; Al-Kharaitiyat SC; Al-Gharafa SC; Al-Wakrah SC	Umm Salal SC; Qatar SC; Al-Duhail SC; Al-Sailiya SC

=== Standings ===
==== Group A ====
Pos	Team	Pld	W	D	L	GF	GA	GD	Pts
1	Al Sadd SC	4	3	0	1	13	6	+7	9
2	Al-Rayyan SC	4	2	1	1	7	5	+2	7
3	Al-Arabi SC	4	2	0	2	11	11	0	6
4	Muaither SC	4	1	1	2	7	8	−1	4
5	Al-Khor SC	4	1	0	3	3	11	−8	3

Source: soccerway.com
Rules for classification: 1) points; 2) goal difference; 3) number of goals scored.

===== Results =====
Date	Team 1	Score	Team 2
2013/10/08	Al-Rayyan SC	2–2	Muaither SC
2013/10/08	Al-Khor SC	1–6	Al-Arabi SC
2013/10/12	Al Sadd SC	2–1	Muaither SC
2013/10/12	Al-Rayyan SC	0–1	Al-Khor SC
2013/11/12	Al Sadd SC	6–1	Al-Arabi SC
2013/11/12	Muaither SC	2–0	Al-Khor SC
2013/11/17	Al Sadd SC	3–1	Al-Khor SC
2013/11/17	Al-Arabi SC	0–2	Al-Rayyan SC
2013/12/21	Al-Arabi SC	4–2	Muaither SC
2013/12/21	Al Sadd SC	2–3	Al-Rayyan SC

==== Group B ====
Pos	Team	Pld	W	D	L	GF	GA	GD	Pts
1	El Jaish SC	4	3	1	0	11	2	+9	10
2	Al-Ahli SC	4	2	2	0	6	4	+2	8
3	Al-Kharaitiyat SC	4	1	1	2	4	6	−2	4
4	Al-Gharafa SC	4	0	2	2	3	7	−4	2
5	Al-Wakrah SC	4	0	2	2	3	8	−5	2

Source: soccerway.com
Rules for classification: 1) points; 2) goal difference; 3) number of goals scored.

===== Results =====
Date	Team 1	Score	Team 2
2013/10/08	Al-Gharafa SC	2–2	Al-Ahli SC
2013/10/08	Al-Wakrah	0–0	Al-Kharaitiyat SC
2013/10/12	El Jaish SC	0–0	Al-Ahli SC
2013/10/12	Al-Gharafa SC	1–1	Al-Wakrah SC
2013/11/12	El Jaish SC	4–1	Al-Kharaitiyat SC
2013/11/13	Al-Ahli SC	2–1	Al-Wakrah SC
2013/11/18	El Jaish SC	5–1	Al-Wakrah SC
2013/11/18	Al-Kharaitiyat SC	2–0	Al-Gharafa SC
2013/12/21	Al-Kharaitiyat SC	1–2	Al-Ahli SC
2013/12/21	El Jaish SC	2–0	Al-Gharafa SC

==== Group C ====
Pos	Team	Pld	W	D	L	GF	GA	GD	Pts
1	Umm Salal SC	3	2	1	0	13	5	+8	7
2	Qatar SC	3	2	1	0	8	4	+4	7
3	Al-Duhail SC	3	1	0	2	8	12	−4	3
4	Al-Sailiya SC	3	0	0	3	5	13	−8	0

Source: soccerway.com
Rules for classification: 1) points; 2) goal difference; 3) number of goals scored.

===== Results =====
Date	Team 1	Score	Team 2
2013/10/08	Al-Duhail SC	4–2	Al-Sailiya SC
2013/10/08	Umm Salal SC	1–1	Qatar SC
2013/11/13	Al-Sailiya SC	3–6	Umm Salal SC
2013/11/13	Al-Duhail SC	3–4	Qatar SC
2013/12/20	Al-Duhail SC	1–6	Umm Salal SC
2013/12/20	Qatar SC	3–0	Al-Sailiya SC

== Knockout round ==
=== Semi-finals ===
1 March 2014
15:00 AST (UTC+3)

Al Sadd SC	3–2	Umm Salal SC
Abdulaziz Al-Ansari 28'; Saleh Al-Yazidi 91'; Rodrigo Tabata 96'	Report	Cabore 53'; Abdulaziz Al-Yahri 92'

Grand Hamad Stadium
2 March 2014
15:00 AST (UTC+3)

El Jaish SC	2–3	Qatar SC
Wagner Ribeiro 42', 92'	Report	Adriano 34'; Douglao 95'; Abdurahman Abubakar 108' (o.g.)

Grand Hamad Stadium

== Final ==
15 March 2014
15:00 AST (UTC+3)

Al Sadd SC	2–3	Qatar SC
Yousef Ahmad 20'; Saleh Al-Yazidi 21'	Report	Sin Jin-Ho 15'; Adriano 34', 59'

Grand Hamad Stadium
