= 2009 Emir of Qatar Cup =

Tournament details
- Host country: Qatar
- Dates: 24 April – 16 May
- Teams: 16

Final positions
- Champions: Al-Gharafa (6th title)

The 2009 Emir of Qatar Cup was the 37th edition of a men's football tournament in Qatar. The tournament is played by the 1st and 2nd Level divisions of the Qatari football league structure.

The top four sides of the 2008–09 Qatari League season entered at the quarter-final stage.

Al-Gharafa emerged as tournament champions. The winners of this knockout tournament should enter the AFC Champions League 2010 Asian club tournament, but due to Al-Gharafa winning the tournament, league runners up Al Sadd qualified.

Umm-Salal enter the tournament as the title holders.

== Bracket ==
Quarter-finals
(Qatar)	Al-Rayyan	3
(Qatar)	Al-Wakra	1
(Qatar)	Qatar Sports Club	2
(Qatar)	Al-Arabi	1
(Qatar)	Al-Sadd	3 (4)
(Qatar)	Al-Ahly	3 (2)
(Qatar)	Al-Gharrafa	4
(Qatar)	Al-Khor	2

Semi-finals
(Qatar)	Al-Rayyan	3 (4)
(Qatar)	Qatar Sports Club	3 (2)
(Qatar)	Al-Sadd	2 (6)
(Qatar)	Al-Gharrafa	2 (7)

Final
(Qatar)	Al-Rayyan	1
(Qatar)	Al-Gharrafa	2

== Fixtures and results ==
=== Round 1 ===
8 teams play a knockout tie. 4 clubs advance to the next round. Ties played over 24 & 25 April 2009

Tie no	Home team	Score	Away team
1	Al-Sailiya	8–1	Al-Mesaimeer
2	Al-Kharitiyath	4-1	Muaizar
3	Al-Ahly	1-0	Al-Markhiya
4	Al-Shamal	3-1	Al-Shahaniya

=== Round 2 ===
8 teams play a knockout tie. 4 clubs advance to the next round. Ties played over 29 & 30 April 2009

Tie no	Home team	Score	Away team
5	Al-Wakra	2–1	Al-Sailiya
6	Al-Arabi	1-0	Al-Kharitiyath
7	Umm-Salal	0-2	Al-Ahly
8	Al-Khor	1-0	Al-Shamal

=== Quarter-finals ===
8 teams play a knockout tie. 4 clubs advance to the semi-finals. Ties played on 9 & 10 May 2009

Tie no	Home team	Score	Away team
QF1	Al-Rayyan	3 - 1	Al-Wakra
QF2	Qatar Sports Club	2 - 1	Al-Arabi
QF3	Al-Sadd	3 - 3	Al-Ahly
Al Sadd won 4 - 2 on penalties
QF4	Al-Gharrafa	4 - 2	Al-Khor

=== Semi-finals ===
4 teams play a knockout tie. 2 clubs advance to the final. Ties played on 13 May 2009

13 May 2009
14:30 GMT

Al-Rayyan	3 – 3 (a.e.t.)	Qatar SC
Amara Diané 23' 51' 83'; Majdi Siddiq (yellow card) 44'; Younes Ali (yellow card) 69'		Marcinho (yellow card) 13'; Taisir Al-Jassim 34'; Roger 62'; Talal El Karkouri 73'; Youssef Safri (yellow card) 88'

Jassim Bin Hamad Stadium
Referee: (Belgium) Frank De Bleeckere
- Al-Rayyan advance 4-2 on penalties
13 May 2009
17:30 GMT

Al-Sadd	2 – 2 (a.e.t.)	Al-Gharafa
Yusef Ahmed 48'; Khalifa Ayil 118'		Younis Mahmoud 30'; Saad Al-Shammari (yellow card) 47'; Anas Mubarak 91'

Jassim Bin Hamad Stadium
Referee: (Switzerland) Massimo Bussacca
- Al-Gharafa advance 7-6 on penalties

=== Final ===
16 May 2009
16:00 GMT

Al-Rayyan	1 – 2	Al-Gharrafa
Éder Gaúcho (yellow card) 53'; Adel Lamy (yellow card) 66'; Amara Diané (yellow card) 69' (goal) 77'; Hassan Mudhafar (yellow card) 79'		Clemerson de Araújo 6' 90+1'; George Kwasi (yellow card) 18' (yellow-red card) 64'; Hamed Shami (yellow card) 90+2'

Khalifa International Stadium
Referee: (Italy) Roberto Rosetti

Emir of Qatar Cup
2009 Winners

Al-Gharrafa
6th Title
