= Ali Jasimi =

Qatari footballer (born 1991)

Personal information
- Full name: Ali Mohammed Jasimi
- Date of birth: 19 April 1991 (age 35)
- Place of birth: Qatar
- Height: 1.73 m (5 ft 8 in)
- Positions: Midfielder; right-back

Senior career*
Years	Team	Apps	(Gls)
2012	Al Rayyan	1	(0)
2012–2013	Al-Arabi	9	(0)
2013–2015	Al Ahli	39	(0)
2015–2017	Al-Arabi	40	(0)
2017–2019	Qatar SC	36	(1)
2019–2020	Al-Duhail	3	(0)
2020–2023	Al-Sailiya	30	(0)
2023–2024	Al Rayyan	0	(0)
2024	→Al-Markhiya (loan)	2	(0)
- * Club domestic league appearances and goals as of 29 May 2023 (UTC)

Ali Mohammed Jasimi (born 19 April 1991) is a Qatari professional footballer who plays as a right back. He is mostly known for his passing style of play, especially his crosses, which he uses to provide width for his respective team. He is seen as one of the best passers in the league.

== Playing career ==
Jasimi made his professional debut with Al Rayyan on 11 March 2012 in a 5–1 win against Al-Gharafa, replacing Mosaab Mahmoud Al Hassan after 83 minutes. This would be his only appearance with the team, although Al Rayyan won the 2012 Qatar Crown Prince Cup with Jasimi on the bench. He signed with Al-Arabi in late 2012, making his debut in September. He made 10 appearances during the 2012–13 league campaign and playoffs.

Jasimi later signed with Al Ahli in June 2013. He made his debut with the team in a 2–2 draw against Al Gharafa on 8 October 2013. He played the full 90 minutes during the Qatari Stars Cup match. He went on to make 43 league and cup appearances over the next two seasons.

Jasimi returned to Al-Arabi in June 2015.

Jasimi joined Al-Duhail in July 2019 on a free transfer.

== Honours ==
=== Club ===
Al Rayyan

- Qatar Cup: 2012

Al Arabi

- Qatari Stars Cup: Runner-up 2012–13

Al-Sailiya SC

- Qatari Stars Cup: 2020-21, 2021-22
- Qatar FA Cup: 2021
