= Abdurahman Abubakar =

Qatari professional footballer (born 1990)

Personal information
- Full name: Abdurahman Abubakar Issa
- Date of birth: 3 August 1990 (age 36)
- Place of birth: Mecca, Saudi Arabia
- Height: 1.88 m (6 ft 2 in)
- Position: Defender

Team information
- Current team: Al Bidda
- Number: 3

Senior career*
Years	Team	Apps	(Gls)
2011–2017	El Jaish	73	(3)
2017–2018	Qatar	8	(0)
2018–2019	Al-Kharaitiyat	8	(0)
2019–2023	Umm Salal	33	(1)
2025–	Al Bidda	0	(0)

International career^{‡}
2014–	Qatar	6	(1)
- * Club domestic league appearances and goals as of 00:11, 20 November 2014 (UTC) ‡ National team caps and goals as of 00:11, 27 March 2016 (UTC)

Abdurahman Abubakar (Arabic: عبد الرحمن ابو بكر; born 3 August 1990) is a professional footballer who plays for Al Bidda as a defender. Born in Saudi Arabia, he represented the Qatar national team.

== Honours ==
=== Club ===
El Jaish SC

Winner

- Qatar Crown Prince Cup: 2014
- Qatari Stars Cup: 2012–13

Runner-up

- Qatar Stars League: 2011–12, 2013–14
