= 2011–12 Qatari Stars Cup =

Tournament details
- Country: Qatar
- Dates: 6 October 2011 – 2 March 2012
- Teams: 12

Final positions
- Champions: Al Wakra (1st title)
- Runners-up: Al-Kharitiyath

Tournament statistics
- Matches played: 33
- Goals scored: 101 (3.06 per match)

The 2011 Qatari Stars Cup took place from October 2011 to March 2012. It was the 3rd edition of the cup.

It featured 12 teams from the Qatar Stars League divided into two groups, with the winner and runner-up of each group advancing to the semi-finals.

== Prizes ==
The 2011 edition of Qatar Stars Cup was sponsored by Qatar National Bank (QNB).

Winners: QR1,000,000
Runners-up: QR500,000
Match winner: QR40,000

== Round One ==
Group A	Group B
Al-Sadd; Lekhwiya; Al-Rayyan; Al-Kharitiyath; Qatar SC; Al-Ahli	Al-Gharafa; Umm-Salal; Al-Arabi; Al-Wakra; Al-Khor; El Jaish

=== Group A ===
Pos	Team	Pld	W	D	L	GF	GA	GD	Pts
1	Lekhwiya	5	4	0	1	15	7	+8	12
2	Al Kharitiyath	5	3	1	1	12	6	+6	10
3	Al Rayyan	5	2	2	1	12	6	+6	8
4	Al Sadd	5	2	1	2	5	11	−6	7
5	Qatar SC	5	2	0	3	7	12	−5	6
6	Al Ahli	5	0	0	5	4	13	−9	0

Rules for classification: 1) points; 2) goal difference; 3) number of goals scored.

Date	Team 1	Score	Team 2
2011-10-07	Al Sadd	1–0	Qatar SC
2011-10-08	Lekhwiya	3–1	Al-Ahli
2011-10-09	Al-Rayyan	2–2	Al-Kharitiyath
2011-11-12	Lekhwiya	3–1	Al-Rayyan
2011-11-12	Al-Kharitiyath	2–3	Qatar SC
2011-11-13	Al-Ahli	2–3	Al Sadd
2011-12-06	Al-Ahli	0–4	Al-Rayyan
2011-12-06	Al Sadd	0–4	Al-Kharitiyath
2011-12-07	Qatar SC	1–3	Lekhwiya
2011-12-11	Qatar SC	2–1	Al-Ahli
2011-12-12	Al-Kharitiyath	3–1	Lekhwiya
2011-12-12	Al-Rayyan	0–0	Al Sadd
2011-12-15	Al Sadd	1–5	Lekhwiya
2011-12-15	Qatar SC	1–5	Al-Rayyan
2011-12-17	Al-Ahli	0–1	Al-Kharitiyath

=== Group B ===
Pos	Team	Pld	W	D	L	GF	GA	GD	Pts
1	Umm Salal	5	3	1	1	6	4	+2	10
2	Al Wakra	5	2	2	1	7	6	+1	8
3	Al-Arabi	5	2	1	2	3	3	0	7
4	El Jaish	5	2	0	3	9	7	+2	6
5	Al Gharafa	5	2	0	3	6	7	−1	6
6	Al Khor	5	2	0	3	5	9	−4	6

Rules for classification: 1) points; 2) goal difference; 3) number of goals scored.

Date	Team 1	Score	Team 2
2011-10-07	Umm Salal	2–1	El Jaish
2011-10-08	Al Arabi	0–1	Al Khor
2011-10-09	Al-Gharafa	2–0	Al Wakra
2011-11-12	Al Khor	1–2	Umm Salal
2011-11-13	Al Arabi	0–1	Al-Gharafa
2011-11-13	Al Wakra	2–1	El Jaish
2011-12-06	Al Khor	2–1	Al-Gharafa
2011-12-07	Umm Salal	1–1	Al Wakra
2011-12-07	El Jaish	0–1	Al Arabi
2011-12-11	El Jaish	3–0	Al Khor
2011-12-11	Al Wakra	1–1	Al Arabi
2011-12-12	Al-Gharafa	0–1	Umm Salal
2011-12-15	Umm Salal	0–1	Al Arabi
2011-12-16	El Jaish	4–2	Al-Gharafa
2011-12-17	Al Khor	1–3	Al Wakra

== Semi-finals ==
26 February 2012

Lekhwiya	2 – 3	Al Wakra
Bakari Koné 54'; Dagano 80'		Mohannad Adnan Derjal 45'; Younis Mahmoud 46'; Nashat Akram 85'

27 February 2012

Umm Salal	2 – 3	Al-Kharitiyath
Magno Alves; Cabore		Jaycee John 7', 63'; Ahmed Kohayal 35'

== Final ==
2 March 2012

Al Wakra	0 – 0 10 – 9 p	Al-Kharitiyath

== Champions ==
Qatari Stars Cup
2011 winners

1st title
