= 2014 Qatar Crown Prince Cup =

2014 Qatar Cup
Tournament details
- Country: Qatar
- Dates: April 19 – April 26
- Teams: 4

Final positions
- Champions: El Jaish
- Runners-up: Lekhwiya

Tournament statistics
- Matches played: 3
- Goals scored: 7 (2.33 per match)

The 2014 Qatar Cup, more widely known as the Crown Prince Cup, was the twentieth in the series, and took place from April 19 to 26. The cup was contested by the top four finishers in 2013–14 Qatar Stars League. 2014 was the first year in which Al-Sailiya participated.

== 2014 participants ==
- Lekhwiya : 2013–14 Qatar Stars League champions
- El Jaish : 2013–14 Qatar Stars League runners up
- Al-Sadd : 2013–14 Qatar Stars League third place
- Al-Sailiya : 2013–14 Qatar Stars League 4th place

== Bracket ==
Semi-finals
2014-04-19 - Doha
(Qatar) Lekhwiya	2 (4)
(Qatar) Al-Sailiya	2 (1)
2014-04-19 - Doha
(Qatar) El Jaish	1
(Qatar) Al-Sadd	0

Final
2014-04-26 - Doha
(Qatar) Lekhwiya	1 (3)
(Qatar) El Jaish	1 (4)

== Match details ==
=== Semi-finals ===
19 April 2014
17:15

El Jaish	1 – 0	Al-Sadd
Go Seul-Ki 15'	Report; Report

Suheim Bin Hamad Stadium, Doha
19 April 2014
20:00

Lekhwiya	2 – 2	Al-Sailiya
Nam Tae-Hee 1'; Youssef Msakni 3'	Report; Report	Majdi Siddiq 45'; Mohammed Salah 89'
Penalties
	4 – 1

Suheim Bin Hamad Stadium, Doha

== Final ==
26 April 2014
19:00

Lekhwiya	1 – 1	El Jaish
Penalties
	3 – 4

Abdullah bin Khalifa Stadium, Doha
