= Mohamed Salah Elneel =

Qatari footballer (born 1991)

Mohamed Salah
Personal information
- Full name: Mohamed Salah Elneel
- Date of birth: 20 April 1991 (age 35)
- Place of birth: Khartoum, Sudan
- Height: 1.74 m (5 ft 8 1/2 in)
- Position: Winger

Senior career*
Years	Team	Apps	(Gls)
2011–2017	Al-Rayyan	23	(3)
2014	→ Al-Sailiya (loan)	7	(1)
2014–2015	→ Al-Sailiya (loan)	18	(4)
2017	→ Al-Shahania (loan)	0	(0)
2017–2020	Al-Markhiya	18	(8)
2018–2020	→ Al Arabi (loan)	36	(11)
2020–2023	Al Arabi	22	(3)
2021–2022	→ Al-Sailiya (loan)	20	(2)
2023–2024	Muaither	11	(0)
2025	Al Kharaitiyat	4	(0)

International career
2010	Qatar U23	3	(0)
2013–2022	Qatar	2	(0)
- * Club domestic league appearances and goals

Mohamed Salah Elneel (Arabic: محمد صلاح النيل; born 20 April 1991) is a footballer. He currently plays as a winger. Born in Sudan, he played for the Qatar national team.

== Club career ==
Elneel started his career with Al-Rayyan SC in 2011. Between 2014 and 2017, he was loaned to Al-Sailiya SC and Al Shahaniya SC. In August 2017 he joined Al-Markhiya SC and was loaned to Al-Arabi SC in 2018. He then signed permanently for Al-Arabi SC in 2020. In August 2021 he was loaned to Al-Sailiya SC and returned to Al-Arabi SC in June 2022.

== Honours ==
Al-Rayyan SC

- Qatar Stars League: 2015-16
- Sheikh Jassim Cup: 2012, 2013
- Emir of Qatar Cup: 2010, 2011, 2013
- Qatar Cup: 2012

Al-Sailiya SC

- Qatari Stars Cup: 2021-22

Qatar

- WAFF Championship: 2014
