= Majdi Siddiq =

Qatari footballer (born 1985)

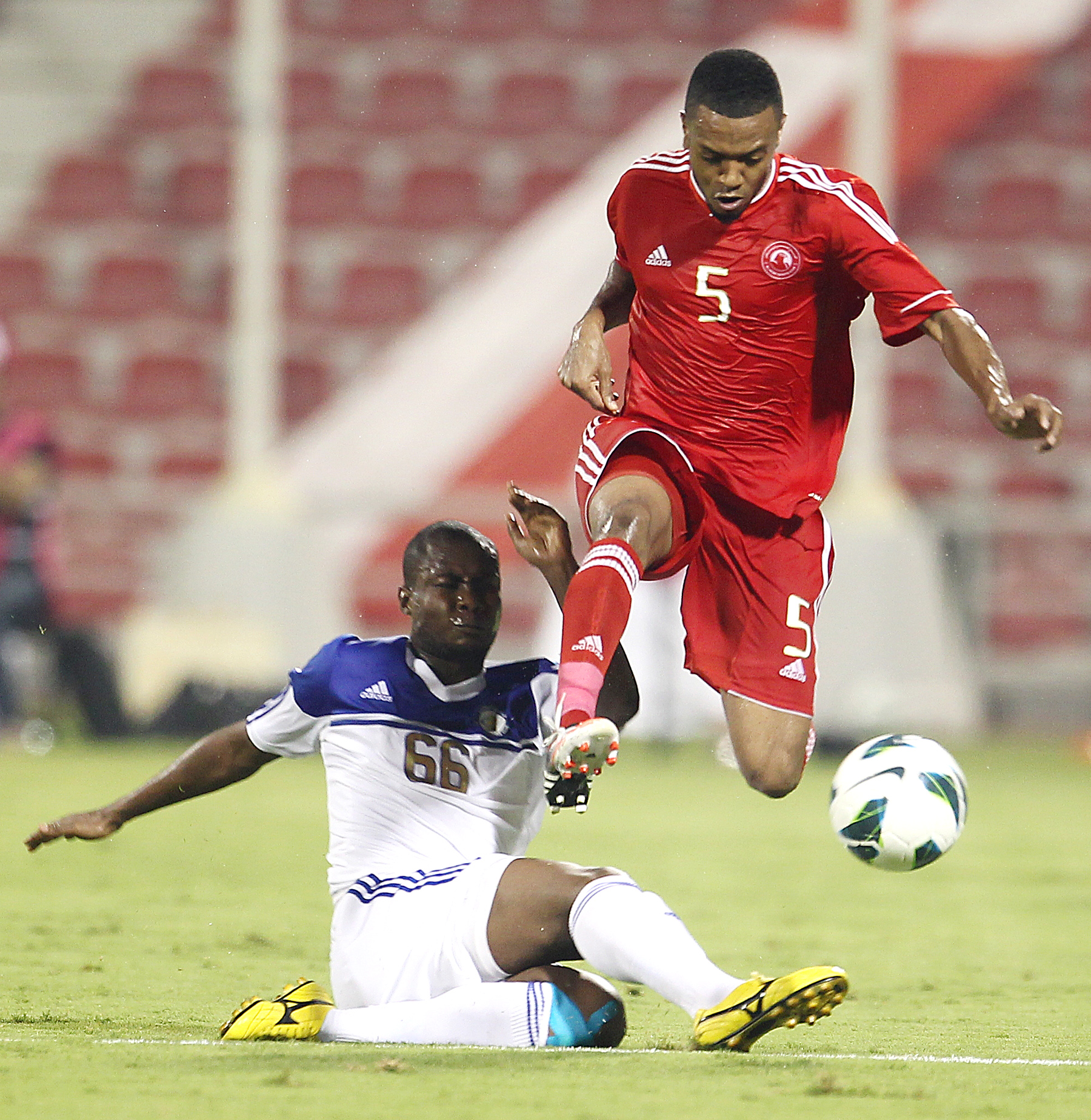
- Siddiq (2012)

Personal information
- Full name: Majdi Abdulla Siddiq
- Date of birth: 3 September 1985 (age 41)
- Place of birth: Riyadh, Saudi Arabia
- Height: 1.74 m (5 ft 9 in)
- Position: Midfielder

Senior career*
Years	Team	Apps	(Gls)
2002–2003	Al-Markhiya		
2003–2008	Al-Khor	80	(3)
2008–2009	Al-Rayyan	23	(1)
2009–2011	Al-Sadd	18	(0)
2011–2013	Al Arabi	28	(1)
2013	Al-Gharafa	8	(0)
2013–2023	Al-Sailiya	200	(7)
2017	→ El Jaish (Loan)	7	(0)

International career^{‡}
	QatarU20	1	(0)
	QatarU23	12	(4)
2004–2015	Qatar	56	(4)
- * Club domestic league appearances and goals as of 29 May 2023 ‡ National team caps and goals as of 23 August 2022

Majdi Siddiq (Arabic: مجدي صديق; born 3 September 1985) is a former footballer who played as a midfielder. Born in Saudi Arabia, he represented the Qatar national team.

== Career statistics ==
Statistics accurate as of 31 March 2023

Club	Season	League	League		Cup^{1}		Other Local Cups		Continental^{2}		Total	
Club	Season	League	Apps	Goals	Apps	Goals	Apps	Goals	Apps	Goals	Apps	Goals
Al-Khor	2003–04	QSL	9	0								
Al-Khor	2004–05	QSL	8	0								
Al-Khor	2005–06	QSL	23	0								
Al-Khor	2006–07	QSL	17	0								
Al-Khor	2007–08	QSL	23	3								
Al-Khor	Total		80	3								
Al-Rayyan	2008–09	QSL	23	1							28	1
Al-Rayyan	Total		23	1							28	1
Al-Sadd	2009–10	QSL	7	0					0	0		
Al-Sadd	2010–11	QSL	11	0					9	3		
Al-Sadd	Total		18	0					9	3	34	4
Al-Arabi	2011–12	QSL	22	1					5	0		
Al-Arabi	2012–13	QSL	6	0								
Al-Arabi	Total		28	1					5	0		
Al-Gharafa	2012–13	QSL	8	0					6	2	17	2
Al-Gharafa	Total		8	0					6	2	17	2
Al-Sailiya	2013–14	QSL	26	0								
Al-Sailiya	2014–15	QSL	25	0								
Al-Sailiya	2015–16	QSL	26	1								
Al-Sailiya	2016–17	QSL	17	0								
Al-Sailiya	2017–18	QSL	19	2								
Al-Sailiya	2018–19	QSL	19	2								
Al-Sailiya	2019–20	QSL	20	0					1	0		
Al-Sailiya	2020–21	QSL	12	1								
Al-Sailiya	2021–22	QSL	22	1								
Al-Sailiya	2022–23	QSL	9	0								
Al-Sailiya	Total		195	7					1	0	243	12
El Jaish SC (loan)	2016–17	QSL	7	0					1	0	12	0
Career total			365	12	36	3	49	4	22	5		

^{1}Includes Emir of Qatar Cup.

^{3}Includes AFC Champions League.

=== International goals ===
Scores and results list Qatar's goal tally first.

#	Date	Venue	Opponent	Score	Result	Competition
1.	13 February 2004	Doha, Qatar	Bahrain	2-0	Won	Friendly
2.	6 September 2008	Doha, Qatar	Uzbekistan	3–0	Won	2010 FIFA World Cup qualification
3.	11 January 2009	Muscat, Oman	Yemen	2–1	Won	19th Arabian Gulf Cup
4.	3 September 2010	Doha, Qatar	Bahrain	1–1	Draw	Friendly

== Honours ==
=== Club ===
Al Sadd SC

- Qatari Stars Cup: 2010-11

Al-Arabi SC

- Sheikh Jassim Cup: 2011

Al-Sailiya SC

- Qatar FA Cup: 2021
- Qatari Stars Cup: 2020-21, 2021-22

== Personal life ==
He was married in May 2007.
