= Hawra al-Nadawi =

Iraqi writer (born 1984)

Hawra Ayad Bunyan al-Nadawi (Arabic: حوراء اياد بنيان الندوي; Born August 1984) is an Iraqi writer. She was born in Baghdad, to Arab and Kurdish parents. Both her parents were political prisoners under the regime of Saddam Hussein, and as an infant, al-Nadawi stayed in Iraqi jails with her mother. The family left Iraq for Denmark after the 1991 uprising against the regime, when Hawra was just six years old. She grew up in Copenhagen, speaking Arabic, Kurdish and Danish languages. She also studied Latin, French, German and English at school. She has stated that as a young reader, she was fascinated by the works of Egyptian writers which she discovered in her local library. From an early age, she wrote stories, book reviews, and poems.

Al-Nadawi's debut novel Under the Copenhagen Sky was published by Dar al-Saqi and was longlisted for the 2012 Arabic Booker Prize. She was the only female nominee in 2012, as well as the youngest.

She studies linguistics and lives in London. She is married to footballer Nashat Akram, who played for the Al-Shorta Sports Club where her father Ayad Bunyan was the club president.
