= 2009 Sheikh Jassim Cup =

Association football competition in Qatar

The 2009 Sheikh Jassim Cup was the 31st edition of the league cup competition for football teams from Qatar.

Al-Arabi were the defending champions.

== Round one groups ==
12 clubs were drawn into 4 groups of 4 teams. The winners qualified for the semi-finals.

All group games were played in one 'host' location, instead of the common home and away format used in other competitions

Group A	Group B	Group C	Group C
Al-Gharafa; Al-Sailiya; Al-Wakra; Al-Markhiya	Al-Sadd; Al-Arabi; Al-Kharitiyath; Al-Shahaniya	Umm-Salal; Al-Rayyan; Al-Ahli; Al-Mesaimeer	Al-Khor; Qatar SC; Al-Shamal; Al-Mu'aidar

== Standings and results ==
=== Group A ===
Pos	Team	Pld	W	D	L	GF	GA	GD	Pts	GHR	SLY	WKR	MRK
1	Al Gharafa	3	3	0	0	13	2	+11	9		2–0	3–2	8–0
2	Al Sailiya	3	2	0	1	5	2	+3	6				3–0
3	Al Wakra	3	1	0	2	8	5	+3	3		0–2		6–0
4	Al-Markhiya	3	0	0	3	0	17	−17	0				

Updated to match(es) played on 28 August 2009. Source: goalzz.com
Rules for classification: 1) points; 2) goal difference; 3) number of goals scored.

=== Group B ===
Pos	Team	Pld	W	D	L	GF	GA	GD	Pts	SDD	ARB	KHR	SHH
1	Al Sadd	3	3	0	0	13	2	+11	9		4–2	5–0	4–0
2	Al-Arabi	3	1	1	1	5	4	+1	4				3–0
3	Al Kharitiyath	3	1	1	1	1	5	−4	4		0–0		1–0
4	Al Shahaniya	3	0	0	3	0	8	−8	0				

Updated to match(es) played on 28 August 2009. Source: goalzz.com
Rules for classification: 1) points; 2) goal difference; 3) number of goals scored.

=== Group C ===
Pos	Team	Pld	W	D	L	GF	GA	GD	Pts	USL	RYY	AHL	MSM
1	Umm Salal	3	3	0	0	12	3	+9	9		2–1	5–1	5–1
2	Al Rayyan	3	2	0	1	15	3	+12	6				9–0
3	Al Ahli	3	1	0	2	4	10	−6	3		1–5		2–0
4	Mesaimeer	3	0	0	3	1	16	−15	0				

Updated to match(es) played on 28 August 2009. Source: goalzz.com
Rules for classification: 1) points; 2) goal difference; 3) number of goals scored.

=== Group D ===
Pos	Team	Pld	W	D	L	GF	GA	GD	Pts	KHR	QTR	SHM	MDR
1	Al Khor	3	2	1	0	9	2	+7	7		1–1	4–0	4–1
2	Qatar SC	3	2	1	0	6	2	+4	7				4–1
3	Al Shamal	3	0	1	2	1	6	−5	1		0–1		1–1
4	Al-Mu'aidar	3	0	1	2	3	9	−6	1				

Updated to match(es) played on 28 August 2009. Source: goalzz.com
Rules for classification: 1) points; 2) goal difference; 3) number of goals scored.

== Semi-finals ==
1 September 2009
18:00

Al-Sadd	2 – 2 1-3 pens	Al-Khor
Hassan Al-Haydos 31'; Yusef Ahmed 107'		Kasula 60'; Nasser Jalal 97'

1 September 2009
18:00

Al-Gharafa	2 – 3	Umm-Salal
Ibrahim Al-Ghanim 29'; Mergani Al-Zain 62'		Fábio César 52', 85'; Davi 102'

== Final ==
4 September 2009
18:00

Umm-Salal	2–0	Al-Khor
Magno Alves 24', 67'
