= Omar Mahmoud Khalaf =

Iraqi footballer (born 1990)

Omar Mahmoud
Personal information
- Full name: Omar Mahmoud Khalef
- Date of birth: 11 April 1990 (age 36)
- Place of birth: Al-Dibs, Kirkuk, Iraq
- Height: 1.85 m (6 ft 1 in)
- Position: Striker

Senior career*
Years	Team	Apps	(Gls)
2009–2013	Al-Gharafa	1	
2013–2014	Al-Khor SC		
- * Club domestic league appearances and goals

Omar Mahmoud Khalef (Arabic: عُمَر مَحمُود خَلَف; born 11 April 1990) is an Iraqi football striker who plays for Al-Gharafa in Qatar. He is the younger brother of Younis Mahmoud.
