= Amara Diané =

Ivorian footballer

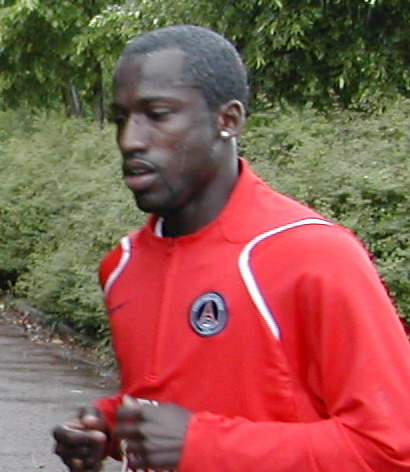
- Diané with Paris Saint-Germain in February 2008

Personal information
- Full name: Amara Salim Diané
- Date of birth: 19 August 1982 (age 44)
- Place of birth: Abidjan, Ivory Coast
- Height: 1.81 m (5 ft 11 in)
- Position: Striker

Youth career
- ASEC Abidjan
- FC Mantes

Senior career*
Years	Team	Apps	(Gls)
2000–2003	US Roye	34	(26)
2003–2005	Reims	69	(27)
2005–2006	Strasbourg	34	(9)
2006–2008	Paris Saint-Germain	71	(20)
2008–2010	Al-Rayyan	53	(29)
2010–2011	Al-Gharafa	11	(5)
2011–2012	Al-Nasr	18	(7)
2012–2013	Al-Dhafra	21	(4)
2014	Tubize	14	(3)
Total		325	(130)

International career
2006–2007	Ivory Coast	8	(3)
- * Club domestic league appearances and goals

Amara Salim Diané (born 19 August 1982) is an Ivorian former professional footballer, who played as a forward.

== Club career ==
Born in Abidjan, Diané started his career training at the ASEC Abidjan youth academy, before moving to the Parisian suburbs, where he joined the French side FC Mantes. Following his spell there, he moved to French fifth-tier club Roye in December 2000. In the 2002–03 season, he scored 26 goals in 34 games, and earned a transfer to Ligue 2 club Stade de Reims. After another season, he was signed by Ligue 1 club RC Strasbourg. After the eventual relegation of Strasbourg at the end of the season, he was linked with a number of clubs throughout Europe. Eventually, Paris Saint-Germain paid £2,300,000 for his services, signing him on a four-year deal. At the end of the 2007–08 Ligue 1 season PSG came close to being relegated, but on the final day of the season Diané scored twice in a 2–1 win over Sochaux to help secure their Ligue 1 status.

In May 2008, it was reported that English Premiership sides Newcastle United and Portsmouth were interested in signing the Ivorian, who was the season's top scorer at his club in the 2007–08 Ligue 1 season.

In July 2008, Diané was transferred from PSG to Qatari club Al-Rayyan Sports Club for a fee believed to be in the region of €8 million. He signed a contract worth €10 million over four years. Then, he signed a contract with Al-Gharafa Sports Club. Diané cited financial reasons for his decision to move to Qatar. He stated, "from now I want to ensure my family's financial future. And only a Qatari club can permit me to do it."

On 26 October 2011, Diané switched team from Gharafa to UAE Pro-League side Al-Nasr SC for Ecuadorian striker Carlos Tenorio.

After a short spell in Belgium's second division with A.F.C. Tubize, he retired.

== International career ==
Diané was called up to the Ivory Coast national team for their friendly against Senegal on 18 August 2006. However, due to a groin injury, he missed out on playing, also missing the African Cup of Nations qualifier against Gabon, where the Elephants won 5–0, with Arouna Koné scoring a hat-trick. He was again called up to the national squad for the friendly against Sweden on 15 November 2006, along with fellow PSG player and former Ivory Coast captain Bonaventure Kalou. However, he was an unused substitute in the game.

In March 2007, he was one of four players to receive a late call-up for the Ivorians to participate in the African Cup of Nations qualifier against Madagascar in Antananarivo, due to injuries to other members of the squad. Amara made his presence felt in the tie against Madagascar with the third goal, and his first for the Elephants, in the team's 3–0 victory. Amara was named in the Elephants provisional squad for the 2008 African Cup of Nations in Ghana, but was left out of the final squad, with the Ivorian's wealth of attacking options limiting his chances.

=== International goals ===
Scores and results list Ivory Coast's goal tally first.

#	Date	Venue	Opponent	Score	Result	Competition
1.	25 March 2007	Stade Municipal de Mahamasima, Antananarivo, Madagascar	Madagascar	3–0	3–0	2008 Africa Cup of Nations qualification
2.	21 November 2007	Jassim bin Hamad Stadium, Doha, Qatar	Qatar	1–1	6–1	Friendly
3.	21 November 2007	Jassim bin Hamad Stadium, Doha, Qatar	Qatar	3–1	6–1	Friendly

== Honours ==
Paris Saint-Germain

- Coupe de la Ligue: 2007–08

Al-Rayyan Sports Club

- Emir of Qatar Cup: 2010

Al-Gharafa Sports Club

- Qatar Crown Prince Cup: 2011
