= 2011 Sheikh Jassim Cup =

Tournament details
- Host country: Qatar
- Dates: 3 August - 24 August
- Teams: 18

Final positions
- Champions: Al-Arabi (6th title)

The 2011 Sheikh Jassim Cup was the 33rd edition of the league cup competition for football teams from Qatar.

Al-Arabi are the defending champions.

== Groups ==
18 clubs from the Qatar Stars League and Qatari 2nd Division were drawn into 4 groups. The winners of each group qualify for the semi-finals.

All group games are played in one 'host' location, instead of the common home and away format used in other competitions

Group A	Group B	Group C	Group D
Lekhwiya; Qatar SC; Al-Khor; Al-Markhiya; Al-Mesaimeer	Al-Sadd; Al-Gharafa; Al-Sailiya; El Jaish; Al-Shahaniya	Al-Kharitiyath; Umm-Salal; Al-Shamal; Al-Rayyan	Al-Arabi; Al-Wakra; Al-Ahli; Al-Mu'aidar

=== Standings ===
==== Group A ====
Pos	Team	Pld	W	D	L	GF	GA	GD	Pts
1	Lekhwiya	4	3	1	0	11	4	+7	10
2	Al-Khor	4	2	1	1	9	4	+5	7
3	Qatar SC	4	0	4	0	2	2	0	4
4	Al-Markhiya	4	1	1	2	3	6	−3	4
5	Mesaimeer	4	0	1	3	4	13	−9	1

Source: http://goalzz.com/main.aspx?c=7446
Rules for classification: 1) points; 2) goal difference; 3) number of goals scored.

==== Group B ====
Pos	Team	Pld	W	D	L	GF	GA	GD	Pts
1	El Jaish	4	2	2	0	14	6	+8	8
2	Al-Gharafa	4	2	1	1	10	4	+6	7
3	Al Sadd	4	2	0	2	3	7	−4	6
4	Al-Sailiya	4	1	1	2	5	11	−6	4
5	Al-Shahaniya	4	1	0	3	5	9	−4	3

Source: http://goalzz.com/main.aspx?c=7446
Rules for classification: 1) points; 2) goal difference; 3) number of goals scored.

==== Group C ====
Pos	Team	Pld	W	D	L	GF	GA	GD	Pts
1	Umm Salal	3	2	1	0	7	4	+3	7
2	Al Kharaitiyat	3	2	0	1	6	4	+2	6
3	Al Rayyan	3	1	0	2	6	9	−3	3
4	Al-Shamal	3	0	1	2	4	6	−2	1

Source: http://goalzz.com/main.aspx?c=7446
Rules for classification: 1) points; 2) goal difference; 3) number of goals scored.

==== Group D ====
Pos	Team	Pld	W	D	L	GF	GA	GD	Pts
1	Al-Arabi	3	3	0	0	8	0	+8	9
2	Al-Wakrah	3	1	1	1	5	4	+1	4
3	Al Ahli	3	1	1	1	3	4	−1	4
4	Al-Mu'aidar	3	0	0	3	1	9	−8	0

Source: http://goalzz.com/main.aspx?c=7446
Rules for classification: 1) points; 2) goal difference; 3) number of goals scored.

== Semi finals ==
August 21, 2011
21:30

Al-Arabi	3 – 2	El Jaish

August 21, 2011
21:30

Lekhwiya	1 – 2	Umm Salal
Waleed Jassim 5'		Cabore 16' (pen.); Mourad Meghni 90'

== Final ==
August 24, 2011
21:30

Al-Arabi	3 – 2 (a.e.t.)	Umm Salal
Wanderley Santos 2, 58'; Boualem Khoukhi 106'		Cabore 25'; Firas Al Khatib 66'
