= 2010 Qatari Stars Cup =

Tournament details
- Host country: Qatar
- Dates: 18 November - 23 December
- Teams: 12

Final positions
- Champions: Al Sadd (1st title)

Tournament statistics
- Top scorer(s): Yusef Ahmed (8 goals)
- All statistics correct as of 23 December 2010.

The 2nd Qatari Stars Cup started on 18 November 2010.

The Stars Cup is one of four competitions in the 2010–11 Qatari football season. 12 clubs are taking part in the tournament.

They were divided into two groups of six teams, with the winner and runner-up of each group will advancing to the semi-finals.

== Group stage ==
=== Group A ===
Team	Pld	W	D	L	GF	GA	GD	Pts
Umm Salal	5	4	0	1	8	2	+6	12
Al-Sadd	5	3	2	0	13	5	+8	11
Al Arabi	5	3	1	1	9	3	+6	10
Al-Khor	5	2	0	3	5	9	−4	6
Al-Wakra	5	1	1	3	5	8	−3	4
Al-Ahli	5	0	0	5	6	20	−14	0

2010-11-18
Al-Khor	3–2	Al-Ahli
2010-11-19
Umm Salal	1–0	Al Arabi
2010-11-20
Al-Sadd	1–1	Al-Wakra
2010-11-26
Al-Ahli	0–4	Umm Salal
2010-11-27
Al-Sadd	2–2	Al Arabi
Al-Wakra	0–1	Al-Khor
2010-12-04
Umm Salal	0–2	Al-Sadd
Al-Ahli	3–4	Al-Wakra
2010-12-05
Al-Khor	0–2	Al Arabi
2010-12-09
Al Arabi	2–0	Al-Wakra
2010-12-10
Al-Khor	0–2	Umm Salal
Al-Ahli	1–5	Al-Sadd
2010-12-15
Umm Salal	1–0	Al-Wakra
Al-Ahli	0–3	Al Arabi
Al-Khor	1–3	Al-Sadd

=== Group B ===
Team	Pld	W	D	L	GF	GA	GD	Pts
Qatar SC	5	3	1	1	12	8	+4	10
Al Rayyan	5	3	1	1	9	6	+3	10
Lekhwiya	5	2	3	0	11	6	+5	9
Al Sailiya	5	2	0	3	11	14	−3	6
Al-Gharrafa	5	1	1	3	5	10	−5	4
Al Kharitiyath	5	0	2	3	2	6	−4	2

2010-11-18
Lekhwiya	1–1	Al-Gharrafa
2010-11-19
Al Kharitiyath	0–0	Al Rayyan
2010-11-20
Qatar SC	5–2	Al Sailiya
2010-11-26
Qatar SC	1–1	Lekhwiya
Al-Gharrafa	1–0	Al Kharitiyath
2010-11-27
Al Rayyan	3–0	Al Sailiya
2010-12-04
Lekhwiya	5–1	Al Rayyan
2010-12-05
Al-Gharrafa	1–4	Qatar SC
Al Kharitiyath	1–3	Al Sailiya
2010-12-09
Qatar SC	0–3	Al Rayyan
Lekhwiya	0–0	Al Kharitiyath
2010-12-10
Al Sailiya	3–1	Al-Gharrafa
2010-12-14
Al-Gharrafa	1–2	Al Rayyan
Lekhwiya	4–3	Al Sailiya
Al Kharitiyath	1–2	Qatar SC

== Semi-finals ==
20 December 2010

Umm Salal	1 – 0	Al Rayyan
Derick Ogbu 70'

Thani bin Jassim Stadium

20 December 2010

Qatar SC	2 – 2 2 - 3 p	Al-Sadd

Qatar SC Stadium

== Final ==
23 December 2010

Umm Salal	0 – 1	Al-Sadd
		Yusef Ahmed 54'

Jassim Bin Hamad Stadium

== Champions ==
Qatari Stars Cup
2010 winners

1st title

== Statistics ==
=== Top goalscorers ===
Rank	Scorer	Club	Goals
1	(Qatar) Yusef Ahmed	Al Sadd	8
2	(Burkina Faso) Dagano	Al-Sailiya	5
2	(Brazil) Cabore	Al Arabi	5
4	(Ghana) Barro Seddiqi	Al-Sailiya	4
4	(Qatar) Fadhl Omar	Qatar SC	4
5	(Qatar) Ali Qassim	Umm Salal	3
