= 2011 Qatar Crown Prince Cup =

2011 Crown Prince Cup
Tournament details
- Host country: Qatar
- Dates: 24 April – 29 April
- Teams: 4

Final positions
- Champions: Al Gharrafa (3rd title)

Tournament statistics
- Top scorer(s): Juninho Pernambucano (2 goals)

The 2011 Qatar Crown Prince Cup is the 17th edition of the cup tournament in men's football (soccer). It is played by the top-4 teams of the Qatar Stars League after the end of each season.

== 2011 Participants ==
- Lekhwiya : 2010–11 Qatar Stars League Champion
- Al-Gharrafa : 2010–11 Qatar Stars League Runner Up
- Al Rayyan SC : 2010–11 Qatar Stars League 3rd Place
- Al-Arabi : 2010–11 Qatar Stars League 4th Place

== Bracket ==
Semi-finals
2011-04-24 - Doha
(Qatar) Lekhwiya	0
(Qatar) Al-Arabi	1
2011-04-25 - Doha
(Qatar) Al-Gharrafa	1 (5)
(Qatar) Al Rayyan	1 (4)

Final
2011-04-29 - Doha
(Qatar) Al-Arabi	0
(Qatar) Al-Gharrafa	2

== Match details ==
=== Semi-finals ===
April 24, 2011

Lekhwiya	0 – 1	Al-Arabi
		Cabore 50'

Suheim Bin Hamad Stadium, Doha

April 25, 2011

Al-Gharrafa	1 – 1 5 – 4 p	Al Rayyan
Juninho Pernambucano 77'		Hamid Ismail 94'

Suheim Bin Hamad Stadium, Doha

=== Final ===
April 29, 2011

Al-Arabi	0 – 2	Al-Gharrafa
		Mirghani Al Zain 34'; Juninho Pernambucano 76'

Suheim Bin Hamad Stadium, Doha
