= George Kwasi Semakor =

Qatari footballer (born 1988)

Personal information
- Full name: George Kwasi Semakor
- Date of birth: January 1, 1988 (age 38)
- Place of birth: Kumasi, Ghana
- Height: 1.69 m (5 ft 6 1/2 in)
- Position: Defender

Senior career*
Years	Team	Apps	(Gls)
2007–2008	Muaither		
2008–2017	Al Gharrafa	200	(2)
2017–2021	Al-Sailiya SC	60	(1)
2022–2023	Muaither	5	(0)

International career^{‡}
2010–2011	Qatar	5	(0)
- * Club domestic league appearances and goals as of 25/3/2023 ‡ National team caps and goals as of 25/3/2023

George Kwasi Semakor (born January 1, 1988) is a former footballer who played as a defender. Born in Ghana, he represented Qatar internationally.

== Career ==
George Kwasi Semakor left his club, Al-Mu'aidar, in August 2008 to sign with Al-Gharrafa Sports Club.

== International career ==
He is a member of the Qatar national football team.

== Personal life ==
Semakor was born in Kumasi to Ugandan parents.
