= 2009 Qatari Stars Cup =

Tournament details
- Country: Qatar
- Dates: 8 October 2009 – 5 January 2010
- Teams: 12

Final positions
- Champions: Al-Gharafa SC
- Runners-up: Al-Ahli SC

Tournament statistics
- Matches played: 30
- Goals scored: 108 (3.6 per match)

The 1st Qatari Stars Cup was held from 8 October 2009 to 5 January 2010. The Stars Cup is one of four competitions in the 2009–10 Qatari football season. 12 clubs took part in the tournament. They were divided into two groups of six teams, with the winner and runner-up of each group advanced to the semi-finals.

== Groups ==
Group 1	Group 2
Al Arabi; Al Sailiya; Al-Sadd; Qatar SC; Umm Salal; Al-Shamal	Al-Gharrafa; Al-Ahli; Al Rayyan; Al-Khor; Al Kharitiyath; Al-Wakra

== Fixtures and results ==
=== Group 1 ===
Team	Pld	W	D	L	GF	GA	GD	Pts
Al-Sailiya	5	4	0	1	10	5	+5	12
Al Arabi	5	3	1	1	13	8	+5	10
Al-Sadd	5	2	1	2	12	8	+4	7
Qatar SC	5	2	1	2	6	5	+1	7
Umm-Salal	5	1	1	3	4	9	−5	4
Al-Shamal	5	1	0	4	3	13	−10	3

October 8, 2009
Qatar SC	0–1	Al-Sailiya
Al Sadd	5–0	Al Shamal
Al Arabi	3–0	Umm Salal
October 15, 2009
Al Sadd	1–2	Qatar SC
Al Arabi	3–2	Al-Sailiya
Umm Salal	2–1	Al Shamal
November 11, 2009
Al Sadd	3–3	Al Arabi
Qatar SC	3–0	Al Shamal
November 12, 2009
Umm Salal	1–3	Al-Sailiya
November 16, 2009
Qatar SC	1–3	Al Arabi
Al Sadd	2–1	Umm Salal
Al-Sailiya	2–0	Al Shamal
December 26, 2009
Qatar SC	0–0	Umm Salal
December 29, 2009
Al Sadd	1–2	Al-Sailiya
Al Arabi	1–2	Al Shamal

=== Group 2 ===
Team	Pld	W	D	L	GF	GA	GD	Pts
Al-Ahli	5	4	0	1	11	3	+8	12
Al-Gharrafa	5	3	1	1	13	10	+3	10
Al Rayyan	5	2	2	1	9	10	−1	8
Al-Wakra	5	1	1	3	2	4	−2	4
Al-Khor	5	1	1	3	5	10	−5	4
Al Kharitiyath	5	0	3	2	7	10	−3	3

October 9, 2009
Al Wakra	1–0	Al Khor
Al-Gharrafa	3–2	Al Kharitiyath
Al Rayyan	0–3	Al Ahli
October 16, 2009
Al Khor	1–1	Al Kharitiyath
Al-Gharrafa	3–3	Al Rayyan
Al Wakra	0–1	Al Ahli
November 12, 2009
Al-Gharrafa	2–1	Al Wakra
November 13, 2009
Al Rayyan	2–2	Al Kharitiyath
Al Khor	1–0	Al Ahli
November 17, 2009
Al Rayyan	1–0	Al Wakra
Al-Gharrafa	5–1	Al Khor
Al Ahli	4–2	Al Kharitiyath
December 26, 2009
Al Wakra	0–0	Al Kharitiyath
December 29, 2009
Al Rayyan	3–2	Al Khor
Al-Gharrafa	0–3	Al Ahli

== Semi-finals ==
1 January 2010
13:00 UTC+7

Al-Ahli	2 – 1	Al Arabi

Jassim Bin Hamad Stadium

2 January 2010
15:15 UTC+7

Al-Sailiya	2 – 3	Al-Gharrafa

Jassim Bin Hamad Stadium

== Final ==
5 January 2010
15:15 UTC+7

Al-Ahli	0 – 5	Al-Gharrafa

Jassim Bin Hamad Stadium

Qatari Stars Cup
2009 winners

1st title
