= Mahir Yousef =

Qatari footballer (born 1988)

Personal information
- Full name: Mahir Yousef Bakr
- Date of birth: January 8, 1988 (age 38)
- Place of birth: Qatar
- Height: 1.81 m (5 ft 11 1/2 in)
- Position: Forward

Senior career*
Years	Team	Apps	(Gls)
2011–2015	El Jaish	29	(3)
2012–2013	→ Umm Salal SC (loan)	22	(6)
2014	→ Umm Salal SC (loan)	12	(2)
2014–2015	→ Qatar SC (loan)	17	(5)
2015–2017	Al-Wakrah	41	(9)
2017–2018	Umm Salal	13	(2)
2018–2019	Al-Kharaitiyat	8	(0)
2019–2020	Al-Sailiya	14	(1)
2020–2021	Mesaimeer	7	(0)
2021	Al Bidda	9	(3)
2021–2022	Al-Markhiya	7	(0)
2022–2023	Al Bidda	5	(0)

International career^{‡}
2013	Qatar	1	(0)
- * Club domestic league appearances and goals as of March 2013 ‡ National team caps and goals as of March 2013

Mahir Yousef is a Qatari footballer who plays as a forward. He is a capped member of the Qatar national football team.
