= 2012–13 Qatari Stars Cup =

Tournament details
- Country: Qatar
- Dates: 6 October 2012 – 24 March 2013
- Teams: 12

Tournament statistics
- Matches played: 24
- Goals scored: 71 (2.96 per match)

The 2012–13 Qatari Stars Cup is the 4th edition of the league cup competition in Qatar. It started on 6 October 2012.

It features 12 teams from the Qatar Stars League divided into two groups, with the winner and runner-up of each group advancing to the semi-finals.

== Round One ==
Group A	Group B
Al-Arabi; Al-Kharitiyath; Al-Sadd; El Jaish; Qatar SC; Umm-Salal	Al-Gharafa; Al-Khor; Al-Rayyan; Al-Sailiya; Al-Wakra; Lekhwiya

=== Group A ===
Pos	Team	Pld	W	D	L	GF	GA	GD	Pts
1	Al-Arabi	5	4	1	0	10	5	+5	13
2	El Jaish	5	4	0	1	13	4	+9	12
3	Qatar SC	5	2	1	2	8	8	0	7
4	Al Sadd	5	1	2	2	5	5	0	5
5	Umm Salal	5	1	2	2	4	8	−4	5
6	Al Kharitiyath	5	0	0	5	3	13	−10	0

Updated to match(es) played on 3 February 2013. Source: soccerway.com
Rules for classification: 1) points; 2) goal difference; 3) number of goals scored.

Date	Team 1	Score	Team 2
6 October 2012	Al-Kharitiyath	1–2	Umm-Salal
6 October 2012	El Jaish	1–2	Al-Arabi
6 October 2012	Al Sadd	1–1	Qatar SC
11 October 2012	Al Sadd	0–1	El Jaish
11 October 2012	Al-Arabi	1–1	Umm-Salal
11 October 2012	Qatar SC	3–0	Al-Kharitiyath
7 November 2012	Qatar SC	0–4	El Jaish
8 November 2012	Umm-Salal	0–0	Al Sadd
9 November 2012	Al-Kharitiyath	0–2	Al-Arabi
12 November 2012	Umm-Salal	0–2	Qatar SC
12 November 2012	Al-Arabi	2–1	Al Sadd
13 November 2012	El Jaish	3–1	Al-Kharitiyath
3 February 2013	Al-Kharitiyath	1–3	Al Sadd
3 February 2013	Qatar SC	2–3	Al-Arabi
3 February 2013	Umm-Salal	1–4	El Jaish

=== Group B ===
Pos	Team	Pld	W	D	L	GF	GA	GD	Pts
1	Lekhwiya	5	4	0	1	12	5	+7	12
2	Al Gharafa	5	4	0	1	11	8	+3	12
3	Al Sailiya	5	4	0	1	9	6	+3	12
4	Al Rayyan	5	2	0	3	11	11	0	6
5	Al Wakra	5	0	1	4	4	9	−5	1
6	Al Khor	5	0	1	4	4	12	−8	1

Updated to match(es) played on 4 February 2013. Source: soccerway.com
Rules for classification: 1) points; 2) goal difference; 3) number of goals scored.

Date	Team 1	Score	Team 2
7 October 2012	Al-Wakra	1–1	Al-Khor
7 October 2012	Al-Rayyan	1–2	Al-Sailiya
8 October 2012	Lekhwiya	5–1	Al-Gharafa
12 October 2012	Lekhwiya	2–1	Al-Rayyan
12 October 2012	Al-Gharafa	1–0	Al-Wakra
12 October 2012	Al-Sailiya	3–2	Al-Khor
7 November 2012	Al-Wakra	0–2	Al-Sailiya
7 November 2012	Al-Gharafa	4–3	Al-Rayyan
8 November 2012	Al-Khor	0–2	Lekhwiya
12 November 2012	Al-Sailiya	2–1	Lekhwiya
13 November 2012	Al-Rayyan	3–2	Al-Wakra
13 November 2012	Al-Khor	0–3	Al-Gharafa
4 February 2013	Al-Wakra	1–2	Lekhwiya
4 February 2013	Al-Gharafa	2–0	Al-Sailiya
4 February 2013	Al-Khor	1–3	Al-Rayyan

== Semi finals ==
19 March 2013

Al-Arabi	2–1	Al-Gharafa

20 March 2013

Lekhwiya	0–1	El Jaish

== Final ==
24 March 2013

Al-Arabi	0–2	El Jaish
		Ilyas 33', 63'

Referee: Khamis Al-Marri
