= 2011 Emir of Qatar Cup =

Tournament details
- Host country: Qatar
- Dates: 21 April - 21 May
- Teams: 16

Final positions
- Champions: Al-Rayyan

The 2011 Emir of Qatar Cup was the 39th edition of a men's football tournament in Qatar. It is played by the 1st and 2nd Level divisions of the Qatari football league structure.

The top four sides of the 2010–11 Qatar Stars League season enter at the Quarter-final stage.

Al-Rayyan were the defending champions and successfully defended the title.

The cup winner were guaranteed a place in the 2012 AFC Champions League.

== First round ==
The first round of the competition involves four teams from the 2nd tier league.

| Team 1 | Score | Team 2 |
|---|---|---|
21 April 2011
| Al-Mu'aidar | 2–1 | Al-Markhiya |
| Al-Mesaimeer | 0–1 | Al-Shahaniya |

== Round 2 ==
| Team 1 | Score | Team 2 |
|---|---|---|
23 April 2011
| Al-Shamal | 0–1 | Umm-Salal |
26 April 2011
| Al-Ahli | 2–3 | Al-Jaish |
| Al-Sailiya | 2–1 | Al-Shahaniya |
| Al-Khor | 1–0 | Al-Mu'aidar |

== Round 3 ==
| Team 1 | Score | Team 2 |
|---|---|---|
26 April 2011
| Umm-Salal | 2–5 | Al-Sadd |
29 April 2011
| Al Wakrah | 2–1 | Al-Khor |
1 May 2011
| Qatar SC | 2–0 | Al-Sailiya |
| Al-Kharitiyath | 2–3 | Al-Jaish |

== Quarter finals ==
| Team 1 | Score | Team 2 |
|---|---|---|
6 May 2011
| Lekhwiya | 4–3 (a.e.t) | Al Wakrah |
| Al-Arabi | 1–2 | Al-Jaish |
7 May 2011
| Al Gharafa | 3–1 | Al-Sadd |
| Al-Rayyan | 2–1 | Qatar SC |

== Semi finals ==
| Team 1 | Score | Team 2 |
|---|---|---|
16 May 2011
| Lekhwiya | 0–0; 4-5 (Pens) | Al Gharafa |
17 May 2011
| Al-Jaish | 0–5 | Al-Rayyan |

== Final ==
| Team 1 | Score | Team 2 |
|---|---|---|
21 May 2011
| Al Gharafa | 1–2 | Al-Rayyan |
