= Yousef Ahmed (footballer, born 1988) =

Qatari international footballer

Personal information
- Full name: Yousef Ahmed Ali
- Date of birth: 14 October 1988 (age 38)
- Place of birth: Medina, Saudi Arabia
- Height: 1.71 m (5 ft 7 1/2 in)
- Position: Striker

Senior career*
Years	Team	Apps	(Gls)
2005–2015	Al-Sadd	103	(26)
2009–2010	→ Qatar SC (loan)	8	(2)
2015–2018	Al-Arabi	42	(6)
2018–2019	Al-Khor	4	(0)
2018–2019	→ Al-Shamal (loan)	6	(0)
2019	→ Umm Salal (loan)	1	(0)
2019–2021	Al Bidda	7	(1)

International career^{‡}
2003–2005	Qatar U-17	10	(9)
2008–2011	Qatar U-23	11	(2)
2006–2016	Qatar	55	(10)
- * Club domestic league appearances and goals as of 01:15, 13 December 2010 (UTC) ‡ National team caps and goals as of 19:33, 25 February 2017 (UTC)

Yousef Ahmed Ali (Arabic: يُوسُف أَحْمَد عَلِيّ; born 14 October 1988) is a former footballer who plays as a striker. Born in Saudi Arabia, he represented Qatar at international level.

== Career ==
In 2010, Ahmed won the 2010 Qatari Stars Cup with Al-Sadd. He was the top scorer of the tournament, with 8 goals in 7 games, including the only goal in the final against Umm Salal. He was offered a contract with Belgian club Standard Liège in February 2011, after his brilliant performance in the 2011 Asian Cup, but rejected the offer.

Ahmed was sidelined due to injury for most of the 2010/11 season, as a result he missed Al Sadd's historic triumph in the 2011 AFC Champions League. He returned from injury for the 2011/12 season.

== International goals ==
=== Under–17 ===
#	Date	Venue	Opponent	Score	Result	Competition
1.	7 September 2004	Japan	Bangladesh	6–1	Won	2004 AFC U-17 Championship
2.	7 September 2004	Japan	Bangladesh	6–1	Won	2004 AFC U-17 Championship
3.	9 September 2004	Japan	Uzbekistan	2–2	Draw	2004 AFC U-17 Championship
4.	12 September 2004	Japan	Kuwait	4–3	Won	2004 AFC U-17 Championship
5.	12 September 2004	Japan	Kuwait	4–3	Won	2004 AFC U-17 Championship
6.	18 September 2004	Japan	Iran	2–1	Won	2004 AFC U-17 Championship
7.	18 September 2004	Japan	Iran	2–1	Won	2004 AFC U-17 Championship
8.	17 September 2005	Estadio Miguel Grau, Piura	Netherlands	3–5	Lost	2005 FIFA U-17 World Championship
9.	20 September 2005	Estadio Miguel Grau, Piura	Gambia	1–3	Lost	2005 FIFA U-17 World Championship

=== Under–23 ===
#	Date	Venue	Opponent	Score	Result	Competition
1.	6 June 2008	Doha, Qatar	Pakistan	7–0	Won	2008 Summer Olympics – Men's Asian Qualifiers
2.	6 June 2008	Doha, Qatar	Pakistan	7–0	Won	2008 Summer Olympics – Men's Asian Qualifiers

=== Senior team ===
Scores and results list Qatar's goal tally first.

#	Date	Venue	Opponent	Score	Result	Competition
1.	20 August 2008	Doha, Qatar	Tajikistan	4–0	5–0	Friendly
2.	12 January 2011	Doha, Qatar	China	1–0	2–0	2011 AFC Asian Cup
3.	12 January 2011	Doha, Qatar	China	2–0	2–0	2011 AFC Asian Cup
4.	23 July 2011	Doha, Qatar	Vietnam	3–0	3–0	2014 FIFA World Cup qualification
5.	28 July 2011	Hanoi, Vietnam	Vietnam	1–0	1–2	2014 FIFA World Cup qualification
6.	22 May 2012	Madrid, Spain	Albania	1–2	1–2	Friendly
7.	8 June 2012	Doha, Qatar	South Korea	1–0	1–4	2014 FIFA World Cup qualification
8.	6 February 2013	Doha, Qatar	Malaysia	2–0	2–0	2015 AFC Asian Cup qualification
9.	27 March 2013	Doha, Qatar	Egypt	3–1	3–1	Friendly
10.	17 April 2013	Doha, Qatar	Palestine	2–0	2–0	Friendly

== Honors ==
=== Individual ===
- Qatari Stars Cup Top Scorer

2011

=== Club ===
- Al-Sadd

- Qatari League: 2006–07
- Sheikh Jassem Cup: 2007
- Qatari Stars Cup: 2010–11
- Qatar Crown Prince Cup: 2007, 2008
