= Caboré =

Brazilian footballer (born 1980)

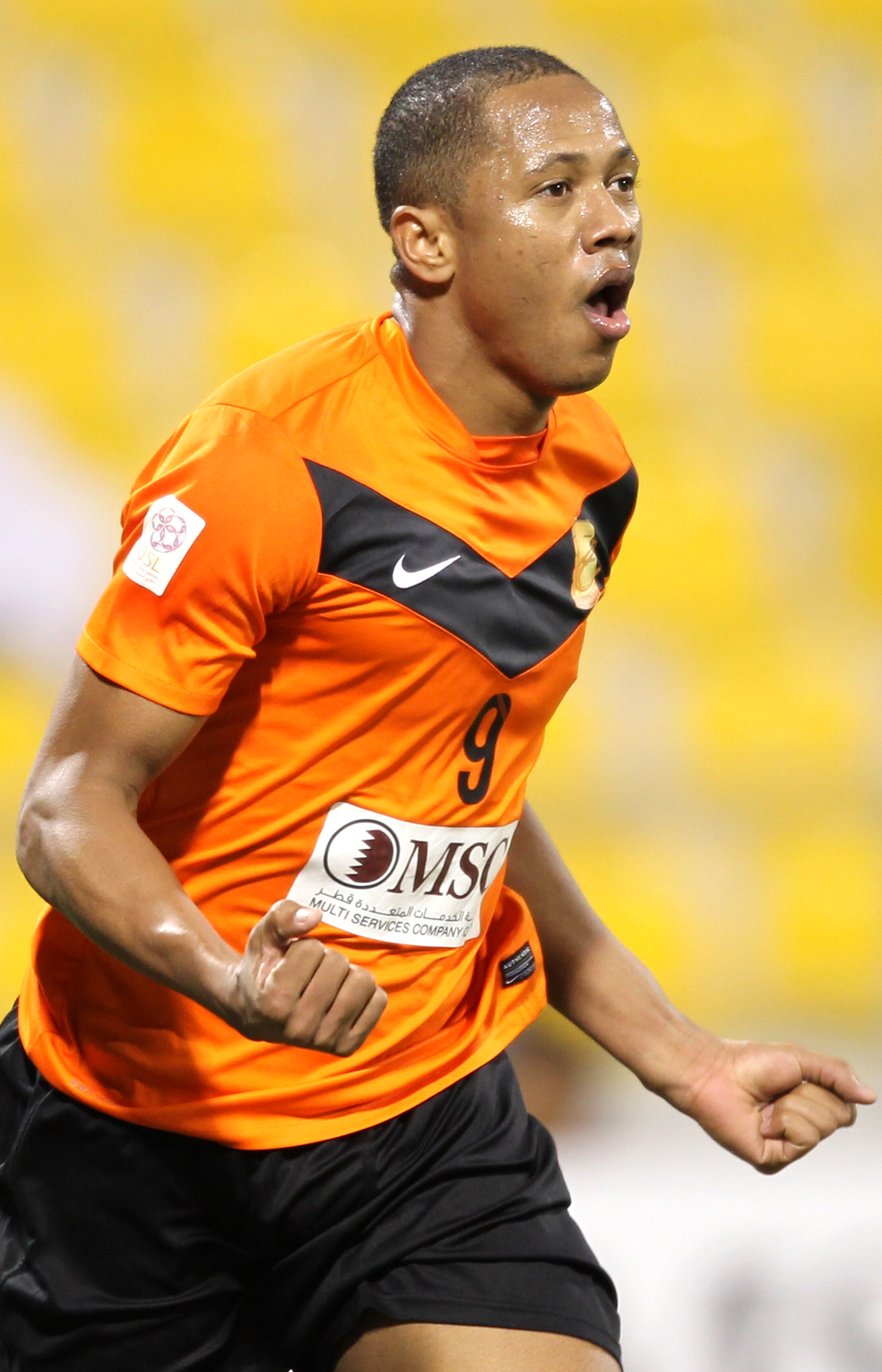

Personal information
- Full name: Everaldo de Jesus Pereira
- Date of birth: 19 February 1980 (age 46)
- Place of birth: Salvador, Bahia, Brazil
- Height: 1.87 m (6 ft 2 in)
- Position: Forward

Senior career*
Years	Team	Apps	(Gls)
2003	Ipitanga		
2004	Vitória		
2005	Bonsucesso		
2006	Ituano		
2007	Gyeongnam FC	26	(18)
2008–2009	FC Tokyo	55	(16)
2009–2011	Al-Arabi	34	(32)
2011–2014	Umm-Salal	54	(24)
- * Club domestic league appearances and goals

Everaldo de Jesus Pereira, also known as Caboré (born 19 February 1980) is a Brazilian former professional footballer who last played as a forward.

== Career ==
In 2007, Caboré won South Korea's K-League top scorer with 18 goals.

From 15 August until 27 September, he recorded a goal or an assist from 8 games and he was recorded in successive second place.

After an unsuccessful period at FC Tokyo of J1 League, he moved to Qatar to play for Al-Arabi in 2009 and then he became the top scorer of 2009–10 Qatari League. In addition, he won the 2010 Sheikh Jassem Cup for Al-Arabi, scoring a late winner and the only goal of the match. However, replays of the goal revealed it was a clear handball which was not spotted by the referee.

After his tenure at Al Arabi, he moved to Umm-Salal, making his debut against his former club.

== Career statistics ==
Appearances and goals by club, season and competition
Club	Season	League			National cup (Note: Includes Emperor's Cup.)		League cup (Note: Includes J.League Cup.)		Total	
Club	Season	Division	Apps	Goals	Apps	Goals	Apps	Goals	Apps	Goals
FC Tokyo	2008	J1 League	34	11	4	0	8	2	46	13
FC Tokyo	2009	J1 League	21	5	0	0	9	5	30	10
FC Tokyo	Total		55	16	4	0	17	7	76	23

== Honours ==
Individual

- K League top scorer: 2007
- Qatar Stars League top scorer: 2009–10
