= QSL Cup =

Men's knockout association football tournament in Qatar

- Founded: 2009; 17 years ago
- Region: Qatar
- Teams: 20
- Current champions: Al-Rayyan (1st title)
- Most championships: Al-Gharafa SC (3 titles)
- 2025–26 QSL Cup

The QSL Cup is a Qatari football competition formerly known as Qatari Stars Cup.

The knockout competition, which involves a round-robin structure, was first started in 2009 when the Qatar Stars League structure was amended. The competition was established to provide clubs with more competitive games during the regular season and was originally open only to clubs participating in the Qatar Stars League.

In 2024–25, the tournament was rebranded as the QSL Cup, with 11 teams participating in two groups. The tournament was expanded in 2025–26 to 20 teams, including the First and Second Division teams, which will form one league. The top 14 teams progress to the knockout stages.

== History ==
- 2009: Al-Gharafa SC 5–0 Al Ahli SC
- 2010: Al-Sadd SC 1–0 Umm Salal SC
- 2011–12: Al-Wakrah SC 0–0 (10–9 pen.) Al-Kharitiyath SC
- 2012–13: El Jaish 2–0 Al-Arabi
- 2013–14: Qatar SC 3–2 Al-Sadd SC
- 2014–17 Not held
- 2017–18: Al-Gharafa SC 3–2 Al-Rayyan SC
- 2018–19: Al-Gharafa SC 1–0 Al-Duhail SC
- 2019–20: Al-Sadd SC 4–0 Al-Arabi
- 2020–21: Al-Sailiya SC 2–0 Al-Rayyan SC
- 2021–22: Al-Sailiya SC 5–4 Al-Wakrah SC
- 2022–23: Al-Duhail 1–0 Umm Salal SC
- 2023–24: Umm Salal 4–4 (3–1 pen.) Al-Arabi
- 2024–25: Al-Duhail 2–1 Al-Arabi
- 2025–26: Al-Rayyan 2-0 Muaither

== Total titles ==
Club	Champions
Al-Gharafa	3
Al-Sadd	2
Al-Sailiya SC	2
Al-Duhail	2
Al-Wakrah	1
El-Jaish	1
Qatar SC	1
Umm Salal SC	1
Al-Rayyan	1

== Topscorers ==
=== Per season ===
Year	Player	Goals	Club
2010	(Qatar) Yusef Ahmed	8	Qatar SC
2014	(Qatar) Mahir Yousef		Qatar SC
