= Lekhwiya =

Internal security force of Qatar

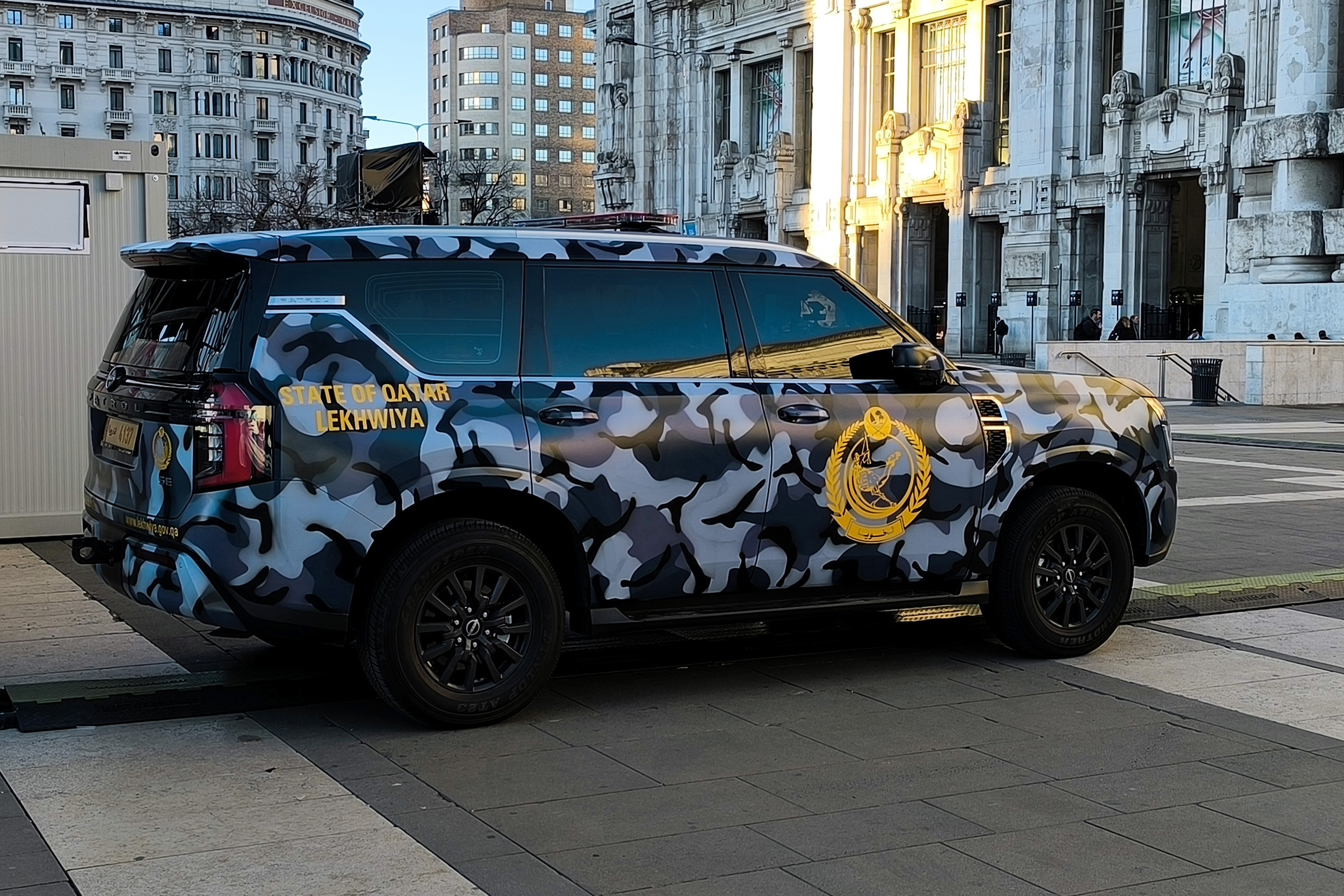
Lekhwiya car at Milano Centrale train station, brought in as reinforcement during the 2026 Winter Olympics

Lekhwiya is Qatar's elite internal security force established in 2004 to handle national security, counter-terrorism, VIP protection, and major event security. The name translates to "brother" in Arabic, and is a local term that historically referred to those who maintained law and order in the name of the state.

Reporting directly to the Emir, they represent a highly trained, militarized force distinct from regular police. They recently participated in 2025 National Day parades and 2025 United Nations General Assembly security.

Lekhwiya have conducted joint exercises with international forces including France's GIGN.

== See also ==
- Qatar State Security
- Law enforcement in Qatar
