= List of Al-Duhail SC seasons =

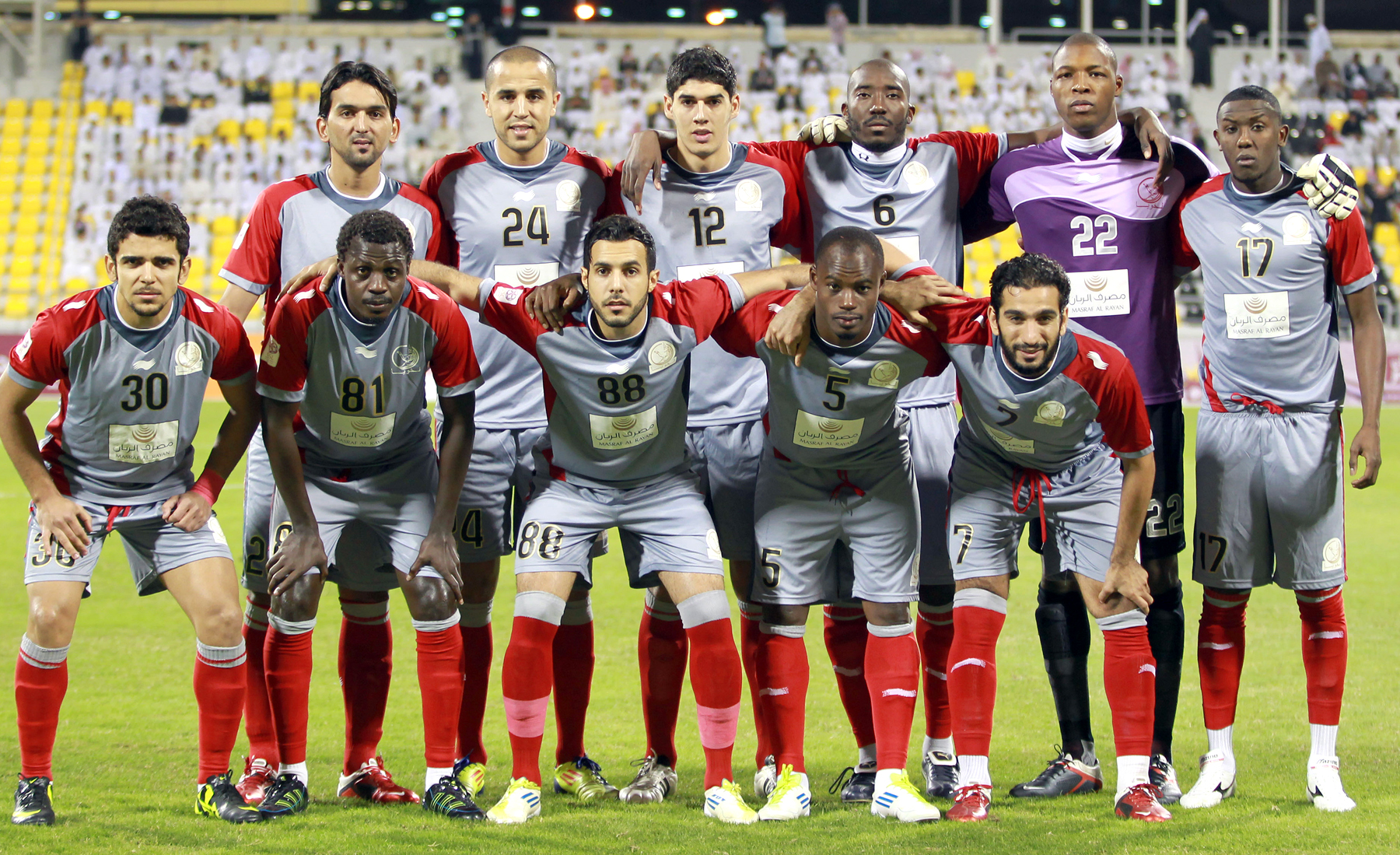
Lekhwiya's team in 2011 with From Left to Right: Stand Up : Nashat Akram - Madjid Bougherra - Karim Boudiaf - Dame Traoré - Baba Malick - Mohammed Musa. Sitting Luiz Ceará - ? - Hussain Ali Shehab - Mohammed Razak - Adel Lami.

Al-Duhail Sports Club is a Qatari professional football club based in Doha. The club was formed in 2009 as Lekhwiya Sports Club, and played their first competitive match in 2009, The club was renamed on April 10, 2017, it was decided to merge the two clubs, Lekhwiya and El Jaish SC into one entity under the name Al-Duhail Sports Club starting from the new season. The club has won a total of 56 major trophies, including the national championship 38 times also won the Emir of Qatar Cup 18 times, the Qatar Cup (ex) Crown Prince Cup 9 times, and the Sheikh Jassim Cup 6 times. The club has also never been out of the top division of Qatari football since his rise in the 2009–10 season.

This is a list of the seasons played by Al-Duhail SC from 2009 when the club first entered a league competition to the most recent seasons. The club's achievements in all major national and international competitions as well as the top scorers are listed. Top scorers in bold were also top scorers of Qatar Stars League. The list is separated into three parts, coinciding with the three major episodes of Qatari football:

== Seasons ==
(Qatar) QFA – season-by-season record of Al-Duhail Sports Club
Season	League									Emir Cup	Other	Asia		Top goalscorer(s)		Ref.
Season	Division	Pos	Pts	P	W	D	L	GF	GA	Emir Cup	Other	Asia		Name	Goals	
2009–10	D2	**1st**								Round 2						
2010–11	QSL	**1st**	48	22	15	3	4	40	17	Semi finals						
2011–12	QSL	**1st**	43	22	12	7	3	36	16	Quarter-Finals	Semi finals	Champions League	Group stage	Nam Tae-Hee	7	
2012–13	QSL	2nd	46	22	14	4	4	42	22	Semi finals	**Winner**	Champions League	Quarter-finals	**Sebastián Soria**	23	
2012–13	QSL	2nd	46	22	14	4	4	42	22	Semi finals	Group stage	Champions League	Quarter-finals	**Sebastián Soria**	23	
2013–14	QSL	**1st**	53	26	16	5	5	55	30	Quarter finals	Runner-up	Champions League	Group stage			
2013–14	QSL	**1st**	53	26	16	5	5	55	30	Quarter finals	Group stage	Champions League	Group stage			
2014–15	QSL	**1st**	62	26	19	5	2	59	25	Semi finals		Champions League	Quarter-finals	Sebastián Soria	13	
2015–16	QSL	4th	44	26	14	2	10	60	41	**Winner**		Champions League	Round of 16			
2016–17	QSL	**1st**	63	26	19	6	1	79	33	Semi finals		Champions League	Round of 16	**Youssef El-Arabi**	27	
2017–18	QSL	**1st**	60	22	19	3	0	86	27	**Winner**	**Winner**	Champions League	Quarter-finals	Youssef El-Arabi	33	
2017–18	QSL	**1st**	60	22	19	3	0	86	27	**Winner**	Runner-up	Champions League	Quarter-finals	Youssef El-Arabi	33	
2018–19	QSL	2nd	50	22	15	5	2	52	17	**Winner**	Runner-up	Champions League	Round of 16	Youssef El-Arabi	31	
2019–20 (Note: The league was halted on 16 March 2020 due to COVID-19 pandemic in Qatar, then later resumed on 24 July 2020.)	QSL	**1st**	52	22	16	4	2	38	16	Semi-finals	Runner-up; Runner-up	Champions League (Note: On 9 July 2020, AFC announced new schedule for 2020 AFC Champions League group stage. On 16 July 2020, AFC announced that Qatar would host 2020 AFC Champions League in the West region from the group stage to the semi-finals. On 27 July 2020, AFC confirmed that Malaysia would host matches of Group G and H.)	Group stage	Almoez Ali	11	
2020–21	QSL	2nd	47	22	15	2	5	53	25	Semi-finals	Runner-up	Champions League (Note: On 11 March 2021, AFC confirmed the hosts for the group stage, except for Group H and I whose hosts will be decided at a later date. On 10 May 2021, AFC confirmed the hosts for Group H and I.)	Group stage	Michael Olunga	20	
2020–21	QSL	2nd	47	22	15	2	5	53	25	Semi-finals	Runner-up	FIFA Club World Cup	Fifth place	Michael Olunga	20	
2021–22	QSL											Champions League		Michael Olunga	23	

- Note 1: The first official Qatari Football League season was held in 1972–73.

== Honours ==
=== National ===
Competition	Titles	Winning years or seasons
Qatar Stars League	7	2010–11, 2011–12, 2013–14, 2014–15, 2016–17, 2017–18, 2019–20
Emir of Qatar Cup	3	2016, 2018, 2019
Qatar Cup (ex) Crown Prince Cup	3	2013, 2015, 2018
Sheikh Jassim Cup	2	2015, 2016
