= Luiz Júnior (footballer, born 1989) =

Qatari footballer

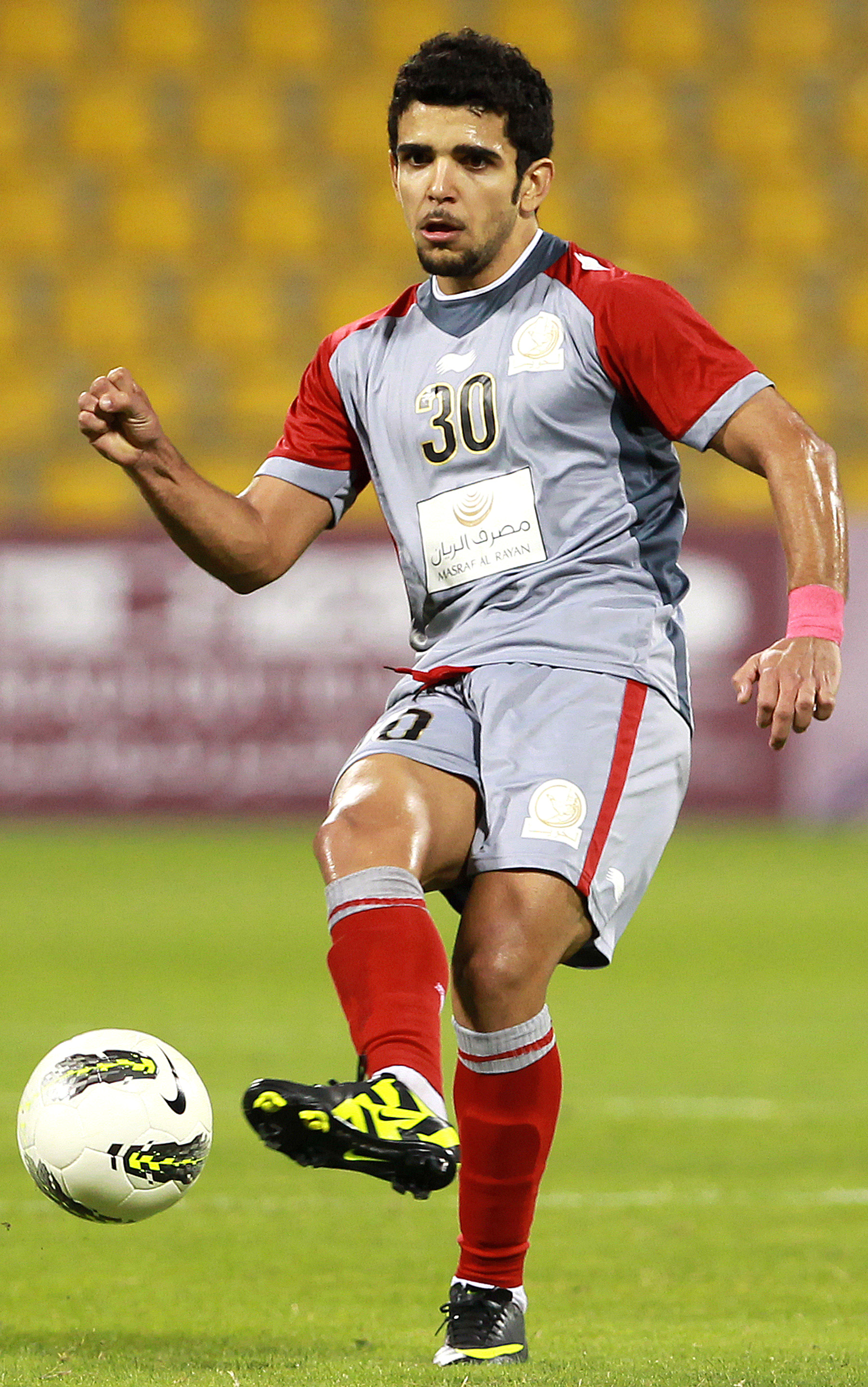
- Luiz Júnior playing for Lekhwiya in 2011

Personal information
- Full name: Luiz Mairton Carlos Júnior
- Date of birth: 13 January 1989 (age 37)
- Place of birth: Jaguaruana, Brazil
- Height: 1.77 m (5 ft 10 in)
- Position: Defensive midfielder

Team information
- Current team: Al-Duhail
- Number: 15

Senior career*
Years	Team	Apps	(Gls)
2009–2010	Atlético Cearense	0	(0)
2010–2024	Al-Duhail	228	(10)
2024–2025	Al-Arabi	14	(0)
2025–	Al-Duhail	6	(0)

International career^{‡}
2013–2017	Qatar	26	(0)
- * Club domestic league appearances and goals as of 17 January 2026 ‡ National team caps and goals as of 23 March 2017

Luiz Mairton Carlos Júnior (born 13 January 1989), commonly known as Luiz Júnior or Luiz Ceará, is a footballer who plays as a defensive midfielder for Al-Duhail in the Qatar Stars League. Born in Brazil, he played for the Qatar national team.

He won the Qatar Stars League eight times with his club Al-Duhail.

== International career ==
Luiz was called up the Qatar team on 13 November 2013 by former coach Djamel Belmadi. He made his official debut for the team on 25 December in the 2014 WAFF Championship in a 1–0 win against Palestine.

== Honours ==
=== Club ===
Al-Duhail

- Qatar Stars League: 2010-11, 2011-12, 2013-14, 2014-15, 2016-17, 2017-18, 2019-20, 2022-23
- Emir of Qatar Cup: 2016, 2018, 2019, 2022
- Qatar Cup: 2013, 2015, 2018, 2023
- Sheikh Jassim Cup: 2015, 2016
- Qatari Stars Cup: 2022-23
