= Hazem Shehata =

Qatari footballer (born 1998)

Personal information
- Full name: Hazem Ahmed Shehata
- Date of birth: 2 February 1998 (age 28)
- Place of birth: Cairo, Egypt
- Height: 1.77 m (5 ft 10 in)
- Position: Left-back

Team information
- Current team: Al-Rayyan
- Number: 3

Senior career*
Years	Team	Apps	(Gls)
2016–2021	Al-Duhail	14	(0)
2019–2020	→ Umm Salal (loan)	8	(0)
2020–2021	→ Al Ahli (loan)	25	(2)
2021–2024	Al-Wakrah	41	(4)
2024–	Al-Rayyan	3	(1)

International career^{‡}
2018	Qatar U23	4	(1)
2017–	Qatar	11	(1)
- * Club domestic league appearances and goals as of 19:20, 27 December 2023 (UTC) ‡ National team caps and goals as of 19:20, 27 December 2023 (UTC)

Hazem Ahmed Shehata (born 2 February 1998), is a professional footballer who plays as a left-back for Qatar Stars League side Al-Rayyan. Born in Egypt, he represents Qatar at international level.

== Club career ==
Shehata began his professional career with Al-Duhail in 2016. Between 2019 and 2021, he was loaned to Umm Salal and Al-Ahli. In August 2021, he joined Al-Wakrah.

== International goals ==
=== Qatar U23 ===
No.	Date	Venue	Opponent	Score	Result	Competition
1.	14 August 2018	Pakansari Stadium, Cibinong, Indonesia	Thailand	1–0	1–1	2018 Asian Games

=== Qatar ===
No.	Date	Venue	Opponent	Score	Result	Competition
1.	2 July 2023	Levi's Stadium, Santa Clara, United States	Mexico	1–0	1–0	2023 CONCACAF Gold Cup

== Honours ==
Al-Duhail

- Qatar Stars League: 2016-17, 2017-18
- Sheikh Jassim Cup: 2015, 2016
- Emir of Qatar Cup: 2016, 2018, 2019
- Qatar Cup: 2018
