= Mohammed Musa =

Qatari footballer (born 1986)

Mohammed Mousa
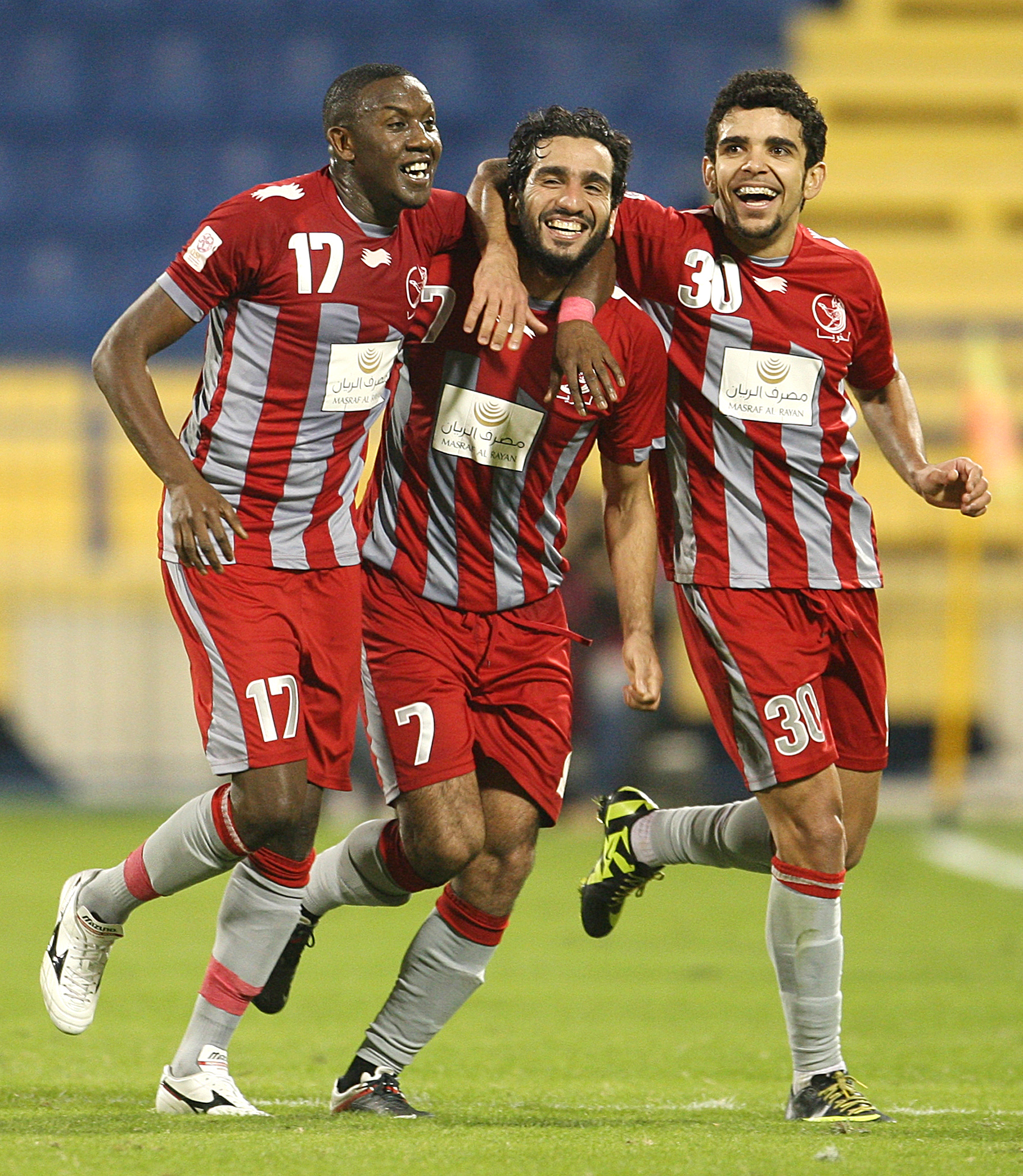
- Musa (left) celebrating a goal with Adel Lamy and Luiz Júnior (2011)

Personal information
- Full name: Mohamed Mousa Abbas Ali
- Date of birth: March 23, 1986 (age 40)
- Place of birth: Umm Bab, Qatar
- Height: 1.81 m (5 ft 11 in)
- Position: Defender

Senior career*
Years	Team	Apps	(Gls)
2007–2010	Umm Salal	26	(1)
2010	→ Al Sadd (loan)	5	(0)
2010–2024	Al-Duhail	235	(10)
2024–2026	Al-Shamal	24	(0)

International career^{‡}
2010	Qatar U23	3	(0)
2008–2019	Qatar	58	(5)
- * Club domestic league appearances and goals as of 27 July 2023 ‡ National team caps and goals as of 27 July 2023

Mohamed Mousa Abbas Ali (Arabic: محمد موسى; born on March 23, 1986) is a Qatari footballer who currently plays .

== Club career ==
Musa began his professional career with Umm Salal in 2007. In 2010 he was loaned to Al-Sadd from January to June. In July 2010 he joined Al-Duhail.

== Club career statistics ==
Statistics accurate as of 13 January 2023

Club	Season	League	League		Cup^{1}		League Cup^{2}		AFC Champions League^{3}		Total	
Club	Season	League	Apps	Goals	Apps	Goals	Apps	Goals	Apps	Goals	Apps	Goals
Umm-Salal	2006–07	QSL	0	0								
Umm-Salal	2007–08	QSL	2	1								
Umm-Salal	2008–09	QSL	19	0					5	0		
Umm-Salal	2009–10	QSL	5	0					3	0		
Umm-Salal	Total		26	1					8	0		
Al-Sadd	2009–10	QSL	5	0					0	0		
Al-Sadd	Total		5	0					0	0		
Lekhwiya	2010–11	QSL	10	0								
Lekhwiya	2011–12	QSL	19	0								
Lekhwiya	2012–13	QSL	16	0						1		
Lekhwiya	2013–14	QSL	26	2								
Lekhwiya	2014–15	QSL	17	0								
Lekhwiya	2015–16	QSL	24	1								
Lekhwiya	2016–17	QSL	24	2						1		
Lekhwiya	2017–18	QSL	18	2								
Lekhwiya	2018–19	QSL	20	1								
Lekhwiya	2019–20	QSL	17	0								
Lekhwiya	2020–21	QSL	15	1	3	0						
Lekhwiya	2021–22	QSL	13	1	4	0						
Lekhwiya	2022–23	QSL	5	0								
Lekhwiya	Total		224	10					72	2		
Career total			255	11					80	2		

^{1}Includes Emir of Qatar Cup.

^{2}Includes Sheikh Jassem Cup.

^{3}Includes FIFA Club World Cup.

== International career ==
On November 5, 2010, the defender earned a call-up for the Qatar national under-23 football team, for the Asian Games.

=== International goals ===
Scores and results list Qatar's goal tally first.

No	Date	Venue	Opponent	Score	Result	Competition
1.	28 August 2015	Jassim Bin Hamad Stadium, Doha, Qatar	Singapore	1–0	4–0	Friendly
2.	3 September 2015	Jassim Bin Hamad Stadium, Doha, Qatar	Bhutan	1–0	15–0	2018 FIFA World Cup qualification
3.	3 September 2015	Jassim Bin Hamad Stadium, Doha, Qatar	Bhutan	5–0	15–0	2018 FIFA World Cup qualification
4.	8 September 2015	Mong Kok Stadium, Mong Kok, Hong Kong	Hong Kong	3–0	3–2	2018 FIFA World Cup qualification
5.	13 October 2015	Jassim Bin Hamad Stadium, Doha, Qatar	Maldives	4–0	4–0	2018 FIFA World Cup qualification

== Honours ==
Al-Duhail

- Qatar Stars League: 2011–12, 2013–14, 2014–15, 2016–17, 2017–18, 2019–20, 2022–23
- Qatari Stars Cup: 2010–11, 2022–23
- Emir of Qatar Cup: 2016, 2018, 2019, 2022
- Qatar Cup: 2013, 2015, 2018, 2023
- Sheikh Jassim Cup, 2015, 2016

Qatar

- WAFF Championship: 2014
- Arabian Gulf Cup: 2014
