= Al-Duhail SC in international football =

Football club

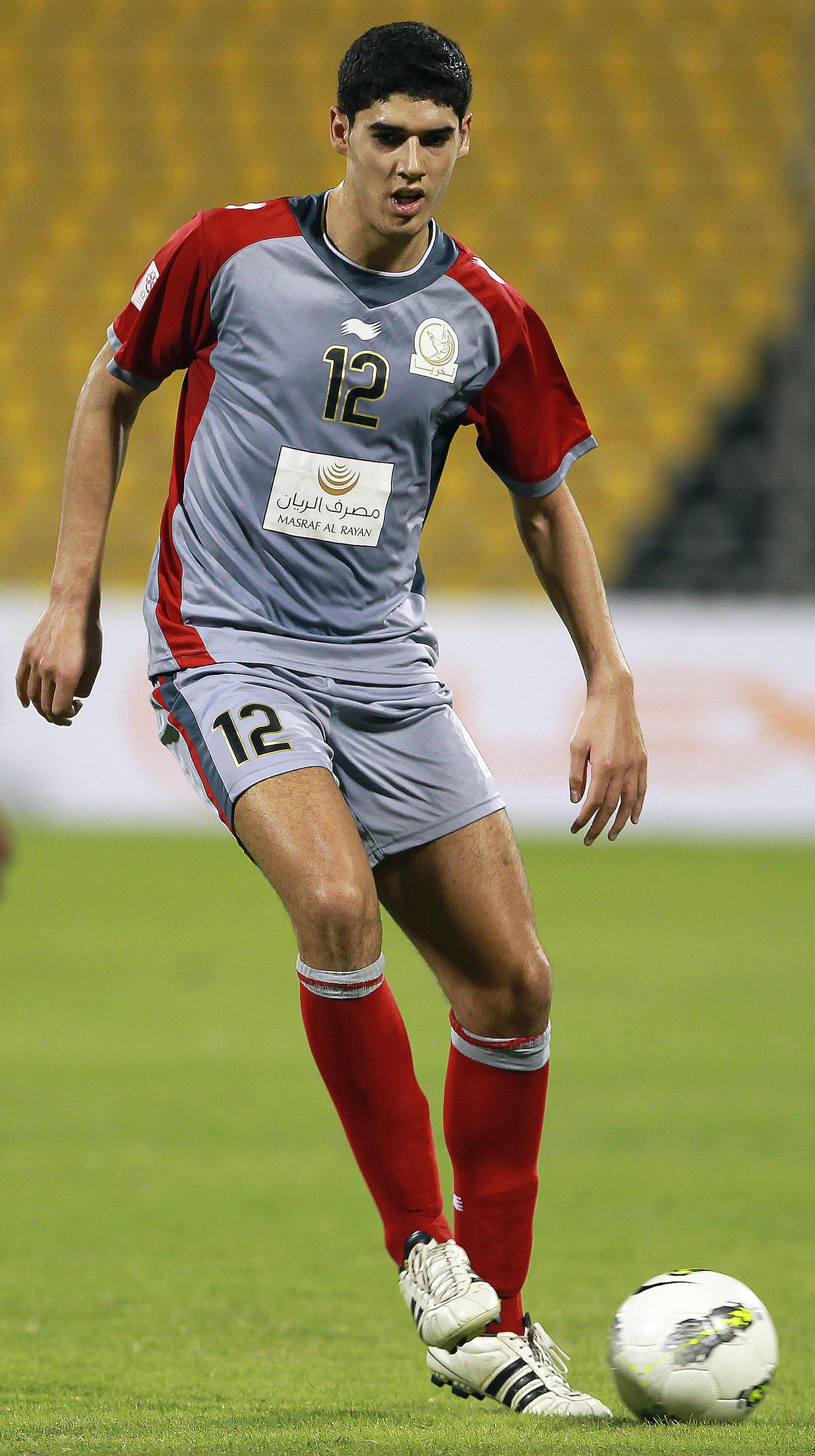
- Karim Boudiaf is the Al-Duhail SC player with the highest match tally in international competitions, with 73 matches.
- Club: Al-Duhail SC
- Most appearances: Karim Boudiaf (79)
- Top scorer: El-Arabi & Msakni (16)
- First entry: 2012 AFC Champions League
- Latest entry: 2022 AFC Champions League

Al-Duhail SC, a Qatari professional association football club, has gained entry to Asian Football Confederation (AFC) competitions on several occasions. They have represented Qatar in the Champions League on ten occasions and FIFA Club World Cup on one occasion.

== History ==
Al-Duhail SC whose team has regularly taken part in Asian Football Confederation (AFC) competitions. Qualification for Qatari clubs is determined by a team's performance in its domestic league and Emir of Qatar Cup competitions, Al-Duhail have regularly qualified for the primary Asian competition, the AFC Champions League, by winning the Qatar Stars League or runners–up. Their first participation in the AFC Champions League was in 2012, and their first match was against Al-Ahli of Saudi Arabia and ended with victory despite that Al-Duhail was eliminated from the group stage. The following year Al-Duhail achieved a historic participation as it reached the quarter-finals and was eliminated against Guangzhou Evergrande which won the title afterwards. In 2018 in the group stage, Al-Duhail achieved the full mark and won all his matches, except for one defeat in ten matches. and for the third time in its history Al-Duhail reached the quarter-finals and eliminated against Persepolis.

In 2020 after playing two matches the competition was suspended due to the COVID-19 pandemic in Asia and after seven months it was decided to complete the competition, but behind closed doors and grouped in one country which is Qatar for West Asian groups. Al-Duhail SC as the holder of the 2019–20 Qatar Stars League title, was included in participating in the FIFA Club World Cup and the first match was expected against Auckland City but the latter withdrew due to the COVID-19 pandemic and related quarantine measures required by the New Zealand authorities, and in the second round it was defeated against Al Ahly, so that Al-Duhail SC was finished fifth place by defeating Asian champion Ulsan Hyundai. In 2021 and due to the continued spread of the COVID-19 pandemic in Asia, it was decided to establish each group in a country, and Al-Duhail group in Saudi Arabia. for the second time in a row Al-Duhail was eliminated from the group stage. On April 21, 2021, Michael Olunga scored Al-Duhail's first hat-trick in the AFC Champions League against Esteghlal in a victory 4–3.

== AFC competitions ==
Al-Duhail SC results in AFC Champions League
Season	Round	Opposition	Home	Away	Aggregate	Ref.
2012	Group stage	(Saudi Arabia) Al-Ahli	1–0	0–3	4th place	
2012	Group stage	(United Arab Emirates) Al-Nasr	1–2	1–2	4th place	
2012	Group stage	(Iran) Sepahan	1–0	1–2	4th place	
2013	Group stage	(United Arab Emirates) Al-Shabab Al-Arabi	2–1	1–3	1st place	
2013	Group stage	(Saudi Arabia) Al-Ettifaq	2–0	0–0	1st place	
2013	Group stage	(Uzbekistan) Pakhtakor	3–1	2–2	1st place	
2013	Round of 16	(Saudi Arabia) Al-Hilal	2–2	1–0	3–2	
2013	Quarter-finals	(China) Guangzhou Evergrande	1–4	0–2	1–6	
2014	Round 2	(Bahrain) Al-Hidd	2–1	Single match		
2014	Round 3	Al-Kuwait	4–1	Single match		
2014	Group stage	(United Arab Emirates) Al-Ain	0–5	1–2	3rd place	
2014	Group stage	(Iran) Tractor Sazi	0–0	1–0	3rd place	
2014	Group stage	(Saudi Arabia) Al-Ittihad	2–0	1–3	3rd place	
2015	Group stage	(Iran) Persepolis	3–0	0–3	1st place	
2015	Group stage	(Saudi Arabia) Al-Nassr	1–1	3–1	1st place	
2015	Group stage	(Uzbekistan) Bunyodkor	1–0	1–0	1st place	
2015	Round of 16	(Qatar) Al Sadd SC	2–2	2–1	4–3	
2015	Quarter-finals	(Saudi Arabia) Al-Hilal	2–2	1–4	3–6	
2016	Group stage	(Iran) Zob Ahan	0–1	0–0	2nd place	
2016	Group stage	(Saudi Arabia) Al-Nassr	4–0	1–1	2nd place	
2016	Group stage	(Uzbekistan) Bunyodkor	0–0	2–0	2nd place	
2016	Round of 16	(Qatar) El Jaish	0–4	4–2	4–6	
2017	Group stage	(United Arab Emirates) Al-Jazira	3–0	3–1	1st place	
2017	Group stage	(Saudi Arabia) Al-Fateh	4–1	2–2	1st place	
2017	Group stage	(Iran) Esteghlal Khuzestan	2–1	1–1	1st place	
2017	Round of 16	(Iran) Persepolis	0–0	0–1	0–1	
2018	Group stage	(Iran) Zob Ahan	3–1	1–0	1st place	
2018	Group stage	(United Arab Emirates) Al-Wahda	1–0	3–2	1st place	
2018	Group stage	(Uzbekistan) Lokomotiv Tashkent	3–2	2–1	1st place	
2018	Round of 16	(United Arab Emirates) Al-Ain	4–1	4–2	8–3	
2018	Quarter-finals	(Iran) Persepolis	1–0	1–3	2–3	
2019	Group stage	(Iran) Esteghlal	3–0	1–1	2nd place	
2019	Group stage	(Saudi Arabia) Al-Hilal	2–2	1–3	2nd place	
2019	Group stage	(United Arab Emirates) Al-Ain	2–2	2–0	2nd place	
2019	Round of 16	(Qatar) Al Sadd SC	1–1	1–3	2–4	
2020 (Note: On 9 July 2020, AFC announced new schedule for 2020 AFC Champions League group stage. On 16 July 2020, AFC announced that Qatar would host 2020 AFC Champions League in the West region from the group stage to the semi-finals. On 27 July 2020, AFC confirmed that Malaysia would host matches of Group G and H.)	Group stage	(Iran) Persepolis	2–0	1–0	3rd place	
2020	Group stage	(Saudi Arabia) Al-Taawoun	0–1	0–2	3rd place	
2020	Group stage	(United Arab Emirates) Sharjah	2–1	2–4	3rd place	
2021 (Note: On 11 March 2021, AFC confirmed the hosts for the group stage, except for Group H and I whose hosts will be decided at a later date. On 10 May 2021, AFC confirmed the hosts for Group H and I.)	Group stage	(Iraq) Al-Shorta	2–0	1–2	2nd place	
2021	Group stage	(Saudi Arabia) Al-Ahli	1–1	1–1	2nd place	
2021	Group stage	(Iran) Esteghlal	4–3	2–2	2nd place	
2022	Group stage	(Saudi Arabia) Al-Taawoun	1–2	4–3	1st place	
2022	Group stage	(Iran) Sepahan	5–2	1–0	1st place	
2022	Group stage	(Uzbekistan) Pakhtakor	3–2	3–0	1st place	
2022	Round of 16	(Qatar) Al-Rayyan	–	–	–	

== Other competitions ==
=== FIFA Club World Cup ===
1 February 2021 First round	Al-Duhail (Qatar)	3–0; Awarded (Note: The Al-Duhail v Auckland City match was awarded as a 3–0 win to Al-Duhail after Auckland City withdrew due to the COVID-19 pandemic and related quarantine measures required by the New Zealand authorities.)	(New Zealand) Auckland City	Al Rayyan
20:30		Report		Stadium: Ahmed bin Ali Stadium

4 February 2021 Second round	Al-Duhail (Qatar)	0–1	(Egypt) Al Ahly	Al Rayyan
20:30		Report	El Shahat 30'	Stadium: Education City Stadium; Referee: Mario Escobar (Guatemala)

7 February 2021 Fifth place	Ulsan Hyundai (South Korea)	1–3	(Qatar) Al-Duhail	Al Rayyan
18:00	Yoon Bit-garam 62'	Report	Edmilson 21'; Muntari 66'; Ali 82'	Stadium: Ahmed bin Ali Stadium; Attendance: 920; Referee: Edina Alves Batista (Brazil)

== Statistics ==
=== By season ===
Information correct as of 26 April 2022.
Key

- Pld = Played
- W = Games won
- D = Games drawn
- L = Games lost
- F = Goals for
- A = Goals against
- Grp = Group stage
- PR = Preliminary round
- R1 = First round
- R2 = Second round
- PO = Play-off round
- R16 = Round of 16
- QF = Quarter-final
- SF = Semi-final

Key to colours and symbols:

W	Winners
RU	Runners-up

Al-Duhail SC record in Asian football by season
Season	Competition	Pld	W	D	L	GF	GA	GD	Round
2012	Champions League	6	2	0	4	5	9	−4	Grp
2013	Champions League	10	4	3	3	14	15	−1	QF
2014	Champions League	8	4	1	3	11	12	−1	Grp
2015	Champions League	10	5	3	2	16	14	+2	QF
2016	Champions League	8	3	3	2	11	8	+3	R16
2017	Champions League	8	4	3	1	15	7	+8	R16
2018	Champions League	10	9	0	1	23	12	+11	QF
2019	Champions League	8	2	4	2	13	12	+1	R16
2020	Champions League	6	3	0	3	7	8	−1	Grp
2020	FIFA Club World Cup	3	2	0	1	3	2	+1	5th
2021	Champions League	6	2	3	1	11	9	+2	Grp
2022	Champions League	6	5	0	1	17	9	+8	
Total		89	45	20	24	146	117	+29	

=== Overall record ===
==== In Asia ====
As of 26 April 2022:

AFC competitions
Competition	Seasons	Played	Won	Drawn	Lost	Goals For	Goals Against	Last season played
Champions League	11	86	43	18	23	143	115	2022
FIFA Club World Cup	1	3	1	0	1	3	2	2020
Total	12	89	45	20	24	146	117	

== Statistics by country ==
Statistics correct as of game against Sepahan on April 26, 2022

Country	Club	P	W	D	L	GF	GA	GD
Bahrain	Hidd SCC	1	1	0	0	2	1	+1
Subtotal		1	1	0	0	2	1	+1
China PR	Guangzhou Evergrande	2	0	0	2	1	6	−5
Subtotal		2	0	0	2	1	6	−5
Iran	Persepolis	8	4	1	3	8	7	+1
Iran	Sepahan	4	3	0	1	8	4	+4
Iran	Tractor Sazi	2	1	1	0	1	0	+1
Iran	Zob Ahan	4	2	1	1	4	2	+2
Iran	Esteghlal Khuzestan	2	1	1	0	3	2	+1
Iran	Esteghlal	4	2	2	0	10	6	+4
Subtotal		24	13	6	5	34	21	+13
Iraq	Al-Shorta	2	1	0	1	3	2	+1
Subtotal		2	1	0	1	3	2	+1
Kuwait	Al Kuwait	1	1	0	0	4	1	+3
Subtotal		1	1	0	0	4	1	+3
Qatar	Al Sadd SC	4	1	2	1	6	7	−1
Qatar	El Jaish	2	1	0	1	4	6	−2
Subtotal		6	2	2	2	10	13	−3
Saudi Arabia	Al-Ittifaq	2	1	1	0	2	0	+2
Saudi Arabia	Al Ittihad	2	1	0	1	3	3	+0
Saudi Arabia	Al-Hilal	6	1	3	2	9	13	−4
Saudi Arabia	Al-Taawoun	4	1	0	3	5	8	−3
Saudi Arabia	Al-Ahli	4	1	2	1	3	5	−2
Saudi Arabia	Al-Nassr	4	2	2	0	9	3	+6
Saudi Arabia	Al-Fateh	2	1	1	0	6	3	+3
Subtotal		24	8	9	7	37	35	+2
United Arab Emirates	Al-Wahda	2	2	0	0	4	2	+2
United Arab Emirates	Al-Ain	6	3	1	2	13	12	+1
United Arab Emirates	Sharjah	2	1	0	1	4	5	−1
United Arab Emirates	Al-Jazira	2	2	0	0	6	1	+5
United Arab Emirates	Al-Nasr	2	0	0	2	2	4	−2
United Arab Emirates	Al-Shabab Al-Arabi	2	1	0	1	3	4	−1
Subtotal		16	9	1	6	32	28	+4
Uzbekistan	Bunyodkor	4	3	1	0	4	0	+4
Uzbekistan	Pakhtakor	4	3	1	0	11	5	+6
Uzbekistan	Lokomotiv Tashkent	2	2	0	0	5	3	+2
Subtotal		10	8	2	0	20	8	+12
Total		86	43	18	23	143	115	+28

== Asian competitions goals ==
Statistics correct as of game against Sepahan on April 26, 2022

P	Player	TOTAL	ACL	FCWC
1	(Morocco) Youssef El-Arabi	16	16	–
=	(Tunisia) Youssef Msakni	16	16	–
3	(Kenya) Michael Olunga	13	13	–
=	(Belgium) Edmilson Junior	13	12	1
5	(South Korea) Nam Tae-Hee	12	12	–
6	(Qatar) Almoez Ali	10	9	1
7	(Qatar) Sebastián Soria	8	8	–
=	(Qatar) Ismaeel Mohammad	8	8	–
=	(Qatar) Karim Boudiaf	8	8	–
10	(Qatar) Ali Afif	4	4	–
11	(Slovakia) Vladimír Weiss	3	3	–
=	(Spain) Chico Flores	3	3	–
=	(Democratic Republic of the Congo) Dioko Kaluyituka	3	3	–
=	(Qatar) Mohammed Muntari	3	2	1
15	(Qatar) Abdullah Al-Ahrak	2	2	–
=	(Senegal) Issiar Dia	2	2	–
=	(Qatar) Luiz Ceará	2	2	–
=	(Qatar) Mohammed Musa	2	2	–
18	(Burkina Faso) Moumouni Dagano	1	1	–
=	(Qatar) Khalid Muftah	1	1	–
=	(Qatar) Adel Lami	1	1	–
=	(Algeria) Madjid Bougherra	1	1	–
=	(Ivory Coast) Bakari Koné	1	1	–
=	(Ivory Coast) Lassina Diaby	1	1	–

P	Player	TOTAL	ACL	FCWC
=	(Qatar) Abdurahman Mostafa	1	1	–
=	(Qatar) Khalid Muneer	1	1	–
=	(Morocco) Medhi Benatia	1	1	–
=	(Japan) Shoya Nakajima	1	1	–
=	(Croatia) Mario Mandžukić	1	1	–
=	(Iran) Ramin Rezaeian	1	1	–
=	(Tunisia) Ferjani Sassi	1	1	–
=	(Qatar) Bassam Al-Rawi	1	1	–
=	Own Goals	3	3	–
Totals		145	142	3

=== Hat-tricks ===
N	Date	Player	Match	Score	Time of goals
1	21 April 2021	Michael Olunga	Al-Duhail SC – Esteghlal	4–3	10', 27', 85'
2	14 April 2022	Edmilson Junior	Al-Duhail – Pakhtakor	3–2	66', 71', 84'

=== Two goals one match ===
N	Date	Player	Match	Score
1	3 April 2013	Sebastián Soria	Lekhwiya – Pakhtakor	3–1
2	25 May 2016	Ismaeel Mohammad	El Jaish – Lekhwiya	2–4
3	20 February 2017	Youssef El-Arabi	Lekhwiya – Al-Jazira	3–0
4	25 April 2017	Nam Tae-hee	Al-Jazira – Lekhwiya	1–3
5	12 February 2018	Karim Boudiaf	Al-Duhail – Zob Ahan	3–1
6	19 February 2018	Youssef El-Arabi	Al-Wahda – Al-Duhail	2–3
7	6 March 2018	Youssef El-Arabi	Al-Duhail – Lokomotiv Tashkent	3–2

N	Date	Player	Match	Score
8	12 March 2018	Youssef El-Arabi	Lokomotiv Tashkent – Al-Duhail	1–2
9	15 May 2018	Youssef El-Arabi	Al-Duhail – Al-Ain	4–1
10	24 April 2021	Michael Olunga	Esteghlal – Al-Duhail	2–2
11	22 April 2022	Edmilson Junior	Al-Taawoun – Al-Duhail	3–4
12	26 April 2022	Michael Olunga	Al-Duhail – Sepahan	5–2
13	26 April 2022	Edmilson Junior	Al-Duhail – Sepahan	5–2

== List of all-time appearances ==
This list of all-time appearances for Al-Duhail in Asian competitions contains football players who have played for Al-Duhail in international football competitions and have managed to accrue 20 or more appearances.

Gold Still playing competitive football in Al-Duhail. Statistics correct as of game against Sepahan on April 26, 2022.

#	Name	Position	ACL	FCWC	TOTAL	Date of first cap	Debut against	Date of last cap	Final match against
=	(Qatar) Karim Boudiaf	DM	78	1	79	7 Mar 2012	Al-Ahli	—	—
=	(Qatar) Mohammed Musa	CB	71	1	72	7 Mar 2012	Al-Ahli	—	—
=	(Qatar) Luiz Ceará	DM	71	1	72	7 Mar 2012	Al-Ahli	—	—
=	(Qatar) Ismaeel Mohammad	RW	64	2	66	15 May 2012	Al-Nasr	—	—
=	(South Korea) Nam Tae-Hee	AM	62	–	62	7 Mar 2012	Al-Ahli	—	—
=	(Qatar) Ali Afif	LW	47	1	48	21 Mar 2012	Al-Nasr	—	—
=	(Tunisia) Youssef Msakni	LW / AM	45	–	45	12 Mar 2013	Al-Ettifaq	13 Aug 2019	Al Sadd SC
=	(Qatar) Almoez Ali	ST	39	2	41	20 Feb 2017	Al-Jazira	—	—
=	(Belgium) Edmilson Junior	LW	26	2	28	28 Aug 2018	Persepolis	—	—
=	(Qatar) Mohammed Muntari	ST	20	2	22	25 Aug 2015	Al-Hilal	—	—
=	(Algeria) Madjid Bougherra	CB	21	–	21	7 Mar 2012	Al-Ahli	22 Apr 2014	Tractor Sazi
