= Sultan Al-Brake =

Qatari footballer (born 1996)

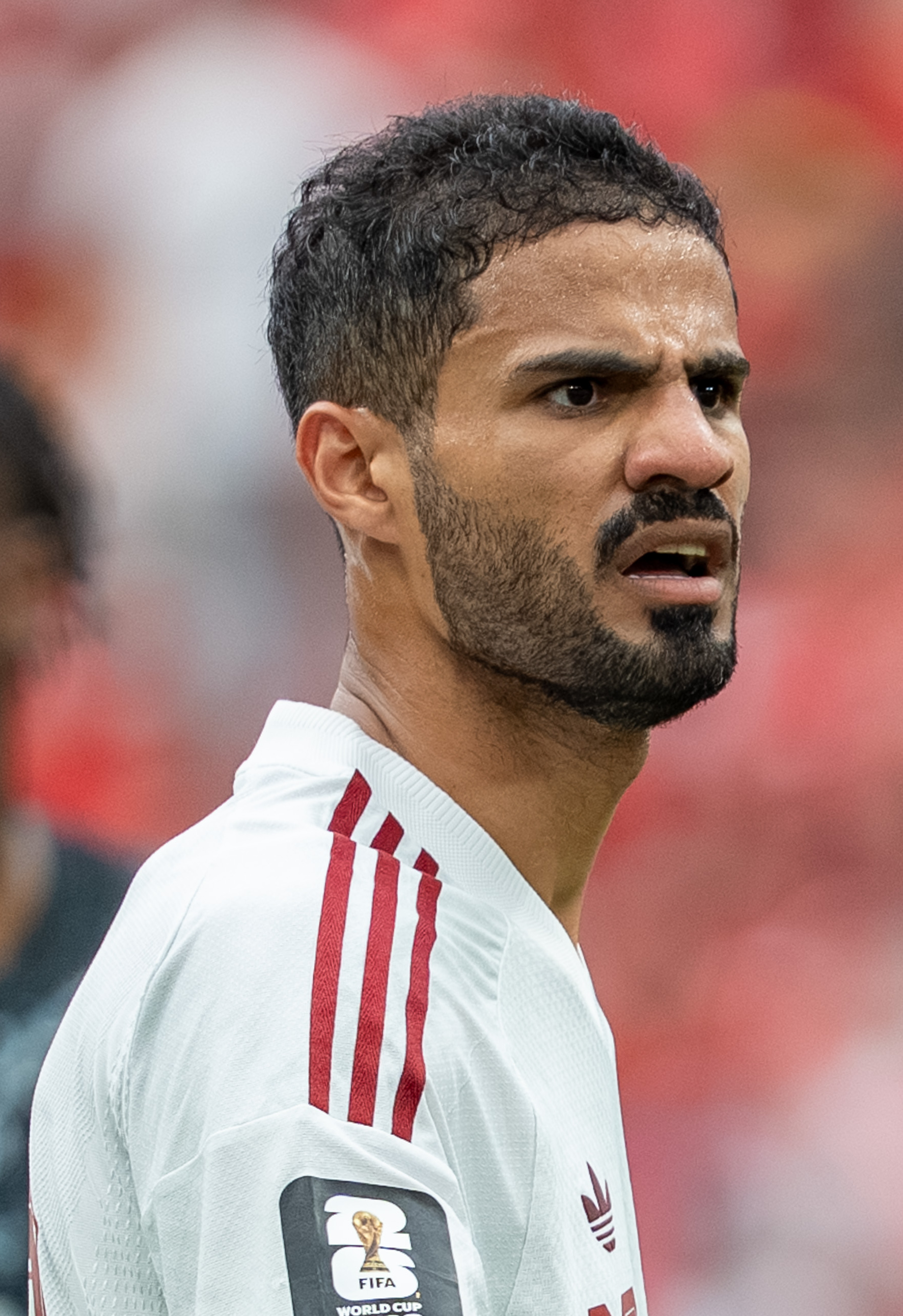
- Al-Brake with Qatar in 2026

Personal information
- Full name: Sultan Hussain Al-Brake
- Date of birth: 7 April 1996 (age 30)
- Place of birth: Doha, Qatar
- Height: 1.75 m (5 ft 9 in)
- Position: Left-back

Team information
- Current team: Al-Duhail
- Number: 18

Youth career
- Aspire Academy

Senior career*
Years	Team	Apps	(Gls)
2015–2018	Al-Wakra	14	(0)
2015–2016	→ Leonesa (loan)	16	(0)
2017–2018	→ Al-Duhail (loan)	4	(0)
2018–	Al-Duhail	118	(4)

International career^{‡}
2014–2015	Qatar U20	5	(0)
2015–2018	Qatar U23	13	(0)
2018–	Qatar	8	(0)
Medal record
Representing Qatar
Men's Football
AFC Asian Cup
Winner	2023 Qatar
- * Club domestic league appearances and goals as of 17 January 2026 ‡ National team caps and goals as of 16 November 2024

Sultan Hussain Al-Brake (Arabic: سلطان البريكي; born 7 April 1996) is a Qatari professional footballer who plays as a left-back for Qatari club Al-Duhail and the Qatar national team.

Al-Brake was part of the Qatar squad that won the 2023 AFC Asian Cup.

== Club career ==
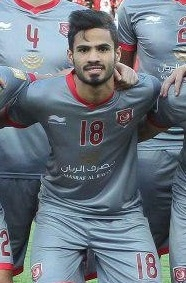
Al-Brake with Al Duhail in 2018

Al-Brake began his professional career with Al-Wakrah in 2015. He was loaned out to Spanish club Cultural Leonesa in November 2015 and to Al-Duhail in 2017. In 2018 he joined Al-Duhail.

== International career ==
At the 2023 AFC Asian Cup, Al-Brake was a member of Qatar's squad which won the tournament on home soil. He made two appearances at the tournament, starting their third group match against China and coming off the bench in extra time of Qatar's quarter-final against Uzbekistan, where he scored a penalty in the shootout.

At the 2025 FIFA Arab Cup, Al-Brake started in Qatar's opening match against Palestine, where he scored an own-goal in the 95th minute to lose 1–0.

== Honours ==
Al-Duhail

- Qatar Stars League: 2017-18, 2019-20, 2022-23
- Emir of Qatar Cup: 2018, 2019, 2022
- Qatar Cup: 2018, 2023
- Qatari Stars Cup: 2022-23

Qatar

- AFC Asian Cup: 2023
