= Ismaeel Mohammad =

Qatari footballer (born 1990)

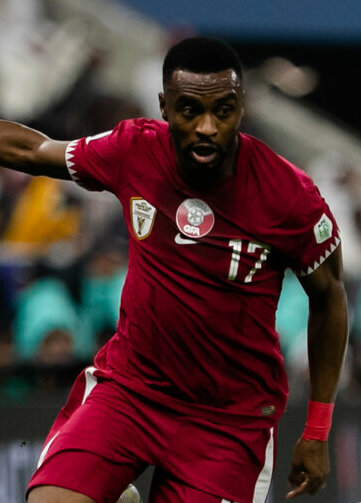
- Mohammad playing for Qatar at the 2023 AFC Asian Cup

Personal information
- Full name: Ismaeel Mohammad Mohammad
- Date of birth: 5 April 1990 (age 36)
- Place of birth: Doha, Qatar
- Height: 1.72 m (5 ft 8 in)
- Position: Winger

Team information
- Current team: Al-Duhail
- Number: 7

Senior career*
Years	Team	Apps	(Gls)
2009–2011	El Jaish		
2011–	Al-Duhail	257	(40)

International career^{‡}
2013–	Qatar	90	(4)
Medal record
Men's football
Representing Qatar
AFC Asian Cup
Winner	2023 Qatar
- * Club domestic league appearances and goals as of 17 January 2026 ‡ National team caps and goals as of 24 December 2024

Ismaeel Mohammad Mohammad (Arabic: إِسْمَاعِيل مُحَمَّد مُحَمَّد; born 5 April 1990) is a Qatari professional footballer who plays as a winger for Al-Duhail in the Qatar Stars League and the Qatar national football team.

== International career ==
=== International goals ===
Scores and results list Qatar's goal tally first.

Goal	Date	Venue	Opponent	Score	Result	Competition
1.	27 December 2014	Abdullah bin Khalifa Stadium, Doha, Qatar	Estonia	3–0	3–0	Friendly
2.	28 August 2015	Jassim Bin Hamad Stadium, Doha, Qatar	Singapore	4–0	4–0	Friendly
3.	3 September 2015	Jassim Bin Hamad Stadium, Doha, Qatar	Bhutan	14–0	15–0	2018 FIFA World Cup qualification
4.	21 March 2018	Basra Sports City, Basra, Iraq	Iraq	3–1	3–2	2018 International Friendship Championship

== Honours ==
Al-Duhail

- Qatar Stars League: 2011–12, 2013–14, 2014–15, 2016–17, 2017–18, 2019–20
- Qatar Cup: 2013, 2015, 2018
- Sheikh Jassim Cup: 2015, 2016
- Emir of Qatar Cup: 2016, 2018, 2019, 2022

Qatar

- WAFF Championship: 2014
- Arabian Gulf Cup: 2014
- AFC Asian Cup: 2023
