= Salah Zakaria =

Qatari footballer (born 1999)

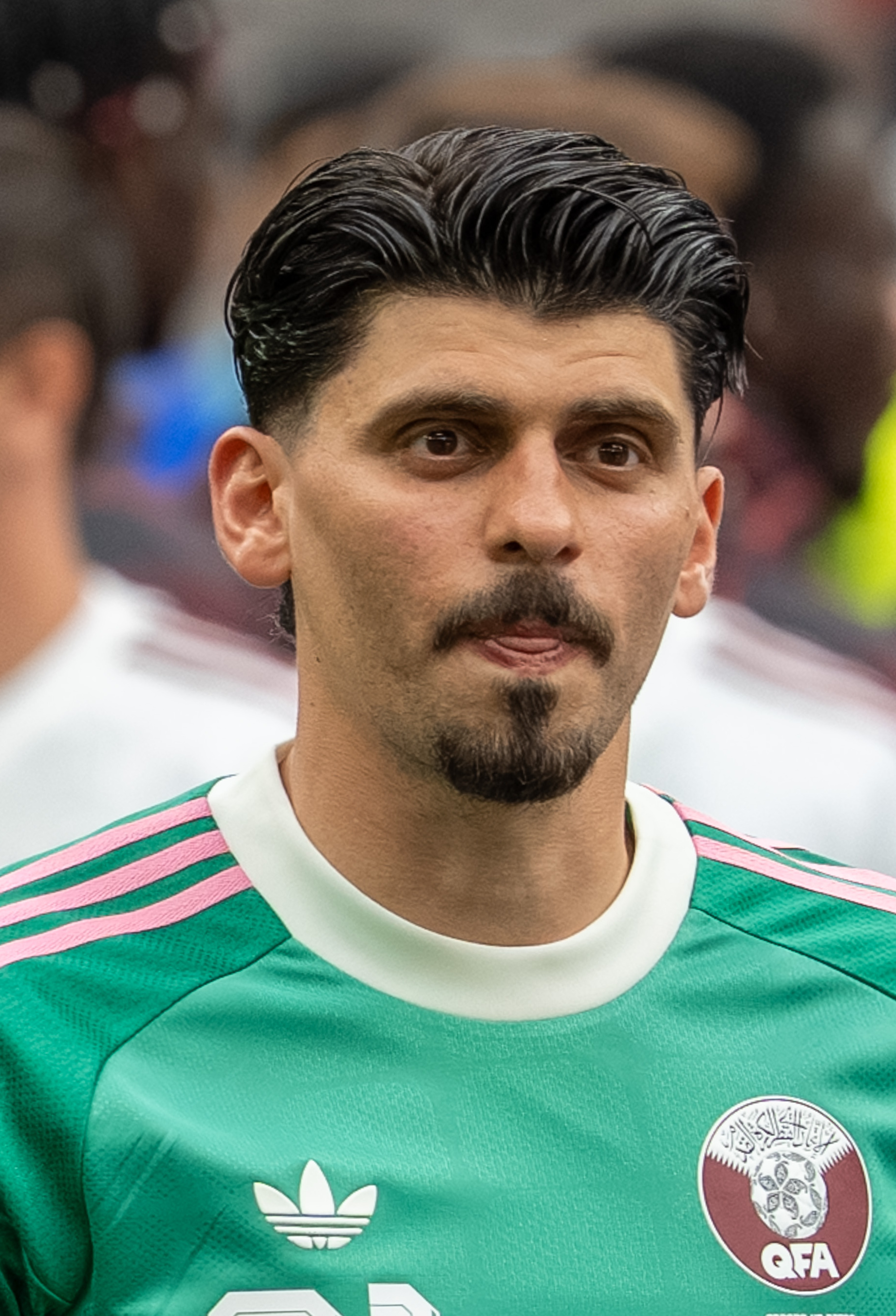
- Zakaria with Qatar in 2026

Personal information
- Full name: Salah Zakaria Hassan
- Date of birth: 24 April 1999 (age 27)
- Height: 1.89 m (6 ft 2 in)
- Position: Goalkeeper

Team information
- Current team: Al-Duhail
- Number: 1

Youth career
- –2019: Al-Wakrah
- 2019: → Eupen (loan)

Senior career*
Years	Team	Apps	(Gls)
2019–2021	Al-Wakrah	0	(0)
2019–2020	→ Al-Gharafa (loan)	7	(0)
2021–	Al-Duhail	78	(0)

International career^{‡}
2018	Qatar U19	4	(0)
2021–2022	Qatar U23	12	(0)
2022–	Qatar	4	(0)
Medal record
Representing Qatar
Men's Football
AFC Asian Cup
Winner	2023
- * Club domestic league appearances and goals as of 17 January 2026 ‡ National team caps and goals as of 7 January 2024 (UTC)

Salah Zakaria Hassan (born 24 April 1999) is a Qatari professional footballer who plays as a goalkeeper for Al-Duhail and the Qatar national team.

== Club career ==
Zakaria began his professional career with Al-Gharafa in 2019. In January 2021 he joined Al-Duhail.

== International career ==
In August 2022, Zakaria made his first appearance for the Qatar national team against Jamaica. The match ended 1-1.

== Honours ==
Al-Duhail SC

- Qatari Stars Cup: 2022-23
- Emir of Qatar Cup: 2022
- Qatar Cup: 2023

Qatar

- AFC Asian Cup: 2023
