= Khaled Mohammed =

Qatari footballer (born 2000)

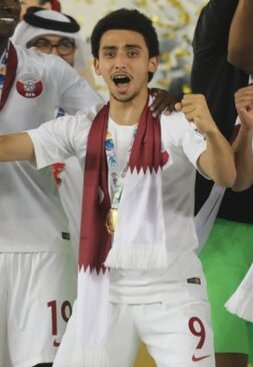
- Mohammed celebrating the 2019 AFC Asian Cup title with Qatar

Personal information
- Full name: Khaled Mohammed Mohammed Saleh
- Date of birth: 7 June 2000 (age 26)
- Place of birth: Doha, Qatar
- Height: 1.65 m (5 ft 5 in)
- Position: Midfielder

Team information
- Current team: Al Ahli (on loan from Al-Duhail)
- Number: 33

Youth career
- –2017: El Jaish
- 2017–2018: Leeds United

Senior career*
| Years | Team | Apps | (Gls) |
| 2018– | Al-Duhail | 67 | (9) |
| 2018 | → Cultural Leonesa (loan) | 0 | (0) |
| 2019 | → Qatar (loan) | 3 | (0) |
| 2020 | → Al Ahli (loan) | 2 | (0) |
| 2021–2022 | → Al Ahli (loan) | 5 | (0) |
| 2024–2025 | → Al-Wakrah (loan) | 14 | (0) |
| 2025– | → Al Ahli (loan) | 10 | (0) |

International career^{‡}
| 2015 | Qatar U16 | 3 | (0) |
| 2017–2018 | Qatar U19 | 8 | (0) |
| 2018 | Qatar U21 | 3 | (0) |
| 2017– | Qatar U23 | 6 | (0) |
| 2018– | Qatar | 3 | (0) |
Medal record
Representing Qatar
Men's Football
AFC Asian Cup
| Winner | 2019 UAE | Team |
| Winner | 2023 Qatar | Team |
- * Club domestic league appearances and goals as of 17 January 2026 ‡ National team caps and goals as of 09:06, 5 January 2019 (UTC)

Khaled Mohammed Mohammed Saleh (Arabic: خَالِد مُحَمَّد مُحَمَّد صَالِح; born 7 June 2000) is a Qatari footballer who plays as a midfielder for Al Ahli, on loan from Al-Duhail.

== Early life ==
Born in Qatar, Khaled is of Egyptian descent.

== Club career ==
Mohammed made his professional debut for Al-Duhail in the Qatari Stars Cup on 11 October 2018, coming on as a substitute in the 68th minute for Abdelrahman Ahmad Nuzha in the 1–1 draw against fellow Qatar Stars League team Al-Gharafa.

== International career ==
On 3 January 2019, following an injury to Ahmed Moein, Mohammed was included in Qatar's squad for the 2019 AFC Asian Cup in the United Arab Emirates, becoming the youngest player of the tournament.

On 2 January 2023, Mohammed was added to Qatar's squad for the 2023 AFC Asian Cup to replace the injured Mohammed Muntari. He became the first player in the history to win two Asian Cup titles without making a single appearance.

== Honours ==
Al-Duhail

- Qatar Stars League: 2022–23
- Qatari Stars Cup: 2022–23
- Qatar Cup: 2023

Qatar

- AFC Asian Cup: 2019, 2023
