= Nam Tae-hee =

South Korean footballer (born 1991)

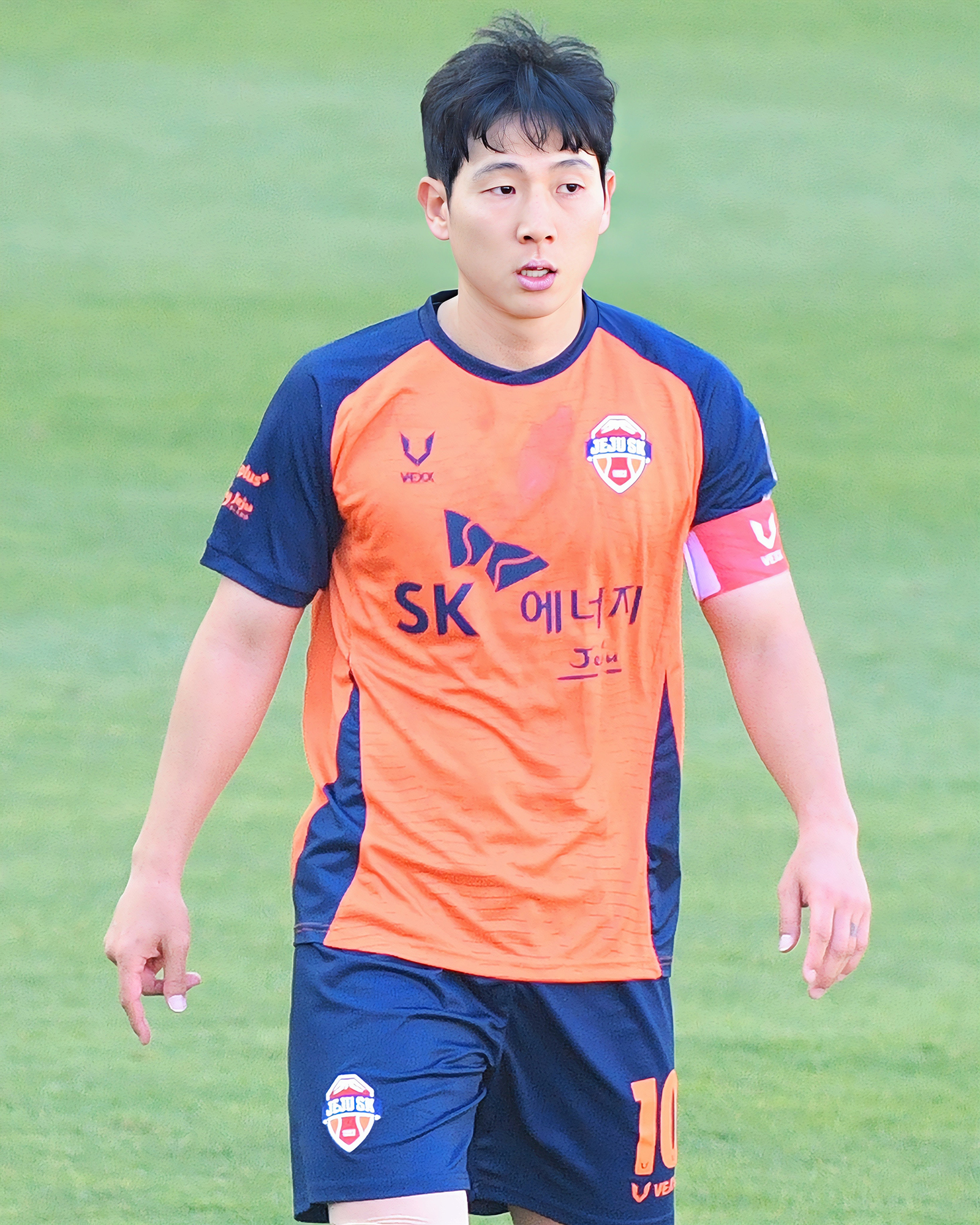
- Nam with Jeju SK in 2026

Personal information
- Date of birth: 3 July 1991 (age 35)
- Place of birth: Jinju, Gyeongnam, South Korea
- Height: 1.74 m (5 ft 9 in)
- Positions: Attacking midfielder; winger

Team information
- Current team: Brisbane Roar
- Number: 10

Youth career
- 2004–2007: Ulsan Hyundai (Note: Played for Hyundai Middle School from 2004 to 2006, and Hyundai High School in 2007, which were academies of Ulsan Hyundai.)
- 2007–2008: Reading

Senior career*
Years	Team	Apps	(Gls)
2009–2011	Valenciennes	37	(0)
2010–2011	Valenciennes B	8	(4)
2012–2019	Al-Duhail	160	(73)
2019–2021	Al-Sadd	37	(10)
2021–2023	Al-Duhail	34	(11)
2023–2024	Yokohama F. Marinos	20	(2)
2024–2026	Jeju SK	45	(6)
2026–	Brisbane Roar	1	(1)

International career^{‡}
2006	South Korea U17	4	(0)
2012	South Korea U23	9	(2)
2011–	South Korea	54	(7)
Medal record
Representing South Korea
Men's football
Olympic Games
Bronze medal – third place	2012 London
AFC Asian Cup
Runner-up	2015 Australia
- * Club domestic league appearances and goals as of 24 October 2026 ‡ National team caps and goals as of 27 March 2024

- Nam Tae-hee
- Hangul: 남태희
- Hanja: 南泰煕
- RR: Nam Taehui
- MR: Nam T'aehŭi

Nam Tae-hee (Korean: 남태희; Hanja: 南泰熙; Korean pronunciation: [nam.tʰɛ̝.ɦi]; born 3 July 1991) is a South Korean professional footballer who plays as an attacking midfielder or central midfielder for A-League Men club Brisbane Roar and the South Korea national team.

== Club career ==
=== Valenciennes ===
Nam played in the Reading's Youth Academy through Korean FA Youth Project, but was unable to sign for the club due to work permit issues.

In July 2009, Nam signed his first professional contract with Ligue 1 side Valenciennes. He made his debut against Nancy on 8 August 2009, becoming the youngest Asian player to play in the Ligue 1 at age 18.

During the 2010–11 season, Nam was able to get more opportunities under manager Philippe Montanier, providing three assists in 18 Ligue 1 matches.

=== Al-Duhail ===
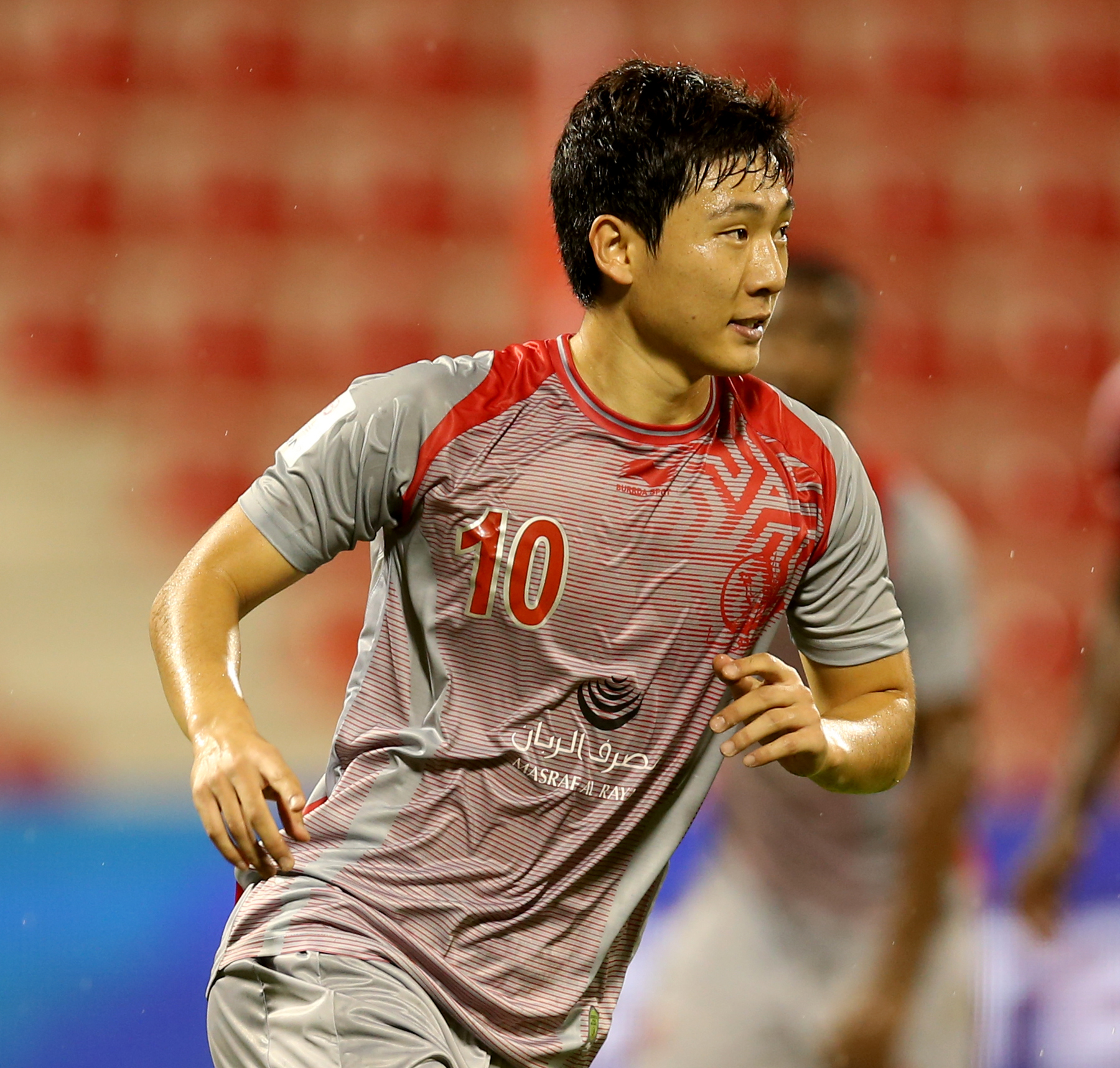
Nam playing for Lekhwiya in 2015

In the winter break of the 2011–12 season, Nam agreed to leave France for Qatar Stars League club Lekhwiya on 26 December 2011. He made his debut on 1 January 2012 against Al Kharaitiyat. He scored his first league goal from a free kick on 19 January 2012. He made his AFC Champions League debut for Lekhwiya on 7 March 2012, scoring the only goal against Al-Ahli Saudi, thereby scoring the first ever goal for Lekhwiya in any regional competition.

Nam scored 12 goals in 24 appearances at the 2013–14 Qatar Stars League, winning the league title as a key forward. He was evaluated as the best player according to league's official statistics, and was selected as one of three nominees for the Qatar Football Association Player of the Year.

On 6 May 2015, Nam contributed to all of Lekhwiya's goals by scoring a goal, providing an assist and winning a penalty in a 3–1 win over Al-Nassr, which was the last group stage match at the 2015 AFC Champions League. This match determined Lekhwiya's first-place finish in the group and Al-Nassr's elimination. Al-Nassr player Fabián Estoyanoff raided Nam from behind at the exit of the field just after the end of the match.

Nam had 14 goals and nine assists in 25 appearances at the 2016–17 Qatar Stars League, bringing his club's fifth league title and his fourth league title. He was named the Qatar FA Player of the Year at the end of the season, defeating Hassan Al-Haydos and Xavi.

Lekhwiya was merged with another QSL club El-Jaish and was rebranded as Al-Duhail prior to the 2017–18 season, but Nam still played as a main player for the club. He helped the club win the league without a defeat for the first time.

On 20 November 2018, Nam injured his anterior cruciate ligament in an international friendly against Uzbekistan. He agreed not to extend his contract with Al-Duhail when taking a rest.

=== Al-Sadd ===
On 8 February 2019, Al-Sadd announced that they acquired Nam from fellow Qatari club Al-Duhail. He signed a three-year contract since the 2019–20 season with Al-Sadd. He became Jung Woo-young's teammate at both the club and the national team.

In the 2020–21 season, Nam contributed to Al-Sadd's first unbeaten QSL season like at Al-Duhail.

=== Return to Al-Duhail ===
Nam returned to Al-Duhail ahead of the 2021–22 season, and played for the club for two more seasons. He scored 122 goals and won 15 titles including six league titles as he played for the club in 270 matches. On 30 July 2023, Al-Duhail confirmed that he would leave the club.

=== Yokohama F. Marinos ===
On 1 August 2023, Nam signed with J1 League club Yokohama F. Marinos. He helped Yokohama reach the final at the 2023–24 AFC Champions League. At the Champions League final against Al-Ain, he played as a starter in a 2–1 first leg win, but was absent from the second leg, which ended in a 5–1 loss.

=== Jeju SK ===
After two half-seasons with Yokohama F. Marinos, in July 2024 it was announced that Nam would be joining K League 1 club Jeju United (renamed Jeju SK in 2025).

== International career ==
Nam started to represent South Korea at the 2006 AFC U-17 Championship. He made his debut for the senior national team on 9 February 2011 in a friendly against Turkey.

Nam played for South Korea under-23 team at the 2012 Summer Olympics. He appeared in all six of South Korea's matches including four matches as a starter, winning a bronze medal.

Nam was named in South Korea's squad for the 2015 AFC Asian Cup held in Australia. In the team's second group match, Nam scored the only goal as Korea defeated Kuwait 1–0 to ensure qualification to the knockout stage.

== Style of play ==
Nam was skilled in technique and sprint, having confidence in his dribbling. However, he had a small physique, and also had difficulty performing systematic teamwork.

== Career statistics ==
=== Club ===
As of 19 July 2025

Appearances and goals by club, season and competition
Club	Season	League			National cup (Note: Includes Coupe de France, Emir of Qatar Cup, Emperor's Cup, Korean FA Cup)		League cup (Note: Includes Coupe de la Ligue, Qatari Stars Cup, J.League Cup)		Continental		Other		Total	
Club	Season	Division	Apps	Goals	Apps	Goals	Apps	Goals	Apps	Goals	Apps	Goals	Apps	Goals
Valenciennes	2009–10	Ligue 1	6	0	1	0	0	0	—		—		7	0
Valenciennes	2010–11	Ligue 1	18	0	1	0	2	0	—		—		21	0
Valenciennes	2011–12	Ligue 1	13	0	0	0	0	0	—		—		13	0
Valenciennes	Total		37	0	2	0	2	0	—		—		41	0
Valenciennes B	2009–10	National 3	4	1	—		—		—		—		4	1
Valenciennes B	2010–11	National 3	3	2	—		—		—		—		3	2
Valenciennes B	2011–12	National 2	1	1	—		—		—		—		1	1
Valenciennes B	Total		8	4	—		—		—		—		8	4
Al-Duhail	2011–12	Qatar Stars League	10	5					6	1			16	6
Al-Duhail	2012–13	Qatar Stars League	19	6					7	0			26	6
Al-Duhail	2013–14	Qatar Stars League	24	12					9	2			33	14
Al-Duhail	2014–15	Qatar Stars League	25	7					8	3			33	10
Al-Duhail	2015–16	Qatar Stars League	25	10					9	2	3 (Note: One appearance and one goal in Sheikh Jassim Cup, two appearances and one goal in Qatar Cup)	2	37	14
Al-Duhail	2016–17	Qatar Stars League	25	14					8	4	1 (Note: Appearance in Sheikh Jassim Cup)	0	34	18
Al-Duhail	2017–18	Qatar Stars League	21	12			1	0	7	1	3 (Note: One appearance and one goal in Sheikh Jassim Cup, two appearances and three goals in Qatar Cup)	4	32	17
Al-Duhail	2018–19	Qatar Stars League	11	7			0	0	2	0	1	0	14	7
Al-Duhail	Total		160	73			1	0	56	13	8	6	225	92
Al-Sadd	2019–20	Qatar Stars League	19	3			3	1	7	1	5 (Note: One appearance in Sheikh Jassim Cup, two appearances in FIFA Club World Cup, two appearances and one goal in Qatar Cup)	1	34	6
Al-Sadd	2020–21	Qatar Stars League	18	7	2	2	3	2	10	1	2 (Note: Appearances in Qatar Cup)	0	35	12
Al-Sadd	Total		37	10	2	2	6	3	17	2	7	1	69	18
Al-Duhail	2021–22	Qatar Stars League	16	5	4	2	0	0	6	0	—		26	7
Al-Duhail	2022–23	Qatar Stars League	18	6	1	1	7	1	3	0	2	1	31	9
Al-Duhail	Total		34	11	5	3	7	1	9	0	2	1	57	16
Yokohama F. Marinos	2023	J1 League	9	0	0	0	3	1	5	0	—		17	1
Yokohama F. Marinos	2024	J1 League	11	2	1	0	0	0	6	0	—		18	2
Yokohama F. Marinos	Total		20	2	1	0	3	1	11	0	—		35	3
Jeju SK	2024	K League 1	8	0	2	0	—		—		—		10	0
Jeju SK	2025	K League 1	22	3	0	0	—		—		—		22	3
Jeju SK	Total		30	3	2	0	—		—		—		32	3
Career total			326	103	12	5	19	5	93	15	17	8	467	136

=== International ===
Scores and results list South Korea's goal tally first.

List of international goals scored by Nam Tae-hee
No.	Date	Venue	Opponent	Score	Result	Competition
1	10 October 2014	Cheonan Stadium, Cheonan, South Korea	Paraguay	2–0	2–0	Friendly
2	13 January 2015	Canberra Stadium, Canberra, Australia	Kuwait	1–0	1–0	2015 AFC Asian Cup
3	12 November 2015	Suwon World Cup Stadium, Suwon, South Korea	Myanmar	4–0	4–0	2018 FIFA World Cup qualification
4	15 November 2016	Seoul World Cup Stadium, Seoul, South Korea	Uzbekistan	1–1	2–1	2018 FIFA World Cup qualification
5	7 September 2018	Goyang Stadium, Goyang, South Korea	Costa Rica	2–0	2–0	Friendly
6	20 November 2018	QSAC, Brisbane, Australia	Uzbekistan	1–0	4–0	Friendly
7	5 June 2021	Goyang Stadium, Goyang, South Korea	Turkmenistan	2–0	5–0	2022 FIFA World Cup qualification

== Honours ==
Al-Duhail

- Qatar Stars League: 2011–12, 2013–14, 2014–15, 2016–17, 2017–18, 2022–23
- Emir of Qatar Cup: 2016, 2018, 2022
- Qatari Stars Cup: 2022–23
- Sheikh Jassim Cup: 2015, 2016
- Qatar Cup: 2013, 2015, 2018, 2023

Al-Sadd

- Qatar Stars League: 2020–21
- Emir of Qatar Cup: 2020, 2021
- Qatari Stars Cup: 2019–20
- Sheikh Jassim Cup: 2019
- Qatar Cup: 2020, 2021

Yokohama F. Marinos

- AFC Champions League runner-up: 2023–24

South Korea U23

- Summer Olympics bronze medal: 2012

South Korea

- AFC Asian Cup runner-up: 2015

Individual

- Qatar Stars League Team of the Season: 2013–14
- Qatar FA Player of the Year: 2017
- AFC Champions League All-Star Squad: 2018, 2019
