= Luiz Júnior =

Luiz Júnior may refer to:

- Luiz Júnior (footballer, born 1989), Qatari football defender
- Luiz Júnior (footballer, born 1990), Brazilian football striker
- Luiz Júnior (footballer, born 2001), Brazilian football goalkeeper
