= Youssef El-Arabi =

Footballer (born 1987)

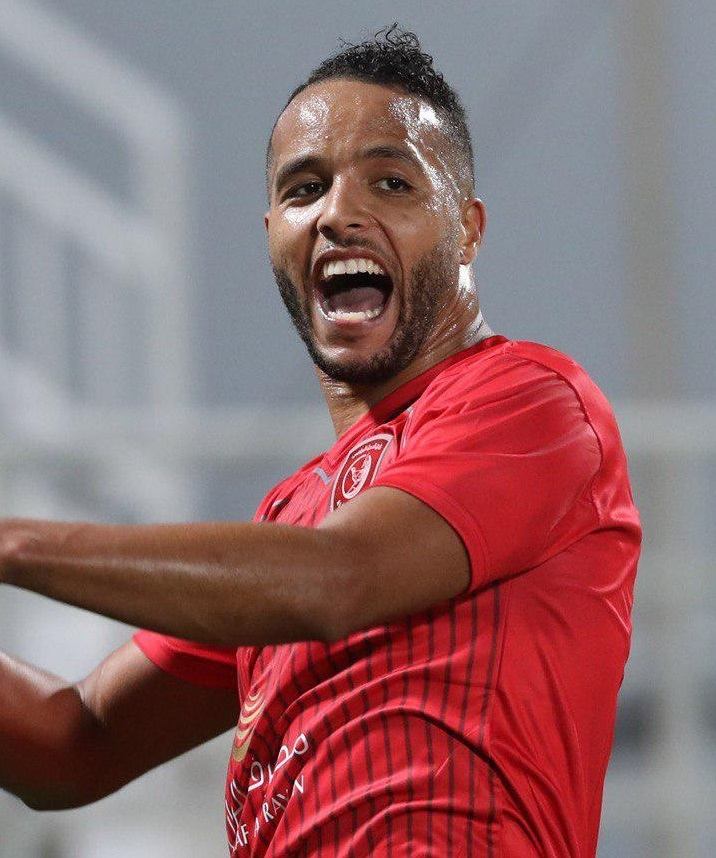
- El-Arabi in 2019

Personal information
- Date of birth: 3 February 1987 (age 39)
- Place of birth: Caen, France
- Height: 1.83 m (6 ft 0 in)
- Position: Forward

Team information
- Current team: Marko
- Number: 9

Youth career
- 2001–2002: Caen
- 2002–2004: SC Hérouville
- 2004–2007: USON Mondeville

Senior career*
Years	Team	Apps	(Gls)
2007–2009	Caen B	48	(13)
2008–2011	Caen	75	(28)
2011–2012	Al-Hilal	21	(12)
2012–2016	Granada	130	(44)
2016–2019	Al-Duhail	60	(76)
2019–2024	Olympiacos	148	(68)
2024–2025	APOEL	31	(13)
2025–2026	Nantes	24	(3)
2026–	Marko	10	(7)

International career^{‡}
2010–2021	Morocco	47	(16)
- * Club domestic league appearances and goals as of 16 November 2026 ‡ National team caps and goals as of 29 July 2024

Youssef El-Arabi (Arabic: يُوسُف الْعَرَبِيّ; born 3 February 1987) is a Moroccan professional footballer who plays as a forward for the Super League Greece 2 club Marko.

He began his career with hometown club Caen in Ligue 1, making his debut in 2008. After a season in Saudi Arabia with Al Hilal he signed for La Liga club Granada for a club record €5 million in 2012. He scored 45 goals in 134 official games before leaving for Al-Duhail in 2016. In three years in the Qatar Stars League, he was top scorer twice, and totalled 107 goals in 95 games across all competitions before returning to Europe with Olympiacos.

Born in France, El-Arabi chose to represent Morocco at international level, making his debut in 2010. He represented them at three Africa Cup of Nations tournaments.

== Club career ==
=== Caen and Al-Hilal ===
On 20 December 2008, El-Arabi made his debut for Caen, coming on as a substitute in the 76th minute against Lyon in Ligue 1. He played 2 more games that season (coming on in both as a substitute), and scored no goals (2008–09). The following season (2009–10) saw El-Arabi score 11 goals in 34 games (he came on in 11 of these games as a substitute) for Caen, as well as claiming eight assists, in Ligue 2. This season (2010–11) has seen El-Arabi score 17 goals in 38 games for Caen, as well as claiming five assists, in Ligue 1. After rejecting bids from Sevilla FC and Genoa C.F.C, he eventually signed for Al-Hilal FC in July 2011 on a four-year contract.

=== Granada ===
On 19 July 2012, El-Arabi returned to Europe, signing a five-year contract for La Liga club Granada for a club record €5 million fee. He made his debut on 20 August, starting as the season began with a 1–0 loss at Rayo Vallecano. His first goal was scored on 7 October, a penalty to open a 2–1 win at Mallorca, and his total of eight goals in 31 games helped his side avoid relegation.

He scored 12 times in his second season at the Estadio Nuevo Los Carmenes, including his first La Liga hat-trick, all three goals in a 3–1 win over rivals Málaga on 8 November 2013. At the end of the season, he was nominated for the Best African player at the LFP Awards, losing out to teammate Yacine Brahimi.

On 4 October 2014, El-Arabi scored in the first minute against Málaga, albeit in a 2–1 away loss. He put the side ahead with a penalty at Levante the following 23 February but was later sent off for scrapping with Iván Ramis in a loss by the same score. Granada avoided relegation on goal difference.

In his final season at Granada, El-Arabi scored 17 times in 38 games, including a hat-trick in a 5–1 win over Levante on 21 April 2016.

=== Al-Duhail ===
On 18 July 2016, El-Arabi signed for Lekhwiya SC of the Qatar Stars League. He made his debut on 17 September, scoring the opening goal of a 4–0 home win over Muaither. His 24 goals in 18 games made him joint top scorer for the season alongside Al Sadd's Baghdad Bounedjah, while Lekhwiya won the title.

On 11 December 2017, El-Arabi scored six goals in one match for the renamed Al-Duhail in an 8–0 QSL Cup group stage win at Al-Khor. His team retained their league title, and he was again top scorer, with 26 goals in 20 games, one more than his teammate Youssef Msakni.

=== Olympiacos ===
On 6 July 2019, El-Arabi signed a three-year contract with Greek side Olympiacos, returning to Europe after three years in Qatar. He made his Super League Greece debut on 24 August, scoring the only goal of a home win over Asteras Tripolis through a 7th-minute penalty. Three days later, he scored both goals of a 2–1 win at FC Krasnodar in a Champions League play-off second leg match, putting the Piraeus-based team through 6–1 on aggregate.

El-Arabi scored his first Champions League goal on 22 October 2019 in a 2–3 loss against Bayern Munich. On 11 December 2019, El Arabi scored the only goal with a late penalty against Red Star Belgrade in their final Champions League Group B game, to book a place in the Europa League at the expense of the Serbians. The following 12 January 2020, he scored a hat-trick in a 4–0 away win over Lamia.

On 27 February 2020, Olympiacos played their second leg of the Round of 32 at the Emirates Stadium, and El-Arabi scored a goal at the 119th minute of extra time to knock Arsenal out of the UEFA Europa League on away goals. He scored on 28 June as they won 2–1 at AEK Athens to secure a 45th league title, the first in three years.

In 2020–21, El-Arabi was top scorer with 22 goals as Olympiacos retained the title. On 4 November 2021, in a 2–1 Europa League loss UEFA Europa League to Eintracht Frankfurt, he surpassed Predrag Đorđević and Kostas Mitroglou as the club's top European scorer with 16 goals, doing so in 33 games. On 15 December, he scored a hat trick in a 3–0 home win against Atromitos F.C. to reach 50 goals in 81 league appearances; his fourth hat-trick put him equal with Giovanni, having done so in fewer games than the Brazilian's 111.

El Arabi was part of Olympiacos's UEFA Conference League league triumph in the 2023–24 season.

=== APOEL ===
After his contract expired on 1 July 2024 with Olympiacos, El-Arabi joined Cypriot First Division club APOEL.

=== Nantes ===
On 18 July 2025, El-Arabi joined Ligue 1 club Nantes.

On 20 September 2025, he scored his first goal for the club in a 2–2 draw with Rennes in Ligue 1, becoming at 38 years 7 months and 17 days Nantes’ oldest goalscorer ever.

=== Marko ===
On 1 August 2026 he was signed by the Super League Greece 2 club Marko.

== International career ==
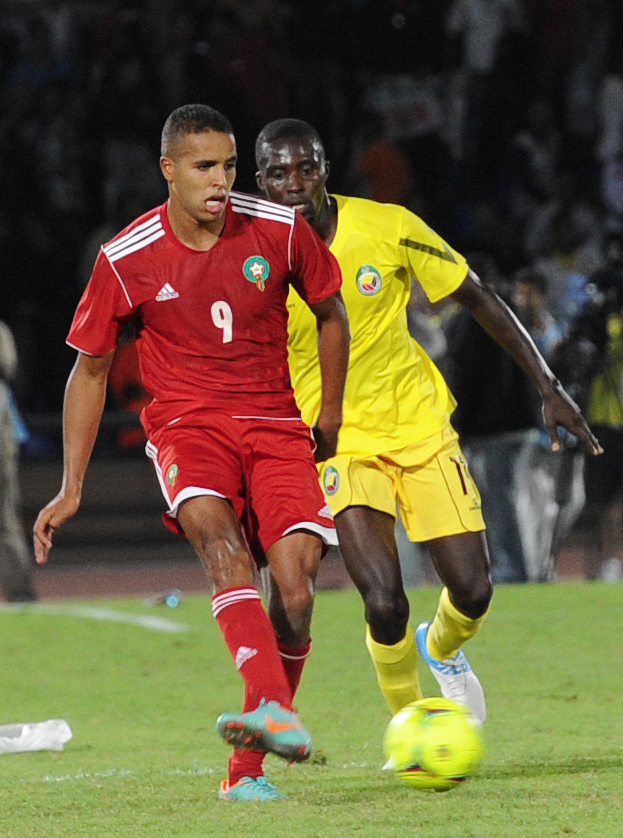
El-Arabi playing for Morocco in 2012

On 5 September 2010, El-Arabi made his debut for the Morocco national football team, coming on as a substitute in the 65th minute for Mounir El-Hamdaoui against the Central African Republic. He followed this up with games against Tanzania and Northern Ireland, coming on as a substitute in both games.

Manager Eric Gerets named El-Arabi among the 23 players for the 2012 Africa Cup of Nations, where he started and played as a substitute for one game each of a group-stage exit. On 13 October that year, he scored and provided an assist in a 4–0 home win over Mozambique as the Atlas Lions overturned a first-leg deficit to reach the 2013 edition; in another group exit in South Africa, he scored the equaliser in a draw with Cape Verde.

On 29 March 2016, El-Arabi scored both goals in a 2–0 win over the same opponents at the Stade de Marrakech to qualify for the 2017 Africa Cup of Nations. Hervé Renard called him up for the finals in Gabon, where he made only an 11-minute substitute appearance in a run to the quarter-finals. He was a noted omission from the French manager's squad for the 2018 FIFA World Cup in Russia.

== Career statistics ==
=== Club ===
As of match played 16 November 2026

Appearances and goals by club, season and competition
Club	Season	League			National cup (Note: Includes Coupe de France, King Cup, Emir of Qatar Cup, Copa del Rey, Greek Cup)		League cup (Note: Includes Saudi Crown Prince Cup, Qatari Stars Cup)		Continental		Other		Total	
Club	Season	Division	Apps	Goals	Apps	Goals	Apps	Goals	Apps	Goals	Apps	Goals	Apps	Goals
Caen B	2007–08	Championnat de France Amateur	23	1	–		–		–		–		23	1
Caen B	2008–09	Championnat de France Amateur	25	12	–		–		–		–		25	12
Caen B	Total		48	13	–		–		–		–		48	13
Caen	2008–09	Ligue 1	3	0	0	0	–		–		–		3	0
Caen	2009–10	Ligue 2	34	11	3	2	–		–		–		37	13
Caen	2010–11	Ligue 1	38	17	1	0	–		–		–		39	17
Caen	Total		75	28	4	2	–		–		–		79	30
Al-Hilal	2011–12	Saudi Pro League	21	12	4	0	1	0	6 (Note: Appearances in AFC Champions League)	4	–		32	16
Granada	2012–13	La Liga	31	8	1	0	–		–		–		32	8
Granada	2013–14	La Liga	36	12	0	0	–		–		–		36	12
Granada	2014–15	La Liga	28	8	0	0	–		–		–		28	8
Granada	2015–16	La Liga	35	16	3	1	–		–		–		38	17
Granada	Total		130	44	4	1	–		–		–		134	45
Al Duhail	2016–17	Qatar Stars League	18	24	1	1	0	0	4	3	–		23	28
Al Duhail	2017–18	Qatar Stars League	20	26	5	3	3	7	9	9	–		37	45
Al Duhail	2018–19	Qatar Stars League	22	26	1	1	6	3	6	4	–		35	34
Al Duhail	Total		60	76	7	5	9	10	19	16	–		95	107
Olympiacos	2019–20	Super League Greece	34	20	4	0	–		13 (Note: Nine appearances and five goals in UEFA Champions League, four appearances and two goals in UEFA Europa League)	7	–		51	27
Olympiacos	2020–21	Super League Greece	33	22	5	2	–		11 (Note: Seven appearances and one goal in UEFA Champions League, four appearances and three goals in UEFA Europa League)	4	–		49	28
Olympiacos	2021–22	Super League Greece	34	16	4	2	–		13 (Note: Three appearances and one goal in UEFA Champions League, seven appearances and four goals in UEFA Europa League)	5	–		51	23
Olympiacos	2022–23	Super League Greece	34	6	6	2	–		9	2	–		49	10
Olympiacos	2023–24	Super League Greece	13	4	0	0	–		12 (Note: Six appearances and one goal in UEFA Europa League, three appearances and one goal in UEFA Conference League)	2	–		25	6
Olympiacos	Total		148	68	19	6	–		58	20	–		225	94
Olympiacos B	2023–24	Super League Greece 2	2	1	–		–		–		–		2	1
APOEL	2024–25	Cypriot First Division	27	13	0	0	–		11 (Note: Four appearances in UEFA Champions League, two appearances and one goal in UEFA Europa League, five appearances in UEFA Conference League)	1	1 (Note: Appearance in Cypriot Super Cup)	0	39	14
Nantes	2025–26	Ligue 1	24	3	2	1	–		–		–		26	4
Marko	2026–27	Super League Greece 2	10	7	3	0	–		–		–		13	7
Career total			547	265	42	15	10	10	93	41	1	0	693	331

=== International ===
Appearances and goals by national team and year
National team	Year	Apps	Goals
Morocco	2010	3	0
Morocco	2011	6	1
Morocco	2012	7	2
Morocco	2013	9	4
Morocco	2014	5	3
Morocco	2015	4	2
Morocco	2016	5	3
Morocco	2017	2	0
Morocco	2018	0	0
Morocco	2019	1	0
Morocco	2020	3	1
Morocco	2021	2	0
Total		47	16

Scores and results list Morocco's goal tally first.

No.	Date	Venue	Opponent	Score	Result	Competition
1.	10 August 2011	Stade Demba Diop, Dakar, Senegal	Senegal	2–0	2–0	Friendly
2.	29 February 2012	Stade de Marrakech, Marrakesh, Morocco	Burkina Faso	2–0	2–0	Friendly
3.	13 October 2012	Stade de Marrakech, Marrakesh, Morocco	Mozambique	3–0	4–0	2013 Africa Cup of Nations qualification
4.	23 January 2013	Moses Mabhida Stadium, Durban, South Africa	Cape Verde	1–1	1–1	2013 Africa Cup of Nations
5.	24 March 2013	Benjamin Mkapa National Stadium, Dar es Salaam, Tanzania	Tanzania	3–1	3–1	2014 FIFA World Cup qualification
6.	8 June 2013	Stade de Marrakech, Marrakesh, Morocco	Tanzania	2–0	2–1	2014 FIFA World Cup qualification
7.	7 September 2013	Stade Félix Houphouët-Boigny, Abidjan, Ivory Coast	Ivory Coast	1–0	1–1	2014 FIFA World Cup qualification
8.	5 March 2014	Stade de Marrakech, Marrakesh, Morocco	Gabon	1–0	1–1	Friendly
9.	23 May 2014	Estádio de São Luís, Faro, Portugal	Mozambique	2–0	4–0	Friendly
10.	23 May 2014	Estádio de São Luís, Faro, Portugal	Mozambique	4–0	4–0	Friendly
11.	5 September 2015	Estádio Nacional 12 de Julho, Sao Tomé, Sao Tomé & Principé	São Tomé and Príncipe	2–0	3–0	2017 Africa Cup of Nations qualification
12.	12 November 2015	Stade Adrar, Agadir, Morocco	Equatorial Guinea	1–0	2–0	2018 FIFA World Cup qualification
13.	26 March 2016	Estádio Nacional de Cabo Verde, Praia, Cape Verde	Cape Verde	1–0	1–0	2017 Africa Cup of Nations qualification
14.	29 March 2016	Stade de Marrakech, Marrakech, Morocco	Cape Verde	1–0	2–0	2017 Africa Cup of Nations qualification
15.	29 March 2016	Stade de Marrakech, Marrakech, Morocco	Cape Verde	2–0	2–0	2017 Africa Cup of Nations qualification
16.	9 October 2020	Prince Moulay Abdellah Stadium, Rabat, Morocco	Senegal	3–0	3–1	Friendly

== Honours ==
Caen

- Ligue 2: 2009–10

Al Hilal

- Saudi Crown Prince Cup: 2011–12

Al Duhail

- Qatar Stars League: 2016–17, 2017–18
- Qatar Emir Cup: 2018, 2019
- Qatar Cup: 2018
- Qatari Sheikh Jassim Cup: 2016

Olympiacos

- Super League Greece: 2019–20, 2020–21, 2021–22
- Greek Football Cup: 2019–20
- UEFA Conference League: 2023–24

APOEL

- Cypriot Super Cup: 2024

Individual

- Qatar Stars League top scorer: 2016–17, 2017–18
- Qatar Starts League Player of the Month: October 2017
- AFC Champions League OPTA Best XI: 2018
- Super League Greece Player of the Season: 2020–21
- Super League Greece top scorer: 2019–20, 2020–21
- Super League Greece Best Foreign Player: 2019–20, 2020–21
- Super League Greece Team of the Season: 2019–20, 2020–21
- Super League Greece Player of the Month: January 2020, December 2020, November 2021,May 2022
- Olympiacos Player of the Season: 2019–20, 2020–21, 2021–22
- Cypriot First Division top scorer: 2024–25

Records

- He has achieved the most hat-tricks in the history of Olympiacos, a total of 5 times.
