= 2016 Sheikh Jassim Cup =

Al-Duhail SC	Al-Rayyan SC
QSL	Emir of Qatar Cup
2	0
- Date: 12 September 2016
- Venue: Jassim Bin Hamad Stadium, Doha

The 2016 Sheikh Jassim Cup was the 38th edition of the cup competition for football teams from Qatar. It was changed from a group staged pre-season tournament featuring all Qatari Stars League sides, to a one-off match between the previous seasons Qatar Stars League winners and Emir of Qatar Cup winners.

== Match details ==
12 September 2016
16:00

Al-Duhail SC	2–0	Al-Rayyan SC
Youssef El-Arabi 5'; Ismaeel Mohammad 93'	Report

Jassim Bin Hamad Stadium, Doha

Al-Duhail SC	Al-Rayyan SC

Formation: 3–4–3
GK	1	(Qatar) Amine Lecomte
DF	3	(Qatar) Ahmed Yasser
DF	2	(Qatar) Mohamed Musa
DF	4	(Spain) Chico Flores
MF	12	(Qatar) Karim Boudiaf
MF	8	(Qatar) Luiz Caera
MF	10	(South Korea) Nam Tae-hee (substituted off) 83'
MF	6	(Qatar) Khalid Muftah
FW	11	(Qatar) Mohammed Muntari (substituted off) 75'
FW	9	(Qatar) Youssef El-Arabi (substituted off) 75'
FW	28	(Tunisia) Youssef Msakni
Substitutes
MF	5	(Qatar) Abdelrahman Moustafa (substituted in) 83'
FW	7	(Qatar) Ismaeel Mohammad (substituted in) 75'
FW	19	(Qatar) Almoez Ali (substituted in) 75'
Manager
(Algeria) Djamel Belmadi

Formation: 5–3–2
GK	1	(Qatar) Saud Abdullah Al Hajiri
DF	31	(Qatar) Daniel Goumou (substituted off) 65'
DF	24	(Qatar) Musa Haroon
DF	5	(Brazil) Nathan Ribeiro
DF	13	(Uruguay) Gonzalo Viera
DF	2	(Qatar) Mohammed Alaaeldin (substituted off) 77'
MF	20	(South Korea) Myong-jin Ko (substituted off) 84'
MF	8	(Argentina) Ulises Pascua
MF	10	(Qatar) Rodrigo Tabata
FW	9	(Spain) Sergio García
FW	23	(Qatar) Sebastián Soria
Substitutes
DF	11	(Qatar) Abdulkarim Al-Ali (substituted in) 65'
FW	17	(Ivory Coast) Babou Sidiki (substituted in) 84'
FW	7	(Qatar) Ahmed Alaaeldin (substituted in) 77'
Manager
(Uruguay) Jorge Fossati

Man of the Match:
()

Match rules

- 90 minutes.
- Penalty shoot-out if scores still level.
- Seven named substitutes, of which up to three may be used.
