= 2015 Sheikh Jassim Cup =

Al-Duhail SC	Al Sadd SC
QSL	Emir of Qatar Cup
4	1
- Date: 21 January 2016
- Venue: Jassim Bin Hamad Stadium, Doha

The 2015 Sheikh Jassim Cup was the 37th edition of the cup competition for football teams from Qatar. It was changed from a group staged pre-season tournament featuring all Qatari Stars League sides, to a one-off match between the previous seasons Qatar Stars League winners and Emir of Qatar Cup winners.

== Match details ==
21 January 2016
16:00

Al-Duhail SC	4–1	Al Sadd SC
Ismaeel Mohammad 19'; Mohammed Razak 47'; Nam Tae-hee 61'; Vladimir Weiss 88'	Report	Meshaal Al-Shammeri 51'

Jassim Bin Hamad Stadium, Doha

Al-Duhail SC	Al Sadd SC

Formation: 2–5–3
GK	40	(Qatar) Amine Lecomte
DF	2	(Qatar) Mohamed Musa
DF	4	(Spain) Chico Flores
MF	23	(Qatar) Ahmed Abdul Maqsoud
MF	12	(Qatar) Karim Boudiaf
MF	8	(Qatar) Luiz Caera
MF	10	(South Korea) Nam Tae-hee
MF	77	(Qatar) Khalid Muftah
FW	70	(Qatar) Ismaeel Mohammad (substituted off) 79'
FW	14	(Qatar) Kangambo Trezor
FW	28	(Tunisia) Youssef Msakni (substituted off) 35'
Substitutes
MF	5	(Qatar) Mohammed Razak (substituted in) 35'
MF	7	(Slovakia) Vladimir Weiss (substituted in) 79'
Manager
(Algeria) Djamel Belmadi

Formation: 3–5–2
GK	1	(Qatar) Saad Al Sheeb
DF	27	(Qatar) Jasser Yahya
DF	13	(Qatar) Ibrahim Majid
DF	39	(Algeria) Nadir Belhadj
MF	15	(Qatar) Talal Al-Bloushi
MF	66	(Qatar) Mohammed Kasola
MF	6	(Spain) Xavi
MF	14	(Qatar) Khalfan Ibrahim
FW	10	(Qatar) Hassan Al-Haydos
FW	7	(Morocco) Hamza Al Senhaji (substituted off) 47'
FW	11	(Brazil) Muriqui
Substitutes
MF	8	(Qatar) Meshaal Al-Shammeri (substituted in) 47'
Manager
(Portugal) Jesualdo Ferreira

Man of the Match:
()

Match rules

- 90 minutes.
- Penalty shoot-out if scores still level.
- Seven named substitutes, of which up to three may be used.
