= Grégory Gomis =

French footballer (born 1990)

Personal information
- Full name: Grégory Ditanth Gomis
- Date of birth: 4 November 1990 (age 36)
- Place of birth: Versailles, France
- Height: 1.86 m (6 ft 1 in)
- Position: Goalkeeper

Youth career
- 2003–2005: FC Versailles 78
- 2005–2010: Sedan

Senior career*
Years	Team	Apps	(Gls)
2010–2012	Vannes OC	2	(0)
2012–2021	Al-Salliya	121	(0)
2019–2021	→ Al-Arabi (loan)	18	(0)
- * Club domestic league appearances and goals as of 17:35, 7 July 2014 (UTC)

Grégory Ditanth Gomis (born 4 November 1990) is a French professional footballer who plays as a goalkeeper.

== Club career ==
After playing for Vannes in the third division of French football, he signed for Qatari club Al-Salliya in 2012. In 2014, he won the Emir of Qatar Cup with the club. He soon extended his contract with the outfit. Gomis won 2014 Best goalkeeper of Qatar Stars league.

== International career ==
Gomis was pre-called up by Guinea-Bissau for the 2019 Africa Cup of Nations.
