= Ulises Pascua =

Qatari footballer

Personal information
- Full name: Ulises Jesús Pascua
- Date of birth: 5 December 1989 (age 36)
- Place of birth: Chivilcoy, Argentina
- Position: Midfielder

Senior career*
Years	Team	Apps	(Gls)
2009–2015	Al Shahaniya	18	(2)
2015–2017	Al-Rayyan	18	(3)
2017–2018	Al Shahaniya	12	(0)
2018–2019	Al-Wakrah	15	(3)
2019–2020	Al-Kharaitiyat	19	(3)
2020–2023	Al Shahaniya	43	(2)
- * Club domestic league appearances and goals

Ulises Pascua (born 5 December 1989) is an Argentine footballer who plays as a midfielder.
