= 2015 Qatar Cup =

Tournament details
- Country: Qatar
- Dates: April 26–May 1
- Teams: 4

Final positions
- Champions: Al-Duhail SC (2nd title)
- Runners-up: El Jaish SC

Tournament statistics
- Matches played: 3
- Goals scored: 10 (3.33 per match)
- Top goal scorer(s): (Ghana) Mohammed Razak (Uruguay) Sebastián Soria (2 goals)

The 2015 Qatar Cup, more widely known as the Crown Prince Cup, was the twenty-first edition of the Qatar Cup. It was played from April 26–May 1. The cup is contested by the top four finishers of the 2014–15 Qatar Stars League.

== Participants ==
Team	2014–15 League Position
Al-Duhail SC	Champions
Al Sadd SC	Runners-up
El Jaish SC	Third
Qatar SC	Fourth

== Matches ==
=== Semi-finals ===
26 April 2015
14:15 AST

Al-Sadd SC	1–3	El Jaish SC
Yusef Ahmed 49'	Report	Wagner Ribeiro 23'; Romarinho 56'; Mohammed Muntari 71'

Abdullah bin Khalifa Stadium, Doha
26 April 2015
18:00 AST

Al-Duhail SC	5–0	Qatar SC
Sebastián Soria 8'; Youssef Msakni 44'; Mohamed Musa 78'; Mohammed Razak 85'; Mohammed Razak 90+2'	Report

Abdullah bin Khalifa Stadium, Doha

== Finals ==
1 May 2015
16:45 AST

El Jaish SC	0–1	Al-Duhail SC
	Report	Sebastián Soria 79'

Abdullah bin Khalifa Stadium, Doha

== Bracket ==
Semi-finals
2015–04–26 - Doha
Al-Duhail SC	5
Qatar SC	0
2015–04–26 – Doha
Al Sadd SC	1
El Jaish SC	3

Final
2015–05–01 - Doha
El Jaish SC	0
Al-Duhail SC	1

== Top scorers ==
Rank	Player	Club	Goals
1	(Ghana) Mohammed Razak	Al-Duhail SC	2
1	(Uruguay) Sebastián Soria	Al-Duhail SC	2
2	(Qatar) Mohammed Musa	Al-Duhail SC	1
2	(Tunisia) Youssef Msakni	Al-Duhail SC	1
2	(Saudi Arabia) Yusef Ahmed	Al-Sadd SC	1
2	(Croatia) Wagner Ribeiro	El Jaish SC	1
2	(Brazil) Romarinho	El Jaish SC	1
2	(Ghana) Mohammed Muntari	El Jaish SC	1
