= 2022–23 Qatari Stars Cup =

Tournament details
- Country: Qatar
- Dates: 19 September 2022 – 27 March 2023
- Teams: 12

Final positions
- Champions: Al-Duhail
- Runners-up: Umm Salal

Tournament statistics
- Matches played: 33

The 2023 Qatari Stars Cup was the twelfth edition of Qatari Stars Cup.

The tournament featured 12 teams divided into 2 groups.

== Round One Groups ==
Group A	Group B
Umm Salal SC; Al Sadd SC; Qatar SC; Al-Ahli SC; Al-Wakrah SC; Al-Sailiya SC	Al-Duhail SC; Al-Rayyan SC; Al-Shamal SC; Al-Gharafa SC; Al-Arabi SC; Al-Markhiya SC

=== Standings ===
==== Group A ====
Pos	Team	Pld	W	D	L	GF	GA	GD	Pts
1	Umm Salal SC	5	4	1	0	14	8	+6	13
2	Al Sadd SC	5	3	0	2	15	6	+9	9
3	Qatar SC	5	3	0	2	10	8	+2	9
4	Al-Ahli SC	5	2	1	2	8	11	−3	7
5	Al-Wakrah SC	5	1	1	3	7	13	−6	4
6	Al-Sailiya SC	5	0	1	4	3	11	−8	1

Source: soccerway.com
Rules for classification: 1) points; 2) goal difference; 3) number of goals scored.

===== Results =====
Date	Team 1	Score	Team 2
2022/09/19	Al Sadd SC	4–0	Al-Sailiya SC
2022/09/19	Umm Salal SC	2–1	Al-Ahli SC
2022/09/19	Al-Wakrah SC	1–3	Qatar SC
2022/09/25	Al-Sailiya SC	2–3	Al-Ahli SC
2022/09/25	Al Sadd SC	3–0	Al-Wakrah SC
2022/09/25	Qatar SC	1–3	Umm Salal SC
2022/10/01	Al-Ahli SC	2–1	Qatar SC
2022/10/01	Umm Salal	3–2	Al-Sadd SC
2022/10/01	Al-Wakrah SC	3–5	Umm Salal SC
2022/10/07	Al Sadd SC	4–0	Al-Ahli SC
2022/10/07	Al-Sailiya SC	0–2	Qatar SC
2022/10/07	Qatar SC	3–2	Al Sadd SC
2022/10/14	Al-Ahli SC	2–2	Al-Wakrah SC
2022/10/14	Umm Salal SC	1–1	Al-Sailiya SC
2022/10/14	Qatar SC	3–2	Al Sadd SC

==== Group B ====
Pos	Team	Pld	W	D	L	GF	GA	GD	Pts
1	Al-Duhail SC	5	4	1	0	18	8	+10	13
2	Al-Arabi SC	5	3	1	1	6	4	+2	10
3	Al-Gharafa SC	5	2	2	1	8	6	+2	8
4	Al-Rayyan SC	5	1	2	2	9	11	−2	5
5	Al-Shamal SC	5	1	1	3	7	10	−3	4
6	Al-Markhiya SC	5	0	1	4	7	16	−9	1

Source: soccerway.com
Rules for classification: 1) points; 2) goal difference; 3) number of goals scored.

===== Results =====
Date	Team 1	Score	Team 2
2022/09/20	Al-Duhail SC	8–3	Al-Markhiya SC
2022/09/20	Al-Gharafa	4–3	Al-Rayyan SC
2022/09/20	Al-Arabi SC	1–0	Al-Shamal SC
2022/09/26	Al-Shamal	0–0	Al-Gharafa SC
2022/09/26	Al-Duhail SC	3–2	Al-Arabi SC
2022/09/26	Al-Markhiya SC	1–1	Al-Rayyan SC
2022/10/02	Al-Rayyan SC	4–2	Al-Shamal SC
2022/10/02	Al-Arabi SC	1–0	Al-Markhiya SC
2022/10/02	Al-Gharafa SC	1–1	Al-Duhail SC
2022/10/08	Al-Markhiya SC	2–3	Al-Shamal SC
2022/10/08	Al-Duhail SC	3–0	Al-Rayyan SC
2022/10/08	Al-Arabi SC	1–0	Al-Gharafa SC
2022/10/15	Al-Gharafa SC	3–1	Al-Markhiya SC
2022/10/15	Al-Shamal SC	2–3	Al-Duhail SC
2022/10/15	Al-Rayyan SC	1–1	Al-Arabi SC

== Knockout round ==
=== Semi-finals ===
23 March 2023
18:45 AST (UTC+3)

Umm Salal SC	2–1	Al-Arabi SC
Abdellah Khafifi 87'; Yaseen Al-Bakhit 90+6'	Report	Ibrahim Kala 33'

Jassim bin Hamad Stadium, Doha
23 March 2023
18:45 AST (UTC+3)

Al-Duhail SC	3–1	Al Sadd SC
Ferjani Sassi 45+1', 54'; Ismaeel Mohammad 88'	Report	Ayoub El Kaabi 24'

Suheim bin Hamad Stadium, Doha

== Final ==
28 March 2023
12:00 AST (UTC+3)

Umm Salal SC	0–1	Al-Duhail SC
	Report	Nam Tae-hee 38'

Jassim bin Hamad Stadium, Doha
