= 2016–17 Qatar Stars League =

53rd season of top-tier football league in Qatar

Qatar Stars League
- Season: 2016–17
- Champions: Lekhwiya (5th title)
- Relegated: Muaither; Al-Wakrah
- AFC Champions League: Lekhwiya; Al Sadd; Al-Gharafa
- Matches: 168
- Goals: 525 (3.13 per match)
- Top goalscorer: (Morocco) Youssef El-Arabi (24 goals)
- Biggest home win: Lekhwiya 10–0 Al Shahaniya (21 December 2016)
- Biggest away win: Al-Rayyan 0–5 Al Sadd (7 December 2016)
- Highest scoring: Al-Sailiya 4–6 El Jaish (2 November 2016); Lekhwiya 10–0 Al Shahaniya (21 December 2016)
- Longest winning run: 9 matches Lekhwiya
- Longest unbeaten run: 20 matches Lekhwiya
- Longest winless run: 18 matches Al Shahaniya
- Longest losing run: 8 matches Muaither
- Highest attendance: 7,703; Al Sadd 4–1 Al-Rayyan (2 April 2017)
- Average attendance: 672
- All statistics correct as of 2 April 2017.

The 2016–17 Qatar Stars League was the 44th edition of top-level football championship in Qatar. The season began on 15 September 2016 and concluded on 27 April 2017.

Al-Rayyan were the defending champions, having won their eighth championship. Muaither and Al Shahaniya have entered as the two promoted teams from the 2015–16 Qatargas League.

== Teams ==
=== Stadia and locations ===
| Club | City/Town | Stadium | Head coach |
|---|---|---|---|
| Al Ahli | Doha | Hamad bin Khalifa Stadium | (Qatar) Yousuf Adam |
| Al-Arabi | Doha | Grand Hamad Stadium | (Brazil) Oswaldo de Oliveira |
| Al-Gharafa | Al Gharrafa | Thani bin Jassim Stadium | (Portugal) Pedro Caixinha |
| Al Kharaitiyat | Al Kharaitiyat | Al-Khor SC Stadium | (Tunisia) Ahmad Al-Ajlani |
| Al-Khor | Al Khor | Al-Khor SC Stadium | (France) Jean Fernandez |
| Al-Rayyan | Al Rayyan | Jassim bin Hamad Stadium | (Denmark) Michael Laudrup |
| Al Sadd | Doha | Jassim bin Hamad Stadium | (Portugal) Jesualdo Ferreira |
| Al-Sailiya | Al Sailiya | Hamad bin Khalifa Stadium | (Tunisia) Sami Trabelsi |
| Al Shahaniya | Al-Shahaniya | Grand Hamad Stadium | (Croatia) Igor Štimac |
| Al-Wakrah | Al Wakrah | Saoud bin Abdulrahman Stadium | (Tunisia) Kais Yaâkoubi |
| El Jaish | Duhail | Abdullah bin Khalifa Stadium | (France) Sabri Lamouchi |
| Lekhwiya | Doha | Abdullah bin Khalifa Stadium | (Algeria) Djamel Belmadi |
| Muaither | Muaither | Thani bin Jassim Stadium | (France) Philippe Burle |
| Umm Salal | Doha | Suheim bin Hamad Stadium | (Qatar) Mahmoud Jaber |

=== Managerial changes ===
| Team | Outgoing manager | Date of vacancy | Manner of departure | Pos. | Incoming manager | Date of appointment |
|---|---|---|---|---|---|---|
| Al Ahli | (Qatar) Yousuf Adam | 11 May 2016 | Mutual consent | Pre-season | (Croatia) Luka Bonačić | 11 May 2016 |
| Al Shahaniya | (Croatia) Luka Bonačić | 11 May 2016 | Mutual consent | Pre-season | (Tunisia) Fathi Al-Jabal | 17 June 2016 |
| Al-Arabi | (Italy) Gianfranco Zola | 28 June 2016 | Sacked | Pre-season | (Uruguay) Gerardo Pelusso | 28 June 2016 |
| Al-Rayyan | (Uruguay) Jorge Fossati | 26 September 2016 | Signed by Qatar | 4th | (Denmark) Michael Laudrup | 3 October 2016 |
| Al Ahli | (Croatia) Luka Bonačić | 28 October 2016 | Sacked | 7th | (Qatar) Yousuf Adam | 30 October 2016 |
| Al-Wakrah | (Uruguay) Mauricio Larriera | 29 November 2016 | Sacked | 13th | (Tunisia) Kais Yaâkoubi | 30 November 2016 |
| Umm Salal | (Turkey) Bülent Uygun | 14 December 2016 | Sacked | 7th | (Qatar) Mahmoud Jaber | 14 December 2016 |
| Al Shahaniya | (Tunisia) Fathi Al-Jabal | 25 December 2016 | Sacked | 12th | (Croatia) Igor Štimac | 28 December 2016 |

=== Foreign players ===
| Club | Player 1 | Player 2 | Player 3 | AFC Player | Former players |
|---|---|---|---|---|---|
| Al Ahli | (Argentina) Cristian Maidana | (Bahrain) Sayed Mohamed Adnan | (Tunisia) Yassine Chikhaoui | (Iran) Pejman Montazeri | (Democratic Republic of the Congo) Ndombe Mubele (Iran) Mojtaba Jabbari (Ivory Coast) Wilfried Yessoh |
| Al-Arabi | (Brazil) Paulinho | (Nigeria) Imoh Ezekiel | (Senegal) Moustapha Bayal Sall | (Chile) Luis Jiménez ^{1} | (Iran) Ashkan Dejagah |
| Al-Gharafa | (Ghana) Rashid Sumaila | (Hungary) Krisztián Németh | (Slovakia) Vladimír Weiss | (South Korea) Han Kook-young | |
| El Jaish | (Brazil) Lucas Mendes | (Brazil) Romarinho | (Mali) Seydou Keita | (Uzbekistan) Sardor Rashidov | (Morocco) Abderrazak Hamdallah |
| Al Kharaitiyat | (Brazil) Domingos | (Morocco) Anouar Diba | (Morocco) Rachid Tiberkanine | (Uzbekistan) Sanzhar Tursunov | (Australia) Erik Paartalu (Brazil) Tatá (Democratic Republic of the Congo) Jeremy Bokila (Morocco) Abdelmoula Berrabeh |
| Al-Khor | (Brazil) Madson | (Brazil) Welinton | (Morocco) Mouhcine Iajour | (Kuwait) Sultan Al Enezi | |
| Al-Rayyan | (Paraguay) Víctor Cáceres | (Spain) Sergio García | (Uruguay) Gonzalo Viera | (South Korea) Koh Myong-jin | |
| Al Sadd | (Algeria) Baghdad Bounedjah | (Algeria) Jugurtha Hamroun | (Spain) Xavi | (Iran) Morteza Pouraliganji | |
| Al-Sailiya | (Romania) Dragoș Grigore | (Romania) Valentin Lazăr | (Uzbekistan) Sanjar Shaakhmedov | (Uzbekistan) Temurkhuja Abdukholiqov | (Bahrain) Faouzi Aaish (Cameroon) Paul Alo'o (Cameroon) Raoul Loé |
| Al Shahaniya | (Iran) Mehrdad Pooladi | (Ivory Coast) Jean-Paul Késsé Amangoua | (Spain) Álvaro Mejía | (Iran) Rahim Zahivi | (Algeria) Kaled Gourmi (Algeria) Mohamed Tiaïba |
| Al-Wakrah | (Republic of the Congo) Prince Ibara | (Iraq) Ali Rehema | (Morocco) Mohsine Moutouali | (Syria) Sanharib Malki | (Paraguay) Pablo Zeballos (Uruguay) Pablo Olivera |
| Lekhwiya | (Morocco) Youssef El-Arabi | (Spain) Chico Flores | (Tunisia) Youssef Msakni | (South Korea) Nam Tae-hee | (Brazil) Edgar |
| Muaither | (Brazil) Bruno Aguiar | (Iraq) Ahmed Yasin | (Ivory Coast) Wilfried Yessoh | (Japan) Minori Sato | (Brazil) William Schuster (Democratic Republic of the Congo) Dioko Kaluyituka (Jordan) Mahmoud Za'tara (Mali) Ousmane Berthé (Uruguay) Matías Mier |
| Umm Salal | (Bahrain) Faouzi Aaish | (Brazil) Anderson Martins | (Ivory Coast) Yannick Sagbo | (Syria) Mahmoud Al-Mawas | (Brazil) Alan Henrique (Brazil) Alef (Jordan) Tha'er Bawab |

^1 Luis Jiménez has Palestinian citizenship and was counted as Asian player.

== League table ==
| Pos | Team | Pld | W | D | L | GF | GA | GD | Pts | Qualification or relegation |
|---|---|---|---|---|---|---|---|---|---|---|
| 1 | Lekhwiya (C) | 26 | 19 | 6 | 1 | 79 | 33 | +46 | 63 | 2018 AFC Champions League Group Stage |
| 2 | Al Sadd | 26 | 18 | 7 | 1 | 77 | 23 | +54 | 61 | 2018 AFC Champions League Group Stage |
| 3 | Al-Rayyan | 26 | 15 | 6 | 5 | 53 | 27 | +26 | 51 | Qualification to the 2018 AFC Champions League Qualifying play-off |
| 4 | El Jaish (Note: El Jaish were merged into Lekhwiya to form Al-Duhail after the 2016–17 season. As a result, Al-Gharafa, the league 5th place, entered the qualifying play-off.) | 26 | 13 | 6 | 7 | 45 | 40 | +5 | 45 | |
| 5 | Al-Gharafa | 26 | 12 | 4 | 10 | 42 | 43 | −1 | 40 | Qualification to the 2018 AFC Champions League Qualifying play-off |
| 6 | Umm Salal | 26 | 9 | 10 | 7 | 32 | 35 | −3 | 37 | |
| 7 | Al Kharaitiyat | 26 | 10 | 4 | 12 | 27 | 32 | −5 | 34 | |
| 8 | Al-Sailiya | 26 | 8 | 7 | 11 | 32 | 45 | −13 | 31 | |
| 9 | Al-Arabi | 26 | 8 | 4 | 14 | 39 | 56 | −17 | 28 | |
| 10 | Al Ahli | 26 | 7 | 6 | 13 | 33 | 45 | −12 | 27 | |
| 11 | Al-Khor | 26 | 6 | 7 | 13 | 25 | 38 | −13 | 25 | |
| 12 | Al Shahaniya | 26 | 3 | 13 | 10 | 30 | 53 | −23 | 22 | |
| 13 | Muaither (R) | 26 | 5 | 5 | 16 | 23 | 46 | −23 | 20 | Relegation to the 2017–18 Qatargas League |
| 14 | Al-Wakrah (R) | 26 | 2 | 9 | 15 | 29 | 50 | −21 | 15 | Relegation to the 2017–18 Qatargas League |

Updated to match(es) played on 15 April 2017. Source: RSSSF and Qatar Stars League
Rules for classification: 1) points; 2) goal difference; 3) number of goals scored.
(C) Champions; (R) Relegated

== Statistics ==
=== Top scorers ===
As of 15 April 2017

| Rank | Player | Club | Goals |
|---|---|---|---|
| 1 | (Morocco) Youssef El-Arabi | Lekhwiya | 24 |
| 2 | (Algeria) Baghdad Bounedjah | Al Sadd | 23 |
| 3 | (Qatar) Rodrigo Tabata | Al-Rayyan | 20 |
| 4 | (Ivory Coast) Yannick Sagbo | Umm Salal | 15 |
| 5 | (Brazil) Romarinho | El Jaish | 14 |
| 5 | (South Korea) Nam Tae-hee | Lekhwiya | 14 |
| 5 | (Uzbekistan) Sardor Rashidov | El Jaish | 14 |
| 8 | (Morocco) Mohsine Moutouali | Al-Wakrah | 11 |
| 8 | (Spain) Sergio García | Al-Rayyan | 11 |
| 10 | (Chile) Luis Jiménez | Al-Arabi | 10 |
| 10 | (Qatar) Meshal Abdullah | Al Ahli | 10 |
| 10 | (Slovakia) Vladimír Weiss | Al-Gharafa | 10 |
| 10 | (Spain) Xavi | Al Sadd | 10 |

=== Clean sheets ===
As of 15 April 2017

| Rank | Player | Club | Clean sheets |
|---|---|---|---|
| 1 | (Qatar) Saad Al Sheeb | Al Sadd | 11 |
| 2 | (Qatar) Omar Bari | Al-Rayyan | 9 |
| 3 | (France) Grégory Gomis | Al-Sailiya | 6 |
| 3 | (Qatar) Ahmed Soufiane | Al Kharaitiyat | 6 |
| 3 | (Qatar) Baba Malick | Umm Salal | 6 |
| 3 | (Qatar) Yousef Hassan | Al-Gharafa | 6 |
| 7 | (Qatar) Amine Lecomte | Lekhwiya | 5 |
| 7 | (Qatar) Saoud Al Khater | El Jaish | 5 |
