= 2023 Qatar Cup =

Tournament details
- Country: Qatar
- Dates: 9 February – 6 April 2023
- Teams: 4

Final positions
- Champions: Al-Duhail SC
- Runners-up: Al Sadd SC

Tournament statistics
- Matches played: 3
- Goals scored: 9 (3 per match)

The 2023 Qatar Cup, more widely known as the Crown Prince Cup, was the nineteenth edition of the Qatar Cup. It is played from February 9, 2023 – April 6, 2023. The cup is contested by the top four finishers of the 2021–22 Qatar Stars League.

== Participants ==
Team	2021–22 League Position
Al Sadd SC	Champions
Al-Duhail SC	Runners-up
Al-Wakrah SC	Third
Al-Arabi SC	Fourth

== Matches ==
=== Semi-finals ===
9 February 2023
14:40 AST

Al-Sadd SC	3–1	Al-Arabi SC
Jung Woo-young 43'; Baghdad Bounedjah 45'; Musab Kheder 79'	Report	Boualem Khoukhi 86'

Jassim bin Hamad Stadium, Doha
Referee: Abdulhadi Al Ruaile
9 February 2023
17:40 AST

Al-Duhail SC	2–1	Al-Wakrah SC
Michael Olunga 51'; Nam Tae-hee 72'	Report	Mohamed Benyettou 15'

Jassim bin Hamad Stadium, Doha
Referee: Khamis Al Marri

== Finals ==
6 April 2023
22:00 AST

Al Sadd SC	0–2	Al-Duhail SC
	Report	Michael Olunga 48'; Ferjani Sassi 53'

Jassim Bin Hamad Stadium, Al Rayyan
Referee: Abdulhadi Al Ruaile

== Bracket ==
Semi-finals
2023–02–9 – Doha
Al Sadd SC	3
Al-Arabi SC	1
2023–02–9 – Doha
Al-Duhail SC	2
Al-Wakrah SC	1

Final
2023–04–5 – Doha
Al Sadd SC	0
Al-Duhail SC	2
