= 2013 Qatar Crown Prince Cup =

كأس سمو ولي العهد

Tournament details
- Country: Qatar
- Dates: April 27 – May 4
- Teams: 4

The 2013 Qatar Crown Prince Cup was the 19th edition of the Qatar Crown Prince Cup and took place from April 27 to May 4. The competition was contested by the top four finishers in the 2012–13 Qatar Stars League.

== 2013 Participants ==
- Al-Sadd : 2012–13 Qatar Stars League champions
- Lekhwiya : 2012–13 Qatar Stars League runner up
- El Jaish : 2012–13 Qatar Stars League 3rd place
- Al Rayyan : 2012–13 Qatar Stars League 4th place

== Bracket ==
Semi-finals
2013-04-27 - Doha
(Qatar) Lekhwiya | 2
(Qatar) El Jaish | 1
2013-04-27 - Doha
(Qatar) Al Rayyan | 1
(Qatar) Al-Sadd | 3

Final
2013-05-04 - Doha
(Qatar) Lekhwiya | 3
(Qatar) Al-Sadd | 2
