= 2018 Qatar Cup =

Tournament details
- Country: Qatar
- Dates: April 21 – April 27
- Teams: 4

Final positions
- Champions: Al-Duhail (3rd title)
- Runners-up: Al Sadd

Tournament statistics
- Matches played: 3
- Goals scored: 14 (4.67 per match)
- Top goal scorer: (South Korea) Nam Tae-hee (3 goals)

The 2018 Qatar Cup, more widely known as the Crown Prince Cup, was the twenty-fourth edition of the Qatar Cup. It was played from April 21–27. The cup is contested by the top four finishers of the 2017–18 Qatar Stars League.

== Participants ==
The top four teams of the 2017–18 Qatar Stars League qualified for the tournament.

Team	2017–18 League Position
Al-Duhail	Champions
Al Sadd	Runners-up
Al-Rayyan	Third
Al-Gharafa	Fourth

== Matches ==
=== Semi-finals ===
21 April 2018

Al Sadd	2–2 (a.e.t.)	Al-Rayyan
Afif 21'; Ismail 28'		Moutouali 42'; Tabata 81'
Penalties
	4–2

Jassim Bin Hamad Stadium, Doha
22 April 2018

Al-Duhail	6–1	Al-Gharafa
Hussein 47'; Ismaeel 54'; Tae-hee 69', 79', 87'; El-Arabi 76'		Taremi 90+2' (pen.)

Abdullah bin Khalifa Stadium, Doha

== Finals ==
27 April 2018

Al Sadd	1–2	Al-Duhail
Al-Haydos 19'		Ismaeel 79'; El-Arabi 91' (pen.)

Jassim Bin Hamad Stadium, Doha

== Bracket ==
Semi-finals
2018–04–21 - Doha
Al Sadd (p)	2 (4)
Al-Rayyan	2 (2)
2018–04–22 - Doha
Al-Duhail	6
Al-Gharafa	1

Final
2018–04–27 - Doha
Al Sadd	1
Al-Duhail (a.e.t.)	2

== Top scorers ==
As of 21 April 2018

Rank	Player	Club	Goals
1	(South Korea) Nam Tae-hee	Al-Duhail	3
2	(Qatar) Ismaeel Mohammad	Al-Duhail	2
2	(Morocco) Youssef El-Arabi	Al-Duhail	2
