= Al Duhail SC =

Association football club in Qatar

Al-Duhail
- Full name: Al Duhail Sports Club
- Nickname: The Red Knights
- Founded: 1938; 88 years ago (as Al-Shorta); 2009; 17 years ago (as Lekhwiya); 2017; 9 years ago (as Al-Duhail)
- Ground: Abdullah bin Khalifa Stadium
- Capacity: 10,221
- Chairman: Khalifa bin Hamad bin Khalifa Al Thani
- Head coach: Djamel Belmadi
- League: Qatar Stars League
- 2025–26: Qatar Stars League, 5th of 12
- Website: www.duhailsc.qa
Home colours	Away colours

Al-Duhail Sports Club (Arabic: نادي الدحيل الرياضي), formerly Lekhwiya SC, is a Qatari sports club, It is the oldest football team in Qatar, being formed in 1938 as Al-Shorta. The club participates in the Qatar Stars League. Al-Duhail is based in the Duhail district in the city of Doha and plays its home games at Abdullah bin Khalifa Stadium. It is the first team in Qatari football to win the first division title on its debut season.

In April 2017, it was announced that the club would take over El Jaish SC and merge with it following the 2016–17 Qatar Stars League and be known as Al-Duhail Sports Club in a rebranding of Lekhwiya SC.

== History ==
In 1938, The club was founded as Al-Shorta. It was renamed Lekhwiya in 2009.

Upon the club's reformation, it was entered into the Qatari 2nd Division. It came fourth in the league on its first year before winning the next season in 2010.

In the club's first season in the Qatar Stars League, Lekhwiya finished at the top of the standings to win the 2010–11 Qatar Stars League. It was the first league title in the club's history. They also managed to reach the final of the 2010 Sheikh Jassem Cup, losing in the final to Al-Arabi.

Their official debut in a continental competition came on March 7, 2012, in the 2012 AFC Champions League. They won their first match against Al-Ahli of Saudi Arabia, with Nam Tae-Hee scoring the only goal and also scoring the first-ever goal for Lekhwiya in any regional competition.

In the 2011–12 Qatar Stars League season, Lekhwiya retained the league title with two games left to be played.

They inaugurated a new stadium Abdullah bin Khalifa Stadium, also known as Lekhwiya Sports Stadium, on February 15, 2013, in a match against Al Khor and won their third league title in the first season at the new stadium.

in April 2017 the club announced that they would take over El Jaish SC and rebranded the club into Al-Duhail SC.

At the end of the 2017–2018 Season the Club became the first club to hold all three domestic Titles the league, Qatar Cup and Emir Cup.

In 2024, it was one of the teams invited to take part in the first installment of the Equality Cup.

== Stadium ==
Abdullah bin Khalifa Stadium

Lekhwiya's stadium began construction in 2011. The first phase was completed in May 2012. The stadium was officially inaugurated on February 15, 2013, with the first match played being a Qatar Stars League fixture against Al Khor. The official seating capacity is 10,000, it is located in the ISF area of Doha.

== Colours and crest ==
=== Shirt sponsors and manufacturers ===
Period	Kit manufacture	Shirt sponsor
2009–11	Burrda	None
2011–19	Burrda	Masraf Rayan
2020–25	Puma	Masraf Rayan
2025–	Puma	Al Rayan Bank

=== Kit history ===
Home kit 2009	Home kit 2011

== Players ==
As of Qatar Stars League:

Note: Flags indicate national team as defined under FIFA eligibility rules; some limited exceptions apply. Players may hold more than one non-FIFA nationality.

No.	Pos.	Nation	Player
1	GK	QAT	Salah Zakaria
3	DF	BRA	Tuta
5	DF	QAT	Bassam Al-Rawi
6	MF	ITA	Marco Verratti
7	FW	FRA	Sekou Yansané
8	MF	QAT	Mubarak Shanan
9	FW	POL	Krzysztof Piątek
10	MF	QAT	Edmilson Junior
11	FW	QAT	Tahsin Jamshid
12	MF	QAT	Karim Boudiaf
13	GK	SDN	Jasim Sarour
18	DF	QAT	Sultan Al-Brake
19	FW	QAT	Almoez Ali (captain)

No.	Pos.	Nation	Player
21	DF	CMR	Jean-Charles Castelletto
22	DF	ITA	Ibrahima Bamba
23	MF	QAT	Assim Madibo
24	MF	FRA	Boubakary Soumaré
26	GK	QAT	Fahad Younes
27	DF	QAT	Abdalla Mugib
29	FW	QAT	Rashid Al-Abdulla
30	DF	FRA	Amidou Doumbouya
37	MF	QAT	Ziyad Fadi
39	MF	GER	Ismael Hedider
97	FW	ALG	Adam Belmadi
—	MF	QAT	Fares Said

=== Out on loan ===
Note: Flags indicate national team as defined under FIFA eligibility rules; some limited exceptions apply. Players may hold more than one non-FIFA nationality.

No.	Pos.	Nation	Player
4	DF	QAT	Yousef Aymen (at Al-Rayyan)
15	DF	QAT	Mohammed Ayash (at Lusail)
16	MF	QAT	Abdulaziz Mohammed (at Al-Markhiya)
20	MF	QAT	Abdullah Al-Ahrak (at Al-Shamal)
40	DF	QAT	Abdullah Sabet (at Muaither)
96	GK	QAT	Amir Hassan (at Lusail)

No.	Pos.	Nation	Player
—	GK	QAT	Galal Al-Sharqawi (at Qatar U23)
—	DF	QAT	Homam Ahmed (at Real Valladolid)
—	MF	QAT	Khaled Mohammed (at Lusail)
—	MF	QAT	Al-Hamzah Al-Saffar (at Muaither)
—	FW	QAT	Lotfi Madjer (at Al-Arabi)

== Personnel ==
=== Current technical staff ===
Position	Staff
Head coach	(Algeria) Djamel Belmadi
Assistant coach	(France) Guillaume Marie (France) Farès Bouzid
Goalkeeping coach	(France) Frédéric Roux
Physiotherapist	(Spain) Dario Lorenzo Fort (Algeria) Sabeur Zidi (Portugal) Pedro Silva
Masseur	(Tunisia) Anselmo Apolinario (Tunisia) Anderson Apolinario
Doctor	(Algeria) Mohamed Soltani

Last updated: 23 December 2022
Source: https://www.duhailsc.qa/main-team/

== Records and statistics ==
Last update: 14 January 2025.
Players whose names are in bold are still active with the club.

Most goals
#	Nat.	Name	Career	Goals	League Goals
1	(Kenya)	**Michael Olunga**	2020–	127	75
2	(South Korea)	Nam Tae-hee	2012–2019, 2021–2023	117	84
3	(Morocco)	Youssef El-Arabi	2016–2019	108	76
4	(Tunisia)	Youssef Msakni	2012–2021	99	73
5	Qatar	Almoez Ali	2016–	75	56
6	Qatar	Sebastián Soria	2012–2015	58	42
7	Qatar	Ismaeel Mohammad	2011–	56	37

== Reserves and academy ==
Reserves technical staff

Position	Staff
Manager	(Spain) Gerard Zaragoza
Fitness coach	(France) Didier Filipe
Goalkeeping coach	(Morocco) Karim Zaza
Director of football	(Qatar) Mohammad Bashir Sulaiti
Team administrator	(Qatar) Ali Hilal
General manager	(Qatar) Mohsen Al Yazidi

Source: Lekhwiya

U21 technical staff

Position	Staff
Manager	(Qatar) Hamdan Hamad
Assist. coach	(Tunisia) Saifuddin Komy
Assist. coach	(Slovakia) Peter Pollák
Goalkeeping coach	(Syria) Adam Abdelnasser Abbasi
Team administrator	(Qatar) Khalid Abdullah
General manager	(Qatar) Faisal Al Marri

Source: Al Raya

== Administrative staff ==
Board of Directors

Position	Staff
President	(Qatar) Khalifa bin Hamad bin Khalifa Al Thani
Vice Chairman	(Qatar) Khalifa Khamis Sulaiti
General Manager	(Qatar) Adnan Al Ali

Management (Football)

Position	Staff
Chief Executive Officer	(Qatar) Adnan Al Ali
Sports Officer	(Qatar) Faraj Saleh Al-Marri
Marketing Officer	(Qatar) Nadim Hussien Abdullah
Media Coordinator	(Qatar) Mohamed Bachir Al Sulaiti
Director of Football Team	(Qatar) Ismail Ahmed

== Honours ==
=== Domestic ===
- **Qatar Stars League**
  - Winners (8): 2010–11, 2011–12, 2013–14, 2014–15, 2016–17, 2017–18, 2019–20, 2022–23
- **Qatari Second Division**
  - Winners (1): 2009–10
- **Emir of Qatar Cup**
  - Winners (4): 2016, 2018, 2019, 2022
- **Qatar Cup**
  - Winners (4): 2013, 2015, 2018, 2023
- **Qatari Stars Cup**
  - Winners (2): 2022–23, 2024–25
- **Qatar Super Cup / Shiekh Jassem Cup**
  - Winners (2): 2015, 2016

=== Regional ===
- **Qatar–UAE Super Shield**
  - Runners-up (1): 2023–24

== Al-Duhail in Asia ==
Competition	Pld	W	D	L	GF	GA
AFC Champions League	71	35	15	21	123	95
Total	71	35	15	21	123	95

- **Q** = Qualification
- **GS** = Group stage
- **R16** = Round of 16
- **QF** = Quarter-final
- **SF** = Semi-final

AFC Champions League

Round	Country	Club	Home	Away
2012
GS	(Saudi Arabia)	Al-Ahli	1–0	0–3
GS	(United Arab Emirates)	Al-Nasr	1–2	1–2
GS	(Iran)	Sepahan	1–0	1–2
2013
GS	(United Arab Emirates)	Al-Shabab	2–1	1–3
GS	(Saudi Arabia)	Al-Ittifaq	0–0	2–0
GS	(Uzbekistan)	Pakhtakor	3–1	2–2
R16	(Saudi Arabia)	Al-Hilal	1–0	2–2
QF	(China)	Guangzhou Evergrande	0–2	1–4
2014
GS	(United Arab Emirates)	Al-Ain	1–2	0–5
GS	(Iran)	Tractor	0–0	1–0
GS	(Saudi Arabia)	Al-Ittihad	2–0	1–3
2015
GS	(Iran)	Persepolis F.C.	3–0	0–3
GS	(Saudi Arabia)	Al-Nassr FC	1–1	3–1
GS	(Uzbekistan)	Bunyodkor	1–0	1–0
R16	(Qatar)	Al-Sadd	2–2	2–1
QF	(Saudi Arabia)	Al-Hilal	2–2	1–4
2016
GS	(Iran)	Zob Ahan	0–1	0–0
GS	(Saudi Arabia)	Al-Nassr FC	4–0	1–1
GS	(Uzbekistan)	Bunyodkor	0–0	0–2
R16	(Qatar)	El Jaish SC	0–4	4–2
2017
GS	(United Arab Emirates)	Al Jazira	3–0	3–1
GS	(Saudi Arabia)	Al-Fateh	4–1	2–2
GS	(Iran)	Esteghlal Khuzestan	2–1	1–1
R16	(Iran)	Persepolis	0–1	0–0
2018
GS	(Iran)	Zob Ahan	3–1	1–0
GS	(Uzbekistan)	Lokomotiv Tashkent	3–2	2–1
GS	(United Arab Emirates)	Al Wahda	1–0	3–2
R16	(United Arab Emirates)	Al Ain	4–1	4–2
QF	(Iran)	Persepolis	1–0	1–3
2019
GS	(Saudi Arabia)	Al-Hilal	2–2	1–3
GS	(United Arab Emirates)	Al Ain	2–2	2–0
GS	(Iran)	Esteghlal	3–0	1–1
R16	(Qatar)	Al-Sadd	1–1	1–3
2020
GS	(Iran)	Persepolis	2–0	1–0
GS	(Saudi Arabia)	Al-Taawoun	0–1	0–2
GS	(United Arab Emirates)	Sharjah	2–1	2–4
2021
GS	(Iraq)	Al-Shorta	2–0	1–2
GS	(Saudi Arabia)	Al-Ahli	1–1	1–1
GS	(Iran)	Esteghlal	4–3	2–2
2022
GS	(Saudi Arabia)	Al-Taawon	1–2	4–3
GS	(Iran)	Sepahan	5–2	1–0
GS	(Uzbekistan)	Pakhtakor	3–2	3–0
R16	(Qatar)	Al-Rayyan	1–1	7–6 (p)
QF	(Saudi Arabia)	Al-Shabab	2–1
SF	(Saudi Arabia)	Al-Hilal	0–7
2023–24
GS	(Tajikistan)	Istiklol	2–0	0–0
GS	(Iran)	Persepolis	2–1	0–1
GS	(Saudi Arabia)	Al-Nassr	3–4	2–3

== Managerial history ==
- (Qatar) Khalifa Khamis (2008) (unofficial)
- (Qatar) Abdullah Saad (2008–2009) (unofficial)
- (Qatar) Abdullah Mubarak (2009–2010)
- (Algeria) Djamel Belmadi (2010–2012)
- (Belgium) Eric Gerets (2012–2014)
- (Denmark) Michael Laudrup (2014–2015)
- (Algeria) Djamel Belmadi (2015–2018)
- (Tunisia) Nabil Maâloul (2018–2019)
- (Portugal) Rui Faria (2019–2020)
- (Morocco) Walid Regragui (2020)
- (Tunisia) Hatem Almoadab (2020)
- (France) Sabri Lamouchi (2020–2021)
- (Portugal) Luís Castro (2021–2022)
- (Argentina) Hernán Crespo (2022–2023)
- (France) Christophe Galtier (2023–2025)
- (Algeria) Djamel Belmadi (2025–present)
