= Sheikh Jassim Cup =

Knockout association football tournament in Qatar

- Founded: 1977; 49 years ago
- Country: Qatar
- Number of clubs: 2
- Current champions: Al Sadd (15th title) (2019)
- Most championships: Al Sadd (15 titles)
- Current: 2025 Sheikh Jassim Cup

The Sheikh Jassim Cup (Arabic: كأس الشيخ جاسم) is an annual men's super cup competition in Qatari football held between the winner of the Qatar Stars League and the Emir of Qatar Cup.

== History ==
The inaugural Sheikh Jassim Cup was held in 1977. Prior to the 2014 Sheikh Jassim Cup, all 18 Qatari football clubs competed in the cup. Under this format, the teams were divided into four groups with the winners from each group qualifying for the semi-finals.

The cup serves as the opening event to the Qatar's football season. Al Sadd SC are the most successful team in the competition's history, having won the trophy on 15 occasions.

== Previous winners ==
- 1977: Al Sadd SC Draw Al Rayyan SC (penalties)
- 1978: Al Sadd SC 2–1 Qatar SC
- 1979: Al Sadd SC 1–0 Al Ahli SC (Doha)
- 1980: Al-Arabi SC 2–1 Al Ahli SC (Doha)
- 1981: Al Sadd SC
- 1982: Al-Arabi SC
- 1983: Qatar SC
- 1984: Qatar SC
- 1985: Al Sadd SC
- 1986: Al Sadd SC
- 1987: Qatar SC
- 1988: Al Sadd SC
- 1989: Al-Wakrah SC
- 1990: Al Sadd SC
- 1991: Al-Wakrah SC
- 1992: Al Rayyan SC
- 1993: Wasn't held
- 1994: Al-Arabi SC
- 1995: Qatar SC
- 1996: Al Shamal SC
- 1997: Al Sadd SC
- 1998: Al-Wakrah SC 2–0 Al Ahli
- 1999: Al Sadd SC 3–2 Al-Taawun
- 2000: Al Rayyan SC 2–0 Al-Taawun
- 2001: Al Sadd SC
- 2002: Al-Khor SC 1–0 Qatar SC (asdet)
- 2003: Al Shabab 2–1 Al-Wakrah SC (aet)
- 2004: Al-Wakrah SC 1–1 Qatar SC (aet, 3–1 pens)
- 2005: Al-Gharafa SC 2–1 Al Ahli SC
- 2006: Al Sadd SC 2–0 Al Rayyan SC
- 2007: Al-Gharafa SC 4–2 Al-Sailiya SC (aet)
- 2008: Al-Arabi SC 3–0 Al Rayyan SC
- 2009: Umm Salal SC 2–0 Al-Khor SC
- 2010: Al-Arabi SC 1–0 Lekhwiya SC
- 2011: Al-Arabi SC 3–2 Umm Salal
- 2012: Al Rayyan SC 1–0 Al-Sadd
- 2013: Al Rayyan SC 2–0 Al Kharaitiyat
- 2014: Al Sadd SC 3–2 Lekhwiya SC
- 2015: Lekhwiya SC 4–1 Al Sadd SC
- 2016: Lekhwiya SC 2–0 Al Rayyan SC
- 2017: Al Sadd SC 4–2 Al-Duhail
- 2018: Al Rayyan SC 1–1 Al-Duhail SC (5–3 penalties)
- 2019: Al Sadd SC 1–0 Al-Duhail
- NOTES:

1. The 2015 edition was played in January 2016 due to both teams competing in 2015 AFC Champions League

== Role of honour ==
Club	Champions
Al-Sadd	15
Al-Arabi	6
Al-Rayyan	5
Al-Wakrah	4
Qatar SC	4
Al-Gharafa	2
Lekhwiya	2
Al-Shamal	1
Al-Khor	1
Umm-Salal	1
Al-Mu'aidar	1
