= 2018 Emir of Qatar Cup =

Emir Cup 2018 (Qatar)
Tournament details
- Country: Qatar
- Dates: 10/4/2018 – 19/5/2018
- Teams: 17 teams

Final positions
- Champions: Al-Duhail
- Runners-up: Al-Rayyan

Tournament statistics
- Matches played: 16 matches

The 2018 Emir of Qatar Cup was the 46th edition of the Qatari cup tournament in men's football. It was played by the first and second level divisions of the Qatari football league structure. The cup winner is guaranteed a place in the 2019 AFC Champions league.

The draw of the tournament was held on 11 April 2018.

Note: all matches in Qatar time (GMT+3).

== Preliminary round ==
v

v

v

Tuesday 10/04/2018

time: 6:30 PM

Muaither 0–2 Al-Shamal

== First round ==
v

v

v

v

v

v

Monday 23/04/2018

time: 5:15 PM

Al-Mesaimeer 0–0 (3–1 p) Al-Ahli (match 1)

time: 8:00 PM

Al-Wakrah 3–2 Qatar SC (match 2)

Tuesday 24/04/2018

time: 5:15 PM

Al-Shamal 1–4 Al-Markhiya (match 3)

time: 8:00 PM

Al-Shahania 1–3 Al-Kharaitiyat (match 4)

== Second round ==
v

v

v

v

v

v

Saturday 28/04/2018

time: 5:15 PM

Al-Khor 1–1 (10–9 p) Al-Markhiya (match 5)

time: 8:00 PM

Umm Salal 5–0 Al-Kharaitiyat (match 6)

Sunday 29/04/2018

time: 5:15 PM

Al-Sailiya 0–1 Al-Mesaimeer (match 7)

time: 8:00 PM

Al-Arabi 4–0 Al-Wakrah (match 8)

== Quarter-finals ==
v

v

v

v

v

v

Thursday 03/05/2018

time 5:15 PM

Al-Sadd 4–0 Al-Khor (match 9)

time: 8:00 PM

Al-Duhail 1–0 Umm Salal (match 10)

Friday 04/05/2018

time: 5:15 PM

Al-Gharafa 1–0 Al-Mesaimeer (match 11)

time: 8:00 PM

Al-Rayyan 3–0 Al-Arabi (match 12)

== Semi-finals ==
v

v

v

Friday 11/05/2018

time: 7:00 PM

Al-Sadd 0–1 Al-Duhail (match 13)

Saturday 12/05/2018

time: 7:00 PM

Al-Gharafa 0–3 Al-Rayyan (match 14)

== Final ==
Saturday 19/05/2018

time: 10:15 PM

Al-Duhail 2–1 Al-Rayyan
