= 2011–12 Lekhwiya SC season =

Lekhwiya
2011–12 season
- Chairman: Sheikh Abdullah al Thani
- Manager: Djamel Belmadi
- Stadium: Qatar SC Stadium
- Qatar Stars League: 1st
- Emir of Qatar Cup: Quarter-Finals
- Crown Prince Cup: Semi-finals
- Champions League: Group stage
- Top goalscorer: League: Nam Tae-Hee (5); All: Nam Tae-Hee (7)
Home colours	Away colours

The 2011–12 Lekhwiya SC season was Lekhwiya's second season in the Qatar Stars League, an association football league in Qatar. Lekhwiya are competing in the 2012 AFC Champions League after qualifying by winning the 2010–11 Qatar Stars League.

== Season overview ==
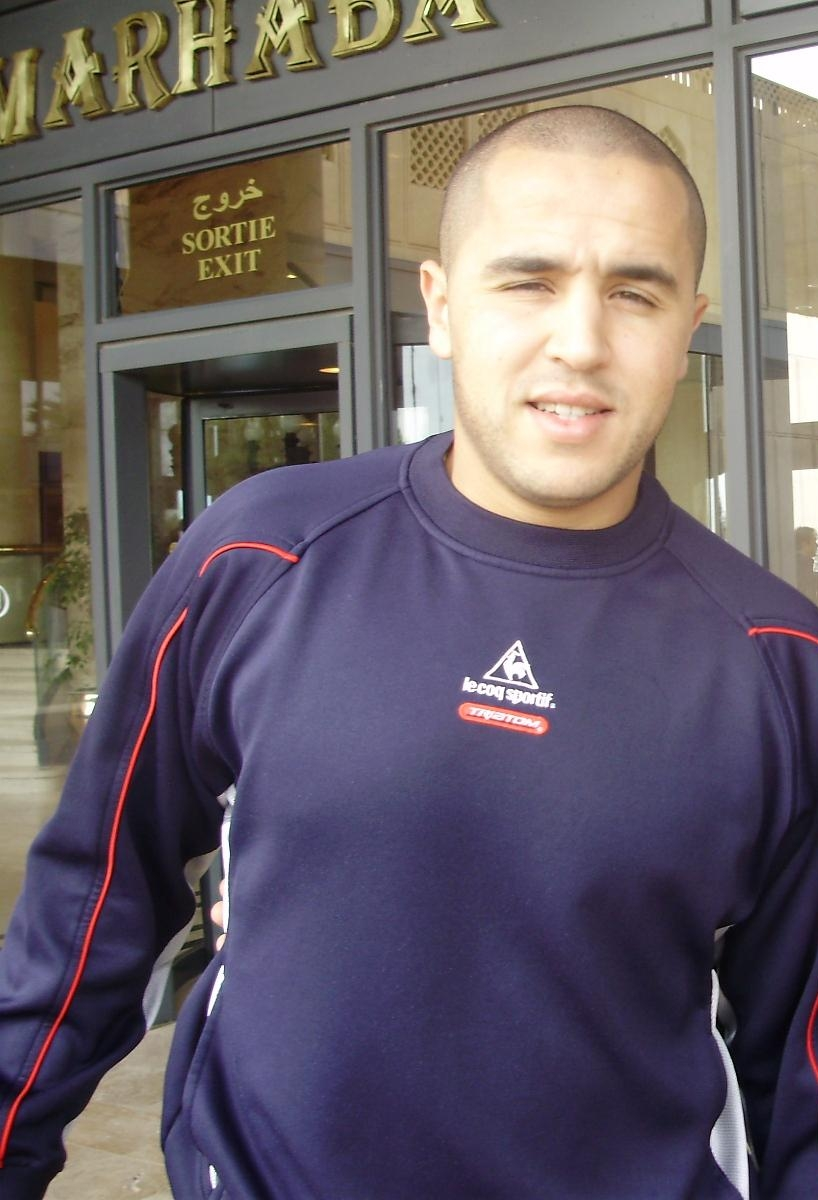
Madjid Bougherra scored a goal on his debut

Lekhwiya commenced their summer transfer activity by signing Iraqi national Nashat Akram from Al Wakrah on July 1. They made arguably one of the biggest summer signings of all the Qatari clubs by signing Algerian international defender Madjid Bougherra from Rangers for £1.7m in August. Big names who departed Lekhwiya included Jasur Hasanov and Abdeslam Ouaddou, both to Qatar SC.

Lekhwiya set up a training camp in UAE. They played Al Ahli in a warm-up match, winning 1-0 courtesy of a Mohammed Razak goal in the 74th minute.

They put pen-to-paper for a sponsorship deal with Masraf Al Rayyan, who will be the first and only sponsors of Lekhwiya, on May 11, 2011.

They participated in the 2011 Qatari Stars Cup, being seeded in group A; the more difficult of the two groups. They advancing through to the semi-finals with 4 wins and 1 loss in the group stage. They faced Al Wakrah in the semi-finals, losing 2–3, with Bakari Koné and Moumouni Dagano scoring a goal each.

Lekhwiya won the league title on March 26, 2012, after a hard-fought draw against Al Arabi, with Ali Afif scoring the third-minute goal which proved crucial. This was their second successive title on Djamel Belmadi. They were crowned champions with two games yet to be played. Their league record at the time was 12 wins, 6 draws, and 2 losses.

Lekhwiya were drawn in Group C in the 2012 AFC Champions League, featuring Sepahan, Al-Nasr and Al-Ahli. They selected Jassim Bin Hamad Stadium as their home venue for their champions league matches, as it was the venue of the reigning champions, Al-Sadd. It is the first-ever regional competition Lekhwiya has ever participated in.

On 7 March 2012, Lekhwiya played their first match against Al-Ahli at home. They won the match 1–0 in front of a large home crowd consisting of many supporters of both clubs. Despite Moumouni Dagano missing a penalty early on, Nam Tae-Hee helped his team record a victory by scoring a late goal from midfield.

On 21 March 2012, they played against Al-Nasr in Dubai. Moumouni Dagano scored the only goal in a 2–1 loss. The match was marred by controversy as Lekhwiya had 2 goals ruled offside in the late stages of the game, only to have Amara Diané score the winning goal in additional time.

== Squad list ==
Players and squad numbers last updated on 3 September 2011.
Note: Flags indicate national team as has been defined under FIFA eligibility rules. Players may hold more than one non-FIFA nationality.

No.	Nat.	Position	Name	Date of birth (age)	Signed from
Goalkeepers
22	(Qatar)	GK	Baba Malick	9 March 1983 (aged 28)	(Qatar) Umm Salal SC
40	(Morocco)	GK	Amine Lecomte	26 April 1990 (aged 21)	(France) Sochaux
23	(Qatar)	GK	Abdulla Aziz Al-Shammari	26 April 1990 (aged 21)	(Qatar) Unknown
33	(Qatar)	GK	Ahmed Ali Hatemi	1 January 1980 (aged 31)	(Qatar) Al Sailiya
Defenders
2	(Qatar)	CB	Saleh Mousa	1 January 1979 (aged 32)	(Qatar) Al Arabi
6	(Qatar)	CB	Dame Traoré	19 May 1986 (aged 25)	(France) Valenciennes FC
9	(North Korea)	LB	Jon Kwang-Ik	5 April 1988 (aged 23)	(North Korea) Amrokgang
11	(Qatar)	RB	Talal Al Qahtani	15 December 1987 (aged 23)	(Qatar) Al-Rayyan SC
13	(Qatar)	RB	Mousa Majid Al Allaq	30 June 1986 (aged 25)	Qatar SC
21	(Qatar)	RB	Khalid Fareed	7 January 1988 (aged 23)	(Qatar) Al-Rayyan SC
92	(Qatar)	LB	Khalid Muftah	2 July 1992 (aged 19)	(Qatar) Al-Wakrah SC
17	(Qatar)	CB	Mohammed Musa	23 March 1986 (aged 25)	(Qatar) Umm Salal SC
24	(Algeria)	CB	Madjid Bougherra	7 October 1982 (aged 28)	(Scotland) Rangers
Midfielders
3	(Sudan)	RW	Mohammed Muddather	13 April 1988 (aged 23)	(Qatar) Al-Wakrah SC
7	(Qatar)	LW	Adel Lami	13 November 1985 (aged 25)	(Qatar) Umm Salal SC
8	(Morocco)	RW	Anouar Diba	27 February 1983 (aged 28)	(Qatar) Al-Wakrah SC
10	(Qatar)	AM	Waleed Jassem	2 August 1986 (aged 25)	Qatar SC
12	(Qatar)	DM	Karim Boudiaf	19 September 1990 (aged 20)	(France) AS Nancy Lorraine
25	(Iraq)	AM	Nashat Akram	12 September 1984 (aged 27)	(Qatar) Al-Wakrah SC
25	(South Korea)	AM	Nam Tae-Hee	3 July 1991 (aged 20)	(France) Valenciennes FC
30	(Qatar)	DM	Luiz Ceará	13 January 1989 (aged 22)	(Brazil) FC Atlético Cearense
70	(Qatar)	RW	Ismaeel Mohammad	5 April 1990 (aged 21)	(Qatar) Youth system
88	(Qatar)	CM	Hussain Ali Shehab	23 June 1985 (aged 26)	(Qatar) Al Ahli SC
89	(Qatar)	DM	Meshaal Mejbel	7 August 1989 (aged 22)	(Qatar) Unknown
Forwards
5	(Qatar)	ST	Mohammed Razak	4 April 1986 (aged 25)	(Qatar) Muaither SC
14	(Ivory Coast)	RW	Bakari Koné	17 September 1981 (aged 29)	(France) Olympique de Marseille
28	(Burkina Faso)	ST	Moumouni Dagano	1 January 1981 (aged 30)	(Qatar) Al-Khor SC
29	(Ivory Coast)	ST	Lassina Diaby	5 August 1992 (aged 19)	Qatar SC
81	(Ivory Coast)	LW	Kanga Akalé	7 March 1981 (aged 30)	(France) RC Lens
15	(Qatar)	LW	Ali Afif	20 January 1988 (aged 23)	(Qatar) Al Sadd SC
15	(Ivory Coast)	SS	Aruna Dindane	26 November 1980 (aged 30)	(France) RC Lens
94	(Algeria)		Adel Habib Beldi	9 July 1994 (aged 17)	(Qatar) Aspire Academy

=== Reserve team squad information ===
N	Pos.	Nat.	Name	Age	Since	App	Goals	Ends	Transfer fee	Notes
18	DF	(Qatar)	Salman Al Shammari	12 September 1983 (aged 28)	2011	18	0	N/A	N/A	Plays for the reserve team
20	DF	(Qatar)	Yasser Hatam	18 September 1986 (aged 24)	2010	27	0	N/A	N/A	Plays for the reserve team
66	DF	(Qatar)	Ali Al Nouamani	20 September 1986 (aged 24)	2010	31	0	N/A	N/A	Plays for the reserve team
77	MF	(Qatar)	Khamis Mohammed	22 December 1987 (aged 23)	2010	31	7	N/A	N/A	Plays for the reserve team
99	DF	(Qatar)	Assad Mohamed	19 July 1980 (aged 31)	2010	20	0	N/A	N/A	Plays for the reserve team

- Last updated: 26 March 2012
- Source: QSL
- Ordered by squad number.
- Notes: Reserve league appearances and goals listed

== Competitions ==
=== Overview ===
Competition	Record								Started round	Final position / round	First match	Last match
Competition	G	W	D	L	GF	GA	GD	Win %	Started round	Final position / round	First match	Last match
Qatar Stars League	22	12	7	3	36	16	+20	54.55	Matchday 1	Winner	16 September 2011	13 April 2012
Emir of Qatar Cup	1	0	0	1	1	2	−1	0.00	Quarter-Finals		5 May 2012	
Crown Prince Cup	1	0	0	1	2	4	−2	0.00	Semi-finals		21 April 2012	
Champions League	6	2	0	4	5	9	−4	33.33	Group stage		7 March 2012	15 May 2012
Total	30	14	7	9	44	31	+13	46.67				

Updated to match played 15 May 2012
Source: Competitions

=== Qatar Stars League ===
==== League table ====
Pos	Team	Pld	W	D	L	GF	GA	GD	Pts	Qualification or relegation
1	Lekhwiya (C)	22	12	7	3	36	16	+20	43	2013 AFC Champions League Group stage
2	El Jaish	22	12	5	5	48	24	+24	41	2013 AFC Champions League Group stage
3	Al-Rayyan	22	10	9	3	49	26	+23	39	2013 AFC Champions League Group stage
4	Al Sadd	22	10	6	6	35	24	+11	36	
5	Al-Khor	22	9	5	8	30	29	+1	32	

Updated to match(es) played on 13 April 2012. Source: RSSSF
Rules for classification: 1) points; 2) goal difference; 3) number of goals scored.
(C) Champions

==== Results summary ====
Overall								Home						Away					
Pld	W	D	L	GF	GA	GD	Pts	W	D	L	GF	GA	GD	W	D	L	GF	GA	GD
22	12	7	3	36	16	+20	43	7	2	2	21	8	+13	5	5	1	15	8	+7

Last updated: 10 April 2021.
Source: Competitive matches

==== Results by round ====
Round	1	2	3	4	5	6	7	8	9	10	11	12	13	14	15	16	17	18	19	20	21	22
Ground																						
Result	W	W	D	D	W	W	L	D	W	D	W	L	W	W	W	W	D	W	W	D	D	L
Position	3	1	1	2	2	1	2	2	1	1	1	2	2	2	1	1	1	1	1	1	1	1

Updated to match(es) played on 10 April 2021. Source: Competitive matches
A = Away; H = Home; W = Win; D = Draw; L = Loss

==== Matches ====
Win Draw Loss

16 September 2011 Round 1	Al Wakrah	0–1	Lekhwiya	Wakrah
18:30		Report	Madjid Bougherra 29'	Stadium: Al-Wakrah Stadium; Referee: Abdullah Al Baloushi

23 September 2011 Round 2	Al Ahli	0–4	Lekhwiya	Doha
18:30		Report	Luiz Ceará 14'; Nashat Akram 76'; Ismaeel Mohammad 90+3', 90+7'	Stadium: Al-Ahly Stadium

2 October 2011 Round 3	Lekhwiya	1–1	El Jaish	Doha
18:30	Anouar Diba 50'	Report	Adriano 90+1'	Stadium: Qatar SC Stadium

16 October 2011 Round 4	Al Gharafa	0–0	Lekhwiya	Al Gharafa
20:00		Report		Stadium: Al-Gharafa Stadium

21 October 2011 Round 5	Al Khor	0–2	Lekhwiya	Al Khor
18:00		Report	Bakari Koné 6'; Lassina Diaby 34'	Stadium: Al-Khawr Stadium

29 October 2011 Round 6	Lekhwiya	3–0	Qatar SC	Doha
20:00	Adel Lami 2'; Bakari Koné 12'; Hussain Ali Shehab 30'	Report		Stadium: Qatar SC Stadium

20 November 2011 Round 7	Lekhwiya	0–1	Al Sadd	Doha
20:30		Report	Mesaad Al-Hamad 39'	Stadium: Qatar SC Stadium

24 November 2011 Round 8	Umm Salal	0–0	Lekhwiya	Doha
20:30		Report		Stadium: Qatar SC Stadium

1 December 2011 Round 9	Lekhwiya	3–0	Al Arabi	Al Gharafa
19:30	Luiz Ceará 12'; Adel Lami 45+1'; Anouar Diba 73'	Report		Stadium: Al-Gharafa Stadium

1 January 2012 Round 10	Al Kharitiyath	1–1	Lekhwiya	Doha
17:30	Yahia Kébé 61'	Report	Adel Lami 6'	Stadium: Jassim Bin Hamad Stadium

7 January 2012 Round 11	Lekhwiya	2–1	Al Rayyan	Al Gharafa
18:15	Aruna Dindane 47'; Madjid Bougherra 51'	Report	Cho Yong-Hyung 61'	Stadium: Al-Gharafa Stadium

14 January 2012 Round 12	Lekhwiya	1–2	Al Wakrah	Al Gharafa
18:15	Mohammed Razak 68'	Report	Saïd Boutahar 5', 80'	Stadium: Al-Gharafa Stadium

19 January 2012 Round 13	Lekhwiya	1–0	Al Ahli	Al Gharafa
16:15	Nam Tae-Hee 62'	Report		Stadium: Al-Gharafa Stadium

26 January 2012 Round 14	El Jaish	2–3	Lekhwiya	Al-Rayyan
16:30	Wagner Renan Ribeiro 10'; Adriano 65'	Report	Bakari Koné 7'; Madjid Bougherra 69'; Dame Traoré 90+2'	Stadium: Ahmed bin Ali Stadium

4 February 2012 Round 15	Lekhwiya	2–0	Al Gharafa	Al Gharafa
16:30	Nam Tae-Hee 12'; Lassina Diaby 85'	Report		Stadium: Al-Gharafa Stadium

9 February 2012 Round 16	Lekhwiya	4–1	Al Khor	Al Gharafa
16:30	Nam Tae-Hee 45+1', 65'; Ismaeel Mohammed 80'; Lassina Diaby 84'	Report	Hassan Abdel-Fattah 29'	Stadium: Al-Gharafa Stadium

16 February 2012 Round 17	Qatar SC	0–0	Lekhwiya	Doha
18:30		Report		Stadium: Qatar SC Stadium

11 March 2012 Round 18	Al Sadd	1–2	Lekhwiya	Doha
20:15	Khalfan Ibrahim 76'	Report	Dagano 56'; Nam Tae-Hee 82'	Stadium: Jassim Bin Hamad Stadium

15 March 2012 Round 19	Lekhwiya	3–1	Umm Salal	Al Gharafa
20:15	Ali Afif 24'; Moumouni Dagano 38', 79'	Report	Magno Alves 48'	Stadium: Al-Gharafa Stadium

25 March 2012 Round 20	Al Arabi	1–1	Lekhwiya	Doha
20:30	Abdulaziz Hatem 83'	Report	Ali Afif 3'	Stadium: Grand Hamad Stadium

8 April 2012 Round 21	Lekhwiya	1-1	Al Kharitiyath	Al Gharafa
18:30	Razak 51'	Report	Jaycee John 39'	Stadium: Al-Gharafa Stadium

13 April 2012 Round 22	Al Rayyan	3-1	Lekhwiya	Al Rayyan
19:30	Ismail 62'; Alves 82'; Tabata 83' (pen.)	Report	Shehab 20'	Stadium: Ahmed bin Ali Stadium

=== Emir of Qatar Cup ===
5 May 2012 Quarter-Finals	Lekhwiya	1–2	Al-Gharafa
17:30	Dagano 42'		Hassan 9'; Tardelli 34'

=== Crown Prince Cup ===
21 April 2012 Semi finals	Lekhwiya	2–4	Al-Sadd	Doha
18:45	Baba Malick (red card) 38'; Nam Tae-Hee 52' (pen.); Madjid Bougherra 84'	Report	Mamadou Niang 35' (pen.), 38', 94'; Khalfan Ibrahim 74'	Stadium: Suhaim bin Hamad Stadium; Referee: Fredy Fautrel (France)

=== 2012 AFC Champions League ===
==== Group stage ====
===== Group C =====
Pos	Team	Pld	W	D	L	GF	GA	GD	Pts	Qualification	SEP	AHL	NAS	LEK
1	(Iran) Sepahan	6	4	1	1	9	4	+5	13	Advance to knockout stage	—	2–1	1–0	2–1
2	(Saudi Arabia) Al-Ahli	6	3	1	2	10	6	+4	10	Advance to knockout stage	1–1	—	3–1	3–0
3	(United Arab Emirates) Al-Nasr	6	2	0	4	6	11	−5	6 (Note: Al-Nasr and Lekhwiya are ranked by their head-to-head record (Al-Nasr: 6 pts; Lekhwiya: 0 pts).)		0–3	1–2	—	2–1
4	(Qatar) Lekhwiya	6	2	0	4	5	9	−4	6		1–0	1–0	1–2	—

Source: WorldFootball.net
Notes:

7 March 2012 1	Lekhwiya (Qatar)	1–0	(Saudi Arabia) Al-Ahli	Doha
18:30 UTC+03:00	Nam Tae-Hee 74'	Report		Stadium: Jassim Bin Hamad Stadium; Attendance: 4,227; Referee: Ali Abdulnabi (Bahrain)

21 March 2012 2	Al-Nasr (United Arab Emirates)	2–1	(Qatar) Lekhwiya	Dubai
20:00 UTC+04:00	Diané 37', 90+2'	Report	Dagano 42'	Stadium: Al-Maktoum Stadium; Attendance: 4,720; Referee: Kim Dong-Jin (Korea Republic)

3 April 2012 3	Sepahan (Iran)	2–1	(Qatar) Lekhwiya	Isfahan
20:00 UTC+04:30	Hosseini 10'; Correa 89'	Report	Afif 55'	Stadium: Foolad Shahr Stadium; Attendance: 6,732; Referee: Ryuji Sato (Japan)

18 April 2012 4	Lekhwiya (Qatar)	1–0	(Iran) Sepahan	Doha
19:00 UTC+03:00	Koné 90+1'	Report		Stadium: Jassim Bin Hamad Stadium; Attendance: 3,423; Referee: Malik Abdul Bashir (Singapore)

1 May 2012 5	Al-Ahli (Saudi Arabia)	3–0	(Qatar) Lekhwiya	Jeddah
20:45 UTC+03:00	Jaizawi 9'; Simões 61'; Al-Jassim 90+1'	Report		Stadium: Prince Abdullah al-Faisal Stadium; Attendance: 10,214; Referee: Masaaki Toma (Japan)

15 May 2012 6	Lekhwiya (Qatar)	1–2	(United Arab Emirates) Al-Nasr	Doha
19:00 UTC+03:00	Diaby 38'	Report	Diané 55'; H. Abdullah 57'	Stadium: Jassim Bin Hamad Stadium; Attendance: 643; Referee: Ravshan Irmatov (Uzbekistan)

== Squad information ==
=== Playing statistics ===
No.	Pos	Nat	Player	Total		Qatar Stars League		Emir of Qatar Cup		AFC CL1		Crown Prince Cup	
No.	Pos	Nat	Player	Apps	Goals	Apps	Goals	Apps	Goals	Apps	Goals	Apps	Goals
22	GK	(Qatar) QAT	Baba Malick	24	0	19	0	0	0	5	0	0	0
23	GK	(Qatar) QAT	Abdulla Aziz Al-Shammari	0	0	0	0	0	0	0	0	0	0
33	GK	(Qatar) QAT	Ahmed Ali Hatemi	0	0	0	0	0	0	0	0	0	0
40	GK	(Morocco) MAR	Amine Lecomte	4	0	3	0	0	0	1	0	0	0
2	DF	(Qatar) QAT	Saleh Mousa	7	0	7	0	0	0	0	0	0	0
3	DF	(Sudan) SDN	Mohammed Muddather	1	0	0	0	0	0	1	0	0	0
6	DF	(Qatar) QAT	Dame Traoré	23	1	17	1	0	0	6	0	0	0
9	DF	(North Korea) PRK	Jon Kwang-Ik	0	0	0	0	0	0	0	0	0	0
13	DF	(Qatar) QAT	Mousa Majid Al Allaq	14	0	12	0	0	0	2	0	0	0
16	DF	(Qatar) QAT	Khalid Muftah	12	0	7	0	0	0	5	0	0	0
17	DF	(Qatar) QAT	Mohammed Musa	24	0	19	0	0	0	5	0	0	0
19	DF	(Qatar) QAT	Ahmed Yasser	3	0	1	0	0	0	2	0	0	0
24	DF	(Algeria) ALG	Madjid Bougherra	23	3	18	3	0	0	5	0	0	0
7	MF	(Qatar) QAT	Adel Lami	23	3	20	3	0	0	3	0	0	0
12	MF	(Qatar) QAT	Karim Boudiaf	24	0	19	0	0	0	5	0	0	0
25	MF	(South Korea) KOR	Nam Tae-Hee	16	6	10	5	0	0	6	1	0	0
30	MF	(Qatar) QAT	Luiz Ceará	23	2	18	2	0	0	5	0	0	0
70	MF	(Qatar) QAT	Ismaeel Mohammad	18	3	17	3	0	0	1	0	0	0
88	MF	(Qatar) QAT	Hussain Ali Shehab	24	2	20	2	0	0	4	0	0	0
5	FW	(Qatar) QAT	Mohammed Razak	21	2	18	2	0	0	3	0	0	0
14	FW	(Ivory Coast) CIV	Bakari Koné	22	4	16	3	0	0	6	1	0	0
28	FW	(Burkina Faso) BFA	Moumouni Dagano	12	4	6	3	0	0	6	1	0	0
29	FW	(Ivory Coast) CIV	Lassina Diaby	12	4	8	3	0	0	4	1	0	0
81	FW	(Ivory Coast) CIV	Kanga Akalé	1	0	1	0	0	0	0	0	0	0
15	FW	(Qatar) QAT	Ali Afif	9	3	4	2	0	0	5	1	0	0
94	FW	(Algeria) ALG	Adel Habib Beldi	1	0	1	0	0	0	0	0	0	0
	MF	(Qatar) QAT	Waleed Jassem	3	0	3	0	0	0	0	0	0	0
Players transferred out during the season
8	MF	(Morocco) MAR	Anouar Diba	6	2	6	2	0	0	0	0	0	0
25	MF	(Iraq) IRQ	Nashat Akram	8	1	8	1	0	0	0	0	0	0
15	FW	(Ivory Coast) CIV	Aruna Dindane	4	1	4	1	0	0	0	0	0	0

Last updated: 26 January 2021
Source: fr.soccerway.com

=== Goalscorers ===
Includes all competitive matches. The list is sorted alphabetically by surname when total goals are equal.

No.	Nat.	Player	Pos.	QSL	QEC	CPC	CL 1	TOTAL
25	(South Korea)	Nam Tae-Hee	MF	5	0	1	1	7
28	(Burkina Faso)	Moumouni Dagano	FW	3	1	0	1	5
14	(Ivory Coast)	Bakari Koné	FW	3	0	0	1	4
29	(Ivory Coast)	Lassina Diaby	FW	3	0	0	1	4
24	(Algeria)	Madjid Bougherra	DF	3	0	1	0	4
7	(Qatar)	Adel Lami	MF	3	0	0	0	3
70	(Qatar)	Ismaeel Mohammad	MF	3	0	0	0	3
15	(Qatar)	Ali Afif	MF	2	0	0	1	3
88	(Qatar)	Hussain Ali Shehab	MF	2	0	0	0	2
5	(Qatar)	Mohammed Razak	FW	2	0	0	0	2
8	(Morocco)	Anouar Diba	MF	2	0	0	0	2
30	(Qatar)	Luiz Ceará	MF	2	0	0	0	2
6	(Qatar)	Dame Traoré	DF	1	0	0	0	1
25	(Iraq)	Nashat Akram	MF	1	0	0	0	1
15	(Ivory Coast)	Aruna Dindane	FW	1	0	0	0	1
Own Goals				0	0	0	0	0
Totals				36	1	2	5	44

Last updated: 26 March 2012
Source: KoraMania – Lekhwiya 2011/12

== Transfers ==
=== In ===
Date	Pos	Player	From club	Transfer fee	Source
1 July 2011	DF	(North Korea) Jon Kwang-Ik	(North Korea) Amrokgang	Free transfer	
1 July 2011	MF	Nashat Akram	Al-Wakrah SC	Free transfer	
1 July 2011	MF	(Qatar) Adel Lami	Umm Salal SC	Free transfer	
1 July 2011	FW	(Ivory Coast) Lassina Diaby	Qatar SC	Free transfer	
1 July 2011	MF	(Jordan) Rami Fayez	Al-Rayyan SC	Free transfer	
1 July 2011	GK	(Qatar) Ahmed Ali Hatimi	Al-Sailiya SC	Free transfer	
1 July 2011	MF	(Morocco) Anouar Diba	Al-Wakrah SC	Free transfer	
10 August 2011	DF	(Algeria) Madjid Bougherra	(Scotland) Rangers	Free transfer	
15 November 2011	FW	(Ivory Coast) Kanga Akalé	(France) RC Lens	Free transfer	
23 December 2011	MF	(South Korea) Nam Tae-Hee	(France) Valenciennes FC	Free transfer	
31 January 2012	FW	(Qatar) Ali Afif	Al Sadd SC	Free transfer	
31 January 2012	DF	(Sudan) Mohammed Muddather	Al-Wakrah SC	Free transfer	
31 January 2012	FW	(Burkina Faso) Moumouni Dagano	Al-Khor SC	Free transfer	

=== Out ===
Date	Pos	Player	To club	Transfer fee	Source
1 July 2011	MF	(Qatar) Tresor Kangambu	Al-Wakrah SC	Loan for one year	
8 August 2011	DF	(Morocco) Abdeslam Ouaddou	Qatar SC	Free transfer	
24 August 2011	MF	(Uzbekistan) Jasur Hasanov	Qatar SC	Loan for one year	
15 December 2011	DF	(Qatar) Mohammed al-Haj	Umm Salal SC	Free transfer	
25 December 2011	MF	(Jordan) Rami Fayez	Umm Salal SC	Free transfer	
28 December 2011	MF	(Morocco) Anouar Diba	Al-Wakrah SC	Free transfer	
29 December 2011	MF	(Iraq) Nashat Akram	Al-Wakrah SC	Free transfer	
30 December 2011	FW	(Ivory Coast) Kanga Akalé	(Greece) Panetolikos	Free transfer	
31 January 2012	FW	(Ivory Coast) Aruna Dindane	Al-Gharafa SC	Free transfer	

== Club ==
=== Coaching staff ===
Position	Staff
Manager	(Algeria) Djamel Belmadi
Assistant manager	(France) Jean-Christian Lang
Head of technical staff	(France) Christian Janoh
Fitness coach	(France) Jean Emmanuel
Goalkeeping coach	(Algeria) Amor Bouras
Director of football	(Qatar) Waleed Bakhit
Physiotherapists	(Brazil) Anderson Marcelo (Brazil) Anselmo Cesar
Head of age groups	(Qatar) Ali Khalil

Last updated: March 2012
Source: Lekhwiya

=== Management ===
Position	Staff
President	(Qatar) Sheikh Abdullah al Thani
General secretary	(Qatar) Bilal Waleed Al Hitmi
Sports administrator	(Qatar) Ahmed Khalil Abbasi
Media officer	(Qatar) Adnan Al Ali
Public official	(Qatar) Mubarak Al Mutawa
Administration & finance	(Qatar) Salwa Al Emadi

Last updated: March 2012
Source: Lekhwiya

=== Grounds ===
Ground (capacity and dimensions)	Qatar SC Stadium (20,000 / )
Training ground	Qatar SC Stadium
