= List of Al-Duhail SC players =

Below is a list of notable footballers who have played for Al-Duhail SC. Generally, this means players that have played 100 or more league matches for the club. However, some players who have played fewer matches are also included; this includes players that have had considerable success either at other clubs or at international level, as well as players who are well remembered by the supporters for particular reasons.

Players are listed in alphabetical order according to the date of their first-team official debut for the club. Appearances and goals are for first-team competitive matches only. Substitute appearances included. Statistics accurate as of 7 May 2021.

== List of Al-Duhail SC players ==
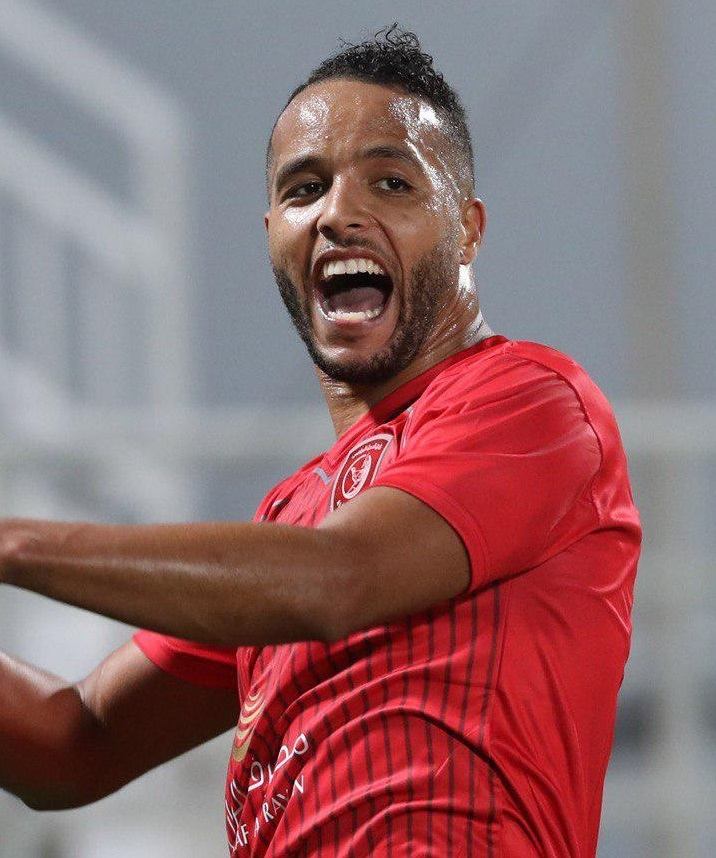
Youssef El-Arabi.

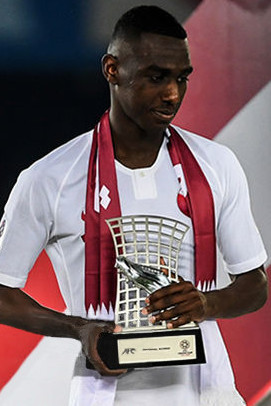
Almoez Ali.

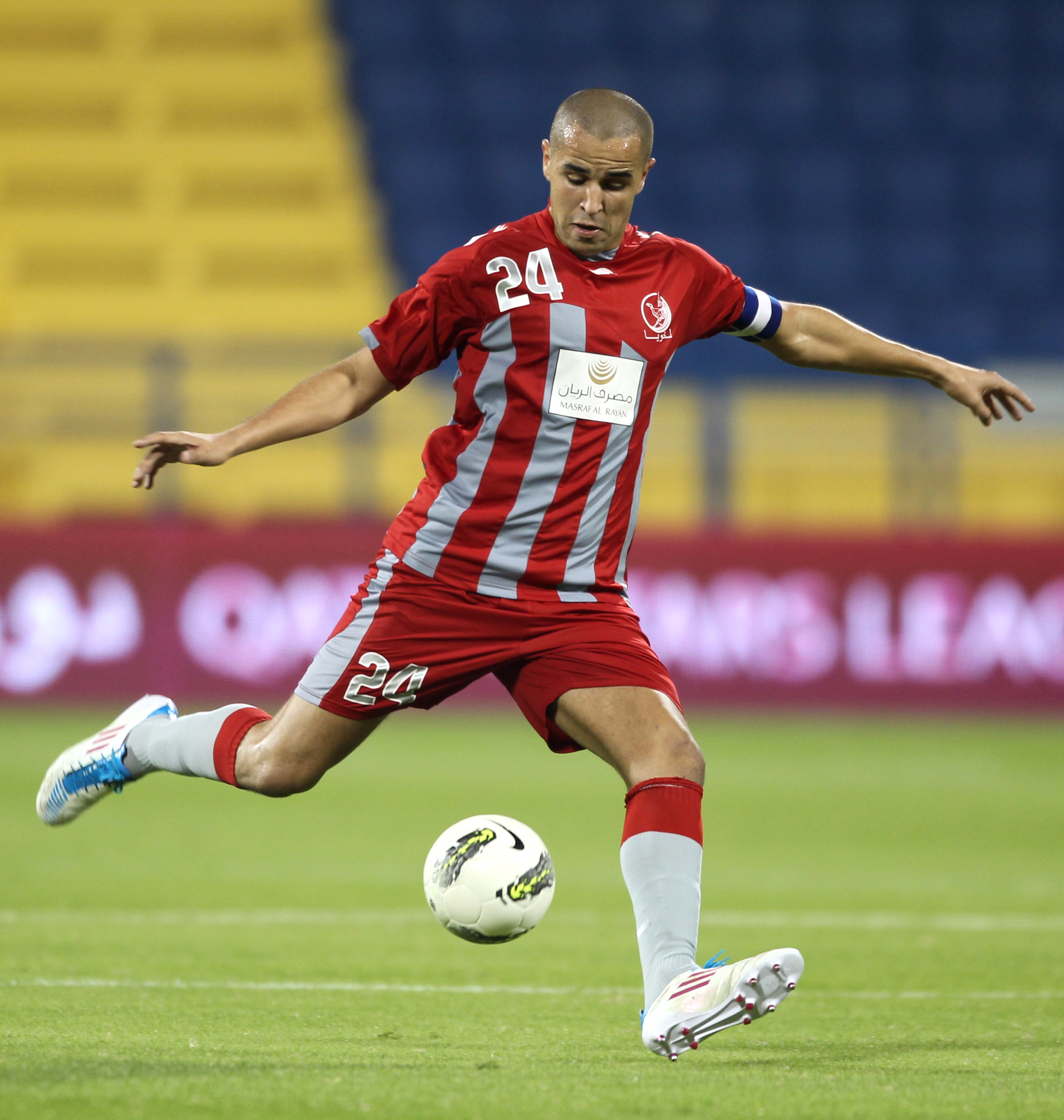
Madjid Bougherra.

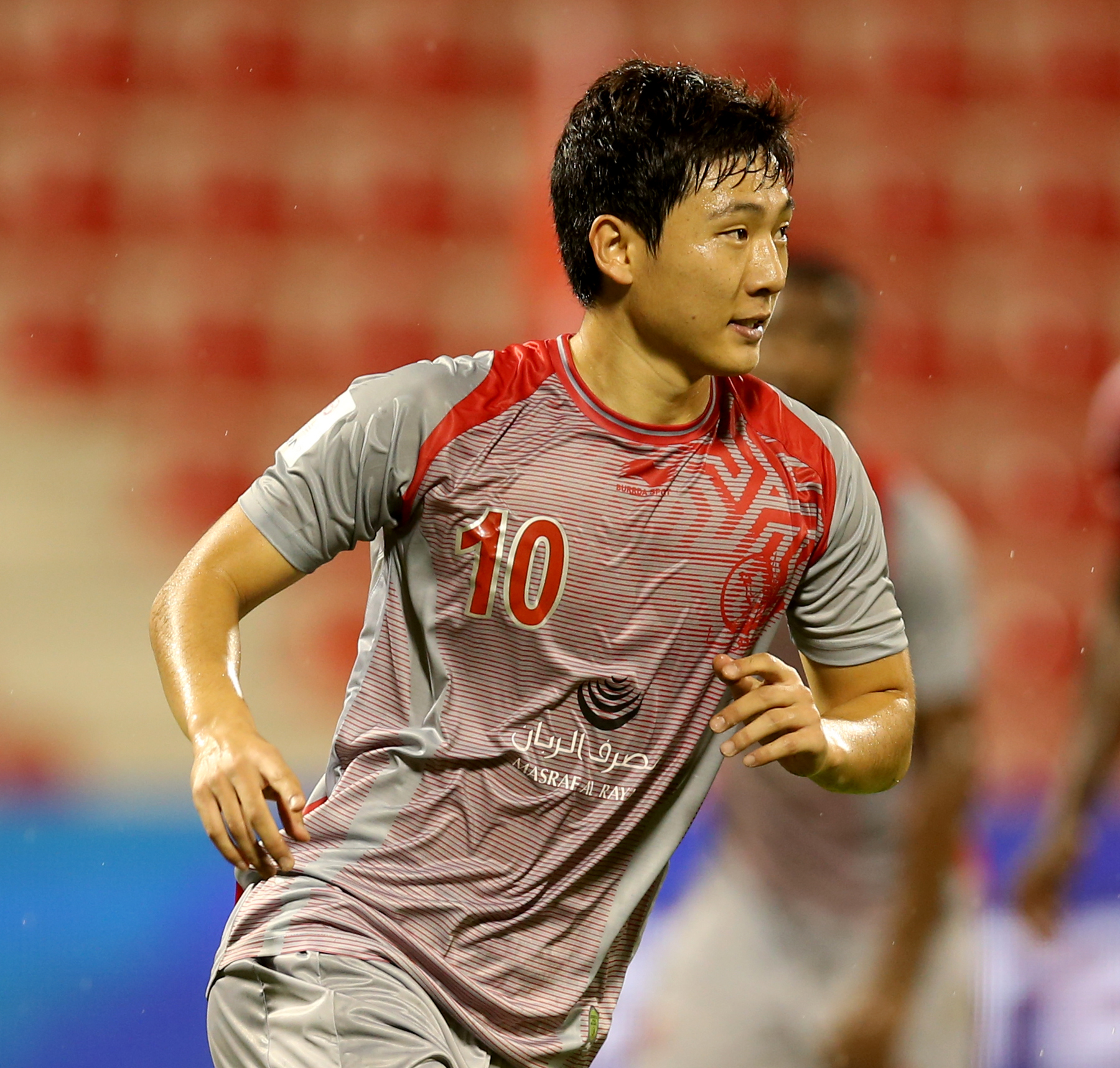
Nam Tae-hee.

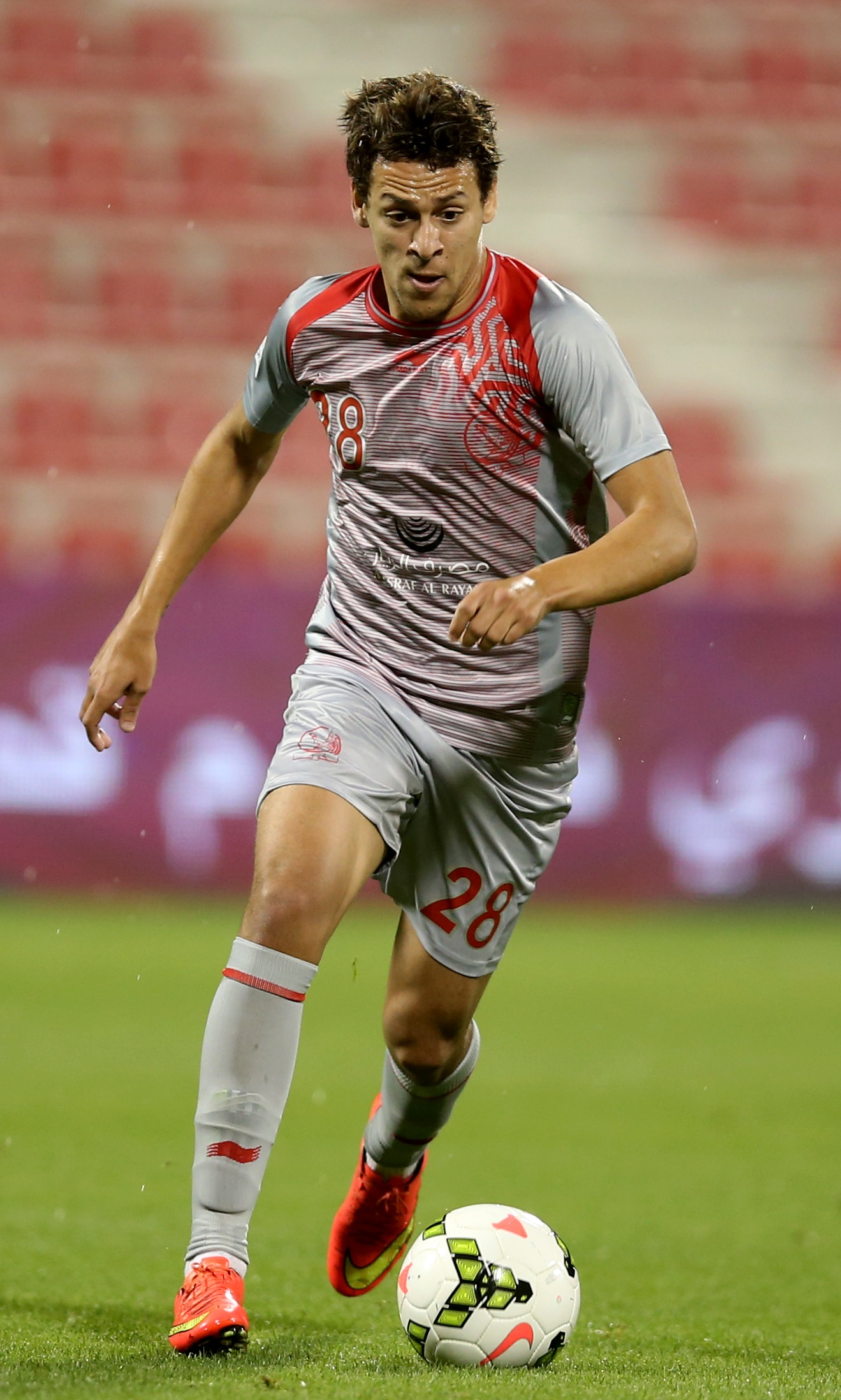
Youssef Msakni.

| Name | Nat. | Position | Inter career | Appearances | Goals | Notes |
|---|---|---|---|---|---|---|
| Adel Ahmed | (Qatar) | FW | 2012–15 | 25 | 5 | |
| Kanga Akalé | (Ivory Coast) | FW | 2011 | 2 | 0 | |
| Nashat Akram | (Iraq) | MF | 2011 | 8 | 1 | |
| Mousa Al Allaq | (Qatar) | FW | 2010–12 | 30 | 0 | |
| Youssef El-Arabi | (Morocco) | FW | 2016–19 | 97 | 108 | |
| Madjid Bougherra | (Algeria) | DF | 2011–14 | 77 | 5 | |
| Ahmed Yasser | (Qatar) | DF | 2011–21 | 77 | 3 | |
| Qasem Burhan | (Qatar) | GK | 2016–17 | 6 | 0 | |
| Chico Flores | (Spain) | DF | 2014–17 | 83 | 9 | |
| Moumouni Dagano | (Burkina Faso) | FW | 2012 | 12 | 4 | |
| Issiar Dia | (Senegal) | FW | 2012–14 | 39 | 7 | |
| Lassina Diaby | (Ivory Coast) | FW | 2009–16 | 15 | 4 | |
| Anouar Diba | (Morocco) | MF | 2011–12 | 6 | 2 | |
| Aruna Dindane | (Ivory Coast) | FW | 2010–12 | 23 | 5 | |
| Edgar Bruno da Silva | (Brazil) | FW | 2017 | 3 | 2 | |
| Rami Fayez | (Qatar) | DF | 2011 | 2 | 0 | |
| Jasur Hasanov | (Uzbekistan) | MF | 2010–11 | 27 | 5 | |
| Ivanildo | (Brazil) | GK | 2015–16 | 4 | 0 | |
| Waleed Jassem | (Qatar) | MF | 2009–13 | 14 | 0 | |
| Dioko Kaluyituka | (Democratic Republic of the Congo) | FW | 2016 | 8 | 5 | |
| Tresor Kangambu | (Qatar) | FW | 2010–17 | 130 | 0 | |
| Nasser Khalfan | (Qatar) | MF | 2013–18 | 12 | 1 | |
| Adel Lami | (Qatar) | MF | 2011–14 | 66 | 4 | |
| Amine Lecomte | (Qatar) | GK | 2010–20 | 209 | 0 | |
| Baba Malick | (Qatar) | GK | 2010–13 | 58 | 0 | |
| Ahmed Abdul Maqsoud | (Qatar) | MF | 2012–17 | 27 | 0 | |
| Mourad Meghni | (Algeria) | MF | 2012 | 4 | 0 | |
| Abdulrahman Mohammed | (Qatar) | MF | 2014–17 | 32 | 0 | |
| Abdelrahman Moustafa | (Qatar) | MF | 2016–17 | 9 | 0 | |
| Mohammed Muddather | (Qatar) | FW | 2011–13 | 7 | 0 | |
| Khalid Muftah | (Qatar) | MF | 2010–21 | 190 | 10 | |
| Ali Nasser | (Qatar) | DF | 2009–10 | 26 | 0 | |
| Abdeslam Ouaddou | (Morocco) | DF | 2010–11 | 26 | 2 | |
| Khaled Radhwan | (Qatar) | DF | 2014–17 | 26 | 0 | |
| Mohammed Razak | (Qatar) | FW | 2010–15 | 67 | 16 | |
| Dame Traoré | (Qatar) | DF | 2009–18 | 127 | 9 | |
| Vladimír Weiss | (Slovakia) | FW | 2014–16 | 59 | 23 | |
| Sebastián Soria | (Qatar) | FW | 2012–15 | 91 | 56 | |
| Hazem Shehata | (Qatar) | MF | 2015–19 | 19 | 0 | |
| Hussain Shehab | (Qatar) | MF | 2009–15 | 61 | 1 | |
| Mohammed Al-Bakri | (Qatar) | GK | 2015–present | 19 | 0 | |
| Salah Zakaria | (Qatar) | GK | 2021–present | 23 | 0 | |
| Ali Malolah | (Qatar) | DF | 2020–present | 11 | 0 | |
| Mohammed Musa | (Qatar) | DF | 2009–present | 176 | 8 | |
| Bassam Al-Rawi | (Qatar) | DF | 2017–present | 92 | 3 | |
| Toby Alderweireld | (Belgium) | DF | 2021–present | 0 | 0 | |
| Sultan Al-Brake | (Qatar) | DF | 2017–present | 84 | 1 | |
| Ali Afif | (Qatar) | MF | 2012–present | 139 | 21 | |
| Luiz Júnior | (Qatar) | MF | 2010–present | 281 | 13 | |
| Edmilson Junior | (Belgium) | MF | 2018–present | 85 | 29 | |
| Abdullah Al-Ahrak | (Qatar) | MF | 2017–present | 73 | 6 | |
| Ferjani Sassi | (Tunisia) | MF | 2021–present | 0 | 0 | |
| Assim Madibo | (Qatar) | MF | 2016–present | 61 | 0 | |
| Nam Tae-hee | (South Korea) | MF | 2012–19 & 2021–present | 160 | 73 | |
| Karim Boudiaf | (Qatar) | MF | 2010–present | 285 | 23 | |
| Ismaeel Mohammad | (Qatar) | FW | 2011–present | 248 | 39 | |
| Youssef Msakni | (Tunisia) | FW | 2013–present | 164 | 89 | |
| Michael Olunga | (Kenya) | FW | 2021–present | 22 | 20 | |
| Mohammed Muntari | (Qatar) | FW | 2015–present | 94 | 27 | |
| Almoez Ali | (Qatar) | FW | 2016–present | 153 | 44 | |

Nationalities are indicated by the corresponding FIFA country code.

== List of all-time appearances ==
This list of all-time appearances for Al-Duhail SC contains football players who have played for Al-Duhail SC and have managed to accrue 100 or more appearances.

Bold: still playing competitive football in Al-Duhail SC. (Note: Some players statistics only Qatar Stars League and AFC Champions League. Statistics correct as of game against Al-Rayyan on May 10, 2021.)

| # | Name | Position | League | Cup | Others^{1} | Asia^{2} | TOTAL | Honours | | | | |
| # | Name | Position | League | Cup | Others^{1} | Asia^{2} | TOTAL | League | Cup | Others | Asia | TOTAL |
|---|---|---|---|---|---|---|---|---|---|---|---|---|
| 1 | (Qatar) **Karim Boudiaf** | CM / DM | 213 | 0 | 0 | 73 | 286 | 7 | 3 | 5 | – | 15 |
| 2 | (Qatar) **Luiz Júnior** | CM / DM / LM | 202 | 0 | 0 | 67 | 269 | 7 | 3 | 5 | – | 15 |
| 3 | (South Korea) **Nam Tae-hee** | RW / LW / AM | 160 | 14 | 23 | 61 | 258 | 5 | 2 | 4 | – | 11 |
| 4 | (Qatar) **Ismaeel Mohammad** | RW / LW / AM | 182 | 0 | 0 | 61 | 243 | 6 | 3 | 5 | – | 14 |
| 5 | (Qatar) **Ali Afif** | LM / LW / CF | 155 | 0 | 0 | 46 | 201 | 5 | 3 | 5 | – | 13 |
| 6 | (Qatar) Amine Lecomte | GK | 135 | 0 | 0 | 57 | 192 | 7 | 3 | 3 | – | 13 |
| 7 | (Qatar) Khalid Muftah | LB / LM | 142 | 0 | 0 | 54 | 196 | 6 | 2 | 5 | – | 13 |
| 8 | (Qatar) **Mohammed Musa** | CB / RB | 205 | 0 | 0 | 68 | 273 | 6 | 3 | 5 | – | 14 |
| 9 | (Tunisia) **Youssef Msakni** | LW / AM / SS | 119 | 0 | 0 | 45 | 164 | 5 | 2 | 5 | – | 12 |
| 10 | (Qatar) Tresor Kangambu | RB / RW / RM | 124 | 0 | 0 | 36 | 160 | 4 | 1 | 1 | – | 6 |
| 11 | (Qatar) **Almoez Ali** | AM / SS / CF | 98 | 12 | 10 | 36 | 156 | 3 | 2 | 2 | – | 7 |
| 12 | (Qatar) Dame Traoré | CB | 97 | 0 | 0 | 30 | 127 | 5 | 1 | 5 | – | 11 |

^{1} ^{Includes the Qatar Cup and Sheikh Jassim Cup.} ^{2} ^{Includes the Cup Winners' Cup, Champions League and FIFA Club World Cup.}

== Players from Al-Duhail SC to Europe ==
| Player | Pos | Club | League | Transfer fee | Source |
|---|---|---|---|---|---|
| (Morocco) Youssef El-Arabi | FW | Olympiacos | Super League Greece | Free transfer | |
