= List of Qatar international footballers born outside Qatar =

This is a list of footballers who have played international football for the Qatari national football team and that were born outside Qatari territory.

The following players:

1. have played at least one game for the full (senior male) Qatar international team.
2. were born outside Qatar.

== Key ==
*	Current internationals. Statistics are correct as of 18 December 2021.
Caps	Appearances
Pos	Positions
GK	Goalkeeper
DF	Defender
MF	Midfielder
FW	Forward

== List of players ==
As of 18 December 2021

Place of birth	Player	Pos	Caps	Goals	First cap	Last cap	Notes	Ref
Senegal (Dakar)	Abdulla Koni	DF	59	4	19 September 1997	14 January 2009		
Kuwait (Kuwait City)	Saoud Ghanem	MF	13	1	22 September 1998	24 August 2008		
KSA (Rafha)	Saad Al-Shammari	DF	77	7	23 January 2000	3 September 2010		
Sudan (Khartoum)	Mirghani Al Zain	MF	5	0	24 July 2001	16 November 2007		
Mauritania (Nouakchott)	Sayed Ali Bechir	FW	59	21	13 October 2001	26 May 2009		
Kuwait (Kuwait City)	Wesam Rizik	MF	111	7	30 December 2001	13 November 2014		
Senegal (Dakar)	Mohamed Saqr	GK	59	0	19 November 2003	1 April 2009		
Sudan (Khartoum)	Magid Mohamed	FW	80	13	21 December 2003	24 March 2016		
KSA (Riyadh)	Majdi Siddiq	MF	59	4	13 February 2004	31 May 2015		
Iraq (Baghdad)	Ali Mejbel Fartoos	FW	6	1	31 May 2004	1 March 2006		
Senegal (Dakar)	Qasem Burhan	GK	79	0	21 July 2004	19 January 2015		
Kuwait (Sulaibiya)	Talal Al-Bloushi	MF	78	1	29 July 2005	13 October 2013		
Kuwait (Al Ahmadi)	Adel Lami	MF	32	5	11 October 2005	9 September 2013		
KSA (Medina)	Yusef Ahmed	FW	54	9	6 September 2006	29 September 2016		
Uruguay (Paysandú)	Sebastián Soria	FW	123	40	15 November 2006	28 March 2017		
Senegal (Cordina)	Baba Malick	GK	5	0	24 March 2007	11 January 2013		
Kuwait (Kuwait City)	Ibrahim Majid	DF	100	6	25 June 2007	13 June 2017		
Tanzania (Zanzibar)	Rajab Hamza	GK	7	0	28 October 2007	7 November 2012		
Brazil (Londrina)	Fábio César Montezine	MF	33	11	10 January 2008	14 November 2012		
Brazil (Poções)	Marcone Amaral Costa	DF	39	1	10 January 2008	11 January 2013		
Brazil (Nova Iguaçu)	Emerson Sheik	FW	3	0	4 March 2008	26 March 2008		
Yemen (Yafa)	Mohammed Al Yazeedi	MF	21	0	14 November 2008	31 December 2010		
Senegal (Dakar)	Ibrahima Nadiya	MF	14	1	28 March 2009	17 November 2009		
Ghana (Accra)	Mohammed Kasola	DF	67	7	3 March 2010	13 June 2017		
Ghana (Kumasi)	George Kwasi Semakor	DF	6	0	10 August 2010	16 December 2010		
Guinea (Conakry)	Omar Bari	GK	6	0	12 October 2010	10 October 2017		
Ghana (Accra)	Lawrence Quaye	MF	31	0	18 November 2010	5 January 2013		
Iraq (Basra)	Hussain Shehab	MF	19	1	29 March 2011	30 March 2015		
Ghana (Accra)	Mohammed Razak	FW	16	3	16 September 2011	7 January 2014		
Bahrain (Manama)	Ali Assadalla	MF	55	12	23 January 2012	10 December 2021		
Sudan (Al-Fashir)	Mosaab Mahmoud	DF	19	0	7 March 2013	26 March 2015		
KSA (Mecca)	Abdulgadir Ilyas Bakur	FW	18	4	17 April 2013	11 June 2015		
Egypt (Cairo)	Ahmed Alaaeldin	FW	45	1	15 November 2013	18 December 2021		
Sudan (Khartoum)	Almoez Ali	FW	80	39	21 December 2013	18 December 2021		
Algeria (Bou Ismaïl)	Boualem Khoukhi	DF	97	20	21 December 2013	18 December 2021		
France (Metz)	Dame Traoré	DF	8	0	21 December 2013	28 August 2015		
France (Rueil-Malmaison)	Karim Boudiaf	MF	106	5	21 December 2013	18 December 2021		
Brazil (Jaguaruana)	Luiz Martin Carlos Júnior	DF	27	0	21 December 2013	6 June 2017		
Sudan (Khartoum)	Mohamed Salah Elneel	FW	2	0	21 December 2013	2 December 2019		
Egypt (Alexandria)	Ahmed Abdul Maqsoud	MF	41	2	30 May 2014	14 November 2017		
Syria (Aleppo)	Ismail Mardanli	FW	2	0	30 May 2014	14 July 2014		
KSA (Mecca)	Abdurahman Abubakar	DF	3	1	9 September 2014	30 March 2015		
Ghana (Kumasi)	Mohammed Muntari	FW	45	12	27 December 2014	18 December 2021		
DR Congo (Kinshasa)	Tresor Kangambu	MF	11	0	27 December 2014	25 August 2016		
France (Reims)	Amine Lecomte	GK	18	0	26 March 2015	1 September 2016		
Brazil (Araçatuba)	Rodrigo Tabata	MF	18	4	24 March 2016	13 June 2017		
Portugal (Algueirão–Mem Martins)	Pedro Miguel	DF	76	1	29 March 2016	3 December 2021		
Jordan (Amman)	Rami Fayez	DF	1	0	17 January 2017	17 January 2017		
Sudan (Khartoum)	Musab Kheder	DF	28	0	9 March 2017	18 December 2021		
Sudan (Khartoum)	Assim Madibo	MF	41	0	23 August 2017	18 December 2021		
Iraq (Baghdad)	Bassam Al-Rawi	DF	49	2	11 November 2017	15 December 2021		
Egypt (Aswan)	Ahmed Fatehi	MF	12	0	14 November 2017	4 December 2020		
Egypt (Cairo)	Hazem Shehata	MF	1	0	14 December 2017	14 December 2017		
Egypt (Cairo)	Abdelrahman Moustafa	MF	4	0	7 September 2018	14 November 2019		
Somalia (Mogadishu)	Yusuf Abdurisag	FW	13	1	5 September 2019	9 October 2021		
Sudan (Khartoum)	Meshaal Barsham	GK	13	0	13 November 2020	18 December 2021		
Iraq (Baghdad)	Mohammed Waad	MF	16	0	13 November 2020	18 December 2021		
Iraq (Baghdad)	Ahmed Suhail	DF	1	0	4 July 2021	4 July 2021		

=== By country of birth ===
Country	Total
Sudan	8
Brazil	5
Egypt	5
Ghana	5
Iraq	5
Kuwait	5
Saudi Arabia	5
Senegal	5
France	3
Algeria	1
Bahrain	1
DR Congo	1
Guinea	1
Jordan	1
Mauritania	1
Portugal	1
Somalia	1
Syria	1
Tanzania	1
Uruguay	1
Yemen	1
Indonesia	1
