= Ahmed Al-Minhali =

Qatari footballer (born 1999)

Personal information
- Full name: Ahmed Al Bakheet Al Minhali
- Date of birth: 5 May 1999 (age 27)
- Place of birth: Qatar
- Height: 1.68 m (5 ft 6 in)
- Position: Left back

Team information
- Current team: Al-Rayyan
- Number: 12

Senior career*
Years	Team	Apps	(Gls)
2018–2019	Al-Sailiya	14	(0)
2019–2021	Al-Duhail	0	(0)
2019–2021	→ Al-Sailiya (loan)	34	(0)
2021–2023	Al-Sailiya	37	(0)
2023–	Al-Rayyan	0	(0)

International career^{‡}
2016–2018	Qatar U19	6	(0)
2019	Qatar U20	3	(0)
2018	Qatar U21	4	(0)
- * Club domestic league appearances and goals as of 29 May 2023 ‡ National team caps and goals as of 14 March 2023

Ahmed Al-Minhali (born 5 May 1999) is a Qatari footballer who plays as a left back for Qatari club Al-Rayyan.

== Honours ==
Al-Sailiya

- Qatar FA Cup: 2021
- Qatari Stars Cup: 2020-21, 2021-22
