= Adel Habib Beldi =

Algerian football player (born 1994)

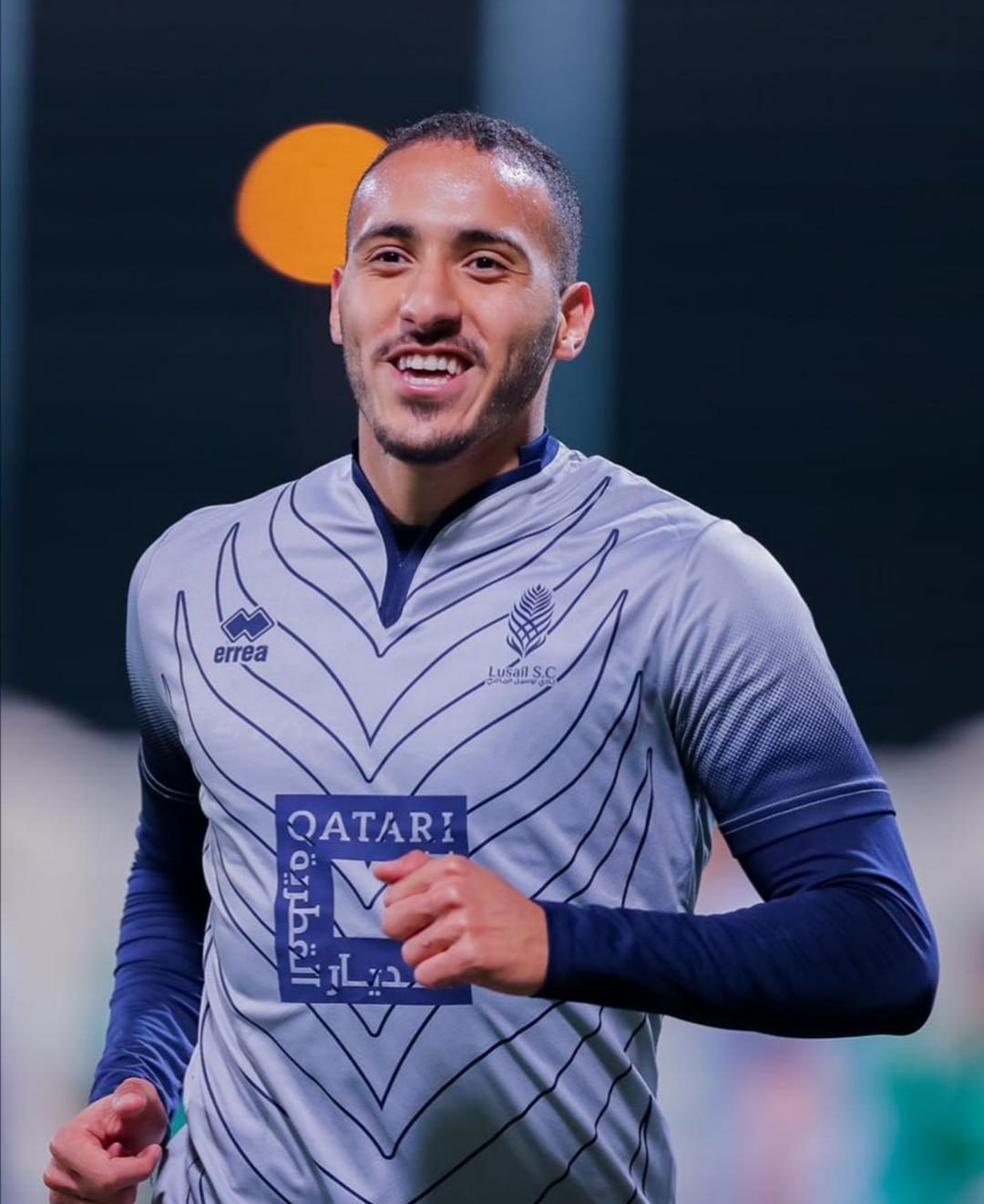
- Adel's first goal with Lusail SC

Personal information
- Full name: Adel Habib Beldi
- Date of birth: July 9, 1994 (age 32)
- Place of birth: Annaba, Algeria
- Height: 1.86 m (6 ft 1 in)
- Position: Striker

Youth career
- 2006–2010: Aspire Academy

Senior career*
Years	Team	Apps	(Gls)
2010–2013	Lekhwiya	10	(3)
2021	Lusail	6	(1)
- * Club domestic league appearances and goals as of 00:00, April 12, 2012 (UTC)

Adel Habib Beldi (Arabic: عادل حبيب بلدي, born July 9, 1994) is an Algerian football who plays as a striker. He is a striker and a former Lekhwiya SC in the Qatar Stars League.

== Club career ==
On April 15, 2011, Beldi made his professional debut for Lekhwiya (now known as Al Duhail SC) as a substitute in a league match against Al Rayyan. as being considered the youngest player in the league

== Honours ==
- Won the Qatar Stars League once with Lekhwiya in 2011
