= 2010–11 Qatar Stars League =

47th season of top-tier football league in Qatar

Qatar Stars League
- Season: 2010–11
- Champions: Lekhwiya
- Relegated: Al-Sailiya
- AFC Champions League: Lekhwiya; Al-Gharafa; Al-Rayyan; Al-Arabi
- Top goalscorer: (Iraq) Younis Mahmoud (15 goals)

The 2010–11 Qatar Stars League was the 38th edition of the top level football championship in Qatar and ran from September 2010 to April 2011.

== Teams ==
Al-Shamal were relegated to the second-level league after finishing bottom in the last season campaign. Al-Sailiya survived the drop after winning the end of season relegation/promotion playoff against Mesaimeer.

Lekhwiya were promoted as the 2nd level champions under their former name of Al-Shorta Doha or locally known as the Internal Security Forces (ISF).

=== Clubs ===
Locations of teams in the 2010-11 Qatari League

Club	City/Town	Stadium	Head coach
Al Ahli	Doha	Hamad bin Khalifa Stadium	(Qatar) Abdullah Mubarak
Al-Arabi	Doha	Grand Hamad Stadium	(Brazil) Péricles Chamusca
Al-Gharafa	Al Gharrafa	Thani bin Jassim Stadium	(France) Bruno Metsu
Al Kharaitiyat	Al Kharaitiyat	Ahmad bin Ali Stadium ^{1}	(France) Bernard Simondi
Al-Khor	Al Khor	Al-Khor SC Stadium	(France) Alain Perrin
Al-Rayyan	Al Rayyan	Ahmad bin Ali Stadium	(Brazil) Paulo Autuori
Al Sadd	Doha	Jassim bin Hamad Stadium	(Uruguay) Jorge Fossati
Al-Sailiya	Al Sailiya	Suheim bin Hamad Stadium	(Germany) Uli Stielike
Al-Wakrah	Al Wakrah	Al Janoub Stadium	(Iraq) Adnan Dirjal
Lekhwiya ^{2}	Doha	Suheim bin Hamad Stadium	(Algeria) Djamel Belmadi
Qatar SC	Doha	Suheim bin Hamad Stadium	(Brazil) Sebastião Lazaroni
Umm Salal	Umm Salal	Thani bin Jassim Stadium	(Morocco) Hassan Harmatallah

^{1} Although this is classed as Al-Kharaitiyat home ground, the stadium is not up to QSL standards, and the club uses other venues to host games
^{2} Formally known as Al Shorta

=== Foreign players ===
Club	Player 1	Player 2	Player 3	AFC player	Former players
Al Ahli	(France) Olivier Kapo	(Ghana) Agyemang Opoku	(Oman) Mohammed Rabia Al-Noobi	(Uzbekistan) Shavkat Mullajanov	(Brazil) Fabiano Eller (Brazil) Giba (Ivory Coast) Olivier Tia
Al-Arabi	(Argentina) Leonardo Pisculichi	(Brazil) Caboré	(Ivory Coast) Antonin Koutouan	(Bahrain) Salman Isa	(Brazil) Kim
Al-Gharafa	(Brazil) Juninho Pernambucano	(Ivory Coast) Amara Diané	(Morocco) Otmane El Assas	(Iraq) Younis Mahmoud	(Brazil) Clemerson
Al Kharaitiyat	(Burkina Faso) Yahia Kébé	(Mozambique) Dario Khan	(Nigeria) Onyekachi Okonkwo	(Iraq) Alaa Abdul-Zahra	
Al-Khor	(Bahrain) Sayed Mohamed Adnan	(Brazil) Alan Bahia	(Brazil) Ney Mineiro	(Iraq) Salam Shaker	(Brazil) Caio (Ghana) Abdoulaye Barry
Al-Rayyan	(Brazil) Itamar	(Brazil) Moisés Moura	(Brazil) Rodrigo Tabata	(South Korea) Cho Yong-hyung	(Brazil) Afonso Alves (Brazil) Marcelo Bordon (Ivory Coast) Amara Diané
Al Sadd	(Algeria) Nadir Belhadj	(Brazil) Leandro	(Ivory Coast) Abdul Kader Keïta	(South Korea) Lee Jung-soo	(Ghana) Agyemang Opoku
Al-Sailiya	(Algeria) Yazid Mansouri	(Bahrain) Abdulla Al-Marzooqi	(Burkina Faso) Moumouni Dagano	(Bahrain) Faouzi Aaish	
Al-Wakrah	(Brazil) Reinaldo	(Iraq) Ali Rehema	(Morocco) Anouar Diba	(Iraq) Nashat Akram	(Morocco) Adil Ramzi (Morocco) Aziz Ben Askar (Morocco) Younés Hawassi
Lekhwiya	(Ivory Coast) Aruna Dindane	(Ivory Coast) Bakari Koné	(Morocco) Abdeslam Ouaddou	(Uzbekistan) Jasur Hasanov	
Qatar SC	(Brazil) Marcinho	(Iraq) Ali Hasan Kamal	(Morocco) Youssef Safri	(Iraq) Qusay Munir	(Morocco) Talal El Karkouri
Umm Salal	(Burkina Faso) Aristide Bancé	(Morocco) Adil Ramzi	(Netherlands) Mario Melchiot	(Bahrain) Mohamed Husain	(Brazil) Davi (Nigeria) Derick Ogbu (Spain) Gabri

== League table ==
Pos	Team	Pld	W	D	L	GF	GA	GD	Pts	Qualification or relegation
1	Lekhwiya (C)	22	15	3	4	40	17	+23	48	2011 Qatar Crown Prince Cup and 2012 AFC Champions League group stage (Note: Since Al-Rayyan also won the 2011 Emir of Qatar Cup, the fourth-placed team of the league also qualified for the 2012 AFC Champions League.)
2	Al-Gharafa	22	14	1	7	51	31	+20	43	2011 Qatar Crown Prince Cup and 2012 AFC Champions League group stage
3	Al-Rayyan	22	12	6	4	39	22	+17	42	2011 Qatar Crown Prince Cup and 2012 AFC Champions League group stage
4	Al-Arabi	22	12	5	5	37	26	+11	41	2011 Qatar Crown Prince Cup and 2012 AFC Champions League group stage
5	Qatar SC	22	11	7	4	40	26	+14	40	
6	Al Sadd	22	11	3	8	32	26	+6	36	
7	Al-Wakrah	22	8	3	11	30	36	−6	27	
8	Al Kharaitiyat	22	7	4	11	27	40	−13	25	
9	Umm Salal	22	5	4	13	24	39	−15	19	
10	Al-Khor	22	4	7	11	24	33	−9	19	
11	Al-Sailiya (R)	22	3	6	13	25	47	−22	15	Promotion/relegation playoff
12	Al Ahli	22	4	3	15	16	44	−28	15	Promotion/relegation playoff

Updated to match(es) played on 31 March 2011. Source: RSSSF
Rules for classification: 1) points; 2) goal difference; 3) number of goals scored.
(C) Champions; (R) Relegated

=== Pre-Relegation Playoff ===
After finishing the season with the same number of points, Al Ahli and Al-Sailiya faced each one in a tie played over one leg to decide which team relegates and which team faces Al-Shamal (2nd placed team of 2010-11 Qatar 2nd Division).

19 April 2011
18:30 (UTC +3)

Al-Ahli (Qatar)	1 - 0 (a.e.t.)	(Qatar) Al-Sailiya
Wagner 100'	Report

Jassim bin Hamad Stadium, Doha

=== Relegation playoff ===
5 May 2011
18:45 (UTC +3)

Al-Ahli (Qatar)	4 - 3	(Qatar) Al-Shamal
Wagner 11', 17', 32'; Opoku 37'		Renan 56'; Jomaa 66'; Budawood 83'

Ahmad bin Ali Stadium, Al-Rayyan

== Fixtures and results ==
Home \ Away	SAD	RAY	GHA	QSC	UMM	KHO	WAK	KHA	ARA	SAI	LEK	AHL
Al Sadd		1–0	1–3	1–3	0–1	1–1	4–0	3–2	0–2	3–2	0–1	2–0
Al-Rayyan	1–1		3–2	1–1	3–0	1–0	3–0	2–1	0–1	4–1	2–1	2–0
Al-Gharafa	1–0	3–3		0–2	2–0	3–0	2–4	5–1	1–3	3–1	0–1	2–0
Qatar SC	2–2	2–0	4–0		2–1	3–1	1–0	0–0	1–1	2–2	0–1	0–0
Umm Salal	0–3	0–2	2–3	4–2		1–1	2–1	2–3	1–2	1–1	1–1	1–2
Al-Khor	3–1	0–0	3–0	3–5	1–0		1–2	1–2	0–1	0–0	0–2	0–2
Al-Wakrah	0–1	2–2	0–3	0–2	2–1	0–0		3–0	0–3	0–0	1–3	2–0
Al Kharaitiyat	1–3	2–2	1–4	2–3	1–0	0–3	1–0		1–3	1–1	1–2	1–1
Al-Arabi	2–1	0–4	1–2	1–2	2–2	1–1	1–3	2–0		1–0	1–1	4–0
Al-Sailiya	0–1	1–2	0–3	2–2	2–3	3–2	2–5	0–2	5–2		0–2	2–1
Lekhwiya	1–2	3–1	0–2	1–0	3–0	3–1	4–1	0–2	1–1	4–0		3–0
Al Ahli	0–1	0–1	1–7	3–1	0–1	2–2	0–4	0–2	0–4	3–0	1–2	

Legend: Blue = home team win; Yellow = draw; Red = away team win.

== Top scorers ==
Rank	Scorer	Club	Goals
1	(Iraq) Younis Mahmoud	Al-Gharafa	15
2	(Burkina Faso) Moumouni Dagano	Al-Sailiya	14
2	(Ivory Coast) Bakari Koné	Lekhwiya	14
4	(Qatar) Sebastián Soria	Qatar SC	12
5	(Burkina Faso) Yahia Kébé	Al Kharaitiyat	11
5	(Qatar) Mohammed Razak	Lekhwiya	11
7	(Morocco) Anouar Diba	Al-Wakrah	9
7	(Qatar) Jaralla Al-Marri	Al-Rayyan	9
9	(Argentina) Leonardo Pisculichi	Al-Arabi	8
9	(Brazil) Juninho Pernambucano	Al-Gharafa	8
9	(Qatar) Ali Afif	Al Sadd	8
12	(Brazil) Caboré	Al-Arabi	7
