= 2021–22 Qatari Stars Cup =

Tournament details
- Country: Qatar
- Dates: 5 September 2021 – 28 March 2022
- Teams: 10

Final positions
- Champions: Al-Sailiya SC (2nd title)
- Runners-up: Al-Wakrah SC

Tournament statistics
- Matches played: 43
- Goals scored: 168 (3.91 per match)

The 2021 Qatari Stars Cup was the eleventh edition of Qatari Stars Cup.

The tournament featured 10 teams divided into 2 groups.

== Round One Groups ==
| Group A | Group B |
|---|---|
| Al-Wakrah SC; Al-Rayyan SC; Al-Shamal SC; Umm Salal SC; Al Ahli SC | Al-Sailiya SC; Al-Gharafa SC; Qatar SC; Al-Arabi SC; Al-Khor SC |

=== Standings ===
==== Group A ====
| Pos | Team | Pld | W | D | L | GF | GA | GD | Pts |
|---|---|---|---|---|---|---|---|---|---|
| 1 | Al-Wakrah SC | 8 | 6 | 0 | 2 | 25 | 11 | +14 | 18 |
| 2 | Al-Rayyan SC | 8 | 4 | 0 | 4 | 13 | 13 | 0 | 12 |
| 3 | Al-Shamal SC | 8 | 3 | 2 | 3 | 12 | 13 | −1 | 11 |
| 4 | Umm Salal SC | 8 | 2 | 2 | 4 | 10 | 17 | −7 | 8 |
| 5 | Al Ahli SC | 8 | 1 | 4 | 3 | 12 | 18 | −6 | 7 |

Source: soccerway.com
Rules for classification: 1) points; 2) goal difference; 3) number of goals scored.

===== Results =====
| Date | Team 1 | Score | Team 2 |
|---|---|---|---|
| 2021/09/06 | Al-Wakrah SC | 5–0 | Umm Salal SC |
| 2021/09/06 | Al-Ahli SC | 2–2 | Al-Shamal SC |
| 2021/10/05 | Al-Shamal SC | 2–1 | Al-Wakrah SC |
| 2021/10/06 | Al-Rayyan SC | 0–2 | Al-Ahli SC |
| 2021/10/10 | Umm Salal SC | 1–0 | Al-Shamal SC |
| 2021/10/10 | Al-Wakrah SC | 4–3 | Al-Rayyan SC |
| 2021/11/09 | Al-Rayyan SC | 1–2 | Umm Salal SC |
| 2021/11/09 | Al-Ahli SC | 0–2 | Al-Wakrah SC |
| 2021/11/16 | Umm Salal SC | 1–1 | Al-Ahli SC |
| 2021/11/16 | Al-Shamal SC | 0–3 | Al-Rayyan SC |
| 2021/11/22 | Umm Salal SC | 1–3 | Al-Wakrah SC |
| 2021/11/22 | Al-Shamal SC | 2–2 | Al-Ahli SC |
| 2021/11/27 | Al-Wakrah SC | 2–0 | Al-Shamal SC |
| 2021/11/27 | Al-Ahli SC | 0–2 | Al-Rayyan SC |
| 2021/12/05 | Al-Rayyan SC | 2–1 | Al-Wakrah SC |
| 2021/12/05 | Al-Shamal SC | 3–2 | Umm Salal SC |
| 2021/12/09 | Umm Salal SC | 1–2 | Al-Rayyan SC |
| 2021/12/09 | Al-Wakrah SC | 7–3 | Al-Ahli SC |
| 2021/12/14 | Al-Ahli SC | 2–2 | Umm Salal SC |
| 2021/12/14 | Al-Rayyan SC | 0–3 | Al-Shamal SC |

==== Group B ====
| Pos | Team | Pld | W | D | L | GF | GA | GD | Pts |
|---|---|---|---|---|---|---|---|---|---|
| 1 | Al-Sailiya SC | 8 | 4 | 3 | 1 | 23 | 9 | +14 | 15 |
| 2 | Al-Gharafa SC | 8 | 3 | 2 | 3 | 15 | 18 | −3 | 11 |
| 3 | Qatar SC | 8 | 3 | 1 | 4 | 11 | 21 | −10 | 10 |
| 4 | Al-Arabi SC | 8 | 2 | 3 | 3 | 14 | 14 | 0 | 9 |
| 5 | Al-Khor SC | 8 | 2 | 3 | 3 | 11 | 12 | −1 | 9 |

Source: soccerway.com
Rules for classification: 1) points; 2) goal difference; 3) number of goals scored.

===== Results =====
| Date | Team 1 | Score | Team 2 |
|---|---|---|---|
| 2021/09/05 | Al-Arabi SC | 2–2 | Al-Sailiya SC |
| 2021/09/05 | Qatar SC | 2–1 | Al-Khor SC |
| 2021/10/05 | Al-Khor SC | 0–0 | Al-Arabi SC |
| 2021/10/06 | Al-Gharafa SC | 1–1 | Qatar SC |
| 2021/10/11 | Al-Sailiya SC | 2–2 | Al-Khor SC |
| 2021/10/11 | Al-Arabi SC | 3–3 | Al-Gharafa SC |
| 2021/11/08 | Al-Gharafa SC | 3–1 | Al-Sailiya SC |
| 2021/11/08 | Qatar SC | 1–4 | Al-Arabi SC |
| 2021/11/15 | Al-Sailiya SC | 8–0 | Qatar SC |
| 2021/11/15 | Al-Khor SC | 4–2 | Al-Gharafa SC |
| 2021/11/21 | Al-Sailiya SC | 3–1 | Al-Arabi SC |
| 2021/11/21 | Al-Khor SC | 2–0 | Qatar SC |
| 2021/11/26 | Al-Arabi SC | 1–0 | Al-Khor SC |
| 2021/11/26 | Qatar SC | 4–0 | Al-Gharafa SC |
| 2021/12/02 | Al-Gharafa | 2–1 | Al-Arabi SC |
| 2021/12/02 | Al-Khor SC | 1–1 | Al-Sailiya SC |
| 2021/12/08 | Al-Sailiya SC | 3–0 | Al-Gharafa SC |
| 2021/12/08 | Al-Arabi SC | 2–3 | Qatar SC |
| 2021/12/13 | Qatar SC | 0–3 | Al-Sailiya SC |
| 2021/12/13 | Al-Gharafa SC | 4–1 | Al-Khor SC |

== Knockout round ==
=== Semi-finals ===
23 March 2022
14:05 AST (UTC+3)

| Al-Wakrah SC | 5–3 | Al-Gharafa SC |
|---|---|---|
| Omid Ebrahimi 13', 58'; Ismail Mardanli 75'; Gelson Dala 88', 90' | Report | Moayed Hassan 22', 51'; Sofiane Hanni 35' |

Jassim bin Hamad Stadium, Al Sadd SC
23 March 2022
17:00 AST (UTC+3)

| Al-Sailiya SC | 3–2 | Al-Rayyan SC |
|---|---|---|
| Walter Bwalya 15'; Driss Fettouhi 51', 81' | Report | Mouafak Awad 44'; Steven Nzonzi 65' |

Jassim bin Hamad Stadium, Al Sadd SC

== Final ==
28 March 2022
15:30 AST (UTC+3)

| Al-Wakrah SC | 4–5 | Al-Sailiya SC |
|---|---|---|
| Ismail Mardanli 4'; Nasser Al Yazidi 45+2'; Gelson Dala 56'; Omid Ebrahimi 75' | Report | Ahmed Al-Minhali 30'; Mohammed Muddather 35'; Walter Bwalya 51'; Carlos Strandberg 60'; Driss Fettouhi 98' |

Jassim bin Hamad Stadium, Al Sadd SC
