= Wagner Ribeiro (footballer) =

Brazilian footballer (born 1987)

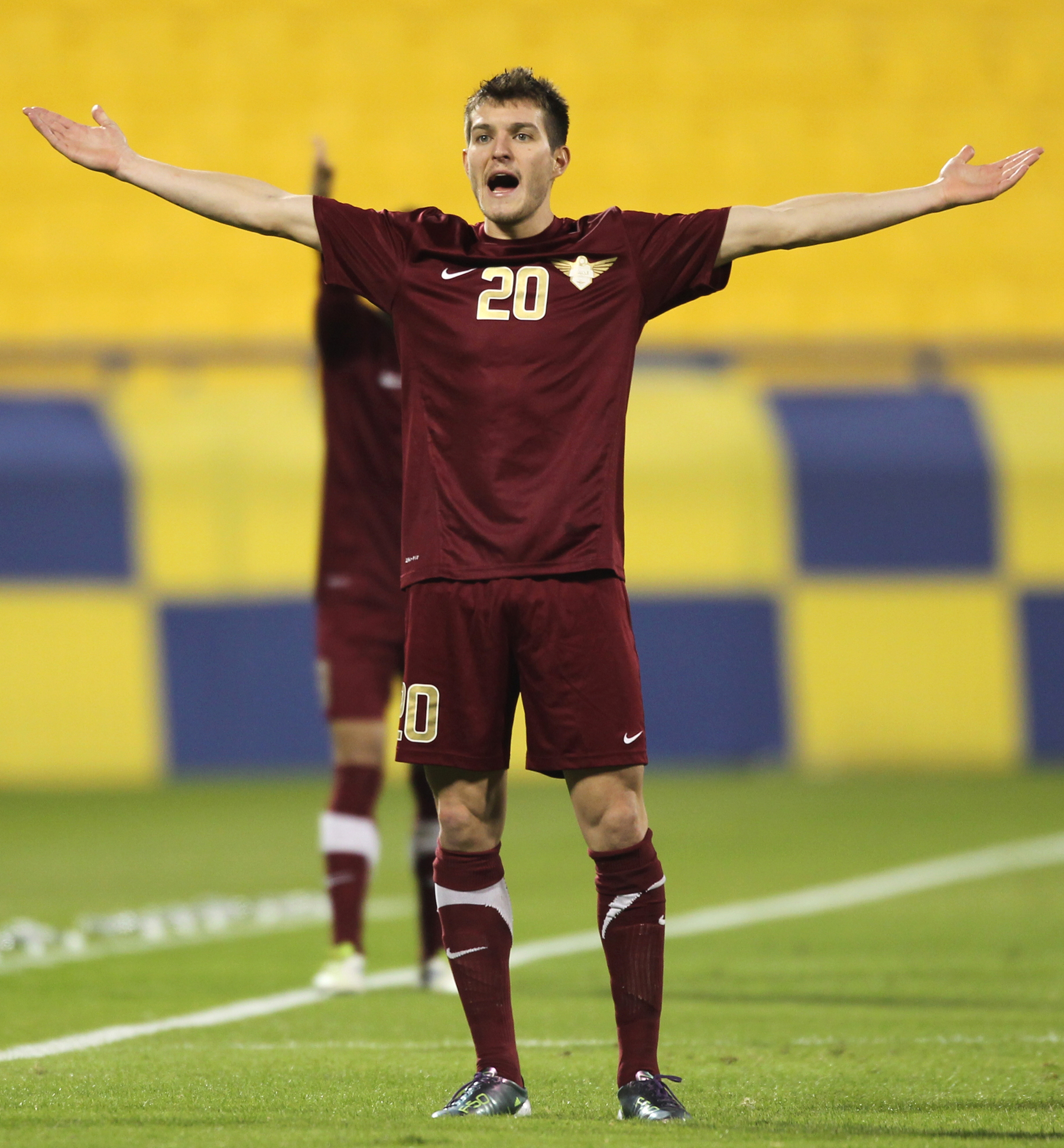

Personal information
- Full name: Wagner Renan Ribeiro
- Date of birth: 14 November 1987 (age 38)
- Place of birth: Vukovar, SR Croatia, SFR Yugoslavia
- Height: 1.80 m (5 ft 11 in)
- Position: Midfielder

Youth career
- 2004–2005: Ituano
- 2006–2007: 1. FC Kaiserslautern

Senior career*
Years	Team	Apps	(Gls)
2006–2008	Panionios	16	(0)
2009–2011	Al Ahli	33	(13)
2011–2017	El Jaish	64	(24)
2016	→ Al Arabi (loan)	14	(2)
2017	→ Al-Sailiya (loan)	7	(1)
2017–2018	Al-Sailiya	19	(12)
- * Club domestic league appearances and goals

Wagner Renan Ribeiro (born 14 November 1987, in Vukovar) is a Croatian retired footballer.

== Career ==
The midfielder played professional for Panionios in the Super League Greece.

In the 2010–11 season of the Qatar Stars League, Wagner saved his team, Al Ahli from getting relegated, first by scoring the only goal against Al-Sailiya in the pre-relegation playoff, and then by scoring a hat trick against Al Shamal in the relegation playoff.
