= Mohammed Muddather =

Sudanese footballer (born 1988)

Personal information
- Full name: Mohammed Muddather Rajab
- Date of birth: April 13, 1988 (age 38)
- Place of birth: Sudan
- Position: Forward

Senior career*
Years	Team	Apps	(Gls)
????–2007	Al-Ahly Shendi		
2007–2011	Al-Wakrah	8	(1)
2011–2013	Lekhwiya SC	6	(0)
2013–2016	Al Arabi	7	(0)
2016–2023	Al-Sailiya	123	(18)
2023–2024	Al-Kharaitiyat	11	(2)
- * Club domestic league appearances and goals as of 27 March 2024

Mohmad Mdether Driss Rajeb (born 13 April 1988) is a Sudanese footballer who plays as a forward.

== Club career ==
Rajeb started his career with Al-Ahly Shendi in Sudan and joined in the spring of 2007 to Qatar Stars League club Al-Wakrah. In December 2011 left Al-Wakrah and joined to Qatar Stars League rival Lekhwiya SC. From 2013 to 2016 he played for Al-Arabi SC. In August 2016, he joined Al-Sailiya SC.

== Honours ==
=== Club ===
Al-Duhail

- Qatari Stars League: 2011-12
- Qatar Cup: 2013

Al-Sailiya

- Qatari Stars Cup: 2020-21, 2021-22
