= Mousa Al Allaq =

Qatari footballer (born 1986)

Personal information
- Full name: Mousa Majid Al Allaq
- Date of birth: June 30, 1986 (age 40)
- Place of birth: Qatar
- Height: 1.76 m (5 ft 9 in)
- Position: Forward

Senior career*
Years	Team	Apps	(Gls)
2005–2010	Qatar SC	27	(3)
2006	→ Al-Gharafa (loan)		
2010–2012	Lekhwiya	30	(0)
2012–2016	Qatar SC	85	(15)
2016–2017	Al-Kharaitiyat	13	(0)
2017–2019	Mesaimeer		
2018–2020	Al-Shamal		
2020–2021	Al Bidda		

International career
2005–	Qatar	2	(0)
- * Club domestic league appearances and goals

Mousa Majid Al Allaq (born June 30, 1986) is a Qatari footballer.

== International career ==
The defender has regularly represented Qatar in the under-23 national football team. In 2011, after winning the Qatar Stars League championship with his club Lekhwiya, Mousa was called up in the senior national football team for the 2014 FIFA World Cup qualification (AFC) against Vietnam.
