= Yahia Kébé =

Burkinabé footballer (born 1985)

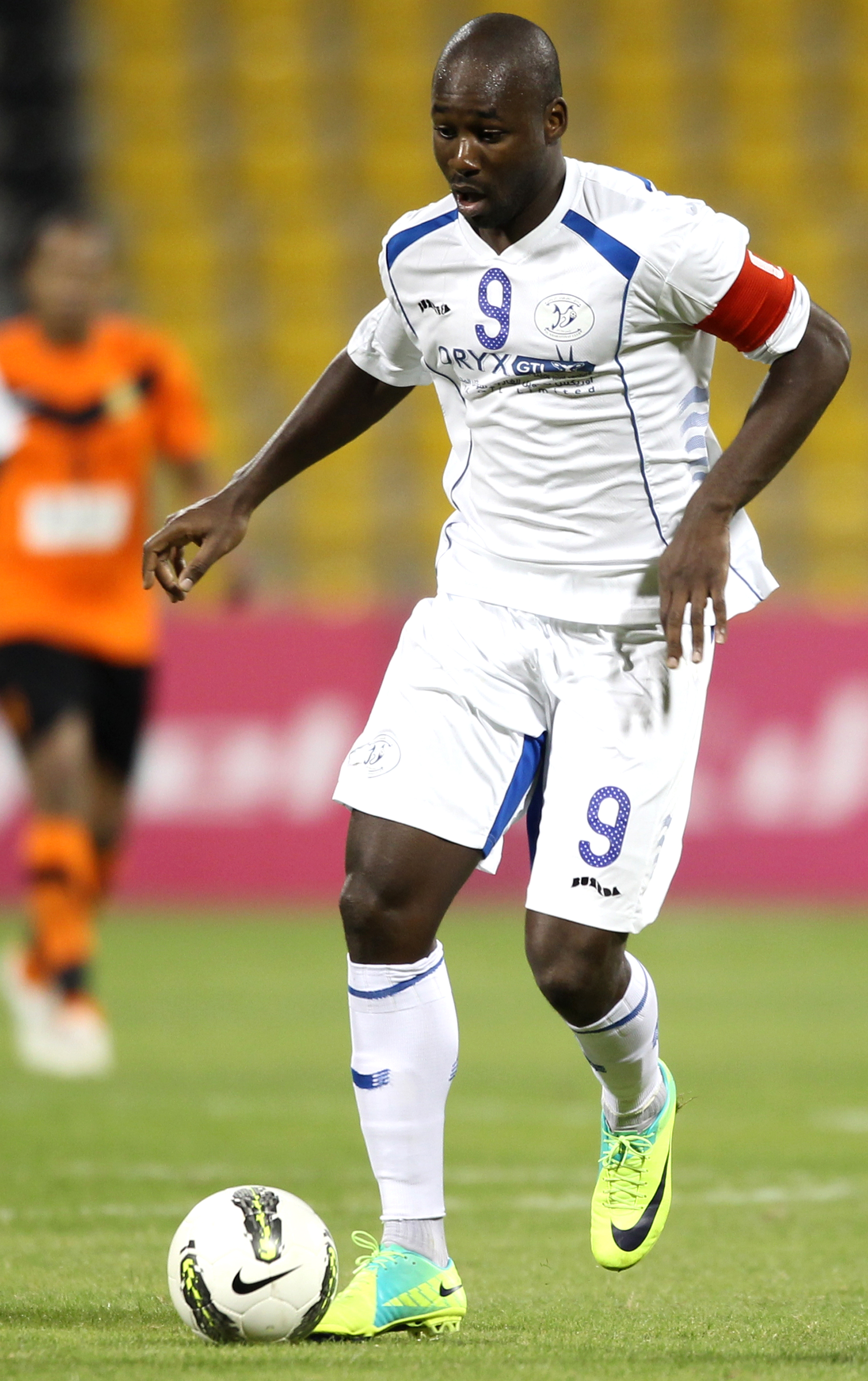
- Yahia Kébé with Al-Kharitiyath

Personal information
- Date of birth: 11 July 1985 (age 41)
- Place of birth: Ouagadougou, Burkina Faso
- Height: 1.82 m (6 ft 0 in)
- Position: Striker

Team information
- Current team: Al-Zawraa

Youth career
- 1999–2002: US Torcy
- 2002–2003: Blackburn Rovers
- 2003–2004: Bordeaux

Senior career*
Years	Team	Apps	(Gls)
2004–2005	Bordeaux B	34	(9)
2005–2007	FC Libourne Saint-Seurin	59	(18)
2007–2009	Troyes	63	(14)
2009–2014	Al-Kharitiyath	101	(39)
2014–2015	Raja Club Athletic	8	(3)
2015–2016	Al-Kharitiyath	31	(21)
2017–	Al-Zawraa		

International career^{‡}
2005–	Burkina Faso	13	(3)
- * Club domestic league appearances and goals as of 12 January 2025 {UTC} ‡ National team caps and goals as of 11:35, 11 February 2021 (UTC)

Yahia Kébé (born 11 July 1985) is a Burkinabé professional footballer who plays as a striker for Al-Zawraa.

== Club career ==
Kébé began his career in 1999 with US Torcy. He played with the club's youth squad before transferring to Blackburn Rovers in 2003. In 2003 he joined Bordeaux and was promoted to the reserve team 2004 where he played with his brother Boubacar, Kébé who scores 6 goals in 20 games.

In 2005 Kébé moved to FC Libourne Saint-Seurin. In the 2005–06 season he played 21 matches and scored 8 goals and in 2006–07, he made 35 appearances in Ligue 2 scoring 10 goals.

Kébé left Libourne in July 2007 and moved to Troyes AC, where he played 23 games and scored 7 goals in his first season. In the season 2008–09 season he scored 3 goals in 18 games for Troyes in the French Ligue 2.

== International career ==
Kébé represented Burkina Faso national team internationally.

== Personal life ==
His father is Malian and his mother is Burkinabé; he is the elder brother of Boubacar Kébé and sister Asta.
