= Khalid Muftah =

Qatari footballer (born 1992)

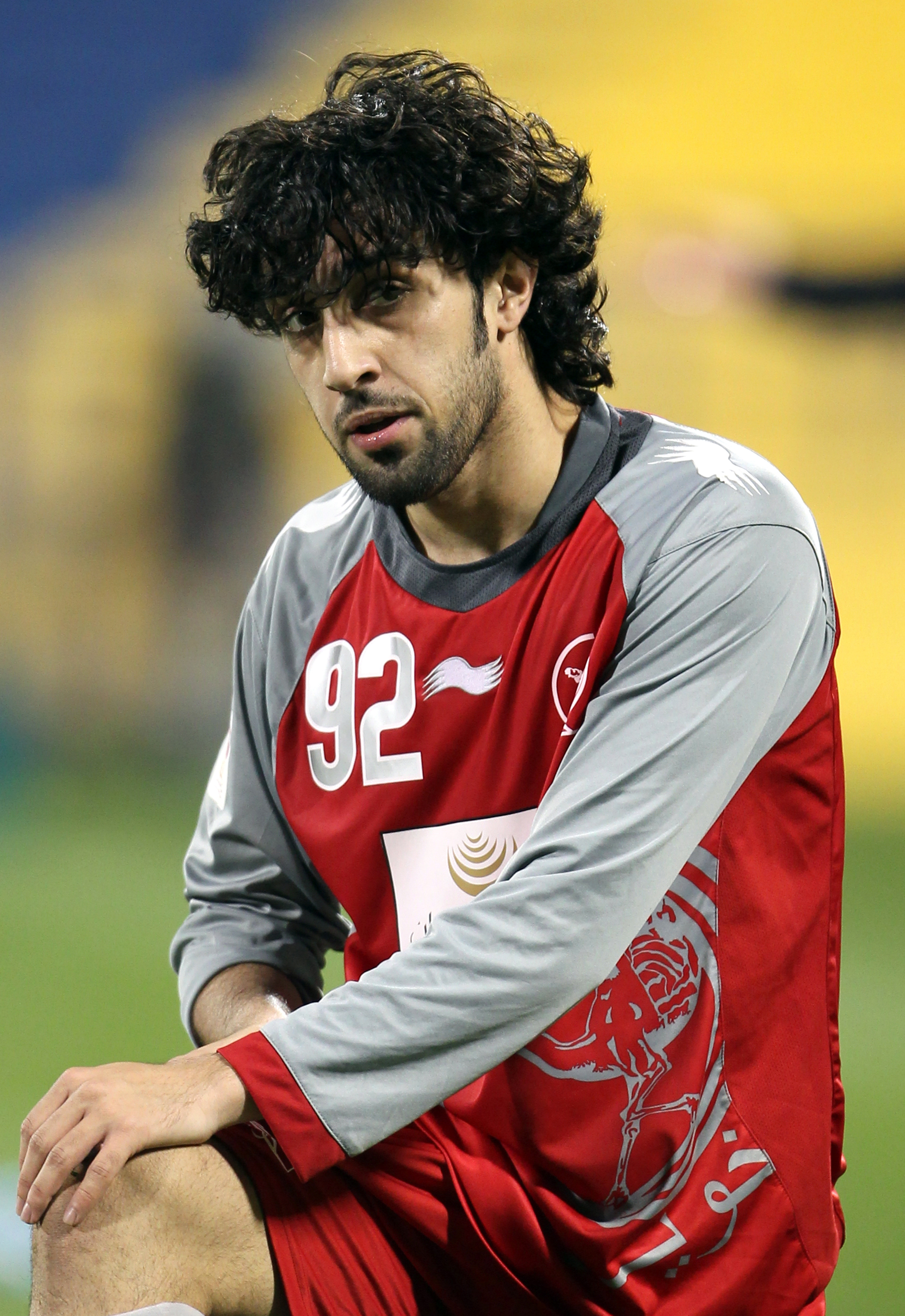

Personal information
- Full name: Khalid Muftah Mayuuf
- Date of birth: 2 July 1992 (age 34)
- Place of birth: Al Wakrah, Qatar
- Height: 1.71 m (5 ft 7 1/2 in)
- Positions: Left back; left midfielder

Team information
- Current team: Al Shahaniya
- Number: 32

Senior career*
| Years | Team | Apps | (Gls) |
| 2008–2010 | Al-Wakrah | 18 | (6) |
| 2010–2021 | Al-Duhail | 142 | (9) |
| 2019 | → Al-Wakrah (loan) | | |
| 2019–2021 | → Al-Rayyan (loan) | 30 | (0) |
| 2021–2025 | Al-Rayyan | 46 | (0) |
| 2025– | Al Shahaniya | 6 | (0) |

International career^{‡}
| 2010– | Qatar | 37 | (1) |
- * Club domestic league appearances and goals as of 17 January 2026 ‡ National team caps and goals as of 10:56, 26 February 2019 (UTC)

Khalid Muftah Mayuuf (born 2 July 1992) is a Qatari footballer. He plays primarily as a left back, but can also play as a left midfielder for Al Shahaniya.

== Club career ==
Born in Al Wakrah, Muftah has played club football for Al-Wakrah and Lekhwiya. Lekhwiya was later merged with another QSL club, El Jaish, under the name of Al-Duhail.

On 9 January 2019, Al-Wakrah has signed Khalid Muftah for one seasons from Al-Duhail.

On 16 July 2019, Al-Rayyan has signed Khalid Muftah for one seasons from Al-Duhail.

On 11 September 2025, Al Shahaniya signed Muftah for one seasons.

== International career ==
He made his senior international debut for Qatar in 2010, and has appeared in FIFA World Cup qualifying matches.

=== International goals ===
Scores and results list Qatar's goal tally first.

| No | Date | Venue | Opponent | Score | Result | Competition |
|---|---|---|---|---|---|---|
| 1. | 14 July 2014 | Saoud bin Abdulrahman Stadium, Al Wakrah, Qatar | Indonesia | 1–1 | 2–2 | Friendly |
