= Ismail Mardanli =

Qatari footballer (born 1987)

Personal information
- Full name: Ismail Mahmoud Mardanli
- Date of birth: January 8, 1987 (age 39)
- Place of birth: Aleppo, Syria
- Height: 1.79 m (5 ft 10 1/2 in)
- Position: Forward

Team information
- Current team: Al Bidda
- Number: 70

Youth career
- 2009–2010: Al-Ittihad

Senior career*
Years	Team	Apps	(Gls)
2010–2013	El Jaish	13	(1)
2013–2021	Umm Salal	142	(22)
2019–2020	→ Al-Wakrah (loan)	15	(2)
2021–2023	Al-Wakrah	22	(0)
2023–2024	Mesaimeer	10	(2)
2025	Al Bidda		

International career
2014–	Qatar	1	(0)
- * Club domestic league appearances and goals

Ismail Mahmoud Mardanli (Arabic: اسماعيل محمود ماردنلي; born January 8, 1987) is a football player for Al Bidda as a forward. Born in Syria, he represented the Qatar national team.

== Club career ==
=== Early career ===
Mahmoud began with the Al-Ittihad Aleppo youth squad before he moved with his family to Qatar.

=== El-Jaish ===
Mardanli helped the team with the promotion by scoring many goals in the 2010-2011 season, despite that he never became a regular after the promotion. On October 30, 2011, he scored his first goal in the Qatar Stars League in the 2–1 win against Al Sadd.

=== Umm Salal ===
On January 17, 2013, he joined Umm Salal on loan until the end of the season.
