= Rami Fayez =

Qatari footballer (born 1986)

Personal information
- Full name: Rami Fayez Abo Shamalah
- Date of birth: 23 September 1986 (age 40)
- Place of birth: Jordan
- Height: 1.79 m (5 ft 10 1/2 in)
- Position: Left back

Senior career*
Years	Team	Apps	(Gls)
2009–2011	Al-Rayyan		
2011–2012	Lekhwiya	2	(0)
2012	→ Umm Salal (loan)	13	(0)
2012–2013	Qatar SC	10	(0)
2013–2017	El Jaish	21	(0)
2014–2016	→ Umm Salal (loan)	29	(1)
2016–2017	→ Al Arabi (loan)	13	(0)
2017	→ Al-Sailiya (loan)	7	(0)
2017–2018	Umm Salal	22	(0)
2018–2019	Qatar SC	18	(0)
2019–2021	Umm Salal	19	(0)
2021	→ Al-Sailiya (loan)	11	(0)
2021–2023	Al-Sailiya	34	(0)

International career
2017	Qatar	1	(0)
- * Club domestic league appearances and goals

Rami Fayez (Arabic:رامي فايز) (born 23 September 1986) is a footballer plays as a left back. Born in Jordan, he represented the Qatar national team.

== Honours ==
=== Club ===
Al-Rayyan

- Emir of Qatar Cup: 2011

El-Jaish

- Qatar Cup: 2014

Al-Sailiya

- Qatari Stars Cup: 2020-21, 2021-22
- Qatar FA Cup: 2021
