= Baba Malick =

Qatari footballer (born 1983)

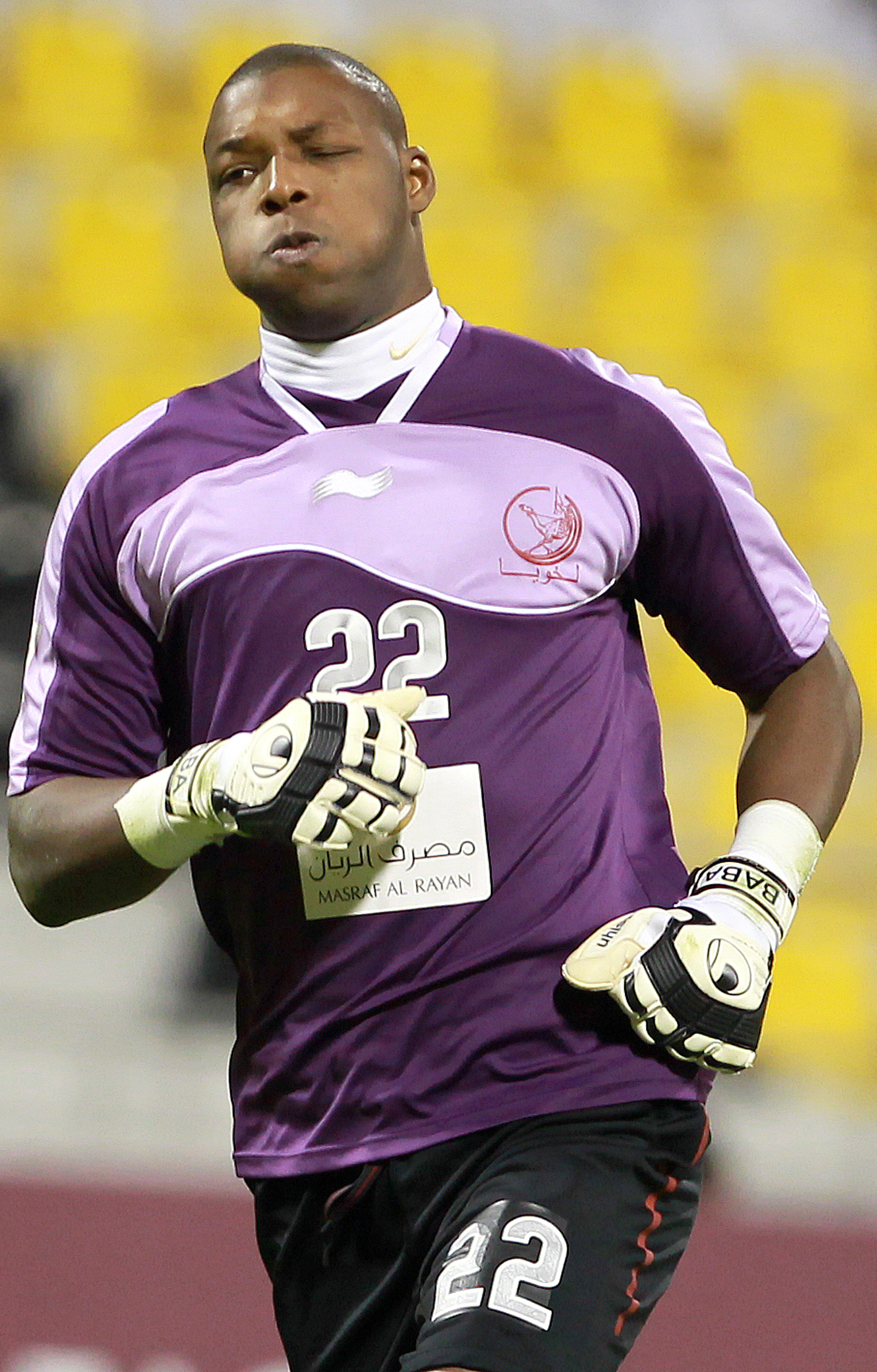

Personal information
- Full name: Baba Malick N'Diaye
- Date of birth: 3 September 1983 (age 43)
- Place of birth: Cordina, Senegal
- Height: 1.94 m (6 ft 4 1/2 in)
- Position: Goalkeeper

Senior career*
| Years | Team | Apps | (Gls) |
| 2002–2010 | Umm Salal | 122 | (0) |
| 2010–2013 | Lekhwiya SC | 58 | (0) |
| 2013–2021 | Umm Salal | 127 | (0) |
| 2019–2020 | → Al-Shamal (loan) | 3 | (0) |
| 2021–2022 | Al-Kharaitiyat | 0 | (0) |

International career^{‡}
| 2008–2009 | Qatar | 5 | (0) |
- * Club domestic league appearances and goals as of 29 December 2009 ‡ National team caps and goals as of 29 December 2009

Baba Malick N'Diaye (born 3 September 1983 in Cordina) is a former footballer who played as a goalkeeper. Born in Senegal, he represented Qatar at international level.

== Club career statistics ==
Statistics accurate as of 10 April 2023

| Club | Season | League | League | | Cup^{1} | | League Cup^{2} | | Continental^{3} | | Total | |
| Club | Season | League | Apps | Goals | Apps | Goals | Apps | Goals | Apps | Goals | Apps | Goals |
|---|---|---|---|---|---|---|---|---|---|---|---|---|
| Umm-Salal | 2002–03 | Qatari Second Division | | | | | | | | | | |
| Umm-Salal | 2003–04 | Qatari Second Division | | | | | | | | | | |
| Umm-Salal | 2004–05 | Qatari Second Division | | | | | | | | | | |
| Umm-Salal | 2005–06 | Qatari Second Division | | | | | | | | | | |
| Umm-Salal | 2006–07 | QSL | 23 | 0 | | | | | | | | |
| Umm-Salal | 2007–08 | QSL | 21 | 0 | | | | | | | | |
| Umm-Salal | 2008–09 | QSL | 14 | 0 | | | | | | | | |
| Umm-Salal | 2009–10 | QSL | 22 | 0 | | | | | 9 | 0 | | |
| Umm-Salal | Total | | 80 | 0 | | | | | | | | |
| Lekhwiya | 2010–11 | QSL | 19 | 0 | | | | | | | | |
| Lekhwiya | 2011–12 | QSL | 19 | 0 | | | | | 5 | 0 | | |
| Lekhwiya | 2012–13 | QSL | 19 | 0 | | | | | 1 | 0 | | |
| Lekhwiya | Total | | 57 | 0 | | | | | 6 | 0 | | |
| Umm Salal | 2013–14 | QSL | 14 | 0 | | | | | | | | |
| Umm Salal | 2014–15 | QSL | 23 | 0 | | | | | | | | |
| Umm Salal | 2015–16 | QSL | 25 | 0 | | | | | | | | |
| Umm Salal | 2016–17 | QSL | 21 | 0 | | | | | | | | |
| Umm Salal | 2017–18 | QSL | 10 | 0 | | | | | | | | |
| Umm Salal | 2018–19 | QSL | 7 | 0 | | | | | | | | |
| Umm Salal | 2019–20 | QSL | 8 | 0 | | | | | | | | |
| Umm Salal | 2020–21 | QSL | 19 | 0 | 1 | 0 | | | | | | |
| Umm Salal | Total | | 127 | 0 | | | | | | | | |
| Al-Shamal (Loan) | 2019–20 | Qatari Second Division | 3 | 0 | | | | | | | | |
| Al Kharaitiyat SC | 2021–22 | Qatari Second Division | 13 | 0 | 1 | 0 | | | 1 | 0 | | |
| Al Kharaitiyat SC | 2022–23 | Qatari Second Division | 0 | 0 | 0 | 0 | 0 | 0 | 0 | 0 | 0 | 0 |
| Al Kharaitiyat SC | Total | | 13 | 0 | | | | | | | | |
| Career total | | | 280 | 0 | | | | | 15 | 0 | | |

^{1}Includes Emir of Qatar Cup.

^{2}Includes Sheikh Jassem Cup.

^{3}Includes AFC Champions League.

== International career ==
He is also player of the Qatar national football team and was nominated among the Asian Football Confederation Players of the Year 2009.
