= Dame Traoré =

Qatari footballer (born 1986)

Personal information
- Date of birth: 19 May 1986 (age 40)
- Place of birth: Metz, France
- Height: 1.88 m (6 ft 2 in)
- Position: Defender

Team information
- Current team: Al-Gharafa
- Number: 6

Senior career*
Years	Team	Apps	(Gls)
2004–2010	Valenciennes	15	(0)
2005–2006	→ Sedan (loan)	0	(0)
2010–2018	Al-Duhail	96	(9)
2015–2016	→ Al-Arabi (loan)	11	(0)
2016–2017	→ El Jaish (loan)	9	(0)
2018–2023	Al-Rayyan	83	(2)
2023–	Al-Gharafa	42	(3)

International career^{‡}
2013	Qatar B	2	(0)
2013–	Qatar	6	(0)
- * Club domestic league appearances and goals as of 17 January 2026 ‡ National team caps and goals as of 14:17, 21 September 2022 (UTC)

Dame Traoré (born 19 May 1986) is a professional footballer who plays in Qatar for Al-Gharafa as a defender. Born in France, he represents Qatar at international level.

== Career ==
Born in Metz, Traoré has played club football in France and Qatar for Valenciennes, Sedan and Lekhwiya. The merger of Lekhwiya and the El Jaish under the name of Al-Duhail He joined Qatari club Al-Rayyan in 2018. He joined Qatari club Al-Gharafa On 17 August 2023.

== International career ==
Traoré is born in France to parents of Senegalese origin. Early in his career, Traoré moved to Qatar and became a naturalized citizen. Traoré was called up the Qatar B team on 13 November 2013. He made his official debut for the team on 25 December in the 2014 WAFF Championship in a 1–0 win against Palestine. He made his international debut for the senior national team in 2013.

== Personal life ==
He is of Senegalese origin. His brothers Mody and Mamadou are also footballers.
