= Adel Lami =

Qatari footballer (born 1985)

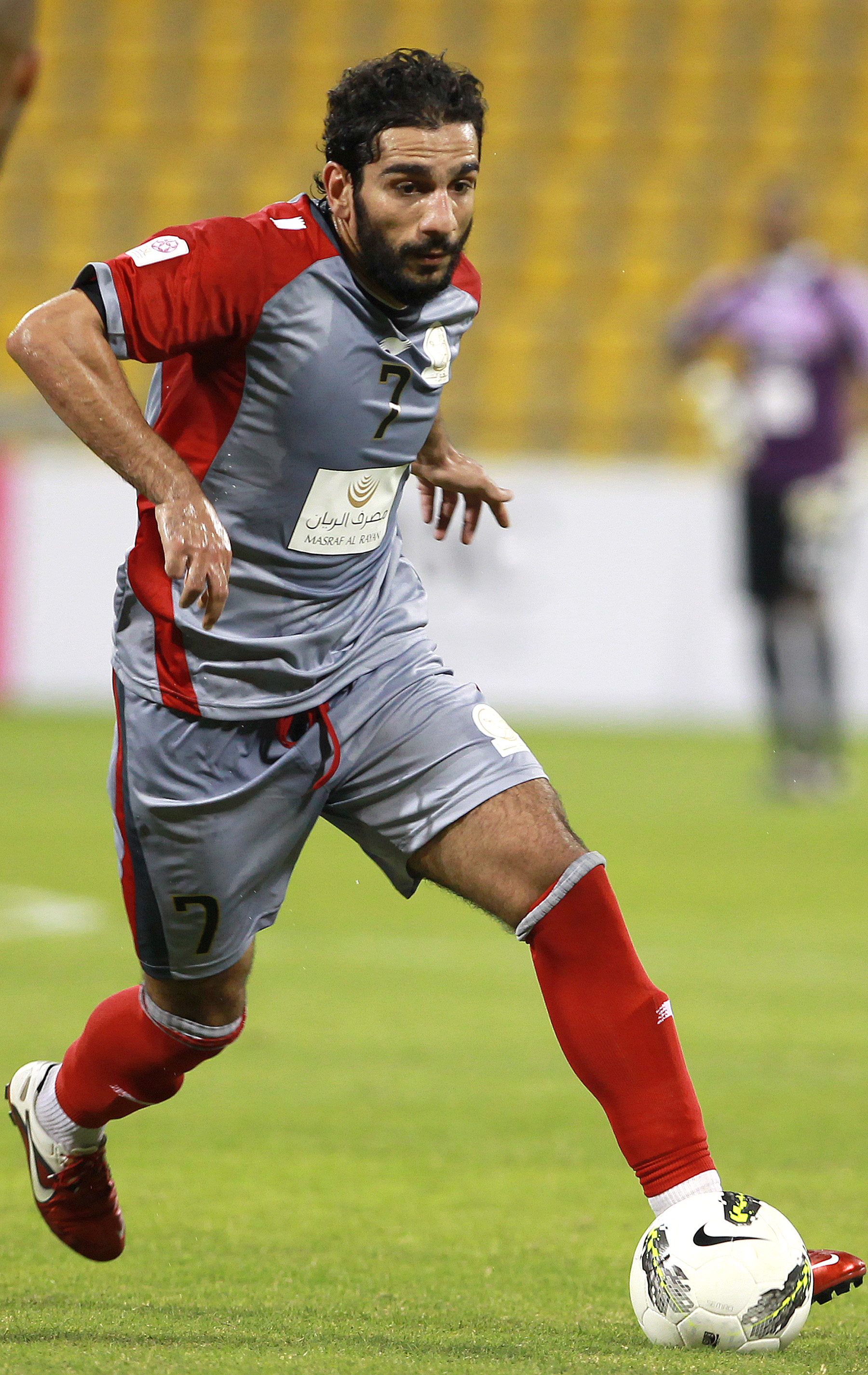
- Lami during Lekhwiya match

Personal information
- Full name: Adel Lami Khalid Mohammed
- Date of birth: November 13, 1985 (age 40)
- Place of birth: Al Magwa, Kuwait
- Height: 1.83 m (6 ft 0 in)
- Position: Midfielder

Youth career
- 1995–1999: Kuwait SC
- 1999–2001: Al-Rayyan

Senior career*
Years	Team	Apps	(Gls)
2001–2009	Al-Rayyan	84	(10)
2009–2010	Umm-Salal	9	(1)
2009–2010	Al-Rayyan	7	(0)
2010–2011	Umm-Salal	21	(1)
2011–2014	Lekhwiya	43	(7)
2014–2015	Al-Gharafa	0	(0)
2014	→ Al Kharaitiyat SC (loan)		
2015–2016	Al-Arabi		
2016–2017	Muaither		

International career^{‡}
2005–2013	Qatar	27	(5)
- * Club domestic league appearances and goals as of May 12, 2014 ‡ National team caps and goals as of May 12, 2014

Adel Lami Khalid Mohamed (born November 13, 1985) is a footballer who is a midfielder. Born in Kuwait, he represented the Qatar national team.

== Career ==
Lami was born in Al Magwa, Kuwait. He began playing football on the streets in his neighbourhood, until he joined the youth ranks of Kuwait SC. During that period, he was coached by Abdulkarim Al Aqas. When he was 14 years old, he went to Qatar to play for Al-Rayyan. He advanced through the junior teams of Al Rayyan, until he made his senior debut in 2001, coming on against Al Shamal and making an assist.

== International career ==
He is a member of the Qatar national football team.
