= Mohammed Razak =

Qatari footballer (born 1986)

Personal information
- Date of birth: 4 April 1986 (age 40)
- Place of birth: Accra, Ghana
- Height: 1.77 m (5 ft 10 in)
- Position: Striker

Senior career*
Years	Team	Apps	(Gls)
2006–2010	Muaither		
2010–2016	Lekhwiya	60	(16)
2012–2013	→ Qatar SC (loan)	22	(9)
2013–2014	→ Al Arabi (loan)	24	(4)
2015–2016	Lekhwiya b	13	(4)
2016–2017	Al-Gharafa	26	(5)
2016–2017	Al-Gharafa b	13	(7)
2017–2019	Al-Kharaitiyat	21	(2)
2019–2020	Al-Shamal	11	(4)

International career
2011–2013	Qatar	16	(3)
- * Club domestic league appearances and goals

Mohammed Razak (born 4 April 1986) is a former professional football player who played as a forward. Born in Ghana, he represented Qatar at international level.

== International career ==
Mohammed Razak scored a goal in a friendly game against Bayern Munich for the Qatar national football team on 9 July 2011.

== Career statistics ==
Statistics accurate as of 22 April 2023

Club	Season	League	League		Cup^{1}		League Cup^{2}		Continental^{3}		Total	
Club	Season	League	Apps	Goals	Apps	Goals	Apps	Goals	Apps	Goals	Apps	Goals
Lekhwiya	2010–11	QSL	18	11	2	1						
Lekhwiya	2011–12	QSL	18	2	1	0			3	0		
Lekhwiya	2014–15	QSL	13	1	1	0			4	0		
Lekhwiya	2015–16	QSL	11	2	0	0	1	1				
Lekhwiya	Total		60	16	4	1			7	0		
Lekhwiya b	2015–16	QSD	13	4	—							
Qatar SC	2012–13	QSL	22	9	2	1						
Al-Arabi	2013–14	QSL	24	4	2	0						
Al-Gharafa	2015–16	QSL	5	1	1	0						
Al-Gharafa	2016–17	QSL	21	4	2	1						
Al-Gharafa	Total		26	5	3	1						
Al-Gharafa b	2015–16	QSD	3	1	—							
Al-Gharafa b	2016–17	QSD	10	6	—							
Al-Gharafa b	Total		13	7								
Al Kharaitiyat	2017–18	QSL	7	0	1	0						
Al Kharaitiyat	2018–19	QSL	14	2	1	0						
Al Kharaitiyat	Total		21	2	2	0						
Al-Shamal	2019–20	QSD	11	4	0	0						
Career total			190	51	13	3			7	0		

^{1}Includes Emir of Qatar Cup.

^{2}Includes Sheikh Jassem Cup.

^{3}Includes AFC Champions League.
