= Amine Lecomte =

Qatari footballer (born 1990)

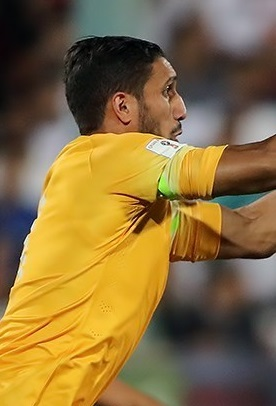

Personal information
- Full name: Amine Claude Lecomte-Addani
- Date of birth: 26 April 1990 (age 36)
- Place of birth: Reims, France
- Height: 1.94 m (6 ft 4 in)
- Position: Goalkeeper

Youth career
- 2006–2010: Sochaux

Senior career*
Years	Team	Apps	(Gls)
2010–2021	Al-Duhail	132	(0)
2017–2018	→ Al-Khor (loan)	7	(0)
2020–2021	→ Al-Sailiya (loan)	27	(0)
2021–2023	Al-Sailiya	40	(0)
2023–2026	Al-Gharafa	1	(0)
2024	→ Muaither (loan)	0	(0)

International career^{‡}
2015–2016	Qatar	18	(0)
- * Club domestic league appearances and goals as of 23 July 2012 ‡ National team caps and goals as of 1 June 2016

Amine Claude Lecomte-Addani (born 26 April 1990) is a footballer who plays as a goalkeeper. Born in France, he played for the Qatar national team.

== Career ==
Amine won the Qatar League with his club Lekhwiya in the 2010–2011 season. The team, coached by Djamel Belmadi, included Bakari Kone, Aruna Dindane, Abdeslam Ouaddou, Jasur Hasanov and Karim Boudiaf, among others.

== International career ==
Lecomte was born in France, and holds French and Moroccan nationalities. He became a naturalized Qatari citizen, and so was eligible for the Qatar, Morocco, and France national teams. In August 2011, Amine was called up by Eric Gerets in the Morocco national football team for the friendly game against Senegal. However, Amine had to call off few days before the game because of an injury. Lecomte got a callup to the Qatar national football team, and made his first appearance in a 1-0 friendly win against Algeria.
