= Moumouni Dagano =

Burkinabé footballer (born 1981)

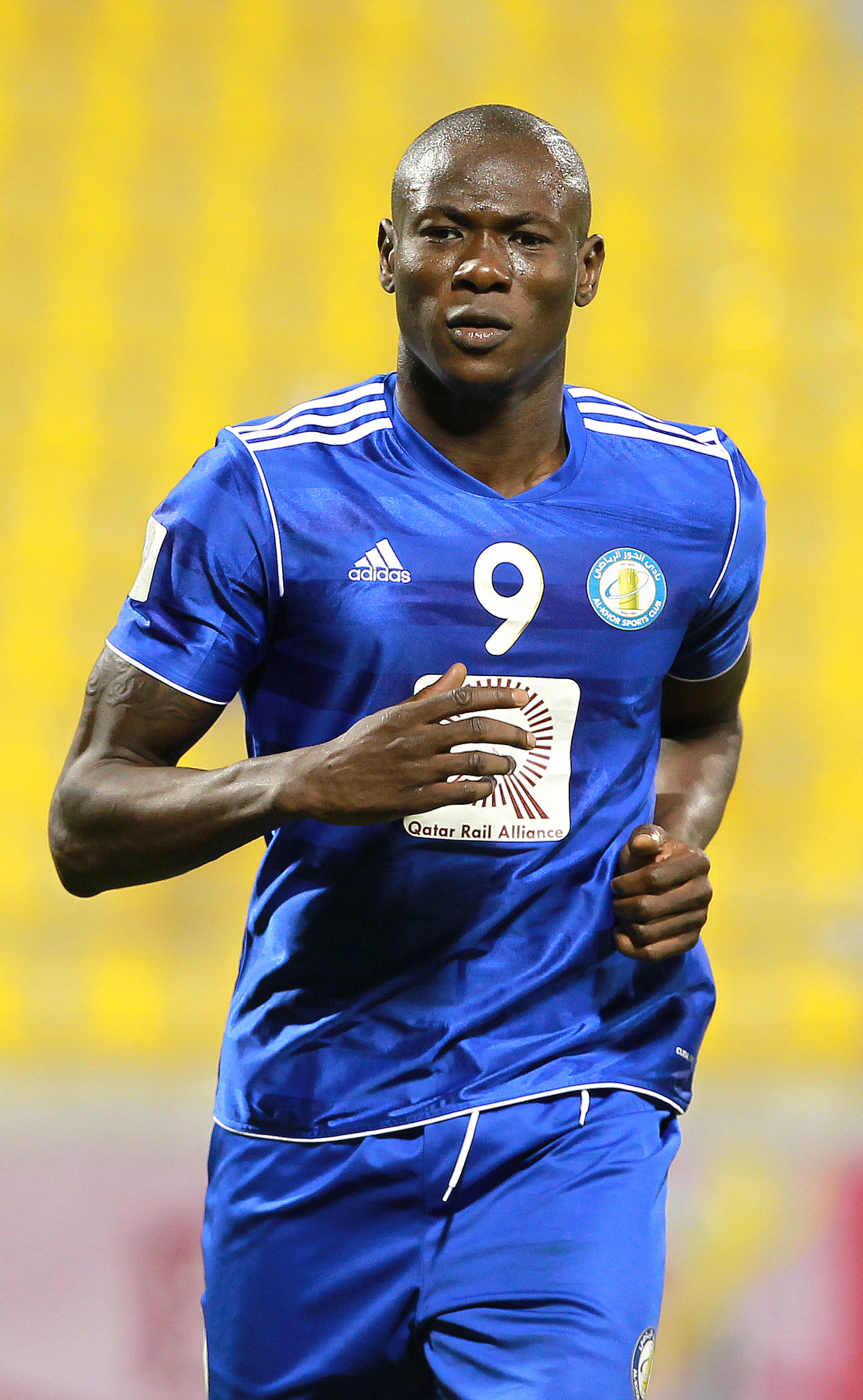
- Dagano with Al-Khor in 2011

Personal information
- Full name: Beli Moumouni Dagano
- Date of birth: 1 January 1981 (age 45)
- Place of birth: Ouagadougou, Upper Volta
- Height: 1.86 m (6 ft 1 in)
- Position: Forward

Senior career*
| Years | Team | Apps | (Gls) |
| 1998 | Stella Club d'Adjamé | 1 | (0) |
| 1998–1999 | JC Bobo Dioulasso | | |
| 1999–2000 | Etoile Filante | | |
| 2000–2001 | Germinal Beerschot | 25 | (9) |
| 2001–2003 | Genk | 61 | (35) |
| 2003–2006 | Guingamp | 69 | (21) |
| 2006–2008 | Sochaux | 66 | (9) |
| 2008–2010 | Al-Khor | 44 | (15) |
| 2010–2011 | Al-Sailiya | 22 | (14) |
| 2011–2012 | Al-Khor | 11 | (9) |
| 2012 | Lekhwiya | 12 | (4) |
| 2012–2014 | Al-Sailiya | 43 | (28) |
| 2014–2015 | Al-Shamal SC | 25 | (4) |
| 2015 | Qatar SC | 8 | (0) |
| Total | | 387 | (148) |

International career
| 1998–2014 | Burkina Faso | 83 | (34) |
Medal record
Representing Burkina Faso
Africa Cup of Nations
| Runner-up | 2013 South Africa |
- * Club domestic league appearances and goals

Beli Moumouni Dagano (born 1 January 1981) is a Burkinabé former professional footballer who played as a forward. He is the Burkina Faso national team's all-time leading goalscorer.

== Club career ==
Dagano began his career at Ivorian side Stella Club d'Adjamé, based in Abidjan. In 1999, he moved back to his homeland, with Etoile Filante, before making his move to Europe a year later, with Belgian side Germinal Beerschot. After an impressive season with Germinal, Dagano moved to Genk, where he won the Ebony Shoe and scored 19 goals as the club won the league title for only the second time in its history, before spells in France, with Guingamp and FC Sochaux. While at Sochaux he played as they won the 2007 Coupe de France Final. Dagano scored Sochaux's first goal as they drew 2–2 with Marseille, before winning on penalties. In 2008, he joined Al-Khor. He later left Al Khor for Al Sailiya two years later, but the club was subsequently relegated despite Dagano's impressive goal scoring record.

He rejoined his former club Al-Khor and made his league debut on 18 September, scoring two free-kick goals and securing the victory for his team against newly promoted club Al Jaish.

On 31 January, following Aruna Dindane's exit to Al-Gharafa, Lekhwiya immediately signed Dagano as Dindane's replacement.

On 28 May 2012, Dagano joined newly promoted Qatari club Al-Sailiya for the 2012–13 Qatari season.

== International career ==
Dagano made his debut for the Burkina Faso national team on 23 August 1998 in a friendly against Togo, scoring his first international goal in the same match, which ended in a 1–1 draw. He subsequently established himself as one of the national team's leading forwards, scoring against the Zimbabwe during the 2002 FIFA World Cup African qualifiers in 2001.

In January 2002, Dagano participated in the 2002 Africa Cup of Nations. He scored against the Morocco in the group stage, but Burkina Faso were eliminated. He also featured in all three group-stage matches at the 2004 tournament, but the team failed to advance after suffering three defeats.

Dagano also participated in the 2010 Africa Cup of Nations and the 2012 Africa Cup of Nations. At the 2010 tournament, he appeared in two group-stage matches, while at the 2012 tournament, he started all three of Burkina Faso's group-stage matches. However, Burkina Faso were eliminated in the group stage on both occasions.

In January 2013, Dagano participated in the 2013 Africa Cup of Nations. He appeared in the group-stage match against the Nigeria and also featured in the quarter-final against the Togo, helping Burkina Faso secure a 1–0 victory. Burkina Faso subsequently defeated the Ghana on penalties in the semi-finals to reach the final. However, they lost 1–0 to Nigeria in the final to finish as runners-up. Dagano also appeared as a substitute in the final.

Dagano's final international appearance came in a friendly against the Nigeria on 10 February 2013. Between 1998 and 2013, he made 83 appearances for Burkina Faso, scoring 34 goals and becoming the national team's all-time leading goalscorer.

== Career statistics ==
=== International ===
Scores and results list Burkina Faso's goal tally first, score column indicates score after each Dagano goal.

List of international goals scored by Moumouni Dagano
| No. | Date | Venue | Opponent | Score | Result | Competition |
|---|---|---|---|---|---|---|
| 1 | 23 August 1998 | Stade du 4-Août, Ouagadougou, Burkina Faso | Togo | 1–1 | 1–1 | Friendly |
| 2 | 24 February 2001 | Stade Municipal, Bobo-Dioulasso, Burkina Faso | Zimbabwe | 1–2 | 1–2 | 2002 FIFA World Cup qualification |
| 3 | 11 January 2002 | Cairo International Stadium, Cairo, Egypt | Egypt | 2–2 | 2–2 | Friendly |
| 4 | 15 January 2002 | Stade du 4-Août, Ouagadougou, Burkina Faso | Zambia | 1–1 | 2–1 | Friendly |
| 5 | 26 January 2002 | Stade Amare Daou, Ségou, Mali | Morocco | 1–1 | 1–2 | 2002 African Cup of Nations |
| 6 | 29 May 2003 | Stade François Blin, Avion, France | Algeria | 1–0 | 1–0 | Friendly |
| 7 | 7 June 2003 | Stade du 4-Août, Ouagadougou, Burkina Faso | Mozambique | 1–0 | 4–0 | 2004 African Cup of Nations qualification |
| 8 | 7 June 2003 | Stade du 4-Août, Ouagadougou, Burkina Faso | Mozambique | 2–0 | 4–0 | 2004 African Cup of Nations qualification |
| 9 | 6 July 2003 | Barthelemy Boganda Stadium, Bangui, Central African Republic | Central African Republic | 1–0 | 3–0 | 2004 African Cup of Nations qualification |
| 10 | 6 July 2003 | Barthelemy Boganda Stadium, Bangui, Central African Republic | Central African Republic | 2–0 | 3–0 | 2004 African Cup of Nations qualification |
| 11 | 17 January 2004 | Port Said Stadium, Port Said, Egypt | Egypt | 1–0 | 1–1 | Friendly |
| 12 | 12 June 2004 | Stade du 4-Août, Ouagadougou, Burkina Faso | Benin | 3–2 | 4–2 | Friendly |
| 13 | 12 June 2004 | Stade du 4-Août, Ouagadougou, Burkina Faso | Benin | 4–2 | 4–2 | Friendly |
| 14 | 20 June 2004 | Stade des Martyrs, Kinshasa, DR Congo | DR Congo | 2–2 | 2–3 | 2006 FIFA World Cup qualification |
| 15 | 4 September 2004 | Stade du 4-Août, Ouagadougou, Burkina Faso | Uganda | 1–0 | 2–0 | 2006 FIFA World Cup qualification |
| 16 | 26 March 2005 | Stade du 4-Août, Ouagadougou, Burkina Faso | Cape Verde | 1–1 | 1–2 | 2006 FIFA World Cup qualification |
| 17 | 5 June 2005 | Baba Yara Stadium, Kumasi, Ghana | Ghana | 1–0 | 1–2 | 2006 FIFA World Cup qualification |
| 18 | 18 June 2005 | Stade du 4-Août, Ouagadougou, Burkina Faso | DR Congo | 2–0 | 2–0 | 2006 FIFA World Cup qualification |
| 19 | 7 June 2008 | Stade du 4-Août, Ouagadougou, Burkina Faso | Burundi | 1–0 | 2–0 | 2010 FIFA World Cup qualification |
| 20 | 7 June 2008 | Stade du 4-Août, Ouagadougou, Burkina Faso | Burundi | 2–0 | 2–0 | 2010 FIFA World Cup qualification |
| 21 | 14 June 2008 | Stade Linité, Victoria, Seychelles | Seychelles | 1–0 | 3–2 | 2010 FIFA World Cup qualification |
| 22 | 14 June 2008 | Stade Linité, Victoria, Seychelles | Seychelles | 2–2 | 3–2 | 2010 FIFA World Cup qualification |
| 23 | 14 June 2008 | Stade Linité, Victoria, Seychelles | Seychelles | 3–2 | 3–2 | 2010 FIFA World Cup qualification |
| 24 | 12 October 2008 | Prince Louis Rwagasore Stadium, Bujumbura, Burundi | Burundi | 2–1 | 3–1 | 2010 FIFA World Cup qualification |
| 25 | 12 October 2008 | Prince Louis Rwagasore Stadium, Bujumbura, Burundi | Burundi | 3–1 | 3–1 | 2010 FIFA World Cup qualification |
| 26 | 28 March 2009 | Stade du 4-Août, Ouagadougou, Burkina Faso | Guinea | 3–0 | 4–2 | 2010 FIFA World Cup qualification |
| 27 | 28 March 2009 | Stade du 4-Août, Ouagadougou, Burkina Faso | Guinea | 4–1 | 4–2 | 2010 FIFA World Cup qualification |
| 28 | 6 June 2009 | Kamuzu Stadium, Blantyre, Malawi | Malawi | 1–0 | 1–0 | 2010 FIFA World Cup qualification |
| 29 | 11 October 2009 | Ohene Djan Stadium, Accra, Ghana | Guinea | 1–0 | 2–1 | 2010 FIFA World Cup qualification |
| 30 | 14 November 2009 | Stade du 4-Août, Ouagadougou, Burkina Faso | Malawi | 1–0 | 1–0 | 2010 FIFA World Cup qualification |
| 31 | 11 August 2010 | Stade Municipal Senlis, Senlis, France | Congo | 1–0 | 3–0 | Friendly |
| 32 | 9 October 2010 | Stade du 4-Août, Ouagadougou, Burkina Faso | Gambia | 1–0 | 3–1 | 2012 Africa Cup of Nations qualification |
| 33 | 8 October 2011 | Independence Stadium, Bakau, Gambia | Gambia | 1–1 | 1–1 | 2012 Africa Cup of Nations qualification |
| 34 | 14 October 2012 | Stade du 4-Août, Ouagadougou, Burkina Faso | Central African Republic | 2–1 | 3–1 | 2013 Africa Cup of Nations qualification |

== Honours ==
Genk

- Belgian First Division: 2001–02

Sochaux

- Coupe de France: 2006–07
