= Hussain Shehab =

Qatari footballer (born 1985)

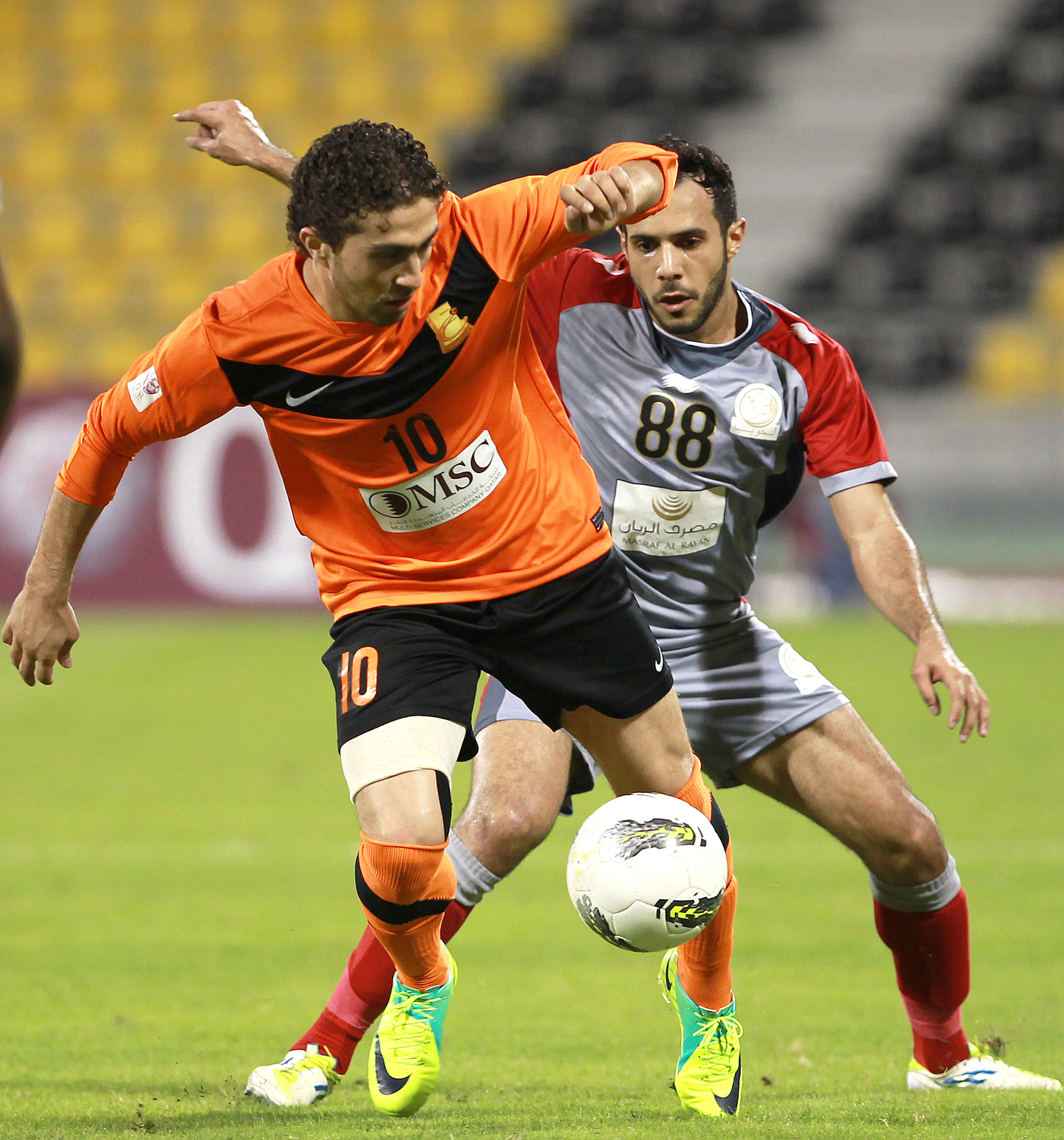
- Hussain Ali Shehab (right, 2011)

Personal information
- Full name: Hussain Ali Shehab
- Date of birth: January 1, 1985 (age 41)
- Place of birth: Basra, Iraq
- Height: 1.78 m (5 ft 10 in)
- Position: Midfielder

Youth career
- Al Ahli

Senior career*
Years	Team	Apps	(Gls)
2006–2009	Al Ahli	8	(0)
2009–2015	Lekhwiya	36	(1)
2014	→Umm Salal SC (Loan)		
2015–2017	Al-Gharafa SC		
2017	→ Muaither SC (loan)		

International career^{‡}
2011–	Qatar	19	(1)
- * Club domestic league appearances and goals ‡ National team caps and goals as of 27 March 2016

Hussain Ali Shehab (born January 1, 1985) is a footballer who plays as a midfielder. Born in Iraq, he represented the Qatar national team.

== Career ==
Shehab started playing for the youth team of Al Ahli. Two years later, he got a chance to play for the senior team, which was then in the Qatari 2nd Division. He scored 8 goals in his first season with Al Ahli, however, he suffered an injury set-back for his second season. He then moved to Lekhwiya in 2009, who were also in the 2nd division, helping them achieve promotion to the Qatar Stars League. He helped Lekhwiya win the 2011/11 and the 2011/12 editions of the top tier.
