= Anouar Diba =

Moroccan footballer

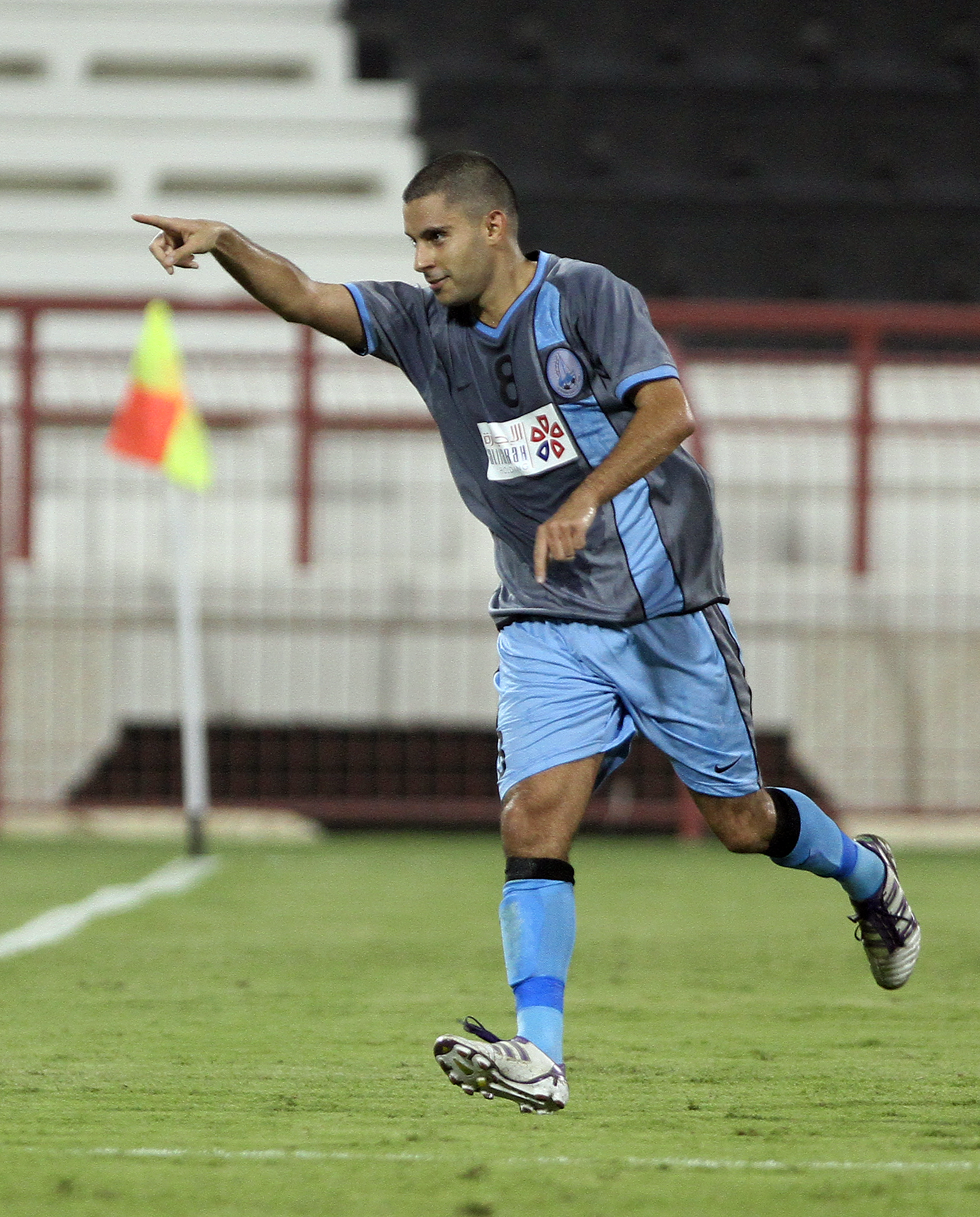

Personal information
- Full name: Anouar Diba
- Date of birth: 27 February 1983 (age 43)
- Place of birth: Utrecht, Netherlands
- Height: 1.71 m (5 ft 7 in)
- Position: Attacking midfielder

Youth career
- VV Utrecht
- PSV
- FC Utrecht
- Elinkwijk
- 2000–2002: NAC Breda

Senior career*
Years	Team	Apps	(Gls)
1999–2000	Elinkwijk		
2000–2007	NAC	113	(16)
2007–2009	Al-Wakrah	46	(14)
2009–2010	Al-Nasr	16	(1)
2010	Twente	1	(0)
2010–2011	Al-Wakrah	11	(9)
2011–2012	Lekhwiya	6	(2)
2012–2014	Al-Wakrah	35	(11)
2015–2019	Al Kharaitiyat	28	(6)
Total		256	(59)

International career
2006	Morocco	1	(0)
- * Club domestic league appearances and goals as of 12 July 2012 (UTC)

Anouar Diba (Riffian-Berber: ⴰⵏⵡⴰⵔ ⴷⵉⴱⴰ, born 27 February 1983) is a former footballer. Born in the Netherlands, he represented Morocco internationally.

== Club career ==
Diba is a forward who was made his debut in professional football during the 2002–03 season, being part of the NAC Breda squad. He spent five seasons with NAC in the Dutch Eredivisie and had a short spell at FC Twente in 2010.

In the winter of 2011, after sustaining a leg injury, Diba had to be treated in London, subsequently missing much of the league matches of his then-new club, Lekhwiya. As a result, Diba was cut from the squad. While numerous news outlets had reported Diba's departure, he himself had not received any official confirmation of being released by the club officials, and was first informed after receiving calls from his agent and friends. Before Diba's trip to London, Lekhwiya coach Djamel Belmadi had claimed Diba was one of the most prominent professionals in the team. This came as a surprise to Diba, as he was just 2–3 weeks from being released from the hospital.

On 22 January 2012, Diba joined Al-Wakrah, signing a contract until the end of the season.

== International career ==
He made his debut for Morocco in a November 2006 friendly match against Gabon.

== Post-playing career ==
Diba worked for NAC's youth academy and left his position and their technical staff in May 2026.
