= List of Al Sadd SC players =

Below is a list of notable footballers who have played for Al Sadd SC. Generally, this means players that have played 100 or more league matches for the club. However, some players who have played fewer matches are also included; this includes players that have had considerable success either at other clubs or at international level, as well as players who are well remembered by the supporters for particular reasons.

Players are listed in alphabetical order according to the date of their first-team official debut for the club. Appearances and goals are for first-team competitive matches only. Substitute appearances included. Statistics accurate as of 7 May 2021.

== List of Al Sadd SC players ==
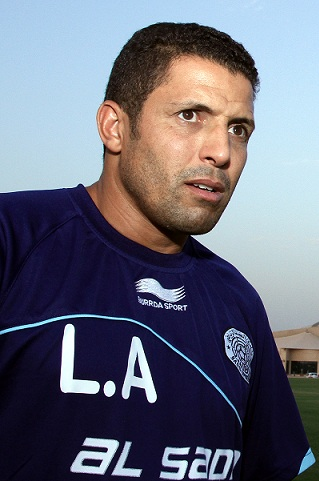
Hussein Ammouta

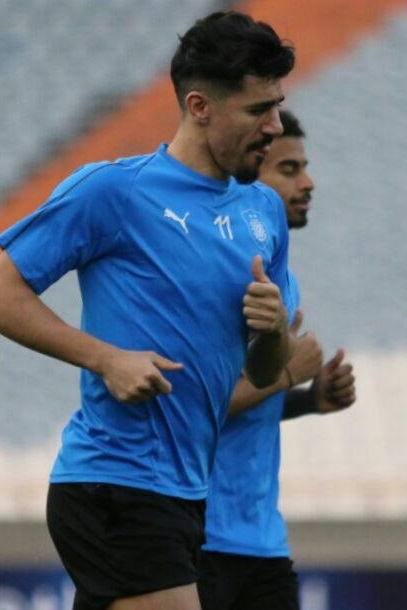
Baghdad Bounedjah

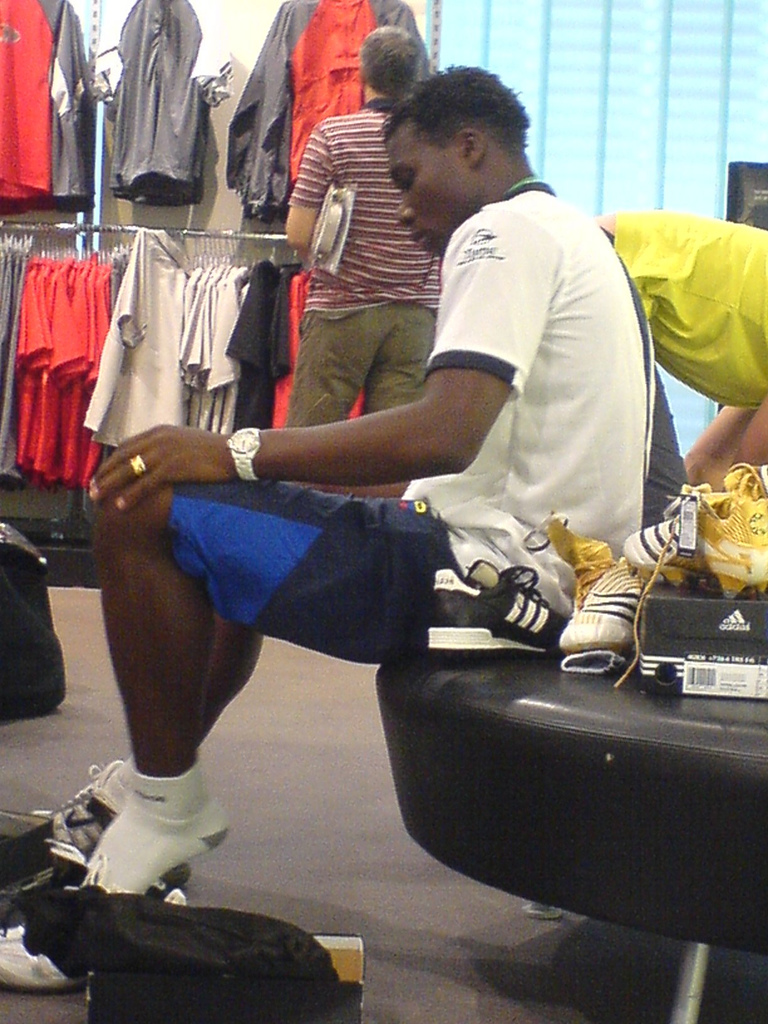
Carlos Tenorio

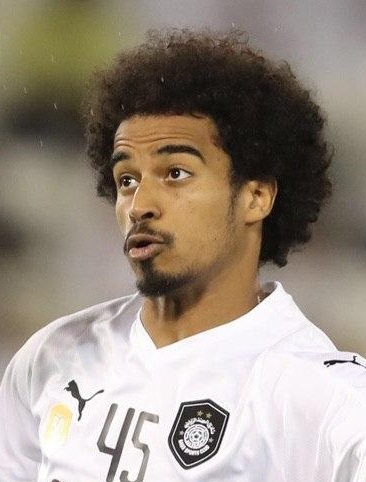
Akram Afif

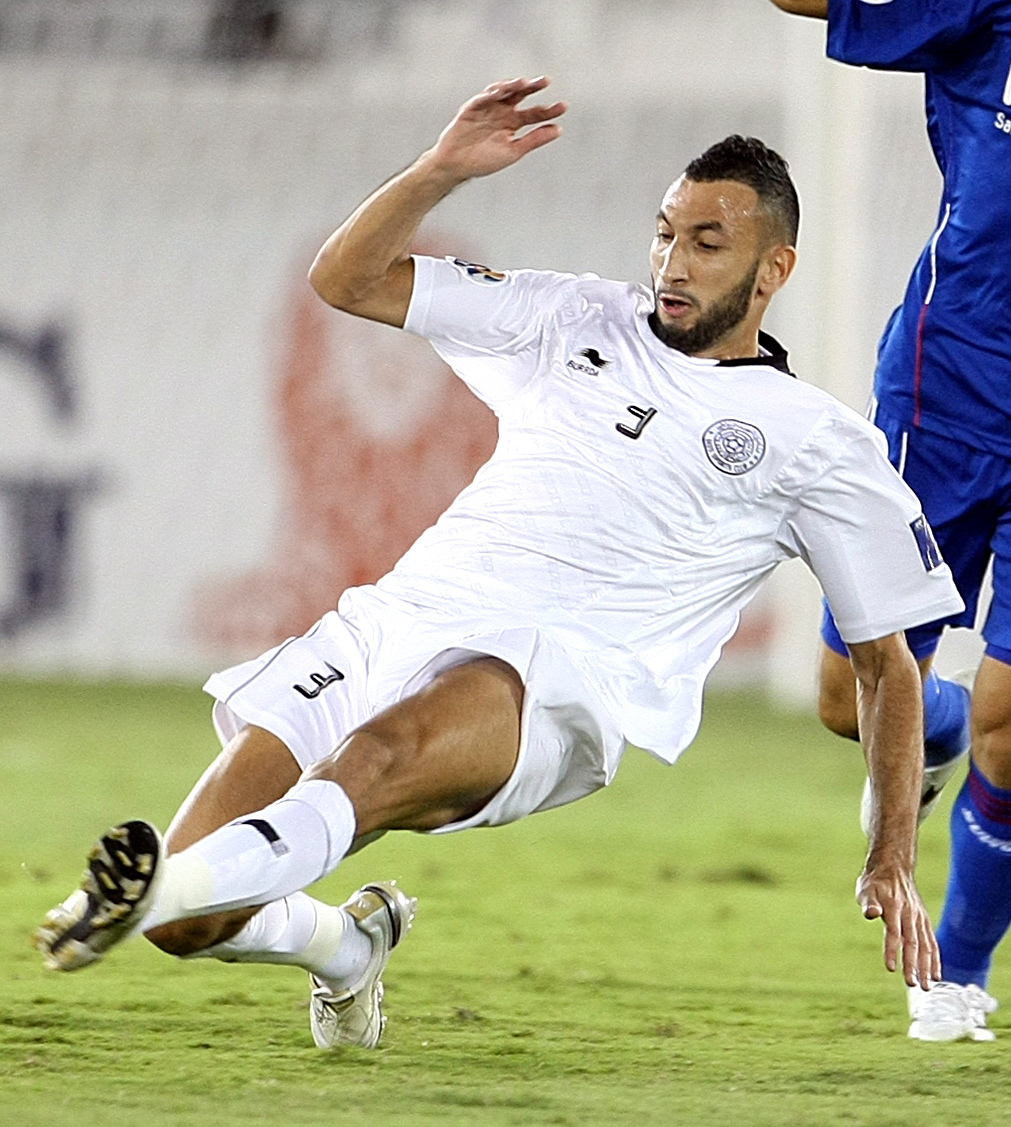
Nadir Belhadj

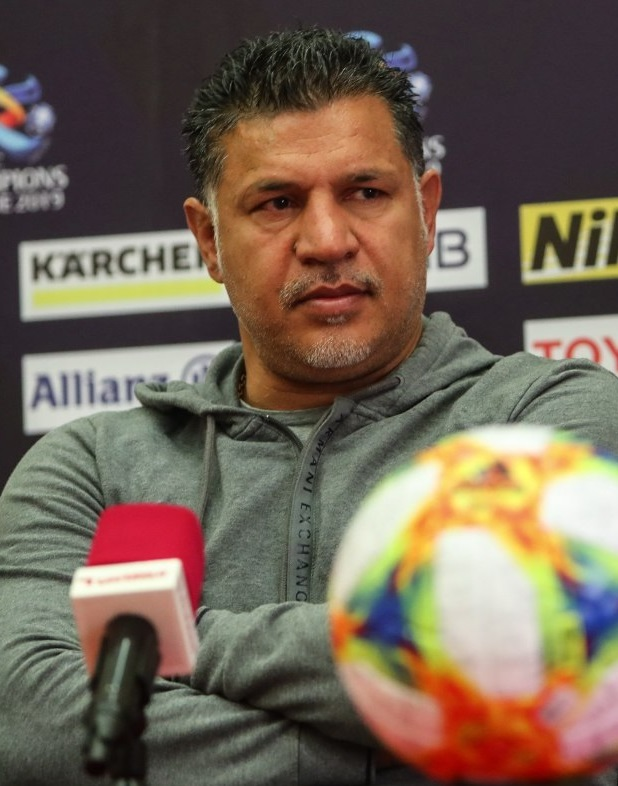
Ali Daei

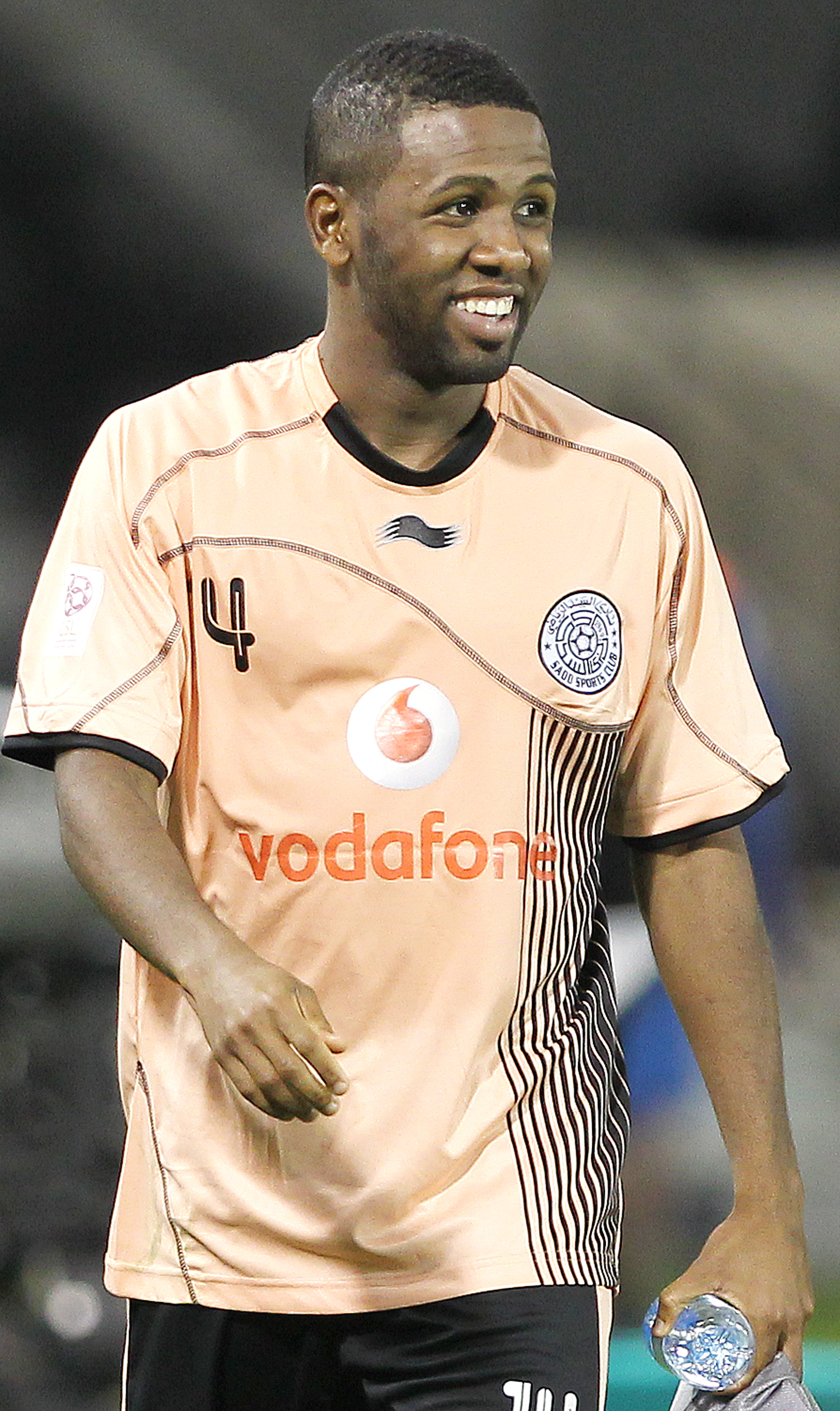
Khalfan Ibrahim

Name	Nat.	Position	Inter career	Appearances	Goals	Notes
Hassan Mattar	(Qatar)	FW	1975–82	?	?	
Badr Bilal	(Qatar)	FW	1979–91	?	?	
Hussein Ammouta	(Morocco)	FW	1997–2001	45	24	
Carlos Tenorio	(Ecuador)	FW	2003–09	80	62	
Bilal Abdulrahman	(Qatar)	MF	2002–06	43	4	
Afonso Alves	(Brazil)	FW	2009–10	13	2	
Mubarak Anber	(Qatar)	DF	1975–88	246	?	
Khalifa Ayil Al-Noufali	(Oman)	DF	2005–09	?	20	
Karim Bagheri	(Iran)	MF	2001–02	11	5	
Nadir Belhadj	(Algeria)	DF	2010–16	137	19	
Abdulla Al-Berik	(Qatar)	DF	2002–07 & 2012–13	57	1	
Talal Al-Bloushi	(Qatar)	MF	2003–16	107	3	
Ali Daei	(Iran)	FW	1996–97	16	10	
Hamid Derakhshan	(Iran)	MF	1991–92	15	3	
Hani Al-Dhabit	(Oman)	MF	2002–03	27	12	
Youssef Chippo	(Morocco)	MF	2003–05	?	?	
José Clayton	(Tunisia)	DF	2005–06	22	0	
Emerson Sheik	(Qatar)	FW	2005–07 & 2008–09	34	24	
Pascal Feindouno	(Guinea)	FW	2008–10	24	11	
Felipe Jorge Loureiro	(Brazil)	MF	2005–10	115	27	
Gabi	(Spain)	MF	2018–20	35	0	
Eric Gawu	(Ghana)	FW	2006–07	19	7	
Amir Ghalenoei	(Iran)	MF	1987–89	?	?	
Saoud Ghanem	(Qatar)	MF	2001–05	?	?	
Ebrahim Ghasempour	(Iran)	MF	1988–90	?	?	
Mohammed Gholam	(Qatar)	MF	1997–2010	?	6	
Grafite	(Brazil)	FW	2015	9	4	
Jugurtha Hamroun	(Algeria)	MF	2017–19	52	24	
Mesaad Al-Hamad	(Qatar)	DF	2004–14	152	4	
Khalfan Ibrahim	(Qatar)	FW	2004–17	237	76	
Ezzat Jadoua	(Qatar)	MF	2003–06 & 2016–17	?	?	
Hossein Kaebi	(Iran)	DF	2004–05	24	5	
Mohammed Kasola	(Qatar)	DF	2010–18	125	10	
Abdul Kader Keïta	(Ivory Coast)	FW	2002–05 & 2010–12	80	33	
Abdulla Koni	(Qatar)	DF	1996–2014	342	13	
Fahad Al Kuwari	(Qatar)	MF	1989–2003	?	?	
Jafal Rashed Al-Kuwari	(Qatar)	MF	1990–2009	?	?	
Frank Leboeuf	(France)	DF	2003–04	17	6	
Lee Jung-soo	(South Korea)	MF	2010–15	147	13	
Younis Mahmoud	(Iraq)	FW	2013	7	2	
Ibrahim Majid	(Qatar)	DF	2007–20	83	10	
Khalid Al Merreikhi	(Qatar)	MF	1989–94	?	?	
Magid Mohamed	(Qatar)	FW	2005–09, 2009–10 & 2011–12	105	28	
Pitso Mosimane	(South Africa)	MF	1996	12	0	
Bouchaib El Moubarki	(Morocco)	FW	2001–03	38	35	
Al-Mahdi Ali Mukhtar	(Qatar)	DF	2009–15	127	24	
Muriqui	(Brazil)	FW	2014–16	23	15	
Nasser Nabeel	(Qatar)	DF	2006–16	?	?	
Dahi Al Naemi	(Qatar)	DF	1995–2005	124	2	
Muhannad Naim	(Qatar)	GK	2009–17	17	0	
Nam Tae-hee	(South Korea)	MF	2019–21	68	18	
Abdurahman Nasser	(Qatar)	DF	2011–16	?	?	
Ali Nasser	(Qatar)	DF	2003–13	70	0	
Mohammed Rabia Al-Noobi	(Oman)	DF	2005–10	?	?	
Abdulnasser Al-Obaidly	(Qatar)	MF	1989–2005	?	?	
Ahmed Omar	(Qatar)	FW	1970–83	?	?	
Agyemang Opoku	(Ghana)	MF	2008–12	20	13	
Hassan Palang	(Qatar)	FW	2016–21	26	9	
Abedi Pele	(Ghana)	MF	1982–83	8	7	
Morteza Pouraliganji	(Iran)	DF	2016–18	49	9	
Raúl	(Spain)	FW	2012–14	39	11	
Wesam Rizik	(Qatar)	FW	2004–09 & 2010–13	145	16	
Jassim Al-Tamimi	(Qatar)	MF	2000–03	?	?	
John Utaka	(Nigeria)	FW	2001–02	27	14	
Sami Mohamed Wafa	(Qatar)	GK	1969–88	?	?	
Xavi	(Spain)	MF	2015–19	117	25	
Taher Zakaria	(Qatar)	DF	2006–16	?	?	
Mauro Zárate	(Argentina)	FW	2007–09	6	4	
Jasser Yahya	(Qatar)	MF	2012–17	29	1	
Mohammed Al Yazeedi	(Qatar)	MF	2006–14	?	?	
Hamood Al Yazidi	(Qatar)	DF	2007–12	?	?	
Saleh Al-Yazidi	(Qatar)	FW	2010–18	34	2	
Jean Paul Yontcha	(Burkina Faso)	FW	2006–08	30	18	
Hamza Sanhaji	(Qatar)	FW	2014–20	37	12	
Khalid Salman	(Qatar)	MF	1980–98	?	?	
Basel Samih	(Qatar)	GK	2000–11	21	0	
Ali Sanad	(Qatar)	DF	2006–10	32	4	
Mohamed Saqr	(Qatar)	GK	2003–14	186	1	
Meshaal Al-Shammeri	(Qatar)	FW	2015–18	30	5	
Radhi Shenaishil	(Iraq)	DF	1999–2001	?	?	
Majdi Siddiq	(Qatar)	MF	2009–11	27	3	
Ahmed Suhail	(Qatar)	DF	2017–present	23	0	
Rodrigo Tabata	(Qatar)	FW	2014–15 & 2020–present	57	26	
Saad Al Sheeb	(Qatar)	GK	2008–present	235	0	
Tarek Salman	(Qatar)	DF	2018–present	56	1	
Pedro Miguel	(Qatar)	DF	2016–present	112	6	
Ali Assadalla	(Qatar)	MF	2012–present	158	22	
Santi Cazorla	(Spain)	MF	2020–present	37	19	
Hashim Ali	(Qatar)	MF	2019–present	43	5	
André Ayew	(Ghana)	MF	2021–present	0	0	
Guilherme dos Santos Torres	(Brazil)	MF	2020–present	29	1	
Akram Afif	(Qatar)	FW	2018–present	71	61	
Musab Kheder	(Qatar)	DF	2012–present	89	3	
Baghdad Bounedjah	(Algeria)	FW	2015–present	156	166	
Boualem Khoukhi	(Qatar)	DF	2017–present	75	9	
Hassan Al-Haydos	(Qatar)	FW	2007–present	401	115	
Salem Al-Hajri	(Qatar)	DF	2016–present	73	1	
Ahmed Sayyar	(Qatar)	FW	2017–present	29	4	
Abdelkarim Hassan	(Qatar)	DF	2010–present	178	26	
Jung Woo-young	(South Korea)	MF	2018–present	94	3	

Nationalities are indicated by the corresponding FIFA country code.

== List of all-time appearances ==
This list of all-time appearances for Al Sadd SC contains football players who have played for Al Sadd SC and have managed to accrue 100 or more appearances.

Bold Still playing competitive football in Al Sadd SC. (Note: Since 1997–98 season statistics of all the games, some players statistics only Qatar Stars League and AFC Champions League. Statistics correct as of game against Al-Arabi on May 7, 2021.)

#	Name	Position	League	Cup	Others^{1}	Asia^{2}	TOTAL	Honours				
#	Name	Position	League	Cup	Others^{1}	Asia^{2}	TOTAL	League	Cup	Others	Asia	TOTAL
1	(Qatar) Hassan Al-Haydos	RW / LW / AM	271	0	0	72	343	4	4	8	1	17
2	(Qatar) Khalfan Ibrahim	RW / LW / AM	208	0	0	45	253	4	3	5	1	13
3	(Qatar) Abdulla Koni	CB	222	0	0	19	241	5	5	9	1	20
4	(Qatar) Abdelkarim Hassan	LB	173	0	0	65	238	3	5	5	1	14
5	(Qatar) Saad Al Sheeb	GK	181	0	0	54	235	3	4	6	1	14
6	(Qatar) Mohamed Saqr	GK	203	0	0	26	229	3	2	4	1	10
7	(Qatar) Talal Al-Bloushi	CM / DM	195	0	0	29	224	4	2	5	1	12
8	(Qatar) Ali Assadalla	CM	153	0	0	43	196	4	3	4	–	11
9	(Qatar) Mohammed Kasola	CB / RB / DM	151	0	0	39	190	1	1	2	1	5
10	(Algeria) Nadir Belhadj	LB	137	0	0	36	173	1	2	1	1	5
11	(Algeria) Baghdad Bounedjah	ST	99	13	9	33	154	3	3	5	–	11
12	(Qatar) Ibrahim Majid	LB / CB / RB	124	0	0	23	147	1	3	3	1	8
13	(South Korea) Lee Jung-soo	LB / CB	112	0	0	32	144	1	2	1	1	5
14	(Qatar) Pedro Miguel	CB	105	0	0	37	142	2	3	5	–	10
15	(Qatar) Boualem Khoukhi	LB / CB / LM	71	10	8	43	132	2	1	3	–	6
16	(Spain) Xavi	CM / DM / AM	82	9	7	17	115	1	1	2	–	4
17	(Qatar) Akram Afif	LW	58	10	6	32	106	3	2	3	–	8

^{1} ^{Includes the Qatar Cup and Sheikh Jassim Cup.} ^{2} ^{Includes the Cup Winners' Cup, Champions League and FIFA Club World Cup.}

== Players from Al Sadd SC to Europe ==
Player	Pos	Club	League	Transfer fee	Source
(Iran) Ali Daei	FW	Arminia Bielefeld	(Germany) Bundesliga	Free transfer	
(Ivory Coast) Abdul Kader Keïta	FW	Lille	(France) Ligue 1	Undisclosed	
(Senegal) Mamadou Niang	FW	Arles-Avignon	(France) Ligue 1	Free transfer	
