= List of Al Sadd SC international footballers =

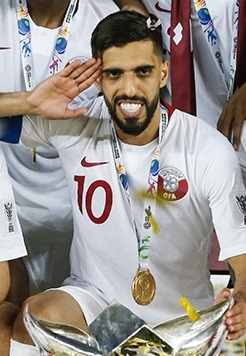
Hassan Al-Haydos The most Al Sadd SC player has played with a national team with 184 matches with Qatar.

This is a list of players, past and present, who have been capped by their country in international football whilst playing for Al Sadd Sports Club from twelve countries. The first tournament in which Al Sadd SC players participated was the Summer Olympics in 1984 with four players, including Khalid Salman who scored a brace against France which account for the only two goals Qatar scored during the tournament. At the end of the year Qatar participated for the second time in a row in the AFC Asian Cup and for the first time there were players from the club and Salman led Qatar to the only victory against South Korea. The first non-Qatari player to participate in the AFC Asian Cup was the Iranian Ali Daei in 1996 where he ranked third,

== Players ==
Key
GK	Goalkeeper
DF	Defender
MF	Midfielder
FW	Forward
Bold	Still playing competitive football

=== Qatari players ===
Al Sadd SC Qatari international footballers
Name	Position	Date of first cap	Debut against	Date of last cap	Final match against	Caps	Ref
Emerson Sheik	FW	4 Mar 2008	Bahrain	26 Mar 2008	Iraq	3	
Mesaad Al-Hamad	DF	15 Nov 2006	Uzbekistan	5 Jan 2013	United Arab Emirates	57	
Khalfan Ibrahim	FW	16 Aug 2006	Bangladesh	13 Oct 2015	Maldives	90	
Ezzat Jadoua	MF	5 Jun 2004	Kyrgyzstan	25 Jul 2004	China	5	
Mohammed Kasola	DF	3 Mar 2010	Slovenia	13 Jun 2017	South Korea	67	
Abdulla Koni	DF	19 Sep 1997	Kuwait	14 Jan 2009	Oman	59	
Fahad Al Kuwari	MF	27 Feb 1990	United Arab Emirates	13 Oct 2001	China	30	
Ibrahim Majid	DF	25 Jun 2007	Turkmenistan	13 Jun 2017	South Korea	100	
Magid Mohamed	FW	11 Oct 2005	Iraq	28 May 2012	Palestine	36	
Al-Mahdi Ali Mukhtar	DF	23 Jan 2012	Sweden	5 June 2015	Scotland	22	
Dahi Al Naemi	DF	19 Sep 1997	Kuwait	31 Mar 2004	Jordan	53	
Ali Nasser	DF	17 Nov 2004	Jordan	31 May 2009	Iraq	21	
Abdulnasser Al-Obaidly	MF	11 Oct 1992	Hungary	4 Oct 2001	United Arab Emirates	49	
Wesam Rizik	FW	8 Sep 2004	Laos	11 Jun 2013	North Korea	81	
Jassim Al-Tamimi	MF	27 Sep 2000	Iran	20 Nov 2002	Iraq	27	
Taher Zakaria	DF	11 Aug 2008	Iran	8 Oct 2012	Jordan	4	
Khalid Salman	MF	11 Dec 1987	Iraq	5 Oct 1994	Japan	11	
Ali Sanad	DF	13 Jan 2008	Syria	13 Jan 2008	Syria	1	
Mohamed Saqr	GK	19 Nov 2003	Singapore	1 Apr 2009	Bahrain	59	
Majdi Siddiq	MF	8 Oct 2009	Croatia	17 Jul 2011	India	10	
**Saad Al Sheeb**	GK	30 Dec 2009	North Korea	29 Mar 2022	Slovenia	79	
**Tarek Salman**	DF	7 Sep 2018	China	26 Mar 2022	Bulgaria	51	
**Ali Assadalla**	MF	23 Jan 2012	Sweden	26 Mar 2022	Bulgaria	56	
**Akram Afif**	FW	21 Mar 2018	Iraq	29 Mar 2022	Slovenia	54	
**Boualem Khoukhi**	DF	6 Jun 2017	North Korea	29 Mar 2022	Slovenia	62	
**Hassan Al-Haydos**	MF	11 Aug 2008	Iran	18 Dec 2021	Egypt	158	
**Salem Al-Hajri**	DF	17 Jan 2017	Moldova	29 Mar 2022	Slovenia	23	
**Abdelkarim Hassan**	DF	18 Nov 2010	Haiti	29 Mar 2022	Slovenia	114	

=== Foreign players ===
Al Sadd SC Foreign international footballers
Name	Position	Date of first cap	Debut against	Date of last cap	Final match against	Caps	Ref
(Ecuador) Carlos Tenorio	FW	6 Sep 2003	Venezuela	10 Jun 2009	Argentina	30	
(Algeria) Nadir Belhadj	DF	11 Aug 2011	Gabon	12 Nov 2011	Tunisia	6	
(Iran) Ali Daei	FW	25 Nov 1996	Turkmenistan	13 Jun 1997	Syria	13	
(Iran) Hamid Derakhshan	MF	27 Sep 1991	Algeria	13 Oct 1991	Algeria	2	
(Guinea) Pascal Feindouno	FW	11 Feb 2009	Cameroon	21 Jun 2009	Malawi	5	
(Ivory Coast) Abdul Kader Keïta	FW	30 Apr 2003	Morocco	9 Jun 2012	Morocco	16	
(South Korea) **Nam Tae-hee**	MF	10 Oct 2019	Sri Lanka	13 Jun 2021	Lebanon	8	
(Oman) Mohammed Rabia Al-Noobi	DF	13 Feb 2006	Iraq	6 Jan 2010	Indonesia	44	
(Ghana) Abedi Pele	MF	13 Feb 1982	Benin	1 May 1983	Nigeria	19	
(Nigeria) John Utaka	FW	13 Sep 2001	South Korea	7 Jun 2002	Sweden	5	
(Ghana) **André Ayew**	MF	3 Sep 2021	Ethiopia	18 Jan 2022	Comoros	9	
(Algeria) **Baghdad Bounedjah**	FW	12 Nov 2016	Nigeria	20 Jan 2022	Ivory Coast	52	
(Tunisia) José Clayton	DF	17 Aug 2005	Kenya	1 March 2006	Serbia and Montenegro	8	
(Senegal) Mamadou Niang	FW	9 Oct 2011	Mauritius	29 Jan 2012	Libya	6	

== Players in international competitions ==
=== Asian Cup players ===
(Singapore) 1984 Asian Cup

- (Qatar) Mubarak Anber
- (Qatar) Mohammed Al Ammari
- (Qatar) Khalid Salman
- (Qatar) Sami Mohamed Wafa

(Qatar) 1988 Asian Cup

- (Qatar) Yousef Al-Adsani
- (Qatar) Mohammed Al Ammari
- (Qatar) Khalid Salman

(Japan) 1992 Asian Cup

- (Qatar) Zamel Al Kuwari
- (Qatar) Yousef Al-Adsani
- (Qatar) Fahad Al Kuwari
- (Qatar) Abdulnasser Al-Obaidly
- (Qatar) Jaffal Rashid
- (Qatar) Khalid Khamis Al-Sulaiti

(United Arab Emirates) 1996 Asian Cup

- (Iran) Ali Daei

(Lebanon) 2000 Asian Cup

- (Qatar) Abdulnasser Al Obaidly
- (Qatar) Dahi Saad Al Naemi
- (Qatar) Fahad Al Kuwari
- (Qatar) Jassim Al-Tamimi
- (Qatar) Adel Jadou

(China) 2004 Asian Cup

- (Qatar) Wesam Rizik
- (Qatar) Ezzat Jadoua
- (Qatar) Mohammed Gholam

(Indonesia) (Thailand) (Vietnam) (Malaysia) 2007 Asian Cup

- (Qatar) Mohamed Saqr
- (Qatar) Mesaad Al-Hamad
- (Qatar) Ali Nasser
- (Qatar) Ali Afif
- (Qatar) Magid Mohamed
- (Qatar) Talal Al-Bloushi
- (Qatar) Mohammed Gholam
- (Qatar) Wesam Rizik
- (Qatar) Ibrahim Majid
- (Qatar) Abdulla Koni
- (Oman) Mohammed Rabia Al-Noobi

(Qatar) 2011 Asian Cup

- (Qatar) Mohammed Kasola
- (Qatar) Hassan Al Haydos
- (Qatar) Wesam Rizik
- (Qatar) Mesaad Al-Hamad
- (Qatar) Yusef Ahmed
- (Qatar) Ibrahim Majid
- (Qatar) Khalfan Ibrahim
- (Qatar) Talal Al-Bloushi
- (Qatar) Ali Afif
- (Qatar) Saad Al Sheeb
- (South Korea) Lee Jung-soo

(Australia) 2015 Asian Cup

- (Qatar) Abdelkarim Hassan
- (Qatar) Almahdi Ali Mukhtar
- (Qatar) Ali Assadalla
- (Qatar) Khalfan Ibrahim
- (Qatar) Hassan Al-Haydos
- (Qatar) Ibrahim Majid
- (Qatar) Saad Al Sheeb

(United Arab Emirates) 2019 Asian Cup

- (Qatar) Saad Al Sheeb
- (Qatar) Ró-Ró
- (Qatar) Abdelkarim Hassan
- (Qatar) Tarek Salman
- (Qatar) Hamid Ismail
- (Qatar) Hassan Al-Haydos
- (Qatar) Akram Afif
- (Qatar) Salem Al-Hajri
- (Qatar) Boualem Khoukhi
- (South Korea) Jung Woo-young

(Qatar) 2023 Asian Cup

- (Qatar) Saad Al-Sheeb
- (Qatar) Pedro Miguel
- (Qatar) Mohammed Waad
- (Qatar) Tarek Salman
- (Qatar) Ali Assadalla
- (Qatar) Yusuf Abdurisag
- (Qatar) Hassan Al-Haydos
- (Qatar) Akram Afif
- (Qatar) Boualem Khoukhi
- (Qatar) Meshaal Barsham
- (Qatar) Mostafa Meshaal

=== Africa Cup of Nations, Copa América, Gold Cup and Olympic players ===
(United States) 1984 Summer Olympics

- (Qatar) Yousef Al-Adsani
- (Qatar) Mubarak Anber
- (Qatar) Mohamed Al-Ammari
- (Qatar) Khalid Salman

(Egypt) 2006 Africa Cup of Nations

- (Tunisia) José Clayton

(Angola) 2010 Africa Cup of Nations

- (Ghana) Opoku Agyemang

(Equatorial Guinea) (Gabon) 2012 Africa Cup of Nations

- (Ivory Coast) Abdul Kader Keïta
- (Senegal) Mamadou Niang

(Brazil) 2016 Summer Olympics

- (Algeria) Baghdad Bounedjah

(Gabon) 2017 Africa Cup of Nations

- (Algeria) Baghdad Bounedjah

(Egypt) 2019 Africa Cup of Nations

- (Algeria) Baghdad Bounedjah

(Brazil) 2019 Copa América

- (Qatar) Saad Al Sheeb
- (Qatar) Ró-Ró
- (Qatar) Abdelkarim Hassan
- (Qatar) Tarek Salman
- (Qatar) Hamid Ismail
- (Qatar) Hassan Al-Haydos
- (Qatar) Akram Afif
- (Qatar) Salem Al-Hajri
- (Qatar) Boualem Khoukhi

(United States) 2021 CONCACAF Gold Cup

- (Qatar) Saad Al Sheeb
- (Qatar) Ró-Ró
- (Qatar) Abdelkarim Hassan
- (Qatar) Mohammed Waad
- (Qatar) Tarek Salman
- (Qatar) Ahmed Suhail
- (Qatar) Hassan Al-Haydos
- (Qatar) Akram Afif
- (Qatar) Musab Kheder
- (Qatar) Boualem Khoukhi
- (Qatar) Yusuf Abdurisag
- (Qatar) Meshaal Barsham

(Cameroon) 2021 Africa Cup of Nations

- (Algeria) Baghdad Bounedjah
- (Ghana) André Ayew

(United States) 2023 CONCACAF Gold Cup

- (Qatar) Tarek Salman
- (Qatar) Mahdi Salem
- (Qatar) Ali Assadalla
- (Qatar) Mohammed Waad
- (Qatar) Musab Kheder
- (Qatar) Meshaal Barsham

=== World Cup players ===
(South Korea) (Japan) 2002 FIFA World Cup

- (Nigeria) John Utaka

(Qatar) 2022 FIFA World Cup

- (Qatar) Saad Al-Sheeb
- (Qatar) Ró-Ró
- (Qatar) Abdelkarim Hassan
- (Qatar) Mohammed Waad
- (Qatar) Tarek Salman
- (Qatar) Ali Assadalla
- (Qatar) Hassan Al-Haydos
- (Qatar) Akram Afif
- (Qatar) Musab Kheder
- (Qatar) Boualem Khoukhi
- (Qatar) Salem Al-Hajri
- (Qatar) Meshaal Barsham
- (Qatar) Mostafa Meshaal
- (Ghana) André Ayew
- (South Korea) Jung Woo-young

(Canada) (Mexico) (United States) 2026 FIFA World Cup

- (Qatar) Akram Afif
- (Qatar) Meshaal Barsham
- (Qatar) Hassan Al-Haydos
- (Qatar) Boualem Khoukhi
- (Qatar) Pedro Miguel

== Honours ==
Qatar

- AFC Asian Cup: 2019, 2023

Algeria

- Africa Cup of Nations: 2019
- FIFA Arab Cup: 2021
