= 2013–14 Al Sadd SC season =

Al Sadd SC
2013–14 season
- Chairman: Muhammed bin Khalifa Al Thani
- Head coach: Hussein Amotta
- Stadium: Jassim bin Hamad Stadium
- Qatar Stars League: Runner-up
- Emir of Qatar Cup: winners
- Crown Prince Cup: Semi-finals
- Champions League: Round of 16
- Top goalscorer: League: Khalfan Ibrahim (14); All: Khalfan Ibrahim (17)

In the 2013–14 season, Al Sadd SC competed in the Qatar Stars League for the 41st season, as well as the Emir of Qatar Cup the Crown Prince Cup and the Champions League.

== Squad list ==
Players and squad numbers last updated on 18 November 2013.
Note: Flags indicate national team as has been defined under FIFA eligibility rules. Players may hold more than one non-FIFA nationality.

No.	Nat.	Position	Name	Date of Birth (Age)	Signed from
Goalkeepers
1	(Qatar)	GK	Saad Al Sheeb	19 February 1990 (aged 23)	(Qatar) Al Sailiya
22	(Qatar)	GK	Muhannad Naim	28 January 1993 (aged 20)	(Belgium) Eupen
30	(Qatar)	GK	Mohamed Saqr	17 May 1981 (aged 32)	(Qatar) Al-Khor
Defenders
2	(Qatar)	RB	Mesaad Al-Hamad	11 February 1986 (aged 27)	(Qatar) Youth system
3	(Qatar)	LB	Abdelkarim Hassan	28 August 1993 (aged 20)	(Qatar) Youth system
5	(Qatar)	CB	Almahdi Ali Mukhtar	2 March 1992 (aged 21)	(Qatar) Aspire Academy
19	(Qatar)	RB	Nasser Nabeel	11 February 1990 (aged 23)	(Qatar) Youth system
26	(Qatar)	CB	Taher Zakaria	22 August 1988 (aged 25)	(Qatar) Youth system
32	(Qatar)	CB	Ibrahim Majid	12 May 1990 (aged 23)	(Qatar) Al Wakrah
40	(South Korea)	CB	Lee Jung-Soo	8 January 1980 (aged 33)	(Japan) Kashima Antlers
39	(Algeria)	LB	Nadir Belhadj	18 June 1982 (aged 31)	(England) Portsmouth
Midfielders
6	(Qatar)	DM	Mohammed Kasola	13 August 1986 (aged 27)	(Qatar) Al-Khor
8	(Qatar)	AM	Mohammed Al Yazeedi	30 October 1988 (aged 25)	(Qatar) Youth system
10	(Qatar)	AM	Khalfan Ibrahim	18 February 1988 (aged 25)	(Qatar) Al Arabi
12	(Qatar)	AM	Rodrigo Tabata	19 November 1980 (aged 33)	(Qatar) Al Rayyan
13	(Qatar)	AM	Ali Assadalla	19 January 1993 (aged 20)	(Bahrain) Al Muharraq
15	(Qatar)	CM	Talal Al-Bloushi	22 May 1986 (aged 27)	(Kuwait) Al Naser
27	(Qatar)	CM	Jasser Yahya	19 December 1992 (aged 21)	(Qatar) Youth system
Forwards
7	(Spain)	ST	Raúl	27 June 1977 (aged 36)	(Germany) Schalke 04
9	(Senegal)	ST	Mamadou Niang	13 October 1979 (aged 34)	(Turkey) Fenerbahçe
11	(Qatar)	RW	Hassan Al Haidos	11 December 1990 (aged 23)	(Qatar) Youth system
16	(Qatar)	ST / SS	Abdulaziz Al Ansari	19 February 1992 (aged 21)	(Qatar) Al Kharaitiyat
17	(Qatar)	RW	Saleh Bader Al Yazidi	10 February 1993 (aged 20)	(Qatar) Youth system
20	(Qatar)	LW	Yusef Ahmed	14 October 1988 (aged 25)	Qatar SC
37	(Qatar)		Hamza Sanhaji	22 April 1994 (aged 19)	(Qatar) Youth system
	(Brazil)		Leandro	12 February 1985 (aged 28)	(Japan) Gamba Osaka

== Competitions ==
=== Overview ===
Competition	Record								Started round	Final position / round	First match	Last match
Competition	G	W	D	L	GF	GA	GD	Win %	Started round	Final position / round	First match	Last match
Qatar Stars League	26	13	8	5	54	30	+24	50.00	Matchday 1	4th	13 September 2013	11 April 2014
Emir of Qatar Cup	3	3	0	0	7	1	+6	100.00	Quarter-final	Winner	3 May 2014	17 May 2014
Crown Prince Cup	1	0	0	1	0	1	−1	0.00	Semi-finals		19 April 2014	
Champions League	8	2	4	2	10	16	−6	25.00	Group stage	Round of 16	26 February 2014	14 May 2014
Total	38	18	12	8	71	48	+23	47.37				

Updated to match played 26 November 2019
Source: Competitions

=== Qatar Stars League ===
==== League table ====
Pos	Team	Pld	W	D	L	GF	GA	GD	Pts	Qualification or relegation
1	Lekhwiya (C)	26	16	5	5	55	30	+25	53	2015 AFC Champions League group stage
2	El Jaish	26	14	6	6	39	27	+12	48	2015 AFC Champions League 2nd qualifying round
3	Al Sadd	26	13	8	5	54	30	+24	47	2015 AFC Champions League 2nd qualifying round
4	Al-Sailiya	26	11	9	6	45	37	+8	42	
5	Al-Arabi	26	11	6	9	41	41	0	39	2015 GCC Champions League group stage

Updated to match(es) played on 11 April 2014. Source: RSSSF
Rules for classification: 1) points; 2) goal difference; 3) number of goals scored.
(C) Champions

==== Results summary ====
Overall								Home						Away					
Pld	W	D	L	GF	GA	GD	Pts	W	D	L	GF	GA	GD	W	D	L	GF	GA	GD
26	13	8	5	54	30	+24	47	7	2	4	29	17	+12	6	6	1	25	13	+12

Last updated: 29 December 2014.
Source: Competitive matches

==== Results by round ====
Round	1	2	3	4	5	6	7	8	9	10	11	12	13	14	15	16	17	18	19	20	21	22	23	24	25	26
Ground	H	H	A	A	H	A	A	A	H	H	A	H	H	A	A	H	H	A	H	H	H	A	A	H	A	A
Result	W	W	L	D	W	D	D	W	W	W	W	L	D	D	D	L	L	W	D	W	W	D	W	L	W	W
Position	2	1	3	5	3	5	4	3	2	2	1	1	1	1	2	2	4	3	3	3	3	3	2	3	3	3

Source: Competitive matches
A = Away; H = Home; W = Win; D = Draw; L = Loss

==== Matches ====
13 September 2013 Round 1	Al Sadd	1–0	Al Rayyan	Doha
19:15	Belhadj 50'	Report		Stadium: Jassim Bin Hamad Stadium; Referee: Abdullah Al Bloushi

20 September 2013 Round 2	Al Sadd	1–0	Al Ahli	Doha
21:30	Ibrahim 20'	Report		Stadium: Jassim Bin Hamad Stadium; Referee: Khamis Al Marri

27 September 2013 Round 3	El Jaish	1–0	Al Sadd	Doha
21:30	Muntari 14'	Report		Stadium: Abdullah bin Khalifa Stadium; Referee: Abdulrahman Abdou

4 October 2013 Round 4	Umm Salal	4–4	Al Sadd	Doha
19:15	El Assas 2'; Koné 9', 28'; Cabore 90'	Report	Al Haidos 23'; Mukhtar 45+1'; Ibrahim 48', 64'	Stadium: Suheim bin Hamad Stadium; Referee: Khamis Mohamed Al Kuwari

19 October 2013 Round 5	Al Sadd	4–0	Qatar SC	Doha
19:15	Mukhtar 13'; Douglão 50' (o.g.); Al Haidos 66'; Ibrahim 90+3'	Report		Stadium: Jassim Bin Hamad Stadium; Referee: Abdullah Al Bloushi

25 October 2013 Round 6	Al-Wakrah	0–0	Al Sadd	Al Wakrah
19:15		Report		Stadium: Saoud bin Abdulrahman Stadium; Referee: Banjar Al Dosari

2 November 2013 Round 7	Al-Gharafa	1–1	Al Sadd	Al-Rayyan
18:30	Nenê 27'	Report	Assadalla 40'	Stadium: Thani bin Jassim Stadium; Referee: Abdulrahman Al Jassim

7 November 2013 Round 8	Al-Khor	1–2	Al Sadd	Al Khor
18:30	Awal 24'	Report	Raúl 31'; Ibrahim 69'	Stadium: Al-Khor SC Stadium; Referee: Khamis Al Marri

24 November 2013 Round 9	Al Sadd	2–0	Al-Arabi	Doha
18:30	Belhadj 3'; Al Yazidi 90+3'	Report		Stadium: Jassim Bin Hamad Stadium; Referee: Fahad Al Marri

30 November 2013 Round 10	Al Sadd	5–1	Al Mu'aidar	Doha
16:00	Hassan 50'; Assadalla 60'; Kasola 70'; Leandro 74'; Al Yazidi 79'	Report	Sawaneh 80'	Stadium: Jassim Bin Hamad Stadium; Referee: Abdullah Al Athbah

5 December 2013 Round 11	Al Sailiya	2–5	Al Sadd	Al Rayyan
16:00	Diba Ilunga 45+2'; Aaish 71'	Report	Tavares 17' (o.g.); Leandro 27', 83'; Jung-Soo 39'; Belhadj 59'	Stadium: Ahmed bin Ali Stadium; Referee: Banjar Al Dosari

12 December 2013 Round 12	Al Sadd	2–3	Lekhwiya	Doha
18:30	Ibrahim 56', 60' (pen.)	Report	Tae-hee 8', 27'; Soria 44' (pen.)	Stadium: Jassim Bin Hamad Stadium; Referee: Craig Thomson (Scotland)

16 December 2013 Round 13	Al Sadd	1–1	Al Kharaitiyat	Doha
18:30	Zakaria 63'	Report	Jassem 80' (pen.)	Stadium: Jassim Bin Hamad Stadium; Referee: Khamis Mohamed Al Kuwari

10 January 2014 Round 14	Al Rayyan	2–2	Al Sadd	Al Rayyan
18:45	Mohsin 51'; Barry 90+3'	Report	Al Haidos 27', 80'	Stadium: Ahmed bin Ali Stadium; Referee: Banjar Al Dosari

17 January 2014 Round 15	Al Ahli	0–0	Al Sadd	Doha
16:15		Report		Stadium: Grand Hamad Stadium; Referee: Abdullah Al Bloushi

24 January 2014 Round 16	Al Sadd	1–2	El Jaish	Doha
19:00	Niang 55'	Report	Kembo Ekoko 49'; Muntari 51'	Stadium: Jassim Bin Hamad Stadium; Referee: Abdulrahman Abdou

28 January 2014 Round 17	Al Sadd	1–2	Umm Salal	Doha
19:00	Jung-Soo 21'	Report	Victor Simões 43' (pen.); Cabore 70'	Stadium: Jassim Bin Hamad Stadium; Referee: Jonas Eriksson (Sweden)

1 February 2014 Round 18	Qatar SC	0–1	Al Sadd	Doha
19:00		Report	Al Haidos 90'	Stadium: Suheim bin Hamad Stadium; Referee: Khamis Al Marri

6 February 2014 Round 19	Al Sadd	2–2	Al-Wakrah	Doha
19:15	Tabata 56'; Belhadj 89'	Report	Sáez 11', 80'	Stadium: Jassim Bin Hamad Stadium; Referee: Fahad Al Marri

14 February 2014 Round 20	Al Sadd	4–2	Al-Gharafa	Doha
19:15	Belhadj 11'; Tabata 23'; Raúl 51'; Ibrahim 68' (pen.)	Report	López 41'; Alawi 61'	Stadium: Jassim Bin Hamad Stadium; Referee: Abdulrahman Al Jassim

20 February 2014 Round 21	Al Sadd	4–2	Al-Khor	Doha
16:45	Tabata 12', 23', 45+3'; Ibrahim 71'	Report	Júlio César 5'; William 38'	Stadium: Jassim Bin Hamad Stadium; Referee: Abdulrahman Abdou

8 March 2014 Round 22	Al-Arabi	1–1	Al Sadd	Doha
20:30	Wanderley 74'	Report	Ibrahim 69'	Stadium: Grand Hamad Stadium; Referee: Banjar Al Dosari

23 March 2014 Round 23	Al Mu'aidar	1–4	Al Sadd	Al-Rayyan
18:15	Campos 45+2'	Report	Ibrahim 6' (pen.), 90+1'; Kasola 47'; Yusef Ahmed 70'	Stadium: Thani bin Jassim Stadium; Referee: Abdullah Al Bloushi

28 March 2014 Round 24	Al Sadd	1–2	Al Sailiya	Doha
18:15	Ibrahim 10' (pen.)	Report	Camacho 52'; Aaish 59' (pen.)	Stadium: Jassim Bin Hamad Stadium; Referee: Fahad Al Marri

6 April 2014 Round 25	Lekhwiya	0–2	Al Sadd	Doha
21:45		Report	Hassan 65'; Medany 87'	Stadium: Abdullah bin Khalifa Stadium; Referee: Khamis Mohamed Al Kuwari

11 April 2014 Round 26	Al Kharaitiyat	0–3	Al Sadd	Doha
19:30		Report	Belhadj 18'; Ibrahim 50'; Abdulrahman 71' (o.g.)	Stadium: Abdullah bin Khalifa Stadium; Referee: Khamis Al Marri

=== Emir of Qatar Cup ===
3 May 2014 Quarter-finals	Al Arabi	0–2	Al Sadd	Doha
17:15				Stadium: Suheim Bin Hamad Stadium

10 May 2014 Semi-finals	Al Sadd	2–1	Al Gharafa	Doha
19:45				Stadium: Grand Hamad Stadium

17 May 2014 Final	Al Sadd	3–0	Al-Sailiya	Doha
19:45	Raúl 32'; Majid 63', 90+3'			Stadium: Khalifa International Stadium

=== Crown Prince Cup ===
19 April 2014 Semi-finals	El Jaish	1–0	Al-Sadd	Doha
17:15	Go Seul-Ki 15'	Report; Report		Stadium: Suheim Bin Hamad Stadium

== AFC Champions League ==
=== Group stage ===
==== Group D ====
Pos	Team	Pld	W	D	L	GF	GA	GD	Pts	Qualification	HIL	SAD	AHL	SEP
1	(Saudi Arabia) Al-Hilal	6	2	3	1	12	7	+5	9	Advance to knockout stage	—	5–0	2–2	1–0
2	(Qatar) Al-Sadd	6	2	2	2	8	14	−6	8	Advance to knockout stage	2–2	—	2–1	3–1
3	(United Arab Emirates) Al-Ahli	6	1	4	1	6	6	0	7		0–0	1–1	—	0–0
4	(Iran) Sepahan	6	2	1	3	9	8	+1	7		3–2	4–0	1–2	—

26 February 2014 1	Al-Sadd (Qatar)	3–1	(Iran) Sepahan	Doha
18:30 UTC+3	Ibrahim 18'; Belhadj 87'; Tabata 90+2'	Report	Sharifi 78'	Stadium: Jassim Bin Hamad Stadium; Attendance: 5,000; Referee: Minoru Tōjō (Japan)

12 March 2014 2	Al-Ahli (United Arab Emirates)	1–1	(Qatar) Al-Sadd	Dubai
20:15 UTC+4	Grafite 68'	Report	Belhadj 24'	Stadium: Al-Rashid Stadium; Attendance: 5,749; Referee: Tan Hai (China PR)

19 March 2014 3	Al-Sadd (Qatar)	2–2	(Saudi Arabia) Al-Hilal	Doha
18:45 UTC+3	Al-Bloushi 26'; Belhadj 66'	Report	Neves 45+1', 56'	Stadium: Jassim Bin Hamad Stadium; Attendance: 7,761; Referee: Kim Sang-woo (South Korea)

1 April 2014 4	Al-Hilal (Saudi Arabia)	5–0	(Qatar) Al-Sadd	Riyadh
20:40 UTC+3	Al-Qahtani 3' (pen.); Al-Deayea 28'; Al-Shamrani 34', 58', 62'	Report		Stadium: King Fahd International Stadium; Attendance: 18,321; Referee: Ryuji Sato (Japan)

15 April 2014 5	Sepahan (Iran)	4–0	(Qatar) Al-Sadd	Fuladshahr
20:30 UTC+4:30	Sharifi 48', 56'; Sukaj 63'; Majid 90+3' (o.g.)	Report		Stadium: Foolad Shahr Stadium; Attendance: 6,350; Referee: Kim Dong-jin (South Korea)

22 April 2014 6	Al-Sadd (Qatar)	2–1	(United Arab Emirates) Al-Ahli	Doha
20:50 UTC+3	Ibrahim 34'; Tabata 79'	Report	Grafite 15'	Stadium: Jassim Bin Hamad Stadium; Attendance: 3,680; Referee: Peter Green (Australia)

=== Knockout stage ===
==== Round of 16 ====
7 May 2014	Al-Sadd (Qatar)	0–0	(Iran) Foolad	Doha
19:00 UTC+3		Report		Stadium: Jassim Bin Hamad Stadium; Attendance: 6,320; Referee: Ryuji Sato (Japan)

14 May 2014	Foolad (Iran)	2–2	(Qatar) Al-Sadd	Ahvaz
19:30 UTC+4:30	Chimba 77' (pen.), 87'	Report	Belhadj 16'; Ibrahim 29'	Stadium: Ghadir Stadium; Attendance: 48,753; Referee: Kim Dong-jin (South Korea)

== Squad information ==
=== Playing statistics ===
No.	Pos	Nat	Player	Total		Qatar Stars League		Emir of Qatar Cup		AFC CL1		Other (Note: Includes the Crown Prince Cup and Sheikh Jassim Cup)	
No.	Pos	Nat	Player	Apps	Goals	Apps	Goals	Apps	Goals	Apps	Goals	Apps	Goals
Goalkeepers
1	GK	(Qatar) QAT	Saad Al Sheeb	24	0	24	0	0	0	0	0	0	0
22	GK	(Qatar) QAT	Muhannad Naim	3	0	3	0	0	0	0	0	0	0
30	GK	(Qatar) QAT	Mohamed Saqr	1	0	1	0	0	0	0	0	0	0
Defenders
2	DF	(Qatar) QAT	Hamid Ismaeil	0	0	0	0	0	0	0	0	0	0
2	DF	(Qatar) QAT	Mesaad Al-Hamad	8	0	8	0	0	0	0	0	0	0
3	DF	(Qatar) QAT	Abdelkarim Hassan	23	2	23	2	0	0	0	0	0	0
4	DF	(Qatar) QAT	Abdulla Al-Berik	0	0	0	0	0	0	0	0	0	0
5	DF	(Qatar) QAT	Almahdi Ali Mukhtar	22	2	22	2	0	0	0	0	0	0
6	DF	(Qatar) QAT	Mohammed Kasola	24	2	24	2	0	0	0	0	0	0
19	DF	(Qatar) QAT	Nasser Nabeel	1	0	1	0	0	0	0	0	0	0
21	DF	(Qatar) QAT	Abdulla Koni	0	0	0	0	0	0	0	0	0	0
26	DF	(Qatar) QAT	Taher Zakaria	12	1	12	1	0	0	0	0	0	0
32	DF	(Qatar) QAT	Ibrahim Majid	3	0	3	0	0	0	0	0	0	0
39	DF	(Algeria) ALG	Nadir Belhadj	26	6	26	6	0	0	0	0	0	0
40	DF	(South Korea) KOR	Lee Jung-Soo	22	2	22	2	0	0	0	0	0	0
Midfielders
8	MF	(Qatar) QAT	Mohammed Al Yazeedi	14	0	14	0	0	0	0	0	0	0
10	MF	(Qatar) QAT	Khalfan Ibrahim	26	14	26	14	0	0	0	0	0	0
12	MF	(Qatar) QAT	Rodrigo Tabata	7	5	7	5	0	0	0	0	0	0
13	MF	(Qatar) QAT	Ali Assadalla	17	2	17	2	0	0	0	0	0	0
15	MF	(Qatar) QAT	Talal Al-Bloushi	16	0	16	0	0	0	0	0	0	0
27	MF	(Qatar) QAT	Jasser Yahya	1	0	1	0	0	0	0	0	0	0
48	MF	(Qatar) QAT	Omar Yahya	0	0	0	0	0	0	0	0	0	0
Forwards
7	FW	(Spain) ESP	Raúl	17	2	17	2	0	0	0	0	0	0
9	FW	(Senegal) SEN	Mamadou Niang	4	1	4	1	0	0	0	0	0	0
11	FW	(Qatar) QAT	Hassan Al Haidos	24	5	24	5	0	0	0	0	0	0
16	FW	(Qatar) QAT	Abdulaziz Al Ansari	3	0	3	0	0	0	0	0	0	0
17	FW	(Qatar) QAT	Saleh Bader Al Yazidi	14	2	14	2	0	0	0	0	0	0
18	FW	(Qatar) QAT	Fahad Saket	0	0	0	0	0	0	0	0	0	0
20	FW	(Qatar) QAT	Yusef Ahmed	13	1	13	1	0	0	0	0	0	0
37	FW	(Qatar) QAT	Hamza Sanhaji	2	0	2	0	0	0	0	0	0	0
Players transferred out during the season
	FW	(Brazil) BRA	Leandro	10	3	10	3	0	0	0	0	0	0

Last updated: 20 November 2017
Source: fr.soccerway.com

=== Goalscorers ===
Includes all competitive matches. The list is sorted alphabetically by surname when total goals are equal.

No.	Nat.	Player	Pos.	QSL	QEC	CPC	SJC	CL 1	TOTAL
10	(Qatar)	Khalfan Ibrahim	MF	14	0	0	0	3	0
39	(Algeria)	Nadir Belhadj	DF	6	0	0	0	4	0
12	(Qatar)	Rodrigo Tabata	MF	5	0	0	0	2	0
11	(Qatar)	Hassan Al Haidos	FW	5	0	0	0	0	0
	(Brazil)	Leandro	FW	3	0	0	0	0	0
7	(Spain)	Raúl	FW	2	1	0	0	0	0
3	(Qatar)	Abdelkarim Hassan	DF	2	0	0	0	0	0
5	(Qatar)	Almahdi Ali Mukhtar	DF	2	0	0	0	0	0
6	(Qatar)	Mohammed Kasola	DF	2	0	0	0	0	0
40	(South Korea)	Lee Jung-Soo	DF	2	0	0	0	0	0
17	(Qatar)	Saleh Bader Al Yazidi	FW	2	0	0	0	0	0
32	(Qatar)	Ibrahim Majid	DF	0	2	0	0	0	0
15	(Qatar)	Talal Al-Bloushi	MF	0	0	0	0	1	0
9	(Senegal)	Mamadou Niang	FW	1	0	0	0	0	0
20	(Qatar)	Yusef Ahmed	FW	1	0	0	0	0	0
Own Goals				3	0	0	0	0	0
Totals				54	7	0	5	10	76

== Transfers ==
=== In ===
Date	Pos	Player	From club	Transfer fee	Source
30 June 2013	MF	(Qatar) Mohammed Al Yazeedi	Al Kharaitiyat	Loan Return	
30 June 2013	FW	(Brazil) Leandro	(Japan) Gamba Osaka	Loan Return	
30 June 2013	FW	(Qatar) Abdulaziz Al Ansari	Al Kharaitiyat	Loan Return	
30 June 2013	GK	(Qatar) Muhannad Naim	(Belgium) Eupen	Loan Return	
30 June 2013	FW	(Senegal) Mamadou Niang	(Turkey) Fenerbahçe	Loan Return	
31 January 2014	MF	(Qatar) Rodrigo Tabata	Al Rayyan	Loan for one year	

=== Out ===
Date	Pos	Player	To club	Transfer fee	Source
16 September 2013	FW	(Iraq) Younis Mahmoud	(Saudi Arabia) Al-Ahli	Free transfer	
9 January 2014	FW	(Brazil) Leandro	(Japan) Kashiwa Reysol	Free transfer	
