= Al-Yazidi =

Al-Yazidi is an Arabic-language surname and a clan within the Yafa'i tribe. It means "the Yazidi" or something related to the name Yazid. Notable people with the name include:

- Abdullah Al-Yazidi (born 2002), Qatari professional footballer
- Saleh Al-Yazidi (born 1993), Qatari-Yemeni professional footballer
- Mohammed Al Yazeedi (born 1988), Qatari-Yemeni professional footballer
- Nasser Al Yazidi (born 2000), Qatari professional footballer
