= JOMO Cup =

Association football all-star game

JOMO Cup was a all-star game between the all-star team of K League and all-star team of J.League.

Japan Energy Corporation whose filling stations are branded as JOMO sponsored this all-star game.

It was held in 2008 and 2009 then ceased.

== Games ==
=== 2008 ===
2 August 2008
UTC+9 18:00

K League All-Star	3–1	J.League All-Star
Choi Sung-kuk 37'; Edu 57', 60'	Report	Tulio 67'

Olympic Stadium, Tokyo
Attendance: 27,629
Referee: Mark Shield

GK	1	(South Korea) Lee Woon-jae		(substituted off) 81'
CB	3	(South Korea) Kim Hyung-il
CB	5	(South Korea) Kim Chi-gon
CB	14	(South Korea) Lee Jung-soo	(yellow card) 87'
DM	2	(South Korea) Choi Hyo-jin
RM	6	(South Korea) Cho Won-hee
LM	4	(South Korea) Kim Chi-woo		(substituted off) 45'
AM	19	(South Korea) Lee Kwan-woo		(substituted off) 68'
RF	10	(Montenegro) Dženan Radončić		(substituted off) 62'
CF	7	(South Korea) Choi Sung-kuk		(substituted off) 73'
LF	11	(Brazil) Dudu		(substituted off) 45'
Substitutes:
GK	18	(South Korea) Kim Young-kwang		(substituted on) 81'
MF	9	(South Korea) Chung Kyung-ho		(substituted on) 46'
MF	16	(South Korea) Lee Dong-sik		(substituted on) 68'
FW	8	(South Korea) Jung Jo-gook		(substituted on) 62'
FW	13	(South Korea) Kim Jin-yong		(substituted on) 73'
FW	15	(Brazil) Edu		(substituted on) 46'	(substituted off) 81'
FW	17	(South Korea) Jang Nam-seok		(substituted on) 81'
Manager:
(South Korea) Cha Bum-kun

GK	1	(Japan) Seigo Narazaki
DF	2	(Japan) Yuji Nakazawa		(substituted off) 69'
DF	4	(Japan) Marcus Tulio Tanaka	(yellow card) 85'
DF	7	(Japan) Toru Araiba
MF	6	(South Korea) Kim Nam-Il		(substituted off) 65'
MF	8	(Japan) Mitsuo Ogasawara	(yellow card) 62'	(substituted off) 75'
MF	10	(Japan) Koji Yamase		(substituted off) 60'
MF	14	(Japan) Kengo Nakamura
MF	15	(Japan) Yūichi Komano		(substituted off) 79'
FW	9	(Norway) Frode Johnsen
FW	16	(North Korea) Jong Tae-se		(substituted off) 72'
Substitutes:
GK	19	(Japan) Ryōta Tsuzuki
DF	3	(Japan) Daiki Iwamasa		(substituted on) 69'
DF	13	(Japan) Yuki Abe		(substituted on) 65'
MF	5	(Japan) Yasuyuki Konno		(substituted on) 79'
MF	11	(Japan) Takahiro Futagawa		(substituted on) 75'
MF	17	(Japan) Mu Kanazaki		(substituted on) 60'
FW	18	(Japan) Seiichiro Maki		(substituted on) 72'
Manager:
(Brazil) Oswaldo de Oliveira

Man of the Match:
(South Korea) Choi Sung-kuk

Assistant referees:
(Japan) Yoshihisa Takahashi
(Japan) Hisashi Nakai

=== 2009 ===
8 August 2009
UTC+9 19:00

K League All-Star	1–4	J.League All-Star
Choi Sung-kuk 82' (pen.)	Report	Marquinhos 14'; Lee Jung-soo 59'; K. Nakamura 72'; Juninho 81'

Incheon Munhak Stadium, Incheon
Attendance: 39,230
Referee: H. Jun Jie

GK	1	(South Korea) Lee Woon-jae		(substituted off) 56'
RB	4	(South Korea) Kim Chang-soo		(substituted off) 46(1)'
CB	3	(South Korea) Kim Hyung-il
CB	5	(China) Li Weifeng
LB	8	(Brazil) Adilson
CM	16	(South Korea) Ki Sung-yueng
CM	14	(South Korea) Kim Jung-woo		(substituted off) 46(2)'
RW	10	(Montenegro) Dejan Damjanović		(substituted off) 46(3)'
AM	11	(South Korea) Choi Tae-uk		(substituted off) 65'
LW	18	(South Korea) Lee Dong-gook		(substituted off) 46(4)'
CF	7	(South Korea) Choi Sung-kuk	(yellow card) 77'
Substitutes:
DF	2	(South Korea) Choi Hyo-jin	(yellow card) 86'	(substituted on) 46(1)'
MF	13	(South Korea) Lee Ho		(substituted on) 46(2)'
FW	9	(Brazil) Edu		(substituted on) 46(3)'
MF	15	(South Korea) Yoo Byung-soo		(substituted on) 46(4)'
GK	19	(South Korea) Kim Young-kwang		(substituted on) 56'
FW	17	(South Korea) Kim Young-hoo		(substituted on) 68'
Manager:
(South Korea) Cha Bum-kun

GK	1	(Japan) Seigo Narazaki	(substituted off) 75'
CB	3	(Japan) Daiki Iwamasa	(substituted off) 83'
CB	17	(Japan) Tomokazu Myojin
CB	6	(South Korea) Lee Jung-soo
RWB	2	(Japan) Atsuto Uchida	(substituted off) 46'
LWB	15	(Brazil) Gilton Ribeiro
CM	7	(Japan) Yasuhito Endō	(substituted off) 59'
CM	14	(Japan) Kengo Nakamura	(substituted off) 81'
CM	8	(Japan) Mitsuo Ogasawara	(substituted off) 67'
CF	10	(Brazil) Juninho
CF	18	(Brazil) Marquinhos	(substituted off) 63'
Substitutes:
DF	5	(Japan) Yūichi Komano	(substituted on) 46'
MF	9	(Japan) Takuya Nozawa	(substituted on) 59'
FW	11	(Japan) Yoshito Ōkubo	(substituted on) 63'
MF	13	(Japan) Yuki Abe	(substituted on) 67'
GK	19	(Japan) Hitoshi Sogahata	(substituted on) 75'
MF	16	(Japan) Hiroyuki Taniguchi	(substituted on) 81'
DF	4	(Japan) Tomoaki Makino	(substituted on) 83'
Manager:
(Brazil) Oswaldo de Oliveira

Man of the Match:
(South Korea) Lee Jung-soo

Assistant referees:
(South Korea) Kim Yong
(South Korea) Son Jae-sun

== Broadcasters ==
- Japan
  - TV Asahi (2008–2009)
- South Korea
  - KBS N Sports (2008)
  - SBS TV (2009)

== See also ==
- K League All-Star Game
- J.League All-Star Soccer
