= Khalid Al Merreikhi =

Qatari footballer (born 1968)

Personal information
- Full name: Khalid Hamad Mohammed Al Merreikhi
- Date of birth: January 1, 1968 (age 58)
- Place of birth: Qatar
- Position: Midfielder

Youth career
- 1982–1986: Al Tadamun

Senior career*
| Years | Team | Apps | (Gls) |
| 1986–1989 | Al Tadamun | | |
| 1989–1994 | Al Sadd | | |

International career
- Qatar
- * Club domestic league appearances and goals

Khalid Al Merreikhi (Arabic:خالد المريخي; born 1968) is a Qatari retired football player. He played for the Qatar national team but is best known for his time with Al Sadd.

He started his career in Al Tadamun. After the temporary dissolution of the Qatari Second Division in 1989, he moved to Al Sadd. Future star Fahad Al Kuwari also made the transition to Al Sadd alongside him. They were both considered the most prominent players to have transferred from the Second Division.

He scored the winning goal in the final of the 1994 Emir Cup final.
