= J.League All-Star Soccer =

JOMO All-Star Soccer
- Founded: 1993; 33 years ago
- Region: J.League (AFC)
- Teams: 2

The J.League All-Star Soccer, called JOMO All-Star Soccer for sponsorship reasons, is an annual exhibition match organised by the Japan Football Association and J.League. It has been played each year since the inception of J.League in 1993. The players are chosen by the fan voting and the recommendation from J.League. The manager and coaches are also selected by the fan voting.

The old Japan Soccer League had an all-star game that was the forerunner to this competition. From 1966 to 1972 it was a two-leg final and from 1979 to 1992 a one-game affair, all pitting a West team against an East team. The last two games, in 1991 and 1992, were of the few football matches that took place at the baseball-specific Tokyo Dome.

The competition is officially titled with its sponsor's name. It was called Kodak All-Star Soccer between 1993 and 1998 as Kodak Japan (the Japanese subsidiary of Eastman Kodak) sponsored it. It was known as Tarami All-Star Soccer from 1999 to 2001 after food company Tarami. It has been titled as JOMO All-Star Soccer since 2002 because Japan Energy Corporation whose filling stations are branded as JOMO sponsor the competition.

== Team selection ==
- All the J.League Division 1 clubs are divided into two teams, J-West and J-East, based on the geographical location of the club's hometown. Because both team should have the same number of clubs, some clubs based in central Japan have been allotted to both teams in the past due to the promotion or relegation of other clubs. The 1995 and 1996 competitions were exceptions, where the clubs were divided based on the result of the previous season. Those finished at an even number of the standing were allotted to J-Altair, and those finished at an odd number to J-Vega (Note: In the Tanabata folk tale, anthropomorphic Vega and Altair are said to see each other once a year across the Milky Way for a romantic reason).
- Each team consists of 16 players as well as 1 manager and 2 coaches. 11 players (1 GK, 3 DFs, 3MFs and 3FWs as well as the most voted 4th-ranked field player) are selected by the fan voting. More than 4 players cannot be selected from any one club. 5 other players are additionally selected by the recommendation from J.League that makes sure that each club has at least one representative in the competition. The fan voting also chooses 1 manager and 2 coaches. The most voted club manager acts as the manager and the 2nd and 3rd most voted club managers serve as coaches.

== Regular Matches ==
Date	Venue	Score	MVP	Note
1993-07-17	Kobe Universiade Memorial	J-EAST: 2 J-WEST: 1	(Japan) Kazuyoshi Miura (V. Kawasaki)	
1994-07-23	Hiroshima Big Arch	J-EAST: 1 J-WEST: 2	(Japan) Akihiro Nagashima (Shimizu)	
1995-07-22	National Olympic Stadium	J-Vega: 4 J-Altair: 0	(Japan) Shoji Jo (Ichihara)	
1996-07-06	Nagai Stadium	J-Vega: 2 (PK 4); J-Altair: 2 (PK 3)	(Federal Republic of Yugoslavia) Dragan Stojković (Nagoya)	
1997-07-27	Kobe Universiade Memorial	J-EAST: 1 J-WEST: 4	(Cameroon) Patrick Mboma (G. Osaka)	
1998-08-16	International Stadium Yokohama	J-EAST: 1 J-WEST: 3	(Federal Republic of Yugoslavia) Dragan Stojković (Nagoya)	
1999-07-31	Nagai Stadium	J-EAST: 2 J-WEST: 3	(Japan) Hiroaki Morishima (C. Osaka)	
2000-08-26	Miyagi Stadium	J-EAST: 2 J-WEST: 5	(Federal Republic of Yugoslavia) Dragan Stojković (Nagoya)	
2001-08-04	Toyota Stadium	J-EAST: 4 J-WEST: 3	(Japan) Atsushi Yanagisawa (Kashima)	
2002-08-24	Saitama Stadium	J-EAST: 2 J-WEST: 1	(Brazil) Emerson (Urawa)	
2003-08-09	Sapporo Dome	J-EAST: 3 J-WEST: 1	(Cameroon) Patrick Mboma (Tokyo V.)	
2004-07-03	Niigata Stadium	J-EAST: 3 J-WEST: 3	(Japan) Naohiro Ishikawa (F.C. Tokyo)	
2005-10-09	Ōita Stadium	J-EAST: 2 J-WEST: 3	(Brazil) Magno Alves (Oita)	
2006-07-15	Kashima Soccer Stadium	J-EAST: 4 J-WEST: 1	(Japan) Yuji Nakazawa (Yokohama FM)	
2007-08-04	Ecopa Stadium	J-EAST: 2 J-WEST: 3	(Japan) Yoshito Okubo (C. Osaka)	

== JOMO Cup J.League All Stars vs K League All Stars Matches ==
Date	Venue	Score	MVP	Note
2008-08-02	Tokyo National Stadium	J.League: 1 K League: 3	(South Korea) Choi Sung-Kuk (Seongnam Ilhwa Chunma)	JOMO Cup; *J.League All Stars v. K League All Stars
2009-08-08	(South Korea) Incheon Munhak Stadium	K League: 1 J.League: 4	(South Korea) Lee Jung-Soo (Kyoto Sanga F.C.)	JOMO Cup; K League All Stars v. *J.League All Stars

== JOMO Cup J.League Dream Matches ==
J.League All-Star Soccer should not be confused with another exhibition match JOMO Cup J.League Dream Match. The latter was held once a year between 1995 and 2001 and was competed between Japanese J.League players (in the case of the 1997 and 2000 competitions, the Japan National Team) and non-Japanese J.League players.

Results

Date	Score	Venue	Note
1995-10-10	Japan Dream: 3 World Dream:1	National Olympic Stadium	-
1996-10-10	Japan Dream: 1 World Dream: 2	National Olympic Stadium	-
1997-08-28	Japan National Team: 0 World Dream: 0	Urawa Komaba Stadium	The competition was held as a 'sending-off' match for the Japan National Football Team who would participate in the final qualifying stage of 1998 FIFA World Cup.
1998-10-10	Japan Dream: 3 World Dream: 1	National Olympic Stadium	Guest player for World Dream team: (Paraguay) José Luis Chilavert
1999-10-11	Japan Dream: 1 World Dream: 3	National Olympic Stadium	Guest players for the World Dream Team: (Brazil) Leonardo Araújo and (Italy) Roberto Baggio
2000-10-04	Japan National Team: 2 World Dream: 0	National Olympic Stadium	The competition was held as a 'sending-off' match for the Japan National Football Team who would participate in the AFC Asian Cup. Guest player for the World Dream Team: (Italy) Roberto Baggio
2001-09-02	Japan Dream: 2 World Dream: 4	National Olympic Stadium	Guest player for the Rest of the World team: (Cameroon) Patrick Mboma

== Special Charity Matches ==
- Tōhoku earthquake Charity Match

2011-03-29	Japan	2 – 1	(Japan) J.League Team As One	Osaka, Japan
19:26 JST	Yasuhito Endō 15'; Shinji Okazaki 19'	(JFA Report)	Kazuyoshi Miura 82'	Stadium: Nagai Stadium; Attendance: 40,613; Referee: Yuichi Nishimura (Japan)

Date	Team	Score	Team	Stadium	Attendance
2012-07-21	J.League Team AS One	4 - 0	J.League XI	Kashima Soccer Stadium	23,760
2013-06-16	J.League Team AS One	2 - 1	J.League XI	National Stadium	41,246

== See also ==
- JOMO Cup
- K League All-Star Game
- Charity Match to Support the Recovery from the 2011 earthquake off the Pacific coast of Tōhoku. Ganbarou Nippon!
- Great East Japan Earthquake Reconstruction Support J.League Special Match
