= 2001 Arab Club Champions Cup =

بطولة الأندية العربية لأبطال الدوري 2001

Tournament details
- Host country: Qatar
- City: Doha
- Teams: 10 (from 1 association)
- Venue: 1 (in 1 host city)

Final positions
- Champions: (Qatar) Al Sadd SC (1st title)
- Runners-up: (Algeria) MC Oran

Tournament statistics
- Matches played: 15
- Goals scored: 53 (3.53 per match)
- Top scorer: (Morocco) Bouchaib El Moubarki (6 goals)
- Best player: (Iran) Karim Bagheri
- Best goalkeeper: (Qatar) Ahmed Khalil
- Fair play award: (Yemen) Al-Ahli Sana'a

The 2001 Arab Club Champions Cup edition, called Prince Faisal bin Fahd Cup, was won by Qatari side Al Sadd SC, the hosts. It was the 17th tournament and was held from 28 November to 12 December 2001.

== Participants ==
Participants
Zone	Team	Qualifying method
	(Qatar) Al-Sadd	Hosts
	(Tunisia) CS Sfaxien	Holders
Zone 1	(Qatar) Al-Rayyan SC	Replaced Al-Ain FC
Zone 2	(Saudi Arabia) Al-Ahli Jeddah	1999–2000 Saudi Premier League runners-up
Zone 2	(Yemen) Al-Ahli Sana'a	1999–2000 Yemeni League winners
Zone 3	(Algeria) MC Oran	1999–2000 Algerian Championship runners-up
Zone 4	(Jordan) Al-Faisaly	2000 Jordan League winners
Zone 4	(Syria) Hutteen	1999–2000 Syrian League runners-up

== Preliminary stage ==
=== Zone 1 (Gulf Area) ===
Qualification from GCC Champions League held in Al Ain on 2001.

Team	Pld	W	D	L	GF	GA	GD	Pts
(United Arab Emirates) Al-Ain	5	4	0	1	6	4	+2	12
(Saudi Arabia) Al-Ittihad Jeddah	5	3	1	1	10	1	+9	10
(Oman) Dhofar	5	3	1	1	6	3	+3	10
(Kuwait) Al-Salmiya	5	1	2	2	5	6	−1	5
(Qatar) Al-Ittihad Doha	5	1	1	3	6	7	−1	4
(Bahrain) West Riffa	5	0	1	4	5	17	−12	1

3 January 2001

Al-Ain (United Arab Emirates)	2–1	(Bahrain) West Riffa
Khater 53'		Darwish 82'

Al Ain
4 January 2001

Al-Ittihad Jeddah (Saudi Arabia)	0–1	(Kuwait) Al-Salmiya
		Al-Huwaidi 29'

Al Ain
4 January 2001

Dhofar (Oman)	2–0	(Qatar) Al-Ittihad Doha
Al-Katheeri 79'; Al-Dhabit 91' (pen.)

Al Ain

6 January 2001

Al-Ain (United Arab Emirates)	2–1	(Kuwait) Al-Salmiya
Khater 47'; Al-Kuwaiti 70'		Al-Huwaidi 90+5'

Al Ain
6 January 2001

West Riffa (Bahrain)	1–4	(Qatar) Al-Ittihad Doha
Humaida 71'		Al-Kaabi 11'; Al-Mazroa 53', 90+2'; Massoud 57' (o.g.)

Al Ain
7 January 2001

Al-Ittihad Jeddah (Saudi Arabia)	0–0	(Oman) Dhofar

Al Ain

8 January 2001

Al-Ain (United Arab Emirates)	1–0	(Qatar) Al-Ittihad Doha
Al-Kuwaiti 70'

Al Ain
9 January 2001

Al-Salmiya (Kuwait)	1–0	(Oman) Dhofar
Baalawi 34'

Al Ain
9 January 2001

West Riffa (Bahrain)	0–7	(Saudi Arabia) Al-Ittihad Jeddah
		Al-Yami 5', 33', 63' (pen.), 67'; Al-Otaibi 19', 90+2'; Al-Saqri 38'

Al Ain

11 January 2001

Al-Salmiya (Kuwait)	1–1	(Bahrain) West Riffa
Abdullah 51' (pen.)		Massoud 88' (pen.)

Al Ain
11 January 2001

Al-Ittihad Doha (Qatar)	0–1	(Saudi Arabia) Al-Ittihad Jeddah
		Omar 90+3'

Al Ain
12 January 2001

Al-Ain (United Arab Emirates)	1–0	(Oman) Dhofar
Ali 9'

Al Ain

13 January 2001

Al-Ittihad Doha (Qatar)	2–2	(Kuwait) Al-Ittihad Jeddah
Al-Mazroa 5' (pen.); Adam 74'		Al-Huwaidi 45' (pen.), 62'

Al Ain
14 January 2001

Dhofar (Oman)	3–2	(Bahrain) West Riffa
Al-Hedhari (?); ? (?); Al-Kathiri 84'		Humaida 79'; Taleb 90+3'

Al Ain
14 January 2001

Al-Ain (United Arab Emirates)	0–2	(Saudi Arabia) Al-Ittihad Jeddah
		Al-Yami 23', 78'

Al Ain

Al-Ain qualified but withdrew the tournament, Al-Rayyan replaced it

=== Zone 2 (Red Sea) ===
The qualifying tournament took place in Jeddah.

Team	Pld	W	D	L	GF	GA	GD	Pts
(Saudi Arabia) Al-Ahli Jeddah	0	0	0	0	0	0	0	0
(Yemen) Al-Ahli Sana'a'	0	0	0	0	0	0	0	0
(Sudan) Al-Merrikh	0	0	0	0	0	0	0	0

20 May 2001

Al-Ahli Jeddah (Saudi Arabia)	1–0	(Sudan) Al-Merrikh
Al-Jahani 15'

Prince Abdullah Al Faisal Stadium, Jeddah

22 May 2001

Al-Merrikh (Sudan)	2–2	(Yemen) Al-Ahli Sana'a'
Goal		Al-Hemy 75'; Abdullah 77'

Prince Abdullah Al Faisal Stadium, Jeddah

24 May 2001

Al-Ahli Jeddah (Saudi Arabia)	2–1	(Yemen) Al-Ahli Sana'a'
Valle 28', 84'		Al-Salemy 24' (pen.)

Prince Abdullah Al Faisal Stadium, Jeddah

Al-Ahli Jeddah and Al-Ahli Sana'a' advanced to the final tournament.

=== Zone 3 (North Africa) ===
First round

Team 1	Agg.	Team 2	1st leg	2nd leg
MAS Fez (Morocco)	4–4	(Libya) Al-Ahli Tripoli	4–2	0–2
ASC Mauritel (Mauritania)	–	(Algeria) MC Oran	–	–

2001

MAS Fez (Morocco)	4-2	(Libya) Al-Ahli Tripoli
Chkilit; Kissi; * Hassi		Al-Shibli; Gaddafi

Stade Hassan II, Fes
2001

Al-Ahli Tripoli (Libya)	2–0	(Morocco) MAS Fez
Moammar; Al-Idrissi

Tripoli Stadium, Tripoli

Second round

Team 1	Agg.	Team 2	1st leg	2nd leg
Al-Ahli Tripoli (Libya)	w/o	(Algeria) MC Oran	—	—

MC Oran advanced to the final tournament.

=== Zone 4 (East Region) ===
The qualifying tournament took place in Amman. Nejmeh was disqualified from the qualifying tournament because the fifa has frozen the activity of the Lebanese Football Association.

Team	Pld	W	D	L	GF	GA	GD	Pts
(Jordan) Al-Faisaly	2	2	0	0	6	0	+6	6
(Syria) Hutteen	2	1	0	1	6	2	+4	3
(Palestine) Hilal Al-Quds	2	0	0	2	2	11	−9	0
(Lebanon) Nejmeh (D)	0	0	0	0	0	0	0	0

(D) Disqualified
... July 2001

Al-Faisaly (Jordan)	5–0	(Palestine) Hilal Al-Quds

Amman International Stadium, Amman

... July 2001

Hutteen (Syria)	6–2	(Palestine) Hilal Al-Quds

Amman International Stadium, Amman

26 July 2001

Al-Faisaly (Jordan)	1–0	(Syria) Hutteen
		Al-Hasnat 31'

Amman International Stadium, Amman
Referee: Mohamed Risha (Egypt)

Al-Faisaly and Hutteen advanced to the final tournament.

== Final tournament ==
=== Venues ===
Doha	Doha is located in Qatar
Jassim Bin Hamad Stadium	Doha is located in Qatar
Capacity: 18,000	Doha is located in Qatar

=== Group stage ===
The eight teams were drawn into two groups of four. Each group was played on one leg basis. The winners and runners-up of each group advanced to the semi-finals.

==== Group A ====
Team	Pld	W	D	L	GF	GA	GD	Pts
(Qatar) Al Sadd SC	3	2	0	1	14	3	+11	6
(Algeria) MC Oran	3	2	0	1	5	7	−2	6
(Yemen) Al-Ahli Sana'a	3	1	1	1	3	5	−2	4
(Syria) Hutteen SC	3	0	1	2	2	9	−7	1

28 November 2001

Al-Ahli Sana'a (Yemen)	2–1	(Qatar) Al Sadd SC
Ahmed 67', 76'		Bagheri 90'

Jassim Bin Hamad Stadium, Doha
28 November 2001

Hutteen SC (Syria)	0–2	(Algeria) MC Oran
		Zerrouki 7'; El-Aouni 52'

Jassim Bin Hamad Stadium, Doha

30 November 2001

Al-Ahli Sana'a (Yemen)	0–3	(Algeria) MC Oran
		Benzerga 28'; El-Aouni 42', 58'

Jassim Bin Hamad Stadium, Doha
30 November 2001

Hutteen SC (Syria)	1–6	(Qatar) Al Sadd SC
Jablawi 35'		Bagheri 10', 45'; Mahmood 25'; El Moubarki 28'; Utaka 39'; J. Al-Kuwari 79'

Jassim Bin Hamad Stadium, Doha

3 December 2001

Al-Ahli Sana'a (Yemen)	1–1	(Syria) Hutteen SC
Al-Barek 85'		Shuman 90+2'

Jassim Bin Hamad Stadium, Doha
3 December 2001

MC Oran (Algeria)	0–7	(Qatar) Al Sadd SC
		Khalifa 12'; El Moubarki 28', 32', 73'; Utaka 44'; F. Al-Kuwari 89'; Bagheri 90+3'

Jassim Bin Hamad Stadium, Doha

==== Group B ====
Al-Faisaly SC withdrew from the tournament after the first match after contesting the referee falsely, the result was annulled.
Al Rayyan SC replaced Al Ain SC who withdrew from the tournament.

Team	Pld	W	D	L	GF	GA	GD	Pts
(Saudi Arabia) Al-Ahli SC	2	1	1	0	7	2	+5	4
(Qatar) Al Rayyan SC	2	1	0	1	5	6	−1	3
(Tunisia) CS Sfaxien	2	0	1	1	3	7	−4	1
(Jordan) Al-Faisaly SC	0	0	0	0	0	0	0	0

29 September 2001

Al Rayyan SC (Qatar)	0–5	(Saudi Arabia) Al-Ahli SC
		Gahwji 8', 87'; Al-Dosari 10'; Al-Shahri 56'; Suwayed 89' (pen.)

Jassim Bin Hamad Stadium, Doha
29 September 2001

CS Sfaxien (Tunisia)	2–2	(Jordan) Al-Faisaly SC
Ben Younes 43'; Ben Khaled 81'		Salim 7'; Al-Sheikh 74'

Jassim Bin Hamad Stadium, Doha
Referee: Abdullah Salem (Libya)

1 December 2001

CS Sfaxien (Tunisia)	2–2	(Saudi Arabia) Al-Ahli SC
N'Diaye 53'; Ben Younes 80' (pen.)		Fallatah 3'; Al-Gizani 13'

Jassim Bin Hamad Stadium, Doha

4 December 2001

Al Rayyan SC (Qatar)	5–1	(Tunisia) CS Sfaxien
B. Abdullah 6', 81', 90'; Al-Huwaidi 9', 46'		Trabelsi 67'

Jassim Bin Hamad Stadium, Doha

=== Knock-out stage ===
Semi-finals
7 December 2001 – Doha
(Qatar) Al Sadd SC	5
(Qatar) Al Rayyan SC	1
7 December 2001 – Doha
(Saudi Arabia) Al-Ahli SC	2 (3)
(Algeria) MC Oran (p)	2 (5)

Final
10 December 2001 – Doha
(Qatar) Al Sadd SC	3
(Algeria) MC Oran	1

==== Semifinals ====
7 December 2001

Al Sadd SC (Qatar)	5–1	(Qatar) Al Rayyan SC
El Moubarki 14', 18'; Bagheri 43' (pen.); Khalifa 52'; F. Al-Kuwari 52'		B. Abdullah 59'

Jassim Bin Hamad Stadium, Doha

7 December 2001

Al-Ahli SC (Saudi Arabia)	2–2 (a.e.t.)	(Algeria) MC Oran
Gahwji 29'; Al-Khazami 77'		B. Daoud 5'; Haddou 58'
Penalties
Al-Dosari (penalty scored); Al-Khazami (penalty scored); Al-Shehri (penalty scored); Al-Zahrani (penalty missed)	3–5	(penalty scored) Haddou; (penalty scored) Gaïd; (penalty scored) Laouni; (penalty scored) Zerrouki; (penalty scored) Acimi

Jassim Bin Hamad Stadium, Doha
Referee: Gamal Al-Ghandour (Egypt)

==== Final ====
10 December 2001

Al Sadd SC (Qatar)	3–1	(Algeria) MC Oran
Khalifa 25', 53'; Utaka 82'		Haddou 61' (pen.)

Jassim Bin Hamad Stadium, Doha
Attendance: 20,000
Referee: Mahmoud Abbas (Syria)

== Winners ==
2001 Arab Club Champions Cup
(Qatar)
Al Sadd SC
First title
