= Omar Yahya =

Qatari footballer (born 1992)

Personal information
- Full name: Omar Yahya Ahmed Rabah
- Date of birth: 20 June 1992 (age 34)
- Place of birth: Qatar
- Position: Left back

Youth career
- Al Sadd

Senior career*
Years	Team	Apps	(Gls)
2012–2016	Al-Sadd	3	(0)
2016–2025	Umm Salal	137	(1)
2025–2026	Al-Sailiya	12	(0)
- * Club domestic league appearances and goals

Omar Yahya (Arabic: عمر يحيى; born 20 June 1992) is a Qatari footballer. He currently plays as a left back.
