= Saleh Al-Yazidi =

Qatari footballer (born 1993)

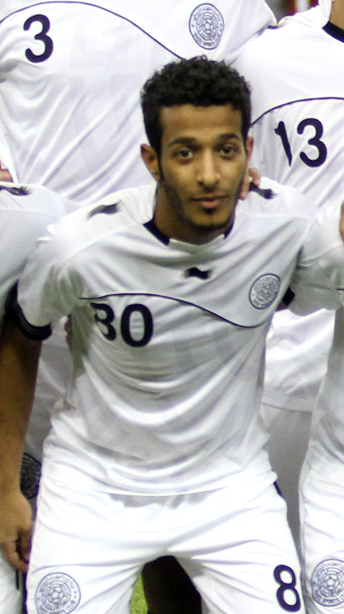
- Al Yazidi in an Al Sadd line-up in 2012

Personal information
- Full name: Saleh Badr Abdulrab Al-Yazidi Al Yafei
- Date of birth: 10 February 1993 (age 33)
- Place of birth: Lower Yafa, Yemen
- Height: 1.66 m (5 ft 5 in)
- Positions: Midfielder; winger

Youth career
- –2008: Al Muaither
- 2008–2010: Aspire Academy
- 2009–2011: Al Sadd

Senior career*
Years	Team	Apps	(Gls)
2010–2018	Al Sadd	34	(2)
2016	→ Umm Salal (loan)	3	(0)
2016–2017	→ Al-Khor (loan)	5	(0)
2017–2018	→ Al-Markhiya (loan)	21	(1)
2018–2019	Al-Sailiya	0	(0)
2019–2020	Al-Shamal		
2020	Al-Markhiya		
2020–	Al-Bidda		
2021–2023	Al Ahli	23	(0)
2023–2024	Al-Sailiya	10	(0)
2024–2026	Lusail	14	(1)

International career
2011	Qatar U20	9	(6)
2012	Qatar U23	4	(1)
- * Club domestic league appearances and goals

Saleh Badr Al-Yazidi (Arabic: صَالِح بَدْر الْيَزِيدِيّ; born February 10, 1993) is a football player who plays as a midfielder. Born in Yemen, he has represented Qatar at youth level. His family is descended from the sheikhdom ruled by the Yazidi tribe in Lower Yafa, a historic state in what was then known as the British Aden Protectorate (present-day Yemen). He played football for a team in Yemen in his youth years, and was later a student at the acclaimed Aspire Academy in Qatar. He gained Qatari citizenship in July 2011. His family still lives in Yafa.

== Club career ==
Yazidi previously played for Al Muaither's youth teams. He later joined Aspire Academy, before becoming a part of Al Sadd's youth team, where he won the top scorer title for the U-19 league with 14 goals in 2011. He graduated from Aspire Academy in 2010.

He made his first-team debut for Al Sadd in 2010.

== International career ==
=== U-20 team ===
Yazidi made his debut for the national youth team in August 2011, against Japan. He featured in the 2012 AFC U-19 Championship qualification campaign for the Qatar under–20 team. He scored 3 goals in the 5 matches Qatar played, including a brace against Bahrain. Qatar finished at the top of their group, ending the qualification with a loss against Tajikistan.

Yazidi also played one game in the 10th International Friendship Youth Tournament, which Qatar came runners-up in, scoring a goal.

He participated in the ASPIRE U–19 tournament in which Qatar won. He played all 3 games and scored a brace against Tunisia.

=== U-23 team ===
Yazidi made his U–23 debut in the 2012 Summer Olympic Qualifiers. His first appearance was on 5 February 2012 against Oman, in a dramatic match which ended 2–2. Shortly after, he featured in a match against Saudi Arabia, which Qatar won 2–1, thanks to an assist Yazidi provided to Hassan Al Haidos two minutes before half-time.

In the qualifying campaign for the 2014 AFC U-22 Asian Cup, he participated in a warm-up game against the UAE. He also came on as a substitute in their first group stage game against Maldives in the 60th minute, scoring a goal 17 minutes later in the 77th minute in order to give Qatar 2–0 win.

== Honours ==
Al Sadd SC

- Qatar Stars League: 2012-13
- Emir of Qatar Cup: 2014, 2015
- Sheikh Jassim Cup: 2014

Individual

- Qatar Youth League Top Scorer: 2011

== Personal ==
He is a distant relative of Mohammed Al Yazidi, who also played for Al Sadd.
