= Ali Sanad =

Qatari footballer (born 1986)

Personal information
- Full name: Ali Sanad Al Nuaimi
- Date of birth: October 31, 1985 (age 41)
- Place of birth: Qatar
- Height: 1.74 m (5 ft 9 in)
- Position: Left back

Senior career*
Years	Team	Apps	(Gls)
2006–2010	Al Sadd	32	(4)
2008–2009	→Al Khor (Loan)		
2010–2011	Al Khor		
2011–2012	Al-Arabi	?	(?)
2012–2017	El Jaish	11	(0)
2017–2019	Al-Rayyan		

International career^{‡}
2006–	Qatar	?	(?)
- * Club domestic league appearances and goals as of 3 April 2013 ‡ National team caps and goals as of 10 December 2006

Ali Sanad (born 31 October 1986) is a Qatari footballer who is a defender. He is a member of the Qatar national football team.

== Notes ==
- Official Al Sadd Sports Club website
- -Annabi
