= John Utaka =

Nigerian footballer (born 1982)

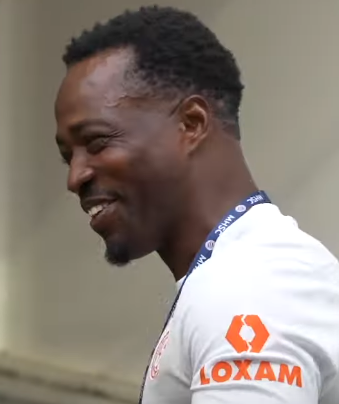
- Utaka in 2024

Personal information
- Full name: John Chukwudi Utaka
- Date of birth: 8 January 1982 (age 44)
- Place of birth: Enugu, Nigeria
- Height: 1.79 m (5 ft 10 in)
- Positions: Striker; winger

Senior career*
Years	Team	Apps	(Gls)
1997–1998	Enugu Rangers	6	(2)
1998–1999	El Mokawloon	25	(5)
1999–2001	Ismaily	42	(30)
2001–2002	Al-Sadd	27	(14)
2002–2005	Lens	102	(24)
2005–2007	Rennes	63	(22)
2007–2011	Portsmouth	90	(10)
2011–2013	Montpellier	68	(12)
2013–2016	Sivasspor	47	(12)
2016	Ismaily	0	(0)
2016-2017	Nogoom El Mostakbal	0	(0)
2017-2017	Aswan	12	(2)
2017–2018	Sedan	14	(0)
Total		496	(133)

International career
2001–2012	Nigeria	48	(6)
- * Club domestic league appearances and goals

John Chukwudi Utaka (born 8 January 1982) is a Nigerian former professional footballer who played as a striker and is currently a youth coach at Montpellier. He is the older brother of fellow professional footballer Peter Utaka.

Utaka has played for several clubs across three continents, first for Arab Contractors, subsequently Ismaily of Egypt, and then spending a season playing for Al-Sadd of Qatar, before joining RC Lens and later Rennes in France. He has represented Nigeria at two World Cups and three Africa Cup of Nations since his debut in 2002.

During his career he has mainly been utilised as a pacy winger making him a very effective element in a team's counter-attacking style of play. He is the founder of the John Utaka Football Academy Minna, Niger state.

== Early life ==
John Chukwudi Utaka was born on 8 January 1982 in Enugu, Nigeria.

== Club career ==
Utaka first moved to Egypt in 1998, joining Arab Contractors and subsequently Ismaily. While with Ismaily, Utaka earned cult status with the local fans. They used to chant "Oh Oh Oh Utaka, Oh Oh Oh Utaka" during the matches. He played alongside the likes of Mohammed Barakat, Islam El-Shater, and captain Mohamed Salah Abo Greisha under the guidance of Mohsen Saleh, later appointed coach of Egypt.

He joined Al-Sadd of Qatar in 2001 for a fee of $1 million. This was then a record transfer fee in Qatar, where he spent one season.

In 2002, he joined French club RC Lens whom he left in 2005 for Rennes.

Utaka struggled to make an impact at the start of his Rennes stint. However, he took advantage of the absence of fellow striker Alexander Frei through injury to make his breakthrough. In February 2006, he scored two consecutive hat-tricks, against Lens and Lyon, and as a result received L'Équipe's player of the month award.

=== Portsmouth ===
Utaka joined Portsmouth on a four-year deal in July 2007, for a fee of around £7 million. He scored his first goal on 11 August 2007 in a game against newly promoted Derby County. Some sources claim he became the club's record signing.

On 17 May 2008, Portsmouth won the FA Cup with a 1–0 victory over Cardiff City. Utaka provided the cross for the winning goal which was scored by Nwankwo Kanu.

He went on to have a poor 2008–09 season but on 27 June 2009 he confirmed he would be staying at the club for at least another season.

The salary being paid to Utaka became a talking point in light of Portsmouth's financial issues, with news agencies reporting an alleged £80,000 per week salary for Utaka as a reflection of their financial mismanagement. Utaka hit out at these reports, claiming that he earned only a third of that figure.

On 23 January 2010, he scored both goals in Portsmouth's 2–1 win over Sunderland in the FA Cup Fourth Round.

=== Montpellier ===
On 29 January 2011, Utaka signed for French first division side Montpellier, agreeing a two-and-a-half year deal for an undisclosed fee. He made his debut for the new club on 26 February coming on as a 70th-minute substitute for Olivier Giroud in a 0–0 draw with Sochaux.

Utaka scored his first goal of the new Ligue 1 season, and his first for the club, against Ajaccio on 21 September 2011, and also provided an assist as Montpellier defeated Ajaccio 3–1 in Corsica. On 19 February 2012, Montpellier travelled to the Parc des Princes to face league leaders PSG; he headed in an 81st-minute goal from a Giroud cross but a late tap in from Guillaume Hoarau levelled the game at 2–2 and earned the sides a share of the points. Montpellier played host to Bordeaux six days later and he headed home the only goal of the game in the 80th minute to keep up the pressure on league leaders PSG. On 20 May 2012, in a game marred by stoppages for crowd violence, Utaka scored a brace, his sixth and seventh league goals of the campaign, to secure a 2–1 victory over Auxerre and win the Ligue 1 title for Montpellier over PSG, for the first time in the club's history.

=== Sivasspor ===
On 1 August 2013, Utaka joined the Turkish club Sivasspor on a two-year contract.

=== CS Sedan ===
In July 2017, he signed with fourth-tier side CS Sedan.

== International career ==
Utaka played for the Nigeria national team until 2014 and was a participant at the 2002 World Cup. He started four of Nigeria's six games in the 2006 African Cup of Nations, in which Nigeria finished in third place. He was also part of the Nigeria squad that participated in the 2010 World Cup.

== Career statistics ==
=== International ===
Appearances and goals by national team and year
National team	Year	Apps	Goals
Nigeria	2001	3	0
Nigeria	2002	4	0
Nigeria	2003	5	1
Nigeria	2004	12	3
Nigeria	2005	2	1
Nigeria	2006	4	0
Nigeria	2007	6	1
Nigeria	2008	7	0
Nigeria	2009	2	0
Nigeria	2010	2	0
Nigeria	2012	2	0
Total		49	6

Scores and results list Nigeria's goal tally first, score column indicates score after each Utaka goal.

List of international goals scored by John Utaka
No.	Date	Venue	Opponent	Score	Result	Competition	Ref.
1	29 March 2003	Kamuzu Stadium, Blantyre, Malawi	Malawi	1-0	1-0	2004 African Cup of Nations qualification	
2	4 February 2002	Taieb Mhiri Stadium, Sfax, Tunisia	Benin	2-0	2-1	2004 African Cup of Nations	
3	8 February 2004	Mustapha Ben Jannet Stadium, Monastir, Tunisia	Cameroon	2-1	2-1	2004 African Cup of Nations	
4	31 May 2004	The Valley, London, England	Jamaica	1-0	2-0	Friendly	
5	4 September 2005	Ahmed Zabana Stadium, Oran, Algeria	Algeria	2-0	5-2	2006 FIFA World Cup qualification	
6	2 June 2007	Mandela National Stadium, Kira Town, Uganda	Uganda	1-0	1-2	2008 Africa Cup of Nations qualification	

== Honours ==
Ismaily SC

- Egypt Cup: 1999–2000

Al Sadd SC

- Arab Club Champions Cup: 2001

Portsmouth

- FA Cup: 2007–08; runner-up: 2009–10

Montpellier

- Ligue 1: 2011–12

Nigeria

- Africa Cup of Nations third place:2004

Individual

- Egyptian Premier League top scorer: 1999–2000
