= Abdulla Koni =

Qatari footballer (born 1979)

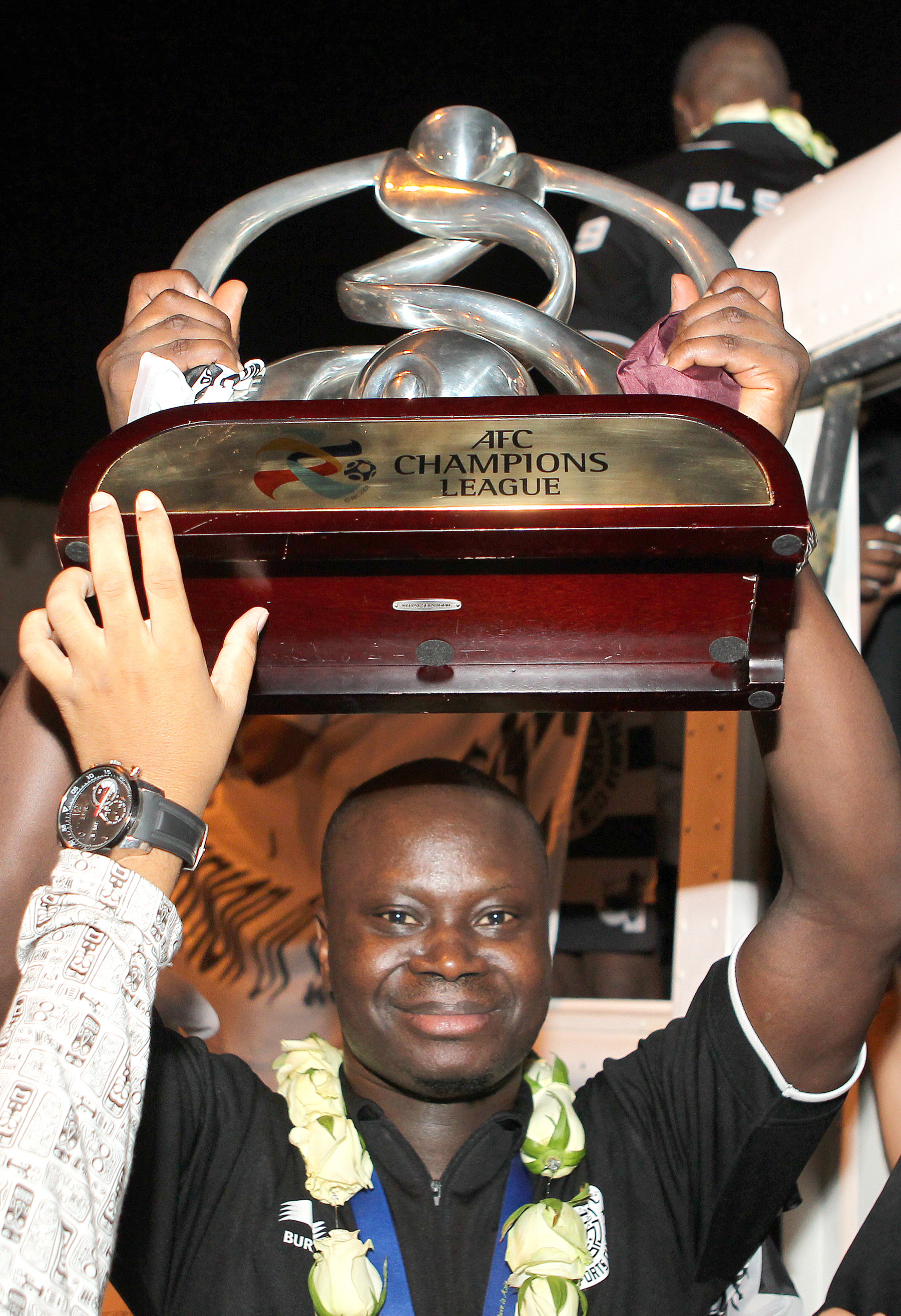
- Koni in 2011

Personal information
- Full name: Abdulla Obaid Koni
- Date of birth: 19 July 1979 (age 47)
- Place of birth: Dakar, Senegal
- Height: 1.85 m (6 ft 1 in)
- Position: Defender

Youth career
- 1990–1996: Al Sadd

Senior career*
Years	Team	Apps	(Gls)
1996–2014	Al Sadd	222	(15)

International career
1998–1999	Qatar U20	3	(0)
1997–2012	Qatar	63	(4)
- * Club domestic league appearances and goals

Abdulla Obaid Koni (Arabic: عبد الله كوني; born on 19 July 1979) is a former professional footballer who played as a defender for Al Sadd. Born in Senegal, he represented the Qatar national team.

== Career ==
Koni was born in Senegal. He captained Al Sadd to victory in the AFC Champions League in 2011. In the round of 16 of the tournament, he scored a decisive header against Al Shabab which turned out to be the winner. His team went on to win the tournament, defeating Jeonbuk Hyundai Motors in the final in South Korea. As a result of the AFC Champions League triumph, he led his team into the 2011 FIFA Club World Cup. In the quarter-finals, he scored the winning goal against Espérance de Tunis slotting in a cross from teammate Lee Jung-Soo, earning his team a 2–1 victory. This set up a semi-final confrontation against Barcelona on 15 December 2011.

With Barcelona leading 1–0 in the 36th minute, Barcelona forward David Villa timed a run well and allowed for a ball to be played over the top into the path of his run. Villa and Koni raced toward the Al Sadd net. As the ball hit the ground, Villa failed to corral the ball, allowing Koni the time to catch up and challenge for the ball on its next bounce. He made a shoulder challenge on Villa as he attempted to strike the ball, causing Villa to fall awkwardly on his left leg and break it. Because of this, Koni was dubbed as "maybe the most influential player of the Euro 2012", even though Spain went on to win the tournament without Villa.

== Career statistics ==
=== International goals ===
Scores and results list Qatar's goal tally first, score column indicates score after each Koni goal.

List of international goals scored by Abdulla Koni
No.	Date	Venue	Opponent	Score	Result	Competition	Ref.
1	29 November 2003	Jalan Besar Stadium, Singapore	Singapore	1–0	2–0	2004 Asian Cup qual.	
2	8 January 2004	Al-Sadaqua Walsalam Stadium, Kuwait City, Kuwait	Kuwait	1–1	2–1	16th Arabian Gulf Cup	
3	1 December 2004		Lebanon	4–0	4–1	Friendly match	
4	16 November 2007	Thani bin Jassim Stadium, Al Rayyan, Qatar	Georgia	1–1	1–2	Friendly match	

== Honours ==
=== Club ===
Al Sadd

- FIFA Club World Cup bronze medalist: 2011
- AFC Champions League: 2011
- Arab Champions League: 2001
- Qatari League: 1999–2000, 2003–04, 2005–06, 2006–07, 2012–13
- Emir of Qatar Cup: 2000, 2001, 2003, 2005, 2007
- Qatar Crown Prince Cup: 1998, 2003, 2006, 2007, 2008
- Sheikh Jassem Cup: 1998, 2000, 2002, 2007
- Qatari Stars Cup: 2010-11
