= Ali Nasser =

Qatari footballer (born 1986)

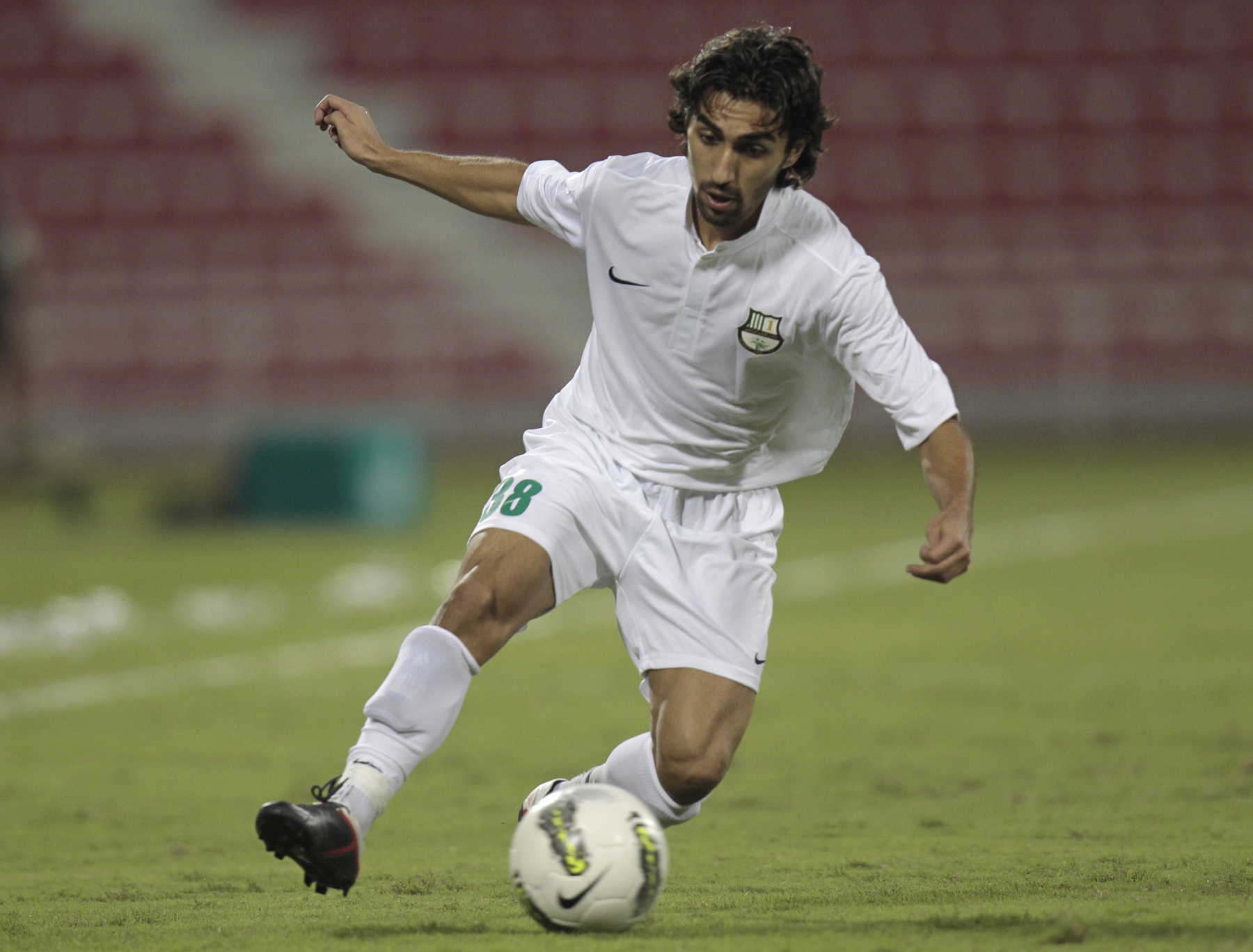
- Ali Nasser in 2011

Personal information
- Full name: Ali Nasser Saleh
- Date of birth: May 16, 1986 (age 40)
- Place of birth: Doha, Qatar
- Height: 1.78 m (5 ft 10 in)
- Position: Defender

Youth career
- 2001–2003: Al Sadd

Senior career*
Years	Team	Apps	(Gls)
2003–2013	Al Sadd	70	(0)
2009–2010	→ Lekhwiya (loan)	26	(0)
2011–2012	→ Al Wakrah (loan)		
2013–2014	Muaither SC		
2014–2015	Mesaimeer		
2015–2016	Umm Salal SC		

International career
2004–2007	Qatar	12	(0)
- * Club domestic league appearances and goals

Ali Nasser Saleh (born May 16, 1986) is a Qatari footballer who is a defender.

== International career ==
He is a member of the Qatar national football team.
