= Muhannad Naim =

Qatari footballer (born 1993)

Personal information
- Full name: Muhannad Naim Hussain
- Date of birth: 28 January 1993 (age 33)
- Place of birth: Riyadh, Saudi Arabia
- Height: 1.85 m (6 ft 1 in)
- Position: Goalkeeper

Youth career
- Al Khor

Senior career*
Years	Team	Apps	(Gls)
2009–2017	Al Sadd	17	(0)
2013–2014	→ Eupen (loan)	2	(0)
2017–2018	Al-Arabi	12	(0)
2018–2019	Al-Kharaitiyat	1	(0)
2019–2020	Umm Salal	2	(0)
2020–2021	Muaither	0	(0)

International career
2009–2013	Qatar U-20	–	(0)
2010–	Qatar U-23	4	(0)
- * Club domestic league appearances and goals

Muhannad Naim (born 28 January 1993) is a Qatari-Palestinian footballer who plays as a goalkeeper. He also currently plays for the Qatar U-21 national team as their first choice goalkeeper, and he also plays for the Qatar Olympic (U-23) team.

== Career ==
Muhannad Naim first started playing football at the age of eight. He played in Al Khor's youth team as a teenager, but later joined Al Sadd's senior team in 2009 in what was supposed to be a temporary loan.

He participated in the ASPIRE U-19 tournament held in Doha in April 2012. Qatar won the tournament, only conceding a single goal, resulting in Naim winning the "Best Goalkeeper of the Tournament" award.

In January 2013, he had undergone a training period in German club Schalke 04 in the interim of their training camp being held in Doha. Additionally, he played in a friendly for Al Sadd against Schalke, narrowly losing 2–3. Later that month, he was sent on loan to ASPIRE-owned Belgian 2nd Division club Eupen until the end of the season. He made 2 appearances for the club before returning to Al Sadd.

== Personal life ==
Naim was born in Saudi Arabia to Palestinian parents, and moved to Qatar at a young age. He is a youth international for Qatar.
