= Jassim Al-Tamimi =

Qatari footballer (born 1971)

Jassim Youssef Al Tamimi
Personal information
- Date of birth: 14 February 1971 (age 55)
- Place of birth: Qatar
- Position: Midfielder

Senior career*
Years	Team	Apps	(Gls)
1991–2000	Al-Wakrah SC		
2000–2003	Al Sadd SC		
2002–2006	Al-Wakrah SC		

International career
1994–2004	Qatar	100	(4)
- * Club domestic league appearances and goals

Jassim Youssef Al Tamimi is a Qatari former football midfielder who played for the Qatar national football team in the 2000 Asian Cup. He also played for Al Wakrah and Al Sadd. He has 100 caps for the national team.

== Career statistics ==
=== International ===
Scores and results list Qatar's goal tally first, score column indicates score after each Al-Tamimi goal.

List of international goals scored by Jassim Al-Tamimi
No.	Date	Venue	Opponent	Score	Result	Competition
1	2 June 2000	National Stadium, Kallang, Singapore	Singapore	3–0	5–1	Friendly
2	4 March 2001	Hong Kong Stadium, Causeway Bay, Hong Kong	Malaysia	5–1	5–1	2002 FIFA World Cup qualification
3	25 March 2001	Jassim bin Hamad Stadium, Doha, Qatar	Hong Kong	3–0	3–0	2002 FIFA World Cup qualification
4	24 January 2002	King Fahd International Stadium, Riyadh, Saudi Arabia	Oman	1–1	2–1	15th Arabian Gulf Cup
