= Abdulnasser Al-Obaidly =

Qatari footballer (born 1972)

Abdulnasser Al Obaidly
Personal information
- Date of birth: 2 October 1972 (age 54)
- Place of birth: Doha, Qatar
- Position: Midfielder

Senior career*
Years	Team	Apps	(Gls)
1989–2005	Al Sadd		

International career
1992–2001	Qatar	57	(5)
- * Club domestic league appearances and goals

Abdulnasser Al Obaidly is a former Qatari footballer who played as a midfielder for Qatar in the 2000 Asian Cup. He also played for Al Sadd.

== Club career ==
Al-Obaidly played for Al-Sadd throughout his entire career which spanned from 1989 till 2005.

== International career ==
In 1992, Al-Obaidly was selected to play for the Qatar national team for the 1992 Asian Cup in which he played in all three of Qatar's group stage matches. He would participate in the 1994 Gulf Cup and also the 1996 AFC Asian Cup qualification.
