= Ezzat Jadoua =

Qatari footballer (born 1983)

Personal information
- Date of birth: 16 January 1983 (age 43)
- Place of birth: Qatar
- Position: Midfielder

Senior career*
Years	Team	Apps	(Gls)
2003–2006	Al Sadd	-	(-)
2006–2008	Al Khor	-	(-)
2008–2009	Al Ahli	-	(-)
2009–2011	Al Arabi	6	(0)
2011–2012	Al Ahli	8	(0)
2012–2014	Muaither		
2014–2015	Mesaimeer		
2015–2016	Al Shamal		
2016–2017	Al Sadd		

International career
2004	Qatar	4	(0)
- * Club domestic league appearances and goals

Ezzat Jadoua (born 1983) is a Qatari football midfielder who played for Qatar in the 2004 Asian Cup. He also played for Al Sadd, Al Khor, Al Ahli and Al Arabi.
