= Sami Mohamed Wafa =

Qatari footballer

Mohamed Wafa
Personal information
- Full name: Sami Mohamed Wafa
- Position: Goalkeeper

Senior career*
Years	Team	Apps	(Gls)
1969–1988	Al Sadd	100+	

International career
1974–1986	Qatar	75	(0)
- * Club domestic league appearances and goals

Sami Mohamed Wafa is a retired naturalised Qatari footballer who played as a goalkeeper for Al Sadd and for the Qatar national team on international level.

== Club career ==
Wafa played for Al Sadd as a goalkeeper throughout his entire career, being a frequent starter during his years at the club.

== International career ==
Wafa played for Qatar from 1973 till 1986. Participating in several Gulf cup tournaments, he made his debut for the national team against Saudi Arabia, the same tournament, he helped Qatar reach the third-place spot at the 1974 Gulf Cup.

In 1984, he played at the 1984 Asian Cup and subsequently at the 1988 Asian Cup.

== Personal life ==
His daughter, Nada Arkaji, is a swimmer who represented Qatar at the 2012 Summer Olympics.
