= Fahad Al Kuwari =

Qatari footballer (born 1968)

Personal information
- Full name: Fahad Mohammed Fahad Kalib Al Sheikh Al Kuwari
- Date of birth: 19 December 1968 (age 57)
- Place of birth: Doha, Qatar
- Positions: Forward; midfielder

Senior career*
Years	Team	Apps	(Gls)
1987–1988	Al Tadamun		
1989–2002	Al Sadd		

International career
1988–2001	Qatar	41	(11)
- * Club domestic league appearances and goals

Fahad Al Kuwari (born 19 December 1968) is a retired Qatari football midfielder who played for Al Sadd and for the Qatar national team. He served as the captain of Al Sadd before retiring in 2002. He also served as the director of the Qatar national team at one point after his retirement.

== Club career ==
Al Kuwari played for Al Tadamun before moving to Al Sadd in 1989.

== International career ==
Al Kuwari was selected for Qatar in 1988, In 1992, He was integral in helping the national team win their first ever gulf cup at the 1992 Gulf Cup. He participated in the World Cup qualifiers in 1990 1994, and 1998. He played at the 2000 Asian Cup, before retiring from international football 2001.

== Post-retirement ==
He served as the director of the Qatar national team his retiring.

== Honours ==
Domestic

- Qatar Stars League (1): 1999–2000
- Emir of Qatar Cup
  - Winners (5): 1990–91, 1993–94, 1999–2000, 2000–01, 2002–03,
  - Runners-up (2): 1992–93, 2001–02
- Qatar Cup
  - Winners (1): 1998,
- Qatar Super Cup / Sheikh Jassim Cup
  - Winners (4): 1990, 1997, 1999, 2001
- Continental Elite
- Asian Cup Winners' Cup
  - Third place (1): 2001–02
- Arab Champions League
  - Winners (1): 2001
- Arab Cup Winners' Cup
  - Runners-up (1): 1992
- GCC Champions League
  - Winners (1): 1991
