= 2014 Emir of Qatar Cup =

Tournament details
- Country: Qatar
- Dates: 21 April – 17 May
- Teams: 18

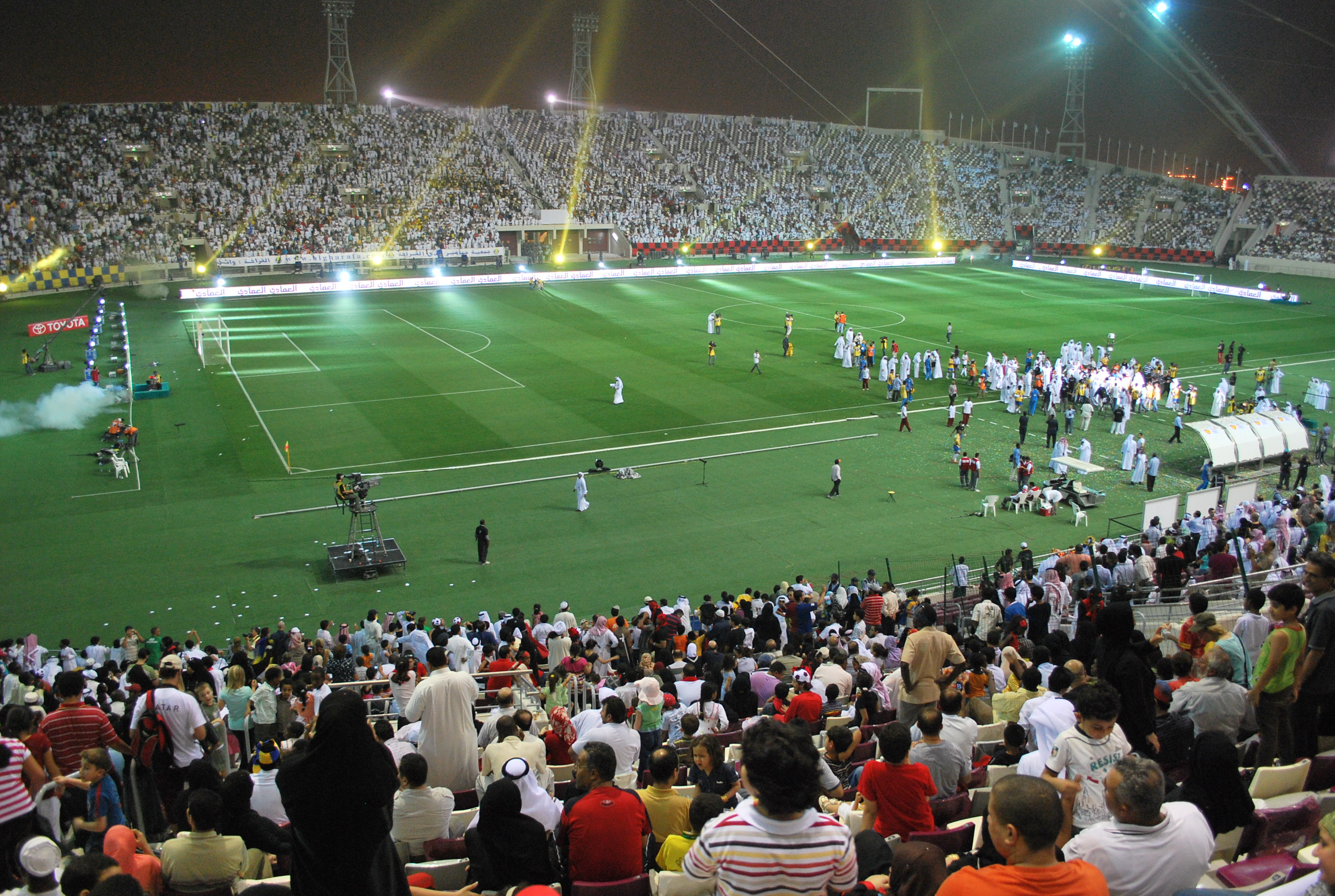
2009 Emir of Qatar Cup Final

The 2014 Emir of Qatar Cup was the 42nd edition of a men's football tournament in Qatar. It was played by the 1st and 2nd level divisions of the Qatari football league structure.

The draw for the competition was on 8 April 2014. The competition featured all teams from the 2013–14 Qatar Stars League and the top four sides from the Qatargas League. Four venues were to be used – Al Sadd Stadium, Al Arabi Stadium, Qatar SC Stadium and Khalifa Stadium.

The cup winner is guaranteed a place in the 2015 AFC Champions League.

== Round one ==
Four teams from the 2nd Division enter this round, the winners qualify for round two.

April 21, 2014
17:15

Al-Shamal	4 – 2	Al-Shahaniya

Grand Hamad Stadium

April 21, 2014
19:45

Al-Mesaimeer	2 – 4	Al-Markhiya

Grand Hamad Stadium

== Round two ==
April 27, 2014
17:15

Muaither SC	0 – 4	Qatar SC

Grand Hamad Stadium

April 27, 2014
17:15

Al-Markhiya	1 – 4	Al-Wakrah

Suheim Bin Hamad Stadium

April 27, 2014
19:45

Al-Shamal	1 – 5	Al-Khor

Grand Hamad Stadium

April 27, 2014
19:45

Al Rayyan	0 – 1	Al Kharaitiyat

Suheim Bin Hamad Stadium

== Round three ==
April 30, 2014
17:15

Qatar SC	2 – 2	Al Ahli
Penalties
	3 – 4

Grand Hamad Stadium

April 30, 2014
17:15

Al-Wakrah	2 – 2	Al Arabi
Penalties
	2 – 4

Suheim Bin Hamad Stadium

April 30, 2014
19:45

Al-Khor	1 – 0	Umm Salal

Grand Hamad Stadium

April 30, 2014
19:45

Al Kharaitiyat	2 – 3	Al Gharafa

Suheim Bin Hamad Stadium

== Quarter finals ==
May 3, 2014
17:15

Al Ahli	3 – 2	Lekhwiya

Grand Hamad Stadium

May 3, 2014
17:15

Al Arabi	0 – 2	Al-Sadd

Suheim Bin Hamad Stadium

May 3, 2014
19:45

Al-Khor	2 – 2	Al-Sailiya
Penalties
	7 – 8

Grand Hamad Stadium

May 3, 2014
19:45

Al Gharafa	0 – 0	El Jaish
Penalties
	9 – 8

Suheim Bin Hamad Stadium

== Semi finals ==
May 10, 2014
19:45

Al Ahli	2 – 2	Al-Sailiya
Penalties
	0 – 3

Grand Hamad Stadium

May 10, 2014
19:45

Al-Sadd	2 – 1	Al Gharafa

Grand Hamad Stadium

== Final ==
May 17, 2014
19:45

Al-Sadd	3 – 0	Al-Sailiya

Khalifa International Stadium
