= Mohamed Saqr =

Qatari footballer (born 1981)

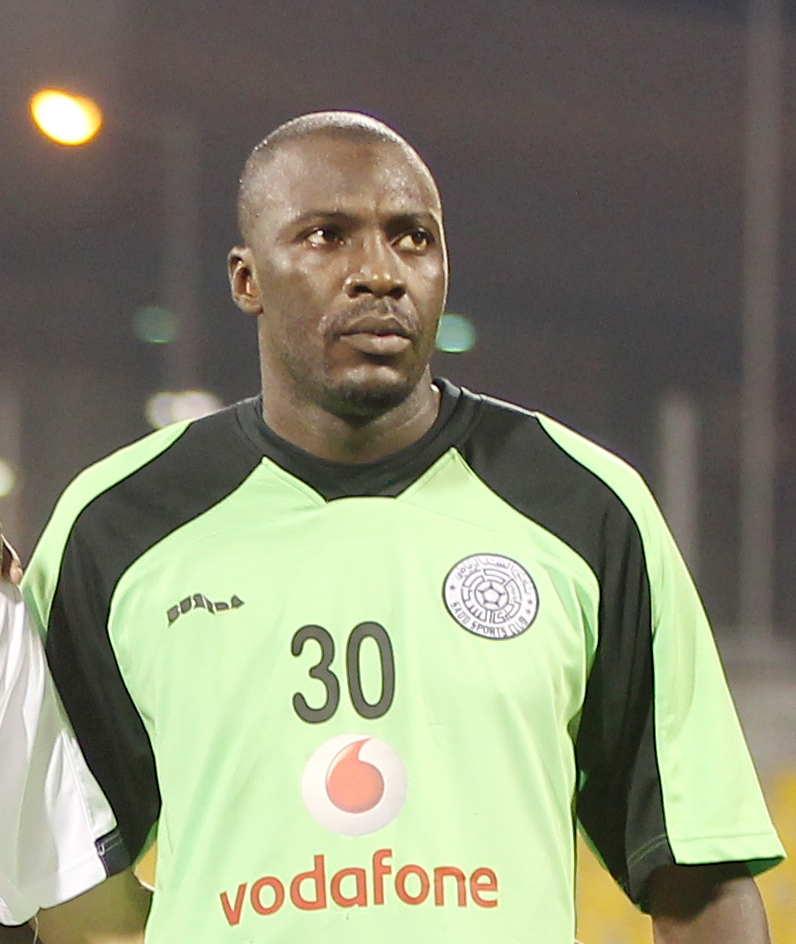
- Saqr in an Al Sadd line-up in 2012

Personal information
- Full name: Mohamed Saqr Ahmed
- Date of birth: 17 May 1981 (age 45)
- Place of birth: Dakar, Senegal
- Height: 1.90 m (6 ft 3 in)
- Position: Goalkeeper

Senior career*
Years	Team	Apps	(Gls)
2000–2003	Al Khor	45	(0)
2003–2014	Al Sadd	186	(1)
Total		231	(1)

International career
2004–2012	Qatar	79	(0)
- * Club domestic league appearances and goals

Mohamed Saqr Ahmed (born 17 May 1981) is a former professional footballer who played as a goalkeeper for Qatar Stars League sides Al Sadd and Al Khor. Born in Senegal, he represented the Qatar national team. In 2011, Saqr was a vital part of the Al Sadd squad that was crowned Champions of Asia after winning the 2011 AFC Champions League. And selected by French newspaper as the best goalkeeper in the week. He retired at the end of 2012.

== Club career ==
Saqr played in the 2011 AFC Champions League with Al Sadd, eventually going on to win the title. He received much praise for his performance in the final against Jeonbuk Hyundai Motors, in which he made many key saves during the 120 minutes, as well as two crucial saves during the penalty shoot-outs which his team won 4–2. Al Sadd's manager, Jorge Fosatti, expressed that he thought that Jeonbuk's misses had more to do with Mohammed's good saves rather than them taking bad shots. Saqr attracted worldwide attention for his stellar performance, being voted "World Player of the Week" on 7 November by Goal.com. He also won "Fan's Man of the Match" and received a mention by FIFA in the match article for his "goalkeeping heroics", describing him as arguably the most valuable player of the night.

The stunning champions league victory took Al Sadd to the FIFA Club World Cup. There, Al Sadd was pitted against Espérance, the champions of Africa, whom they defeated 2–1. Al Sadd were drawn against eventual winners Barcelona in the semi-final. Saqr had a consequential misunderstanding with Nadir Belhadj, which allowed Adriano to run the ball into the net. Saqr made several more errors in the game, allowing Barcelona to score 3 additional goals in order to settle the score 4–0.

Al Sadd would then face Kashiwa Reysol in the third-place match. It was the first time that two clubs from the same federation faced off each other in a third-place match. After a good display by Saqr, the game went straight to a penalty shoot-out with the score 0–0. Saqr yet again proved to be the hero in the penalty shoot-outs, making a superb diving save to deny Hayashi. The shoot-outs ended 5–3 in favour of Al Sadd, and was the first time a West Asian club had earned a bronze medal in the competition.

Saqr came in 14th place out of 17 in a list entitled "World's Best Goalkeeper of the Year 2011" published by IFFHS, being the only player not from South America or Europe to be included in the list.

== International career ==
Saqr played for the Qatar national team for the 17th Arabian Gulf Cup which was held on home soil. He succeeded in winning the trophy for his country, as he saved three penalty kicks, which led Qatar to the 2nd Arabian Gulf Cup trophy in their history on the end of a 6–5 penalty shoot-out against Oman.

After the sacking of Lazaroni from the Qatar national team in 2012, Paulo Autuori called up Saqr to the squad selected to face Iran in a 2014 World Cup qualifying match. Saqr did not show up to training. He later stated he did not know he was called up, before announcing his retirement from international football.

== Honours ==
Al-Sadd

- FIFA Club World Cup third place: 2011
- AFC Champions League: 2011
- Qatari Stars Cup: 2010–11
- Sheikh Jassem Cup: 2007
- Qatar Crown Prince Cup: 2006, 2007, 2008
- Emir of Qatar Cup: 2005, 2007
- Qatar Stars League: 2003–04, 2005–06, 2006–07
