= Lee Jung-soo =

South Korean footballer (born 1980)

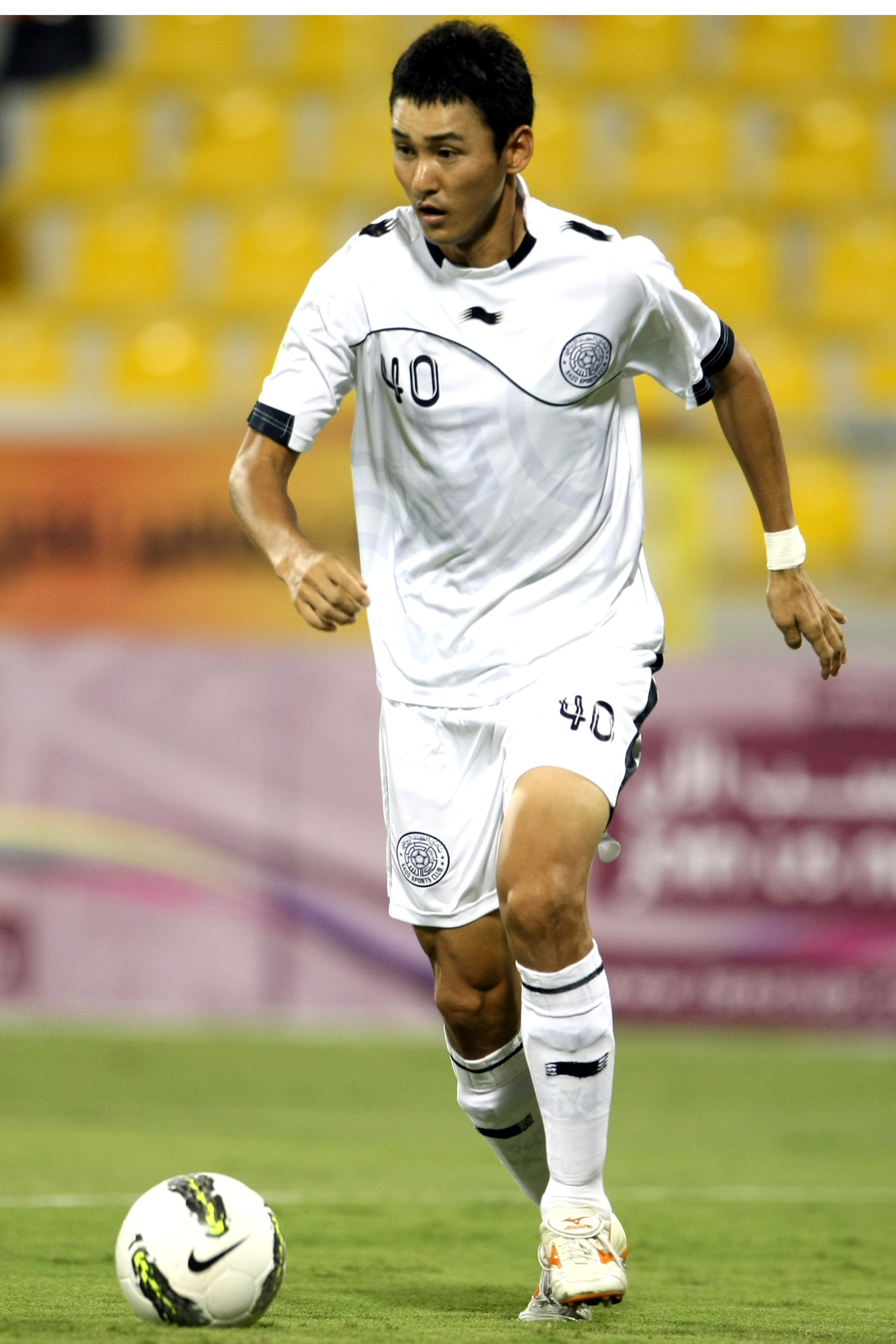
- Lee with Al-Sadd in 2011

Personal information
- Date of birth: 8 January 1980 (age 46)
- Place of birth: Gimhae, Gyeongnam, South Korea
- Height: 1.85 m (6 ft 1 in)
- Position: Centre-back

Team information
- Current team: Kanchanaburi Power (head coach)

College career
Years	Team	Apps	(Gls)
1998–2001	Kyung Hee University		

Senior career*
Years	Team	Apps	(Gls)
2002–2004	FC Seoul	29	(2)
2004–2005	Incheon United	20	(1)
2006–2008	Suwon Samsung Bluewings	46	(3)
2009	Kyoto Sanga	32	(5)
2010	Kashima Antlers	10	(3)
2010–2015	Al-Sadd	112	(10)
2016–2017	Suwon Samsung Bluewings	30	(3)
2018	Charlotte Independence	13	(0)
Total		292	(27)

International career
1998	South Korea U20	2	(0)
2001	South Korea B		
2008–2013	South Korea	54	(5)

Managerial career
- 2025–2026: Vietnam (assistant)
- 2026: Kanchanaburi Power
- 2026–: Kanchanaburi Power (assistant)
Medal record
Representing South Korea
Men's football
AFC Asian Cup
Bronze medal – third place	2011 Qatar	Team
AFC Youth Championship
Gold medal – first place	1998 Thailand	Team
EAFF Championship
Silver medal – second place	2010 Japan	Team
East Asian Games
Silver medal – second place	2001 Osaka	Team
- * Club domestic league appearances and goals

- Lee Jung-soo
- Hangul: 이정수
- Hanja: 李正秀
- RR: I Jeongsu
- MR: I Chŏngsu

Lee Jung-soo (Korean: 이정수; born 8 January 1980) is a South Korean retired professional footballer and manager, who is the assistant coach of Thai League 2 club Kanchanaburi Power.

== Club career ==
=== Career in South Korea ===
After graduating from Kyung Hee University in 2002, Lee started his professional career at a K League club Anyang LG Cheetahs. (renamed FC Seoul since 2004) He was originally a forward, but Anyang's manager Cho Kwang-rae advised him to change his role to a defender. He played for Anyang LG Cheetahs/FC Seoul, Incheon United, and Suwon Samsung Bluewings as a defender in the K League, and won a league title with Suwon in 2008.

=== Career in Japan ===
In 2009, Lee joined J1 League side Kyoto Sanga. He scored five goals in the 2009 season, showing his scoring ability. Lee also participated in the Jomo Cup, contested between K League and J.League all-star team, and was named the MVP of the game. Lee joined another J1 League club Kashima Antlers the next year, playing for it for half a year. He transferred to a Qatari club Al-Sadd after the 2010 FIFA World Cup.

=== Al-Sadd ===
In the 2011 AFC Champions League semi-final first leg against his former club Suwon, Lee was involved in a heated argument with Al-Sadd teammates following Mamadou Niang's controversial second goal, which was scored after Suwon claimed to have put the ball out to allow treatment to injured players, thus inferring possession should have been returned to the Korean club. Lee said that the goal was "unfair" and suggested Al-Sadd should give a goal back although the idea was rejected. The situation prompted Lee to walk off the pitch requiring his manager Jorge Fossati to substitute him with Ibrahim Majid for the remainder of additional time.

Al-Sadd won the AFC Champions League final against Jeonbuk Hyundai Motors on penalties. Lee was chosen to take a penalty but his shot hit the crossbar, making him the only Al-Sadd player to miss in the penalty shootout.

In June 2012, a Chinese club Guangzhou Evergrande confirmed their interest in signing Lee and, according to the Jinghua Times, claimed that they signed him following his contract rejection from Al-Sadd. However, Lee rejected the Guangzhou's offer and signed a one-year extension with Al-Sadd.

=== Retirement ===
In the 2015–16 season, Lee suffered hand and calf injury, and Al-Sadd showed a poor defence due to his absence. His team needed a new centre-back to replace him, and offered him a job as a coach instead. However, he wanted to continue his playing career, courteously declining it. After leaving Al-Sadd in January 2016, he rejoined Suwon the next month, and announced his retirement the next year.

In February 2018, Lee joined Charlotte Independence of the United Soccer League unexpectedly. He started his coaching career after playing for Charlotte for a while.

== International career ==
Lee was one of South Korea's major contributors when his country reached the knockout stage in the 2010 FIFA World Cup. He largely helped South Korea's attack by scoring two set-piece goals in the group stage.

== Career statistics ==
=== Club ===
As of match played 8 September 2018

Appearances and goals by club, season and competition
Club	Season	League			National cup		League cup		Continental		Other		Total	
Club	Season	Division	Apps	Goals	Apps	Goals	Apps	Goals	Apps	Goals	Apps	Goals	Apps	Goals
FC Seoul	2002	K League	9	1	0	0	2	0			—		11	1
FC Seoul	2003	K League	18	1	1	0	—		—		—		19	1
FC Seoul	2004	K League	2	0	0	0	0	0	—		—		2	0
FC Seoul	Total		29	2	1	0	2	0			0	0	32	2
Incheon United	2004	K League	11	0	1	0	9	0	—		—		21	0
Incheon United	2005	K League	9	1	0	0	8	0	—		—		17	1
Incheon United	Total		20	1	1	0	17	0	0	0	0	0	38	1
Suwon Samsung Bluewings	2006	K League	23	2	2	0	13	0	—		—		38	2
Suwon Samsung Bluewings	2007	K League	6	0	0	0	4	0	—		—		10	0
Suwon Samsung Bluewings	2008	K League	17	1	1	0	7	0	—		—		25	1
Suwon Samsung Bluewings	Total		46	3	3	0	24	0	0	0	0	0	73	3
Kyoto Sanga	2009	J1 League	32	5			1	0	—		—		33	5
Kashima Antlers	2010	J1 League	10	3	0	0	0	0	5	1	1 (Note: Appearance in Japanese Super Cup)	0	16	4
Al-Sadd	2010–11	Qatar Stars League	19	2					5	2	—		24	4
Al-Sadd	2011–12	Qatar Stars League	15	1					7	0	3 (Note: Appearances in FIFA Club World Cup)	0	25	1
Al-Sadd	2012–13	Qatar Stars League	21	2					—				21	2
Al-Sadd	2013–14	Qatar Stars League	22	2			4 (Note: Appearances in Qatari Stars Cup)	0	8	0			34	2
Al-Sadd	2014–15	Qatar Stars League	24	2					12	0			36	2
Al-Sadd	2015–16	Qatar Stars League	11	1					—		—		11	1
Al-Sadd	Total		112	10			4	0	32	2	3	0	151	12
Suwon Samsung Bluewings	2016	K League 1	27	3	4	0	—		0	0	—		31	3
Suwon Samsung Bluewings	2017	K League 1	3	0	0	0	—		2	0	—		5	0
Suwon Samsung Bluewings	Total		30	3	4	0	0	0	2	0	0	0	36	3
Charlotte Independence	2018	United Soccer League	13	0	0	0	—		—		—		13	0
Career total			292	27	9	0	48	0	39	3	4	0	392	30

=== International ===
Appearances and goals by national team and year
National team	Year	Apps	Goals
South Korea	2008	5	0
South Korea	2009	11	1
South Korea	2010	17	3
South Korea	2011	14	1
South Korea	2012	6	0
South Korea	2013	1	0
Career total		54	5

Results list South Korea's goal tally first.

List of international goals scored by Lee Jung-soo
No.	Date	Venue	Opponent	Score	Result	Competition
1	5 September 2009	Seoul, South Korea	Australia	2–0	3–1	Friendly
2	18 January 2010	Málaga, Spain	Finland	2–0	2–0	Friendly
3	12 June 2010	Port Elizabeth, South Africa	Greece	1–0	2–0	2010 FIFA World Cup
4	22 June 2010	Durban, South Africa	Nigeria	1–1	2–2	2010 FIFA World Cup
5	25 March 2011	Seoul, South Korea	Honduras	1–0	4–0	Friendly

== Honours ==
Suwon Samsung Bluewings

- K League 1: 2008
- Korean FA Cup: 2016
- Korean League Cup: 2008

Kashima Antlers

- Japanese Super Cup: 2010

Al-Sadd

- Qatar Stars League: 2012–13
- Emir of Qatar Cup: 2014, 2015
- Qatari Stars Cup: 2010
- Qatar Cup runner-up: 2012, 2013
- Sheikh Jassim Cup: 2014
- AFC Champions League: 2011

South Korea U20

- AFC Youth Championship: 1998

South Korea B

- East Asian Games silver medal: 2001

South Korea

- AFC Asian Cup third place: 2011
- EAFF Championship runner-up: 2010

Individual

- K League All-Star: 2008
- J.League All-Star Soccer Most Valuable Player: 2009
- J.League All-Star: 2009
- Qatar Stars League Team of the Season: 2013–14
