= Mohammed Al Yazeedi =

Qatari footballer (born 1988)

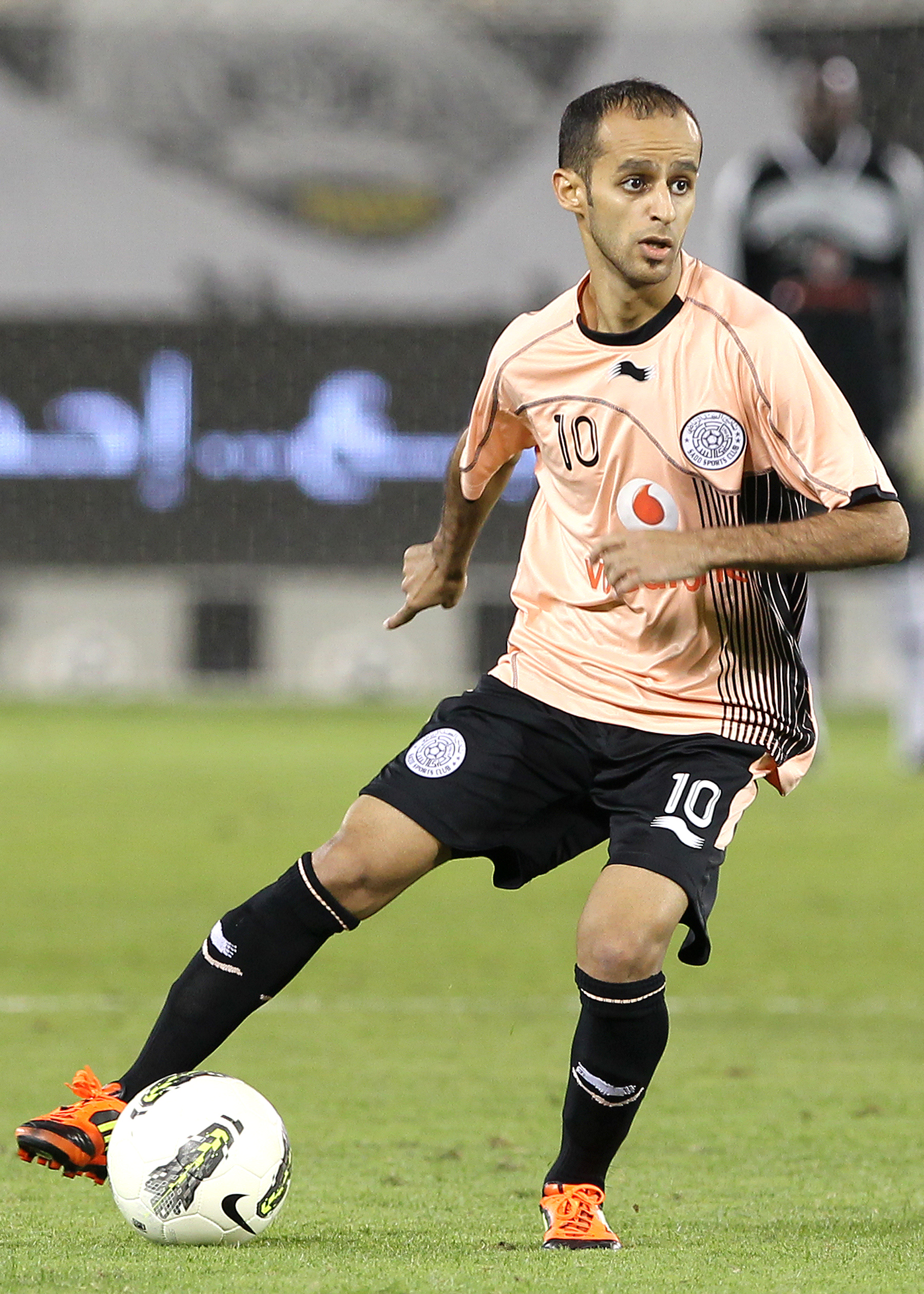
- Al Yazeedi with Al Sadd in 2012

Personal information
- Full name: Mohammed Abdurabb Al Yazeedi Al Yafei
- Date of birth: October 30, 1988 (age 38)
- Place of birth: Yafa, Yemen
- Height: 1.65 m (5 ft 5 in)
- Position: Midfielder

Senior career*
| Years | Team | Apps | (Gls) |
| 2006–2014 | Al Sadd | ? | (?) |
| 2013 | →Al-Kharaitiyat (Loan) | 8 | (1) |
| 2014–2019 | Al-Kharaitiyat | 86 | (5) |
| 2016–2017 | →El Jaish (Loan) | 24 | (0) |
| 2019–2020 | Al-Shamal | | |
| 2021 | Al-Markhiya | | |
| 2021–2022 | Muaither | | |
| 2022–2023 | Qatar SC | 0 | (0) |

International career^{‡}
| 2004–2005 | Qatar U-17 | 9 | (2) |
| 2008–2010 | Qatar | 17 | (0) |
- * Club domestic league appearances and goals as of 26 September 2022 ‡ National team caps and goals as of 26 September 2022

Mohammed Abdurabb Al Yazeedi Al Yafei (born 30 October 1988) is a footballer who plays as a midfielder. Born in Yemen, he represented Qatar internationally.

== International career ==
Al Yazeedi has made two appearances for the senior Qatar national football team, including a 2010 FIFA World Cup qualifying match against Japan on 19 November 2008.

He also participated in the 2005 FIFA U-17 World Championship.
