= 2004 AFC Asian Cup squads =

Squads for the 2004 AFC Asian Cup played in China from 17 July to 7 August 2004.

== Group A ==
=== Bahrain ===
Head Coach: (Croatia) Srećko Juričić

No.	Pos.	Player	Date of birth (age)	Caps	Club
1	GK	Abdulrahman Abdulkarim	13 May 1980 (aged 24)		(Bahrain) Al-Najma
2	DF	Mohamed Husain	31 July 1980 (aged 23)		(Bahrain) Al-Ahli
5	DF	Hassan Al Mosawi	21 September 1984 (aged 19)		(Bahrain) Manama Club
6	DF	Ghazi Al Kuwari	19 May 1977 (aged 27)		(Qatar) Al-Ahli
7	MF	Sayed Mahmood Jalal	5 November 1980 (aged 23)		(Bahrain) Muharraq Club
8	MF	Rashid Al-Dosari	24 March 1978 (aged 26)		(Qatar) Al-Arabi
9	FW	Husain Ali	31 December 1981 (aged 22)		(Qatar) Al-Rayyan
10	MF	Mohamed Salmeen	4 November 1980 (aged 23)		(Qatar) Al-Arabi
11	DF	Faisal Abdulaziz (c)	8 January 1968 (aged 36)		(Bahrain) Muharraq Club
12	DF	Mohamed Juma	13 December 1973 (aged 30)		(Bahrain) Busaiteen Club
13	MF	Talal Yousef	24 February 1975 (aged 29)		Al Kuwait
14	DF	Salman Isa	12 July 1977 (aged 27)		(Bahrain) Riffa Club
15	MF	Saleh Farhan	1 January 1981 (aged 23)		Qatar SC
16	DF	Sayed Mohamed	5 February 1983 (aged 21)		(Qatar) Al-Khor
17	DF	Hussain Baba	11 February 1982 (aged 22)		(Bahrain) Riffa Club
19	FW	Mohamed Jaffar	13 November 1979 (aged 24)		(Bahrain) Muharraq Club
20	DF	Adel Abbas	24 October 1982 (aged 21)		(Bahrain) Manama Club
21	GK	Sayed Mohammed Jaffer	25 August 1985 (aged 18)		(Bahrain) Malkiya Club
22	GK	Ali Saeed Abdulla	24 September 1979 (aged 24)		(Bahrain) Al-Ahli
23	FW	Duaij Naser	18 January 1983 (aged 21)		(Qatar) Al-Shamal
29	MF	Mohamed Hubail	23 June 1981 (aged 23)		(Qatar) Al-Gharrafa
30	FW	A'ala Hubail	25 June 1982 (aged 22)		(Qatar) Al-Gharrafa

=== China ===
Head Coach: (Netherlands) Arie Haan

No.	Pos.	Player	Date of birth (age)	Caps	Club
1	GK	Liu Yunfei	8 May 1979 (aged 25)	17	(China) Tianjin Teda FC
3	DF	Sun Xiang	15 January 1982 (aged 22)	6	(China) Shanghai Shenhua
4	DF	Zhang Yaokun	17 April 1981 (aged 23)	2	(China) Dalian Shide
5	MF	Zheng Zhi	20 August 1980 (aged 23)	20	(China) Shenzhen Jianlibao
6	MF	Shao Jiayi	10 April 1980 (aged 24)	17	(Germany) TSV 1860 München
7	DF	Sun Jihai	30 September 1977 (aged 26)	62	(England) Manchester City FC
8	MF	Zheng Bin	4 July 1977 (aged 27)	16	(China) Shenzhen Jianlibao
9	FW	Hao Haidong	25 August 1970 (aged 33)	93	(China) Dalian Shide
11	FW	Li Yi	20 June 1979 (aged 25)	18	(China) Shenzhen Jianlibao
12	DF	Wei Xin	18 April 1977 (aged 27)	20	(China) Chongqing Lifan
13	DF	Xu Yunlong	17 February 1979 (aged 25)	44	(China) Beijing Guoan
14	DF	Li Weifeng (c)	1 December 1978 (aged 25)	70	(China) Shenzhen Jianlibao
15	MF	Zhao Junzhe	19 April 1979 (aged 25)	37	(China) Liaoning FC
16	DF	Ji Mingyi	15 December 1980 (aged 23)	5	(China) Dalian Shide
18	MF	Li Xiaopeng	20 June 1975 (aged 29)	37	(China) Shandong Luneng
19	FW	Zhang Shuo	17 September 1983 (aged 20)	9	(China) Tianjin Teda FC
21	MF	Li Ming	26 January 1971 (aged 33)	78	(China) Dalian Shide
22	MF	Yan Song	20 March 1981 (aged 23)	5	(China) Dalian Shide
23	GK	Li Jian	9 December 1977 (aged 26)	6	(China) Chongqing Lifan
25	MF	Zhou Haibin	19 July 1985 (aged 18)	15	(China) Shandong Luneng
27	DF	Zhou Ting	5 February 1979 (aged 25)	11	(China) Qingdao Zhongneng
29	FW	Li Jinyu	6 July 1977 (aged 27)	41	(China) Shandong Luneng

=== Indonesia ===
Head Coach: (Bulgaria) Ivan Venkov Kolev

No.	Pos.	Player	Date of birth (age)	Caps	Club
1	GK	Hendro Kartiko	24 April 1973 (aged 31)	46	(Indonesia) Persebaya Surabaya
2	DF	Agung Setyabudi (c)	2 November 1972 (aged 31)	44	(Indonesia) PSIS Semarang
3	DF	Alexander Pulalo	8 May 1973 (aged 31)	6	(Indonesia) Persib Bandung
4	DF	Ismed Sofyan	28 August 1979 (aged 24)	25	(Indonesia) Persija Jakarta
5	DF	Aples Tecuari	21 April 1973 (aged 31)	41	(Indonesia) Persija Jakarta
6	DF	Ardi Warsidi	22 August 1979 (aged 24)	18	(Indonesia) Persija Jakarta
7	FW	Jaenal Ichwan	1 May 1977 (aged 27)	3	(Indonesia) Deltras Sidoarjo
8	FW	Elie Aiboy	20 April 1979 (aged 25)	19	(Indonesia) Persija Jakarta
10	FW	Aliyudin Ali	7 May 1980 (aged 24)	1	(Indonesia) Persikota Tangerang
11	MF	Ponaryo Astaman	25 September 1979 (aged 24)	12	(Indonesia) PSM Makassar
12	GK	Yandri Pitoy	15 January 1981 (aged 23)	9	(Indonesia) Persikota Tangerang
13	FW	Budi Sudarsono	19 September 1979 (aged 24)	19	(Indonesia) Persija Jakarta
14	MF	Syamsul Chaeruddin	9 February 1983 (aged 21)	4	(Indonesia) PSM Makassar
15	DF	Maman Abdurrahman	12 May 1982 (aged 22)	1	(Indonesia) Persijatim Solo FC
16	GK	I Komang Putra	5 May 1972 (aged 32)	11	(Indonesia) PSIS Semarang
17	DF	Harry Saputra	12 June 1981 (aged 23)	14	(Indonesia) Persikota Tangerang
18	DF	Agus Firmansyah	7 April 1980 (aged 24)	13	(Indonesia) Persikota Tangerang
19	MF	Amir Yusuf Pohan	14 September 1971 (aged 32)	6	(Indonesia) PSPS Pekanbaru
20	FW	Bambang Pamungkas	10 June 1980 (aged 24)	29	(Indonesia) Persija Jakarta
21	FW	Rochy Putiray	26 June 1970 (aged 34)	42	(Hong Kong) Kitchee SC
22	MF	Agus Indra Kurniawan	27 February 1982 (aged 22)	3	(Indonesia) Persija Jakarta
23	DF	Hamka Hamzah	29 January 1984 (aged 20)	2	(Indonesia) Persik Kediri

=== Qatar ===
Head Coach: (France) Philippe Troussier

No.	Pos.	Player	Date of birth (age)	Caps	Club
2	MF	Wesam Rizik	25 February 1981 (aged 23)		(Qatar) Al-Sadd
3	DF	Abdulrahman Mesbeh	7 February 1984 (aged 20)		(Qatar) Al-Rayyan
5	MF	Ezzat Jadoua	16 January 1983 (aged 21)		(Qatar) Al-Sadd
6	DF	Nayef Al-Khater	10 May 1978 (aged 26)		(Qatar) Al-Wakrah
7	MF	Ahmad Musa	7 October 1982 (aged 21)		(Qatar) Al-Wakrah
8	DF	Saad Al-Shammari	23 January 1984 (aged 20)		(Denmark) Esbjerg fB
9	FW	Sayed Ali Bechir	6 September 1982 (aged 21)		(Qatar) Al-Arabi
10	FW	Waleed Hamzah	7 September 1982 (aged 21)		(Qatar) Al-Arabi
12	MF	Magid Mohamed	1 October 1985 (aged 18)		(Qatar) Al-Sailiya
13	FW	Ali Mejbel	17 June 1982 (aged 22)		(Qatar) Al-Wakrah
14	DF	Saoud Fath	16 August 1980 (aged 23)		(Qatar) Al-Gharrafa
15	MF	Waleed Mohyaden	22 May 1982 (aged 22)		(Qatar) Al-Khor
16	FW	Mohammed Gholam	8 November 1980 (aged 23)		(Qatar) Al-Sadd
17	MF	Jassim Al-Tamimi (c)	14 February 1971 (aged 33)		(Qatar) Al-Wakrah
19	DF	Selman Mesbeh	27 August 1980 (aged 23)		(Qatar) Al-Rayyan
22	GK	Abdulaziz Ali	5 June 1980 (aged 24)		(Qatar) Al-Gharrafa
23	MF	Gader Mousa	10 September 1982 (aged 21)		(Qatar) Al-Shamal
25	FW	Jamal Jouhar	26 July 1987 (aged 16)		(Qatar) Al-Ahli
27	DF	Muamer Abdulrab	20 August 1982 (aged 21)		Qatar SC
28	MF	Abdulaziz Karim	10 November 1978 (aged 25)		(Qatar) Al-Arabi
29	GK	Qasem Burhan	15 December 1985 (aged 18)		(Qatar) Al-Khor
30	DF	Bilal Mohammed	2 June 1986 (aged 18)		(Qatar) Al-Gharrafa

== Group B ==
=== Jordan ===
Head Coach: (Egypt) Mahmoud El-Gohary

No.	Pos.	Player	Date of birth (age)	Caps	Club
1	GK	Amer Shafi	14 February 1982 (aged 22)		(Jordan) Al-Yarmouk
2	MF	Mustafa Shehdeh	5 February 1978 (aged 26)		(Jordan) Al-Baqa'a
3	DF	Khaled Saad	14 November 1981 (aged 22)		(Jordan) Al-Faisaly
4	DF	Rateb Al-Awadat	13 October 1970 (aged 33)		(Jordan) Al-Faisaly
5	DF	Alaa' Matalqa	7 October 1982 (aged 21)		(Jordan) Shabab Al-Hussein
6	DF	Bashar Bani Yaseen	1 June 1977 (aged 27)		(Jordan) Al-Hussein Irbid
8	MF	Hassouneh Al-Sheikh	26 January 1977 (aged 27)		(Jordan) Al-Faisaly
9	FW	Mahmoud Shelbaieh	20 May 1980 (aged 24)		(Jordan) Al-Wehdat
10	FW	Mo'ayyad Salim	1 April 1976 (aged 28)		(Jordan) Al-Faisaly
11	FW	Anas Al-Zboun	20 May 1980 (aged 24)		(Jordan) Al-Hussein Irbid
12	GK	Feras Taleb	10 May 1977 (aged 27)		(Jordan) Al-Baqa'a
13	MF	Qusai Abu Alieh	20 December 1978 (aged 25)		(Jordan) Al-Faisaly
14	MF	Haitham Al-Shboul	13 November 1974 (aged 29)		(Jordan) Al-Faisaly
16	DF	Faisal Ibrahim	22 September 1976 (aged 27)		(Jordan) Al-Wehdat
17	DF	Hatem Aqel	21 June 1978 (aged 26)		(Jordan) Al-Faisaly
18	MF	Abdullah Abu Zema (c)	4 April 1975 (aged 29)		(Jordan) Al-Wehdat
19	MF	Hassan Abdel-Fattah	17 August 1982 (aged 21)		(Jordan) Al-Wehdat
20	FW	Badran Al-Shagran	19 January 1974 (aged 30)		(Jordan) Al-Ramtha
21	FW	Abdel-Hadi Al-Maharmeh	15 September 1981 (aged 22)		(Jordan) Al-Faisaly
22	GK	Issa Hammad	19 August 1971 (aged 32)		(Jordan) Al-Ahli
23	MF	Amer Deeb	4 February 1980 (aged 24)		(Jordan) Al-Wehdat
24	FW	Awad Ragheb	5 March 1982 (aged 22)		(Jordan) Al-Wehdat

=== Kuwait ===
Head Coach: (Kuwait) Mohammed Hajeyah

No.	Pos.	Player	Date of birth (age)	Caps	Club
1	GK	Shehab Kankoune	28 April 1981 (aged 23)		(Kuwait) Kazmah
2	DF	Yaqoub Al Taher	27 October 1983 (aged 20)		Kuwait SC
4	DF	Ali Asel	28 September 1976 (aged 27)		(Kuwait) Al Salmiya
5	DF	Nohair Al-Shammari	12 July 1976 (aged 28)		(Kuwait) Al Qadsia
6	MF	Mohammad Al Buraiki	10 July 1980 (aged 24)		(Kuwait) Al Salmiya
7	MF	Nawaf Al Humaidan	8 March 1981 (aged 23)		(Kuwait) Kazmah FC
8	MF	Saleh Al Buraiki	27 February 1977 (aged 27)		(Kuwait) Al Salmiya
9	FW	Bashar Abdullah (c)	12 October 1977 (aged 26)		(Kuwait) Al Salmiya
10	FW	Khalaf Al Salamah	25 July 1979 (aged 24)		(Kuwait) Al Qadsia
11	DF	Ali Al Namash	31 October 1982 (aged 21)		(Kuwait) Al Qadsia
13	DF	Musaed Neda	8 July 1983 (aged 21)		(Qatar) Al-Wakra
14	FW	Fahad Al Hamad	1 December 1983 (aged 20)		(Kuwait) Kazmah FC
15	MF	Waleed Ali	3 November 1980 (aged 23)		Kuwait SC
16	DF	Khaled Al Shammari	2 January 1977 (aged 27)		(Kuwait) Kazmah FC
17	FW	Bader Al Mutawa	10 January 1985 (aged 19)		(Kuwait) Al Qadsia
18	MF	Jarah Al Ateeqi	15 October 1981 (aged 22)		Kuwait SC
19	FW	Hussain Seraj	28 June 1982 (aged 22)		(Kuwait) Al-Fahaheel
20	MF	Abdulrahman Mussa	4 December 1981 (aged 22)		(Kuwait) Al Qadsia
21	GK	Saleh Mehdi	9 July 1981 (aged 23)		(Kuwait) Al Salmiya
22	GK	Nawaf Al Khaldi	25 May 1981 (aged 23)		(Kuwait) Al Qadsia
23	MF	Nawaf Al Mutairi	28 September 1982 (aged 21)		(Kuwait) Al Qadsia
26	FW	Hamad Al Harbi	7 May 1980 (aged 24)		(Kuwait) Naser

=== South Korea ===
Head Coach: (Netherlands) Jo Bonfrère

No.	Pos.	Player	Date of birth (age)	Caps	Club
1	GK	Lee Woon-jae (c)	26 April 1973 (aged 31)		(South Korea) Suwon Samsung Bluewings
2	DF	Park Jin-sub	11 March 1977 (aged 27)		(South Korea) Ulsan Hyundai Horangi
3	DF	Park Jae-hong	10 November 1978 (aged 25)		(South Korea) Jeonbuk Hyundai Motors
4	DF	Choi Jin-cheul	26 March 1971 (aged 33)		(South Korea) Jeonbuk Hyundai Motors
5	MF	Kim Nam-il	14 March 1977 (aged 27)		(South Korea) Jeonnam Dragons
7	DF	Kim Tae-young	8 November 1970 (aged 33)		(South Korea) Jeonnam Dragons
9	FW	Seol Ki-hyeon	8 January 1979 (aged 25)		(Belgium) Anderlecht
10	DF	Hyun Young-min	25 December 1979 (aged 24)		(South Korea) Ulsan Hyundai Horangi
12	DF	Lee Young-pyo	23 April 1977 (aged 27)		(Netherlands) PSV Eindhoven
13	DF	Lee Eul-yong	8 September 1975 (aged 28)		(South Korea) FC Seoul
14	MF	Chung Kyung-ho	22 May 1980 (aged 24)		(South Korea) Ulsan Hyundai Horangi
15	DF	Lee Min-sung	23 June 1973 (aged 31)		(South Korea) Pohang Steelers
16	FW	Cha Du-ri	25 July 1980 (aged 23)		(Germany) Eintracht Frankfurt
17	DF	Kim Jung-kyum	9 June 1976 (aged 28)		(South Korea) Jeonnam Dragons
18	FW	Kim Eun-jung	8 April 1979 (aged 25)		(South Korea) FC Seoul
19	FW	Ahn Jung-hwan	27 January 1976 (aged 28)		(Japan) Yokohama F. Marinos
20	FW	Lee Dong-gook	29 April 1979 (aged 25)		(South Korea) Gwangju Sangmu Phoenix
21	MF	Park Ji-sung	25 February 1981 (aged 23)		(Netherlands) PSV Eindhoven
23	GK	Kim Yong-dae	11 October 1979 (aged 24)		(South Korea) Busan I'Cons
25	DF	Park Yo-seb	3 December 1980 (aged 23)		(South Korea) FC Seoul
28	DF	Kim Jin-kyu	16 February 1985 (aged 19)		(South Korea) Jeonnam Dragons
30	GK	Cha Gi-suk	26 December 1986 (aged 17)		(South Korea) Seoul Physical Education High School

=== United Arab Emirates ===
Head Coach: (Netherlands) Aad de Mos

No.	Pos.	Player	Date of birth (age)	Caps	Club
1	GK	Juma Rashed (c)	12 December 1972 (aged 31)		(United Arab Emirates) Al-Shabab
3	MF	Tawfeeq Abdul Razzaq	1 July 1982 (aged 22)		(United Arab Emirates) Al-Wahda
4	DF	Omran Jesmi	1 September 1976 (aged 27)		(United Arab Emirates) Al-Shaab
5	MF	Abdulsalaam Jumaa	26 May 1979 (aged 25)		(United Arab Emirates) Al-Wahda
6	DF	Rashid Abdul Rahman	20 October 1975 (aged 28)		(United Arab Emirates) Al-Shaab
8	MF	Abdul Azeez Mohamed	16 September 1977 (aged 26)		(United Arab Emirates) Al-Sharjah
9	FW	Salem Saad	1 September 1978 (aged 25)		(United Arab Emirates) Al-Shabab
10	FW	Mohamed Rashid	28 September 1978 (aged 25)		(United Arab Emirates) Al-Shaab
12	MF	Rami Yaslam	11 June 1981 (aged 23)		(United Arab Emirates) Al Ain Club
13	MF	Shehab Ahmed	29 March 1984 (aged 20)		(United Arab Emirates) Al Ain Club
14	DF	Basheer Saeed	28 June 1981 (aged 23)		(United Arab Emirates) Al-Wahda
16	MF	Sultan Rashed	5 December 1976 (aged 27)		(United Arab Emirates) Al Ain Club
17	GK	Waleed Salem	28 October 1980 (aged 23)		(United Arab Emirates) Al Ain Club
18	FW	Ismail Matar	8 April 1983 (aged 21)		(United Arab Emirates) Al-Wahda
19	DF	Khalid Ali	24 March 1981 (aged 23)		(United Arab Emirates) Al-Jazira Club
21	DF	Humaid Fakher	3 November 1978 (aged 25)		(United Arab Emirates) Al Ain Club
23	MF	Nawaf Mubarak	31 August 1981 (aged 22)		(United Arab Emirates) Al-Sharjah
24	MF	Subait Khater	27 February 1980 (aged 24)		(United Arab Emirates) Al Ain Club
25	DF	Mohammad Qassim	9 November 1981 (aged 22)		(United Arab Emirates) Al Ain Club
26	MF	Salem Khamis Faraj	19 September 1980 (aged 23)		(United Arab Emirates) Al Ain Club
28	FW	Mohamed Malallah	1 April 1984 (aged 20)		(United Arab Emirates) Al Khaleej Club
29	DF	Saleh Abdulla	8 December 1978 (aged 25)		(United Arab Emirates) Al-Jazira Club

== Group C ==
=== Iraq ===
Head Coach: (Iraq) Adnan Hamad

No.	Pos.	Player	Date of birth (age)	Caps	Club
1	GK	Uday Talib	1 July 1981 (aged 23)		(Iraq) Al-Zawraa
2	DF	Saad Attiya	26 February 1987 (aged 17)		(Iraq) Al-Zawraa
3	DF	Bassim Abbas	1 July 1982 (aged 22)		(Iraq) Al-Talaba
4	DF	Haidar Abdul-Jabar	25 August 1976 (aged 27)		(Iraq) Al-Zawraa
6	MF	Salih Sadir	21 August 1981 (aged 22)		(Egypt) Al-Zamalek
7	FW	Emad Mohammed	24 July 1982 (aged 21)		(Qatar) Al-Ittihad
9	FW	Razzaq Farhan	1 July 1977 (aged 27)		Qatar SC
10	FW	Younis Mahmoud	3 February 1983 (aged 21)		(Iraq) Al-Talaba
11	MF	Hawar Mulla Mohammed	1 June 1981 (aged 23)		(Iraq) Al Quwa Al Jawiya
12	DF	Haidar Abdul-Razzaq	9 June 1982 (aged 22)		(Iraq) Al-Talaba
13	MF	Haidar Sabah	15 March 1986 (aged 18)		(Iraq) Al-Zawraa
14	DF	Haidar Abdul-Amir	2 November 1982 (aged 21)		(Iraq) Al-Zawraa
15	MF	Hassan Turki	1 July 1981 (aged 23)		(Iraq) Al-Talaba
16	FW	Ahmad Mnajed	13 December 1981 (aged 22)		(Iraq) Al-Zawraa
17	FW	Ahmad Salah	9 March 1982 (aged 22)		(Egypt) Al-Zamalek
18	MF	Mahdi Karim	10 December 1983 (aged 20)		(Iraq) Al-Talaba
19	MF	Nashat Akram	12 September 1984 (aged 19)		(Saudi Arabia) Al-Shabab
21	GK	Ahmad Ali	2 August 1982 (aged 21)		(Iraq) Al-Zawraa
22	GK	Noor Sabri	18 June 1984 (aged 20)		(Iraq) Al-Zawraa
23	MF	Yassir Raad	25 June 1983 (aged 21)		(Iraq) Al-Zawraa
24	MF	Qusay Munir	12 April 1981 (aged 23)		(Iraq) Al Quwa Al Jawiya
25	MF	Abdul-Wahab Abu Al-Hail (c)	21 December 1975 (aged 28)		(Iran) Esteghlal Ahvaz

=== Saudi Arabia ===
Head Coach: (Netherlands) Gerard van der Lem

No.	Pos.	Player	Date of birth (age)	Caps	Club
2	DF	Ahmed Dokhi	25 October 1976 (aged 27)		(Saudi Arabia) Al-Hilal
3	DF	Redha Tukar	29 November 1975 (aged 28)		(Saudi Arabia) Al-Ittihad
4	DF	Hamad Al-Montashari	22 June 1982 (aged 22)		(Saudi Arabia) Al-Ittihad
5	DF	Naif Al-Qadi	3 April 1979 (aged 25)		(Saudi Arabia) Al-Ahli
6	MF	Saad Al-Dosari	3 September 1977 (aged 26)		(Saudi Arabia) Al-Hilal
7	FW	Ibrahim Sowed	21 July 1974 (aged 29)		(Saudi Arabia) Al-Ittihad
9	FW	Yasser Al-Qahtani	10 October 1982 (aged 21)		(Saudi Arabia) Al-Qadisiya
10	MF	Mohammad Al-Shalhoub	8 December 1980 (aged 23)		(Saudi Arabia) Al-Hilal
13	DF	Ali Al-Abdali	5 February 1979 (aged 25)		(Saudi Arabia) Al-Ahli
14	MF	Saud Kariri	8 July 1980 (aged 24)		(Saudi Arabia) Al-Ittihad
15	FW	Marzouk Al-Otaibi	7 November 1975 (aged 28)		(Saudi Arabia) Al-Ittihad
16	MF	Khamis Al-Owairan (c)	30 July 1973 (aged 30)		(Saudi Arabia) Al-Ittihad
19	MF	Saheb Al-Abdulla	21 July 1977 (aged 26)		(Saudi Arabia) Al-Ahli
20	MF	Abdul Al-Janoubi	21 July 1974 (aged 29)		(Saudi Arabia) Al-Nassr
21	GK	Mabrouk Zaid	11 February 1979 (aged 25)		(Saudi Arabia) Al-Ittihad
22	GK	Mansour Al-Naje	1 August 1978 (aged 25)		(Saudi Arabia) Al-Ahli
23	GK	Tariq Al-Hargan	4 November 1984 (aged 19)		(Saudi Arabia) Al-Shabab
24	FW	Abdulrahman Al-Bishi	1 July 1982 (aged 22)		(Saudi Arabia) Al-Nassr
25	FW	Yusri Al Bashah	27 July 1979 (aged 24)		(Saudi Arabia) Al-Ettifaq
28	MF	Saad Al-Zahrani	1 July 1980 (aged 24)		(Saudi Arabia) Al-Nassr
29	FW	Talal Al-Meshal	7 June 1978 (aged 26)		(Saudi Arabia) Al-Ahli
30	DF	Saod Al-Kaebari	12 August 1980 (aged 23)		(Saudi Arabia) Al-Ahli

=== Turkmenistan ===
Head Coach: (Turkmenistan) Rahym Kurbanmämmedow

No.	Pos.	Player	Date of birth (age)	Caps	Club
1	GK	Ýewgeniý Naboýçenko	17 May 1970 (aged 34)		(Kazakhstan) Kairat
2	DF	Rasim Kerimow	13 July 1979 (aged 25)		(Ukraine) Vorskla Poltava
3	DF	Goçguly Goçgulyýew	26 May 1977 (aged 27)		(Uzbekistan) Pakhtakor Tashkent
4	DF	Guwanç Rejepow	20 May 1982 (aged 22)		(Turkmenistan) Nisa Aşgabat
6	MF	Gurbangeldi Durdyýew (c)	12 January 1973 (aged 31)		(Turkmenistan) Nisa Aşgabat
7	DF	Kamil Mingazow	21 June 1968 (aged 36)		(Turkmenistan) Nisa Aşgabat
8	MF	Artýom Nazarow	20 June 1977 (aged 27)		(Turkmenistan) Nisa Aşgabat
9	MF	Arif Mirzoýew	13 January 1980 (aged 24)		(Turkmenistan) Nisa Aşgabat
11	FW	Daýançgylyç Urazow	15 December 1978 (aged 25)		(Kazakhstan) Ekibastuzets
12	FW	Wýaçeslaw Krendelew	24 July 1982 (aged 21)		(Kazakhstan) Taraz
13	FW	Guwançmuhammet Öwekow	2 February 1981 (aged 23)		(Ukraine) Vorskla Poltava
14	MF	Rustam Saparow	10 April 1978 (aged 26)		(Turkmenistan) Nebitçi Balkanabat
15	DF	Omar Berdiýew	25 June 1979 (aged 25)		(Kazakhstan) Atyrau
16	GK	Baýramnyýaz Berdiýew	13 September 1974 (aged 29)		(Kazakhstan) Esil Bogatyru
20	MF	Begençmuhammet Kulyýew	4 April 1977 (aged 27)		(Kazakhstan) Vostok
21	FW	Wladimir Baýramow	2 August 1980 (aged 23)		(Russia) Rubin Kazan
22	MF	Nazar Baýramow	4 September 1982 (aged 21)		(Ukraine) Vorskla Poltava
24	FW	Ýewgeniý Zemskow	17 March 1982 (aged 22)		(Turkmenistan) Nisa Aşgabat
25	MF	Witaliý Alikperow	1 August 1978 (aged 25)		(Turkmenistan) Nebitçi Balkanabat
26	DF	Baýramdurdi Meredow	27 March 1979 (aged 25)		(Turkmenistan) Nebitçi Balkanabat
28	DF	Arsen Bagdasarýan	11 March 1977 (aged 27)		(Turkmenistan) Nisa Aşgabat
30	GK	Pawel Harçik	5 April 1979 (aged 25)		(Russia) Neftekhimik

=== Uzbekistan ===
Head Coach: (Uzbekistan) Ravshan Khaydarov

No.	Pos.	Player	Date of birth (age)	Caps	Club
1	GK	Aleksei Poliakov	28 March 1974 (aged 30)		(Russia) Krylia Sovetov Samara
2	DF	Bakhtiyor Ashurmatov	25 March 1976 (aged 28)		(Uzbekistan) Pakhtakor Tashkent
3	DF	Andrei Fyodorov	10 April 1971 (aged 33)		(Russia) Rubin Kazan
4	MF	Mirdjalal Kasimov (c)	17 September 1970 (aged 33)		(Russia) Alania Vladikavkaz
6	MF	Leonid Koshelev	20 December 1979 (aged 24)		(Uzbekistan) Pakhtakor Tashkent
7	FW	Andrey Akopyants	27 August 1977 (aged 26)		(Russia) Rostov
8	MF	Server Djeparov	3 October 1982 (aged 21)		(Uzbekistan) Pakhtakor Tashkent
9	FW	Anvarjon Soliev	5 February 1978 (aged 26)		(Uzbekistan) Pakhtakor Tashkent
11	FW	Vladimir Shishelov	8 November 1979 (aged 24)		(Uzbekistan) Pakhtakor Tashkent
12	GK	Ignatiy Nesterov	20 June 1983 (aged 21)		(Uzbekistan) Pakhtakor Tashkent
13	DF	Shavkat Raimkulov	7 May 1984 (aged 20)		(Uzbekistan) Traktor Tashkent
15	FW	Aleksandr Geynrikh	6 October 1984 (aged 19)		(Russia) CSKA Moscow
17	FW	Zafar Kholmuradov	15 October 1976 (aged 27)		(Uzbekistan) Nasaf Qarshi
18	MF	Timur Kapadze	5 September 1981 (aged 22)		(Uzbekistan) Pakhtakor Tashkent
20	MF	Ildar Magdeev	11 April 1984 (aged 20)		(Uzbekistan) Pakhtakor Tashkent
21	GK	Yevgeni Safonov	6 July 1977 (aged 27)		(Russia) Shinnik Yaroslavl
22	DF	Nikolay Shirshov	22 June 1974 (aged 30)		(Russia) Rostov
23	MF	Ilyos Zeytulayev	13 August 1984 (aged 19)		(Italy) Juventus
24	DF	Asror Aliqulov	12 September 1978 (aged 25)		(Uzbekistan) Pakhtakor Tashkent
25	DF	Islom Inomov	30 May 1984 (aged 20)		(Uzbekistan) Pakhtakor Tashkent
26	FW	Marat Bikmoev	1 July 1986 (aged 18)		(Uzbekistan) Pakhtakor Tashkent
28	DF	Aleksey Nikolaev	5 September 1979 (aged 24)		(Uzbekistan) Pakhtakor Tashkent

== Group D ==
=== Iran ===
Head Coach: (Croatia) Branko Ivanković

No.	Pos.	Player	Date of birth (age)	Caps	Club
1	GK	Ebrahim Mirzapour	16 September 1978 (aged 25)		(Iran) Foolad
2	MF	Mehdi Mahdavikia	24 July 1977 (aged 26)		(Germany) Hamburger SV
3	DF	Mehdi Amirabadi	22 February 1979 (aged 25)		(Iran) Saipa
4	DF	Yahya Golmohammadi	16 March 1971 (aged 33)		(Iran) Persepolis
5	DF	Rahman Rezaei	20 February 1975 (aged 29)		(Italy) Messina
6	MF	Javad Nekounam	7 September 1980 (aged 23)		(Iran) PAS Tehran
7	MF	Hamed Kavianpour	1 December 1978 (aged 25)		(Iran) Persepolis
8	MF	Ali Karimi	8 November 1978 (aged 25)		(United Arab Emirates) Al-Ahli
10	FW	Ali Daei (c)	21 March 1969 (aged 35)		(Iran) Persepolis
12	GK	Hassan Roudbarian	6 July 1978 (aged 26)		(Iran) PAS Tehran
13	DF	Hossein Kaebi	23 September 1985 (aged 18)		(Iran) Foolad
14	FW	Arash Borhani	14 September 1983 (aged 20)		(Iran) PAS Tehran
15	DF	Ebrahim Taghipour	23 September 1976 (aged 27)		(Iran) Zob Ahan
16	FW	Reza Enayati	23 September 1976 (aged 27)		(Iran) Esteghlal
17	MF	Iman Mobali	3 November 1982 (aged 21)		(Iran) Foolad
18	DF	Ali Badavi	20 June 1982 (aged 22)		(Iran) Foolad
19	DF	Jalal Kameli Mofrad	15 May 1981 (aged 23)		(Iran) Foolad
20	DF	Mohammad Nosrati	10 January 1982 (aged 22)		(Iran) PAS Tehran
21	GK	Mehdi Rahmati	2 February 1983 (aged 21)		(Iran) Fajr Sepasi
26	MF	Mohammad Alavi	29 January 1982 (aged 22)		(Iran) Foolad
27	DF	Sattar Zare	28 January 1982 (aged 22)		(Iran) Bargh Shiraz
29	MF	Farzad Majidi	9 September 1977 (aged 26)		(Iran) Esteghlal

=== Japan ===
Head Coach: (Brazil) Zico

No.	Pos.	Player	Date of birth (age)	Caps	Club
1	GK	Seigo Narazaki	15 April 1976 (aged 28)	44	(Japan) Nagoya Grampus Eight
3	DF	Makoto Tanaka	8 August 1975 (aged 28)	4	(Japan) Jubilo Iwata
4	MF	Yasuhito Endo	28 January 1980 (aged 24)	20	(Japan) Gamba Osaka
5	DF	Tsuneyasu Miyamoto (c)	7 February 1977 (aged 27)	35	(Japan) Gamba Osaka
6	MF	Kōji Nakata	9 July 1979 (aged 25)	40	(Japan) Kashima Antlers
8	MF	Mitsuo Ogasawara	5 April 1979 (aged 25)	22	(Japan) Kashima Antlers
10	MF	Shunsuke Nakamura	24 June 1978 (aged 26)	39	(Italy) Reggina Calcio
11	FW	Takayuki Suzuki	5 June 1976 (aged 28)	34	(Japan) Kashima Antlers
12	GK	Yoichi Doi	25 July 1973 (aged 30)	1	(Japan) F.C. Tokyo
14	MF	Alessandro dos Santos	20 July 1977 (aged 26)	35	(Japan) Urawa Reds
15	MF	Takashi Fukunishi	1 September 1976 (aged 27)	29	(Japan) Jubilo Iwata
16	MF	Toshiya Fujita	4 October 1971 (aged 32)	19	(Japan) Jubilo Iwata
17	DF	Atsuhiro Miura	24 July 1974 (aged 29)	21	(Japan) Tokyo Verdy
18	DF	Naoki Matsuda	14 March 1977 (aged 27)	36	(Japan) Yokohama F. Marinos
19	FW	Masashi Motoyama	20 June 1979 (aged 25)	11	(Japan) Kashima Antlers
20	FW	Keiji Tamada	11 April 1980 (aged 24)	8	(Japan) Kashiwa Reysol
21	DF	Akira Kaji	13 January 1980 (aged 24)	10	(Japan) F.C. Tokyo
22	DF	Yuji Nakazawa	25 February 1978 (aged 26)	20	(Japan) Yokohama F. Marinos
23	GK	Yoshikatsu Kawaguchi	15 August 1975 (aged 28)	58	(Denmark) FC Nordsjælland
24	MF	Norihiro Nishi	9 May 1980 (aged 24)	2	(Japan) Jubilo Iwata
25	DF	Takayuki Chano	23 November 1976 (aged 27)	2	(Japan) JEF United Ichihara
26	MF	Takuya Yamada	24 August 1974 (aged 29)	3	(Japan) Tokyo Verdy

=== Oman ===
Head Coach: (Czech Republic) Milan Máčala

No.	Pos.	Player	Date of birth (age)	Caps	Club
2	DF	Mohammed Rabia Al-Noobi (c)	10 May 1981 (aged 23)		(Saudi Arabia) Al-Wahda
3	MF	Ayiman Suroor Al-Maawali	25 April 1980 (aged 24)		(Oman) Al-Seeb Club
4	DF	Said Suwailim Al-Shoon	28 August 1983 (aged 20)		(Oman) Muscat Club
5	DF	Hussain Mustahil	3 May 1980 (aged 24)		(Kuwait) Khaitan
6	MF	Hamdi Hubais	27 January 1984 (aged 20)		(Kuwait) Naser
8	FW	Badar Al-Maimani	16 July 1984 (aged 20)		(Saudi Arabia) Al-Riyadh
9	FW	Hashim Saleh	15 October 1981 (aged 22)		(Oman) Al-Nasr
10	MF	Fawzi Bashir	6 May 1984 (aged 20)		(Oman) Al-Nasr
11	FW	Yousuf Shaaban	4 November 1982 (aged 21)		(Oman) Dhofar Club
12	MF	Ahmed Mubarak Al-Mahaijri	23 February 1985 (aged 19)		(Saudi Arabia) Al-Wahda
14	MF	Mohamed Hamed	2 December 1982 (aged 21)		(Oman) Al-Oruba Sur
16	MF	Mohammed Mubarek	19 July 1984 (aged 19)		Oman Club
17	DF	Hassan Mudhafar Al-Gheilani	26 June 1980 (aged 24)		(Oman) Al-Oruba Sur
18	MF	Sultan Al-Touqi	2 January 1984 (aged 20)		(Oman) Muscat Club
19	DF	Nabil Ashoor	7 April 1982 (aged 22)		(Oman) Al-Nasr
20	FW	Amad Al-Hosni	18 July 1984 (aged 19)		(Saudi Arabia) Al-Riyadh
21	MF	Ahmed Hadid Al-Mukhaini	18 July 1984 (aged 19)		(Oman) Talia Club
22	GK	Badar Jumaa	6 December 1981 (aged 22)		(Oman) Dhofar Club
23	DF	Badar Al-Mahruqy	12 December 1979 (aged 24)		(Oman) Muscat Club
24	GK	Ali Talib	14 November 1984 (aged 19)		(Oman) Sur Club
25	DF	Khalifa Ayil Al-Naufli	1 March 1984 (aged 20)		(Saudi Arabia) Al-Riyadh
26	GK	Ali Al-Habsi	30 December 1981 (aged 22)		(Norway) FC Lyn Oslo

=== Thailand ===
Head Coach: (Thailand) Chatchai Paholpat

No.	Pos.	Player	Date of birth (age)	Caps	Club
3	DF	Niweat Siriwong	18 July 1977 (aged 26)		(Vietnam) Đông Á Bank
4	DF	Peeratat Phoruendee	15 March 1979 (aged 25)		(Thailand) BEC Tero Sasana
6	DF	Choketawee Promrut (c)	16 March 1975 (aged 29)		(Singapore) Tampines Rovers FC
7	MF	Narongchai Vachiraban	16 February 1981 (aged 23)		(Thailand) BEC Tero Sasana
8	MF	Therdsak Chaiman	29 September 1973 (aged 30)		(Vietnam) Đông Á Bank
12	MF	Nirut Surasiang	20 February 1979 (aged 25)		(Vietnam) SQC Binh Dinh F.C.
14	FW	Sarayuth Chaikamdee	24 September 1981 (aged 22)		(Thailand) Thai Port FC
15	DF	Phaitoon Thiabma	13 September 1981 (aged 22)		(Thailand) Osotspa FC
16	MF	Sakda Joemdee	7 April 1982 (aged 22)		(Vietnam) Đông Á Bank
18	GK	Sinthaweechai Hathairattanakool	23 March 1982 (aged 22)		(Thailand) TTM Samut Sakhon
19	MF	Datsakorn Thonglao	30 December 1983 (aged 20)		(Thailand) BEC Tero Sasana
21	MF	Issawa Singthong	7 October 1980 (aged 23)		(Vietnam) SQC Binh Dinh F.C.
22	GK	Punuwat Tangunurat	11 June 1980 (aged 24)		(Thailand) Krung Thai Bank FC
23	FW	Sutee Suksomkit	5 June 1980 (aged 24)		(Singapore) Home United FC
24	DF	Jetsada Jitsawad	5 April 1980 (aged 24)		(Thailand) TTM Samut Sakhon
25	DF	Tada Keelalay	4 April 1984 (aged 20)		(Thailand) Bangkok Bank FC
26	DF	Worachai Surinsirirat	26 March 1973 (aged 31)		(Thailand) BEC Tero Sasana
27	MF	Pichitphong Choeichiu	28 August 1982 (aged 21)		(Thailand) Krung Thai Bank FC
28	DF	Nattaporn Phanrit	11 January 1982 (aged 22)		(Thailand) TTM Samut Sakhon
29	MF	Rangsan Viwatchaichok	22 January 1979 (aged 25)		(Thailand) Bangkok Bank FC
30	DF	Supachai Komsilp	18 February 1980 (aged 24)		(Thailand) Krung Thai Bank FC
