= 18th Arabian Gulf Cup squads =

This article lists the confirmed national football squads for the 18th Arabian Gulf Cup tournament held in UAE between January 17 and January 30, 2007.

== Group A ==
=== Kuwait ===
Head coach: Saleh Zakaria

No.	Pos.	Player	Date of birth (age)	Caps	Goals	Club
	GK	Nawaf Al-Khaldi	25 May 1981 (aged 25)	22	0	(Kuwait Football Association) Qadsia SC
	DF	Ali Al Namash	31 October 1982 (aged 24)	8	0	(Kuwait Football Association) Qadsia SC
	DF	Musaed Neda	8 July 1983 (aged 23)	38	6	(Kuwait Football Association) Qadsia SC
	DF	Yaqoub Al Taher	27 October 1983 (aged 23)	36	0	(Kuwait Football Association) Kuwait SC
	DF	Fahad Awadh	26 February 1985 (aged 21)	9	0	(Kuwait Football Association) Kuwait SC
	DF	Ahmad Al-Eidan	1 October 1982 (aged 24)	9	0	(Kuwait Football Association) Al-Salmiya SC
	DF	Yousef Zayed	2 September 1979 (aged 27)	18	0	(Kuwait Football Association) Kuwait SC
	DF	Fayez Bandar	7 December 1983 (aged 23)	0	0	(Kuwait Football Association) Qadsia SC
	DF	Ahmad Al Subaih	6 October 1980 (aged 26)	18	2	(Kuwait Football Association) Kuwait SC
	MF	Jarah Al Ateeqi	15 October 1981 (aged 25)	34	1	(Kuwait Football Association) Kuwait SC
	MF	Nawaf Al Humaidan	8 March 1981 (aged 25)	16	2	(Kuwait Football Association) Kazma SC
	MF	Nawaf Al-Mutairi	28 September 1982 (aged 24)	28	1	(Kuwait Football Association) Qadsia SC
	MF	Waleed Ali	3 November 1980 (aged 26)	42	3	(Kuwait Football Association) Kuwait SC
	MF	Mohamed Jarragh	10 November 1981 (aged 25)	40	2	(Kuwait Football Association) Al-Arabi SC
	MF	Hamad Al-Tayyar	10 February 1982 (aged 24)	22	0	(Kuwait Football Association) Kazma SC
	FW	Bader Al-Mutawa	10 January 1985 (aged 22)	56	19	(Kuwait Football Association) Qadsia SC
	FW	Fahad Al-Rashidi	31 December 1984 (aged 22)	2	2	(Kuwait Football Association) Al-Tadamon SC
	FW	Hussain Al-Musawi	11 July 1988 (aged 18)	0	0	(Kuwait Football Association) Al-Arabi SC
	FW	Fahad Al Hamad	1 December 1983 (aged 23)	30	9	(Kuwait Football Association) Kazma SC

=== Oman ===
Head coach: (Czech Republic) Milan Máčala

No.	Pos.	Player	Date of birth (age)	Caps	Goals	Club
	GK	Ali Al-Habsi	30 December 1981 (aged 25)	42	0	(The Football Association) Bolton Wanderers
	DF	Said Al-Shoon	28 August 1983 (aged 23)	36	0	(Qatar Football Association) Umm Salal
	DF	Hassan Mudhafar Al-Gheilani	26 June 1980 (aged 26)	42	3	(Qatar Football Association) Al-Ahli
	DF	Mohammed Rabia Al-Noobi	10 May 1981 (aged 25)	50	0	(Qatar Football Association) Al Sadd
	DF	Khalifa Ayil Al-Noufali	1 March 1984 (aged 22)	41	6	(Qatar Football Association) Al Sadd
	DF	Jumaa Abdullah	2 March 1980 (aged 26)	19	0	(Qatar Football Association) Al-Khor SC
	DF	Ali Salim Al-Farsi	30 July 1987 (aged 19)	2	0	(Oman Football Association)
	DF	Hamad Hamdan Al-Bloushi	8 January 1984 (aged 23)	0	0	(Oman Football Association)
	MF	Fawzi Bashir	6 May 1984 (aged 22)	73	22	(Kuwait Football Association) Qadsia
	MF	Badar Al-Maimani	16 July 1984 (aged 22)	43	13	(Qatar Football Association) Al-Ahli
	MF	Ahmed Hadid Al-Mukhaini	18 July 1984 (aged 22)	40	6	(Qatar Football Association) Al-Shamal SC
	MF	Yaqoob Al-Qasmi	16 February 1990 (aged 16)	0	0	(Oman Football Association) Saham Club
	MF	Sultan Al-Touqi	2 January 1984 (aged 23)	15	3	(Kuwait Football Association) Al-Salmiya SC
	MF	Ahmed Kano	23 February 1985 (aged 21)	31	4	(Qatar Football Association) Al-Rayyan
	MF	Yaqoob Salem Al-Farsi	18 April 1982 (aged 24)	2	0	(Oman Football Association) Sur SC
	MF	Yousuf Shaaban	4 November 1982 (aged 24)	32	3	(Oman Football Association) Dhofar Club
	MF	Ahmed Al-Busafy	1 September 1976 (aged 30)	6	0	(Oman Football Association) Al-Seeb Club
	FW	Amad Al-Hosni	18 July 1984 (aged 22)	37	16	(Qatar Football Association) Qatar SC
	FW	Ismail Al-Ajmi	9 June 1984 (aged 22)	13	5	(Qatar Football Association) Al-Shamal SC
	FW	Hashim Saleh	15 October 1981 (aged 25)	39	12	(Qatar Football Association) Al-Wakrah
	FW	Younis Al-Mushaifri	24 October 1981 (aged 25)	6	0	(Kuwait Football Association) Kazma SC

=== United Arab Emirates ===
Head coach: (France) Bruno Metsu

No.	Pos.	Player	Date of birth (age)	Caps	Goals	Club
	GK	Majed Naser	1 April 1984 (aged 22)	5	0	(United Arab Emirates Football Association) Al Wasl
	DF	Basheer Saeed	28 June 1981 (aged 25)	32	2	(United Arab Emirates Football Association) Al Wahda
	DF	Fahed Masoud	26 December 1980 (aged 26)	42	6	(United Arab Emirates Football Association) Al Wahda
	DF	Abdulrahim Jumaa	23 May 1979 (aged 27)	74	8	(United Arab Emirates Football Association) Al Wahda
	DF	Rashid Abdulrahman	20 October 1975 (aged 31)	9	1	(United Arab Emirates Football Association) Al Jazira
	DF	Adel Abdulaziz	19 June 1980 (aged 26)	6	0	(United Arab Emirates Football Association) Al-Ahli
	DF	Humaid Fakher	3 November 1978 (aged 28)	45	0	(United Arab Emirates Football Association) Al Ain
	DF	Haider Alo Ali	25 December 1979 (aged 27)	39	3	(United Arab Emirates Football Association) Al Wahda
	DF	Saleh Obaid Al-Areefi	8 December 1978 (aged 28)	17	2	(United Arab Emirates Football Association) Al Jazira
	MF	Salem Khamis	19 September 1980 (aged 26)	18	2	(United Arab Emirates Football Association) Al-Ahli
	MF	Helal Saeed	12 May 1977 (aged 29)	11	0	(United Arab Emirates Football Association) Al Ain
	MF	Subait Khater	27 February 1980 (aged 26)	65	9	(United Arab Emirates Football Association) Al Ain
	MF	Nawaf Mubarak	31 August 1981 (aged 25)	27	4	(United Arab Emirates Football Association) Sharjah
	MF	Ali Al-Hawasin	12 December 1979 (aged 27)	16	1	(United Arab Emirates Football Association) Al-Nasr
	MF	Khalid Darwish	17 October 1979 (aged 27)	3	0	(United Arab Emirates Football Association) Al Wasl
	FW	Faisal Khalil	4 December 1982 (aged 24)	40	9	(United Arab Emirates Football Association) Al-Ahli
	FW	Mohammad Omar	11 November 1976 (aged 30)	76	24	(United Arab Emirates Football Association) Al Jazira
	FW	Ismail Matar	7 April 1983 (aged 23)	41	11	(United Arab Emirates Football Association) Al Wahda
	FW	Salem Saad	1 September 1978 (aged 28)	28	2	(United Arab Emirates Football Association) Al Shabab
	FW	Mohamed Rashid Srour	28 September 1978 (aged 28)	24	7	(United Arab Emirates Football Association) Al-Ahli

=== Yemen ===
Head coach: (Egypt) Mohsen Saleh

No.	Pos.	Player	Date of birth (age)	Caps	Goals	Club
	GK	Salem Saeed	1 January 1984 (aged 23)	25	0	(Oman Football Association) Al Nasr
	DF	Hamada Al-Wadi	6 June 1985 (aged 21)	23	0	(Yemen Football Association) Al-Tilal
	DF	Awsam Omar Al-Sayed	5 April 1987 (aged 19)	4	1	(Yemen Football Association) Hassan Abyan
	DF	Zaher Farid Al-Fadhli	6 July 1986 (aged 20)	3	0	(Yemen Football Association) Hassan Abyan
	DF	Mohammed Saleh Salem Al-Zuraqi	1 January 1984 (aged 23)	9	0	(Yemen Football Association) Al Hilal Al Sahili
	MF	Akram Al-Worafi	12 November 1986 (aged 20)	13	1	(Yemen Football Association) Shaab Ibb
	MF	Fadhl Al-Aroomi	13 December 1981 (aged 25)	25	0	(Yemen Football Association) Al-Saqr
	MF	Ali Awad Al-Omqi	2 July 1982 (aged 24)	31	4	(Yemen Football Association) Al-Saqr
	MF	Alaa Al-Sasi	2 July 1987 (aged 19)	3	1	(Yemen Football Association) Al-Ahli
	MF	Essam Awn Al-Dhabani	3 January 1984 (aged 23)	21	0	(Yemen Football Association)
	MF	Saleh Al-Shehri	1 January 1984 (aged 23)	34	3	(Yemen Football Association) Al Hilal Al Sahili
	MF	Mohammed Ali Al-Fadhli		0	0	(Yemen Football Association) Al-Tilal
	MF	Nasser Ghazi	3 May 1981 (aged 25)	10	1	(Yemen Football Association) Al-Wehda
	MF	Ahmed Salem Al-Zuraqi	27 March 1979 (aged 27)	23	0	(Yemen Football Association) Al-Saqr SC
	FW	Ali Al-Nono	7 June 1980 (aged 26)	33	14	(Syrian Football Association) Tishreen
	FW	Fekri Al-Hubaishi	18 April 1978 (aged 28)	10	5	(Yemen Football Association) Shaab Ibb
	FW	Yasser Basuhai	27 March 1979 (aged 27)	20	5	(Yemen Football Association) Al Hilal Al Sahili

== Group B ==
=== Bahrain ===
The squad was announced in January 2007.

Head coach: (Germany) Hans-Peter Briegel

No.	Pos.	Player	Date of birth (age)	Caps	Goals	Club
	GK	Ali Al-Thani	16 August 1971 (aged 35)	31	0	(Bahrain Football Association) Muharraq Club
	DF	Mohamed Husain	31 July 1980 (aged 26)	64	6	(Kuwait Football Association) Kadhima Club
	DF	Abdulla Al-Marzooqi	12 December 1980 (aged 26)	55	8	(Saudi Arabian Football Federation) Al-Ta'ai Club
	MF	Sayed Mahmood Jalal	5 November 1980 (aged 26)	68	4	(Qatar Football Association) Qatar SC
	MF	Rashid Al-Dosari	24 March 1980 (aged 26)	84	4	(Bahrain Football Association) Muharraq Club
	FW	Husain Abdulla Ali	31 December 1981 (aged 25)	84	30	(Qatar Football Association) Umm Salal SC
	MF	Mohamed Salmeen	4 November 1980 (aged 26)	72	8	(Bahrain Football Association) Muharraq Club
	FW	Ismail Abdul-Latif	11 September 1986 (aged 20)	7	0	(Bahrain Football Association) Al-Hala
	MF	Abdulla Baba Fatadi	2 November 1985 (aged 21)	0	0	(Bahrain Football Association) Muharraq Club
	MF	Talal Yousef (c)	24 February 1975 (aged 31)	80	26	(Kuwait Football Association) Al-Kuwait Kaifan
	DF	Salman Isa	11 July 1977 (aged 29)	67	8	(Qatar Football Association) Al-Arabi SC
	DF	Abdullah Omar	1 January 1987 (aged 20)	0	0	(Bahrain Football Association) Muharraq Club
	DF	Sayed Mohamed Adnan	5 February 1983 (aged 23)	38	5	(Qatar Football Association) Al-Khor SC
	MF	Husain Habib	20 December 1982 (aged 24)	26	3	(Bahrain Football Association) Muharraq Club
	MF	Faouzi Mubarak Aaish	27 February 1985 (aged 21)	9	1	(Bahrain Football Association) Muharraq Club
	FW	Jaycee John Okwunwanne	8 October 1985 (aged 21)	1	0	(Bahrain Football Association) Muharraq Club
	MF	Mahmood Abdulrahman	22 November 1984 (aged 22)	3	0	(Bahrain Football Association) Muharraq Club
	DF	Mohamed Hubail	23 June 1981 (aged 25)	39	5	(Bahrain Football Association) Al-Ahli
	FW	A'ala Hubail	25 June 1982 (aged 24)	47	20	(Qatar Football Association) Al-Gharafa
	GK	Abdulrahman Abdulkarim	13 May 1980 (aged 26)	21	0	(Bahrain Football Association) Al-Najma
	GK	Ali Saeed Abdulla	24 September 1979 (aged 27)	21	0	(Bahrain Football Association) Al-Ahli
	MF	Ahmed Hassan Taleb	29 March 1980 (aged 26)	26	5	(Bahrain Football Association) Al-Riffa
	DF	Ismail Saleh	7 September 1985 (aged 21)	2	0	(Bahrain Football Association) Al-Riffa
	DF	Ahmed Matar	29 October 1983 (aged 23)	2	0	(Bahrain Football Association) Al-Riffa
	DF	Ebrahim Al-Mishkhas	7 July 1980 (aged 26)	11	0	(Kuwait Football Association) Al-Arabi SC

=== Iraq ===
Coach: Akram Salman

No.	Pos.	Player	Date of birth (age)	Caps	Goals	Club
	MF	Nashat Akram	12 September 1984 (aged 22)	40	5	(Saudi Arabian Football Federation) Al-Shabab
	MF	Salih Sadir	21 August 1981 (aged 25)	23	5	(Lebanese Football Association) Al-Ansar
	MF	Ahmed Abid Ali	1 January 1986 (aged 21)	0	0	(Iraq Football Association) Al-Zawraa
	FW	Mohammed Nasser	12 March 1984 (aged 22)	11	5	(Cyprus Football Association) Apollon Limassol
	FW	Younis Mahmoud (c)	3 February 1983 (aged 23)	40	22	(Qatar Football Association) Al-Gharafa
	MF	Hawar Mulla Mohammed	1 June 1981 (aged 25)	41	7	(Cyprus Football Association) Apollon Limassol
	MF	Karrar Jassim	11 June 1987 (aged 19)	0	0	(Iraq Football Association) Al-Najaf
	DF	Haidar Abdul-Amir	2 November 1982 (aged 24)	34	3	(Jordan Football Association) Al-Faisaly
	DF	Ali Rehema	8 August 1985 (aged 21)	21	0	(Iraq Football Association) Erbil
	MF	Mahdi Karim	10 December 1983 (aged 23)	31	3	(Cyprus Football Association) Apollon Limassol
	MF	Haitham Kadhim	21 July 1983 (aged 23)	41	0	(Iraq Football Association) Erbil
	GK	Noor Sabri	18 June 1984 (aged 22)	29	0	(Football Federation Islamic Republic of Iran) Mes Kerman
	GK	Mohammed Gassid	10 December 1986 (aged 20)	0	0	(Iraq Football Association) Al-Shorta
	DF	Jassim Mohammed	3 May 1984 (aged 22)	12	0	(Iraq Football Association) Duhok
	FW	Mustafa Karim	21 July 1987 (aged 19)			(Iraq Football Association) Erbil
	DF	Haidar Aboodi	26 March 1986 (aged 20)	0	0	(Iraq Football Association) Al-Najaf
	GK	Sarhang Muhsin	1 January 1986 (aged 21)	5	0	(Iraq Football Association) Erbil
	FW	Emad Mohammed	24 July 1982 (aged 24)	58	16	(Football Federation Islamic Republic of Iran) Sepahan
	FW	Razzaq Farhan	1 July 1977 (aged 29)	57	24	(United Arab Emirates Football Association) Ajman Club
	MF	Yassir Raad	25 June 1983 (aged 23)	23	0	(Iraq Football Association) Erbil
	FW	Ahmad Salah	9 March 1982 (aged 24)	23	4	(Iraq Football Association) Erbil
	DF	Khalid Mushir	14 February 1981 (aged 25)	14	0	(Iraq Football Association) Duhok
	FW	Wissam Zaki	5 August 1986 (aged 20)	14	0	(Iraq Football Association) Erbil
	DF	Ahmed Kadhim	1 July 1976 (aged 30)	53	5	(Football Federation Islamic Republic of Iran) PAS Tehran
	DF	Samal Saeed	1 December 1987 (aged 19)	11	0	(Iraq Football Association) Al-Shorta
	FW	Salih Jaber	28 October 1983 (aged 23)	0	0	(Romanian Football Federation) Universitatea Craiova
	DF	Jassim Ghulam Al-Hamd	1 March 1979 (aged 27)	4	0	(Jordan Football Association) Al-Baqa'a

=== Qatar ===
Head coach: (Bosnia and Herzegovina) Džemaludin Mušović

No.	Pos.	Player	Date of birth (age)	Caps	Goals	Club
	GK	Mohamed Saqr Ahmed	17 May 1981 (aged 25)	28	0	(Qatar Football Association) Al Sadd
	DF	Bilal Mohammed Rajab	2 June 1986 (aged 20)	30	5	(Qatar Football Association) Al-Gharafa
	DF	Ibrahim Al-Ghanim	24 June 1983 (aged 23)	34	0	(Qatar Football Association) Al-Arabi
	DF	Ali Nasser Saleh	18 January 1984 (aged 22)	12	1	(Qatar Football Association) Al Sadd
	DF	Mesaad Al-Hamad	11 February 1986 (aged 20)	3	1	(Qatar Football Association) Al Sadd
	DF	Mustafa Abdi	2 January 1984 (aged 23)	4	0	(Qatar Football Association) Al-Gharafa
	DF	Saad Al-Shammari	6 December 1979 (aged 27)	78	4	(Qatar Football Association) Al-Gharafa
	DF	Abdulla Mohammed Al-Berik	14 February 1984 (aged 22)	7	0	(Qatar Football Association) Al Sadd
	DF	Meshal Mubarak Budawood	5 February 1982 (aged 24)	51	1	(Qatar Football Association) Qatar SC
	MF	Hussein Yasser	9 October 1984 (aged 22)	31	7	(Qatar Football Association) Al-Rayyan
	MF	Wesam Rizik Abdulmajid	5 February 1981 (aged 25)	37	6	(Qatar Football Association) Al Sadd
	MF	Khalfan Ibrahim Al-Khalfan	18 February 1988 (aged 18)	4	2	(Qatar Football Association) Al Sadd
	MF	Majdi Abdulla Siddiq	3 September 1985 (aged 21)	13	1	(Qatar Football Association) Al-Khor
	MF	Magid Mohamed Hassan	1 October 1985 (aged 21)	16	3	(Qatar Football Association) Al Sadd
	MF	Younes Ali Rahmati	3 January 1983 (aged 24)	8	0	(Qatar Football Association) Al Ahli
	FW	Meshal Abdullah	2 May 1984 (aged 22)	20	3	(Qatar Football Association) Al Ahli
	FW	Sebastián Soria	8 November 1983 (aged 23)	2	0	(Qatar Football Association) Qatar SC
	FW	Yousef Ahmed Ali	14 October 1988 (aged 18)	2	0	(Qatar Football Association) Al Sadd

=== Saudi Arabia ===
Head coach: (Brazil) Marcos Paquetá

No.	Pos.	Player	Date of birth (age)	Caps	Goals	Club
	GK	Mohammad Khouja	15 March 1982 (aged 24)	9	0	(Saudi Arabian Football Federation) Al Shabab
	DF	Hussein Abdulghani	21 January 1977 (aged 29)	119	6	(Saudi Arabian Football Federation) Al-Ahli
	DF	Omar Al-Ghamdi	11 April 1979 (aged 27)	60	0	(Saudi Arabian Football Federation) Al Hilal
	DF	Hamad Al-Montashari	22 June 1982 (aged 24)	59	3	(Saudi Arabian Football Federation) Al-Ittihad
	DF	Naif Al-Qadi	3 April 1979 (aged 27)	35	1	(Qatar Football Association) Al-Rayyan
	DF	Saleh Al-Saqri	23 January 1979 (aged 27)	51	1	(Saudi Arabian Football Federation) Al-Ittihad
	DF	Osama Hawsawi	31 March 1984 (aged 22)	3	0	(Saudi Arabian Football Federation) Al Wehda
	MF	Saud Kariri	8 July 1980 (aged 26)	60	3	(Saudi Arabian Football Federation) Al-Ittihad
	MF	Abdoh Otaif	2 April 1984 (aged 22)	14	0	(Saudi Arabian Football Federation) Al Shabab
	MF	Hassan Muath Fallatah	27 January 1986 (aged 20)	11	1	(Saudi Arabian Football Federation) Al Shabab
	MF	Abdulrahman Al-Qahtani	22 May 1983 (aged 23)	2	0	(Saudi Arabian Football Federation) Al-Ettifaq
	MF	Mohammed Ameen	29 April 1980 (aged 26)	23	3	(Saudi Arabian Football Federation) Al-Ittihad
	MF	Khaled Aziz	14 July 1981 (aged 25)	31	1	(Saudi Arabian Football Federation) Al Hilal
	MF	Badr Al-Haqbani	17 January 1979 (aged 28)	7	2	(Saudi Arabian Football Federation) Al Shabab
	MF	Mohammad Massad	17 February 1983 (aged 23)	12	0	(Saudi Arabian Football Federation) Al-Ahli
	FW	Mohammad Al-Shalhoub	8 December 1980 (aged 26)	71	17	(Saudi Arabian Football Federation) Al Hilal
	FW	Yasser Al-Qahtani	10 October 1982 (aged 24)	58	22	(Saudi Arabian Football Federation) Al Hilal
	FW	Malek Mouath	10 August 1981 (aged 25)	7	1	(Saudi Arabian Football Federation) Al-Ahli
	FW	Saleh Bashir Al Dosari	4 September 1982 (aged 24)	11	6	(Saudi Arabian Football Federation) Al-Ettifaq
	FW	Saad Al-Harthi	3 February 1984 (aged 22)	17	3	(Saudi Arabian Football Federation) Al-Nassr
