= List of Qatari football transfers summer 2015 =

This is a list of Qatari football transfers for the 2015 summer transfer window by club. Only transfers of clubs in the Qatar Stars League are included.

Players without a club may join one at any time, either during or in between transfer windows.

== Qatar Stars League ==
=== Al Ahli ===
In: Note: Flags indicate national team as defined under FIFA eligibility rules; some limited exceptions apply. Players may hold more than one non-FIFA nationality.

No.	Pos.	Nation	Player
—	DF	IRN	Pejman Montazeri (from Umm Salal SC)
—	FW	CGO	Firmin Ndombe Mubele (from (Republic of the Congo) AS Vita Club)
—	DF	QAT	Meshal Mubarak (from Al Gharafa)
—	DF	QAT	Abdulrahman Mesbeh (from Qatar SC)
—	MF	QAT	Khalil Sharif (from Umm Salal)
—	MF	QAT	Abdulla Aiesh (from El Jaish)
—	FW	QAT	Taher Al-Bloushi (from Al Rayyan)
—	DF	QAT	Abdul Ghafoor Murad (from Al Rayyan)

Out: Note: Flags indicate national team as defined under FIFA eligibility rules; some limited exceptions apply. Players may hold more than one non-FIFA nationality.

No.	Pos.	Nation	Player
—	DF	IRN	Jalal Hosseini (to (Iran) Naft Tehran)
—	FW	COD	Dioko Kaluyituka (to Al Gharafa)
—	DF	QAT	Mesaad Al-Hamad (to Umm Salal)

=== Al Arabi ===
In: Note: Flags indicate national team as defined under FIFA eligibility rules; some limited exceptions apply. Players may hold more than one non-FIFA nationality.

No.	Pos.	Nation	Player
—	DF	FRA	Rod Fanni (from (France) Marseille)

Out: Note: Flags indicate national team as defined under FIFA eligibility rules; some limited exceptions apply. Players may hold more than one non-FIFA nationality.

No.	Pos.	Nation	Player

=== Al Gharafa ===
In: Note: Flags indicate national team as defined under FIFA eligibility rules; some limited exceptions apply. Players may hold more than one non-FIFA nationality.

No.	Pos.	Nation	Player
—	FW	COD	Dioko Kaluyituka (from Al Ahli)

Out: Note: Flags indicate national team as defined under FIFA eligibility rules; some limited exceptions apply. Players may hold more than one non-FIFA nationality.

No.	Pos.	Nation	Player
—	DF	QAT	Meshal Mubarak (to Al Ahli)
—	MF	BRA	Cícero Santos (released)

=== Al Kharaitiyat ===
In: Note: Flags indicate national team as defined under FIFA eligibility rules; some limited exceptions apply. Players may hold more than one non-FIFA nationality.

No.	Pos.	Nation	Player
—	FW	QAT	Jaralla Al-Marri (on loan from Al Rayyan)

Out: Note: Flags indicate national team as defined under FIFA eligibility rules; some limited exceptions apply. Players may hold more than one non-FIFA nationality.

No.	Pos.	Nation	Player

=== Al Khor ===
In: Note: Flags indicate national team as defined under FIFA eligibility rules; some limited exceptions apply. Players may hold more than one non-FIFA nationality.

No.	Pos.	Nation	Player
—	DF	KOR	Lee Yong (from (South Korea) Jeju United)
—	DF	QAT	Waleed Mohyaden (from Umm Salal)

Out: Note: Flags indicate national team as defined under FIFA eligibility rules; some limited exceptions apply. Players may hold more than one non-FIFA nationality.

No.	Pos.	Nation	Player

=== Al Rayyan ===
In: Note: Flags indicate national team as defined under FIFA eligibility rules; some limited exceptions apply. Players may hold more than one non-FIFA nationality.

No.	Pos.	Nation	Player
—	MF	KOR	Koh Myong-jin (from (South Korea) FC Seoul)
—	MF	ARG	Ulises Pascua (from Al-Shahaniya)
—	FW	QAT	Abdulla Khaled (from Al-Shahaniya)
—	GK	QAT	Khalifa Al-Ammari (from Al-Shahaniya)

Out: Note: Flags indicate national team as defined under FIFA eligibility rules; some limited exceptions apply. Players may hold more than one non-FIFA nationality.

No.	Pos.	Nation	Player
—	FW	QAT	Taher Al-Bloushi (to Al Ahli)
—	DF	QAT	Abdul Ghafoor Murad (to Al Ahli)
—	FW	QAT	Jaralla Al-Marri (on loan to Al Kharaitiyat)
—	DF	ARG	Juan Forlín (released)

=== Al Sailiya ===
In: Note: Flags indicate national team as defined under FIFA eligibility rules; some limited exceptions apply. Players may hold more than one non-FIFA nationality.

No.	Pos.	Nation	Player
—	FW	BRA	Edinho (from (Iran) Tractor Sazi)
—	DF	ROU	Dragoș Grigore (from (France) Toulouse)
—	MF	CMR	Raoul Loé (from (Spain) Osasuna)

Out: Note: Flags indicate national team as defined under FIFA eligibility rules; some limited exceptions apply. Players may hold more than one non-FIFA nationality.

No.	Pos.	Nation	Player

=== Al Wakrah ===
In: Note: Flags indicate national team as defined under FIFA eligibility rules; some limited exceptions apply. Players may hold more than one non-FIFA nationality.

No.	Pos.	Nation	Player
—	FW	ARG	Gastón Sangoy (from Cyprus Apollon Limassol)
—	FW	QAT	Mahir Yousef (on loan from El Jaish)

Out: Note: Flags indicate national team as defined under FIFA eligibility rules; some limited exceptions apply. Players may hold more than one non-FIFA nationality.

No.	Pos.	Nation	Player

=== El Jaish ===
In: Note: Flags indicate national team as defined under FIFA eligibility rules; some limited exceptions apply. Players may hold more than one non-FIFA nationality.

No.	Pos.	Nation	Player

Out: Note: Flags indicate national team as defined under FIFA eligibility rules; some limited exceptions apply. Players may hold more than one non-FIFA nationality.

No.	Pos.	Nation	Player
—	MF	QAT	Abdulla Aiesh (to Al Ahli)
—	FW	QAT	Mohammed Muntari (to Lekhwiya)
—	FW	QAT	Mahir Yousef (on loan to Al Wakrah)

=== Lekhwiya ===
In: Note: Flags indicate national team as defined under FIFA eligibility rules; some limited exceptions apply. Players may hold more than one non-FIFA nationality.

No.	Pos.	Nation	Player
—	FW	QAT	Mohammed Muntari (from El Jaish)

Out: Note: Flags indicate national team as defined under FIFA eligibility rules; some limited exceptions apply. Players may hold more than one non-FIFA nationality.

No.	Pos.	Nation	Player
—	MF	QAT	Abdulla Aiesh (to Al Ahli)

=== Mesaimeer ===
In: Note: Flags indicate national team as defined under FIFA eligibility rules; some limited exceptions apply. Players may hold more than one non-FIFA nationality.

No.	Pos.	Nation	Player
—	MF	IRN	Mohammad Nouri (from (Iran) Persepolis)

Out: Note: Flags indicate national team as defined under FIFA eligibility rules; some limited exceptions apply. Players may hold more than one non-FIFA nationality.

No.	Pos.	Nation	Player

=== Qatar SC ===
In: Note: Flags indicate national team as defined under FIFA eligibility rules; some limited exceptions apply. Players may hold more than one non-FIFA nationality.

No.	Pos.	Nation	Player
—	FW	MAR	Mouhcine Iajour (from (Morocco) Moghreb Tétouan)

Out: Note: Flags indicate national team as defined under FIFA eligibility rules; some limited exceptions apply. Players may hold more than one non-FIFA nationality.

No.	Pos.	Nation	Player
—	DF	QAT	Abdulrahman Mesbeh (to Al Ahli)
—	FW	KOR	Cho Young-Cheol (released)

=== Umm Salal ===
In: Note: Flags indicate national team as defined under FIFA eligibility rules; some limited exceptions apply. Players may hold more than one non-FIFA nationality.

No.	Pos.	Nation	Player
—	MF	IRN	Andranik Teymourian (from (Iran) Tractor Sazi)
—	DF	QAT	Mesaad Al-Hamad (from Al Ahli)

Out: Note: Flags indicate national team as defined under FIFA eligibility rules; some limited exceptions apply. Players may hold more than one non-FIFA nationality.

No.	Pos.	Nation	Player
—	DF	IRN	Pejman Montazeri (to Al Ahli)
—	MF	QAT	Khalil Sharif (to Al Ahli)
—	DF	QAT	Waleed Mohyaden (to Al Khor)
—	MF	EGY	Ahmed Fathy (released)
