= Sarur =

Sarur may refer to:

- Şərur, Azerbaijan
- Sarur, Iran
- Sarur, Karnataka, India
- "Saroor", a song by Indian singer Arjan Dhillon

== See also ==
- Suroor, a name
- Saroornagar, Hyderabad, India
- Aap Kaa Surroor (album), an album by Himesh Reshammiya
- Aap Kaa Surroor, a 2007 Indian film starring Reshammiya
  - Teraa Surroor, its 2016 sequel
