= 2015–16 Al Sadd SC season =

Al Sadd SC
2015–16 season
- Chairman: Muhammed bin Khalifa Al Thani
- Head coach: Hussein Amotta (until November 2015); Jesualdo Ferreira (from 24 November 2015)
- Stadium: Jassim Bin Hamad Stadium
- Qatar Stars League: 3rd
- Emir of Qatar Cup: Runners–up
- Qatar Crown Prince Cup: Semi-finals
- Champions League: Play-off round
- Top goalscorer: League: Hassan Al-Haidos (12 goals); All: Hassan Al-Haidos (15 goals)

In the 2015–16 season, Al Sadd SC is competing in the Qatar Stars League for the 43rd season, as well as the Emir of Qatar Cup the Qatar Crown Prince Cup and the Champions League.

== Squad list ==
Players and squad numbers last updated on 3 September 2021.
Note: Flags indicate national team as has been defined under FIFA eligibility rules. Players may hold more than one non-FIFA nationality.

No.	Nat.	Position	Name	Date of birth (age)	Signed from
Goalkeepers
1	(Qatar)	GK	Saad Al Sheeb	19 February 1990 (aged 25)	(Qatar) Al Sailiya
22	(Qatar)	GK	Muhannad Naim	28 January 1993 (aged 22)	(Belgium) Eupen
53	(Qatar)	GK	Steven Tedga	7 December 1991 (aged 24)	(Qatar) Al-Mesaimeer
Defenders
2	(Portugal)	RB	Pedro Miguel	6 August 1990 (aged 25)	(Qatar) Al Ahli
3	(Qatar)	LB	Abdelkarim Hassan	28 August 1993 (aged 22)	(Qatar) Youth system
5	(Iran)	CB	Morteza Pouraliganji	19 April 1992 (aged 23)	(China) Tianjin Teda
13	(Qatar)	CB	Ibrahim Majid	12 May 1990 (aged 25)	(Qatar) Al Wakrah
29	(Qatar)	RB	Ali Faidh Atashi	24 December 1996 (aged 19)	(Qatar) Youth system
39	(Algeria)	LB	Nadir Belhadj	18 June 1982 (aged 33)	(England) Portsmouth
40	(South Korea)	CB	Lee Jung-Soo	8 January 1980 (aged 35)	(Japan) Kashima Antlers
70	(Qatar)	RB	Musab Kheder	26 September 1993 (aged 22)	(Qatar) Youth system
Midfielders
6	(Spain)	CM / AM / DM	Xavi	25 January 1980 (aged 35)	(Spain) Barcelona
8	(Qatar)	AM	Ali Assadalla	19 January 1993 (aged 22)	(Bahrain) Al Muharraq
14	(Qatar)	AM	Khalfan Ibrahim	18 February 1988 (aged 27)	(Qatar) Al Arabi
15	(Qatar)	CM	Talal Al-Bloushi	22 May 1986 (aged 29)	(Kuwait) Al Naser
20	(Qatar)	DM	Salem Al-Hajri	10 April 1996 (aged 19)	(Belgium) Eupen
27	(Qatar)	CM	Jasser Yahya	19 December 1992 (aged 23)	(Qatar) Youth system
66	(Qatar)	DM	Mohammed Kasola	13 August 1986 (aged 29)	(Qatar) Al-Khor
87	(Qatar)	AM	Nasser Ibrahim Al-Nassr	11 July 1995 (aged 20)	(Qatar) Youth system
Forwards
11	(Brazil)	SS	Muriqui	16 June 1986 (aged 29)	(China) Guangzhou Evergrande
7	(Qatar)		Hamza Sanhaji	22 April 1994 (aged 21)	(Qatar) Youth system
9	(Qatar)		Meshaal Al-Shammeri	19 January 1995 (aged 20)	(Qatar) Youth system
10	(Qatar)	RW	Hassan Al Haidos	11 December 1990 (aged 25)	(Qatar) Youth system
11	(Algeria)	ST	Baghdad Bounedjah	24 November 1991 (aged 24)	(Tunisia) Étoile du Sahel
26	(Libya)		Aladeen Younes	22 January 1996 (aged 19)	(Qatar) Youth system
75	(Qatar)		Hassan Palang	2 April 1998 (aged 17)	(Austria) LASK Linz II

== Competitions ==
=== Overview ===
Competition	Record								Started round	Final position / round	First match	Last match
Competition	G	W	D	L	GF	GA	GD	Win %	Started round	Final position / round	First match	Last match
Qatar Stars League	26	13	8	5	54	38	+16	50.00	Matchday 1	3rd	13 September 2015	15 April 2016
Emir of Qatar Cup	3	2	1	0	8	6	+2	66.67	Quarter-final	Runners–up	7 May 2016	20 May 2016
Qatar Crown Prince Cup	1	0	0	1	2	3	−1	0.00	Semi-finals		25 April 2016	
Champions League	1	0	1	0	2	2	+0	0.00	Play-off round		9 February 2016	
Total	31	15	10	6	66	49	+17	48.39				

Updated to match played 15 April 2016
Source: Competitions

=== Qatar Stars League ===
==== Results summary ====
Overall								Home						Away					
Pld	W	D	L	GF	GA	GD	Pts	W	D	L	GF	GA	GD	W	D	L	GF	GA	GD
26	13	8	5	54	38	+16	47	5	6	2	26	18	+8	8	2	3	28	20	+8

Last updated: 15 April 2016.
Source: Competitive matches

==== Results by round ====
Round	1	2	3	4	5	6	7	8	9	10	11	12	13	14	15	16	17	18	19	20	21	22	23	24	25	26
Ground	A	H	H	A	H	H	A	A	A	H	H	A	A	H	A	A	H	A	A	H	H	H	A	A	H	H
Result	W	D	W	W	W	D	D	W	W	L	L	W	L	W	D	L	D	L	W	W	D	W	W	W	D	D
Position																										

Source: Competitive matches
A = Away; H = Home; W = Win; D = Draw; L = Loss

==== Matches ====
Win Draw Loss

13 September 2015 Round 1	Al-Mesaimeer	0–4	Al Sadd SC	Doha
18:00		Report	Lee Jung-Soo 12'; Muriqui 39', 77', 87'	Stadium: Grand Hamad Stadium; Referee: Khalid Ayed Al Shammari

17 September 2015 Round 2	Al Sadd SC	2–2	Umm Salal	Doha
18:00	Xavi 62'; Kheder 65'	Report	Sagbo 17'; Al Khalfan 84'	Stadium: Jassim Bin Hamad Stadium; Referee: Sultan Al Sufyani

27 September 2015 Round 3	Al Sadd SC	4–1	Al-Wakrah	Doha
18:00	Hassan 31'; Belhadj 60'; Muriqui 69', 86'	Report	Sáez 84'	Stadium: Jassim Bin Hamad Stadium; Referee: Khamis Al Marri

1 October 2015 Round 4	Al-Ahli	1–2	Al Sadd SC	Doha
17:45	Mubele 52'	Report	Xavi 4'; Al Haidos 83'	Stadium: Hamad bin Khalifa Stadium; Referee: Damir Skomina (Slovenia)

18 October 2015 Round 5	Al Sadd SC	2–1	Qatar SC	Doha
17:30	Muriqui 3'; Kasola 53'	Report	Iajour 79'	Stadium: Jassim Bin Hamad Stadium; Referee: Mohamed Khamis Al Kuwari

23 October 2015 Round 6	Al Sadd SC	0–0	Al-Khor	Doha
17:30		Report		Stadium: Jassim Bin Hamad Stadium; Referee: Saoud Al Athbah

31 October 2015 Round 7	Al-Arabi	2–2	Al Sadd SC	Doha
18:45	Paulinho 19', 64'	Report	Hassan 14'; Muriqui 81' (pen.)	Stadium: Abdullah bin Khalifa Stadium; Referee: Viktor Kassai (Hungary)

6 November 2015 Round 8	Al-Gharafa	0–1	Al Sadd SC	Al Rayyan
17:30		Report	Muriqui 54'	Stadium: Thani bin Jassim Stadium; Referee: Salman Ahmed Falahi

22 November 2015 Round 9	Al-Kharaitiyat	2–4	Al Sadd SC	Doha
15:00	Kébé 33', 34'	Report	Majid 17'; Ibrahim 45' (pen.); Hassan 72'; Al Haidos 75'	Stadium: Jassim Bin Hamad Stadium; Referee: Abdulhadi Al Rowaily

27 November 2015 Round 10	Al Sadd SC	2–4	Lekhwiya	Doha
17:30	Belhadj 30', 58'	Report	Muntari 41'; Msakni 57'; Chico 83'; Nam Tae-hee 90' (pen.)	Stadium: Jassim Bin Hamad Stadium; Referee: Fahad Jaber Al Marri

4 December 2015 Round 11	Al Sadd SC	1–2	Al-Sailiya	Doha
15:00	Al Haidos 41'	Report	Bakur 14'; Loé 45'	Stadium: Jassim Bin Hamad Stadium; Referee: Abdulrahman Al Jassim

10 December 2015 Round 12	Al-Rayan	1–2	Al Sadd SC	Doha
17:30	García 22'	Report	Sanhaji 17'; Muriqui 45'	Stadium: Jassim Bin Hamad Stadium; Referee: Milorad Mažić (Serbia)

14 December 2015 Round 13	El-Jaish	4–2	Al Sadd SC	Al Rayyan
17:30	Hamdallah 10', 68'; Rashidov 50'; Romarinho 57'	Report	Al Haidos 18'; Muriqui 33'	Stadium: Thani bin Jassim Stadium; Referee: Abdulrahman Abdou

20 December 2015 Round 14	Al Sadd SC	5–1	Al-Mesaimeer	Doha
17:45	Sanhaji 2'; Al-Shammari 24'; Muriqui 41'; Khalfan 43'; Kasola 51'	Report	Erivelto 83' (pen.)	Stadium: Jassim Bin Hamad Stadium; Referee: Abdulrahman Al Jassim

2 January 2016 Round 15	Umm Salal	1–1	Al Sadd SC	Doha
15:15	Welinton 45'	Report	Khalfan 37'	Stadium: Hamad bin Khalifa Stadium; Referee: Khamis Al Marri

28 January 2016 Round 16	Al-Wakrah	3–1	Al Sadd SC	Al Wakrah
18:00	Sáez 10', 85'; Bakur 58'	Report	Al Haidos 41'	Stadium: Saoud bin Abdulrahman Stadium; Referee: Stefan Kovacs (Romania)

4 February 2016 Round 17	Al Sadd SC	1–1	Al-Ahli	Doha
18:15	Assadalla 87'	Report	Abdulla 70' (pen.)	Stadium: Jassim Bin Hamad Stadium; Referee: Mohamed Khamis Al Kuwari

14 February 2016 Round 18	Qatar SC	1–0	Al Sadd SC	Doha
18:15	Emiliano 80' (pen.)	Report		Stadium: Suheim Bin Hamad Stadium; Referee: Khamis Al Marri

19 February 2016 Round 19	Al-Khor	1–3	Al Sadd SC	Al Khor
15:45	Mohyaden 90'	Report	Al Haidos 36' (pen.), 80'; Sanhaji 73'	Stadium: Al-Khor SC Stadium; Referee: Salman Ahmed Falahi

28 February 2016 Round 20	Al Sadd SC	3–1	Al-Arabi	Doha
18:30	Kheder 20'; Pouraliganji 30'; Al Haidos 74'	Report	Nekounam 49'	Stadium: Abdullah bin Khalifa Stadium; Referee: Milorad Mažić (Serbia)

7 March 2016 Round 21	Al Sadd SC	1–1	Al-Gharafa	Doha
18:30	Al-Shammari 16'	Report	Weiss 20'	Stadium: Jassim Bin Hamad Stadium; Referee: Salman Ahmed Falahi

11 March 2016 Round 22	Al Sadd SC	1–0	Al-Kharaitiyat	Doha
17:00	Bounedjah 80'	Report		Stadium: Suheim Bin Hamad Stadium; Referee: Saoud Al Athbah

20 March 2016 Round 23	Lekhwiya	2–3	Al Sadd SC	Doha
17:00	Boudiaf 16'; Mohammad 85'	Report	Al Haidos 5', 42' (pen.); Hassan 87'	Stadium: Jassim Bin Hamad Stadium; Referee: Abdulrahman Abdou

2 April 2016 Round 24	Al-Sailiya	2–3	Al Sadd SC	Doha
18:15	Aaish 28' (pen.), 44' (pen.)	Report	Al Haidos 45'; Bounedjah 49'; Pouraliganji 70'	Stadium: Hamad bin Khalifa Stadium; Referee: Saoud Al Athbah

10 April 2016 Round 25	Al Sadd SC	2–2	Al-Rayan	Doha
20:30	Al Haidos 89'; Kasola 90'	Report	García 55', 71'	Stadium: Jassim Bin Hamad Stadium; Referee: Salman Ahmed Falahi

15 April 2016 Round 26	Al Sadd SC	2–2	El-Jaish	Doha
18:15	Xavi 57'; Bounedjah 58'	Report	Hamdallah 12'; Lucas Mendes 78'	Stadium: Suheim Bin Hamad Stadium; Referee: Mohamed Khamis Al Kuwari

== Emir of Qatar Cup ==
7 May 2016 Quarter-finals	Al-Gharafa	2–3	Al Sadd SC	Doha
21:00	Abdi 42'; Weiss 75'		Bounedjah 9', 64'; Al Haidos 40'	Stadium: Grand Hamad Stadium; Referee: Mohamed Khamis Al Kuwari
Note: Lineup for Al Sadd SC - , , , , , , , , , , ( ’) ( ’)

13 May 2016 Semi-finals	Al-Rayan	2–3	Al Sadd SC	Doha
17:30	Tabata 12', (penalty missed) 88', 90+4' (pen.)		Al Haidos 19' (pen.), 21'; Bounedjah 90'	Stadium: Jassim Bin Hamad Stadium; Attendance: 7,500; Referee: Abdulrahman Al Jassim
Note: Lineup for Al Sadd SC - , , , , , , , , , , ( ’) ( ’)

20 May 2016 Final	Al Sadd SC	2–2 (a.e.t.) (2–4 p)	Lekhwiya	Doha
19:00	Bounedjah 61'; Hassan 67'		Chic 70'; Nam Tae-hee 77'	Stadium: Jassim Bin Hamad Stadium; Referee: Salman Ahmed Falahi
	Penalties
	Xavi (penalty scored); Khalfan Ibrahim (penalty missed); Nadir Belhadj (penalty missed); Ibrahim Majid (penalty scored)		(penalty scored) Dioko Kaluyituka; (penalty scored) Luiz Júnior; (penalty scored) Chico; (penalty scored) Nam Tae-hee

== Qatar Cup (ex) Crown Prince Cup ==
25 April 2016 Semi-finals	El Jaish	3–2	Al Sadd SC	Doha
	Al-Haydos 33' (o.g.); Romarinho 55'; Hamdallah 72' (pen.)		Ababacar Ndiaye 36' (o.g.); Pouraliganji 88'	Stadium: Jassim Bin Hamad Stadium

== AFC Champions League ==
=== Play-off round ===
9 February 2016	Al-Jazira (United Arab Emirates)	2–2 (a.e.t.) (5–4 p)	(Qatar) Al Sadd SC	Abu Dhabi
20:15 UTC+4	Jones 45'; Mabkhout 65'	Report	Sanhaji 22', 88'	Stadium: Mohammed Bin Zayed Stadium; Attendance: 13,340; Referee: Ravshan Irmatov (Uzbekistan)
	Penalties
	Mabkhout (penalty scored); Juma (penalty scored); Rashid (penalty missed); Al-Shamsi (penalty scored); Neves (penalty missed); Park Jong-woo (penalty scored); Mousa (penalty scored)		(penalty missed) Xavi; (penalty scored) Al-Haidos; (penalty scored) Pedro Miguel; (penalty missed) Pouraliganji; (penalty scored) Belhadj; (penalty scored) Hassan; (penalty missed) Sanhaji

== Squad information ==
=== Playing statistics ===
No.	Pos	Nat	Player	Total		Qatar Stars League		Emir of Qatar Cup		AFC CL1		Other	
No.	Pos	Nat	Player	Apps	Goals	Apps	Goals	Apps	Goals	Apps	Goals	Apps	Goals
Goalkeepers
1	GK	(Qatar) QAT	Saad Al Sheeb	17	0	15	0	1	0	1	0	0	0
22	GK	(Qatar) QAT	Muhannad Naim	11	0	11	0	0	0	0	0	0	0
53	GK	(Qatar) QAT	Steven Tedga	1	0	1	0	0	0	0	0	0	0
Defenders
2	DF	(Portugal) POR	Pedro Miguel	8	0	6	0	1	0	1	0	0	0
3	DF	(Qatar) QAT	Abdelkarim Hassan	23	5	21	4	1	1	1	0	0	0
5	DF	(Iran) IRI	Morteza Pouraliganji	10	2	8	2	1	0	1	0	0	0
13	DF	(Qatar) QAT	Ibrahim Majid	14	1	13	1	1	0	0	0	0	0
20	DF	(Qatar) QAT	Salem Al-Hajri	10	0	9	0	1	0	0	0	0	0
29	DF	(Qatar) QAT	Mohammed Itshi	2	0	2	0	0	0	0	0	0	0
39	DF	(Algeria) ALG	Nadir Belhadj	28	3	26	3	1	0	1	0	0	0
40	DF	(South Korea) KOR	Lee Jung-Soo	11	1	11	1	0	0	0	0	0	0
66	DF	(Qatar) QAT	Mohammed Kasola	23	3	23	3	0	0	0	0	0	0
70	DF	(Qatar) QAT	Musab Kheder	17	2	16	2	0	0	1	0	0	0
87	DF	(Qatar) QAT	Nasser Ibrahim	12	0	12	0	0	0	0	0	0	0
Midfielders
6	MF	(Spain) ESP	Xavi	26	3	24	3	1	0	1	0	0	0
8	MF	(Qatar) QAT	Ali Assadalla	21	1	19	1	1	0	1	0	0	0
14	MF	(Qatar) QAT	Khalfan Ibrahim	21	3	19	3	1	0	1	0	0	0
15	MF	(Qatar) QAT	Talal Al-Bloushi	18	0	17	0	0	0	1	0	0	0
27	MF	(Qatar) QAT	Jasser Yahya	14	0	13	0	0	0	1	0	0	0
87	MF	(Qatar) QAT	Saoud Ibrahim Al-Nassr	12	0	12	0	0	0	0	0	0	0
Forwards
7	FW	(Qatar) QAT	Hamza Sanhaji	12	5	11	3	0	0	1	2	0	0
9	FW	(Qatar) QAT	Meshaal Al-Shammeri	13	2	12	2	0	0	1	0	0	0
10	MF	(Qatar) QAT	Hassan Al-Haidos	27	12	25	12	1	0	1	0	0	0
11	FW	(Algeria) ALG	Baghdad Bounedjah	7	4	6	3	1	1	0	0	0	0
26	FW	(Libya) LBA	Aladeen Younes	1	0	1	0	0	0	0	0	0	0
75	FW	(Qatar) QAT	Hassan Palang	1	0	1	0	0	0	0	0	0	0
Players transferred out during the season
11	FW	(Brazil) BRA	Muriqui	16	11	16	11	0	0	0	0	0	0

Last updated: 26 January 2021
Source: fr.soccerway.com

=== Goalscorers ===
Includes all competitive matches. The list is sorted alphabetically by surname when total goals are equal.

No.	Nat.	Player	Pos.	QSL	QEC	CPC	CL 1	TOTAL
10	(Qatar)	Hassan Al-Haidos	FW	12	3	0	0	15
11	(Brazil)	Muriqui	FW	11	0	0	0	11
11	(Algeria)	Baghdad Bounedjah	FW	3	4	0	0	7
7	(Qatar)	Hamza Sanhaji	FW	3	0	0	2	5
3	(Qatar)	Abdelkarim Hassan	DF	4	1	0	0	5
14	(Qatar)	Khalfan Ibrahim	MF	3	0	0	0	3
6	(Spain)	Xavi	MF	3	0	0	0	3
39	(Algeria)	Nadir Belhadj	DF	3	0	0	0	3
66	(Qatar)	Mohammed Kasola	MF	3	0	0	0	3
5	(Iran)	Morteza Pouraliganji	DF	2	0	1	0	3
9	(Qatar)	Meshaal Al-Shammeri	FW	2	0	0	0	2
70	(Qatar)	Musab Kheder	DF	2	0	0	0	2
8	(Qatar)	Ali Assadalla	MF	1	0	0	0	1
13	(Qatar)	Ibrahim Majid	DF	1	0	0	0	1
40	(South Korea)	Lee Jung-Soo	DF	1	0	0	0	1
Own Goals				0	0	1	0	0
Totals				54	8	2	2	66

Players with Multiple Nationalities

- (Qatar) (Nigeria) Steven Tedga
- (Qatar) (Ghana) Mohammed Kasola
- (Qatar) (Palestine) Ibrahim Majid
- (Qatar) (Sudan) Musab Keder
- (Qatar) (Sudan) Abdelkarim Hassan
- (Qatar) (Kuwait) Talal Al-Bloushi
- (Qatar) (Iran) Hussain Ali Bahzad
- (Qatar) (Bahrain) Ali Asad
- (Qatar) (Morocco) Hamza Sanhaji

For recent squad changes see List of Qatari football transfers summer 2015.

== Transfers ==
=== In ===
Date	Pos	Player	From club	Transfer fee	Source
29 April 2015	FW	(Algeria) Baghdad Bounedjah	(Tunisia) Étoile du Sahel	Undisclosed	
21 May 2015	MF	(Spain) Xavi	(Spain) Barcelona	Free transfer	
8 January 2016	DF	(Iran) Morteza Pouraliganji	(China) Tianjin Teda	Free transfer	
1 February 2016	DF	(Portugal) Pedro Miguel	Al Ahli	Free transfer	

=== Out ===
Date	Pos	Player	To club	Transfer fee	Source
1 April 2016	FW	(Brazil) Muriqui	(Japan) FC Tokyo	Loan for one season	
