= Suroor =

Suroor is a surname. Notable people with the surname include:

- Ayiman Suroor Al-Maawali (born 1980), known as Ayiman Suroor, Omani footballer
- Suroor Barabankvi (1919–1980), Pakistani Urdu poet and lyricist
- Mohammed Suroor Sabban (1898–1971), politician, economist, publisher, and poet from Saudi Arabia
- Ale Ahmad Suroor, Urdu poet, critic and professor from India
- Elaha Suroor (born 1988), Hazara pop singer
- Majed Suroor (born 1997), Emirati association football player
- Mohamed Suroor (born 1993), Emirati footballer
- Saeed bin Suroor (born 1968), horse racing trainer
- Shahin Suroor (born 1996), Emirati footballer

== See also ==
- Sorour
- Surir
- Surur
