= Al-Shuaibi =

Al-Shuaibi (Arabic: الشعيبي) is an Arabic surname that denotes a relationship to Shuaib, a prophet of the Quran. Notable people with the surname include:

- Amjad Al-Shuaibi (born 1979), Jordanian footballer of Palestinian origin
- Haya Al Shuaibi (born 1979), Saudi comedian actress
