= Zemskov =

Zemskov (Russian: Земсков) is a surname. Notable people with the surname include:

- Mikhail Zemskov (born 1994), Russian footballer
- Viktor Zemskov (1946–2015), Russian historian

== See also ==
- Ýewgeniý Zemskow (born 1982), Turkmen footballer
