= Omar Abdulrazaq =

Syrian footballer (born 1987)

Omar Abdulrazaq عمر عبد الرزاق
Personal information
- Date of birth: March 12, 1987 (age 39)
- Place of birth: Syria
- Height: 1.76 m (5 ft 9 1/2 in)
- Position: Midfielder

Youth career
- Tishreen SC

Senior career*
Years	Team	Apps	(Gls)
2007–2011	Tishreen SC		
2011–2012	Al-Niddal		
2012	Al-Jalil	10	(3)
2012	Shabab Al-Hussein	9	(0)
2013	May 22 San'a'		
2013	Ein Karem		
2014	Sitra Club		
- * Club domestic league appearances and goals as of 22 March 2012 ‡ National team caps and goals as of 22 March 2012

Omar Abdulrazaq (Arabic: عمر عبد الرزاق) (born March 12, 1987, in Syria) is a football player who is currently playing for Sitra Club in the Bahraini Premier League.
