= Ayman Abu Fares =

Jordanian footballer

Personal information
- Full name: Ayman Mahmoud awwad Abu Fares
- Date of birth: January 29, 1988 (age 38)
- Place of birth: Amman, Jordan
- Height: 1.87 m (6 ft 2 in)
- Position: Striker

Team information
- Current team: Shabab Al-Aqaba

Youth career
- 2005: Shabab Al-Hussein

Senior career*
Years	Team	Apps	(Gls)
2006–2014	Shabab Al-Hussein		
2009–2010	→ Shabab Al-Ordon (loan)		
2010–2011	→ Al-Yarmouk FC (loan)		
2012	→ Al-Jazeera (Amman) (loan)		
2014–2017	Al-Sareeh SC		
2017	Shabab Al-Aqaba		
2017-2018	Al-Baqa'a		

International career
2006–2007	Jordan U-20		
- * Club domestic league appearances and goals

Ayman Awwad Mahmoud Abu Fares (Arabic: أيمن عواد محمود أبو فارس; born January 29, 1988) is a Jordanian retired footballer.
