= Surur =

Surur (Arabic: سرور, lit. Joy) can refer to several things:

== People ==
- Surur (qiyan) (c. 1193), singer and concubine at the Ayyubid court in Egypt.
- Surur ibn Musa'id (1754–1788), Sharif of Mecca (1773–1788)
- Yahya ibn Surur (d. 1838), Sharif of Mecca (1813–1827)
- Surur Hoda (1928–2003), Indian politician.
- Eliaba James Surur (1930–2014), Sudanese politician.
- Naguib Surur (1932–1978), Egyptian poet.
- Ahmad Fathi Sorour (1932–2024), Egyptian politician.
- Muhammad Surur (1938–2016), Syrian cleric credited with founding the Sururiya, a politicized brand of Salafism.
- Mohamed Sourour (1940–2022), Moroccan boxer.

== Places ==
- Surur (village)

== Other ==
- Nazl el sourour, 1974 playwright by Lebanese composer Ziad Rahbani.
- Sahwa movement, also called Sururism or Sururiya after its founder, the Syrian Salafi cleric Mohamed Surur (1938–2016).
