= Sorour =

Sorour is a surname. Notable people with the surname include:

- Ahmad Fathi Sorour (1932–2024), Egyptian politician
- Faisal Sorour (born 1996), Kuwaiti Paralympic athlete
- Mashallah Amin Sorour (1931–2010), Iranian cyclist

== See also ==
- Sorouri
