= Abdullah Abu Zaitoun =

Jordanian footballer

Personal information
- Date of birth: 17 September 1991 (age 35)
- Place of birth: Irbid, Jordan
- Position: Midfielder

Youth career
- 2005–2010: Al-Hussein

Senior career*
Years	Team	Apps	(Gls)
2010–2017	Al-Hussein		
2013	→ Shabab Al-Hussein (loan)		
2017–2019	Al-Ramtha		
2019–2020	That Ras		
2020	Ma'an		

International career^{‡}
2009–2010	Jordan U-19		
2012	Jordan U-22		
2014	Jordan	1	(0)
- * Club domestic league appearances and goals ‡ National team caps and goals as of 6 June 2014

Abdullah Abu Zaitoun (Arabic: عبد الله أبو زيتون; born 17 September 1991) is a Jordanian professional footballer who plays as a midfielder.
