= Mukaya Payam =

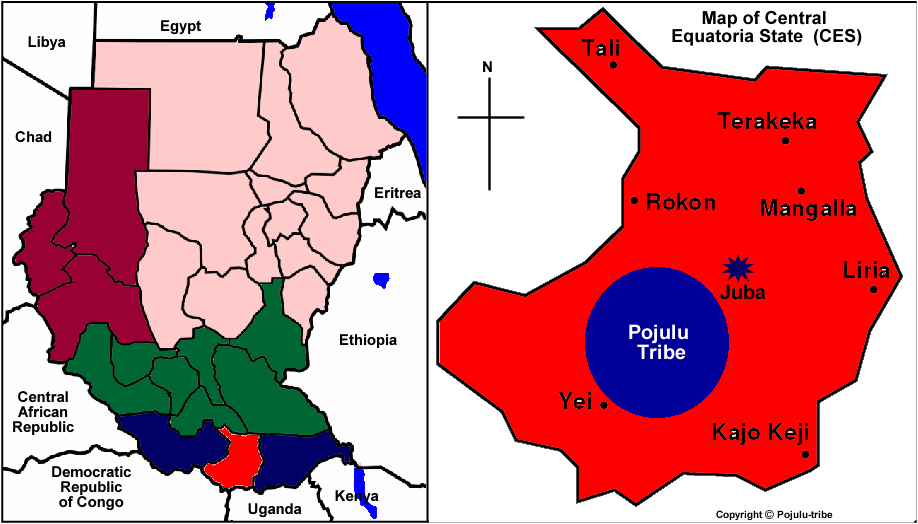
Geographical location of the Mukaya Payam within Pojulu Environment

Mukaya Payam is situated in Lainya County in central Equatoria State, South Sudan. It was a former local administrator head for the current Yei River County. The name (Mukaya) originated from a hill located about in the center of the Mukaya geographical land, which is around 9 to 12 miles north of Yei River County. The Mukaya differentiates into smaller clans of Dimo (1), Dimo (2), Dimo na Godo, Rume, Kendire, Goromba, Mingale, Jolobong, Mijikango, Dongbong, Pisak, Piyasuk, Bori, Yondoru, Sowaka, Ligi, Girim, Yensot, Migibura, Bono, Muresuku, Morsak, Gokoni, Malari, Worokosuk, Bujang, Mika, Warijang, Gori, Kobo, Nyori, Morsak, Bonga, Mikatom, Jubor, and a few other smaller ones. The population of the Mukaya Payam is estimated to be 15,000 persons.

== Mukaya Bomas ==
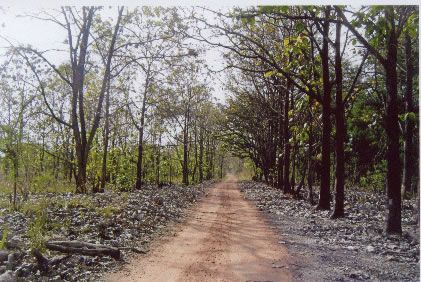
Mukaya Payam road to the west (Mukaya)

== Environment, economy and natural resources ==
The environment in Mukaya Payam is typically tropical but the weather regime is fast changing; becoming arid with less rain and long dry spells. Mukaya economy is predominantly agrarian. Locally Mukaya Payam contributes 10% of food to the Yei river county economy. The majority of people are peasant practicing mixed farming; subsistence agriculture in which the main crops are cassava, sorghum, maize, simsim, groundnut, cow peas etc. The people in Mukaya Payam keeps goats, sheep and few cattle but the prevalence of tsetse fly has rendered cattle herding difficult. There are thick local forests around the hill of Mukaya which is the reason for the tsetse fly's existence. Beside the local thick forests there is also agro forestry.

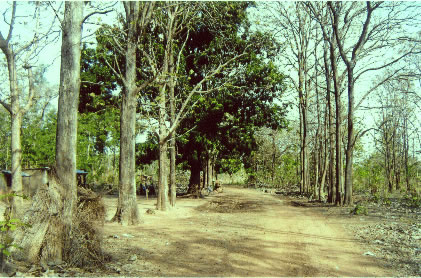
Mukaya Payam road to the east (Juba Rd)

== Mythology and history ==
Mukaya is original known to current Pojulu of Mukaya Payam, the people and their relation to the Bari and other Bari-speaking ethnic communities in Central Equatoria State, South Sudan.

== Education ==
List of schools in Mukaya Payam

Names	payam
Dimo (1) Primary	Mukaya
Dimo II Primary	Mukaya
Komoyi Primary	Mukaya
Mambule Primary	Mukaya
Roronyo Primary	Mukaya
Yondoru Primary	Mukaya
Soka primary	Mukaya

== Economic activities ==
Subsistence agriculture is the main economic activity in the Payam, as is the case with most South Sudan payams.

== See also ==
- Central Equatoria
- James Elioba Sururu
- Lainya county
- Pojulu Tribe
- Yei, South Sudan
