= Ahmad Al Subaih =

Kuwaiti footballer

Personal information
- Full name: Ahmad Subaih Al Shammari
- Date of birth: October 6, 1980 (age 46)
- Place of birth: Kuwait City, Kuwait
- Height: 1.75 m (5 ft 9 in)
- Position: Defender

Senior career*
Years	Team	Apps	(Gls)
2000–2014	Al Kuwait		
Total		?	(?)

International career^{‡}
2004–2007	Kuwait	11	(0)
- * Club domestic league appearances and goals as of November 5, 2010 ‡ National team caps and goals as of November 5, 2010

Ahmad Al Subaih (Arabic: أحمد الصبيح, born 6 October 1980) pronounced as (AlSObeeeh) is a Kuwaiti footballer who is a defender for the Kuwaiti Premier League club Al Kuwait.
