= Abdulrahman Mussa =

Kuwaiti footballer

abdulrahman Mussa
Personal information
- Date of birth: December 4, 1981 (age 44)
- Place of birth: Kuwait City, Kuwait
- Height: 1.76 m (5 ft 9 1/2 in)
- Position: Midfielder

Senior career*
| Years | Team | Apps | (Gls) |
| 2003–2008 | Qadsia SC | | |
| 2008–2011 | Al-Naser | | |
| 2011–2014 | Al Salmiyah | | |

International career
| 2003–2005 | Kuwait | | |
- * Club domestic league appearances and goals

Abdulrahman Mussa is a Kuwaiti football midfielder who played for Kuwait in the 2004 AFC Asian Cup.
