= Amjad Al-Shuaibi =

Jordanian footballer

Personal information
- Full name: Amjad Tawfiq Al-Shuaibi
- Date of birth: August 29, 1979 (age 47)
- Place of birth: Saudi Arabia
- Position: Midfielder

Senior career*
Years	Team	Apps	(Gls)
1996–2006	Shabab Al-Hussein		
2002	Al-Ittihad		
2006–2007	Al-Nasr		(1)
2007–2009	Shabab Al-Hussein		
2009–2012	Al-Jazeera (Amman)		
2012–2013	Al-Yarmouk FC		
2013–2014	Al-Ramtha SC		
2014–2015	Al Hazm		(7)
2015–2016	Al-Baqa'a SC		

International career
1997	Jordan U20		
2005–2007	Jordan	14	(0)
- * Club domestic league appearances and goals

Amjad Tawfiq Al-Shuaibi is a Jordanian retired footballer.
