= Abdulaziz Ali =

Qatari footballer (born 1980)

Personal information
- Full name: Abdulaziz Ali Abdulla
- Date of birth: June 5, 1980 (age 46)
- Place of birth: Doha, Qatar
- Height: 1.78 m (5 ft 10 in)
- Position: Goalkeeper

Youth career
- 1996–1998: Al-Gharafa

Senior career*
Years	Team	Apps	(Gls)
1998-2018	Al-Gharafa	135	(0)
2018-2020	Muaither SC	0	(0)
Total		135	(0)

International career^{‡}
2004–2010	Qatar	7	(0)
- * Club domestic league appearances and goals as of December 10, 2006 ‡ National team caps and goals as of December 10, 2006

Abdulaziz Ali (born June 5, 1980) is a Qatari footballer. He currently plays as a goalkeeper for Muaither.

Ali is also a member of the Qatar national football team.

== Career ==
Ali joined the youth team of Al-Gharafa in 1996. He joined the first team in 1998, and was the second choice goalkeeper, behind legendary Qatari international Amer Al Kaabi. Three years later he was promoted to the first choice goalkeeper. He gradually dropped to the reserve team in the 2009/10 season.
