= Abdulla Al-Berik =

Qatari footballer (born 1984)

Personal information
- Full name: Abdulla Mohammed Al-Berik
- Date of birth: February 14, 1984 (age 42)
- Place of birth: Qatar
- Height: 1.82 m (5 ft 11 1/2 in)
- Position: Defender

Senior career*
Years	Team	Apps	(Gls)
2002–2007	Al Sadd	56	(1)
2007–2008	Al Khor	7	(0)
2008–2009	Umm Salal	19	(0)
2009–2010	Al Khor	11	(0)
2010–2011	Al-Sailiya	15	(1)
2011–2012	Al Ahli	9	(0)
2012–2013	Al Sadd	1	(0)

International career^{‡}
2006–2007	Qatar	6	(0)
- * Club domestic league appearances and goals as of 29/12/2011 ‡ National team caps and goals as of 29/12/2011

Abdulla Al-Berik (born February 14, 1984) is a Qatari footballer. He is a former member of the Qatar national football team.

== Career ==
He played six times for the Qatar national football team between 2006 and 2007.

=== Club career statistics ===
Statistics accurate as of 1 January 2012

Club	Season	League	League		Reserve League		League Cup^{2}		Continental^{3}		Total	
Club	Season	League	Apps	Goals	Apps	Goals	Apps	Goals	Apps	Goals	Apps	Goals
Al-Sadd	2001–02	QSL	1	0	0	0						
Al-Sadd	2004–05	QSL	22	1	0	0						
Al-Sadd	2005–06	QSL	18	0	0	0						
Al-Sadd	2006–07	QSL	15	0	6	0						
Total		QSL	56	1	6	0						
Al Khor	2007–08	QSL	7	0	2	0						
Umm Salal	2008–09	QSL	19	0	0	0						
Al Khor	2009–10	QSL	11	0	9	1						
Al-Sailiya	2010–11	QSL	15	1	8	0						
Al Ahli	2011–12	QSL	4	0	0	0						
Career total			112	2	25	1						

^{2}Includes Sheikh Jassem Cup.

^{3}Includes AFC Champions League.
