= Mohamed Jaffar =

Bahraini footballer (born 1979)

Personal information
- Full name: Mohammed Jaffar Ali Ahmed Al-Zain
- Date of birth: 13 November 1979 (age 47)
- Height: 1.85 m (6 ft 1 in)
- Position: Striker

Senior career*
Years	Team	Apps	(Gls)
2000–2008	Al-Muharraq		
2008–2015	Al-Shabab		

International career
2001–2004	Bahrain	13	(0)
- * Club domestic league appearances and goals

Mohammed Jaffar Ali Ahmed Al-Zain (born 13 November 1979) is a Bahraini former footballer who played as a striker for Bahrain in the 2004 AFC Asian Cup.
