= Alaa' Matalqa =

Jordanian footballer

Personal information
- Full name: Alaa' Hassan Matalqa
- Date of birth: October 12, 1982 (age 44)
- Place of birth: Amman, Jordan
- Height: 1.73 m (5 ft 8 in)
- Position: Left back

Senior career*
Years	Team	Apps	(Gls)
2000–2008	Shabab Al-Hussein		(9)
2007	Al-Jazeera		(1)
2008–2012	Al-Faisaly		(5)
2012–2014	Shabab Al-Ordon		(2)
2014–2015	Al-Wehdat SC		
2015–2016	Al-Hussein		
2016–2017	Al-Salt SC		
2017–2018	Shabab Al-Hussein		

International career
2002-2003	Jordan U23		
2002–2010	Jordan	37	(1)
- * Club domestic league appearances and goals

Alaa' Hassan Matalqa is a retired Jordanian footballer.

== International career ==
Matalqa's last match with the Jordan national team was against Azerbaijan in an international friendly in Amman on 5 February 2010, which resulted in a 2–0 victory for Azerbaijan.

== Honors and Participation in International Tournaments ==
=== In AFC Asian Cups ===
- 2004 Asian Cup

=== In WAFF Championships ===
- 2004 WAFF Championship
- 2007 WAFF Championship
- 2008 WAFF Championship

== International goals ==
#	Date	Venue	Opponent	Score	Result	Competition
1	March 22, 2008	Tashkent	Uzbekistan	4-1	Loss	Friendly
