= Gader Mousa =

Qatari footballer (born 1982)

Personal information
- Date of birth: 10 September 1982 (age 44)
- Place of birth: Qatar
- Position: Midfielder

Senior career*
| Years | Team | Apps | (Gls) |
| 2003–2005 | Al Shamal | | |

International career
| 2004 | Qatar | 1 | (0) |
- * Club domestic league appearances and goals

Gader Mousa is a Qatari football midfielder who played for Qatar in the 2004 Asian Cup. He also played for Al Shamal Amil.
