= Selman Mesbeh =

Qatari footballer (born 1980)

Personal information
- Date of birth: 27 August 1980 (age 46)
- Place of birth: Qatar
- Position: Defender

Senior career*
Years	Team	Apps	(Gls)
1998–2010	Al-Rayyan SC	202	(2)
2009–2010	Umm Salal SC	4	(0)
2010–2013	Qatar SC	18	(0)
2013–2015	Muaither SC		

International career
2000–2008	Qatar	28	(0)
- * Club domestic league appearances and goals

Selman Mesbeh (Arabic:سلمان مصباح) is a Qatari football defender who played for Qatar in the 2004 Asian Cup. He also played for Al Rayyan, Umm Salal, Qatar SC.
