= Hassan Al Mosawi =

Bahraini footballer

Hassan Ali Al-Mosawi (born 21 September 1984) is a Bahraini former footballer who played as a defender for Bahrain in the 2004 AFC Asian Cup. He played club football for Riffa SC and Manama Club.
