= Eliaba James Surur =

Sudanese politician

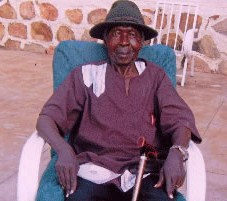
- Born: November 21, 1930; Mukaya Payam
- Died: August 17, 2014 (aged 83); Kampala, Uganda

Eliaba James Surur (21 November 1930 Mongalla - 17 August 2014 Kampala) was a politician in Sudan. He was the founder and chairman of the now defunct political party, Union of Sudan African Parties 2 (USAP)

Surur was born in Mukaya Payam in Lainya County in Central Equatoria State. He is a member of the Pojulu tribe. He was a secondary school teacher before becoming a politician. Elioba was a participant in the First Sudanese Civil War, fighting with the Anyanya movement from 1955 to 1972. He also fought in the Second Sudanese Civil War on the side of the Sudan People's Liberation Army (SPLA) from 1983 to 2005. He was a leader of the Union of Sudan African Parties before splintering off to form the USAP 2.

== Union of Sudan African Parties 2 ==
Surur founded the party in 1984. After the signing of the Comprehensive Peace Agreement in Nairobi, Kenya, the party supported the Sudan People's Liberation Army/Movement (SPLA/M) in their vision of a new Sudan. The USAP represented the main support to the government during 21 years and therefore they played a major role in resolving the conflict through participating in the peacemaking and peace-building processes of the Comprehensive Peace Agreement. Before it was dissolved, the party was represented by four seats in the government of South Sudan.

During July 2010, Surur announced that the Union of Sudan African Parties 2 would become part of the Sudan People's Liberation Movement. His explanation for the merge was a desire for Southern Sudan to be united for the upcoming Southern Sudanese independence referendum scheduled for January 2011.

== See also ==
- Pojulu Tribe
- Sudan Political Parties
