= Ali Talib Al-Ajmi =

Omani footballer (born 1984)

Ali Talib
Personal information
- Full name: Ali Talib Salman Al-Ajmi
- Date of birth: 14 November 1984 (age 41)
- Place of birth: Oman
- Position: Goalkeeper

Senior career*
| Years | Team | Apps | (Gls) |
| 2001–2002 | Sohar | ? | (?) |
| 2003–2006 | Sur | ? | (?) |
| 2007–2009 | Sohar | ? | (?) |
| 2009–2011 | Al-Nahda | ? | (?) |
| 2011–2012 | Al-Seeb | ? | (?) |

International career
| 2004– | Oman | 2 | (0) |
- * Club domestic league appearances and goals

Ali Talib Salman Al-Ajmi commonly known as Ali Talib (Arabic: علي طالب سلمان العجمي; born 14 November 1984) is an Omani former footballer who last played as a goalkeeper for Al-Seeb Club in the Oman Elite League.

== International career ==
Ali was selected for the national team for the first time in 2004. He has represented the national team in the 2004 AFC Asian Cup and the 2006 FIFA World Cup qualification. He was the third substitute goalkeeper for Oman throughout the 2004 AFC Asian Cup qualification and 2004 AFC Asian Cup due to the presence of Ali Al-Habsi and Sulaiman Al Mazroui.

== Honours ==
=== Club ===
- With Sur

- Sultan Qaboos Cup (0): Runners-up 2006

- With Al-Nahda

- Oman Super Cup (1): 2009
