= Baýramdurdy Meredow =

Turkmenistan footballer

Personal information
- Date of birth: 27 March 1979 (age 47)
- Height: 1.83 m (6 ft 0 in)
- Position: Defender

Senior career*
Years	Team	Apps	(Gls)
2000	Nisa Aşgabat		
2001	Jeýhun Türkmenabat		
2002	Garagum Türkmenabat		
2003–2004	Nebitçi Balkanabat		
2005	FC Vostok	14	(0)
2006	Merw		
2007–2010	HTTU Aşgabat		

International career
2003–2010	Turkmenistan	10	(0)
- * Club domestic league appearances and goals

Baýramdurdi Meredow (27 March 1979) is a Turkmen former footballer who played as a defender. He was part of the Turkmenistan squad for the 2004 AFC Asian Cup.
