= Tawfeeq Abdul Razzaq =

Emirati footballer (born 1982)

Personal information
- Full name: Tawfeeq Abdul Razzaq Al Hosani
- Date of birth: 1 July 1982 (age 44)
- Place of birth: United Arab Emirates
- Position: Midfielder

Senior career*
Years	Team	Apps	(Gls)
2003–2009	Al-Wahda		
2009–2012	Al Dhafra SCC		
2012–2016	Al-Wahda		

International career
2004	United Arab Emirates	0	(0)
- * Club domestic league appearances and goals

Tawfeeq Abdul Razzaq Al Hosani (born 1 July 1982) is a UAE football midfielder. He played for Al-Wahda and counts 6 apps in the AFC Champions League

He was chosen for United Arab Emirates squad at the 2004 Asian Cup but did not play.
