= Hamdi Hobais =

Omani footballer and manager (born 1984)

Personal information
- Full name: Hamdi Hobais Sher Jandal Al-Sharjandal
- Date of birth: 27 January 1984 (age 42)
- Place of birth: Salalah, Oman
- Height: 1.79 m (5 ft 10 in)
- Position: Centre-back

Youth career
- 1996–1999: Al-Nasr

Senior career*
Years	Team	Apps	(Gls)
1999–2004	Al-Nasr	?	(?)
2004–2005	Al-Nasr	?	(0)
2005–2012	Al-Nasr	?	(2)
2012–2013	Salalah	?	(3)
Total		?	(5)

International career
2003–2005	Oman	28	(0)

Managerial career
- 2013–: Al-Nasr U-19
- * Club domestic league appearances and goals

Hamdi Hobais Sher Jandal Al-Sharjandal (Arabic: حمدي هوبيس شير الشير جندل; born 27 January 1984), commonly known as Hamdi Hobais, is an Omani football manager and a former footballer who is the current manager of Al-Nasr S.C.S.C. U-19.

== Club career statistics ==
Club	Season	Division	League		Cup		Continental (Note: Includes goal in the AFC Cup)		Other		Total	
Club	Season	Division	Apps	Goals	Apps	Goals	Apps	Goals	Apps	Goals	Apps	Goals
Al-Nasr	2005–06	Omani League	-	0	-	0	-	1	-	0	-	1
Al-Nasr	2006–07	Omani League	-	1	-	0	-	0	-	0	-	1
Al-Nasr	2009–10	Omani League	-	1	-	0	-	0	-	0	-	1
Al-Nasr	Total		-	2	-	0	0	1	-	0	-	3
Salalah	2012–13	Oman Elite League	-	3	-	0	0	0	-	0	-	3
Salalah	Total		-	3	-	0	0	0	-	0	-	3
Career total			-	5	-	0	0	1	-	0	-	6

== International career ==
Hamdi was selected for the national team for the first time in 2003. He has made appearances in the qualification for the 2006 FIFA World Cup qualification and the 2004 Asian Cup and has represented the national team in the 2010 FIFA World Cup qualification and the 2014 FIFA World Cup qualification.

== Managerial career ==
Hamdi holds the AFC C License, the fourth highest football coaching qualification in Asian Football Confederation. He began his managerial career just a few months after retiring from club football in 2013. He first began managing the club with whom he began both his youth and professional career, Fanja U-19.
