= Sorouri =

Sorouri (also spelled Soruri; Persian: سُروری) is an Iranian surname. Notable people with the surname include:

- Soruri Kashani (died after 1626/27), poet and lexicographer in Safavid Iran
- Jamileh Sorouri (born 1950), Iranian gymnast
- Nabi Sorouri (1933–2002), Iranian wrestler
- Paradise Sorouri, Afghan rapper
- Parviz Sorouri (born 1960), Iranian politician
