= Omar Berdiýew =

Turkmenistan footballer (1979–2023)

Personal information
- Date of birth: 25 June 1979
- Place of birth: Turkmen SSR, USSR
- Date of death: 6 January 2023 (aged 43)
- Height: 1.83 m (6 ft 0 in)
- Position: Defender

Senior career*
Years	Team	Apps	(Gls)
2000–2001	Köpetdag Aşgabat		
2002	Nisa Aşgabat		
2002	Shakhter Karagandy	5	(0)
2003	Nisa Aşgabat		
2003	Metalist Kharkiv	2	(0)
2004	Atyrau	24	(2)
2005–2006	Esil Bogatyr	52	(6)
2007	Atyrau	13	(0)
2007–2008	Dinamo Samarqand	39	(4)
2009	Olmaliq	11	(1)
2009–2010	Karvan	4	(0)

International career
2000–2010	Turkmenistan	37	(1)
- * Club domestic league appearances and goals

Omar Berdiýew (25 June 1979 – 6 January 2023) was a Turkmenistan footballer who played as a defender. Berdiýew was a member of the Turkmenistan national team. He died on 6 January 2023, at the age of 43.

== Career statistics ==
Score and result list Turkmenistan's goal tally first, score column indicates score after Berdiýew goal.

International goal scored by Omar Berdiýew
No.	Date	Venue	Opponent	Score	Result	Competition
1	19 November 2003	Ashgabat, Turkmenistan	Afghanistan		11–0	2006 FIFA World Cup qualification
