= Adel Abbas =

Bahraini footballer

Personal information
- Date of birth: 24 October 1982 (age 44)
- Height: 1.65 m (5 ft 5 in)
- Position: Defender

Senior career*
Years	Team	Apps	(Gls)
- Riffa SC
- Manama Club

International career
- Bahrain
- * Club domestic league appearances and goals

Adel Abbas Abdullah (born 24 October 1982) is a Bahraini former footballer who played as a defender for Bahrain in the 2004 AFC Asian Cup. He played club football for Riffa SC and Manama Club.
