= Jamal Jouhar =

Qatari footballer (born 1987)

Personal information
- Date of birth: 26 July 1987 (age 39)
- Place of birth: Qatar
- Position: Forward

Senior career*
Years	Team	Apps	(Gls)
2003–2008	Al Ahli	-	(-)
2008–2009	Qatar	-	(-)

International career
2004	Qatar	3	(0)
- * Club domestic league appearances and goals

Jamal Jouhar (born 26 July 1987) is a Qatari football forward who played for Qatar in the 2004 Asian Cup. He also played for Al Ahli.
