= Khalil Sharif =

Qatari footballer (born 1984)

Personal information
- Full name: Khalil Sharif Makanshahi
- Date of birth: 5 November 1984 (age 42)
- Place of birth: Qatar
- Height: 1.75 m (5 ft 9 in)
- Position: Left-back

Team information
- Current team: Al Bidda
- Number: 66

Senior career*
Years	Team	Apps	(Gls)
2005–2010	Mesaimeer	-	(-)
2010–2014	Al-Wakrah	55	(2)
2014–2015	Umm Salal	0	(0)
2015–2019	Al Ahli	44	(0)
2019–2020	Mesaimeer	-	(-)
2020–2022	Al Bidda	-	(-)
- * Club domestic league appearances and goals

Khalil Sharif (Arabic: خليل شريف) (born 5 November 1984) is a Qatari footballer. He currently plays as a left back.
