= Sarur, Iran =

Sarur سرور
- Village
- Country: Iran
- Province: Lorestan
- County: Khorramabad
- Bakhsh: Papi
- Rural District: Tang-e Haft

Population (2006)
  - Total: 44
- Time zone: UTC+3:30 (IRST)
  - Summer (DST): UTC+4:30 (IRDT)

Sarur (Persian: سرور, also Romanized as Sarūr) is a village in Tang-e Haft Rural District, Papi District, Khorramabad County, Lorestan Province, Iran. At the 2006 census, its population was 44, in 12 families.
