= Mohammad Khouja =

Saudi Arabian footballer

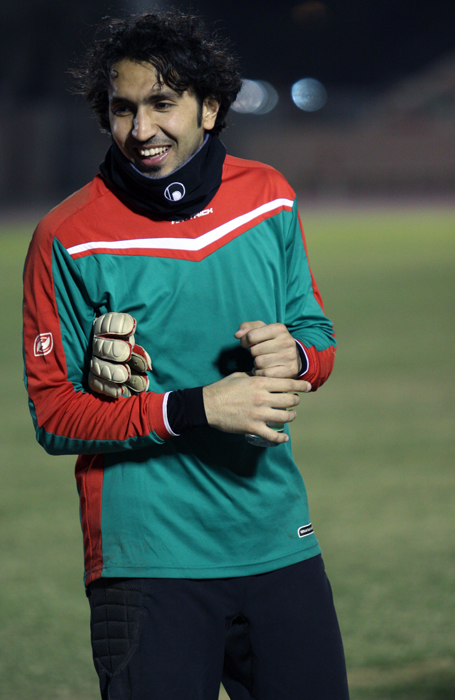

Personal information
- Full name: Mohammad Khouja
- Date of birth: March 15, 1982 (age 44)
- Place of birth: Medina, Saudi Arabia
- Height: 1.89 m (6 ft 2 1/2 in)
- Position: Goalkeeper

Senior career*
Years	Team	Apps	(Gls)
2004–2005	Ohud Medina		
2006–2009	Al-Shabab		
2009–2013	Ettifaq FC		

International career^{‡}
2004–2007	Saudi Arabia	8	(0)
- * Club domestic league appearances and goals as of 14 June 2012 ‡ National team caps and goals as of 23 March 2007

Mohammad Khouja (Arabic: محمد خوجة; born March 15, 1982) is a Saudi Arabian retired footballer who played as a goalkeeper.

== Career ==
At club level, Khouja played for the Al-Shabab football club based in Riyadh. He also has 8 international caps with the Saudi Arabia national team, participating in the 2006 FIFA World Cup.
