= Shabab Al-Hussein SC =

Shabab Al-Hussein
- Full name: Shabab Al-Hussein Sports Club
- Founded: 1954; 72 years ago
- Ground: King Abdullah II Stadium
- Capacity: 20,000
- League: Jordanian Second Division League
- 2026: Jordanian Second Division League – Group 2, semi-finalist
- Website: Official page
Home colours	Away colours

The previous logo of Shabab Al-Hussein SC

Shabab Al-Hussein Sports Club (Arabic: نادي شباب الحسين الرياضي) is a Jordanian football club based in Amman, Jordan. It currently competes in the Jordanian Second Division League, the third tier of Jordanian football.

== History ==
Founded in 1954, Shabab Al-Hussein Sports Club was established in the Jabal Al-Hussein Palestinian refugee camp in Amman, one of the camps established in Jordan to accommodate refugees from the 1948 Palestinian expulsion and flight. The club is located in the middle of the camp and owns a sports hall established in 1983, which is considered to be among the first gyms in Jordan.

Considered to historically be among the most prestigious sports clubs in Jordan, Shabab Al-Hussein is best known for their football and volleyball programs.

The club is also characterized by its ability to discover talent, which such players proceeding to have successful careers. These include players like Hassouneh Al-Sheikh, Hatem Aqel, Amjad Al-Shuaibi, and Alaa' Matalqa, who have all graduated from Shabab Al-Hussein's academy.

=== Financial struggles and regression ===
Despite financial difficulties in the 2000s, Shabab Al-Hussein were able to reach the Jordan FA Cup final in 2005, finishing as runners-up of the competition, as well as fininshing as runners-up of the Jordan FA Shield in 2000 and 2003.

Despite these successes, Shabab Al-Hussein were last seen at the Jordanian Pro League in the 2012–13 season and have not returned to the top flight of Jordanian football since. They were also last seen in the Jordanian First Division League back in the 2019 season.

=== Recent history ===
Shabab Al-Hussein took part in the 2024 Jordanian Third Division League, where it managed to reach the quarter-final that season. On 7 November 2024, the Jordan Football Association announced that it would restructure the Jordanian Second Division League for the upcoming season, which included the promotion of all quarter-finalists, including Shabab Al-Hussein.

== Honours ==
- Jordan FA Cup
  - Finalist: 2005
- Jordan FA Shield
  - Finalist: 2000, 2003

== Notable players ==
The following players have either played at the professional or international level, either before, during or after playing for Shabab Al-Hussein SC:

- (Jordan) Ayman Abu Fares
- (Jordan) Abdullah Abu Zaitoun
- (Jordan) Hassouneh Al-Sheikh
- (Jordan) Hatem Aqel
- (Jordan) Amjad Al-Shuaibi
- (Jordan) Ghanem Hamarsheh
- (Jordan) Mohammad Khair
- (Jordan) Alaa' Matalqa
- (Jordan) Yazan Thalji
- (Syria) Omar Abdulrazaq

== Managerial history ==
- (Iraq) Nazar Ashraf
- (Jordan) Ra'ed Asfour
- (Jordan) Mohammad Al-Abourah
- (Syria) Abdel-Rahman Idrees
- (Jordan) Ra'ed Assaf

== Kit providers ==
- Adidas
