= Saleh Mahdi =

Kuwaiti footballer

Personal information
- Full name: Saleh Mahdi
- Date of birth: July 9, 1981 (age 45)
- Place of birth: Kuwait City, Kuwait
- Height: 1.80 m (5 ft 11 in)
- Position: Goalkeeper

Youth career
- 1992–1998: Al-Salmiya SC

Senior career*
| Years | Team | Apps | (Gls) |
| 1997–2010 | Al-Salmiya SC | 105 | (0) |
| 2010–2010 | Honvéd | 0 | (0) |
| 2010–2011 | Al-Qadsia (loan) | 10 | (0) |
| 2011–2012 | Al Shabab | 15 | (0) |
| 2012–2013 | Al-Fahaheel FC | 21 | (0) |
| 2013–2014 | Al Sahel | 3 | (0) |
| 2014–2014 | Al-Yarmouk | 2 | (0) |
| 2014–2015 | Al Naser | 3 | (0) |
| 2015–2016 | Al-Yarmouk | 8 | (0) |
| 2016–2017 | Al Tadamon | 6 | (0) |
| 2017–2019 | Al-Yarmouk | 13 | (0) |
| Total | | 192 | (0) |

International career
| 2000–2006 | Kuwait | 2 | (0) |
- * Club domestic league appearances and goals

Saleh Mehdi is a Kuwaiti football goalkeeper who played for Kuwait in the 2004 AFC Asian Cup.
