= Rustam Saparov =

Turkmenistan footballer

Personal information
- Date of birth: 10 April 1978 (age 48)
- Place of birth: Turkmen SSR, Soviet Union
- Height: 1.83 m (6 ft 0 in)
- Position: Midfielder

Senior career*
Years	Team	Apps	(Gls)
2002	Garagum Turkmenabat		
2003–2007	Nebitçi Balkanabat		
2007	Nasaf	14	(0)
2008–2009	Aşgabat		
2010	Lebap		

International career
2003–2008	Turkmenistan	17	(1)
- * Club domestic league appearances and goals

Rustam Saparov (Turkmen: Rüstem Saparow;born 10 April 1978) is a retired Turkmenistani footballer.

== Career ==
During 2007, Saparov played 14 times for Uzbek League club FC Nasaf.

== Career statistics ==
=== International ===
As of match played 3 March 2008

Appearances and goals by national team and year
National team	Year	Apps	Goals
Turkmenistan	2003	7	0
Turkmenistan	2004	6	0
Turkmenistan	2005	0	0
Turkmenistan	2006	0	0
Turkmenistan	2007	0	0
Turkmenistan	2008	4	1
Total		17	1

As of goal scored on 13 October 2001
Scores and results list Uzbekistan's goal tally first, score column indicates score after each Saparow goal.

List of international goals scored by Rustam Saparow
No.	Date	Venue	Opponent	Score	Result	Competition	Ref.
1	18 May 2008	Nizwa Sports Complex, Nizwa, Oman	Oman	1–1	1–2	Friendly	
