= Ali Mejbel Fartoos =

Qatari footballer (born 1982)

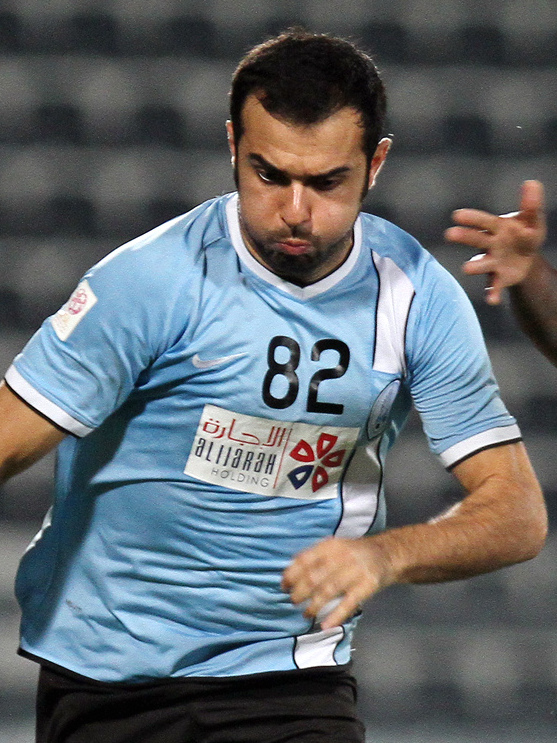
- Ali Mejbel in 2012

Personal information
- Full name: Ali Mejbel Fartoos Deyab
- Date of birth: 17 June 1982 (age 44)
- Place of birth: Iraq
- Height: 1.82 m (6 ft 0 in)
- Position: Striker

Senior career*
Years	Team	Apps	(Gls)
2000–2007	Al Wakrah	97	(23)
2007–2008	Al Rayyan	14	(3)
2008–2009	Al Wakrah	19	(1)
2009–2010	Al Arabi	19	(3)
2010–2011	Al-Sailiya SC	21	(4)
2011–2012	Al Arabi	11	(1)
2012–2017	Al Wakrah	1	(0)
2014–2015	→ Al Shamal (loan)		
2015–2016	→ Al-Sailiya SC (loan)		
2017–2018	Al-Markhiya		
2018	Al Shamal		
2018–2019	Al Bidda		

International career^{‡}
2004–2006	Qatar	4	(0)
- * Club domestic league appearances and goals as of 22 September 2012 ‡ National team caps and goals as of 28 June 2007

Ali Mejbel Fartoos (born 17 June 1982) is a former footballer who played as a striker for different Qatari clubs. He was born in Iraq, he represented the Qatar national team.

Mejbel is originally Iraqi, his father being Mejbel Fartous, a defender with the Iraq national football team during the 1980s before becoming a senior Ba'ath party official.
