= Ahmed Matar =

Iraqi poet

- أحمد مطر
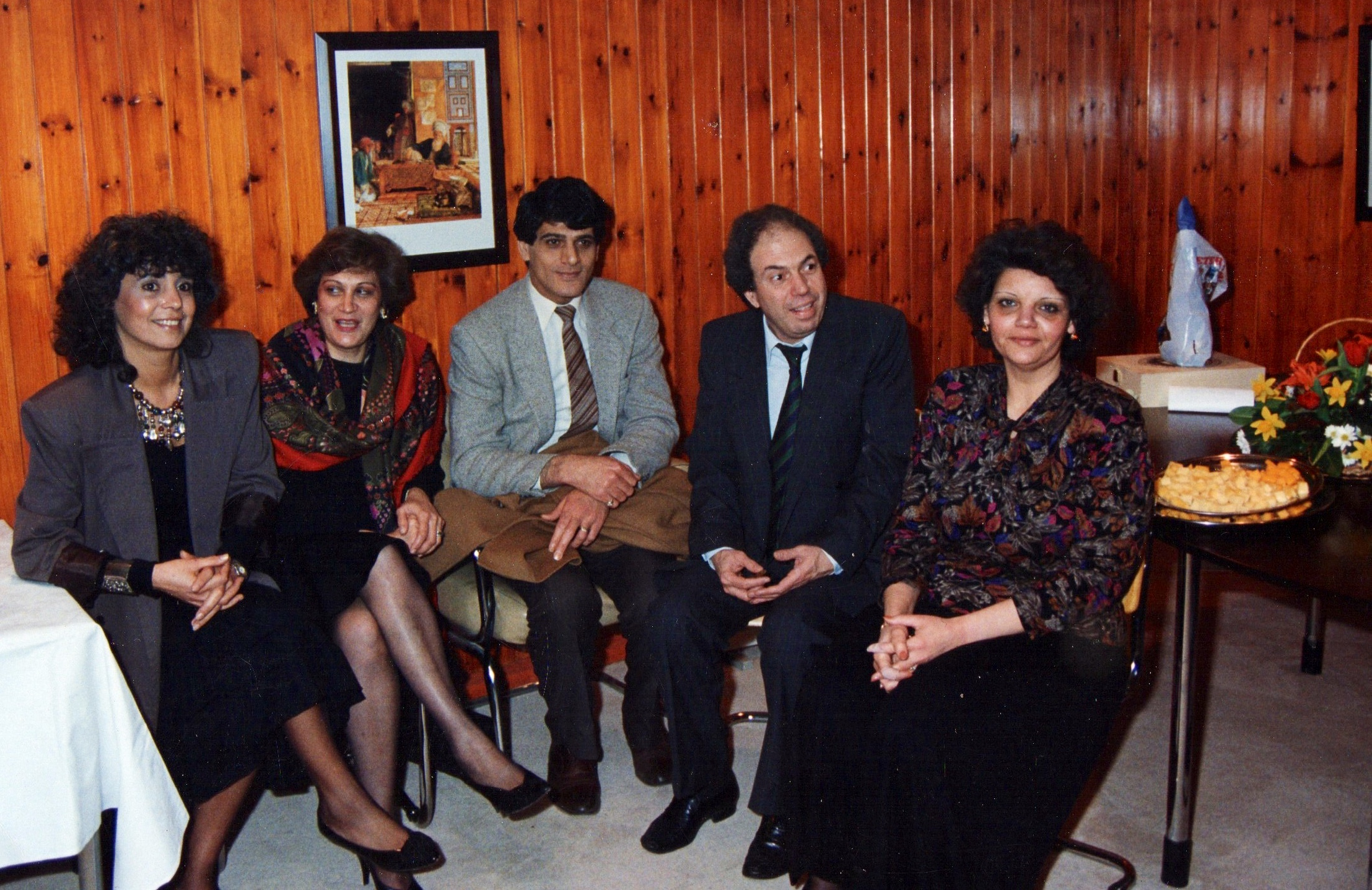
- Born: 1954 (age 71–72); Tanoma, Basra, Kingdom of Iraq
- Other name: Poet of The Two Rivers ("شاعر النهرين")
- Occupation: Poet

Ahmed Matar (Arabic: أحمد مطر, born 1954) is a revolutionary Iraqi poet who has been living in exile for decades, most recently in London.

His poetry is critical of dictatorial Arab rulers, especially the Iraqi rulers, the lack of freedoms, the use of torture and extrajudicial punishments, clinging to power at all costs, and the conditions of Arab societies.

== Early life ==
Matar was born in Tanoma, a small city in southern Iraq's Basra Governorate. He is the fourth of ten children. He is married and has three sons and a daughter.

== Poetry ==
Matar started composing poetry when he was fourteen. His first poems were mostly romantic before he turned to politics as his main subject. He recited long poems on stage where he actually openly criticized the status quo. This, however, forced him to flee early in his life to Kuwait.

== Career ==
He moved to Kuwait in his mid-twenties where he worked as a cultural editor for the newspaper Al-Qabas. He continued composing poems in his own journal before they were finally published in Al-Qabas. He then befriended the caricaturist Naji al-Ali, with whom he shared an ideological and artistic vision.

== Exile ==
Due to his harsh criticism of the Arab status quo and its ideology, Matar has again had to flee Kuwait, as has his close friend Naji Al Ali, who had to leave the country because of his caricatures. In 1986, Matar finally settled in London.

On his poetry, Matar said I didn't intend to make myself a school when I first started writing poetry; I just wanted to say the truth... and I did. I now can assure you that readers can tell my poetry without my name been attached [sic] to it.

== Poetry in the time of action ==
In a commentary he made after the Arab Uprisings in 2011, Ahmed Matar speaks eloquently about poetry in the context of action:

"Poetry is not an Arab regime that falls with the death of the ruler. And it's also not an alternative to action. It's an art form whose job is agitating, exposing, and witnessing reality, and aspiring beyond the present. Poetry comes before action. Then poetry catches up. Poetry lights the road, and guides our deeds. Back in the day, Nassr Bin Seyar said, “Indeed, war begins with speech.” In reality, speech surrounds war from its beginning to its end through awareness, instigation, and glorification. Indeed, action needs the influence of sincere speech. Because its absence means filling the space with contradictory speech. And we know that this contradictory speech is always present and active, even while truth exists. So, imagine that the space was entirely void of truth. There is no resistance on the face of earth that would dispense the poet for the fighter. Every living resistance realizes that there is no use for bloodshed without a moral conscience. The history of our people is the greatest witness to the importance of the poet's role in war. The fighter has always sharpened both his sword and tongue."

== Legacy ==
Matar remains a prominent poet in the Arab world, and his poetry is often cited when criticizing authorities. On 3 October 2021, Amer Ayad, a Zitouna TV talk-show host, read one of Ahmed Matar's poems on air. The reading was seen by the authorities of the ruling government as an indictment of President Kais Saied, whose then-recent self-coup proved controversial. This led to the arrest of Ayad from his home, as well as the member of parliament who was the guest of the episode.

Below are some of his poems, translated to English:

- The Hope الأمل
- People of exile منفيون
- The defector المنشق
- My friend Hassan صاحبي حسن
- A tear over the dead body of freedom دمعة على جثمان الحرية
- Takfir and the revolution التكفير و الثورة
- Even more brutal than execution أقسى من الإعدام
- Yes, I am a Terrorist نعم، أنا إرهابي

== See also ==
- Iraqi art
- List of Iraqi artists
