= Abdul Ghafoor Murad =

Qatari footballer (born 1989)

Personal information
- Full name: Abdul Ghafoor Murad Abdullah
- Date of birth: 12 March 1989 (age 37)
- Place of birth: Qatar
- Height: 1.79 m (5 ft 10 in)
- Position: Defender

Youth career
- Al Rayyan

Senior career*
Years	Team	Apps	(Gls)
2006–2015	Al Rayyan	18	(1)
2013	→ Al-Sailiya SC (loan)		
2013–2014	→ Qatar SC (loan)		
2014–2015	→ Mesaimeer (loan)		
2015–2017	Al Ahli		
2017–2020	Muaither		

International career
2010–2012	Qatar U-23		
- * Club domestic league appearances and goals

Abdul Ghafoor Murad (born 12 March 1989) is a Qatari footballer. He currently plays as a defender.

== Career ==
Apart from three loan spells, he played most of his career at Al Rayyan. He transferred to Al Ahli in July 2015.
