= Yousef Zayed =

Kuwaiti footballer

Personal information
- Full name: Yoused Zayed Al-Youha
- Date of birth: 2 September 1979 (age 47)
- Height: 1.82 m (5 ft 11 1/2 in)
- Position: Defender

Senior career*
Years	Team	Apps	(Gls)
1999–2003	Al-Fahaheel		
2003–2009	Kuwait SC		
2009–2011	Al-Salmiya		
2011–2012	Kuwait SC		

International career
1999–2002	Kuwait U23		
2002–2008	Kuwait	23	(0)
- * Club domestic league appearances and goals

Yousef Zayed (born 2 September 1979) is a Kuwaiti footballer. He competed in the men's tournament at the 2000 Summer Olympics.
