= Abdulrahman Abdulkarim =

Bahraini footballer

Personal information
- Date of birth: 13 May 1980 (age 46)
- Place of birth: Bahrain
- Height: 1.86 m (6 ft 1 in)
- Position: Goalkeeper

Senior career*
Years	Team	Apps	(Gls)
1998-2004	Al Hala SC	-	(-)
2004-2018	Al-Najma		

International career
2000–2007	Bahrain	7	(0)
- * Club domestic league appearances and goals

Abdulrahman Abdulkarim (born 13 May 1980) is a Bahrain football goalkeeper who played for Bahrain in the 2004 Asian Cup. He also played for Al-Najma.
