= Ýewgeniý Zemskow =

Turkmenistani footballer

Yewgeniy Zemskov
Personal information
- Date of birth: 17 March 1982 (age 44)
- Place of birth: Turkmenistan
- Position: Forward

Senior career*
Years	Team	Apps	(Gls)
2003–2007	Nisa Asgabat	-	( –)
2006–2012	Lokomotiv Tashkent	-	( –)

International career
2004–2008	Turkmenistan	9	(0)
- * Club domestic league appearances and goals

Ýewgeniý Zemskow (Russian: Евгений Земсков; born 17 March 1982) is a Turkmenistani football striker who played for Turkmenistan in the 2004 AFC Asian Cup.

Zemskow played for Uzbek League side Lokomotiv Tashkent during the 2007 and 2008 seasons. He has also played for Nisa Asgabat.
