= Abdulrahman Mesbeh =

Qatari footballer (born 1984)

Personal information
- Full name: Abdulrahman Mesbeh Al Meamari
- Date of birth: January 7, 1984 (age 42)
- Place of birth: Qatar
- Height: 1.77 m (5 ft 10 in)
- Position: Full back

Senior career*
Years	Team	Apps	(Gls)
1999–2013	Al Rayyan	204	(0)
2013–2015	Qatar SC	31	(0)
2015–2016	Al Ahli	41	(0)
2016–2019	Al-Kharaitiyat		
2018–2019	→ Mesaimeer (loan)		
2019–2021	Al-Waab		

International career^{‡}
2003–2007	Qatar	8	(0)
- * Club domestic league appearances and goals as of March 22, 2012 ‡ National team caps and goals as of March 22, 2012

Abdulrahman Mesbeh (Arabic:عبد الرحمن مصباح; born January 7, 1984) is a Qatari footballer. He currently plays as a full back.

Mesbeh was a member of the Qatar national football team from 2003 till 2007.
