= Ayiman Suroor =

Omani footballer (born 1980)

Personal information
- Full name: Ayiman Suroor Marhoon Al-Maawali
- Date of birth: 25 April 1980 (age 46)
- Place of birth: Oman
- Position: Midfielder

Senior career*
Years	Team	Apps	(Gls)
2003–2004	Al-Seeb	?	(?)

International career
2004	Oman	4	(0)
- * Club domestic league appearances and goals

Ayiman Suroor Marhoon Al-Maawali (Arabic: أيمن سرور مرهون الموالي; born 25 April 1980), commonly known as Ayiman Suroor, is an Omani footballer who played for Al-Seeb Club from 2003 to 2004 in the Omani League.

== International career ==
Ayiman was selected for the national team for the first time in 2004. He has made appearances in the 2004 Asian Cup and the 2006 FIFA World Cup qualification.
