= Ali Al Namash =

Kuwaiti footballer

Personal information
- Full name: Ali Al Namash
- Date of birth: October 31, 1982 (age 43)
- Place of birth: Kuwait City, Kuwait
- Height: 1.65 m (5 ft 5 in)
- Position: Defender

Youth career
- 1994–2003: Al Qadsia

Senior career*
Years	Team	Apps	(Gls)
2003–2011	Al Qadsia		
2011–2012	Al Salmiya	3	(0)

International career^{‡}
2003–2007	Kuwait	10	(0)
- * Club domestic league appearances and goals as of January 19, 2011 ‡ National team caps and goals as of January 19, 2011

Ali Al Namash (Arabic: علي النمش; born 31 October 1982) is a Kuwaiti former footballer who played as a defender for the Kuwaiti Premier League side Al Salmiya on loan from Al Qadsia. He played for the Kuwait national team.
