= Ali Saeed Abdulla =

Bahraini footballer

Personal information
- Full name: Ali Saeed Karim Ali Abdulla
- Date of birth: 24 September 1979 (age 47)
- Height: 1.85 m (6 ft 1 in)
- Position: Goalkeeper

Senior career*
Years	Team	Apps	(Gls)
2000–2009	Al-Ahli		
2009–2011	Riffa SC		
2011–2012	Muscat Club		
2012–2014	Al-Seeb Club		

International career
2003–2012	Bahrain	22	(0)
- * Club domestic league appearances and goals

Ali Saeed Karim Ali Abdulla (born 24 September 1979) is a Bahraini former footballer who played as a goalkeeper for Bahrain in the 2004 AFC Asian Cup.
