= Waleed Mohyaden =

Qatari football midfielder (born 1982)

Personal information
- Full name: Waleed Mohyaden
- Date of birth: 22 May 1982 (age 44)
- Place of birth: Qatar
- Positions: Left-back; winger

Senior career*
Years	Team	Apps	(Gls)
2002–2003	Al-Markhiya		
2003–2008	Al-Khor		
2008–2011	Al-Sailiya		
2011–2012	Al-Arabi		
2012–2015	Umm Salal		
2015–2016	Al-Khor		
2016–2017	Umm Salal		
2017–2019	Al-Shamal		
2018–2019	→ Mesaimeer (loan)		

International career
2003–2005	Qatar		
- * Club domestic league appearances and goals

Waleed Mohyaden Ahmed (born 22 May 1982) is a Qatari football midfielder who played former Qatar in the 2004 AFC Asian Cup.

Mohyaden signed for Qatar Stars League side Umm Salal from Al Arabi in June 2012.
