= 2011–12 Al Sadd SC season =

Al Sadd SC
2011–12 season
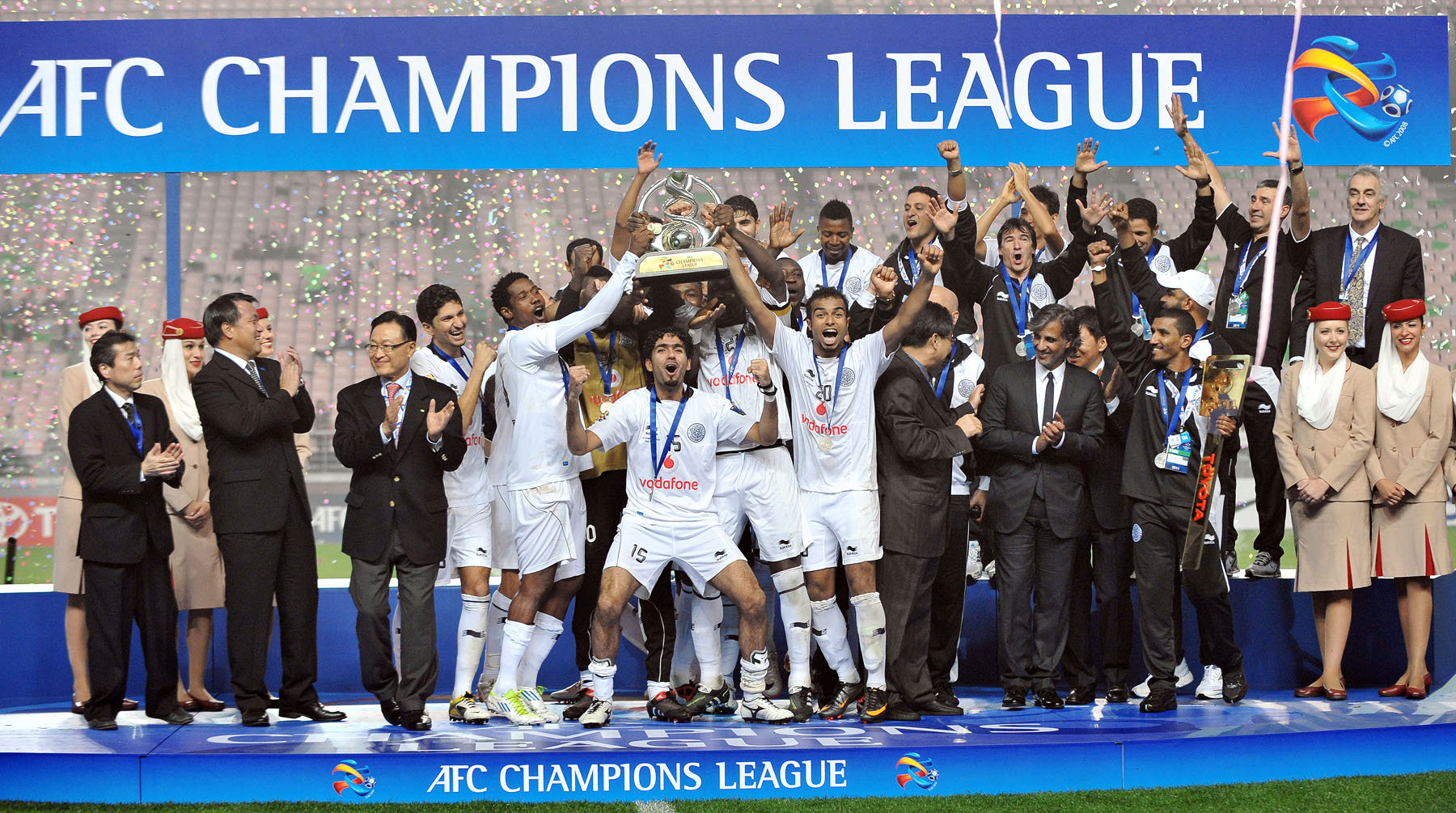
- Al Sadd celebrate after winning 2011 AFC Champions League.
- Chairman: Muhammed bin Khalifa Al Thani
- Head coach: Jorge Fossati
- Stadium: Jassim bin Hamad Stadium, Doha
- Qatar Stars League: 4th
- Emir of Qatar Cup: Runners–up
- Qatar Crown Prince Cup: Runners–up
- Champions League: Winners
- FIFA Club World Cup: Third place
- Top goalscorer: League: Khalfan Ibrahim (8); All: Khalfan Ibrahim (12)

In the 2011–12 season, Al Sadd SC competed in the Qatar Stars League for the 39th season, as well as the Emir of Qatar Cup the Crown Prince Cup and the Champions League.

They won the 2011 AFC Champions League Final against Jeonbuk, 4–2 on penalties. This earned them a spot in the 2011 FIFA Club World Cup.

To date, this is the best result achieved by a Qatari team in the AFC Champions League under its new format. Al Sadd also became the first team to reach the AFC Champions League knockout stage after starting their campaign in the play-offs in February. Furthermore, Al Sadd was crowned "AFC Club of the Year" in 2011 by AFC after their Champions League conquest. Championship 2011 in honor of the club's owner changed the team logo and stars to commemorate the AFC Champions League 1988. 2011 was etched on the shirt Wolves.

During the 2011 FIFA Club World Cup, Al Sadd were eliminated in the semifinal by Barcelona, which set up a third-place meeting between them and Kashiwa Reysol. This was the first time two clubs from the same confederation faced off each other in a third-place match. Al Sadd won the encounter on penalties in order to be the first West Asian club to claim the bronze medal in the FIFA Club World Cup.

== Competitions ==
=== Overview ===
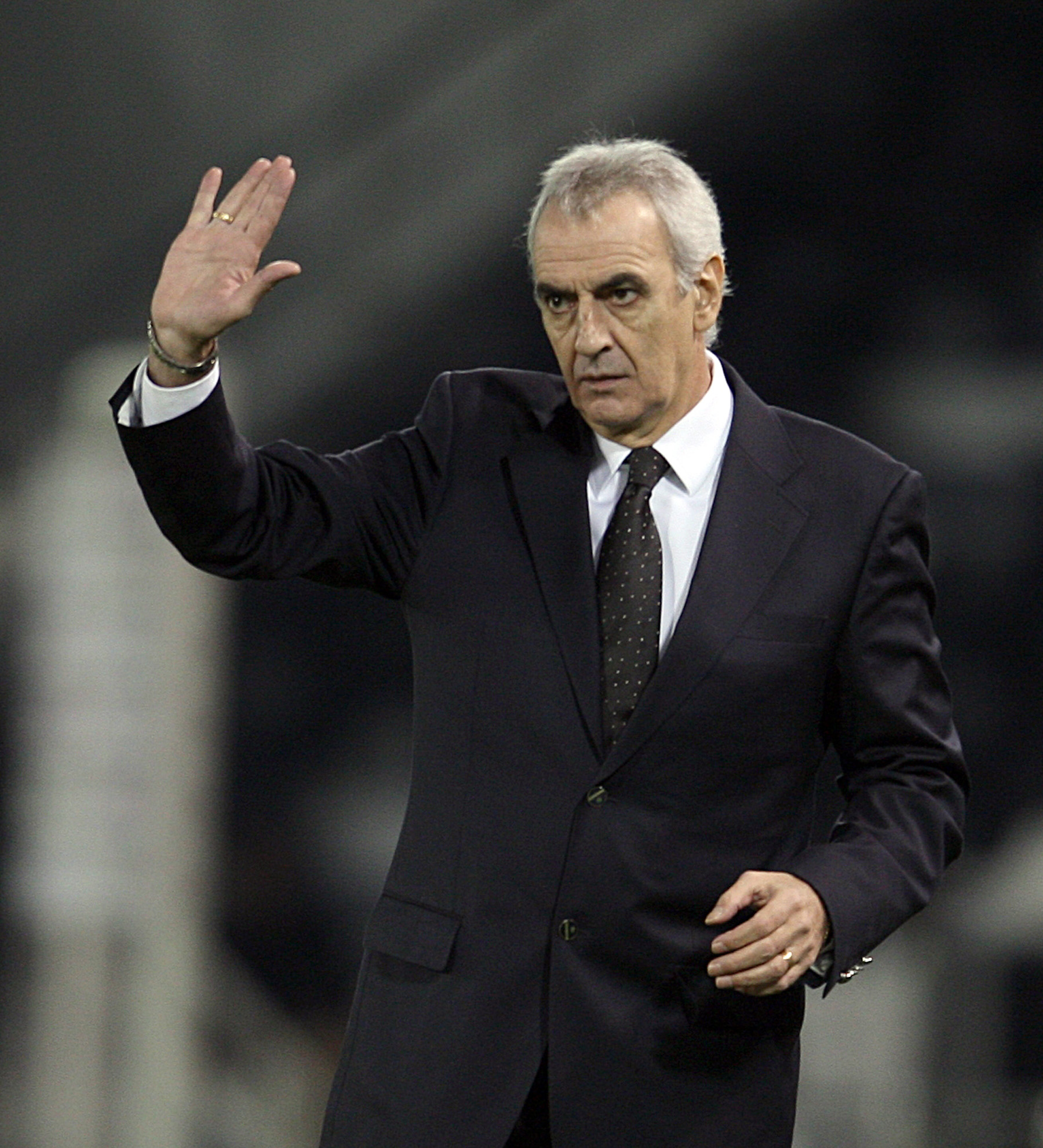
Fossati helped the club achieve a 2011 AFC Champions League Final.

Competition	Record								Started round	Final position / round	First match	Last match
Competition	G	W	D	L	GF	GA	GD	Win %	Started round	Final position / round	First match	Last match
Qatar Stars League	22	10	6	6	35	24	+11	45.45	Matchday 1	4th	18 September 2011	13 April 2012
Emir of Qatar Cup	3	2	1	0	5	0	+5	66.67	Quarter-final	Runners–up	5 May 2012	12 May 2012
Qatar Crown Prince Cup	2	1	1	0	5	3	+2	50.00	Semi-finals	Runners–up	21 April 2012	26 April 2012
Champions League	5	2	1	2	8	5	+3	40.00	Quarterfinal	Winners	14 September 2011	5 November 2011
FIFA Club World Cup	3	1	1	1	2	5	−3	33.33	Quarterfinal	Third place	11 December 2011	18 December 2011
Total	35	16	10	9	55	37	+18	45.71				

Updated to match played 9 May 2017
Source: Competitions

=== Qatar Stars League ===
==== League table ====
Pos	Team	Pld	W	D	L	GF	GA	GD	Pts	Qualification or relegation
2	El Jaish	22	12	5	5	48	24	+24	41	2013 AFC Champions League Group stage
3	Al-Rayyan	22	10	9	3	49	26	+23	39	2013 AFC Champions League Group stage
4	Al Sadd	22	10	6	6	35	24	+11	36	
5	Al-Khor	22	9	5	8	30	29	+1	32	
6	Al-Gharafa	22	8	7	7	26	27	−1	31	2013 AFC Champions League Group stage (Note: Al-Gharafa secured qualification for the 2013 AFC Champions League through winning the 2012 Emir of Qatar Cup)

Updated to match(es) played on 13 April 2012. Source: RSSSF
Rules for classification: 1) points; 2) goal difference; 3) number of goals scored.

==== Results summary ====
Overall								Home						Away					
Pld	W	D	L	GF	GA	GD	Pts	W	D	L	GF	GA	GD	W	D	L	GF	GA	GD
22	10	6	6	35	24	+11	36	5	5	1	21	11	+10	5	1	5	14	13	+1

Last updated: 29 December 2014.
Source: Competitive matches

==== Results by round ====
Round	1	2	3	4	5	6	7	8	9	10	11	12	13	14	15	16	17	18	19	20	21	22
Ground	H	A	H	H	H	A	A	A	A	A	H	A	H	A	A	A	H	H	H	H	H	A
Result	D	W	W	W	W	L	W	L	L	W	D	W	W	W	D	L	D	L	D	D	W	L
Position	4	3	2	1	1	2	1	1	3	2	2	1	1	1	2	2	2	3	4	4	4	4

Source: Competitive matches
A = Away; H = Home; W = Win; D = Draw; L = Loss

==== Matches ====
18 September 2011 Round 1	Al Sadd	1–1	Al Kharitiyath	Doha
19:30	Zakaria 90+5'	Report	43' Okwunwanne	Stadium: Jassim bin Hamad Stadium; Referee: Abdulrahman Abdou

24 September 2011 Round 2	Umm Salal	1–3	Al Sadd	Doha
17:30	Jamal 25'	Report	35' Rizik; 45+1', 82' Niang	Stadium: Thani bin Jassim Stadium

2 October 2011 Round 3	Al Sadd	1–0	Al Ahli	Doha
19:30	Afif 57'	Report		Stadium: Jassim bin Hamad Stadium

15 October 2011 Round 4	Al Sadd	3–1	Al Khor	Doha
19:00	Al-Haidos 20'; Kasola 65'; Mahmoud 76' (o.g.)	Report	22' Dagano	Stadium: Jassim bin Hamad Stadium

16 January 2012 Round 5	Al Sadd	4–1	Al Arabi	Doha
15:45	Ibrahim 14', 62'; Ahmed 17'; Belhadj 24'	Report	45+2' Siddiq	Stadium: Jassim bin Hamad Stadium

30 October 2011 Round 6	El Jaish SC	2–1	Al Sadd	Al Rayyan
18:00	Mahmoud 30'; Ribeiro 87'	Report	13' Afif	Stadium: Ahmed bin Ali Stadium

20 November 2011 Round 7	Lekhwiya	0–1	Al Sadd	Doha
17:30		Report	39' Al-Hamad	Stadium: Thani bin Jassim Stadium

25 November 2011 Round 8	Qatar SC	1–0	Al Sadd	Doha
17:30	Al Qahtani 86'	Report		Stadium: Suheim Bin Hamad Stadium

2 December 2011 Round 9	Al Rayyan	2–1	Al Sadd	Al Rayyan
15:30	Alves 18', 51'	Report	74' Mohamed	Stadium: Ahmed bin Ali Stadium; Referee: Abdulrahman Abdou

1 January 2011 Round 10	Al Wakrah	0–2	Al Sadd	Al Wakrah
15:30		Report	57' Al-Haidos; 58' Mohamed	Stadium: Saoud bin Abdulrahman Stadium

8 January 2012 Round 11	Al Sadd	0–0	Al Gharafa	Doha
16:15		Report		Stadium: Jassim bin Hamad Stadium

12 January 2012 Round 12	Al Kharitiyath	0–1	Al Sadd	Doha
14:15		Report	58' Ahmed	Stadium: Grand Hamad Stadium

21 January 2012 Round 13	Al Sadd	4–1	Umm Salal	Doha
16:15	Mohamed 36', 77'; Ibrahim 52'; Jung-Soo 90+1'	Report	56' Alves	Stadium: Jassim bin Hamad Stadium

27 January 2012 Round 14	Al Ahli	2–3	Al Sadd	Doha
16:30	Aboucherouane 65'; Kaluyituka 71'	Report	3' Ibrahim; 15' Mohamed; 47' Ahmed	Stadium: Grand Hamad Stadium

3 February 2012 Round 15	Al Khor	1–1	Al Sadd	Al Khor
14:30	Awal 7'	Report	23' Belhadj	Stadium: Al-Khawr Stadium

10 February 2012 Round 16	Al Arabi	1–0	Al Sadd	Doha
16:30	Hatem 86'	Report		Stadium: Grand Hamad Stadium; Referee: Wathik Al Baag

16 February 2012 Round 17	Al Sadd	1–1	El Jaish SC	Doha
14:30	Mohamed 53'	Report	49' Martins	Stadium: Jassim bin Hamad Stadium

11 March 2012 Round 18	Al Sadd	1–2	Lekhwiya	Doha
18:15	Ibrahim 78'	Report	56' Dagano; 82' Tae-hee	Stadium: Jassim bin Hamad Stadium

17 March 2012 Round 19	Al Sadd	3–3	Qatar SC	Doha
18:15	Niang 49' (pen.), 54'; Ibrahim 87'	Report	11', 41' Omar; 32' Soria	Stadium: Jassim bin Hamad Stadium

24 March 2012 Round 20	Al Sadd	0–0	Al Rayyan	Doha
16:30		Report		Stadium: Jassim bin Hamad Stadium; Referee: Wathik Al Baag

7 April 2012 Round 21	Al Sadd	3–1	Al Wakrah	Doha
17:30	Ahmed 25'; Ibrahim 56', 70'	Report	75' Akram	Stadium: Jassim bin Hamad Stadium; Referee: Mahmoud Ashour

13 April 2012 Round 22	Al Gharafa	3–1	Al Sadd	Doha
17:30	Tardelli 19'; Hassan 32', 45'	Report	48' Nabeel	Stadium: Thani bin Jassim Stadium

== Emir of Qatar Cup ==
5 May 2012 Quarter-finals	Al-Sadd	2–0	Al-Wakrah	Doha
17:30	Rizik 10'; Ahmed 90+2'			Stadium: Jassim bin Hamad Stadium

8 May 2012 Semi-finals	Al-Sadd	3–0	El Jaish	Doha
17:00	Niang 8'; Keïta 42'; Ibrahim Khalfan 59'			Stadium: Jassim bin Hamad Stadium

12 May 2012 Final	Al-Gharafa	0–0 (4 – 3 p)	Al-Sadd	Doha
16:00				Stadium: Khalifa International Stadium
	Penalties
	El Assas (penalty scored); Tardelli (penalty scored); Ze Roberto (penalty scored); Quaye (penalty missed); Al-shammeri (penalty scored)		(penalty scored) Niang; (penalty scored) Keïta; (penalty scored) Rizik; (penalty missed) Al-Haidos; (penalty missed) Belhadj

== Crown Prince Cup ==
21 April 2012 Semi-finals	Lekhwiya	2–4	Al-Sadd	Doha
18:45	Baba Malick (red card) 38'; Nam Tae-Hee 52' (pen.); Madjid Bougherra 84'	Report	Mamadou Niang 35' (pen.), 38', 94'; Khalfan Ibrahim 74'	Stadium: Suhaim bin Hamad Stadium; Referee: Fredy Fautrel (France)

26 April 2012 Final	Al-Sadd	1–1 (4 – 5 p)	Al Rayyan	Doha
18:45	Khalfan Ibrahim 61'	Report	Jaralla Al Marri 90+1'	Stadium: Suhaim bin Hamad Stadium; Attendance: 23,000; Referee: Banjar Al Dossari (Qatar)
	Penalties
	Khalfan (penalty scored); Yazeedi (penalty missed); Majid (penalty scored); Keïta (penalty scored); Belhadj (penalty scored)		(penalty scored) César; (penalty scored) Tabata; (penalty scored) Nathan; (penalty scored) Ismail; (penalty scored) Alves

== AFC Champions League ==
=== Knockout stage ===
==== Quarterfinals ====
14 September 2011	Sepahan (Iran)	0–3; Awarded	(Qatar) Al-Sadd	Isfahan
19:30 UTC+04:30	Ebrahimi 12'	Report		Stadium: Foolad Shahr Stadium; Attendance: 5,621; Referee: Ben Williams (Australia)

28 September 2011	Al-Sadd (Qatar)	1–2	(Iran) Sepahan	Doha
18:20 UTC+03:00	Niang 86'	Report	Emad 7'; Ashjari 27'	Stadium: Jassim bin Hamad Stadium; Attendance: 6,026; Referee: Yuichi Nishimura (Japan)

==== Semifinals ====
19 October 2011	Suwon Samsung Bluewings (South Korea)	0–2	(Qatar) Al-Sadd	Suwon
19:30 UTC+09:00		Report	Niang 70', 81'	Stadium: Suwon World Cup Stadium; Attendance: 9,864; Referee: Malik Abdul Bashir (Singapore)

26 October 2011	Al-Sadd (Qatar)	0–1	(South Korea) Suwon Samsung Bluewings	Doha
18:00 UTC+03:00		Report	Oh Jang-Eun 7'	Stadium: Jassim bin Hamad Stadium; Attendance: 10,800; Referee: Ali Al-Badwawi (UAE)

==== Final ====
5 November 2011	Jeonbuk Hyundai Motors (South Korea)	2–2 (a.e.t.) (2–4 p)	(Qatar) Al-Sadd	Jeonju
19:00 UTC+09:00	Eninho 17'; Lee Seung-Hyun 90+2'	Report	Sim Woo-Yeon 30' (o.g.); Keïta 61'	Stadium: Jeonju World Cup Stadium; Attendance: 41,805; Referee: Ravshan Irmatov (Uzbekistan)
	Penalties
	Eninho (penalty scored); Kim Dong-Chan (penalty missed); Park Won-Jae (penalty missed); Kim Sang-Sik (penalty scored)		(penalty scored) Niang; (penalty scored) Al Haidos; (penalty missed) Lee Jung-Soo; (penalty scored) Majid; (penalty scored) Belhadj

== FIFA Club World Cup ==
11 December 2011 Quarterfinal	Espérance (Tunisia)	1–2	(Qatar) Al Sadd	Toyota
16:00 (UTC+09:00)	Darragi 60'	Report	Khalfan 33'; Koni 49'	Stadium: Toyota Stadium; Attendance: 21,251; Referee: Enrique Osses (Chile)

15 December 2011 Semifinal	Al Sadd (Qatar)	0–4	(Spain) Barcelona	Yokohama
19:30 (UTC+09:00)		Report	Adriano 25', 43'; Keita 64'; Maxwell 81'	Stadium: International Stadium Yokohama; Attendance: 66,298; Referee: Joel Aguilar (El Salvador)

18 December 2011 Match for third place	Kashiwa Reysol (Japan)	0–0 (3–5 p)	(Qatar) Al Sadd	Yokohama
16:30 (UTC+09:00)		Report		Stadium: International Stadium Yokohama; Attendance: 60,527; Referee: Noumandiez Doué (Ivory Coast)
	Penalties
	Jorge Wagner (penalty scored); Sawa (penalty scored); Hayashi (penalty missed); Otani (penalty scored)		(penalty scored) Niang; (penalty scored) Keïta; (penalty scored) Majid; (penalty scored) Al Haidos; (penalty scored) Belhadj

== Squad information ==
=== Playing statistics ===
No.	Pos	Nat	Player	Total		Qatar Stars League		Emir of Qatar Cup		Crown Prince Cup		Champions League		Other (Note: Includes the Sheikh Jassim Cup and FIFA Club World Cup)	
No.	Pos	Nat	Player	Apps	Goals	Apps	Goals	Apps	Goals	Apps	Goals	Apps	Goals	Apps	Goals
Goalkeepers
1	GK	(Qatar) QAT	Saad Al Sheeb	1	0	1	0	0	0	0	0	0	0	0	0
30	GK	(Qatar) QAT	Mohamed Saqr	28	0	21	0	0	0	0	0	4	0	3	0
Defenders
3	DF	(Qatar) QAT	Abdelkarim Hassan	10	0	9	0	0	0	0	0	1	0	0	0
5	DF	(Qatar) QAT	Almahdi Ali Mukhtar	3	0	3	0	0	0	0	0	0	0	0	0
6	DF	(Qatar) QAT	Mohammed Kasola	22	1	16	1	0	0	0	0	4	0	2	0
8	DF	(Qatar) QAT	Mesaad Al-Hamad	21	1	19	1	0	0	0	0	1	0	1	0
19	DF	(Qatar) QAT	Nasser Nabeel	11	1	8	1	0	0	0	0	3	0	0	0
21	DF	(Qatar) QAT	Abdulla Koni	26	1	20	0	0	0	0	0	3	0	3	1
26	DF	(Qatar) QAT	Taher Zakaria	14	1	8	1	0	0	0	0	4	0	2	0
32	DF	(Qatar) QAT	Ibrahim Majid	15	0	9	0	0	0	0	0	3	0	3	0
40	DF	(South Korea) KOR	Lee Jung-Soo	22	1	15	1	0	0	0	0	4	0	3	0
80	DF	(Qatar) QAT	Saleh Al Zuwaidy	3	0	3	0	0	0	0	0	0	0	0	0
Midfielders
2	MF	(Qatar) QAT	Dheyab Al-Annabi	1	0	1	0	0	0	0	0	0	0	0	0
10	MF	(Qatar) QAT	Mohammed Al Yazeedi	21	0	17	0	0	0	0	0	2	0	2	0
14	MF	(Qatar) QAT	Khalfan Ibrahim	24	9	17	8	0	0	0	0	4	1	3	0
15	MF	(Qatar) QAT	Talal Al-Bloushi	24	0	18	0	0	0	0	0	4	0	2	0
25	MF	(Qatar) QAT	Wesam Rizik	15	1	9	1	0	0	0	0	3	0	3	0
27	MF	(Qatar) QAT	Jasser Yahya	1	0	1	0	0	0	0	0	0	0	0	0
39	MF	(Algeria) ALG	Nadir Belhadj	28	2	21	2	0	0	0	0	4	0	3	0
93	MF	(Qatar) QAT	Helal Mohammed	1	0	1	0	0	0	0	0	0	0	0	0
Forwards
7	FW	(Qatar) QAT	Yusef Ahmed	16	4	14	4	0	0	0	0	0	0	2	0
9	FW	(Senegal) SEN	Mamadou Niang	19	6	13	4	0	0	0	0	3	2	3	0
11	FW	(Qatar) QAT	Hassan Al Haidos	19	2	13	2	0	0	0	0	3	0	3	0
16	FW	(Qatar) QAT	Abdulaziz Rashid Al Ansari	3	0	3	0	0	0	0	0	0	0	0	0
17	FW	(Qatar) QAT	Magid Mohamed	17	6	17	6	0	0	0	0	0	0	0	0
18	FW	(Qatar) QAT	Fahad Saket	2	0	2	0	0	0	0	0	0	0	0	0
Players transferred out during the season
20	FW	(Qatar) QAT	Ali Afif	16	2	12	2	0	0	0	0	3	0	1	0
12	MF	(Ivory Coast) CIV	Abdul Kader Keïta	15	2	9	0	0	0	0	0	3	1	3	1

Last updated: 20 November 2017
Source: fr.soccerway.com

=== Goalscorers ===
Includes all competitive matches. The list is sorted alphabetically by surname when total goals are equal.

No.	Nat.	Player	Pos.	QSL	QEC	CPC	CL 1	SJC	CWC	TOTAL
14	(Qatar)	Khalfan Ibrahim	MF	8	1	2	0	0	1	12
9	(Senegal)	Mamadou Niang	FW	4	1	3	3	0	0	11
17	(Qatar)	Magid Mohamed	FW	6	0	0	0	0	0	6
7	(Qatar)	Yusef Ahmed	FW	4	1	0	0	0	0	5
20	(Qatar)	Ali Afif	FW	2	0	0	0	0	0	2
39	(Algeria)	Nadir Belhadj	DF	2	0	0	0	0	0	2
11	(Qatar)	Hassan Al Haidos	FW	2	0	0	0	0	0	2
12	(Ivory Coast)	Abdul Kader Keïta	MF	0	1	0	1	0	0	2
25	(Qatar)	Wesam Rizik	MF	1	1	0	0	0	0	2
40	(South Korea)	Lee Jung-Soo	DF	1	0	0	0	0	0	1
6	(Qatar)	Mohammed Kasola	DF	1	0	0	0	0	0	1
8	(Qatar)	Mesaad Al-Hamad	DF	1	0	0	0	0	0	1
19	(Qatar)	Nasser Nabeel	DF	1	0	0	0	0	0	1
21	(Qatar)	Abdulla Koni	DF	0	0	0	0	0	1	1
26	(Qatar)	Taher Zakaria	DF	1	0	0	0	0	0	1
Own Goals				1	0	0	1	0	0	2
Totals				35	5	5	8	0	2	55

== Transfers ==
=== In ===
Date	Pos	Player	From club	Transfer fee	Source
6 September 2011	FW	(Senegal) Mamadou Niang	(Turkey) Fenerbahçe	€7,500,000	

=== Out ===
Date	Pos	Player	To club	Transfer fee	Source
January 2012	MF	(Qatar) Dheyab Al-Annabi	(Qatar) El Jaish	loan	
January 2012	FW	(Qatar) Ali Afif	(Qatar) Lekhwiya	loan	
January 2012	FW	(Brazil) Leandro	Al Rayyan	loan	

== Notes ==
1. The AFC Disciplinary Committee decided to award the quarterfinal first leg to Al-Sadd against Sepahan as a 3–0 forfeit win after Sepahan were found guilty of fielding an ineligible player. The match originally ended 1–0 to Sepahan.
