= 2011 FIFA Club World Cup squads =

The 2011 FIFA Club World Cup took place in Toyota and Yokohama, Japan, from 8 December to 18 December 2011. The final 23-man squads had to be submitted by 28 November, with all members of the final squad taken from a provisional list of 30 players. All players were required to be registered with squad numbers between 1 and 23, unless they were registered for their domestic league with a different number. In the event of an injury to one of the players on the final list, that player could be replaced with a player from the provisional list no less than 24 hours before his team's first match in the competition. Santos released their preliminary squad on 29 October, which was cut down to 23 on 28 November. Auckland City added their squad on 24 November. Monterrey announced their 2011 FIFA Club World Cup squad on 30 November on their official website.

== Al-Sadd ==
Manager: (Uruguay) Jorge Fossati

Note: Flags indicate national team as defined under FIFA eligibility rules; some limited exceptions apply. Players may hold more than one non-FIFA nationality.

No.	Pos.	Nation	Player
1	GK	QAT	Saad Al Sheeb
3	DF	ALG	Nadir Belhadj
4	DF	KOR	Lee Jung-Soo
5	MF	QAT	Wesam Rizik
6	DF	QAT	Mohammed Kasola
7	FW	QAT	Yusef Ahmed
8	DF	QAT	Mesaad Al-Hamad
9	FW	SEN	Mamadou Niang
10	MF	QAT	Mohammed Al-Yazeedi
11	FW	QAT	Hassan Al Haidos
12	FW	CIV	Abdul Kader Keïta
13	DF	QAT	Ibrahim Majid

No.	Pos.	Nation	Player
14	FW	QAT	Khalfan Ibrahim
15	MF	QAT	Talal Al-Bloushi
16	DF	QAT	Taher Zakaria
17	FW	QAT	Magid Mohamed
18	GK	QAT	Mohamed Saqr
19	GK	QAT	Muhannad Naim
20	FW	QAT	Ali Afif
21	DF	QAT	Abdulla Koni
25	MF	QAT	Ali Asadalla
28	DF	QAT	Nasser Nabeel
30	MF	QAT	Abdelkarim Hassan

== Auckland City ==
Manager: (Spain) Ramon Tribulietx

Note: Flags indicate national team as defined under FIFA eligibility rules; some limited exceptions apply. Players may hold more than one non-FIFA nationality.

No.	Pos.	Nation	Player
1	GK	NZL	Jacob Spoonley
3	DF	NZL	Ian Hogg
4	DF	NZL	Sam Campbell
5	DF	ESP	Ángel Berlanga
6	MF	NZL	Chad Coombes
7	DF	NZL	James Pritchett
8	MF	NZL	David Mulligan
9	FW	ESP	Manel Expósito
10	FW	CRC	Luis Corrales
11	FW	CRO	Daniel Koprivcic
12	GK	NZL	Liam Little

No.	Pos.	Nation	Player
13	MF	NZL	Alex Feneridis
14	FW	ENG	Adam Dickinson
15	MF	NZL	Ivan Vicelich (Captain)
16	MF	ESP	Albert Riera
17	MF	NZL	Adam McGeorge
18	GK	ENG	Paul Gothard
20	FW	ARG	Emiliano Tade
21	MF	ESP	Andreu Guerao
22	DF	NZL	Andrew Milne
23	DF	NZL	Simon Arms
27	DF	NZL	Thomas Doyle

== Barcelona ==
Manager: (Spain) Pep Guardiola

Note: Flags indicate national team as defined under FIFA eligibility rules; some limited exceptions apply. Players may hold more than one non-FIFA nationality.

No.	Pos.	Nation	Player
1	GK	ESP	Víctor Valdés
2	DF	BRA	Dani Alves
3	DF	ESP	Gerard Piqué
4	MF	ESP	Cesc Fàbregas
5	DF	ESP	Carles Puyol (captain)
6	MF	ESP	Xavi
7	FW	ESP	David Villa
8	MF	ESP	Andrés Iniesta
9	FW	CHI	Alexis Sánchez
10	FW	ARG	Lionel Messi
11	MF	ESP	Thiago
13	GK	ESP	José Manuel Pinto

No.	Pos.	Nation	Player
14	MF	ARG	Javier Mascherano
15	MF	MLI	Seydou Keita
16	MF	ESP	Sergio Busquets
17	FW	ESP	Pedro
18	MF	MEX	Jonathan dos Santos
19	DF	BRA	Maxwell
21	DF	BRA	Adriano
22	DF	FRA	Eric Abidal
24	DF	ESP	Andreu Fontàs
25	GK	ESP	Oier Olazábal
27	FW	ESP	Isaac Cuenca

== Espérance ==
Manager: (Tunisia) Nabil Maaloul

Note: Flags indicate national team as defined under FIFA eligibility rules; some limited exceptions apply. Players may hold more than one non-FIFA nationality.

No.	Pos.	Nation	Player
1	GK	TUN	Moez Ben Cherifia
2	MF	TUN	Zine El Abidine Souissi
3	DF	CMR	Yaya Banana
6	DF	MLI	Idrissa Coulibaly
7	FW	TUN	Khaled Ayari
8	FW	TUN	Idriss Mhirsi
9	DF	TUN	Aymen Ben Amor
10	MF	TUN	Oussama Darragi (Captain)
12	DF	TUN	Khalil Chemmam
13	FW	TUN	Taha Yassine Khenissi
15	FW	CMR	Yannick N'Djeng
16	GK	TUN	Arbi Mejri

No.	Pos.	Nation	Player
17	DF	TUN	Sameh Derbali
18	MF	TUN	Wajdi Bouazzi
19	MF	TUN	Khaled Mouelhi
20	DF	TUN	Mohamed Ben Mansour
21	MF	TUN	Mejdi Traoui
22	GK	TUN	Wassim Naouara
23	MF	TUN	Khaled Korbi
26	DF	GHA	Harrison Afful
27	MF	TUN	Safouen Ben Salem
28	MF	TUN	Youssef Msakni
29	DF	TUN	Walid Hichri

== Monterrey ==
Manager: (Mexico) Víctor Manuel Vucetich

Note: Flags indicate national team as defined under FIFA eligibility rules; some limited exceptions apply. Players may hold more than one non-FIFA nationality.

No.	Pos.	Nation	Player
1	GK	MEX	Jonathan Orozco
2	DF	MEX	Severo Meza
4	DF	MEX	Ricardo Osorio
5	DF	MEX	Dárvin Chávez
6	DF	MEX	Héctor Morales
7	MF	MEX	Jesús Manuel Corona
8	MF	MEX	Luis Ernesto Pérez (Captain)
9	FW	MEX	Aldo de Nigris
11	FW	MEX	Sergio Santana
12	GK	MEX	Jesús Dautt
13	FW	MEX	Abraham Darío Carreño
14	MF	MEX	César de la Peña

No.	Pos.	Nation	Player
15	DF	ARG	José María Basanta
16	MF	MEX	Luis Madrigal
17	MF	MEX	Jesús Zavala
18	MF	ARG	Neri Cardozo
19	FW	ARG	César Delgado
20	MF	ECU	Walter Ayoví
21	DF	MEX	Hiram Mier
22	FW	MEX	Marcelo Cazaubón
23	GK	MEX	Juan de Dios Ibarra
24	DF	MEX	Sergio Pérez
26	FW	CHI	Humberto Suazo

== Santos ==
Manager: (Brazil) Muricy Ramalho

Note: Flags indicate national team as defined under FIFA eligibility rules; some limited exceptions apply. Players may hold more than one non-FIFA nationality.

No.	Pos.	Nation	Player
1	GK	BRA	Rafael
2	DF	BRA	Edu Dracena (captain)
3	DF	BRA	Léo
4	DF	BRA	Danilo
5	MF	BRA	Arouca
6	DF	BRA	Durval
7	MF	BRA	Henrique
8	MF	BRA	Elano
9	FW	BRA	Borges
10	MF	BRA	Ganso
11	FW	BRA	Neymar
12	GK	BRA	Aranha

No.	Pos.	Nation	Player
13	DF	BRA	Bruno Aguiar
14	DF	BRA	Bruno Rodrigo
15	MF	BRA	Anderson Carvalho
16	DF	BRA	Vinicius Simon
17	MF	BRA	Felipe Anderson
18	MF	BRA	Ibson
19	FW	BRA	Alan Kardec
20	FW	COL	Wason Rentería
21	DF	BRA	Pará
22	FW	BRA	Diogo
23	GK	BRA	Vladimir

== Kashiwa Reysol ==
Manager: (Brazil) Nelsinho Baptista

Note: Flags indicate national team as defined under FIFA eligibility rules; some limited exceptions apply. Players may hold more than one non-FIFA nationality.

No.	Pos.	Nation	Player
1	GK	JPN	Kazushige Kirihata
2	DF	JPN	Takanori Nakajima
3	DF	JPN	Naoya Kondo
4	DF	JPN	Hiroki Sakai
5	DF	JPN	Tatsuya Masushima
6	DF	KOR	Park Dong-Hyuk
7	MF	JPN	Hidekazu Otani (captain)
8	MF	JPN	Masakatsu Sawa
9	FW	JPN	Hideaki Kitajima
10	MF	BRA	Leandro Domingues
11	FW	JPN	Ryohei Hayashi
13	MF	JPN	Akihiro Hyodo

No.	Pos.	Nation	Player
15	MF	BRA	Jorge Wagner
16	GK	JPN	Koji Inada
17	MF	PRK	An Yong-Hak
18	MF	JPN	Junya Tanaka
19	FW	JPN	Masato Kudo
20	MF	JPN	Akimi Barada
21	GK	JPN	Takanori Sugeno
22	DF	JPN	Wataru Hashimoto
28	MF	JPN	Ryoichi Kurisawa
29	MF	JPN	Koki Mizuno
32	MF	JPN	Ryosuke Yamanaka
