= 2011 AFC Champions League final =

- Event: 2011 AFC Champions League
Jeonbuk Hyundai Motors	Al-Sadd
(South Korea)	(Qatar)
2	2
- Al-Sadd won 4–2 on penalties
- Date: 5 November 2011
- Venue: Jeonju World Cup Stadium, Jeonju
- AFC Man of the Match: Abdul Kader Keïta (Al-Sadd)
- Fans' Man of the Match: Mohamed Saqr (Al-Sadd)
- Referee: Ravshan Irmatov (Uzbekistan)
- Attendance: 41,805
- Weather: Rainy; 7 °C (45 °F); 60% humidity

The 2011 AFC Champions League final was a football match which was played on Saturday, 5 November 2011, to determine the champion of the 2011 AFC Champions League. It was the final of the 30th edition of the top-level Asian club tournament organized by the Asian Football Confederation (AFC), and the 9th under the current AFC Champions League title.

The game was contested between by Al-Sadd of Qatar and Jeonbuk Hyundai Motors of South Korea. This was the first AFC Champions League final involving a Qatari club since Al-Sadd themselves in 1989, during the Asian Club Championship era. Al-Sadd won 4–2 on penalties, after a 2–2 draw following extra time. As Asian champions, they qualified to enter the quarter-finals of the 2011 FIFA Club World Cup in Japan as the AFC representative.

== Qualified teams ==
In the following table, finals until 2002 were in the Asian Club Championship era, since 2003 were in the AFC Champions League era.

Team	Previous finals appearances (bold indicates winners)
(South Korea) Jeonbuk Hyundai Motors	1 (**2006**)
(Qatar) Al-Sadd	1 (**1989**)

== Venue ==
The AFC decided that the final would be hosted by one of the finalists. This format is a change from the 2009 and 2010 editions, where the final was played at a neutral venue. On 7 June 2011, the draw for the quarter-finals, semi-finals and final was made. For the final, the winner of semi-final 2 (played between the winners of quarter-finals 2 and 1) would be the home team, while the winner of semi-final 1 (played between the winners of quarter-finals 4 and 3) would be the away team. Therefore, Jeonbuk Hyundai Motors were the home team, and Al-Sadd were the away team. The name of the stadium is Jeonju World Cup Stadium which is located in Jeonju, Republic of Korea which was also one of the main stadiums during 2002 FIFA World Cup.

== Road to final ==
(South Korea) Jeonbuk Hyundai Motors				Round	(Qatar) Al-Sadd			
Opponent	Result			Qualifying play-off	Opponent	Result		
Bye				Semi-final	(Syria) Al-Ittihad	5–1 (H)		
Bye				Final	(India) Dempo	2–0 (H)		
Opponent	Result			Group stage	Opponent	Result		
(China) Shandong Luneng	1–0 (H)			Matchday 1	(Iran) Esteghlal	1–1 (A)		
(Indonesia) Arema	4–0 (A)			Matchday 2	(Uzbekistan) Pakhtakor	2–1 (H)		
(Japan) Cerezo Osaka	0–1 (A)			Matchday 3	(Saudi Arabia) Al-Nassr	1–0 (H)		
(Japan) Cerezo Osaka	1–0 (H)			Matchday 4	(Saudi Arabia) Al-Nassr	1–1 (A)		
(China) Shandong Luneng	2–1 (A)			Matchday 5	(Iran) Esteghlal	2–2 (H)		
(Indonesia) Arema	6–0 (H)			Matchday 6	(Uzbekistan) Pakhtakor	1–1 (A)		
**Group G winner**: Team / Pld / W / D / L / GF / GA / GD / Pts; (South Korea) **Jeonbuk Hyundai Motors** / 6 / 5 / 0 / 1 / 14 / 2 / +12 / **15**; (Japan) Cerezo Osaka / 6 / 4 / 0 / 2 / 11 / 4 / +7 / **12**; (China) Shandong Luneng / 6 / 2 / 1 / 3 / 9 / 8 / +1 / **7**; (Indonesia) Arema / 6 / 0 / 1 / 5 / 2 / 22 / −20 / **1**				Final standings	**Group B winner**: Team / Pld / W / D / L / GF / GA / GD / Pts; (Qatar) **Al-Sadd** / 6 / 2 / 4 / 0 / 8 / 6 / +2 / **10**; (Saudi Arabia) Al-Nassr / 6 / 2 / 2 / 2 / 10 / 7 / +3 / **8**; (Iran) Esteghlal / 6 / 2 / 2 / 2 / 11 / 10 / +1 / **8**; (Uzbekistan) Pakhtakor / 6 / 1 / 2 / 3 / 8 / 14 / −6 / **5**			
Opponent	Agg.	1st leg	2nd leg	Knockout stage	Opponent	Agg.	1st leg	2nd leg
(China) Tianjin Teda	3–0 (H) (one-leg match)			Round of 16	(Saudi Arabia) Al-Shabab	1–0 (H) (one-leg match)		
(Japan) Cerezo Osaka	9–5	3–4 (A)	6–1 (H)	Quarterfinals	(Iran) Sepahan	4–2	3–0 (awd.) (A)	1–2 (H)
(Saudi Arabia) Al-Ittihad	5–3	3–2 (A)	2–1 (H)	Semifinals	(South Korea) Suwon Samsung Bluewings	2–1	2–0 (A)	0–1 (H)

== Summary ==
Jeonbuk had the first attempt on target after four minutes when Eninho saw a dipping shot from 25 yards punched away by Saqr. Mamadou Niang fired well over the top six minutes later before Park's cross from the left was glanced into Saqr's arms by Jeon Kwang-hwan. Jeonbuk then took the lead in the 17th minute. Eninho was brought down on the left edge of the box but the Brazilian picked himself to fire a brilliant free-kick into the far side of Saqr's net.

The Al Sadd keeper gathered Eninho's low shot shortly afterwards before the Qataris silenced the raucous home crowd just before the half-hour mark. Keita flighted a cross towards Khalfan Ibrahim on the edge of the six-yard box and as the midfielder jumped with Sim, the defender flicked the ball past Kim Min-Sik in the Jeonbuk goal and the sides went in level at the break. Saqr comfortably held Jeong's low shot from outside the box as the second-half got under way before Kim Dong-Chan was presented with a sight of goal but the substitute could only sidefoot straight at the keeper from 10 yards. Eninho came close to grabbing his second goal of the game in the 57th minute. Having scored twice from corners against Al Ittihad in the semi-final, the Brazilian tried to repeat the trick but Saqr managed to tip his set-piece from the right against the bar. Al Sadd then took the lead in the 63rd minute when a low cross from the left picked out Keita and the striker spun and fired into the bottom corner from just inside the box.

Jeonbuk came agonisingly close to a swift reply six minutes later. Kim Dong-chan met Eninho's in-swinging corner with a header that came back off the far post and the midfielder's subsequent overhead kick was cleared off the line before Jeong blazed over from inside the area. Head coach Choi Kang-hee then introduced Lee Dong-gook for Luiz Henrique as Jeonbuk pressed for the equaliser. Kim Dong-chan pulled a low shot wide of Saqr's goal with 10 minutes remaining before the Al Sadd keeper did brilliantly to push Jeong's low drive from 12 yards through a crowd of players onto the post with three minutes to go.

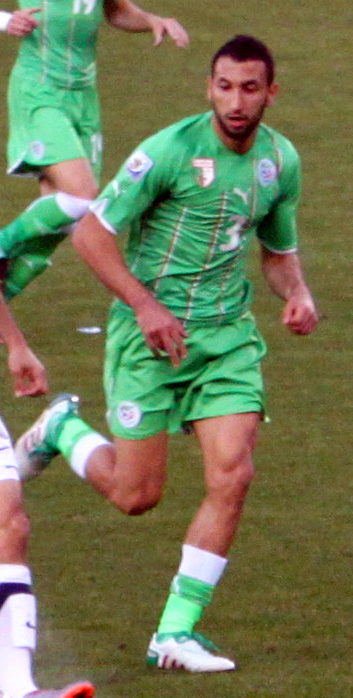
Nadir Belhadj who converted the winning penalty

Urged on by a noisy home crowd, Jeonbuk piled on the pressure in the closing stages and grabbed a dramatic equaliser in stoppage-time when Eninho's corner from the right was headed in from close range at the back post by substitute Lee Sung-hyun as the stadium erupted and the game went into extra time. Lee Dong-gook wasted a great chance in the 101st minute when the ball fell to the striker unmarked eight yards from goal but he sliced horribly wide. Jeong headed Eninho's cross off target two minutes into the second period of extra time before Saqr denied him with a fantastic save with seven minutes to go, pushing his shot past the post after Abdulla Koni's slip had let the Jeonbuk striker in. The home side were again foiled by the woodwork shortly afterwards when Eninho's corner hit and Al Sadd defender but bounced off the base of the post.

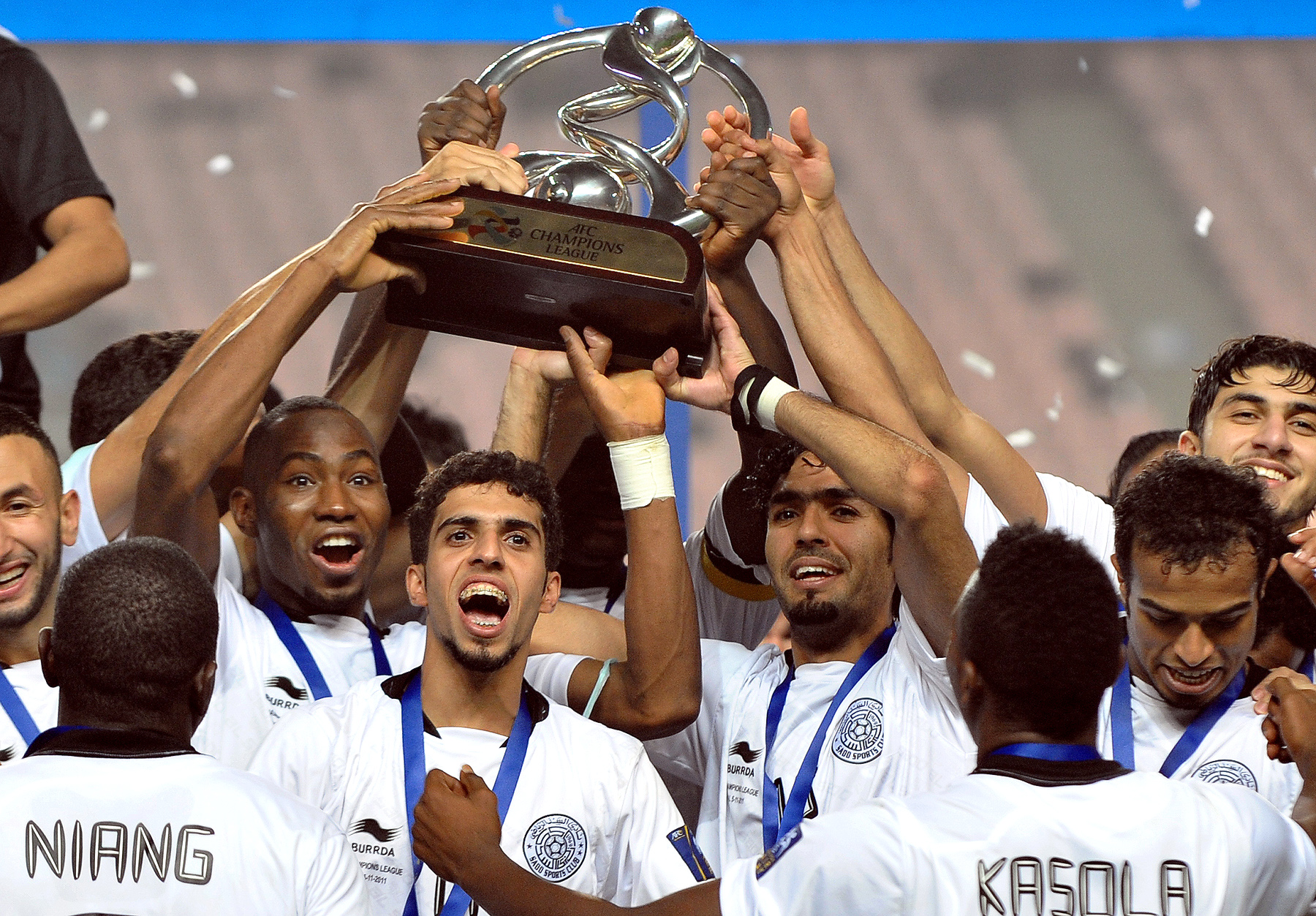
Al Sadd players celebrating their second time winning the ACL trophy

Substitute Afif collected a second booking a minute from the end for bringing down Choi Chul-soon but Al Sadd held on for penalties. After the first three spot-kicks all found the back of the net, Kim Dong-chan had his effort saved by Saqr before Al Sadd's Lee Jung-soo calmly strode up but sidefooted his penalty against the underside of the bar. Jeonbuk could not capitalize on this as Park blasted his shot straight at Saqr. Ibrahim Majid then blasted into the corner and Kim Sang-sik scored but Belhadj displayed fine composure to fire home the winning penalty.

Belhadj held his nerve in front of over 41,000 spectators – a club record – to drive home the crucial spot kick in the shootout as Al Sadd became the first Qatar side to win the AFC Champions League and book their place at the 2011 FIFA Club World Cup. Nadir Belhadj converted the winning penalty as Al Sadd lifted the 2011 AFC Champions League trophy following a dramatic final against Jeonbuk Hyundai Motors at the Jeonju World Cup Stadium.

== Match details ==
5 November 2011
19:00 UTC+09:00

Jeonbuk Hyundai Motors (South Korea)	2–2 (a.e.t.)	(Qatar) Al-Sadd
Eninho 17'; Lee Seung-hyun 90+2'	Report	Sim Woo-yeon 30' (o.g.); Keïta 61'
Penalties
Eninho (penalty scored); Kim Dong-chan (penalty missed); Park Won-jae (penalty missed); Kim Sang-sik (penalty scored)	2–4	(penalty scored) Niang; (penalty scored) Al-Haydos; (penalty missed) Lee Jung-soo; (penalty scored) Majid; (penalty scored) Belhadj

Jeonju World Cup Stadium, Jeonju
Attendance: 41,805
Referee: Ravshan Irmatov (Uzbekistan)

**Jeonbuk Hyundai Motors**	**Al-Sadd**

GK	21	(South Korea) Kim Min-sik
RB	25	(South Korea) Choi Chul-soon
CB	3	(South Korea) Sim Woo-yeon
CB	5	(South Korea) Son Seung-joon
LB	33	(South Korea) Park Won-jae
CM	4	(South Korea) Kim Sang-sik (c)	(yellow card) 90+5'
CM	13	(South Korea) Jung Hoon		(substituted off) 51'
RW	26	(South Korea) Seo Jung-jin		(substituted off) 71'
AM	8	(Brazil) Eninho	(yellow card) 80'
LW	9	(South Korea) Jeong Shung-hoon
CF	10	(Brazil) Luiz Henrique		(substituted off) 71'
**Substitutes**
GK	41	(South Korea) Lee Bum-soo
MF	7	(South Korea) Kim Young-woo
MF	11	(South Korea) Lee Seung-hyun		(substituted on) 71'
MF	18	(China) Huang Bowen
MF	29	(South Korea) Lee Kwang-hyun
FW	15	(South Korea) Kim Dong-chan		(substituted on) 51'
FW	20	(South Korea) Lee Dong-gook		(substituted on) 71'
**Manager**
(South Korea) Choi Kang-hee

GK	30	(Qatar) Mohamed Saqr
RB	21	(Qatar) Abdulla Koni (c)
CB	40	(South Korea) Lee Jung-soo
CB	6	(Qatar) Mohammed Kasola	(yellow card) 21'	(substituted off) 53'
LB	32	(Qatar) Ibrahim Majid	(yellow card) 73'
CM	25	(Qatar) Wesam Rizik
CM	15	(Qatar) Talal Al-Bloushi	(yellow card) 66'
RW	12	(Ivory Coast) Kader Keïta	(yellow card) 52'	(substituted off) 90+5'
AM	14	(Qatar) Khalfan Ibrahim		(substituted off) 74'
LW	3	(Algeria) Nadir Belhadj
CF	9	(Senegal) Mamadou Niang
**Substitutes**
GK	1	(Qatar) Saad Al Sheeb
DF	8	(Qatar) Mesaad Al-Hamad
DF	19	(Qatar) Nasser Nabeel
DF	20	(Qatar) Ali Afif	(yellow card) 100' (yellow-red card) 120'	(substituted on) 90+5'
DF	26	(Qatar) Taher Zakaria	(yellow card) 80'	(substituted on) 53'
MF	10	(Qatar) Mohammed Al Yazeedi
FW	11	(Qatar) Hassan Al-Haydos	(yellow card) 89'	(substituted on) 74'
**Manager**
(Uruguay) Jorge Fossati

AFC's Man of the Match:
Kader Keïta (Al-Sadd)

Assistant referees:
Abdukhamidullo Rasulov (Uzbekistan)
Bahadyr Kochkarov (Kyrgyzstan)
Fourth official:
Tan Hai (China P.R.)

== See also ==
- 2011 AFC Champions League
- 2011 FIFA Club World Cup
