= 2012 Qatar Crown Prince Cup =

كأس سمو ولي العهد

Tournament details
- Country: Qatar
- Dates: April 21–26
- Teams: 4

Final positions
- Champions: Al Rayyan (4th title)
- Runners-up: Al-Sadd

Tournament statistics
- Top goal scorer(s): Mamadou Niang (3 goals)

The 2012 Qatar Crown Prince Cup will be the 18th edition of the Qatar Crown Prince Cup and will take place from April 21 to 26. The cup will contested by the top four finishers in 2011–12 Qatar Stars League.

== 2012 Participants ==
- Lekhwiya : 2011–12 Qatar Stars League champions
- El Jaish : 2011–12 Qatar Stars League runner-up
- Al Rayyan : 2011–12 Qatar Stars League 3rd place
- Al-Sadd : 2011–12 Qatar Stars League 4th place

== Bracket ==
Semi-finals
2012-04-21 - Doha
(Qatar) Lekhwiya	2
(Qatar) Al-Sadd	4
2012-04-22 - Doha
(Qatar) El Jaish	2
(Qatar) Al Rayyan	3

Final
2012-04-26 - Doha
(Qatar) Al-Sadd	1 (4)
(Qatar) Al Rayyan	1 (5)

== Match details ==
=== Semi-final ===
April 21, 2012
18:45 (UTC+03:00)

Lekhwiya	2 – 4	Al-Sadd
Baba Malick (red card) 38'; Nam Tae-Hee 52' (pen.); Madjid Bougherra 84'	Report	Mamadou Niang 35' (pen.), 38', 94'; Khalfan Ibrahim 74'

Suhaim bin Hamad Stadium, Doha
Referee: Fredy Fautrel (France)

April 22, 2012
18:45 (UTC+03:00)

El Jaish	2 – 3	Al Rayyan
Anderson Martins 33'; Abdulqadir Ilyas 58'	Report	Fábio César 53', 90'; Afonso Alves 71' (pen.)

Suhaim bin Hamad Stadium, Doha
Referee: Artur Soares Dias (Portugal)

=== Final ===
26 April 2012
18:45 (UTC+03:00)

Al-Sadd	1 – 1	Al Rayyan
Khalfan Ibrahim 61'	Report	Jaralla Al Marri 90+1'
Penalties
Khalfan (penalty scored); Yazeedi (penalty missed); Majid (penalty scored); Keïta (penalty scored); Belhadj (penalty scored)	4 – 5	(penalty scored) César; (penalty scored) Tabata; (penalty scored) Nathan; (penalty scored) Ismail; (penalty scored) Alves

Suhaim bin Hamad Stadium, Doha
Attendance: 23,000
Referee: Banjar Al Dossari (Qatar)

Al-Sadd	Al Rayyan

Al Sadd: 3–4–2–1
GK	30	(Qatar) Mohamed Saqr
DF	6	(Qatar) Mohammed Kasola
DF	21	(Qatar) Abdulla Koni
DF	40	(South Korea) Lee Jung-Soo
DM	39	(Algeria) Nadir Belhadj
DM	32	(Qatar) Ibrahim Majid	(yellow card) 70'
MF	19	(Qatar) Nasser Nabeel
MF	15	(Qatar) Talal Al-Bloushi	(yellow card) 41'	(substituted off) 85'
SS	14	(Qatar) Khalfan Ibrahim
SS	17	(Qatar) Magid Mohamed	(substituted off) 63'
FW	9	(Senegal) Mamadou Niang
Substitutes
FW	7	(Qatar) Yusef Ali
FW	12	(Ivory Coast) Abdul Kader Keïta	(substituted on) 63'	(yellow card) 90'
FW	11	(Qatar) Hassan Al-Haydos
MF	6	(Qatar) Mohammed Al-Yazeedi	(substituted on) 85'
DF	5	(Qatar) Almahdi Ali Mukhtar
DF	8	(Qatar) Mesaad Al-Hamad
GK	22	(Qatar) Muhannad Naim
Manager
(Uruguay) Jorge Fossati

Al Rayyan: 4–2–3–1
GK	30	(Qatar) Omar Bari
DF	55	(Brazil) Nathan Otávio
DF	13	(South Korea) Cho Yong-Hyung
DF	25	(Qatar) Mosaab Mahmoud
DF	19	(Qatar) Murad Naji	(substituted off) 87'
DM	17	(Qatar) Daniel Goma
DM	8	(Qatar) Abdulla Afifa
MF	27	(Qatar) Younes Ali	(yellow card) 29'	(substituted off) 74'
MF	7	(Qatar) Fábio César
MF	10	(Brazil) Rodrigo Tabata
FW	9	(Brazil) Afonso Alves
Substitutes
FW	20	(Qatar) Jaralla Al Marri	(substituted on) 87'
FW	26	(Qatar) Mohammed Elneel
MF	2	(Qatar) Waheed Mohammed Taher
DF	3	(Qatar) Abdulrahman Mesbeh
DF	5	(Qatar) Marcone
DF	12	(Qatar) Hamid Ismail	(substituted on) 74'
GK	99	(Qatar) Mohammed Izzeldin
Manager
(Uruguay) Diego Aguirre

Man of the Match:
Khalfan Ibrahim (Qatar)

Qatar Crown Prince Cup
2012 Winners

Al Rayyan
4th Title
