= Thamer =

Thamer or Thamir is a masculine given name of Arabic origin. Notable people with the name include:

== Given name ==
=== Thamer ===
- Thamer Kamal Ali (born 1988), Qatari middle-distance runner
- Thamer Chaim (born 1945), Brazilian weightlifter
- Thamer Enad (born 1970), Kuwait football manager
- Thamer Nayef al-Hathal (born 1973), Iraqi politician
- Thamer Jamal (born 1990), Sudanese footballer
- Thamer Al-Khaibari (born 2005), Saudi Arabian football player
- Thamer Al-Meshauqeh (born 1991), Saudi Arabian footballer
- Thamer Mohammed (born 1984), Emirati footballer
- Thamer Ali Sabah Al-Salem Al-Sabah (born 1972), Kuwaiti politician
- Thamer Al-Sabhan (born 1967), Saudi Arabian politician
- Thamer Shaker (born 1975), Saudi businessman
- Thamer Yousif (born 1953), Iraqi and ethnic Assyrian football player

=== Thamir ===
- Thamir Ghadhban (born 1945), Iraqi politician
- Thamir bin Abdulaziz Al Saud (1937–1958), Saudi royal

== Middle name ==
- Hamad bin Thamer Al Thani, Qatari royal and businessman
