= Annabi =

Annabi is the surname of the following people

- Abu Ubaidah Yusef al-Annabi (born 1969), Algerian jihadi
- Ali Annabi (born 1939), Tunisian fencer
- Amina Annabi (born 1962), French-Tunisian singer-songwriter
- Dheyab Al-Annabi (born 1990), Qatari footballer
- Hédi Annabi (1943–2010), Tunisian diplomat

== See also ==
- Roqq-e Annabi, Iranian village
- Anabi, town in India
