= Roqq-e Annabi =

Roqq-e Annabi رق عنابي
- Village
- Location within Iran
- Coordinates: 33°00′02.9″N 59°29′49.6″E
- Country: Iran
- Province: South Khorasan
- County: Birjand
- Bakhsh: Central
- Rural District: Kahshang

Population (2016)
  - Total: 12
- Time zone: UTC+3:30 (IRST)
  - Summer (DST): UTC+4:30 (IRDT)

Roqq-e Annabi (Persian: رق عنابي, also Romanized as Roqq-e ‘Annābī) is a village in Kahshang Rural District, in the Central District of Birjand County, South Khorasan Province, Iran. At the 2016 census, its population was 12, in 5 families.
