= Ibrahim Awal =

Qatari footballer (born 1990)

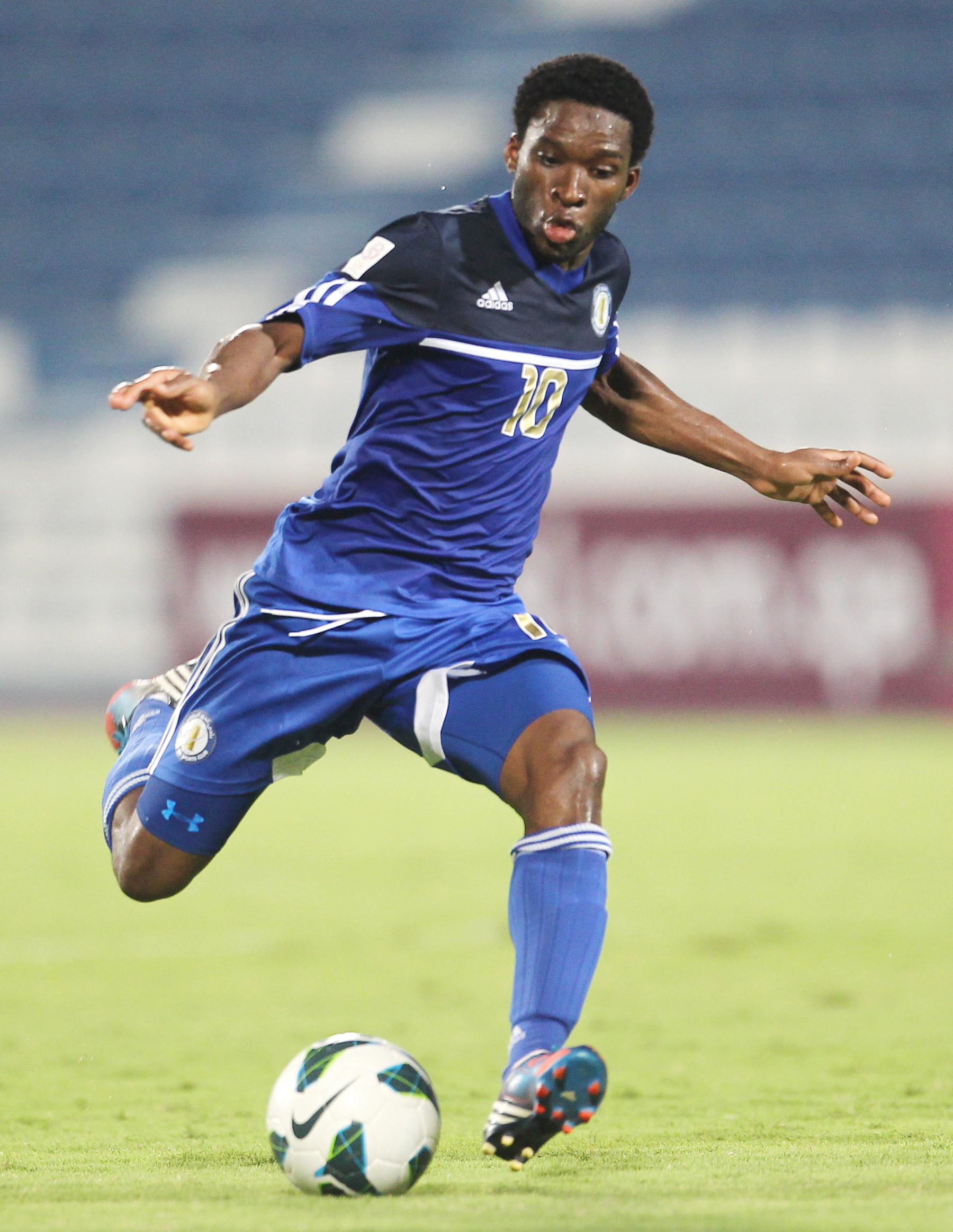
Ibrahim Awal

Ibrahim Awal (born 20 July 1990) is a Qatari footballer who played as a striker for Al-Khor SC.
