= Helal Mohammed =

Qatari footballer (born 1993)

Personal information
- Full name: Helal Mohammed Ibrahim
- Date of birth: 23 May 1993 (age 33)
- Place of birth: Qatar
- Position: Full back

Team information
- Current team: Al Ahli
- Number: 12

Senior career*
Years	Team	Apps	(Gls)
2012–2016	Al-Sadd	0	(0)
2013–2016	→ Al-Khor (loan)	51	(1)
2016–2017	Umm Salal	23	(4)
2017–2025	Al-Khor	99	(7)
2020	→ Al-Arabi (loan)	5	(0)
2022–2025	→ Al-Arabi (loan)	53	(0)
2025–	Al Ahli	9	(0)
- * Club domestic league appearances and goals as of 17 January 2026

Helal Mohammed (Arabic:هلال محمد) (born 23 May 1993) is a Qatari footballer who currently plays for Al Ahli.
