= Thamer Nayef al-Hathal =

Iraqi mayor (born 1973)

- Born: 1973 (age 52–53)
- Citizenship: Iraq
- Education: Business graduate
- Alma mater: Baghdad University
- Occupation: Mayor
- Known for: Mayor of Nukhayb, Iraq
- Relatives: Sheik Meta'ab al-Hathal (uncle)

Thamer Nayef al-Hathal (born 1973) is, as of 2004, the mayor of the town of Nukhayb, Al Anbar Province, Iraq. Thamer is a business graduate of Baghdad University, and nephew of tribal chief Sheik Meta'ab al-Hathal (born 1937), who was picked up and released in a mass arrest by US forces in late 2003. Thamer was away at the time and was not arrested.
