= Thamer Jamal =

Sudanese footballer (born 1990)

Personal information
- Full name: Thamer Jamal Mohammed Osman El Ziber
- Date of birth: September 15, 1990 (age 36)
- Place of birth: Omdurman, Sudan
- Height: 1.74 m (5 ft 9 in)
- Position: Left back

Senior career*
Years	Team	Apps	(Gls)
2010–2012	Umm Salal	29	(3)
2012–2016	El Jaish	7	(0)
2013	→ Umm Salal (loan)	10	(1)
2013–2014	→ Al-Arabi (loan)	14	(1)
2014–2016	→ Umm Salal (loan)	32	(5)
2016–2020	Al-Gharafa	31	(3)
2020–2023	Al-Khor	16	(0)
2021–2022	→ Muaither (loan)	1	(0)
2023–2024	Al Bidda	1	(0)
- * Club domestic league appearances and goals as of 30 November 2020 (UTC)

Thamer Jamal Mohammed Osman El Ziber (born 15 September 1990) is a Sudanese professional footballer who plays as a left back.

On 21 May 2014, he joined Umm Salal on loan from El Jaish.
