= 2011 FIFA Club World Cup =

FIFA Club World Cup Japan 2011 presented by Toyota Toyota プレゼンツ FIFAクラブワールドカップ ジャパン2011

Tournament details
- Host country: Japan
- Dates: 8–18 December
- Teams: 7 (from 6 confederations)
- Venues: 2 (in 2 host cities)

Final positions
- Champions: (Spain) Barcelona (2nd title)
- Runners-up: (Brazil) Santos
- Third place: (Qatar) Al-Sadd
- Fourth place: (Japan) Kashiwa Reysol

Tournament statistics
- Matches played: 8
- Goals scored: 24 (3 per match)
- Attendance: 305,333 (38,167 per match)
- Top scorer(s): Adriano (Barcelona); Lionel Messi (Barcelona); 2 goals each
- Best player: Lionel Messi (Barcelona)
- Fair play award: (Spain) Barcelona

The 2011 FIFA Club World Cup (officially known as the FIFA Club World Cup Japan 2011 presented by Toyota for sponsorship reasons) was a football tournament that was played from 8 to 18 December 2011. It was the eighth edition of the FIFA Club World Cup, a FIFA-organised tournament between the winners of the six continental confederations as well as the host nation's league champions.

After the United Arab Emirates hosted the tournament in 2009 and 2010, hosting rights for the 2011 edition returned to Japan. During a visit to Japan on 23 May 2011, FIFA President Sepp Blatter confirmed that Japan would remain as hosts of the tournament despite the 2011 Tōhoku earthquake and tsunami.

Defending champions Internazionale did not qualify as they were eliminated in the quarter-finals of the 2010–11 UEFA Champions League. The eventual winners of that competition, Spanish club Barcelona, went on to win the Club World Cup, winning 4–0 in the semi-finals against Qatari club Al-Sadd before another victory by the same margin against Brazilian club Santos in the final.

== Host bids ==
Tournament host bids for both 2011 and 2012 FIFA Club World Cups were announced on 27 May 2008 during their meeting in Sydney, Australia.

- Japan
- Spain
- Bolivia
- Peru
- Argentina

== Qualified teams ==
Location of teams of the 2011 FIFA Club World Cup

Team	Confederation	Qualification	Participation (bold indicates winners)
Entering in the semi-finals
(Spain) Barcelona	UEFA	Winners of the 2010–11 UEFA Champions League	3rd (Previous: 2006, **2009**)
(Brazil) Santos	CONMEBOL	Winners of the 2011 Copa Libertadores	Debut
Entering in the quarter-finals
(Qatar) Al-Sadd	AFC	Winners of the 2011 AFC Champions League	Debut
(Tunisia) Espérance de Tunis	CAF	Winners of the 2011 CAF Champions League	Debut
(Mexico) Monterrey	CONCACAF	Winners of the 2010–11 CONCACAF Champions League	Debut
Entering in the play-off for quarter-finals
(New Zealand) Auckland City	OFC	Winners of the 2010–11 OFC Champions League	3rd (Previous: 2006, 2009)
(Japan) Kashiwa Reysol	AFC (host)	Winners of the 2011 J.League Division 1	Debut

== Match officials ==
Appointed referees are:

Confederation	Referee	Assistant referees
AFC	(Uzbekistan) Ravshan Irmatov	(Uzbekistan) Abdukhamidullo Rasulov (Kyrgyzstan) Bakhadyr Kochkarov
AFC	(Japan) Yuichi Nishimura	(Japan) Toshiyuki Nagi (Japan) Toru Sagara
CAF	(Ivory Coast) Noumandiez Doué	(Ivory Coast) Songuifolo Yeo (Senegal) Djibril Camara
CONCACAF	(El Salvador) Joel Aguilar	(El Salvador) William Torres Mejia (El Salvador) Juan Francisco Zumba
CONMEBOL	(Chile) Enrique Osses	(Chile) Francisco Mondria (Chile) Carlos Alexis Astroza
OFC	(New Zealand) Peter O'Leary	(New Zealand) Jan-Hendrik Hintz (Fiji) Ravinesh Kumar
UEFA	(Italy) Nicola Rizzoli	(Italy) Renato Faverani (Italy) Andrea Stefani

== Squads ==
Each team had to submit a squad of 23 players, three of them goalkeepers.

== Venues ==
Yokohama and Toyota were the two cities that served as venues for the 2011 FIFA Club World Cup.

Toyota	Yokohama
Toyota Stadium	International Stadium Yokohama
35°05′05″N 137°10′15″E	35°30′35″N 139°36′20″E
Capacity: 45,000	Capacity: 72,327
Location of the host cities of the 2011 FIFA Club World Cup.

== Matches ==
A draw was held on 17 November in Nagoya (Japan) to decide the "positions" of the three teams entering the quarter-finals: Al-Sadd (AFC), Espérance de Tunis (CAF), and Monterrey (CONCACAF).

If a match was tied after normal playing time:

- For elimination matches, extra time would be played. If still tied after extra time, a penalty shoot-out would be held to determine the winner.
- For the matches for fifth place and third place, no extra time would be played, and the match would go straight to a penalty shoot-out to determine the winner.

Play-off for quarter-finals
8 December – Toyota
(Japan) Kashiwa Reysol	2
(New Zealand) Auckland City	0

Quarter-finals
11 December – Toyota
(Japan) Kashiwa Reysol (p)	1 (4)
(Mexico) Monterrey	1 (3)
11 December – Toyota
(Tunisia) Espérance de Tunis	1
(Qatar) Al-Sadd	2

Semi-finals
14 December – Toyota
(Japan) Kashiwa Reysol	1
(Brazil) Santos	3
15 December – Yokohama
(Qatar) Al-Sadd	0
(Spain) Barcelona	4
Match for fifth place
14 December – Toyota
(Mexico) Monterrey	3
(Tunisia) Espérance de Tunis	2

Final
18 December – Yokohama
(Brazil) Santos	0
(Spain) Barcelona	4
Match for third place
18 December – Yokohama
(Japan) Kashiwa Reysol	0 (3)
(Qatar) Al-Sadd (p)	0 (5)

All times Japan Standard Time (UTC+09:00).

=== Play-off for quarter-finals ===
8 December 2011
19:45

Kashiwa Reysol (Japan)	2–0	(New Zealand) Auckland City
Tanaka 37'; Kudo 40'	Report

Toyota Stadium, Toyota
Attendance: 18,754
Referee: Nicola Rizzoli (Italy)

=== Quarter-finals ===
11 December 2011
16:00

Espérance de Tunis (Tunisia)	1–2	(Qatar) Al-Sadd
Darragi 60'	Report	Khalfan 33'; Koni 49'

Toyota Stadium, Toyota
Attendance: 21,251
Referee: Enrique Osses (Chile)

11 December 2011
19:30

Kashiwa Reysol (Japan)	1–1 (a.e.t.)	(Mexico) Monterrey
Domingues 53'	Report	Suazo 58'
Penalties
Domingues (penalty scored); Jorge Wagner (penalty scored); Kurisawa (penalty scored); Tanaka (penalty missed); Hayashi (penalty scored)	4–3	(penalty missed) L. Pérez; (penalty scored) Suazo; (penalty scored) Ayoví; (penalty missed) Orozco; (penalty scored) Delgado

Toyota Stadium, Toyota
Attendance: 27,525
Referee: Peter O'Leary (New Zealand)

=== Match for fifth place ===
14 December 2011
16:30

Monterrey (Mexico)	3–2	(Tunisia) Espérance de Tunis
Mier 39'; De Nigris 44'; Zavala 47'	Report	N'Djeng 31'; Mouelhi 76' (pen.)

Toyota Stadium, Toyota
Attendance: 13,639
Referee: Ravshan Irmatov (Uzbekistan)

=== Semi-finals ===
14 December 2011
19:30

Kashiwa Reysol (Japan)	1–3	(Brazil) Santos
Sakai 54'	Report	Neymar 19'; Borges 24'; Danilo 63'

Toyota Stadium, Toyota
Attendance: 29,173
Referee: Nicola Rizzoli (Italy)

15 December 2011
19:30

Al-Sadd (Qatar)	0–4	(Spain) Barcelona
	Report	Adriano 25', 43'; Keita 64'; Maxwell 81'

International Stadium Yokohama, Yokohama
Attendance: 66,298
Referee: Joel Aguilar (El Salvador)

=== Match for third place ===
18 December 2011
16:30

Kashiwa Reysol (Japan)	0–0	(Qatar) Al-Sadd
	Report
Penalties
Jorge Wagner (penalty scored); Sawa (penalty scored); Hayashi (penalty missed); Otani (penalty scored)	3–5	(penalty scored) Niang; (penalty scored) Keïta; (penalty scored) Majid; (penalty scored) Al-Haydos; (penalty scored) Belhadj

International Stadium Yokohama, Yokohama
Attendance: 60,527
Referee: Noumandiez Doué (Ivory Coast)

=== Final ===
18 December 2011
19:30

Santos (Brazil)	0–4	(Spain) Barcelona
	Report	Messi 17', 82'; Xavi 24'; Fàbregas 45'

International Stadium Yokohama, Yokohama
Attendance: 68,166
Referee: Ravshan Irmatov (Uzbekistan)

== Goalscorers ==
Rank	Player	Team	Goals
1	(Brazil) Adriano	(Spain) Barcelona	2
1	(Argentina) Lionel Messi	(Spain) Barcelona	2
3	(Qatar) Khalfan Ibrahim	(Qatar) Al-Sadd	1
3	(Qatar) Abdulla Koni	(Qatar) Al-Sadd	1
3	(Brazil) Maxwell	(Spain) Barcelona	1
3	(Mali) Seydou Keita	(Spain) Barcelona	1
3	(Spain) Cesc Fàbregas	(Spain) Barcelona	1
3	(Spain) Xavi	(Spain) Barcelona	1
3	(Tunisia) Oussama Darragi	(Tunisia) Espérance de Tunis	1
3	(Tunisia) Khaled Mouelhi	(Tunisia) Espérance de Tunis	1
3	(Cameroon) Yannick N'Djeng	(Tunisia) Espérance de Tunis	1
3	(Brazil) Leandro Domingues	(Japan) Kashiwa Reysol	1
3	(Japan) Masato Kudo	(Japan) Kashiwa Reysol	1
3	(Japan) Hiroki Sakai	(Japan) Kashiwa Reysol	1
3	(Japan) Junya Tanaka	(Japan) Kashiwa Reysol	1
3	(Mexico) Aldo de Nigris	(Mexico) Monterrey	1
3	(Mexico) Hiram Mier	(Mexico) Monterrey	1
3	(Chile) Humberto Suazo	(Mexico) Monterrey	1
3	(Mexico) Jesús Zavala	(Mexico) Monterrey	1
3	(Brazil) Borges	(Brazil) Santos	1
3	(Brazil) Danilo	(Brazil) Santos	1
3	(Brazil) Neymar	(Brazil) Santos	1

== Awards ==
Adidas Golden Ball Toyota Award	Adidas Silver Ball	Adidas Bronze Ball
(Argentina) Lionel Messi (Barcelona)	(Spain) Xavi (Barcelona)	(Brazil) Neymar (Santos)
FIFA Fair Play Award
(Spain) Barcelona
