= Dheyab Al-Annabi =

Qatari footballer (born 1990)

Personal information
- Full name: Dheyab Hassan Al-Annabi
- Date of birth: 20 June 1990 (age 36)
- Place of birth: Qatar
- Position: Midfielder

Youth career
- Al Sadd

Senior career*
Years	Team	Apps	(Gls)
2010–2012	Al Sadd SC	6	(0)
2012–2014	El Jaish	9	(0)
2013–2014	→ Al-Khor (loan)	3	(0)
2014–2021	Umm Salal	103	(3)
2021	Al-Shahania		
2022–2024	Mesaimeer		
- * Club domestic league appearances and goals

Dheyab Al-Annabi (Arabic: ذياب العنابي; born 20 June 1990) is a Qatari footballer who plays as a midfielder. At the club level, he spent a substantial part of his career with Umm Salal.
