= Talal Al-Bloushi =

Qatari footballer (born 1986)

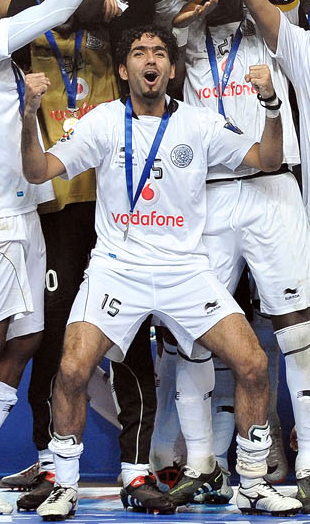
- Al-Bloushi celebrating after winning the AFC Champions League trophy with Al Sadd in 2011

Personal information
- Full name: Talal Hassan Ali Al-Bloushi
- Date of birth: May 22, 1986 (age 40)
- Place of birth: Sulaibiya, Kuwait
- Height: 1.77 m (5 ft 10 in)
- Position: Midfielder

Youth career
- 1997–1999: Al Naser
- 1999–2003: Al Sadd

Senior career*
Years	Team	Apps	(Gls)
2003–2016	Al Sadd	107	(3)
2009	→ Al-Shabab (loan)	12	(0)
2016–2018	Al Arabi		
2018–2019	Al-Markhiya		
2019	Mesaimeer		

International career
2006–2013	Qatar	64	(1)

Managerial career
- 2023–: Zakho
- * Club domestic league appearances and goals

Talal Hassan Ali Al-Bloushi (Arabic: طَلَال حَسَن عَلِيّ الْبَلُوشِيّ; born May 22, 1986) is a former footballer and current coach of Iraqi club Zakho. Born in Kuwait, he represented the Qatar national team.

== International goals ==
#	Date	Venue	Opponent	Score	Result	Competition
	September 6, 2008	Doha, Qatar	Uzbekistan	3–0	Won	2010 FIFA World Cup qualification

== Honours ==
=== Player ===
Al Sadd SC

- Qatar Stars League: 2003–04, 2005–06, 2006–07, 2012–13,
- Emir of Qatar Cup Winners: 2004–05, 2006–07, 2014, 2015, Runner-up: 2012, 2013
- Qatar Cup Winners: 2006, 2007, 2008, Runner-up: 2004, 2012, 2013,
- Qatar Super Cup / Sheikh Jassim Cup winners: 2006, 2014, Runner-up: 2012, 2015,
- Qatari Stars Cup Winners: 2010, Runner-up: 2013–14,
- AFC Champions League Elite Winners: 2011,
- FIFA Club World Cup Bronze Medalist: 2011,
- Trofeo Santiago Bernabéu Runners-up: 2013,

=== Manager ===
Zakho SC

- Iraq FA Cup Runners-up: 2024–25

Individual

- Iraq Stars League Manager of the Month: February 2025, March 2025,
