= Khalfan Ibrahim =

Qatari footballer (born 1988)

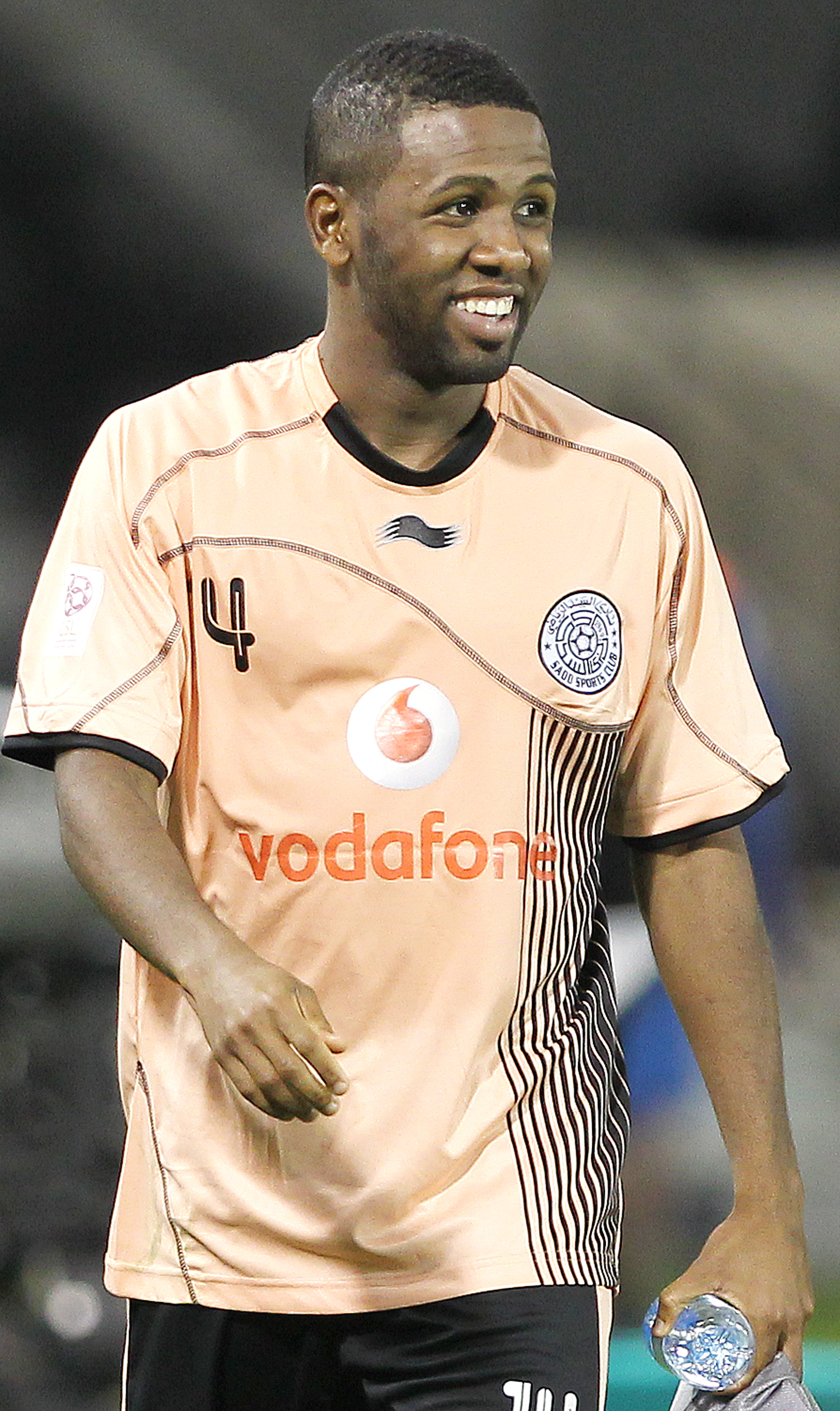
- Khalfan with Al Sadd in 2012

Personal information
- Full name: Khalfan Ibrahim Khalfan Al Khalfan
- Date of birth: 18 February 1988 (age 38)
- Place of birth: Doha, Qatar
- Height: 1.71 m (5 ft 7 in)
- Position: Winger

Youth career
- 1998–2004: Al Arabi

Senior career*
Years	Team	Apps	(Gls)
2004–2017	Al Sadd	298	(78)
2017–2018	Al-Arabi	19	(5)
2018–2019	Al Rayyan	12	(0)
2019–2020	Al-Arabi	1	(0)
Total		330	(83)

International career^{‡}
2003–2005	Qatar U–17	8	(9)
2005	Qatar U–20	2	(2)
2006	Qatar U–23	7	(3)
2006–2015	Qatar	90	(21)
- * Club domestic league appearances and goals as of 14:47, 8 January 2017 (UTC) ‡ National team caps and goals as of 28 February 2017

Khalfan Ibrahim Khalfan Al Khalfan (Arabic: خَلْفَان إِبْرَاهِيم خَلْفَان آل خَلْفَان; born 18 February 1988) is a retired Qatari international footballer who played as a winger. He was named the Asian Player of the Year in 2006, becoming the first Qatari to win the title. He played for Al Arabi at youth level before moving to Al Sadd in 2004 on a professional contract.

His father, Ibrahim Khalfan, is a former footballer who played for Al Arabi and the Qatar national team. He has been dubbed as the "Maradona of Qatar" and nicknamed "Khalfaninho" by his supporters in reference to Ronaldinho.

== Club career ==
=== Al Sadd ===
==== Early career ====
Khalfan started out with Al-Arabi (his father's club) and was signed by Al-Sadd in 2004. He assimilated into Al Sadd's first team at the age of 17 in March 2005, under head coach Doru Isac scoring against Al-Shamal.

==== 2005–06 ====
2005–06 was a significantly improved season for him when he scored goals in the Qatar League, Crown Prince Cup and Asian Champions League.

==== 2006–07 ====
His performance in 2006–07 played a part in achieving the Asian Player of The Year title. He scored 5 goals in Al Sadd's start to the league campaign and then was a crucial member of the Asian Games gold medal-winning Qatar team. However, in an Olympic qualifying match against Bahrain in February 2007, he got himself injured and was laid-off for more than one year, missing most of Al Sadd's season.

==== 2007–08 ====
He wasn't able to play in the 2007–08 league season due to injury as Al-Gharafa overtook Al-Sadd for the title.

==== 2008–09 ====
He returned from injury in the revamped 2008–09 season. He scored 8 goals in Al-Sadd's first 6 games.

==== 2010–11 ====
Khalfan won the 2011 AFC Champions League with Al Sadd. Khalfan delivered an inspired performance against Suwon in the semi-final second leg to keep the club's hopes alive. He featured in the final against Jeonbuk which was won 4–2 on penalties. He assisted Keita by providing an accurate cross which Keita volleyed into the net, as well as forcing a Jeonbuk defender to head the ball into his own net on the earlier goal. The Koreans scored a late equalizer to make it 2–2, causing the game to go to extra-time and eventually penalties. His performance in the AFC Champions League earned him offers from other clubs, including a contract from Saudi club Al Nassr, however it was announced by the Al Sadd management that they would only take offers from the club in the summer transfer window, as they needed Khalfan to play in the 2011 FIFA Club World Cup.

Al Sadd's Asian triumph took them to Japan for the Club World Cup where Khalfan featured and scored against the African champions Esperance in their first match. Abdul Kader Keita's shot from a tight angle was only parried to the far post by Moez Ben Cherifia. Khalfan then reacted the fastest to nod home on the goal-line. The match, which proved to be an ill-tempered affair, was won 2–1. It was capped off with Esperance fans throwing projectiles onto the field and attempting to get past the security barricade.

During this time, Khalfan accumulated 2 red cards in a row within 2 games in the Qatar Stars League, both in the 89th minute for physical altercations with other players. Al Sadd lost both of the matches in which he was red carded. However, he did not receive any red cards in international competitions.

==== 2011–12 ====
Khalfan finished the 2011–12 Qatar Stars League season as the top league scorer for Al Sadd, with 7 goals.

He scored a goal in the 2012 Qatar Crown Prince Cup in a 4–2 win over Lekhwiya before getting involved in an altercation with Lekhwiya midfielder Nam Tae-Hee after the match for unsportsmanlike behavior. He went on to score Al Sadd's only goal against Al Rayyan in the final, being named Man of the Match.

==== 2012–13 ====
Khalfan Ibrahim had a solid start to the season, playing a critical role of an attacking trio (with Mamadou Niang and Raúl González). They led Al Sadd from a win to another in their first league games, trying to get the club back as Al Sadd had only won 2 domestic competitions and the ACL in the last 5 years after the 2006–07 season in which they won all domestic competitions.

After the first 4 games of QSL, Khalfan (with Niang and Raúl) shared the second place on the top scorer table with 3 goals each. Khalfan scored his first hat-trick this season on Al Sailiya game on 22 October, where his team won 4–1 and he was assisted twice by Niang and once by Raúl, recording the second hat-trick scored in the league this season.

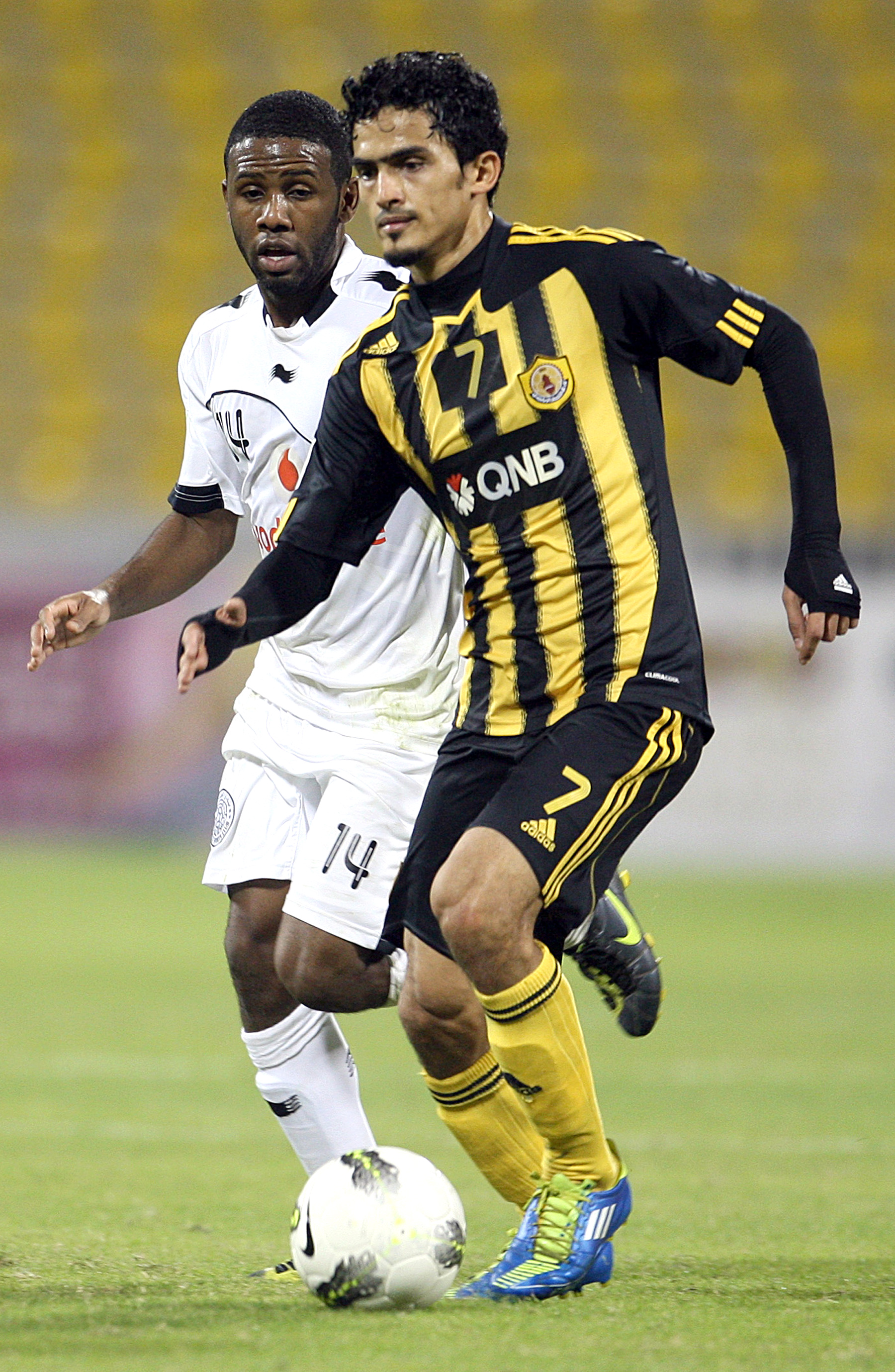
Khalfan in 2011 in a QSL match

On 26 April 2013, in a Crown Prince Cup match against Al Rayyan, he scored an impressive solo goal as he dribbled 60 meters past the entire opposition defense to score a long-range goal. Some news agencies considered it a 'carbon copy' of Diego Maradona's goal against England in the 1986 World Cup, and also reminiscent of Lionel Messi's 'Maradona goal' in 2007. It was touted as a contender for the best goal of 2013 and has been described as arguably the best goal by all Qatari players in history. His teammate, Raúl, stated he was the best player of the season, comparing him to Diego Maradona.

On 19 May, he was named as the QFA Player of the Year, beating off competition from teammate Raúl Gonzalez.

==== 2013–14 ====
Khalfan scored his first goal of the 2013–14 season against Al-Ahli on 20 September.

Süper Lig club Beşiktaş were rumored to be interested in signing Khalfan in the off season to replace Hugo Almeida.

==== 2014–15 ====
On 22 September 2014, he scored his 63rd goal for Al Sadd against Al Shahania in a 3–2 win, surpassing Carlos Tenorio's 5-year-old record of 62 goals to become Al Sadd's all-time scorer.

== International career ==
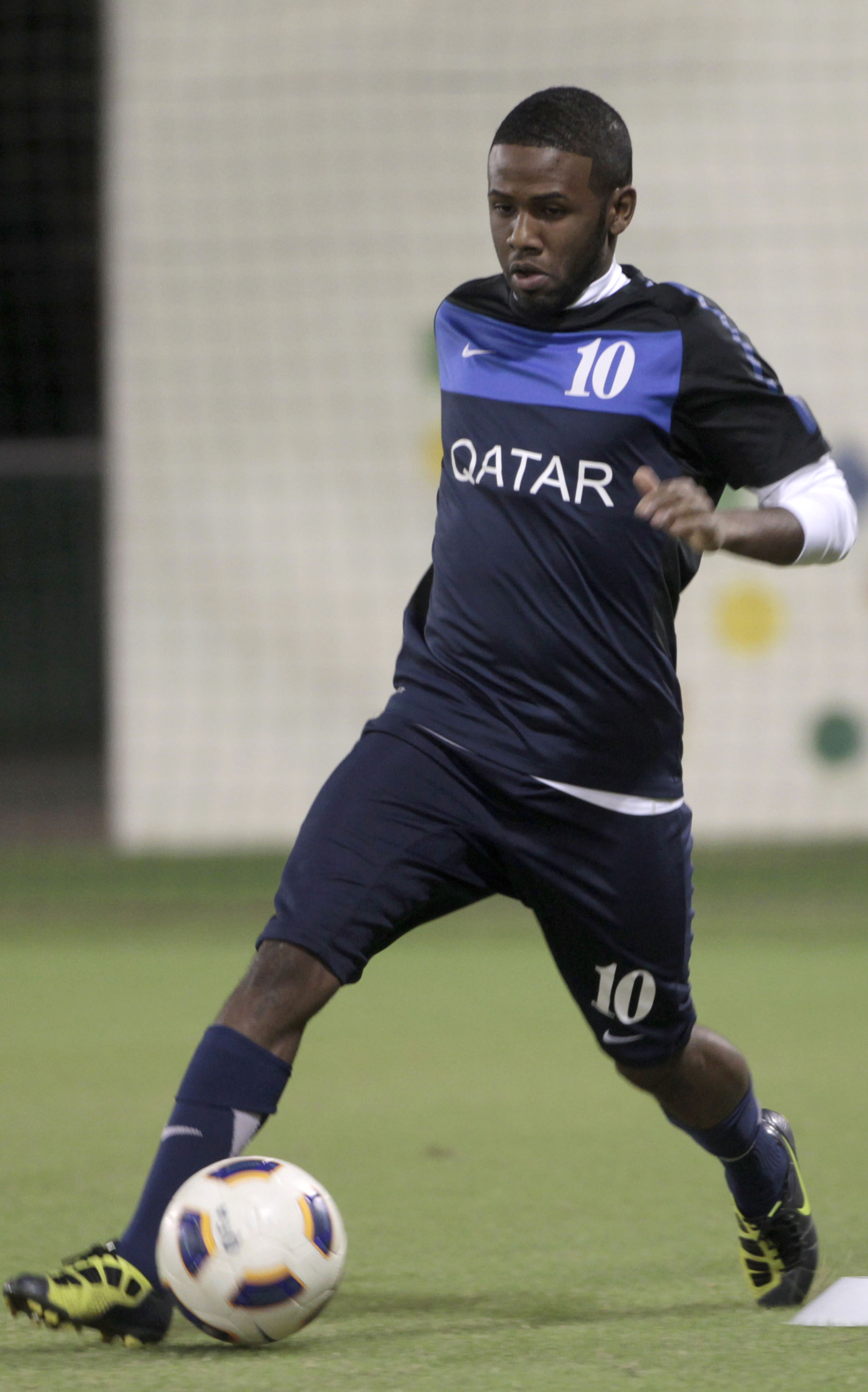
Khalfan during a national team training session in Doha

=== Youth teams ===
Khalfan first played for Qatar's youth teams, scoring 6 goals in the under-17 Gulf Cup held in 2003, helping Qatar finish runners-up in the process. Qatar finished runner-up and Khalfan finished second in the scorers list with 6 goals. He was part of the Qatar squad which played at the FIFA Under-17 World Cup in Peru, scoring one goal in the match against the mighty Netherlands. He and his young teammates battled their more illustrious opponents to a 2–2 stalemate at halftime but eventually lost out 3–5. It was a performance which caught the eye and contributed greatly to his Asian Player of the Year title. In the same year he played in the West Asian Games. Qatar's campaign was unsuccessful despite Khalfan scoring two goals. In all the above tournaments he played with a number of his teammates who along with him were to become the backbone of Al-Sadd and the senior national team.

=== Senior team ===
After his stellar performances at the youth level, he and his teammates broke into the Annabi's senior team. Their first major triumph was the Asian Games title won in front of home fans, with Khalfan scoring 2 goals. He scored two superb goals against Bangladesh in their Asian Cup 2007 qualifying match. He then took part in his first Arabian Gulf Cup, where Qatar couldn't defend their title despite Khalfan scoring one goal against Bahrain. In 2008, he played a prominent part in Qatar's World Cup qualifying campaign scoring against Asia's No 1 side-Australia.

Khalfan took part in Qatar's 2014 World Cup Qualifications which were held from 2011. In a match versus Indonesia, which would be Indonesia's last hopes of qualifying for the World Cup, Khalfan scored an amazing goal from a long way out after dribbling past the defenders. Qatar proved to be too much for Indonesia, eventually winning the game 3–2 in a tightly clinched match. Khalfan also got a brace in the home match against Indonesia in a 4–0 win, thus officially eliminating them from qualifying, and in the process, making him the top scorer for Qatar in the 2014 WCQ.

Brazilian legend Zico commented on Khalfan's performance against Indonesia, stating "I saw that (2014 FIFA World Cup qualifying match) between Indonesia and Qatar on television, and I saw this wonderful player. He has speed and great dribbling skills. He has the features of a Brazilian player. I am confident that Qatar can produce talented players like Khalfan Ibrahim".

== Career statistics ==
=== Club ===
As of 28 August 2022

Club	Season	League	League		Cup^{1}		League Cup^{2}		Asia^{3}		Other^{4}		Total	
Club	Season	League	Apps	Goals	Apps	Goals	Apps	Goals	Apps	Goals	Apps	Goals	Apps	Goals
Al-Sadd	2004–05	QSL	10	1	0	0	-	-	3	1	0	0	13	2
Al-Sadd	2005–06	QSL	12	1	4	1	-	-	3	0	0	0	19	2
Al-Sadd	2006–07	QSL	16	5	5	0	-	-	4	1	2	0	27	6
Al-Sadd	2007–08	QSL	6	2	3	0	-	-	-	-	0	0	9	2
Al-Sadd	2008–09	QSL	21	15	1	0	-	-	-	-	3	0	25	15
Al-Sadd	2009–10	QSL	9	2	3	0	0	0	6	1	2	0	20	3
Al-Sadd	2010–11	QSL	18	3	2	1	2	0	11	2	7	1	40	6
Al-Sadd	2011–12	QSL	17	7	4	3	2	2	-	-	3	0	26	12
Al-Sadd	2012–13	QSL	21	10	5	2	0	0	-	-	5	1	31	13
Al-Sadd	2013–14	QSL	26	14	3	1	0	0	10	3	0	0	33	18
Al-Sadd	2014–15	QSL	20	11	2	0	0	0	9	6	0	0	22	11
Al-Sadd	2015–16	QSL	19	3	2	0	0	0	1	0	0	0	21	3
Al-Sadd	2016–17	QSL	13	4	0	0	0	0	1	0	0	0	13	4
Total			208	78	34	8	4	2	48	14	22	2	316	104
Al-Sadd B	2015–16	Reserve League (Qatar)	1	1	0	0	0	0	0	0	0	0	1	1
Al-Rayyan SC	2018–19	QSL	12	0	0	0	0	0	2	0	1	0	15	0
Total			12	0	0	0	0	0	2	0	1	0	15	0
Al-Arabi SC (Qatar)	2017–18	QSL	19	5	2	0	0	0	0	0	0	0	21	5
Al-Arabi SC (Qatar)	2019–20	QSL	1	0	0	0	0	0	0	0	0	0	1	0
Al-Arabi SC (Qatar)	Al-Arabi SC (Qatar) Total		20	5	2	0	0	0	0	0	0	0	22	5
Career total			241	84	36	8	4	2	50	14	23	2	354	108

^{1}Includes Emir of Qatar Cup and Qatar Crown Prince Cup.

^{2}Includes Qatari Stars Cup.

^{3}Includes AFC Champions League.

^{4}Includes FIFA Club World Cup and Sheikh Jassem Cup.

=== International goals ===
Scores and results list Qatar's goal tally first.

#	Date	Venue	Opponent	Score	Result	Competition
1	16 August 2006	MA Aziz Stadium, Chittagong	Bangladesh	3–1	4–1	2007 AFC Asian Cup qualifier
2	16 August 2006	MA Aziz Stadium, Chittagong	Bangladesh	4–1	4–1	2007 AFC Asian Cup qualifier
3	24 January 2007	Al Nahyan Stadium, Abu Dhabi	Bahrain	1–0	1–2	18th Arabian Gulf Cup
4	14 June 2008	Jassim Bin Hamad Stadium, Doha	Australia	1–3	1–3	2010 FIFA World Cup qualifier
5	11 October 2011	Gelora Bung Karno Stadium, Jakarta	Indonesia	2–1	3–2	2014 FIFA World Cup qualifier
6	11 November 2011	Jassim Bin Hamad Stadium, Doha	Indonesia	2–0	4–0	2014 FIFA World Cup qualifier
7	11 November 2011	Jassim Bin Hamad Stadium, Doha	Indonesia	3–0	4–0	2014 FIFA World Cup qualifier
8	29 February 2012	Azadi Stadium, Tehran	Iran	1–1	2–2	2014 FIFA World Cup qualifier
9	9 October 2012	Thani bin Jassim Stadium, Doha	Oman	1–1	1–1	Friendly
10	7 November 2012	Jassim Bin Hamad Stadium, Doha	Iraq	1–0	2–1	Friendly
11	5 January 2013	Madinat 'Isa Stadium, Isa Town	United Arab Emirates	1–0	1–3	21st Arabian Gulf Cup
12	8 January 2013	Madinat 'Isa Stadium, Isa Town	Oman	1–0	2–1	21st Arabian Gulf Cup
13	6 February 2013	Jassim Bin Hamad Stadium, Doha	Malaysia	1–0	2–0	2015 AFC Asian Cup qualifier
14	17 March 2013	Jassim Bin Hamad Stadium, Doha	Thailand	1–0	1–0	Friendly
15	26 March 2013	Seoul World Cup Stadium, Seoul	South Korea	1–1	1–2	2014 FIFA World Cup qualifier
16	29 May 2013	Jassim Bin Hamad Stadium. Doha	Azerbaijan	1–0	1–1	Friendly
17	13 October 2013	Thani bin Jassim Stadium, Doha	Yemen	1–0	6–0	2015 AFC Asian Cup qualifier
18	13 October 2013	Thani bin Jassim Stadium, Doha	Yemen	3–0	6–0	2015 AFC Asian Cup qualifier
19	13 October 2013	Thani bin Jassim Stadium, Doha	Yemen	5–0	6–0	2015 AFC Asian Cup qualifier
20	14 October 2014	Abdullah bin Khalifa Stadium, Doha	Australia	1–0	1–0	Friendly
21	11 January 2015	Canberra Stadium, Canberra	United Arab Emirates	1–0	1–4	2015 AFC Asian Cup

=== Notable matches ===
- Qatar vs. Bangladesh (Asian Cup 2007 Qualifiers) – First International match, scored twice.
- Al-Sadd vs Al-Rayyan – Scored two breath taking goals in a league match in 2007.
- Qatar vs. Indonesia (World Cup 2014 Qualifiers) – 3–2 win, scored once and assisted twice.

== Honours ==
Al Sadd

- Qatar Stars League: 2003–04, 2005–06, 2006–07, 2012–13
- Emir of Qatar Cup: 2005, 2007, 2014
- Qatar Crown Prince Cup: 2006, 2007, 2008
- Sheikh Jassem Cup: 2007, 2014
- Qatari Stars Cup: 2010
- AFC Champions League: 2011
- FIFA Club World Cup Bronze Medalist: 2011

Individual

- Asian Player of the Year: 2006
- Qatar Stars League Young Player of the Year: 2006
- Best Arab Player: 2007
- Qatar Player of the Year: 2013
