= Taher Zakaria =

Qatari footballer (born 1988)

Personal information
- Full name: Taher Zakaria
- Date of birth: 22 August 1988 (age 38)
- Place of birth: Qatar
- Height: 1.83 m (6 ft 0 in)
- Position: Defender

Senior career*
Years	Team	Apps	(Gls)
2006–2016	Al Sadd	12	(0)
2006–2007	→ Al Shamal (loan)	46	(2)
2014	→ Al Rayyan SC (Loan)		
2014–2015	→ Al Ahli (Loan)		
2015–2017	Al Rayyan SC		
2016–2017	→ Al-Shahania (loan)		

International career^{‡}
2009–2012	Qatar	2	(0)
- * Club domestic league appearances and goals ‡ National team caps and goals as of 27 July 2012

Taher Zakaria (born 1988) is a Qatari footballer who is a defender. He is a member of the Qatar national football team.
