= Nasser Nabeel =

Qatari footballer (born 1990)

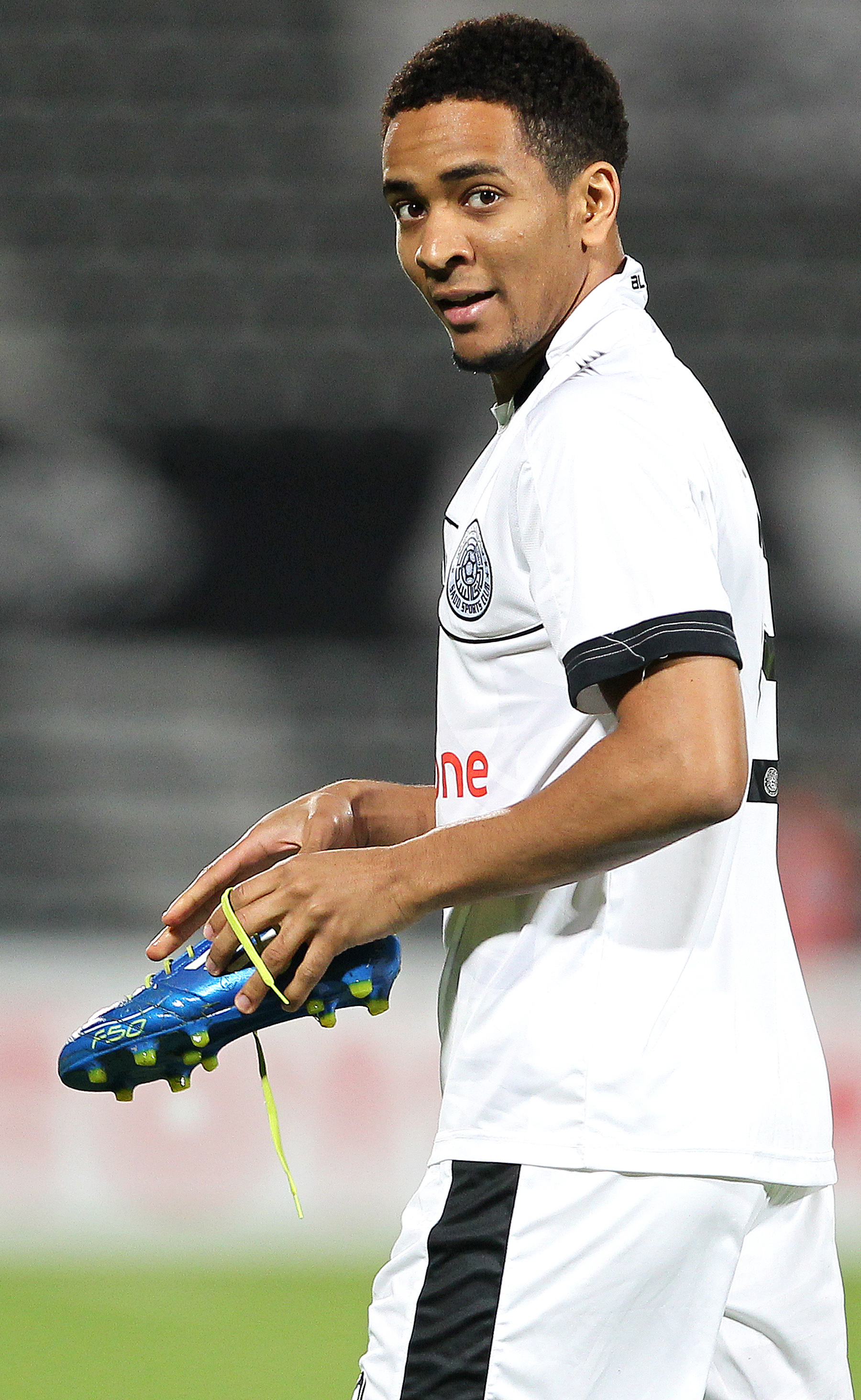
- Nasser Nabeel with Al Sadd in 2012

Personal information
- Full name: Nasser Nabeel Salem
- Date of birth: February 11, 1990 (age 36)
- Place of birth: Qatar
- Height: 1.74 m (5 ft 9 in)
- Position: Defender

Youth career
- Al Sadd

Senior career*
Years	Team	Apps	(Gls)
2006–2016	Al Sadd	35	(2)
2014–2015	→ Al Arabi (loan)		
2015–2016	→ Mesaimeer (loan)		

International career
2009	Qatar	3	(1)
- * Club domestic league appearances and goals

Nasser Nabeel Saleem (born February 11, 1990) is a Qatari footballer who is a defender . He is a first-generation graduate of the ASPIRE Academy.

== Goals for senior national team ==
#	Date	Venue	Opponent	Score	Result	Competition
	17/03/2009	Doha, Qatar	Kuwait	1-0	Won	Friendly
