= Mesaad Al-Hamad =

Qatari footballer (born 1986)

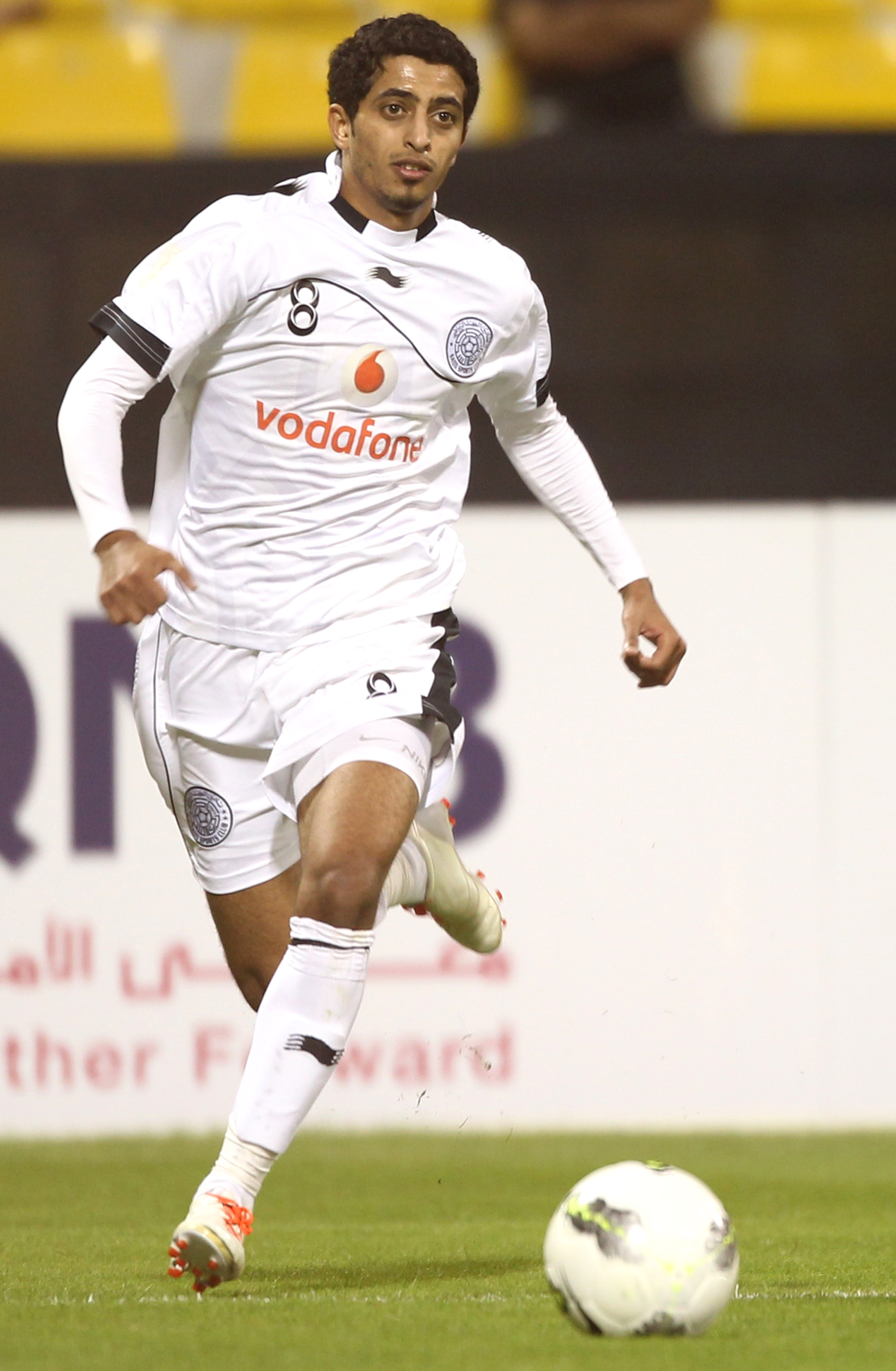
- Al-Hmmad with Al Sadd in 2011

Personal information
- Full name: Mesaad Ali Al-Hamad
- Date of birth: 11 February 1986 (age 40)
- Place of birth: Doha, Qatar
- Height: 1.77 m (5 ft 10 in)
- Positions: Defender; right back

Senior career*
Years	Team	Apps	(Gls)
2004–2014	Al Sadd	152	(4)
2014–2015	Al-Ahli	6	(0)
2015–2016	Umm Salal SC	3	(0)
2016	Al-Wakrah	0	(0)
2016–2020	Al-Shahania	50	(1)
2020	Muaither		

International career^{‡}
2006–2012	Qatar	34	(0)
- * Club domestic league appearances and goals as of 27/6/2015 ‡ National team caps and goals as of 27/4/2015

Mesaad Ali Al-Hamad (born 11 February 1986) is a Qatari footballer who plays as a right defender . He is a member of the Qatar national football team.

== Club career statistics ==
Statistics accurate as of 21 August 2011

Club	Season	League	League		Cup^{1}		League Cup^{2}		Continental^{3}		Total	
Club	Season	League	Apps	Goals	Apps	Goals	Apps	Goals	Apps	Goals	Apps	Goals
Al-Sadd	2003–04	QSL	3	0								
Al-Sadd	2004–05	QSL	14	0								
Al-Sadd	2005–06	QSL	9	0								
Al-Sadd	2006–07	QSL	22	0								
Al-Sadd	2007–08	QSL	18	0								
Al-Sadd	2008–09	QSL	23	2								
Al-Sadd	2009–10	QSL	11	1								
Al-Sadd	2010–11	QSL	16	0								
Al-Sadd	2011-12	QSL										
Al-Sadd	Total		116	3								
Career total			116	3								

^{1}Includes Emir of Qatar Cup.

^{2}Includes Sheikh Jassem Cup.

^{3}Includes AFC Champions League.
