= Nadir Belhadj =

Algerian-French footballer (born 1982)

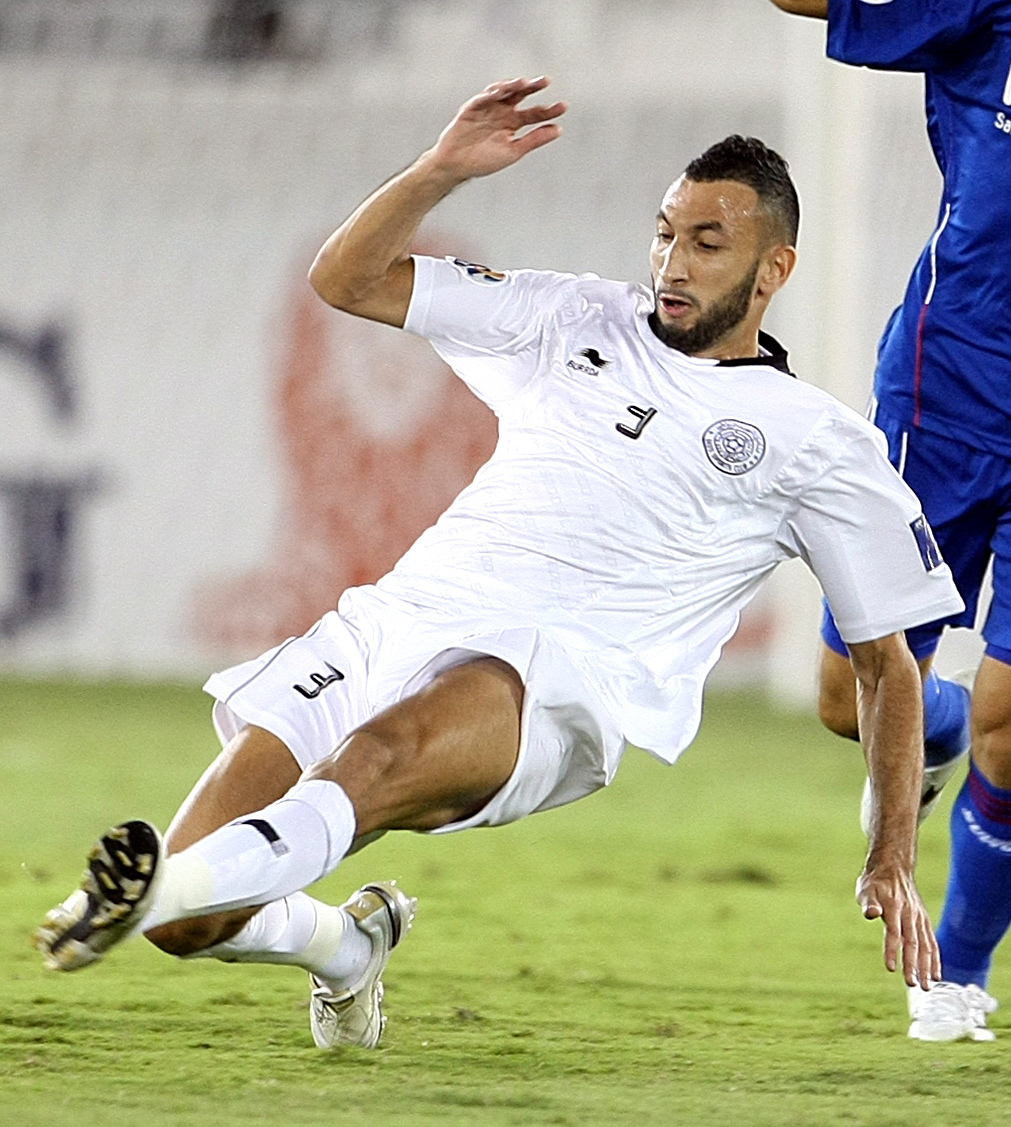
- Belhadj playing for Al Sadd in 2011

Personal information
- Full name: Nadir Belhadj
- Date of birth: 18 June 1982 (age 44)
- Place of birth: Saint-Claude, Jura, France
- Height: 1.75 m (5 ft 9 in)
- Position: Left-back

Youth career
- –1997: Jura Sud Foot
- 1997–1998: Besançon RC
- 1998–2002: Lens

Senior career*
Years	Team	Apps	(Gls)
1998–2002	Lens	0	(0)
2002–2003	→ Gueugnon (loan)	28	(1)
2003–2004	Gueugnon	36	(1)
2004–2006	Sedan	65	(3)
2006–2008	Lyon	9	(0)
2006–2007	→ Sedan (loan)	37	(2)
2008–2009	Lens	19	(0)
2008–2009	→ Portsmouth (loan)	16	(2)
2009–2010	Portsmouth	32	(3)
2010–2016	Al-Sadd	137	(19)
2016–2017	Sedan	19	(2)
2017–2021	Al-Sailiya	85	(4)
2021	Sedan	12	(0)
2022	Muaither	8	(0)
Total		503	(37)

International career
2000	France U18	2	(0)
2004–2012	Algeria	55	(4)
- * Club domestic league appearances and goals

Nadir Belhadj (Arabic: نذير بلحاج; born 18 June 1982) is an Algerian former professional footballer who played as a left-back.

An Algerian international, Belhadj was a former French youth international having played for the French Under-18's for a couple of games in 2000. Belhadj was among the first footballers to profit from the 2004 change in FIFA eligibility rules as he had played as a French youth international. After his switch of national allegiance to Algeria, he was called up to an unofficial friendly on 30 March 2004 against Belgian club R.A.A. Louviéroise. He made his senior international debut in a friendly against China on 28 April 2004. He featured for Algeria at the 2010 Africa Cup of Nations, reaching the semi-finals, and the 2010 FIFA World Cup. On 4 May 2012, he announced his international retirement, ending his career with 54 caps and 4 goals.

Belhadj played a vital role for Qatari club Al Sadd in the 2011 Asian Champions League final, by beating South Korean side Jeonbuk Hyundai Motors 4–2 in a penalty shoot-out. Belhadj scored the decisive penalty after the game had finished 2–2 in regulation time, holding his nerve to beat Kim Min-Sik. This was the first win for a Qatari club since the AFC Champions League started in 2003, and ended five consecutive triumphs for South Korea and Japan.

== Personal life ==
Belhadj was born in Saint-Claude, Jura, to Algerian parents, both from Oran. He started playing with Jura Sud Foot until 1997. He played after with Racing Besançon.

== Club career ==
=== France ===
A left-back who can also operate as a winger, Belhadj began his career at Ligue 1 club Lens, where he failed to make the first-team. He joined Ligue 2 FC Gueugnon on loan in 2002 and after making 26 league appearances signed permanently in 2003. Belhadj played 36 more Ligue 2 games for Gueugnon before moving to CS Sedan in 2004. Making more than thirty appearances in each of his two full seasons with Sedan in Ligue 2, gaining promotion in the second.

In January 2007, Belhadj signed for French champions Olympique Lyonnais for €3.24 million on a four-and-a-half-year contract. He was loaned back to CS Sedan until the end of the season and joined Lyon again in the summer of 2007. He made just nine appearances for the club, being blocked at the left-back position by World Cup champion Fabio Grosso, and left the club in January. On 7 January 2008, Belhadj signed a three-and-a-half-year contract with his former club Lens for a fee of €3.6 million. Six months after he left Lyon they won the 2007–08 Ligue 1 title, to which Belhadj had contributed 9 appearances.

=== Portsmouth ===
On 1 September 2008, Belhadj joined Portsmouth on a season-long loan with an option sign permanently. He made his Portsmouth debut on 13 September coming on as a substitute against Middlesbrough at Fratton Park where Portsmouth went from a goal down to come back and win 2–1, with Belhadj playing a key role on the left with Armand Traoré. He also started in Portsmouth's first ever European match, a 2–0 win over Vitória de Guimarães and set Jermain Defoe up with a cross. He also scored a long range goal against Sunderland away from home in a 2–1 win, which was the first win for new manager Tony Adams.

Belhadj played a part in Portsmouth's 2–2 draw against A.C. Milan in the UEFA Cup. On 30 December, Belhadj signed a four-and-a-half-year deal with Portsmouth, costing €4.5 million paid to Lens, keeping him at the club until 2013. He officially became a Portsmouth player on 1 January 2009 when the winter transfer window opened. On 27 January 2009, Belhadj was sent off for the first time for Portsmouth when he picked up two yellow cards in the 1–0 defeat against Aston Villa.

Although he has not always kept a first team place, his recall to face Liverpool on 20 December 2009 was an inspired move by Avram Grant as Belhadj was able to keep former Pompey favourite Glen Johnson under control. Belhadj scored the first goal in the game. A highlight of the 2009–10 season for Belhadj was a goal against local rivals Southampton in the FA Cup on 13 February 2010. Belhadj's last appearance for Portsmouth was as a substitute in the 2010 FA Cup final.

=== Al Sadd ===
During the 2011 summer transfer market several clubs showed interest, such as Celtic, Wigan and Wolves with Al Sadd rejecting all proposals as they viewed Belhadj as an important member of the team. He helped guide his team to the 2011 AFC Champions League title, defeating Jeonbuk Hyundai Motors in the final where he scored the game winning penalty in the shootout.

In January 2013, Belhadj was invited by Lekhwiya to play in a friendly against Paris Saint-Germain.

=== Return to France ===
For the 2021–22 season, he returned to Sedan, before leaving the club to reunite with his family in Qatar in late November 2021.

=== Muaither ===
On 19 January 2022, Muaither has signed Belhadj.

== International career ==
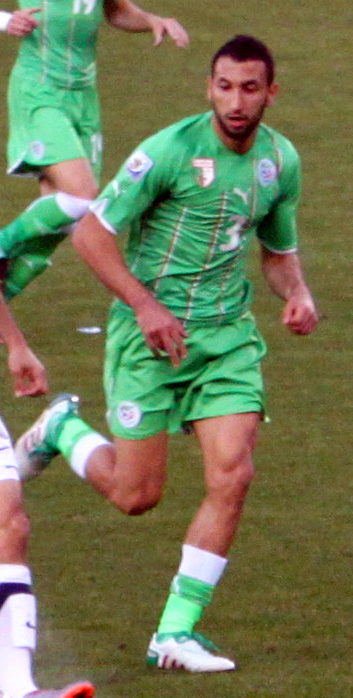
Belhadj playing at the 2010 FIFA World Cup

Belhadj began his international career in 2000 by representing France at the Under-18 level, making just two appearances for the team.

On 30 March 2004, Belhadj made his unofficial debut for the Algerian national team in a 0–0 friendly against Belgian club R.A.A. Louviéroise. On 28 April 2004, he made his official debut for the team in a friendly against China. On 5 June 2007, Belhadj got his first international goal in a friendly 4–3 loss to Argentina. He scored two goals in that game beating goalkeeper Roberto Abbondanzieri twice from free kicks.

At the 2010 Africa Cup of Nations, he was sent off in the semi-final against Egypt with a straight card and received a two match competitive international suspension, ruling him out of the 2012 Africa Cup of Nations qualification match against Tanzania.

Since the 2010 World Cup and signing with Al-Sadd in the Qatar Stars League, Belhadj has seen his place at left-back for the national side slip away to Djamel Mesbah, ever since his calamitous appearance against the Central African Republic.

On 4 May 2012, Belhadj announced his international retirement.

== Career statistics ==
Scores and results list Algeria's goal tally first. "Score" column indicates the score after the player's goal.

No.	Date	Venue	Opponent	Score	Result	Competition
1	5 June 2007	Camp Nou, Barcelona, Spain	Argentina	2–1	3–4	Friendly match
2	5 June 2007	Camp Nou, Barcelona, Spain	Argentina	3–4	3–4	Friendly match
3	20 November 2007	Stade Robert Diochon, Rouen, France	Mali	3–2	3–2	Friendly match
4	11 October 2009	Stade Mustapha Tchaker, Blida, Algeria	Rwanda	2–1	3–1	2010 FIFA World Cup qualification

== Honours ==
Sedan

- Coupe de France runner-up: 2004–05

Lens

- Coupe de la Ligue runner-up: 2007–08

Portsmouth

- FA Cup runner-up: 2009–10

Al-Sadd

- Qatar Stars League: 2012–13
- Emir of Qatar Cup: 2014, 2015
- Qatari Sheikh Jassim Cup: 2014
- Qatari Stars Cup: 2010
- AFC Champions League: 2011

Al-Sailiya

- Qatari Stars Cup: 2020–21

Individual

- Ligue 2 Team of the Year: 2004–05, 2005–06
- CAF Team of the Year: 2009
- Qatar Stars League Player of the Year: 2013–14
