= Abdul Kader Keïta =

Ivorian footballer (born 1981)

Kader Keïta
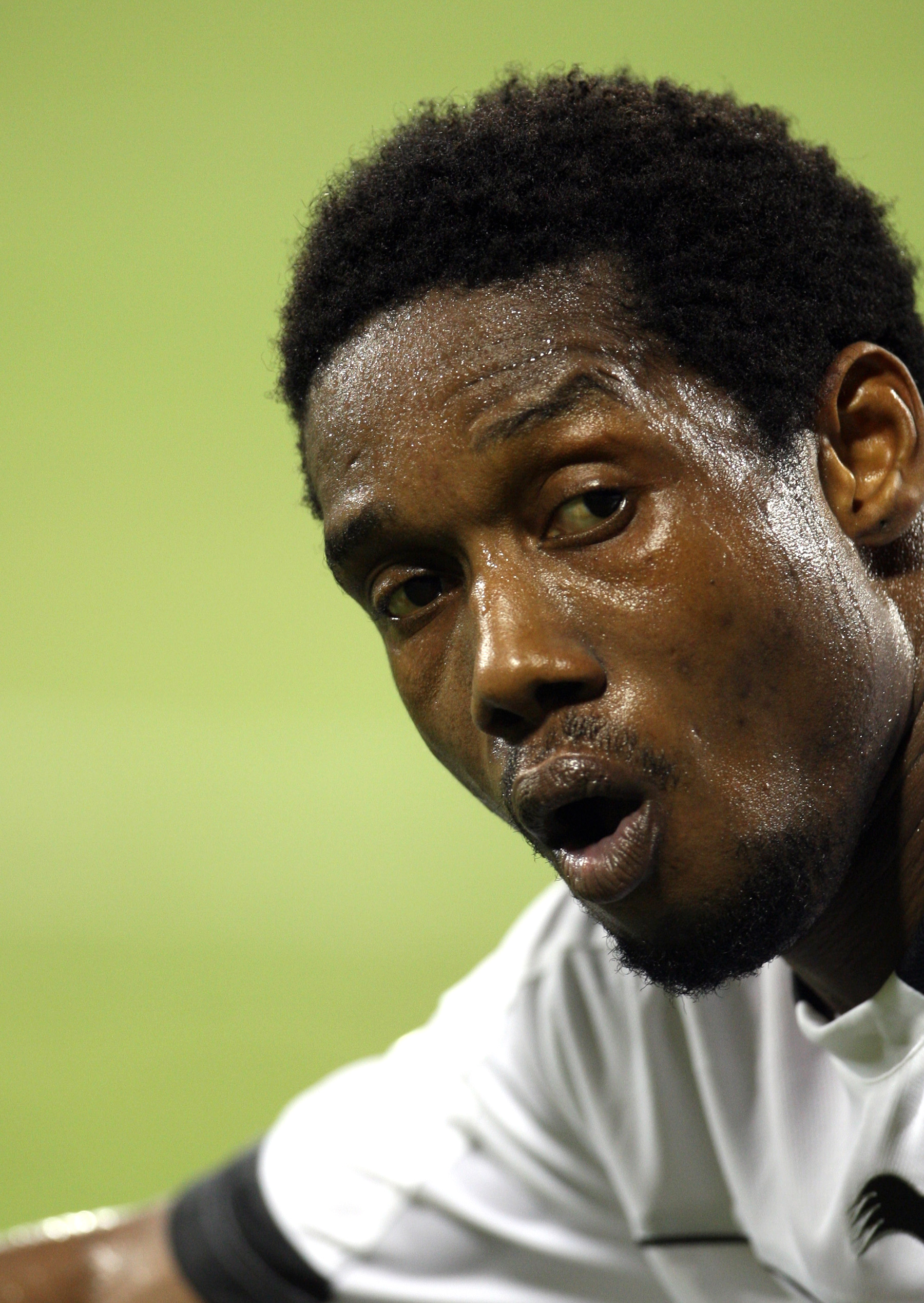
- Keïta in 2011

Personal information
- Full name: Abdul Kader Keïta
- Date of birth: 6 August 1981 (age 45)
- Place of birth: Gagnoa, Ivory Coast
- Height: 1.84 m (6 ft 0 in)
- Position: Winger

Youth career
- 1998–1999: Africa Sports

Senior career*
Years	Team	Apps	(Gls)
1999–2000	Africa Sports	23	(4)
2000–2001	Étoile du Sahel	22	(7)
2002	Al Ain	19	(6)
2002–2005	Al-Sadd	53	(26)
2005–2007	Lille	73	(17)
2007–2009	Lyon	62	(5)
2009–2010	Galatasaray	27	(5)
2010–2012	Al-Sadd	27	(7)
2014–2015	Budapest Honvéd	2	(0)
Total		281	(77)

International career
2000–2012	Ivory Coast	74	(11)
- * Club domestic league appearances and goals

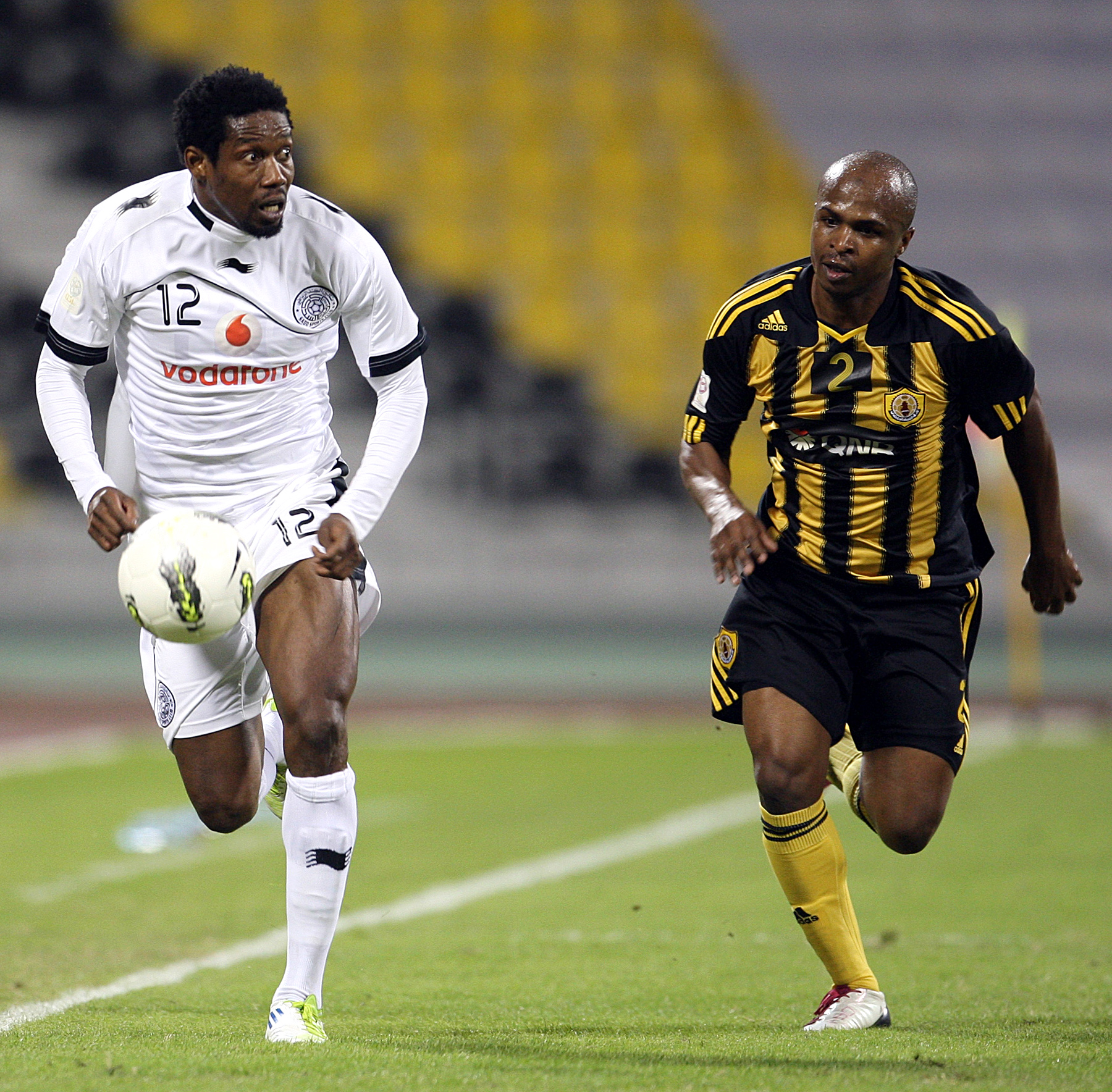
Keïta (left) during a Qatari league match

Abdul Kader Keïta (born 6 August 1981) is an Ivorian former professional footballer who played as a winger. He represented the Ivory Coast national team from 2000 to 2012.

== Club career ==
Keïta, also known as 'Popito', began his career at homeland club Africa Sports, before moving on to Tunisian Club Etoile du Sahel. Following spells in United Arab Emirates with Al Ain and Qatar with Al Sadd, he moved to France with Ligue 1 club Lille in 2005.

=== Lyon ===
On 31 May 2007, Lyon chairman Jean-Michel Aulas revealed that the club had made bids for both Keïta and his teammate Mathieu Bodmer.

On 16 June 2007, Lyon confirmed the signing of Keïta from Lille for €18 million, with Bodmer also moving to Lyon. During his two seasons at the club, he made 52 appearances in all competitions, scoring 5 goals.

=== Galatasaray ===
On 2 July 2009, Galatasaray officially announced that Keïta joined the Turkish club and signed a three-year contract, for €8.5 million transfer fee plus €500,000 variable. He scored his first goal for Galatasaray in a UEFA Europa League qualification match against Maccabi Netanya in the 5th minute. On 12 December, Keïta scored for Galatasaray in a 3–2 victory over Antalyaspor.

On 18 February 2010, Keïta scored a late equalizer to secure a 1–1 away draw for Galatasaray against Atlético Madrid in the UEFA Europa League. Later, in the second leg he equalized again to make it 1–1, but Galatasaray failed to qualify. On 28 February, he scored the second and fourth goals in a 4–1 victory over Kasımpaşa. His first goal was a volley from just inside the penalty area. In Galatasaray's 3–0 victory over MKE Ankaragücü in March, Keïta scored the second goal as well as assisting the final goal. On 11 April 2010, he assisted two of Milan Baroš' goals in a 4–1 victory over Diyarbakırspor. A week later, he scored the first goal in a 1–2 victory over Manisaspor.

=== Al Sadd ===
Keïta rejoined his previous club Al Sadd in July 2010, for €8.15 million.

Keïta was involved in a melee which ensued on 19 October in the 2011 AFC Champions League semi final first-leg between Suwon Samsung Bluewings and Al Sadd. Suwon player Choi Sung-Hwan was inadvertently kicked in the head by an Al Sadd defender, and Suwon's Yeom Ki-hoon let the ball out after Choi Sung-hwan went down with a head injury inside Al Sadd's box. While Choi was being tended to by medics, Keïta took the free kick quickly, and passed it to teammate Mamadou Niang unknowingly to the Suwon defense who thought possession would be returned to them according to FIFA fair play rules. Niang sprinted down the center half past the goalkeeper to score a second goal for Al Sadd. The chaos was further elevated when a Suwon fan ran onto the pitch, causing a brawl to erupt between the two teams. Afterwards, Keïta received a red card, allegedly for running towards the fan, slapping him in the back of the head and grabbing him by his throat. His teammate Lee Jung-Soo had told the press that Keïta had apologized for assisting Niang in scoring the goal, and admitted it was wrong. Al Sadd's coach, Jorge Fossati, suggested that Al Sadd was annoyed that Suwon had not immediately put the ball out of play, and decided to take actions into their own hands. Keïta was later suspended by AFC for the return leg.

Keïta scored a goal in the AFC Champions League Final on 5 November, as his side defeated Jeonbuk Motors on penalties after the match ended 2–2 and was named as Man of the Match. He left the team at the end of the 2011–12 season, and was linked with several teams in England and stated his interest of playing in the Premier League.

== International career ==
Keïta had a distinguished international career with 72 caps for the Ivory Coast, representing the team at the 2006 FIFA World Cup, 2010 FIFA World Cup and at four Africa Cup of Nations in 2002, 2008, 2010, and 2012, helping them finish runner-up in 2012.

Keïta was selected for 2010 African Nations Cup and played three matches, scoring once against Algeria during the quarter-final match.

=== 2010 World Cup incident ===
During the 2010 FIFA World Cup in South Africa, Keïta was involved in an off-the-ball incident with Kaká during a group game against Brazil. Keïta ran into Kaká and fell onto the floor, clutching his face, as if in great pain. Kaká was shown a yellow card, his second of the match, and sent off. ABC wrote "Abdul Kader Keïta's embarrassing reaction to a love-tap in the midriff from the Brazilian playmaker was both laughable and disgraceful. Obviously hoping to get Kaka in further hot water after he had only just earlier been shown his first yellow card, Keïta fell to the ground and clutched his face as if he'd been shot from close range. He blatantly cheated to ensure the Brazilian was given his marching orders."

The incident has been named by numerous journalists as among the most shameful in the World Cup and was called "disgraceful" by the sports announcer, and Keïta's actions named in the ten worst moments of the World Cup. Keïta was named to the 2010 World Cup "Infamous 11" as one of the all-around worst sportsmen in the tournament.

== Personal life ==
Keïta's older brother, Fadel, is also a former professional footballer and Ivorian international.

== Career statistics ==
=== International ===
Appearances and goals by national team and year
National team	Year	Apps	Goals
Ivory Coast	2000	3	0
Ivory Coast	2001	11	5
Ivory Coast	2002	4	0
Ivory Coast	2003	4	0
Ivory Coast	2004	–	
Ivory Coast	2005	–	
Ivory Coast	2006	9	1
Ivory Coast	2007	5	0
Ivory Coast	2008	8	3
Ivory Coast	2009	6	1
Ivory Coast	2010	12	1
Ivory Coast	2011	2	0
Ivory Coast	2012	10	0
Total		74	11

Scores and results list Ivory Coast's goal tally first, score column indicates score after each Keïta goal.

List of international goals scored by Titus Mulama
No.	Date	Venue	Opponent	Score	Result	Competition
1	20 January 2001	Stade Bouaké, Bouaké, Ivory Coast	Sudan	1–0	2–0	2002 Africa Cup of Nations
2	22 April 2001	Felix Houphouet Boigny Stadium, Abidjan, Ivory Coast	Congo	1–0	2–0	2002 FIFA World Cup qualification
3	3 June 2001	11 June Stadium, Tripoli, Libya	Libya	1–0	3–0	2002 Africa Cup of Nations qualification
4	1 July 2001	Felix Houphouet Boigny Stadium, Abidjan, Ivory Coast	Madagascar	3–0	6–0	2002 FIFA World Cup qualification
5	29 July 2001	Felix Houphouet Boigny Stadium, Abidjan, Ivory Coast	DR Congo	1–1	1–2	2002 FIFA World Cup qualification
6	1 March 2006	José Zorrilla Stadium, Valladolid, Spain	Spain	1–0	2–3	Friendly
7	25 January 2008	Sekondi-Takoradi Stadium, Sekondi-Takoradi, Ghana	Benin	3–0	4–1	2008 Africa Cup of Nations
8	3 February 2008	Sekondi-Takoradi Stadium, Sekondi-Takoradi, Ghana	Guinea	1–0	5–0	2008 Africa Cup of Nations
9	7 February 2008	Baba Yara Stadium, Kumasi, Ghana	Egypt	1–2	1–4	2008 Africa Cup of Nations
10	5 September 2009	Felix Houphouet Boigny Stadium, Abidjan, Ivory Coast	Burkina Faso	5–0	5–0	2010 FIFA World Cup qualification
11	24 January 2010	Estádio Nacional do Chiazi, Cabinda, Angola	Algeria	2–1	2–3 (a.e.t.)	2010 Africa Cup of Nations

== Honours ==
Africa Sports

- African Cup Winners' Cup: 1999

Al-Ain

- UAE Pro League: 2001–02
- GCC Champions League: 2001

Al-Sadd

- Qatar Stars League: 2003–04
- Emir of Qatar Cup: 2002–03, 2004–05
- Qatar Crown Prince Cup: 2003
- AFC Champions League: 2011

Lyon

- Ligue 1: 2007–08
- Coupe de France: 2007–08
- Trophée des Champions: 2007
