= 2009–10 Portsmouth F.C. season =

Portsmouth FC
2009–10 season
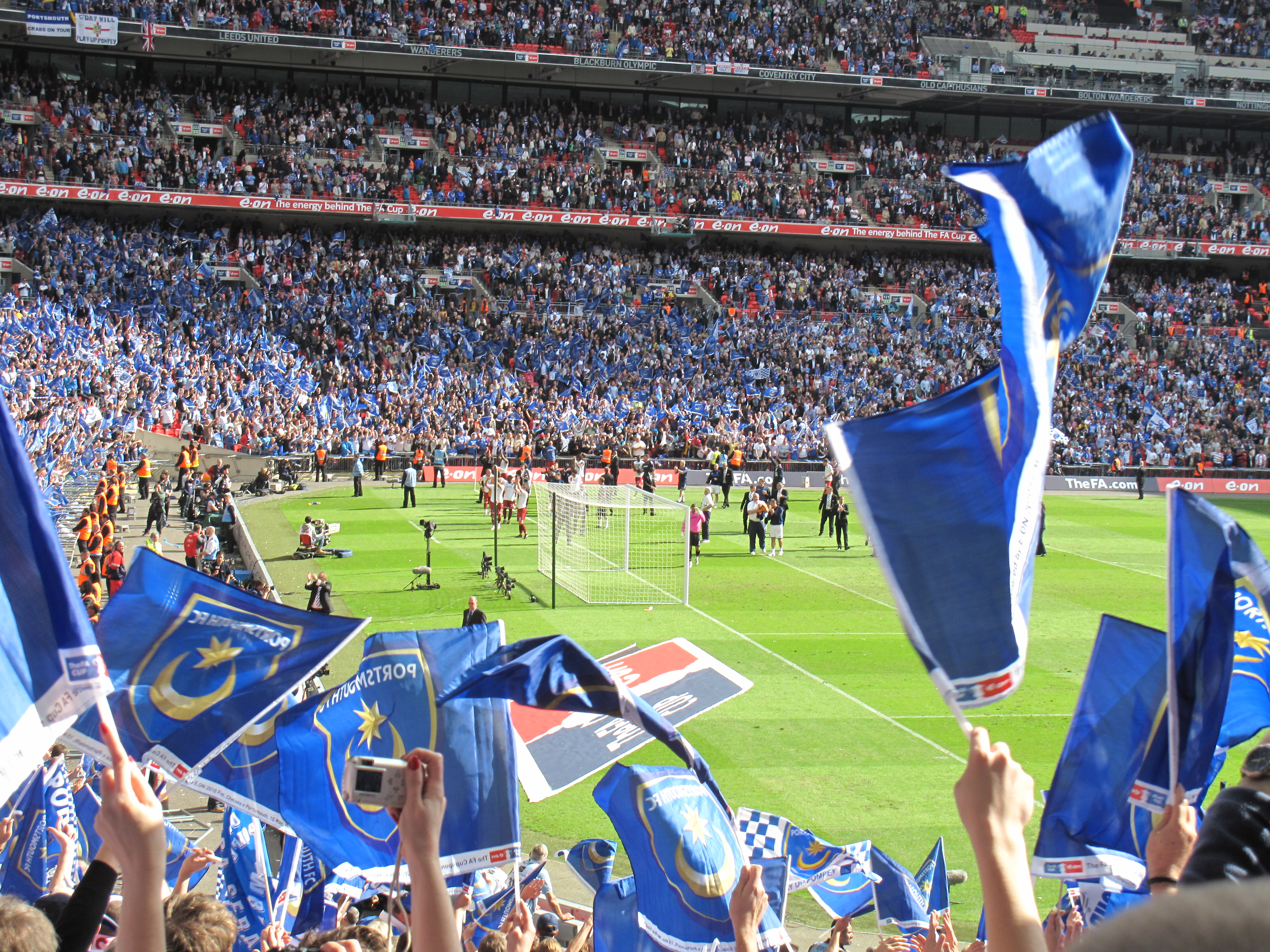
- Portsmouth fans at Wembley Stadium during the 2010 FA Cup Final
- Owner: Portpin (90%); Al Fahim Asia Associates Limited (10%)
- Manager: Avram Grant
- Stadium: Fratton Park
- Premier League: 20th (relegated)
- FA Cup: Runners-up
- League Cup: Quarter-finals
- Top goalscorer: League: Aruna Dindane (8); All: Frédéric Piquionne (11)
- Highest home attendance: 20,821 vs. Tottenham Hotspur (17 October 2009)
- Lowest home attendance: 14,323 vs. Wigan Athletic (14 April 2010)
- Average home league attendance: 17,572
Home colours	Away colours	Third colours

The 2009–10 season was Portsmouth's 111th in existence, their seventh season in the Premier League and their seventh consecutive season in the top division of English football. It was a season in which the club struggled with financial problems and entered administration.

The club finished at 20th place in the league, a place they had occupied since the second matchday, which meant relegation to the Championship. Portsmouth managed to only receive points in 14 of the 38 games, including only seven wins. In March they were docked nine points for entering administration.

Portsmouth's biggest success in the season came in the FA Cup, advancing to the final after beating Coventry City, Sunderland, Southampton, Birmingham City and Tottenham Hotspur. They played at Wembley Stadium in the final against Chelsea, a game that Chelsea won by 1–0. Portsmouth also participated in the League Cup and reached the quarter-finals.

Manager Paul Hart was sacked in November and replaced by Avram Grant, who stayed until the end of the season. French striker Frédéric Piquionne scored eleven goals throughout the season and was the club's top goalscorer.

== Team kit ==
For the third consecutive season, the team's kits were produced by Canterbury of New Zealand. The shirt sponsor was Jobsite, replacing OKI Printing Solutions, who had sponsored Portsmouth's kits since the 2005–06 season. The home strip returned to the traditional blue shirts, white shorts and red socks after the previous season's all-blue kit with gold trim. However, the blue of the home jersey was a lighter shade than the usual royal blue.

On 8 April 2010, Portsmouth announced a new five-year kit supply deal with Kappa. They wore a Kappa strip for the first time in the FA Cup semi-final on 11 April. For the 2010 FA Cup Final, Kappa produced a white and maroon kit with a salmon pink trim, referencing Portsmouth's original colours.

Home	Away	Third	FA Cup semi-final	FA Cup Final

== Ownership changes ==
The club started the season with great expectation after Sulaiman Al-Fahim bought the club from previous owner Alexandre Gaydamak for a fee around £60 million, but Al-Fahim's ownership only lasted 40 days until Ali Al-Faraj and his business Falcondrone Ltd. bought 90% of Al-Fahim's stake in Portsmouth; as part of the deal, Al-Fahim became non-executive chairman at the club until the end of the 2010–11 season. However, at the start of February 2010, al-Faraj lost his stake in Portsmouth to a debtor as part of a repayment agreement on one of his loans. In 2010, Balram Chainrai loaned former owner Ali al-Faraj £17 million, secured through collateral of Fratton Park grounds and the club itself. When the owner failed to pay meet a scheduled loan repayment, Chainrai took over control of the club. He intended to sell the club as soon as possible, and in the meantime he leased Fratton Park back to Portsmouth, with possible future rental yields of nearly a million pounds annually. On the morning of 26 February, a formal announcement was made that the club had entered administration and would be docked 9 points once three directors of the Premier League board had met to agree when the points should formally be taken. Andrew Andronikou, Peter Kubik and Michael Kiely of accountancy firm UHY Hacker Young were appointed by the club as administrators.

== Financial problems ==
Even before the season began Portsmouth saw a net transfer spend in the far negative, with key players such as Glen Johnson, Peter Crouch, Niko Kranjčar, and Sylvain Distin all departing the club. Although a team was assembled through cheap deals and loans, it soon became clear that Portsmouth had been depleted of quality and the team began sliding down to the bottom of the table, with the first seven league matches all being lost.

As the season progressed, the finances dried up and the club admitted on 1 October that some of their players and staff had not been paid. On 3 October, media outlets started to report that a deal was nearing completion for Ali al-Faraj to take control of the club. On Monday 5 October, a deal was agreed for Al Faraj and his associates via the British Virgin Islands-registered company Falcondrone to hold a 90% majority holding, with Al-Fahim retaining 10% stake and the title of non-executive chairman for two years. Falcondrone also agreed a deal with Gaydamak the right to buy, for £1, Miland Development (2004) Ltd, which owned various strategic pockets of land around the ground, once refinancing was complete. 2 days after the Al-Faraj takeover was completed, Portsmouth's former technical director Avram Grant returned as director of football.

On the pitch, Portsmouth's late transfer of funds called for a flurry of transfers at the end of the window, including the loan signing of Ivorian international Aruna Dindane, who would go on to score a hat-trick against Wigan Athletic. An opening run of seven defeats raised fears Hart would be sacked, but at the eighth attempt, at Molineux, Hassan Yebda (another loanee) headed in to secure the first win. Portsmouth were beaten 4–2 at Fratton Park by Aston Villa in the quarter finals of the League Cup, having beaten off Premiership high-flyers Stoke City; yet another loanee, Frédéric Piquionne, was on target twice. However, because of the financial problems, the Premier League placed the club under a transfer embargo, meaning the club were not allowed to sign any players.

Paul Hart was sacked by the board on 24 November, based on the poor results that left Portsmouth at the bottom of the league. He was offered the role of technical director responsible for players aged 18–21, but he declined. Coaches Paul Groves and Ian Woan took temporary charge of the team. On 26 November 2009, Portsmouth F.C. announced on its official website that Avram Grant had been appointed as manager.

On 3 December, it was announced that the club had failed to pay the players for the second consecutive month. On the 31st, it was announced player's wages would again be paid late, on 5 January 2010. According to common football contracts, the players then had the right to terminate their contracts and leave the club without any compensation for the club, upon giving 14 days notice. Despite the financial difficulties, Grant's time as manager was initially successful, having won two of his first four games in charge (against Sunderland and Liverpool) and only narrowly missing out on a point against league leaders Chelsea.

HM Revenue and Customs (HMRC) filed a winding-up petition against Portsmouth at the High Court in London on 23 December. HMRC claimed the club owed large sums in unpaid VAT on the club's net receipts from its negative transfer spend over the previous two years. Initially, the club denied the winding-up order and a statement was released via the club's website, in which the club stated that they expected the winding-up order to be retracted. The club applied to the High Court to strike out the winding-up petition. Tax lawyer Conrad McDonnell argued that the standard VAT treatment of football clubs, negotiated between the FA and HMRC, was wrong and legally no VAT should be charged on transfers of employees (players are employees), so that the whole HMRC debt was disputed. On 19 January 2010, the High Court dismissed the club's claim, although permission to appeal was granted and a statement from Portsmouth said the judge "considered an appeal to the Court of Appeal would have a 'real chance of success'". This meant that the case stayed open and HMRC were not able to proceed with an immediate winding-up as they wanted.

Meanwhile, it was announced on 5 January that the Premier League were to use Portsmouth's share of the latest installment of television broadcast monies to pay off the club's debts to other top-flight sides. Chelsea, Tottenham and Watford were all owed money by Portsmouth (as were Udinese and Lens). The Premier League split £7 million between them. The action is allowed within league rules to protect clubs that are owed money from transfers.

On 26 January, the Premier League partially lifted the transfer embargo, and allowed the club to sign and register loanees and players not registered to other clubs. Portsmouth managed to sell a few players, raising hope that bills and staff might get paid on time. On 28 January, the club's deep financial trouble was further highlighted by the temporary closure of the Portsmouth website, after the club failed to pay their bills for its upkeep to their Bournemouth-based digital agency Juicy. The website was back live several hours later, after Juicy announced a new financial arrangement with Portsmouth. It appeared on 2 February that staff and players were not paid their wages on time for the fourth time in five months, causing Portsmouth's PFA representative to call for more openness from within the club.

On 4 February, Portsmouth was taken over by its fourth owner in one season: Balram Chainrai. A Nepalese businessman based in Hong Kong, Chainrai took over Portsmouth as part of a clause in a loan deal he made with the previous owners. He is thought to have given the club between £15 and £20 million, but the debts were not repaid.

A full court hearing of HMRC's winding-up petition was held on 10 February and the club was given a "stay-of-execution" for a further seven days with a view to securing a new buyer. If the club did not enter administration or HMRC did not recover its money, the club could have been wound up by the Court and a liquidator appointed.

On 26 February, having not secured a new buyer before the 25 February deadline, Portsmouth prepared to enter administration, and appointed UHY Hacker Young as administrators. On the morning of 26 February, a formal announcement was made that the club had entered administration and would be docked nine points once three directors of the Premier League board had met to agree when the points should formally be taken. The Premier League decided to delay their decision until the court case on 15 March decided the club's fate. After beating Birmingham City 2–0 on 6 March, Portsmouth qualified for the FA Cup semi-final, to face Tottenham Hotspur at Wembley on 11 April. On 11 March, the HMRC withdrew their winding-up order, having contested the validity of the administration that was implemented on 26 February, after receiving documentation proving its validity. On 12 March Peter Storrie stepped down as the club's CEO, though he remained at the club in the short term as a consultant to the administrator.

On 15 March, a consortium fronted by Rob Lloyd entered a period of exclusivity to buy Portsmouth. Rob Lloyd met 19 invited Portsmouth fans at the Hilton Portsmouth on Sunday 14th to outline his group's plans and to answer questions from the fans.

On 17 March, Portsmouth were docked nine points for entering administration. That only confirmed a relegation that was always inevitable, with Portsmouth being last in the league on actual points as well. Portsmouth reached the 2010 FA Cup Final against Chelsea, losing the match 1–0, but would have normally been qualified to the UEFA Europa League as Chelsea had qualified for the higher ranked Champions League. However, Portsmouth was denied entry due to its financial state, with Premier League's 7th-placed team Liverpool taking over its place.

On 24 March, administrator Andrew Andronikou revealed that the club would be looking to start the next season with a whole new squad. Players with expiring contracts would be allowed to leave and Portsmouth were looking to sell between eight and ten players. Overall, up to 20 players could leave at the end of the season. The club would be looking to build their team from free transfers in the summer transfer window to save money.

== Players ==
=== First-team squad ===
Squad at end of season

Note: Flags indicate national team as defined under FIFA eligibility rules; some limited exceptions apply. Players may hold more than one non-FIFA nationality.

No.	Pos.	Nation	Player
1	GK	ENG	David James (captain)
3	DF	POR	Ricardo Rocha
4	MF	RSA	Aaron Mokoena
5	MF	ENG	Jamie O'Hara (on loan from Tottenham Hotspur)
6	MF	ENG	Hayden Mullins
7	DF	ISL	Hermann Hreiðarsson
8	MF	SEN	Papa Bouba Diop
9	FW	FRA	Frédéric Piquionne (Note: Piquionne was born in Nouméa, New Caledonia, but also qualified to represent France and Martinique internationally and made his international debut for France in March 2007 and for Martinique in 2012.) (on loan from Lyon)
11	MF	ENG	Michael Brown
15	GK	FIN	Antti Niemi
16	DF	IRL	Steve Finnan
17	FW	NGA	John Utaka
18	DF	BEL	Anthony Vanden Borre (Note: Vanden Borre was born in Likasi, Zaire (now Democratic Republic of the Congo), but was raised in Belgium and represented Belgium at U-16, U-17 and U-21 level before making his international debut for Belgium in April 2004.) (on loan from Genoa)
19	FW	ENG	Danny Webber
20	FW	ENG	Tommy Smith
21	GK	ENG	Jamie Ashdown
22	MF	SCO	Richard Hughes

No.	Pos.	Nation	Player
23	MF	GHA	Kevin-Prince Boateng (Note: Boateng was born in West Berlin, West Germany (now Berlin, Germany), and represented Germany at U-19, U-20 and U-21 level, but also qualified to represent Ghana internationally through his father and made his international debut for Ghana in June 2010.)
24	FW	CIV	Aruna Dindane (on loan from Lens)
26	DF	ISR	Tal Ben Haim
27	FW	NGA	Nwankwo Kanu
31	GK	ENG	Liam O'Brien
32	MF	ALG	Hassan Yebda (Note: Yebda was born in Saint-Maurice, France, and represented France at U-16, U-17, U-18, and U-19 level, but also qualified to represent Algeria internationally and made his international debut for Algeria in October 2009.) (on loan from Benfica)
33	MF	GRE	Angelos Basinas
35	DF	IRL	Marc Wilson (Note: Wilson was born in Aghagallon, Northern Ireland, and represented Northern Ireland at U-15 level, but also qualified to represent the Republic of Ireland internationally and represented the Republic of Ireland at U-18, U-19 and U-21 level before making his international debut for the Republic of Ireland in February 2011.)
37	FW	FRA	Gaël N'Lundulu
38	MF	ENG	Marlon Pack
39	DF	ALG	Nadir Belhadj (Note: Belhadj was born in Saint-Claude, France, and represented France at U-18 level, but also qualified to represent Algeria internationally through his parents and made his international debut for Algeria in March 2004.)
40	DF	ENG	Joel Ward
41	MF	ENG	Matt Ritchie (Note: Ritchie was born in Gosport, England, but also qualified to represent Scotland internationally through his father and made his international debut for Scotland in March 2015.)
43	DF	ENG	James Hurst
44	DF	ENG	Luke Wilkinson
46	DF	GER	Lennard Sowah
47	FW	NED	Nadir Çiftçi (Note: Çiftçi was born in Karakoçan, Turkey, but also qualified to represent the Netherlands internationally and represented the Netherlands at U-17 level and Turkey at U-19 level.)

=== Left club during season ===
Note: Flags indicate national team as defined under FIFA eligibility rules; some limited exceptions apply. Players may hold more than one non-FIFA nationality.

No.	Pos.	Nation	Player
2	DF	ENG	Linvoy Primus (retired)
3	DF	FRA	Younès Kaboul (to Tottenham Hotspur)
10	FW	ENG	David Nugent (on loan to Burnley)
14	DF	ENG	Mike Williamson (to Newcastle United)
14	FW	GHA	Quincy Owusu-Abeyie (Note: Quincy was born in Amsterdam, the Netherlands, and represented the Netherlands at U-21 level, but also qualified to represent Ghana internationally through his parents and made his international debut for Ghana in January 2008.) (on loan from Spartak Moscow)

No.	Pos.	Nation	Player
15	DF	FRA	Sylvain Distin (to Everton)
19	MF	CRO	Niko Kranjčar (to Tottenham Hotspur)
25	DF	SRB	Duško Tošić (on loan to Queen's Park Rangers)
31	GK	BIH	Asmir Begović (Note: Begović was born in Trebinje, SFR Yugoslavia (now Bosnia and Herzegovina), but was raised in Germany between the ages of 4 and 10 and in Canada from the age of 10 and represented Canada at U-20 level before making his international debut for Bosnia and Herzegovina in October 2009.) (to Stoke City)
42	MF	FRA	Gauthier Mahoto (to Bastia)

== Statistics ==
=== Appearances and goals ===
No.	Pos.	Name	League		FA Cup		League Cup		Total		Discipline	
No.	Pos.	Name	Apps	Goals	Apps	Goals	Apps	Goals	Apps	Goals	Yellow card	Red card
1	GK	(England) David James	25	0	4	0	0	0	29	0	3	0
3	DF	(France) Younès Kaboul	19	3	4	0	2	0	25	3	5	1
3	DF	(Portugal) Ricardo Rocha	10	0	2	0	0	0	12	0	0	2
4	MF	(South Africa) Aaron Mokoena	21+2	0	4	1	2+1	0	27+3	1	7	0
5	MF	(England) Jamie O'Hara	25+1	2	3	1	0	0	28+1	2	8	0
6	MF	(England) Hayden Mullins	15+3	0	4+2	0	2	0	21+5	0	3	0
7	DF	(Iceland) Hermann Hreiðarsson	17	1	5	0	1	0	23	1	2	0
8	MF	(Senegal) Papa Bouba Diop	9+3	0	5+2	0	0	0	14+5	0	1	0
9	FW	(France) Frédéric Piquionne	26+8	5	6+1	3	2+2	3	34+11	11	2	0
10	FW	(England) David Nugent	0+3	0	0+1	0	0	0	0+4	0	0	0
11	MF	(England) Michael Brown	22+2	2	6	0	2+1	0	30+3	2	6	1
14	MF	(Ghana) Quincy Owusu-Abeyie	3+7	0	0	0	0+1	1	3+8	1	0	0
15	DF	(France) Sylvain Distin	3	0	0	0	0	0	3	0	0	0
16	DF	(Republic of Ireland) Steve Finnan	20+1	0	4	0	0	0	24+1	0	1	0
17	FW	(Nigeria) John Utaka	10+8	1	3+4	2	3	1	16+12	4	2	0
18	DF	(Belgium) Anthony Vanden Borre	15+4	0	2	0	4	1	21+4	1	2	1
19	MF	(Croatia) Niko Kranjčar	4	0	1	1	0	0	5	1	0	0
19	FW	(England) Danny Webber	4+13	1	1+3	0	3	2	8+16	1	1	0
20	FW	(England) Tommy Smith	12+4	1	2	0	0	0	0	0	0	0
21	GK	(England) Jamie Ashdown	5+1	0	1	0	1	0	14+4	1	0	0
22	MF	(Scotland) Richard Hughes	9+1	0	1+2	0	2+1	1	12+4	1	5	0
23	MF	(Ghana) Kevin-Prince Boateng	20+2	3	5	2	0	0	25+2	5	9	0
24	FW	(Ivory Coast) Aruna Dindane	18+1	8	3	1	2	1	23+1	10	7	0
26	DF	(Israel) Tal Ben Haim	21+1	0	1	0	1	0	23+1	0	4	0
27	FW	(Nigeria) Nwankwo Kanu	6+17	2	0+1	0	0+4	2	6+22	4	0	0
31	GK	(Bosnia and Herzegovina) Asmir Begović	8+1	0	3	0	3	0	14+1	0	1	0
32	MF	(Algeria) Hassan Yebda	15+3	2	2	0	3	0	20+3	2	3	0
33	MF	(Greece) Angelos Basinas	7+5	0	1+2	0	2	0	10+7	0	3	0
35	DF	(Republic of Ireland) Marc Wilson	28	0	6	0	1+1	0	35+1	0	3	0
39	DF	(Algeria) Nadir Belhadj	16+3	3	2+1	1	4	0	22+4	4	2	0
40	DF	(England) Joel Ward	1+2	0	0	0	1	0	2+2	0	1	0
41	DF	(England) Matt Ritchie	1+1	0	0	0	0	0	1+1	0	0	0
46	DF	(Germany) Lennard Sowah	3+2	0	0	0	0	0	3+2	0	0	0

== Top scorers ==
No.	Pos.	Name	League	FA Cup	League Cup	Total
9	FW	(France) Frédéric Piquionne	5	2	3	10
24	FW	(Ivory Coast) Aruna Dindane	5	1	1	7
39	DF	(Algeria) Nadir Belhadj	4	1	0	5
23	MF	(Ghana) Kevin-Prince Boateng	3	1	0	4
27	FW	(Nigeria) Nwankwo Kanu	2	0	2	4
3	DF	(France) Younès Kaboul	3	0	0	3
17	FW	(Nigeria) John Utaka	0	2	1	3
19	ST	(England) Danny Webber	1	0	2	3
32	MF	(Algeria) Hassan Yebda	2	0	0	2
5	MF	(England) Jamie O'Hara	1	1	0	2
7	MF	(Iceland) Hermann Hreiðarsson	1	0	0	1
17	FW	(South Africa) Aaron Mokoena	0	1	0	1
18	DF	(Belgium) Anthony Vanden Borre	0	0	1	1
22	MF	(Scotland) Richard Hughes	0	0	1	1

== Transfers ==
=== In ===
Permanent

Date	Position	Name	From	Fee
1 July 2009	DF	(South Africa) Aaron Mokoena	Blackburn Rovers	Free
31 July 2009	DF	(Republic of Ireland) Steve Finnan	(Spain) Espanyol	Free
7 August 2009	GK	(Finland) Antti Niemi	Unattached	Free
27 August 2009	ST	Tommy Smith	Watford	£1.8M
28 August 2009	MF	Michael Brown	Wigan	Nominal
28 August 2009	MF	(Germany) Kevin-Prince Boateng	Tottenham Hotspur	£4.0M
31 August 2009	DF	(Israel) Tal Ben Haim	Manchester City	Undisclosed
1 September 2009	DF	Mike Williamson	Watford	£3.0M
1 September 2009	FW	Danny Webber	Sheffield United	Free
3 February 2010	DF	(Portugal) Ricardo Rocha	(Belgium) Standard Liège	Free
12 February 2010	DF	(Serbia) Duško Tošić	(Germany) Werder Bremen	Free

Loan

Date	Pos.	Name	From	Return date
5 August 2009	FW	(France) Frédéric Piquionne	(France) Lyon	End of season
13 August 2009	DF	(Belgium) Anthony Vanden Borre	(Italy) Genoa	End of season
28 August 2009	ST	(Ivory Coast) Aruna Dindane	(France) Lens	End of season
28 August 2009	MF	Jamie O'Hara	Tottenham Hotspur	15 January 2010
1 September 2009	MF	(Algeria) Hassan Yebda	(Portugal) Benfica	End of season
29 January 2010	FW	(Ghana) Quincy Owusu-Abeyie	(Russia) Spartak Moscow	31 March 2010
29 January 2010	MF	Jamie O'Hara	Tottenham Hotspur	End of season

=== Out ===
Permanent

Date	Position	Name	To	Fee
19 June 2009	DF	(Mali) Djimi Traoré	(France) Monaco	Free
26 June 2009	DF	Glen Johnson	Liverpool	£17.0M
1 July 2009	DF	(Wales) Geraint Price	Stewarts & Lloyds Corby	Free
1 July 2009	DF	Sol Campbell	Notts County	Free
1 July 2009	DF	Andre Blackman	Bristol City	Free
1 July 2009	DF	Ryan Woodford	Havant & Waterlooville	Free
1 July 2009	MF	Sean Davis	Bolton Wanderers	Free
1 July 2009	MF	Louis Castles	Bognor Regis Town	Free
1 July 2009	MF	Jerome Thomas	West Bromwich Albion	Free
1 July 2009	MF	Glen Little	Sheffield United	Free
1 July 2009	MF	(Cameroon) Lauren	(Spain) Córdoba CF	Free
1 July 2009	MF	(France) Noé Pamarot	(Spain) Hércules	Free
1 July 2009	MF	(Republic of Ireland) Joe Collins	Unattached	Free
1 July 2009	FW	(Belgium) Andréa Mbuyi-Mutombo	(Belgium) Standard Liège	Free
27 July 2009	FW	Peter Crouch	Tottenham Hotspur	£9.0M
7 August 2009	MF	(France) Arnold Mvuemba	(France) Lorient	Free
12 August 2009	DF	Martin Cranie	Coventry City	£0.5M
27 August 2009	DF	(France) Sylvain Distin	Everton	£6.0M
1 September 2009	MF	(Croatia) Niko Kranjčar	Tottenham Hotspur	£2.5M
7 December 2009	DF	Linvoy Primus	Unattached	Retired
27 January 2010	DF	Mike Williamson	Newcastle United	£1.0M
27 January 2010	DF	(France) Younès Kaboul	Tottenham Hotspur	£6.0M
1 February 2010	GK	(Bosnia and Herzegovina) Asmir Begović	Stoke City	£3.25M
1 February 2010	MF	(France) Gauthier Mahoto	(France) Bastia	Free
24 March 2010	GK	(Finland) Antti Niemi	Unattached	Contract terminated
31 March 2010	MF	(Ghana) Quincy Owusu-Abeyie	(Qatar) Al Sadd	Loan terminated

Loan

Date	Pos.	Name	To	Return date
27 July 2009	FW	(Australia) Ryan Gazet Du Chattelier	Weymouth	September 2009
28 July 2009	DF	Callum Reynolds	Luton Town	22 January 2010
1 September 2009	MF	Matt Ritchie	Notts County	31 December 2009
1 September 2009	FW	David Nugent	Burnley	25 January 2010
1 September 2009	MF	Tom Kilbey	Dagenham & Redbridge	1 October 2009
14 October 2009	GK	(Bosnia and Herzegovina) Asmir Begović	Ipswich Town	23 November 2009
2 January 2010	FW	Paris Cowan-Hall	Grimsby Town	End of season
5 January 2010	DF	Luke Wilkinson	Northampton Town	5 February 2010
7 January 2010	MF	Marlon Pack	Dagenham and Redbridge	5 February 2010
1 February 2010	FW	David Nugent	Burnley	End of season
25 March 2010	DF	(Serbia) Duško Tošić	Queens Park Rangers	End of season

== Matches ==
=== Pre-season ===
Date	Opponents	H / A	Result F – A	Scorers	Attendance
21 July 2009	Havant & Waterlooville	A	2 – 2	Bopp 58', 62'	3,216
25 July 2009	Basingstoke Town	A	0 – 0		1,588
27 July 2009	Eastleigh	A	1 – 6	Kaboul 5' Cowan-Hall 10' Subotić 26' Nugent 75', 80', 88'	1,401
31 July 2009	Vitória de Guimarães	A	2 – 0	Rui Miguel 57' Custódio 87'
1 August 2009	Benfica	A	4 – 0	Cardozo 16', 41' Weldon 71' Wilkinson (o.g.) 86'
8 August 2009	Rangers	H	2 – 0	Piquionne 31', 51'	9,018
8 August 2009	Gosport Borough	H	0 – 3	Ritchie 13', Ashikodi **', Subotić **'	832

=== Competitions ===
Date	Opponents	Tournament	H/A	Result	Scorers	Attendance	Referee
15 August 2009	Fulham	Premier League	H	0 – 1		17,510	Martin Atkinson
19 August 2009	Birmingham City	Premier League	A	0 – 1		19,922	Lee Probert
22 August 2009	Arsenal	Premier League	A	1 – 4	Kaboul 37'	60,049	Steve Bennett
25 August 2009	Hereford	League Cup	H	4 – 1	Piquionne 20', Utaka 23', Kranjčar 43', Hughes 56'	6,645	Andy D'Urso
30 August 2009	Man City	Premier League	H	0 – 1		17,826	Howard Webb
12 September 2009	Bolton	Premier League	H	2 – 3	Kaboul 25', Boateng 43'	17,564	Chris Foy
19 September 2009	Aston Villa	Premier League	A	0 – 2		35,979	Stuart Attwell
22 September 2009	Carlisle Utd	League Cup	A	3 – 1	Dindane 26', Webber 32', Vanden Borre 62'	7,042	Neil Swarbrick
26 September 2009	Everton	Premier League	H	0 – 1		18,116	Alan Wiley
3 October 2009	Wolverhampton Wanderers	Premier League	A	1 – 0	Yebda 19'	29,023	Howard Webb
17 October 2009	Tottenham Hotspur	Premier League	H	1 – 2	Boateng 59'	20,821	Phil Dowd
24 October 2009	Hull City	Premier League	A	0 – 0		23,720	Stuart Attwell
27 October 2009	Stoke City	League Cup	H	4 – 0	Piquionne 17', 59', Webber 55', Kanu 81'	11,251	Peter Walton
31 October 2009	Wigan Athletic	Premier League	H	4 – 0	Dindane, Piquionne 45+3'	18,212	Alan Wiley
7 November 2009	Blackburn Rovers	Premier League	A	1 – 3	O'Hara 15'	23,110	Andre Marriner
22 November 2009	Stoke City	Premier League	A	0 – 1		27,069	Kevin Friend
28 November 2009	Manchester United	Premier League	H	1 – 4	Boateng 32' (pen.)	20,482	Mike Dean
1 December 2009	Aston Villa	League Cup	H	2 – 4	Petrov 10' (o.g.), Kanu 87'	17,034	Lee Mason
5 December 2009	Burnley	Premier League	H	2 – 0	Hreiðarsson 65', Dindane 84'	17,822	Phil Dowd
12 December 2009	Sunderland	Premier League	A	1 – 1	Kaboul 90+3'	37,578	Steve Bennett
16 December 2009	Chelsea	Premier League	A	1 – 2	Piquionne 59'	40,137	Mark Clattenburg
19 December 2009	Liverpool	Premier League	H	2 – 0	Belhadj 33', Piquionne 82'	20,534	Lee Mason
26 December 2009	West Ham United	Premier League	A	0 – 2		33,686	Lee Probert
30 December 2009	Arsenal	Premier League	H	1 – 4	Belhadj 74'	20,404	Alan Wiley
2 January 2010	Coventry City	FA Cup	H	1 – 1	Boateng 45'	11,214	Phil Dowd
12 January 2010	Coventry City	FA Cup	A	2 – 1	Wright 90' (o.g.), Mokoena 120+1'	7,097	Mike Jones
23 January 2010	Sunderland	FA Cup	H	2 – 1	Utaka 42', 57'	10,315	Peter Walton
26 January 2010	West Ham	Premier League	H	1 – 1	Webber 76'	18,322	Andre Marriner
31 January 2010	Manchester City	Premier League	A	0 – 2		44,015	Martin Atkinson
3 February 2010	Fulham	Premier League	A	0 – 1		21,934	Anthony Taylor
6 February 2010	Manchester United	Premier League	A	0 – 5		74,684	Lee Mason
9 February 2010	Sunderland	Premier League	H	1 – 1	Dindane 90+5'	16,242	Kevin Friend
13 February 2010	Southampton	FA Cup	A	4 – 1	Owusu-Abeyie 66', Dindane 75', Belhadj 82', O'Hara 85'	31,385	Howard Webb
20 February 2010	Stoke City	Premier League	H	1 – 2	Piquionne 35'	17,208	Mike Dean
27 February 2010	Burnley	Premier League	A	2 – 1	Piquionne 25', Yebda 76' (pen.)	19,714	Mark Clattenburg
6 March 2010	Birmingham City	FA Cup	H	2 – 0	Piquionne 67', 70'	20,456	Steve Bennett
9 March 2010	Birmingham City	Premier League	H	1 – 2	Kanu 90+2'	18,465	Mike Jones
15 March 2010	Liverpool	Premier League	A	1 – 4	Belhadj 88'	40,316	Stuart Attwell
20 March 2010	Hull City	Premier League	H	3 – 2	Smith 37', O'Hara 88', Kanu 89'	16,513	Phil Dowd
24 March 2010	Chelsea	Premier League	H	0 – 5		18,753	Lee Mason
27 March 2010	Tottenham Hotspur	Premier League	A	0 – 2		35,870	Kevin Friend
3 April 2010	Blackburn Rovers	Premier League	H	0 – 0		16,207	Steve Bennett
11 April 2010	Tottenham Hotspur	FA Cup	N	2 – 0	Piquionne 99', Boateng 117' (pen.)	84,602	Alan Wiley
14 April 2010	Wigan Athletic	Premier League	A	0 – 0		14,323	Mike Dean
18 April 2010	Aston Villa	Premier League	H	1 – 2	Brown 10'	16,523	Lee Probert
24 April 2010	Bolton Wanderers	Premier League	A	2 – 2	Dindane 54', 68'	20,526	Howard Webb
1 May 2010	Wolverhampton Wanderers	Premier League	H	3 – 1	Dindane 20', Utaka 39', Brown 67'	19,213	Mike Jones
9 May 2010	Everton	Premier League	A	0 – 1		38,730	Peter Walton
15 May 2010	Chelsea	FA Cup	N	0 – 1		88,335	Chris Foy

== Premier League ==
=== Results by round ===
Round	1	2	3	4	5	6	7	8	9	10	11	12	13	14	15	16	17	18	19	20	21	22	23	24	25	26	27	28	29	30	31	32	33	34	35	36	37	38
Ground	H	A	A	H	H	A	H	A	H	A	H	A	A	H	H	A	A	H	A	H	H	A	A	A	H	H	A	H	A	H	H	A	H	A	H	A	H	A
Result	L	L	L	L	L	L	L	W	L	D	W	L	L	L	W	D	L	W	L	L	D	L	L	L	D	L	W	L	L	W	L	L	D	D	L	D	W	L
Position	15	20	20	20	20	20	20	20	20	20	20	20	20	20	20	20	20	20	20	20	20	20	20	20	20	20	20	20	20	20	20	20	20	20	20	20	20	20

A = Away; H = Home; W = Win; D = Draw; L = Loss

=== Final league table ===
Pos	Team	Pld	W	D	L	GF	GA	GD	Pts	Qualification or relegation
16	Wigan Athletic	38	9	9	20	37	79	−42	36	
17	West Ham United	38	8	11	19	47	66	−19	35	
18	Burnley (R)	38	8	6	24	42	82	−40	30	Relegation to Football League Championship
19	Hull City (R)	38	6	12	20	34	75	−41	30	Relegation to Football League Championship
20	Portsmouth (R)	38	7	7	24	34	66	−32	19 (Note: Portsmouth were docked nine points for entering administration.)	Relegation to Football League Championship

Source: Barclays Premier League
(R) Relegated
