= UHY =

UHY may refer to:

- UHY Hacker Young
- Uhy (Kladno District)
