= 2008–09 Portsmouth F.C. season =

Portsmouth
2008–09 season
- Owner: Alexandre Gaydamak
- Manager: Harry Redknapp (to 26 October 2008); Tony Adams (to 9 February 2009); Paul Hart (caretaker manager)
- Stadium: Fratton Park
- Premier League: 14th
- FA Cup: Fourth round
- League Cup: Third round
- Community Shield: Runners-up
- UEFA Cup: Group stage
- Top goalscorer: League: Peter Crouch (11); All: Peter Crouch (16)
- Highest home attendance: 20,540 vs. Manchester Utd (25 August 2008)
- Lowest home attendance: 18,111 vs. Blackburn Rovers (30 November 2008)
- Average home league attendance: 19,325
- Biggest win: 3–0 vs. Everton (30 August 2008)
- Biggest defeat: 0–6 vs. Manchester City (21 September 2008)
| Home colours | Away colours | Third colours |

During the 2008–09 football season Portsmouth played their sixth consecutive season in the highest tier of English football, the Premier League. Thanks to the exploits of the previous season, Portsmouth achieved European football for the first time in their footballing history, thanks to an FA Cup win over Cardiff City; they competed in the UEFA Cup. They also participated in the Charity Shield, against Manchester United on 10 August 2008, at Wembley Stadium, eventually losing on penalties. This was the first time since 1996 that a team outside of the "Big Four" had competed in the competition.

== Players ==
=== Squad ===
As of 24 May 2009

Note: Flags indicate national team as defined under FIFA eligibility rules; some limited exceptions apply. Players may hold more than one non-FIFA nationality.

| No. | Pos. | Nation | Player |
|---|---|---|---|
| 1 | GK | ENG | David James |
| 2 | DF | ENG | Linvoy Primus |
| 3 | DF | FRA | Younès Kaboul |
| 4 | DF | CMR | Lauren |
| 5 | DF | ENG | Glen Johnson |
| 6 | MF | ENG | Hayden Mullins |
| 7 | DF | ISL | Hermann Hreiðarsson |
| 8 | MF | SEN | Papa Bouba Diop |
| 9 | FW | ENG | Peter Crouch |
| 10 | FW | ENG | David Nugent |
| 11 | MF | ENG | Jerome Thomas |
| 13 | MF | ENG | Jermaine Pennant (on loan from Liverpool) |
| 15 | DF | FRA | Sylvain Distin |
| 16 | DF | FRA | Noé Pamarot |
| 17 | FW | NGA | John Utaka |

| No. | Pos. | Nation | Player |
|---|---|---|---|
| 18 | MF | FRA | Arnold Mvuemba |
| 19 | MF | CRO | Niko Kranjčar |
| 20 | DF | ENG | Martin Cranie |
| 21 | GK | ENG | Jamie Ashdown |
| 22 | MF | SCO | Richard Hughes |
| 23 | DF | ENG | Sol Campbell (captain) |
| 26 | MF | POR | Pelé (on loan from Porto) |
| 27 | FW | NGA | Nwankwo Kanu |
| 28 | MF | ENG | Sean Davis |
| 29 | FW | GRE | Theofanis Gekas (on loan from Bayer Leverkusen) |
| 30 | DF | FRA | Armand Traoré (on loan from Arsenal) |
| 31 | GK | BIH | Asmir Begović |
| 33 | FW | GRE | Angelos Basinas |
| 35 | DF | IRL | Marc Wilson |
| 39 | DF | ALG | Nadir Belhadj |

== Transfers ==
=== In ===
| No. | Pos. | Player | Transferred From | Fee | Date | Source |
|---|---|---|---|---|---|---|
| - | DF | (England) James Hurst | (England) West Bromwich Albion | Undisclosed | 1 July 2008 | |
| - | FW | (France) Gaël N’Lundulu | (France) Paris Saint-Germain | Undisclosed | 1 July 2008 | |
| - | MF | (France) Gauthier Mahoto | (France) Le Havre | Undisclosed | 1 July 2008 | |
| - | FW | (Turkey) Nadir Çiftçi | (Netherlands) ADO Den Haag | Undisclosed | 1 July 2008 | |
| 25 | MF | (England) Glen Little | (England) Reading | Free Transfer | 1 July 2008 | |
| 9 | FW | (England) Peter Crouch | (England) Liverpool | £11,000,000 | 11 July 2008 | |
| - | FW | (The Gambia) Omar Koroma | (The Gambia) Banjul Hawks | Undisclosed | 4 August 2008 | |
| 3 | DF | (France) Younès Kaboul | (England) Tottenham Hotspur | Undisclosed | 11 August 2008 | |
| 11 | MF | (England) Jerome Thomas | (England) Charlton Athletic | Undisclosed | 21 August 2008 | |
| - | GK | (England) Jon Stewart | (England) Weymouth | Free Transfer | 31 August 2008 | — |
| 39 | DF | (Algeria) Nadir Belhadj | (France) Lens | £4,400,000 | 1 January 2009 | |
| - | MF | (Ghana) Torric Jebrin | (Ghana) Hearts of Oak | Undisclosed | 1 January 2009 | — |
| 6 | MF | (England) Hayden Mullins | (England) West Ham United | Undisclosed | 26 January 2009 | |
| 33 | MF | (Greece) Angelos Basinas | (Greece) AEK Athens | Undisclosed | 2 February 2009 | |

=== Out ===
| No. | Pos. | Player | Transferred to | Fee | Date | Source |
|---|---|---|---|---|---|---|
| 34 | FW | (Cameroon) Franck Songo'o | (Spain) Real Zaragoza | Free Transfer | 1 July 2008 | — |
| 11 | MF | (Ghana) Sulley Muntari | (Italy) Internazionale | £12,700,000 | 28 July 2008 | |
| 30 | MF | (Portugal) Pedro Mendes | (Scotland) Rangers | £3,000,000 | 15 August 2008 | |
| - | MF | (France) Jean-Francois Christophe | (England) Southend United | Free Transfer | 1 September 2008 | — |
| 6 | MF | (France) Lassana Diarra | (Spain) Real Madrid | £20,000,000 | 1 January 2009 | |
| 14 | FW | (England) Jermain Defoe | (England) Tottenham Hotspur | £15,000,000 | 9 January 2009 | |
| 24 | DF | (Wales) Richard Duffy | (England) Millwall | Free Transfer | 2 February 2009 | |

=== Loaned in ===
| No. | Pos. | Player | Loaned From | Until | Date | Source |
|---|---|---|---|---|---|---|
| 26 | FW | (Israel) Ben Sahar | (England) Chelsea | 1 January 2009 | 1 July 2008 | |
| 30 | DF | (France) Armand Traoré | (England) Arsenal | End of Season | 21 August 2008 | |
| 39 | DF | (Algeria) Nadir Belhadj | (France) Lens | End of Season | 1 September 2008 | |
| 14 | MF | (England) Jermaine Pennant | (England) Liverpool | End of Season | 20 January 2009 | |
| 26 | MF | (Portugal) Pelé | (Portugal) Porto | End of Season | 26 January 2009 | |
| 29 | FW | (Greece) Theofanis Gekas | (Germany) Bayer Leverkusen | End of Season | 1 February 2009 | |

=== Loaned out ===
| No. | Pos. | Player | Loaned to | Until | Date | Source |
|---|---|---|---|---|---|---|
| - | FW | (The Gambia) Omar Koroma | (England) Norwich City | End of Season | 4 August 2008 | |
| - | FW | (Switzerland) Danijel Subotić | (Belgium) Zulte Waregem | 1 December 2008 | 5 August 2008 | — |
| 31 | GK | (Bosnia and Herzegovina) Asmir Begović | (England) Yeovil Town | 6 November 2008 | 7 August 2008 | |
| - | DF | (England) Joel Ward | (England) AFC Bournemouth | End of Season | 7 August 2008 | — |
| 2 | DF | (England) Linvoy Primus | (England) Charlton Athletic | 1 December 2008 | 28 August 2008 | |
| 36 | MF | (England) Matt Ritchie | (England) Dagenham & Redbridge | End of Season | 1 September 2008 | — |
| 20 | DF | (England) Martin Cranie | (England) Charlton Athletic | 1 January 2009 | 2 September 2008 | |
| - | FW | (Switzerland) Danijel Subotić | (England) Southend United | End of Season | 1 January 2009 | — |
| 32 | DF | (Mali) Djimi Traoré | (England) Birmingham City | 14 May 2009 | 10 February 2009 | |
| 25 | MF | (England) Glen Little | (England) Reading | End of Season | 8 March 2009 | |

== Statistics ==
=== Appearances ===
==== Goalkeepers ====
| No. | Name | Position | Date of Birth | Nationality | League App. | Domestic Cups | UEFA Cup App. | Clean Sheets | Goals conceded | (yellow card) / (red card) |
| 1 | David James | Goalkeeper | 01-08-1970 | England | 36 | 4 | 5 | 9 (+4) | 55 (+16) | 2 / 0 |
| 21 | Jamie Ashdown | Goalkeeper | 30-11-1980 | England | 0 | 0 | 1 | 1 | 0 | 0 / 0 |
| 31 | Asmir Begović | Goalkeeper | 20-06-1987 | Bosnia and Herzegovina | 2 | 0 | 0 | 0 | 2 | 0 / 0 |

==== Defenders ====
| No. | Name | Position | Date of Birth | Nationality | League App. | Domestic Cups | UEFA Cup App. | Goals Scored | Assists | (yellow card) / (red card) |
| 3 | Younès Kaboul | Central Defender | 04-01-1986 | France | 17 (3) | 2 (1) | 1 (1) | 1 (+1) | 1 | 4 (+1) / 0 |
| 5 | Glen Johnson | Right back | 23-08-1984 | England | 29 | 2 | 4 | 3 | 6 (+3) | 9 (+3) / 1 |
| 7 | Hermann Hreiðarsson | Left back/Central Defender | 11-07-1974 | Iceland | 19 (4) | 1 (2) | 2 (1) | 2 (+1) | 0 | 7 (+1) / 0 |
| 15 | Sylvain Distin | Central Defender | 16-12-1977 | France | 38 | 4 | 5 | 0 | 0 | 2 (+1) / 0 |
| 16 | Noé Pamarot | Utility Defender | 14-04-1979 | France | 11 (4) | 1 (1) | 3 (1) | 0 | 0 | 1 (+2) / 1 |
| 23 | Sol Campbell (c) | Central Defender | 18-09-1974 | England | 32 | 3 | 4 | 0 | 0 | 1 (+1) / 0 |
| 30 | Armand Traoré | Left back/Left-sided Midfielder | 08-12-1989 | France | 14 (5) | 2 (1) | 6 | 0 | 2 (+2) | 0 / 0 |
| 35 | Marc Wilson | Utility Defender | 17-08-1987 | (Republic of Ireland) Ireland | 3 (1) | 2 (1) | 1 | 0 | 0 (+1) | 1 / 0 |
| 39 | Nadir Belhadj | Left back/Left-sided Midfielder | 18-06-1982 | Algeria | 21 (8) | 4 | 3 (2) | 2 | 3 (+3) | 2 (+3) / 1 |

==== Midfielders ====
| No. | Name | Position | Date of Birth | Nationality | League App. | Domestic Cups | UEFA Cup App. | Goals Scored | Assists | (yellow card) / (red card) |
| 6 | Hayden Mullins | Defensive midfielder/Sweeper/Right Back | 27-03-1979 | England | 15 (2) | 0 | 0 | 0 | 0 | 1 / 0 |
| 8 | Papa Bouba Diop | Defensive midfielder/Central Defender | 28-01-1978 | Senegal | 15 (1) | 0 | 3 (1) | 0 | 1 | 5 / 0 |
| 14 | Jermaine Pennant | Right-sided midfielder | 15-01-1983 | England | 9 (4) | 1 | 0 | 0 | 3 | 0 / 0 |
| 18 | Arnold Mvuemba | Central Midfielder/Right-sided Midfielder | 28-01-1985 | France | 1 (5) | 2 | 2 (2) | 0 (+1) | 0 | 0 / 0 |
| 19 | Niko Kranjčar | Attacking midfielder/Left-sided Midfielder | 13-08-1984 | Croatia | 16 (5) | 2 | 1 | 3 (+1) | 3 | 2 / 0 |
| 22 | Richard Hughes | Defensive midfielder | 25-06-1979 | Scotland | 17 (3) | 2 | 4 | 0 | 0 | 3 (+2) / 0 |
| 28 | Sean Davis | Defensive midfielder | 20-09-1979 | England | 31 (1) | 2 | 4 (2) | 1 | 3 (+1) | 5 / 1 |
| 33 | Angelos Basinas | Defensive midfielder | 03-01-1976 | Greece | 3 | 0 | 0 | 0 | 0 | 0 / 0 |

==== Forwards ====
| No. | Name | Position | Date of Birth | Nationality | League App. | Domestic Cups | UEFA Cup App. | Goals Scored | Assists | (yellow card) / (red card) |
| 9 | Peter Crouch | Centre forward | 30-01-1981 | England | 38 | 4 | 5 (1) | 13 (+5) | 5 | 2 / 0 |
| 10 | David Nugent | Centre forward | 02-05-1985 | England | 13 (3) | 3 | 0 | 3 | 1 | 1 / 0 |
| 17 | John Utaka | Right winger | 08-01-1982 | Nigeria | 4 (14) | 1 (1) | 1 | 1 | 1 | 1 / 0 |
| 27 | Nwankwo Kanu | Centre forward | 01-08-1976 | Nigeria | 3 (14) | 0 (3) | 2 (3) | 1 (+1) | 1 (+1) | 0 / 0 |

==== Others ====
Includes players who have yet to feature prominently and former players.

| No. | Name | Position | Date of Birth | Nationality | League App. | Domestic Cups | UEFA Cup App. | Goals Scored | Assists | (yellow card) / (red card) |
| 2 | Linvoy Primus | Central Defender | 14-09-1973 | England | 0 (1) | 0 | 0 | 0 | 0 | 0 / 0 |
| 4 | Lauren | Right back | 19-01-1977 | Cameroon | 0 | 0 | 0 | 0 | 0 | 0 / 0 |
| 6 | Lassana Diarra | Defensive midfielder | 10-03-1985 | France | 11 (1) | 0 | 2 | 0 (+1) | 0 | 3 / 1 |
| 11 | Jerome Thomas | Left-sided midfielder | 23-03-1983 | England | 0 (2) | 0 | 0 | 0 | 0 | 0 / 0 |
| 14 | Jermain Defoe | Centre forward | 07-10-1982 | England | 17 (2) | 0 | 4 | 7 (+2) | 4 (+1) | 4 (+1) / 0 |
| 20 | Martin Cranie | Utility Defender | 23-09-1986 | England | 0 | 2 | 0 | 0 | 0 | 0 / 0 |
| 24 | Richard Duffy | Right back | 30-08-1985 | Wales | 0 | 0 | 0 | 0 | 0 | 0 / 0 |
| 25 | Glen Little | Right-sided midfielder | 15-10-1975 | England | 4 (1) | 0 | 2 (1) | 0 | 0 (+1) | 0 / 0 |
| 26 | Pelé | Central Midfielder | 14-09-1987 | Portugal | 0 | 0 | 0 | 0 | 0 | 0 / 0 |
| 26 | Ben Sahar | Centre forward | 10-08-1989 | Israel | 0 | 0 | 0 | 0 | 0 | 0 / 0 |
| 29 | Theofanis Gekas | Centre forward | 23-05-1980 | Greece | 0 (1) | 0 | 0 | 0 | 0 | 0 / 0 |
| 29 | Jean-François Christophe | Defensive midfielder | 27-06-1987 | France | 0 | 0 | 0 | 0 | 0 | 0 / 0 |
| 32 | Djimi Traoré | Left back/Central Defender | 01-03-1980 | Mali | 0 | 0 | 0 | 0 | 0 | 0 / 0 |
| 36 | Matt Ritchie | Left-sided midfielder | 10-09-1989 | Scotland | 0 | 0 | 0 | 0 | 0 | 0 / 0 |

== Competitions ==
=== Community Shield ===
Portsmouth lost the 2008 FA Community Shield 3–1 on penalties against 2007–08 Premier League winners Manchester United after the match finished 0–0 after 90 minutes on 10 August. It was Pompey's second game against United in the space of two weeks.

| 10 August 2008 | Manchester United | 0–0 (3–1 p) | Portsmouth | Wembley Stadium, London |
| 15:00 BST | | Report | | Attendance: 84,808; Referee: Peter Walton (Northamptonshire)^{[A]} |
| | Penalties |
| | Tevez (penalty scored); Giggs (penalty scored); Carrick (penalty scored) | | (penalty missed) Diarra; (penalty scored) Defoe; (penalty missed) Mvuemba; (penalty missed) Johnson |

=== Premier League ===
| Matchday | 1 | 2 | 3 | 4 | 5 | 6 | 7 | 8 | 9 | 10 | 11 | 12 | 13 | 14 | 15 | 16 | 17 | 18 | 19 | 20 | 21 | 22 | 23 | 24 | 25 | 26 | 27 | 28 | 29 | 30 | 31 | 32 | 33 | 34 | 35 | 36 | 37 | 38 |
|---|---|---|---|---|---|---|---|---|---|---|---|---|---|---|---|---|---|---|---|---|---|---|---|---|---|---|---|---|---|---|---|---|---|---|---|---|---|---|
| Ground | A | H | A | H | A | H | H | A | H | A | H | A | A | H | H | A | H | A | H | A | A | H | A | H | H | A | H | A | H | A | H | H | A | A | H | A | H | A |
| Result | L | L | W | W | L | W | W | D | D | L | L | W | D | D | W | D | L | L | L | L | D | L | L | L | W | D | L | D | W | D | D | W | L | D | L | L | W | L |
| Position | 20 | 20 | 15 | 10 | 14 | 10 | 8 | 7 | 7 | 7 | 9 | 9 | 9 | 8 | 8 | 7 | 8 | 10 | 11 | 12 | 13 | 16 | 17 | 17 | 17 | 16 | 18 | 17 | 15 | 15 | 16 | 14 | 14 | 14 | 14 | 15 | 14 | 14 |

Source: WorldFootball.com
A = Away; H = Home; W = Win; D = Draw; L = Loss

==== Matches ====
| 17 August 2008 1 | Chelsea | 4–0 | Portsmouth | London |
| 13:30 | J. Cole 12'; Anelka 26'; Lampard 45' (pen.); Deco 89' | Report | James (yellow card) 45+1' | Stadium: Stamford Bridge; Attendance: 41,468; Referee: Mike Dean |

| 25 August 2008 2 | Portsmouth | 0–1 | Manchester United | Portsmouth |
| | | Report | Fletcher 32' | Stadium: Fratton Park; Attendance: 20,540; Referee: Chris Foy |

| 30 August 2008 3 | Everton | 0–3 | Portsmouth | Liverpool |
| 15:00 | Baines (yellow card) 88' | Report | Defoe 12', 69'; Johnson 40' | Stadium: Goodison Park; Attendance: 34,418; Referee: Mark Halsey |

| 13 September 2008 4 | Portsmouth | 2–1 | Middlesbrough | Portsmouth |
| | Defoe 59', 86' | Report | Mido 24' | Stadium: Fratton Park; Attendance: 19,425 |

| 21 September 2008 5 | Manchester City | 6–0 | Portsmouth | Manchester |
| | Jô 14'; Dunne 20'; Robinho 57'; Wright-Phillips 59'; Evans 78'; Fernandes 83' | Report | | Stadium: City of Manchester Stadium; Attendance: 40,238; Referee: Alan Wiley |

| 28 September 2008 6 | Portsmouth | 2–0 | Tottenham Hotspur | Portsmouth |
| | Defoe 34' (pen.); Crouch 68' | Report | | Stadium: Fratton Park; Attendance: 20,352 |

| 5 October 2008 7 | Portsmouth | 2–1 | Stoke City | Portsmouth |
| | Crouch 25'; Defoe 51' | Report | Fuller 48' | Stadium: Fratton Park; Attendance: 19,248 |

| 18 October 2008 8 | Aston Villa | 0–0 | Portsmouth | Birmingham |
| | | Report | | Stadium: Villa Park; Attendance: 37,660 |

| 26 October 2008 9 | Portsmouth | 1–1 | Fulham | Portsmouth |
| | Crouch 61' | Report | Dempsey 87' | Stadium: Fratton Park; Attendance: 19,233 |

| 29 October 2008 10 | Liverpool | 1–0 | Portsmouth | Anfield, Liverpool |
| | Gerrard 76' (pen.) | Report | | Stadium: Anfield; Attendance: 43,378 |

| 1 November 2008 11 | Portsmouth | 1–2 | Wigan Athletic | Portsmouth |
| | Kranjčar 82' | Report | Zaki 45' (pen.); Heskey 90' | Stadium: Fratton Park; Attendance: 18,416 |

| 8 November 2008 12 | Sunderland | 1–2 | Portsmouth | Sunderland |
| | Cissé 4' | Report | Belhadj 51'; Defoe 89' (pen.) | Stadium: Stadium of Light; Attendance: 37,712 |

| 15 November 2008 13 | West Ham United | 0–0 | Portsmouth | Upton Park, London |
| | | Report | | Stadium: Boleyn Ground; Attendance: 32,328 |

| 22 November 2008 14 | Portsmouth | 2–2 | Hull City | Portsmouth |
| | Crouch 20'; Johnson 63' | Report | Turner 54'; Windass 89' | Stadium: Fratton Park; Attendance: 20,240 |

| 30 November 2008 15 | Portsmouth | 3–2 | Blackburn Rovers | Portsmouth |
| | Crouch 49'; Defoe 53'; Davis 79' | Report | Derbyshire 62'; Kerimoğlu 67' | Stadium: Fratton Park; Attendance: 18,111 |

| 7 December 2008 16 | West Bromwich Albion | 1–1 | Portsmouth | West Bromwich |
| | Greening 39' | Report | Crouch 58' | Stadium: The Hawthorns; Attendance: 24,964 |

| 14 December 2008 17 | Portsmouth | 0–3 | Newcastle United | Portsmouth |
| | | Report | Owen 52'; Martins 77'; Guthrie 89' | Stadium: Fratton Park; Attendance: 19,416 |

| 20 December 2008 18 | Bolton Wanderers | 2–1 | Portsmouth | Bolton |
| | Taylor 1'; Gardner 3' | Report | Crouch 20' | Stadium: University of Bolton Stadium; Attendance: 19,884 |

| 26 December 2008 19 | Portsmouth | 1–4 | West Ham United | Portsmouth |
| 13:00 | Belhadj 8' | Report | Collison 20'; C. Cole 67'; Bellamy 70', 83' | Stadium: Fratton Park; Attendance: 20,102; Referee: Steve Bennett |

| 28 December 2008 20 | Arsenal | 1–0 | Portsmouth | Holloway, London |
| | Gallas 81' | Report | | Stadium: Emirates Stadium; Attendance: 60,092; Referee: Alan Wiley |

| 18 January 2009 21 | Tottenham Hotspur | 1–1 | Portsmouth | Tottenham, London |
| | Defoe 70' | Report | Nugent 59' | Stadium: White Hart Lane; Attendance: 36,011; Referee: Steve Bennett |

| 27 January 2009 22 | Portsmouth | 0–1 | Aston Villa | Portsmouth |
| | | Report | Heskey 21' | Stadium: Fratton Park; Attendance: 19,073 |

| 31 January 2009 23 | Fulham | 3–1 | Portsmouth | Fulham, London |
| | A. Johnson 14'; Nevland 71', 80' | Report | Nugent 84' | Stadium: Craven Cottage; Attendance: 23,722 |

| 7 February 2009 24 | Portsmouth | 2–3 | Liverpool | Portsmouth |
| 17:30 | Nugent 62'; Hreiðarsson 77' | Report | Aurélio 69'; Kuyt 85'; Torres 90' | Stadium: Fratton Park; Attendance: 20,524 |

| 14 February 2009 25 | Portsmouth | 2–0 | Manchester City | Portsmouth |
| | Johnson 70'; Hreiðarsson 75' | Report | | Stadium: Fratton Park; Attendance: 20,018 |

| 21 February 2009 26 | Stoke City | 2–2 | Portsmouth | Stoke-on-Trent |
| | Beattie 78' (pen.), 80' | Report | Kranjčar 75'; Shawcross 90' (o.g.) | Stadium: Britannia Stadium |

| 3 March 2009 27 | Portsmouth | 0–1 | Chelsea | Portsmouth |
| | | Report | Drogba 79' | Stadium: Fratton Park; Attendance: 20,326 |

| 14 March 2009 28 | Middlesbrough | 1–1 | Portsmouth | Middlesbrough |
| | King 90' | Report | Crouch 30' | Stadium: Riverside Stadium; Attendance: 24,281; Referee: Martin Atkinson |

| 21 March 2009 29 | Portsmouth | 2–1 | Everton | Portsmouth |
| | Crouch 22', 75' | Report | Baines 4' | Stadium: Fratton Park; Attendance: 20,388; Referee: Peter Walton |

| 4 April 2009 30 | Hull City | 0–0 | Portsmouth | Kingston upon Hull |
| | | Report | | Stadium: KC Stadium; Attendance: 24,802; Referee: Chris Foy |

| 11 April 2009 31 | Portsmouth | 2–2 | West Bromwich Albion | Portsmouth |
| | Kaboul 33'; Kranjčar 65' | Report | Greening 48'; Brunt 62' | Stadium: Fratton Park; Attendance: 20,376; Referee: Mike Dean |

| 18 April 2009 32 | Portsmouth | 1–0 | Bolton Wanderers | Portsmouth |
| | Kanu 78' | Report | | Stadium: Fratton Park; Attendance: 20,158; Referee: Phil Dowd |

| 22 April 2009 33 | Manchester United | 2–0 | Portsmouth | Stretford, Manchester |
| | Rooney 9'; Carrick 82' | Report | | Stadium: Old Trafford; Attendance: 74,895; Referee: Peter Walton |

| 27 April 2009 34 | Newcastle United | 0–0 | Portsmouth | Newcastle upon Tyne |
| | | Report | | Stadium: St James' Park; Attendance: 47,481; Referee: Mike Riley |

| 2 May 2009 35 | Portsmouth | 0–3 | Arsenal | Portsmouth |
| | | Report | Bendtner 13', 41' (pen.); Vela 56' | Stadium: Fratton Park; Attendance: 20,418; Referee: Lee Mason |

| 9 May 2009 36 | Blackburn Rovers | 2–0 | Portsmouth | Blackburn |
| | Pedersen 31'; McCarthy 58' (pen.) | Report | | Stadium: Ewood Park; Attendance: 24,234; Referee: Mike Riley |

| 18 May 2009 37 | Portsmouth | 3–1 | Sunderland | Portsmouth |
| | Utaka 60'; Bardsley 68' (o.g.); Traoré 88' | Report | Jones 59' | Stadium: Fratton Park; Attendance: 20,398; Referee: Alan Wiley |

| 24 May 2009 38 | Wigan Athletic | 1–0 | Portsmouth | Wigan |
| | Rodallega 26' | Report | | Stadium: JJB Stadium; Attendance: 17,696; Referee: Phil Dowd |

==== Final league table ====
| Pos | Team | Pld | W | D | L | GF | GA | GD | Pts |
|---|---|---|---|---|---|---|---|---|---|
| 12 | Stoke City | 38 | 12 | 9 | 17 | 38 | 55 | −17 | 45 |
| 13 | Bolton Wanderers | 38 | 11 | 8 | 19 | 41 | 53 | −12 | 41 |
| 14 | Portsmouth | 38 | 10 | 11 | 17 | 38 | 57 | −19 | 41 |
| 15 | Blackburn Rovers | 38 | 10 | 11 | 17 | 40 | 60 | −20 | 41 |
| 16 | Sunderland | 38 | 9 | 9 | 20 | 34 | 54 | −20 | 36 |

Source: Barclays Premier League
Rules for classification: 1) points; 2) goal difference; 3) number of goals scored.

==== Results summary ====
| Overall | | | | | | | | Home | | | | | | Away | | | | | |
| Pld | W | D | L | GF | GA | GD | Pts | W | D | L | GF | GA | GD | W | D | L | GF | GA | GD |
|---|---|---|---|---|---|---|---|---|---|---|---|---|---|---|---|---|---|---|---|
| 38 | 10 | 11 | 17 | 38 | 57 | −19 | 41 | 8 | 3 | 8 | 26 | 29 | −3 | 2 | 8 | 9 | 12 | 28 | −16 |

Source: Barclays Premier League

=== UEFA Cup ===
==== Group stage ====
| Team | Pld | W | D | L | GF | GA | GD | Pts |
|---|---|---|---|---|---|---|---|---|
| (Germany) Wolfsburg | 4 | 3 | 1 | 0 | 13 | 7 | +6 | 10 |
| (Italy) Milan | 4 | 2 | 2 | 0 | 8 | 5 | +3 | 8 |
| (Portugal) Braga | 4 | 2 | 0 | 2 | 7 | 5 | +2 | 6 |
| (England) Portsmouth | 4 | 1 | 1 | 2 | 7 | 8 | −1 | 4 |
| (Netherlands) Heerenveen | 4 | 0 | 0 | 4 | 3 | 13 | −10 | 0 |

Source: RSSSF

===== Matches =====
| 23 October 2008 | Braga (Portugal) | 3–0 | (England) Portsmouth | Braga, Portugal |
| 20:15 UTC+1 | Aguiar 8'; Rentería 46'; Alan 87' | Report | | Stadium: Estádio AXA, Braga; Attendance: 12,000; Referee: Darko Ceferin (Slovenia) |

| 27 November 2008 | Portsmouth (England) | 2–2 | (Italy) Milan | Fratton Park, Portsmouth |
| 20:05 UTC+0 | Kaboul 62'; Kanu 73' | Report | Ronaldinho 84'; Inzaghi 90+2' | Attendance: 20,403; Referee: Serge Gumienny (Belgium) |

| 4 December 2008 | Wolfsburg (Germany) | 3–2 | (England) Portsmouth | Volkswagen Arena, Wolfsburg |
| 20:45 UTC+1 | Džeko 3'; Gentner 23'; Misimović 74' | Report | Defoe 11'; Mvuemba 14' | Attendance: 21,015; Referee: Ivan Bebek (Croatia) |

| 17 December 2008 | Portsmouth (England) | 3–0 | (Netherlands) Heerenveen | Fratton Park, Portsmouth |
| 19:45 UTC+0 | Crouch 40', 42'; Hreiðarsson 90' | Report | | Attendance: 19,612; Referee: Richard Havrilla (Slovakia) |

== Top scorers ==
- (England) Jermain Defoe 7
- (Croatia) Niko Kranjčar 3
- (England) Glen Johnson 3
- (England) David Nugent 3
