= Younes Kaboul =

French footballer (born 1986)

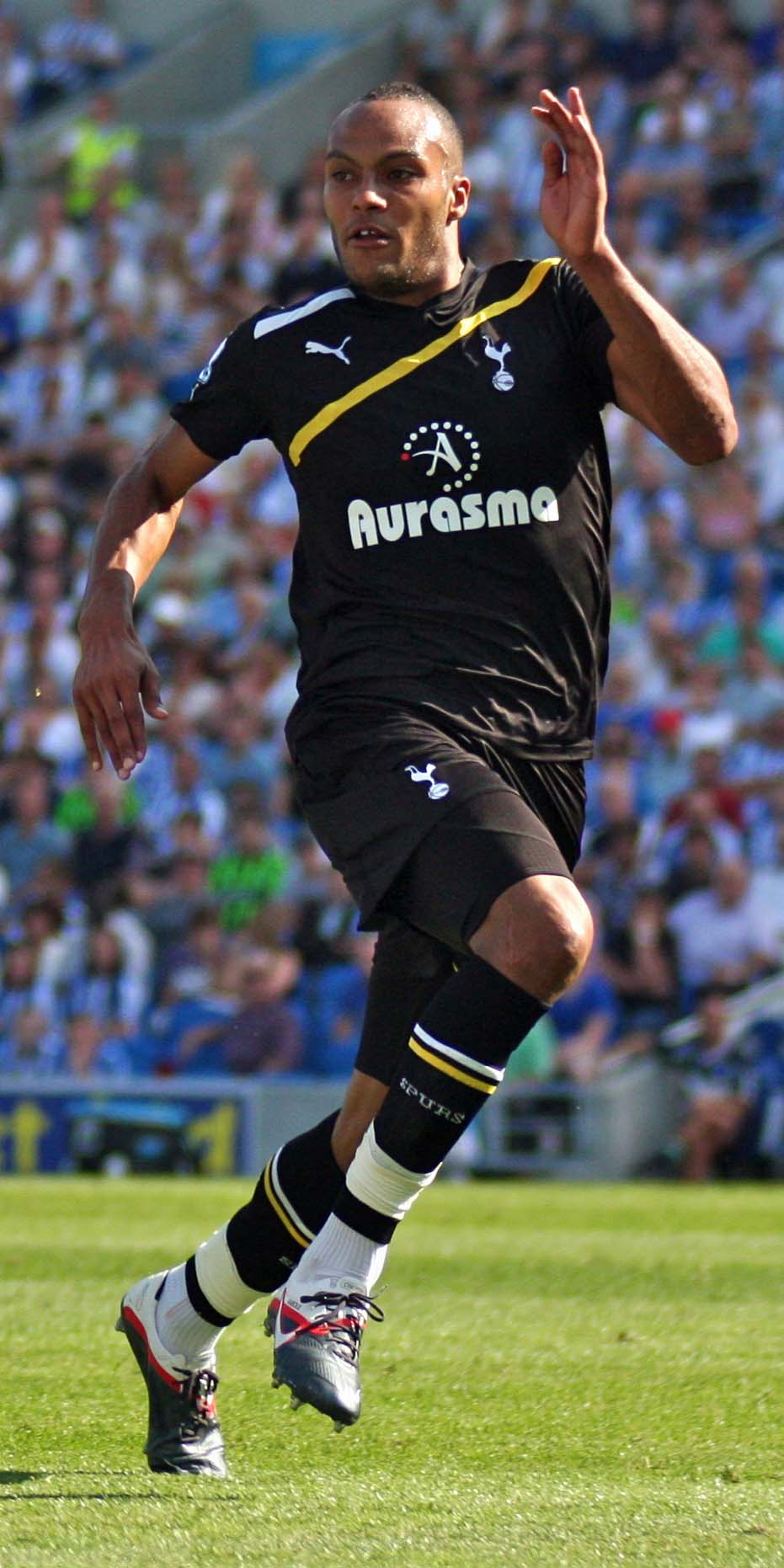
- Kaboul playing for Tottenham Hotspur in 2011

Personal information
- Full name: Younes Kaboul
- Date of birth: 4 January 1986 (age 40)
- Place of birth: Saint-Julien-en-Genevois, France
- Height: 1.93 m (6 ft 4 in)
- Position: Centre-back

Youth career
- 1991–1993: Bellegarde
- 1993–1999: Concordia
- 1999–2000: Oyonnax Plastics Vallée
- 2000–2004: Auxerre

Senior career*
Years	Team	Apps	(Gls)
2004–2007	Auxerre	52	(3)
2007–2008	Tottenham Hotspur	21	(3)
2008–2010	Portsmouth	39	(4)
2010–2015	Tottenham Hotspur	89	(3)
2015–2016	Sunderland	24	(0)
2016–2018	Watford	25	(2)
Total		248	(15)

International career
2006–2008	France U21	19	(1)
2011	France	5	(1)
- * Club domestic league appearances and goals

Younes Kaboul (born 4 January 1986) is a French former professional footballer who played as a centre-back for Auxerre, Tottenham Hotspur, Portsmouth, Sunderland and Watford. For France, Kaboul played for the under-21 team and went on to play five matches and scored one goal for the senior national team in 2011.

Kaboul began his professional career with Auxerre in 2004. After an estimated £8 million move to Tottenham Hotspur in 2007, he spent eleven years in England's Premier League. He won the League Cup with Tottenham in 2008.

== Club career ==
=== Auxerre ===
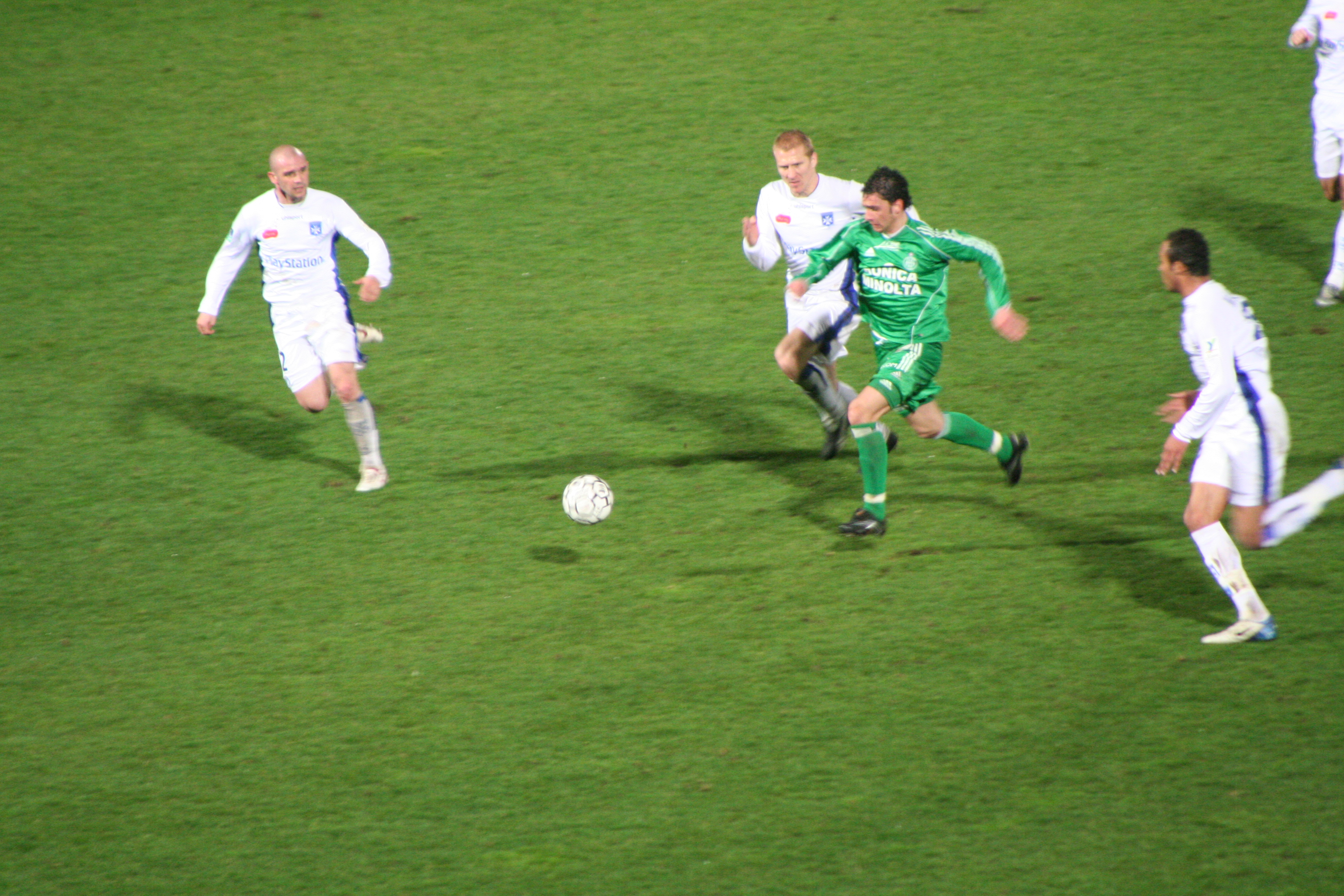
Kaboul (right) playing for Auxerre in 2006

Born in Saint-Julien-en-Genevois, Haute-Savoie, Kaboul began his career at Bellegarde, Concordia and Plastics Vallée. He then joined Auxerre, where the player started his professional career.

Kaboul appeared as an unused substitute against PSV in the second leg of the UEFA Cup, as the club lost 3–0 on 25 March 2004, resulting in their elimination from the tournament. He broke into the first team in the 2004–05 season and made his debut for Auxerre, playing the whole game, in a 2–1 win against Toulouse on 3 October. Three weeks later, on 21 October, Kaboul made his debut European debut, playing the whole game, in a 0–0 against Grazer AK. The 2004–05 season saw Kaboul make 15 appearances in all competitions for Auxerre and helped the club win the Coupe de France in 2005, as well as having European football experience in the UEFA Cup. With his playing time reduced for most of the 2005–06 season, Kaboul's playing time increased in mid March and he went on to make nine appearances in all competitions.

At the start of the 2006–07 season, Kaboul started the season well when he played both legs against Farul Constanța in the third round of the UEFA Intertoto Cup to help Auxerre win 4–2 on aggregate. Kaboul then became a first-team regular for the club, playing at centre-back. In a match against Le Mans on 4 November 2006, however, he was sent off for a second bookable offence, in a 3–2 loss. After serving a one-match suspension, Kaboul returned to the first team against Toulouse on 19 November and helped Auxerre keep a clean sheet, in a 1–0 win. He then helped the club keep three consecutive clean sheets in three matches between 3 March 2007 and 18 March 2007. During this time, Kaboul scored his first goal for Auxerre, in a 1–0 win against Paris Saint-Germain on 11 March. Three weeks later, on 1 April, he scored his second goal for the club, in a 2–2 draw against Le Mans. Despite being sidelined with injuries during the 2006–07 season, he went on to make 40 appearances and score two goals in all competitions. During his time at Auxerre, Kaboul was known to be the "back bone" for the club due to his excellent tackling skills, good judgment and strength. He was also known to score a few key goals that clinched wins for the club.

=== Tottenham Hotspur ===
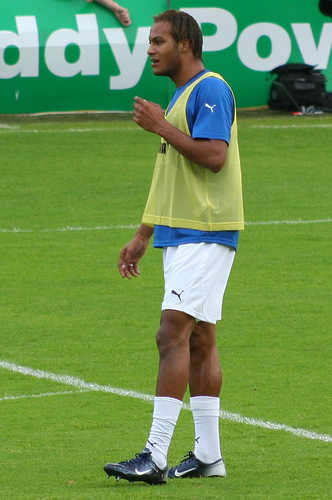
Kaboul training with Tottenham Hotspur in 2007

Kaboul signed for Tottenham Hotspur in the Premier League on 5 July 2007 for an undisclosed fee believed to be around £8 million. He quickly became a fan favourite, admired for his power and aggression on the pitch. He made his Premier League debut starting alongside Anthony Gardner at centre-back in a 1–0 loss against Sunderland on the first day of the 2007–08 season. In a following match against Everton, however, Kaboul suffered a hamstring injury and was substituted in the 18th minute, as Tottenham lost 3–1. After missing two matches, he returned to the starting line-up against Fulham on 1 September and scored his first goal for the club, in a 3–3 draw. Kaboul scored again on his European debut for Tottenham, on 20 September, with the first goal in a 6–1 win over Anorthosis Famagusta. Two weeks later, on 1 October, on the club's 125th anniversary, Kaboul scored the equaliser late in stoppage time against Aston Villa to pull Tottenham level at 4–4 and complete a remarkable comeback from 4–1 down. Since joining Tottenham, he rotated in the centre-back position with other defenders. However, Kaboul produced numerous errors that saw him out of the team on three separate occasions after the appointment of Juande Ramos. Kaboul came on as a 102nd-minute substitute for Robbie Keane as Tottenham beat Chelsea 2–1 in the 2008 Football League Cup Final at Wembley Stadium on 24 February 2008. However, his return was short-lived as he suffered a knee injury and never played for the club for the rest of the season. In April, Kaboul criticised Ramos for not giving him a chance to play in the first team. He made 29 appearances for Tottenham in his first season at the club, scoring four goals.

Ahead of the 2008–09 season, Kaboul said that he wanted to stay at Tottenham and fight for his place in the first team. It came after Ramos was keen on selling him. Kaboul was linked with a move to Juventus, Portsmouth, Hamburg, Aston Villa, Sunderland and Newcastle United. By June, he announced his intention to leave the club for the sake of his career.

=== Portsmouth ===
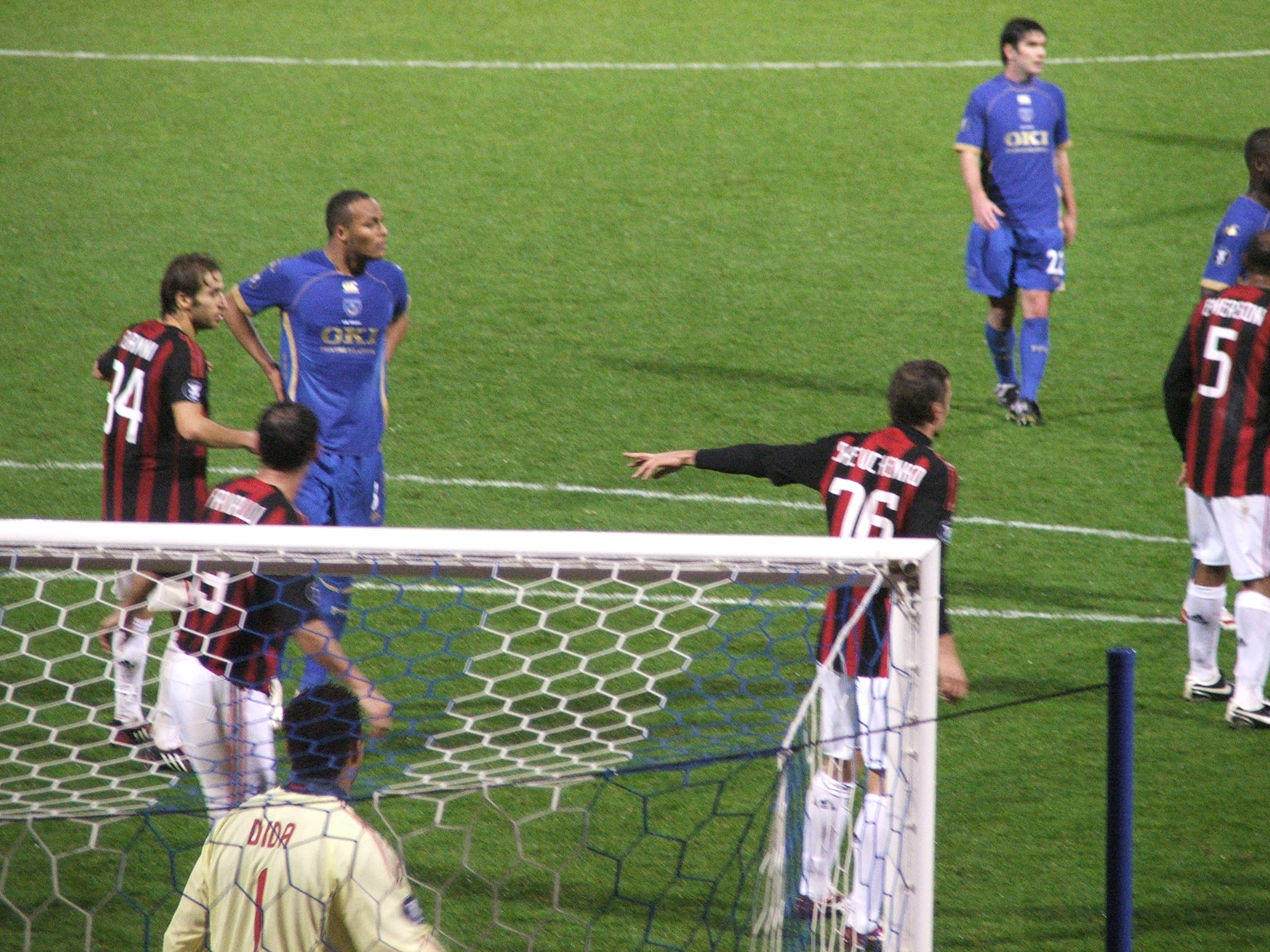
Kaboul (furthest left in blue) playing for Portsmouth in 2008

On 11 August 2008, Kaboul signed for Portsmouth on a four-year contract for an undisclosed fee believed to be around £6 million. He made his debut in the opening game of the season against Chelsea and played the whole game, as the club lost 4–0. Since joining Portsmouth, Kaboul found himself in and out of the starting line-up, fighting for his place at centre-back. In a match against Hull City on 22 November, he set up the team's first goal, in a 2–2 draw. Five days later, on 27 November, Kaboul scored his first goal for Portsmouth, in a 2–2 draw against AC Milan in the UEFA Cup. His first league goal came on 12 April 2009 with a left-footed strike into the top corner at home against West Bromwich Albion. Despite suffering injuries throughout the 2008–09 season, Kaboul went on to make 25 appearances and score two goals in all competitions.

At the start of the 2009–10 season, Kaboul continued to establish himself in the first team, playing at right-back and centre-back. He scored from a header in a 4–1 loss to Arsenal on 22 August 2009. He helped Portsmouth keep three clean sheets between 24 October and 31 October. After missing a month through suspension, Kaboul scored on his return, but was sent off for a second bookable offence in the last minute of the game, in a 1–1 draw on 12 December. In the January transfer window, he was linked a move away from the club. Amid the transfer speculation, Kaboul was left out of the Portsmouth team. However, he returned to the starting line-up against Sunderland in the fourth round of the FA Cup on 23 January 2010 and set up a goal for John Utaka, who scored twice, in a 2–1 to advance to the next round. Three days later, on 26 January, Kaboul made his last appearance for Portsmouth, coming against West Ham United and helped the club earn a point, in a 1–1 draw. In total, Kaboul made 50 appearances for Portsmouth, scoring five goals.

=== Return to Tottenham Hotspur ===
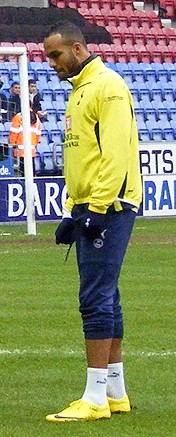
Kaboul training with Tottenham Hotspur in 2010

On 30 January 2010, Tottenham Hotspur announced that Kaboul would be rejoining the club for an undisclosed fee, reported to be £9.5 million. Portsmouth would receive just £6.5 million of this owing to instalments outstanding on the earlier transfer and to a sell-on clause. Tottenham manager Harry Redknapp stated that Kaboul was "much improved" from his first spell at the club, and that he was a "late developer". He made his second debut, playing the whole game at right-back, in a 1–0 loss against Wolverhampton Wanderers on 10 February. Since joining Tottenham, Kaboul found himself in and out of the starting line-up rotating in playing in defensive midfield, centre-back and right-back. On 5 May, Kaboul was in the starting line-up against Manchester City at right-back and was instrumental in the goal that brought Tottenham a 1–0 victory, whipping in a cross that the City goalkeeper could only palm into the path of Tottenham striker Peter Crouch. This victory guaranteed them fourth place in the 2009–10 Premier League and passage into the UEFA Champions League qualifiers for the first time in the club's history. Kaboul made 10 appearances in all competitions for Tottenham in the 2009–10 season.

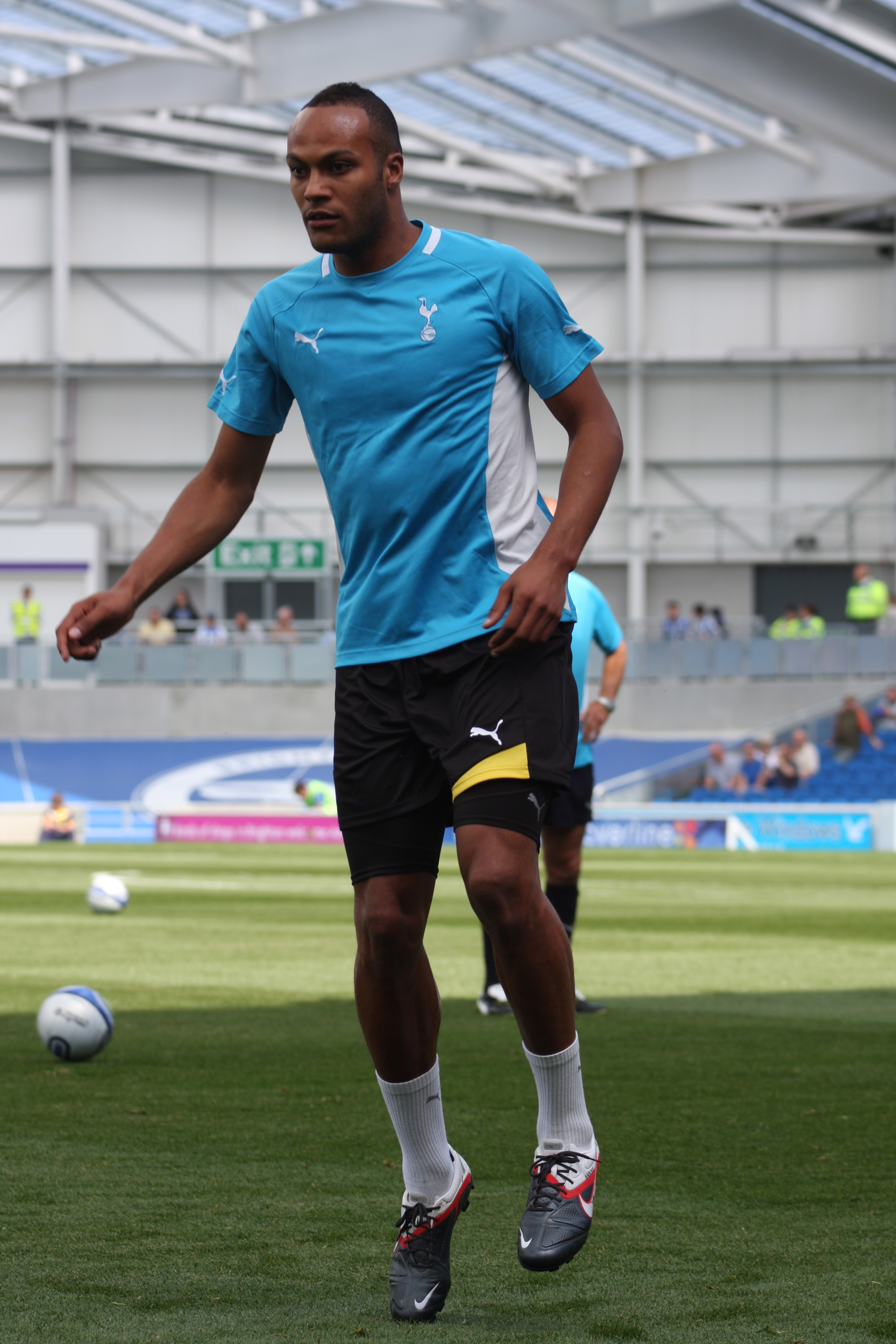
Kaboul training with Tottenham Hotspur in 2011

At the start of the 2010–11 season, Kaboul made four starts for Tottenham, playing at right-back and centre-back. He made his UEFA Champions League debut against Werder Bremen and played the whole game, as the club drew 2–2 on 14 September 2010. During a 3–1 win against Wolverhampton Wanderers on 18 September, Kaboul suffered a hamstring injury and was substituted at half time, which sidelined him for weeks. It was not until 23 October when Kaboul returned to the starting line-up against Everton at centre-back and helped Tottenham draw 1–1. He then scored the winner in the North London derby against Arsenal in a match which Tottenham were losing 2–0 at half-time, and continued his scoring form after volleying home the first goal in a 3–0 victory against Werder Bremen in the Champions League. However, during a 2–1 win against Liverpool on 28 November, Kaboul suffered a hip injury in the 36th minute and was substituted as a result. After the match, it was announced that he would be out for two weeks after having a scan. Kaboul made his return to the first team against Aston Villa on 26 December and helped the team win 2–1. In the following match against Newcastle on 28 December, he set up a goal for Aaron Lennon but was sent off in the 65th minute for a second bookable offence, in a 2–0 win. After serving a three-match suspension, his return was short-lived as Kaboul suffered a knee injury that eventually saw him out for three months. He returned on 9 April 2011 when starting against Stoke City, helping Tottenham win 3–2. Following this, Kaboul regained his first-team place, playing at right-back, as the club finished in fifth place in the league. He went on to make 24 appearances and score two goals in all competitions in the 2010–11 season.

Ahead of the 2011–12 season, Kaboul was linked a transfer to Ligue 1 club Paris Saint-Germain although this never materialised. At the start of the 2011–12 season, he continued to establish himself in the first team, playing at centre-back. Kaboul scored his first goal of the season on 28 August 2011, with a header in a 5–1 loss against Manchester City. Kaboul captained Tottenham for the first time on 20 September against Stoke City in the third round of the League Cup, as he played 120 minutes in a 0–0 draw and saw Tottenham lost 7–6 on penalties. In November, Juventus rekindled their interest in signing Kaboul, but the player said he was happy to stay at Tottenham. Following this, Kaboul was sent off for a second bookable offence on 11 December in a 2–1 loss against Stoke. Four days later, on 15 December, he captained Tottenham for the second time this season against Shamrock Rovers in the UEFA Europa League match and helped the team keep a clean sheet, in a 4–0 win. After serving a one-match suspension, Kaboul returned to the starting line-up against Norwich City on 27 December and helped Tottenham win 2–0. However, Kaboul suffered a knee injury that saw him miss two matches. It was not until on 26 February 2012 when he made his return to the starting line-up against rivals Arsenal and played the whole game, as Tottenham lost 5–2. Following this, Kaboul regained his first-team place, playing at centre-back for the rest of the 2011–12 season and helped the club finish in fourth place in the league. He went on to make 41 appearances and score on goal in all competitions in the 2011–12 season.

In the opening game of the 2012–13 season, Kaboul made his first appearance of the season, playing the whole game, in a 2–1 loss against Newcastle United, in what turned out to be his only appearance of the season. He suffered a knee injury which required surgery and was sidelined for four months. While on the sidelines, Kaboul was linked with a move to Russian Premier League side Anzhi Makhachkala but Tottenham refused to sell him. He returned on 8 April 2013 when playing in a reserve match against West Ham United Reserves, playing 60 minutes before being substituted, in a 1–1 draw. He made another appearance against Manchester United Reserves on 15 April, starting a match and played 48 minutes before being substituted, in a 1–0 loss. It was later revealed that Kaboul had suffered a thigh injury and was sidelined for the rest of the 2012–13 season.

Ahead of the 2013–14 season, Kaboul recovered from injury and participated in the club's pre-season tour. He made his first league appearance in almost a year, coming on as an 86th-minute substitute on 18 August 2013 in a 1–0 win against Crystal Palace. Kaboul played in both legs as captain against Dinamo Tbilisi in the UEFA Europa League play-off round, as Tottenham won 8–0 on aggregate. However, he found himself out of the starting line-up for the next two months in the club's league matches, due to competitions, as well as, his own injury concern. Kaboul returned to the starting line-up against Hull on 30 October in the last 16 of the League Cup and played 120 minutes, resulting in a penalty shoot-out following a 2–2 draw and he scored the seventh penalty, as the club won 8–7 in the shoot-out to advance to the next round. However, Kaboul suffered a hip injury that saw him out for a month. He returned to training in January before making his return to the first team against Newcastle on 12 February 2014 in a 4–0 win. However, Kaboul's return was short-lived as he suffered a calf muscle strain that saw him out throughout February. He returned to the starting line-up against Chelsea on 8 March, but was sent off in the 59th minute as the team lost 4–0. After the match, Tottenham successfully appealed his suspension. Following this, Kaboul regained his first-team place, as well as being captain, for the next six matches. He also scored his first goal for the club – his first goal in two years – in a 3–1 win against Fulham on 19 April. However, Kaboul was sent off for a straight red card in the 25th minute, as Tottenham lost 2–0 against West Ham on 3 May. He went on to make 20 appearances and scored one goal in all competitions in the 2013–14 season.

Ahead of the 2014–15 season, Kaboul was linked with a move away from Tottenham, as clubs, such as Beşiktaş, West Ham and even rivals Arsenal, were interested in signing him. At the start of the 2014–15 season, he helped the club keep three clean sheets in the first four matches of the season. On 15 September 2014, manager Mauricio Pochettino appointed Kaboul as Tottenham's permanent club captain, after predecessor Michael Dawson moved to Hull. Since the start of the 2014–15 season, he continued to establish himself in the first team, playing at centre-back. However, by mid November, Kaboul had been dropped from the first-team squad by Pochettino and the captaincy was given to Hugo Lloris and Harry Kane. It came after when he was booed by the club's supporters following a 2–1 loss against Stoke on 9 November. As a result, Kaboul appeared three more times for Tottenham as the season progressed. He went on to make 15 appearances in all competitions in the 2014–15 season. Following this, local newspaper Tottenham Independent expected Kaboul to leave the club in the summer transfer window.

=== Sunderland ===
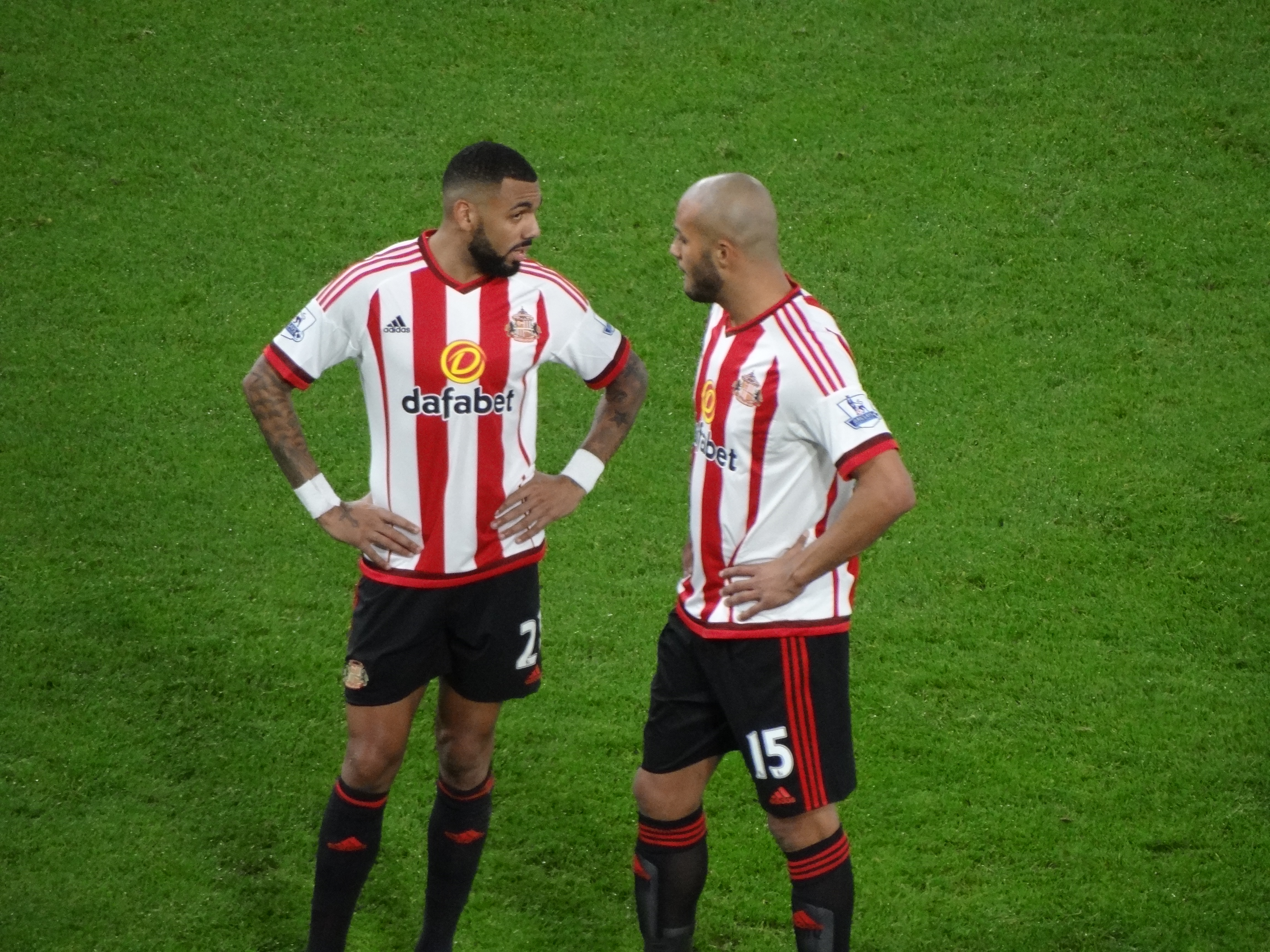
Kaboul (right) playing for Sunderland in 2015

On 16 July 2015, Kaboul signed for Sunderland on a four-year contract for an undisclosed fee. He was previously linked with a move to Roma, Beşiktaş and West Ham, who both rekindled their interest in signing the player, before making his move to Sunderland. Kaboul made his Sunderland debut on 8 August, playing the entirety of a 4–2 defeat away to Leicester City in the opening game of the season. On 19 September, Kaboul was sent off for two bookable offences in his first match as the club's captain, a 2–0 defeat away to AFC Bournemouth. After the match, the Daily Mirror called him "the most ill-disciplined Premier League player ever". Kaboul struggled for form and fitness under Dick Advocaat at the start of the season. He was further sidelined when he suffered injuries that eventually kept him out for three months. It was not until 1 March 2016 that Kaboul returned to the first team, coming on as a 28th-minute substitute for John O'Shea in a 2–2 draw against Crystal Palace. Following this, new manager Sam Allardyce paired Kaboul with new defensive signing Lamine Koné in the latter stages of the season, including keeping two clean sheets. The pair formed an effective partnership as Sunderland improved defensively, culminating in a man of the match performance from Kaboul in a 3–0 victory over Everton on 11 May that secured the club's Premier League survival and left Kaboul in tears during post-match celebrations. He went on to make 23 appearances in all competitions in the 2015–16 season.

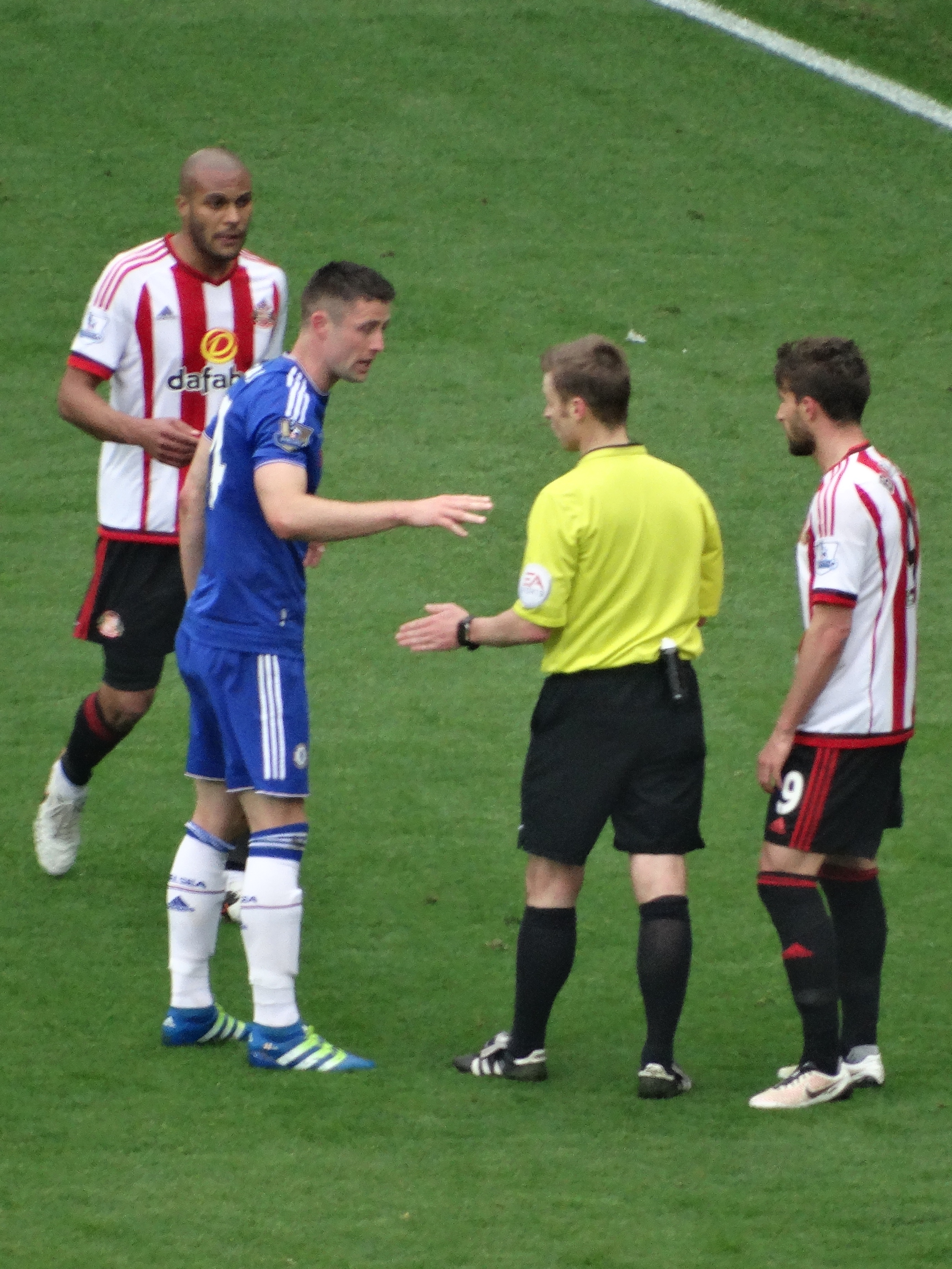
Kaboul (left) playing for Sunderland in 2016

Kaboul made his only Sunderland appearance of the 2016–17 season in the opening game of the season, a 2–1 defeat to Manchester City. However, he wanted to leave Sunderland to return to the London area for personal reasons, and the club accepted a bid from Watford.

=== Watford ===
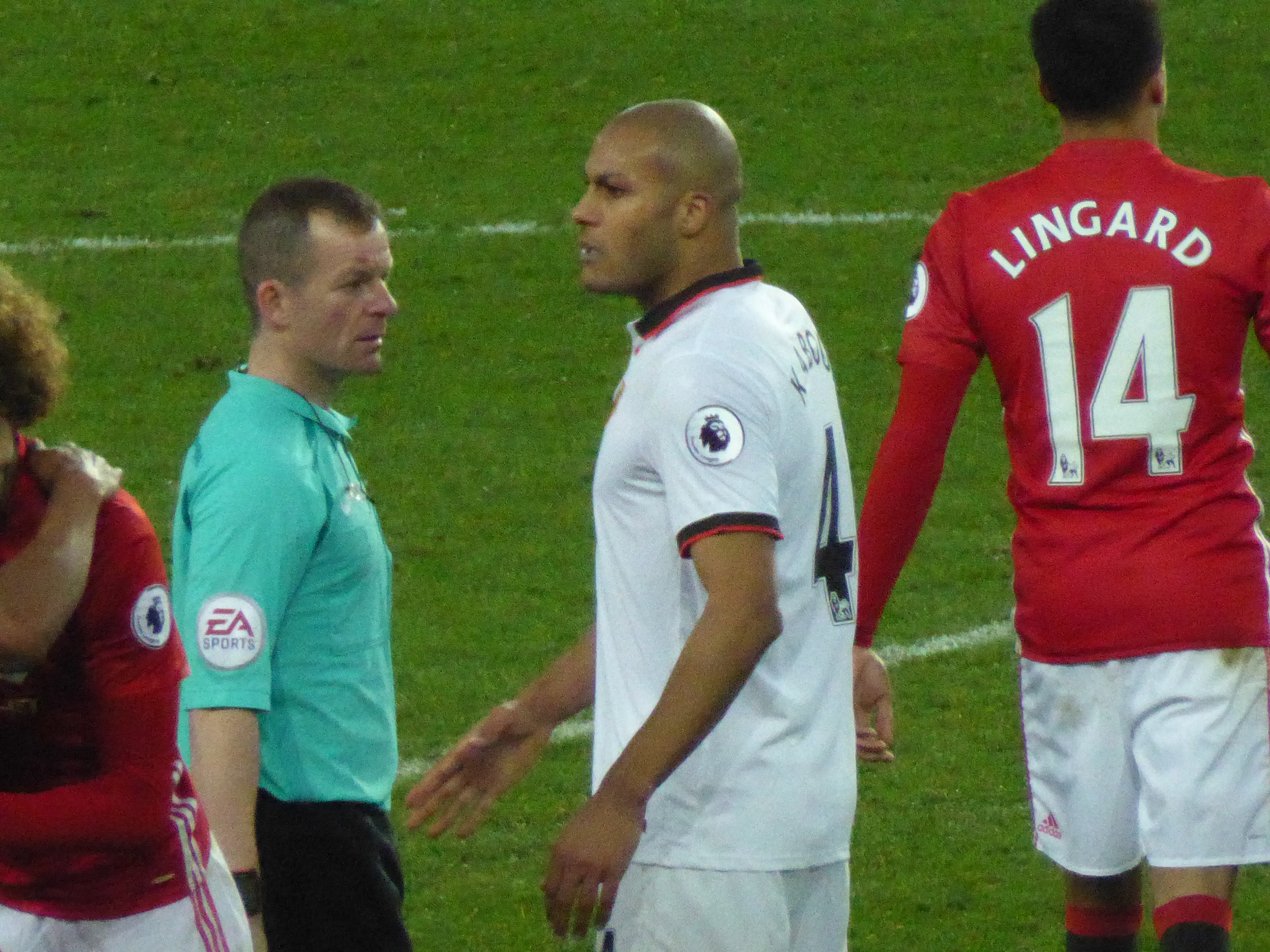
Kaboul (in white) playing for Watford in 2017

On 19 August 2016, Kaboul joined Watford on a three-year contract for a fee in the region of £4 million. He made his debut on 27 August, playing the whole game in a 3–1 loss against Arsenal. However, Kaboul was sidelined throughout September with an injury. He returned to the team on 1 October, playing the whole game in a 2–2 draw against Bournemouth. This was followed up by helping Watford keep a clean sheet in the next three matches. However, during a 1–0 loss against Stoke on 27 November, Kaboul suffered an injury and was substituted in the 21st minute. After the match, manager Walter Mazzarri said that Kaboul would be out for weeks. He made his return to the starting line-up against his former club Sunderland on 17 December and played 78 minutes before being substituted, in a 1–0 loss. Two weeks later, on 1 January 2017, Kaboul scored his first goal for Watford in the last minute of the game, losing 4–1 to his former club Tottenham. Since returning from injury, Kaboul regained his first-team place, playing at centre-back. However, during a 1–0 win against Sunderland on 1 April, he suffered a hamstring injury and was substituted in the 42nd minute. This ruled him out for the rest of the 2016–17 season. He went on to make 24 appearances and score one goal in all competitions in the 2016–17 season.

Ahead of the 2017–18 season, Kaboul remained on the sidelines with an injury throughout Watford's pre-season tour. he made his first league appearance in four months in the opening game of the season, playing the entirety of a 3–3 draw against Liverpool. However, his return was short-lived as he suffered a muscular problem that saw him sidelined throughout August 2017. Kaboul made his return to the first team on 9 September, starting in a win over Southampton. However, he suffered a hamstring injury during the match and was substituted in the 62nd minute, in what turned out to be the last appearance of his career. Eventually, Kaboul was sidelined for the rest of the year. Despite making a recovery in January, he was left out of Watford's 25-man Premier League squad and did not play for the club again in the 2017–18 season.

For the 2018–19 season, Kaboul was again left out of the club's 25-man Premier League squad. Manager Javi Gracia told Kaboul that he could leave Watford after being deemed surplus to requirements. Kaboul left the club by mutual consent on 21 December 2018, having not played since September 2017. After spending two years as a free agent, he said: "Right now I am taking a break from the professional side of the game and assessing my options. I think for me next is to get my badges and go into coaching. But right now I am taking some time to learn before I make that next step." Kaboul later retired from professional football.

== International career ==
Kaboul was eligible to play for France and Morocco, as he is of Moroccan descent through his parents. In October 2010, Kaboul turned down the chance to represent Morocco.

=== France U21 ===
In August 2006, Kaboul was called up to the France under-21 team for the first time. He made his debut against Belgium on 15 August, playing the whole game in a 1–0 loss. He captained France for the first time against Romania on 1 June 2007 in a 1–1 draw. Kaboul had captained France on four occasions by the end of the year.

In May 2008, Kaboul was called up to the under-21 team for the first time in six months. He appeared twice for France during the same month. He helped France keep clean sheets in matches against Malta and Bosnia and Herzegovina. He scored his first goal for France on 10 October in a 1–1 draw against Germany. Kaboul went on to make 12 appearances and scoring one for the under-21 team.

=== France ===
After turning down Morocco, Kaboul was called up to the France senior team for the first time on 15 November 2010. However, he appeared as an unused substitute against England two days later. In May 2011, Kaboul was called up to France for the second time. He scored on his national team debut on 6 June, with a header from Marvin Martin's corner in a 4–1 friendly win away to Ukraine at the Donbas Arena. Kaboul later played five times for the senior team by the end of the year. On 15 May 2012, Kaboul was ruled out of a possible place at UEFA Euro 2012 after suffering a knee injury during Tottenham's final match of the 2011–12 season.

== Personal life ==
Growing up in the Rhône-Alpes region of eastern France close to the Swiss border, Kaboul has three sisters, with him being the only boy and the youngest in the family. He said: "My dad used to push me to play football. He played and I was into tennis. It was a choice between the two and tennis was too expensive, so I stopped."

Kaboul is a Muslim. In addition to speaking French, he speaks English. During his time at Tottenham, Kaboul had been involved in campaigning against racism in English football.

== Career statistics ==
=== Club ===
Appearances and goals by club, season and competition
Club	Season	League			National cup (Note: Includes Coupe de France, FA Cup)		League cup (Note: Includes Coupe de la Ligue, Football League Cup)		Continental		Total	
Club	Season	Division	Apps	Goals	Apps	Goals	Apps	Goals	Apps	Goals	Apps	Goals
Auxerre	2004–05	Ligue 1	12	0	3	0	0	0	3 (Note: Appearances in UEFA Cup)	0	18	0
Auxerre	2005–06	Ligue 1	9	0	0	0	0	0	0	0	9	0
Auxerre	2006–07	Ligue 1	31	2	0	0	1	0	4	0	36	2
Auxerre	Total		52	2	3	0	1	0	7	0	63	2
Tottenham Hotspur	2007–08	Premier League	21	3	1	0	4	0	3	1	29	4
Portsmouth	2008–09	Premier League	20	1	0	0	3	0	2	1	25	2
Portsmouth	2009–10	Premier League	19	3	4	0	2	0	–		25	3
Portsmouth	Total		39	4	4	0	5	0	2	1	50	5
Tottenham Hotspur	2009–10	Premier League	10	0	–		–		–		10	0
Tottenham Hotspur	2010–11	Premier League	21	1	0	0	0	0	3 (Note: Appearances in UEFA Champions League)	1	24	2
Tottenham Hotspur	2011–12	Premier League	33	1	3	0	1	0	4 (Note: Appearances in UEFA Europa League)	0	41	1
Tottenham Hotspur	2012–13	Premier League	1	0	0	0	0	0	0	0	1	0
Tottenham Hotspur	2013–14	Premier League	13	1	0	0	1	0	6	1	20	2
Tottenham Hotspur	2014–15	Premier League	11	0	2	0	0	0	2	0	15	0
Tottenham Hotspur	Total		89	3	5	0	2	0	15	2	111	5
Sunderland	2015–16	Premier League	23	0	0	0	0	0	–		23	0
Sunderland	2016–17	Premier League	1	0	0	0	0	0	–		1	0
Sunderland	Total		24	0	0	0	0	0	–		24	0
Watford	2016–17	Premier League	23	2	2	0	0	0	–		25	2
Watford	2017–18	Premier League	2	0	0	0	0	0	–		2	0
Watford	2018–19	Premier League	0	0	0	0	0	0	–		0	0
Watford	Total		25	2	2	0	0	0	–		27	2
Career total			248	15	15	0	12	0	26	4	295	19

=== International ===
Appearances and goals by national team and year
National team	Year	Apps	Goals
France	2011	5	1
Total		5	1

France score listed first, score column indicates score after each Kaboul goal

List of international goals scored by Younes Kaboul
No.	Date	Venue	Opponent	Score	Result	Competition
1	6 June 2011	Donbas Arena, Donetsk, Ukraine	Ukraine	1–3	1–4	Friendly

== Honours ==
Auxerre

- Coupe de France: 2004–05

Tottenham Hotspur

- Football League Cup: 2007–08
