= Anthony Vanden Borre =

Belgian footballer (born 1987)

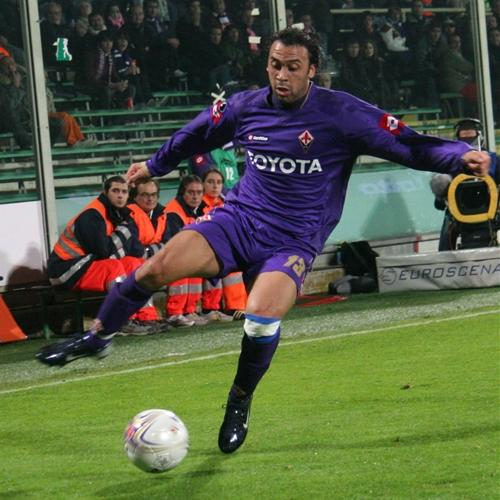
- Vanden Borre playing for Fiorentina in 2007

Personal information
- Full name: Anthony Henri Vanden Borre
- Date of birth: 24 October 1987 (age 39)
- Place of birth: Likasi, Zaire
- Height: 1.85 m (6 ft 1 in)
- Positions: Right-back; right winger

Youth career
- 1995–2003: Anderlecht

Senior career*
Years	Team	Apps	(Gls)
2003–2007	Anderlecht	68	(3)
2007–2008	Fiorentina	2	(0)
2008–2010	Genoa	31	(0)
2009–2010	→ Portsmouth (loan)	19	(0)
2010–2012	Genk	42	(1)
2013–2017	Anderlecht	48	(1)
2016–2017	→ Montpellier (loan)	10	(0)
2017	TP Mazembe	5	(0)
2020–2021	Anderlecht	0	(0)
Total		225	(5)

International career
2001–2003	Belgium U16	19	(5)
2003–2004	Belgium U17	12	(3)
2004–2008	Belgium U21	11	(3)
2004–2014	Belgium	28	(1)
- * Club domestic league appearances and goals

Anthony Henri Vanden Borre (born 24 October 1987) is a Belgian former professional footballer who played as a defender. He played for clubs in Belgium, Italy, England, France and the DR Congo. He had 28 caps for the Belgium national team. He is capable of playing as both a right-back and a right winger.

== Club career ==
=== Anderlecht ===
Vanden Borre was trained at Anderlecht throughout his entire youth career, at the same time as his friend Vincent Kompany. He made his debut in the regular competition when he was 16 years and 187 days old. At that time, only one other player, Paul Van Himst, was younger when he debuted. A month on, Vanden Borre signed a contract with Anderlecht until 2007. In 2005, he drew attention to himself in a Champions League game against Chelsea, when he had the best attempt on goal for Anderlecht as they lost 1–0 to the English champions, striking Chelsea goalkeeper Petr Čech's post around midway through the game. He finally scored his first official goal at home against K.S.V. Roeselare in a 5–1 win when he opened the scoring on 21 September 2005.

While both Kompany and Vanden Borre were considered huge football talents, Vanden Borre was considered to be an even greater star-in-the-making than Kompany. Anderlecht-icon Paul Van Himst called Vanden Borre "the biggest talent he has ever seen in his career". He was praised for his technical ability, passing and vision. However, while Kompany managed to maintain a high level of play match after match, Vanden Borre's Anderlecht career was marked by irregularity, lack of concentration and injuries. After several minor incidents, including a stint which featured him shaving the initials of his name 'AVB' into his hair, he received a 'bad boy'-label from both the press and his coaches.

While at Anderlecht, Vanden Borre was linked a move away from the club like Hamburger SV, Ajax, Inter Milan, Real Betis, Tottenham Hotspur, Juventus and Lazio.

But eventually, he decided to extend his contract with Anderlecht until 2010, during the 2005–06 season.

=== Italian career ===
Vanden Borre joined Fiorentina, completing his move on 1 June 2007, for €4 million and signing a four-year contract that will keep him until 2012. The move was previously made on 8 March 2007, with an agreement, according to his agent. He made his Serie A debut on 7 October against Juventus, coming on for Giampaolo Pazzini. Having made two appearances, Vanden Borre said he was developing at the club, though he was not playing.

On 19 January 2008, Vanden Borre was on the move again. This time, joining Serie a side Genoa in a co-ownership deal for €2.1 million, with Papa Waigo moving the opposite way also in co-ownership deal, also for €2.1 million. After the move, Vanden Borre says joining Genoa is a great opportunity to play. On 8 March 2008, Vanden Borre made his debut, coming on as a substitute in the 78th minute, in a 2–0 loss against Juventus. In an interview with Belgium Soccer, he stated he want to stay at Genoa, insisting he is happy there In June 2008, Genoa announced that the club had acquired the full rights of the player for €1.7 million, following eight appearances at the club. In his first full season at Genoa, Vanden Borre made twenty-five appearances for the club, under manager Gian Piero Gasperini. However, the next season, Vanden Borre was soon available on a transfer and has since fallen out of the first team.

=== Portsmouth ===
On 13 August 2009, it was announced that Vanden Borre had joined Portsmouth on a season-long loan. He made his debut for the club on 19 August 2009 against Birmingham. He scored his first goal for Portsmouth in a 3–1 Football League Cup win over Carlisle United on 22 September 2009. On 6 February 2010, he scored an own-goal in a 5–0 loss against Manchester United. Two months later, on 3 April 2010, Vanden Borre received two bookings in a 0–0 draw against Blackburn. This sending off entered football folklore as the red card that was missed by Chris Kamara while reporting on the match for Soccer Saturday. After the match, he accused referee Steve Bennett of costing him his dream of playing at Wembley as he had to serve a one-match suspension. However, his time at Portsmouth was difficult, battling to hold down a regular place in the Portsmouth defence as the club was relegated to the Championship. At the end of the season, new manager Steve Cotterill announced that Vanden Borre would not be returning to the club, having expected to extend his stay at Portsmouth, and he was subsequently linked with German side FC Köln.

=== Genk ===
After returning to Genoa from a loan spell at Portsmouth, Vanden Borre was heavily linked a move away in the transfer window, including a return to Pompey as part of Kevin-Prince Boateng's deal. But, Vanden Borre announced he would move to Belgian side Genk in a temporary deal. However, the move fell through, due to the interest from Hapoel Tel Aviv, despite he already signed a six-month contract with Genk, without a mutual agreement between the transfer fee. Eventually, Genoa released the player for free, effectively on 5 January 2011 the re-opening of the transfer window and with-in the time frame of Genoa's 2011 financial year. Vanden Borre also signed a two-year deal, with an option of a third year on 8 September 2010 and he won't play until January 2011, though playing in friendlies and reserve team.

A week after being an official player, he made his debut for the club, coming on as a substitute for Kevin De Bruyne in the 78th minute, in a 3–2 win over Kortrijk on 22 January 2011. In the last game of Jupiler Pro League before splitting to PlayOff I, he received two bookings, in a 1–1 draw against Standard Liège. In the PlayOff I, he played almost every game in action and thus played an important role in achieving the national title.

The next season, Vanden Borre was involved with the squad, playing in the Champions League campaign, which led to Group-stage. While in the league, he often play in the first team, but received more disciplined under newly manager Mario Been. In a match against Zulte Waregem on 15 January 2012, he received a booking on the 18th minute and was substituted in the 78th minute. He wasn't featured for five games and made his return. In PlayOff I, Vanden Borre scored his first goal for the club, in a 3–1 win over his former club, Anderlecht on 14 April 2012. At the end of the season, he wasn't offered a new contract at the club, which had decided not to retain him. After his release, Vanden Borre was linked heavily, once again, with the club, but the move never happened. However, in October, he joined Ukrainian side Tavriya Simferopol, until the end of the season. But his time in Ukraine was short-lived.

=== Return to Anderlecht ===
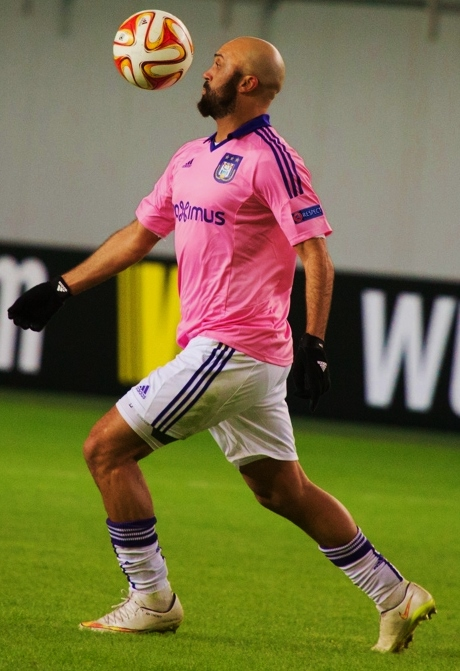
Vanden Borre playing for Anderlecht in 2015

In 2013, after five years away from the club, Vanden Borre made his return to Anderlecht, until the end of the season after being given a second chance by team-manager Herman Van Holsbeeck. His move was welcomed by teammates when the team had a training scheduled. Having made a comeback with the reserve team on 4 March 2013, Vanden Borre made a league comeback, a week later on 16 March 2013, coming on for Ronald Vargas, in a 1–1 draw against Genk.

On 4 November 2014, in a Champions League group match at Arsenal, he scored two goals (one a penalty) as Anderlecht earned a draw from being 3–0 down after 60 minutes.

==== Loan to Montpellier ====
On 8 July 2016, Vanden Borre joined Ligue 1 side Montpellier on season-long loan with the option of signing permanently. After 10 appearances in all competitions for Montpellier, he returned to Anderlecht in January 2017.

=== Initial retirement ===
On 10 January 2017, Vanden Borre announced his retirement from football at the age of 29.

=== TP Mazembe ===
On 2 March 2017, after less than two months in retirement, Vanden Borre signed for Congolese side TP Mazembe, however his stay only lasted 4 months.

=== Second return to Anderlecht ===
After three years without a club, Vanden Borre returned to Anderlecht, once again reuniting with Vincent Kompany who was manager.

== International career ==
Holding Belgian and Democratic Republic of Congo citizenship, Vanden Borre played his first international match, opting for Belgium at age sixteen, having come on for Eric Deflandre as a substitute in a late minutes, as Belgium lose 3–2 against Turkey on 28 April 2004. One year later, on 4 June 2005, Vanden Borre made his first start, in a 0–0 draw against Serbia and Montenegro. Vanden Borre has since represented the national team by playing at the 2007 UEFA European Under-21 Football Championship and the 2008 Summer Olympics.

On 13 May 2014, Vanden Borre was named in Belgium's squad for the 2014 FIFA World Cup.

== Personal life ==
Born in Likasi, Zaire, Vanden Borre moved to Belgium at early age. He is the son of a Belgian Flemish father and a Congolese mother.

== Career statistics ==
=== Club ===
As of match played 4 November 2016

Appearances and goals by club, season and competition
Club	Season	League			National cup		League cup		Other		Total	
Club	Season	Division	Apps	Goals	Apps	Goals	Apps	Goals	Apps	Goals	Apps	Goals
Anderlecht	2003–04	Belgian First Division	8	0	0	0	—		0	0	8	0
Anderlecht	2004–05	Belgian First Division	19	0	0	0	—		7 (Note: Six appearances in UEFA Champions League, one appearance in Belgian Super Cup)	0	26	0
Anderlecht	2005–06	Belgian First Division	22	3	0	0	—		8 (Note: Appearances in UEFA Champions League)	0	30	3
Anderlecht	2006–07	Belgian First Division	20	0	3	0	—		6	1	29	1
Anderlecht	Total		69	3	3	0	—		21	1	93	4
Fiorentina	2007–08	Serie A	2	0	1	0	—		2 (Note: Appearances in UEFA Cup)	0	5	0
Genoa	2007–08	Serie A	6	0	0	0	—		—		6	0
Genoa	2008–09	Serie A	25	0	2	0	—		—		27	0
Genoa	2009–10	Serie A	0	0	0	0	—		0	0	0	0
Genoa	2010–11	Serie A	0	0	0	0	—		—		0	0
Genoa	Total		31	0	2	0	—		0	0	33	0
Portsmouth (loan)	2009–10	Premier League	19	0	2	0	4	1	—		25	1
Genk	2010–11	Belgian Pro League	16	0	0	0	—		—		16	0
Genk	2011–12	Belgian Pro League	26	1	1	0	—		1 (Note: Appearances in Belgian Super Cup)	0	28	1
Genk	Total		42	1	1	0	—		1	0	44	1
Anderlecht	2012–13	Belgian Pro League	1	0	0	0	—		0	0	1	0
Anderlecht	2013–14	Belgian Pro League	27	0	1	0	—		3	0	31	0
Anderlecht	2014–15	Belgian Pro League	20	1	3	1	—		6	2	29	4
Anderlecht	2015–16	Belgian Pro League	2	0	0	0	—		0	0	2	0
Anderlecht	2016–17	Belgian Pro League	0	0	0	0	—		0	0	0	0
Anderlecht	Total		50	1	4	1	—		9	2	63	4
Montpellier (loan)	2016–17	Ligue 1	10	0	0	0	0	0	0	0	10	0
Career total			226	5	13	1	4	1	33	3	276	10

=== International ===
Scores and results lists Belgium's goal tally first.

Goal	Date	Venue	Opponent	Score	Result	Competition
1.	11 May 2006	Wagner & Partners Stadion, Sittard, Netherlands	Saudi Arabia	2–1	2–1	Friendly

== Honours ==
Genk

- Belgian Pro League: 2010–11
- Belgian Super Cup: 2011

Portsmouth

- FA Cup runner-up: 2010
