= Gauthier Mahoto =

French footballer (born 1992)

Personal information
- Full name: Eric Gauthier Mahoto
- Date of birth: 21 February 1992 (age 34)
- Place of birth: Paris, France
- Height: 1.85 m (6 ft 1 in)
- Position: Midfielder

Youth career
- INF Clairefontaine
- –2008: Le Havre
- 2008–2009: Portsmouth
- 2010: Bastia B
- 2010–2011: AEK Athens

Senior career*
Years	Team	Apps	(Gls)
2008–2010	Portsmouth	0	(0)
2011–2012	Le Mans B	17	(2)
2012–2013	Atlético Baleares	3	(0)
2013–2014	Saint-Quentin		
2014–2020	Marsouins		
- * Club domestic league appearances and goals

Eric Gauthier Mahoto (born 21 February 1992) is a French retired footballer who played as a central midfielder.

== Early life ==
Mahoto was born in the 18th arrondissement of Paris, to a Zairean mother born in Congo-Léopoldville. He acquired French nationality on 22 December 2003, through the collective effect of his mother's naturalization.

== Club career ==
Mahoto started his footballing career in France whilst playing for Le Havre. He also attended the French Football Federation's INF Clairefontaine academy. He got a growing reputation as a talented midfielder, which led to Portsmouth signing Mahoto for an undisclosed compensation fee.

=== Portsmouth ===
His initial first six months at the club were disrupted by international clearance issues. Whilst at Portsmouth, he established himself as an essential member of both the academy squad and Guy Whittingham's development side. Mahoto came on as a substitute against Rangers in a pre-season friendly.

On 25 August 2009, Mahoto made his first-team debut coming in as a substitute for Richard Hughes in Portsmouth's 4–1 victory over Hereford United in the League Cup.

=== Bastia ===
On the last day of the 2009-2010 winter transfer window, Mahoto signed a 2 1/2-year contract with French club SC Bastia. He did not make an appearance for Bastia however and was (confusingly) officially released by Portsmouth in August 2010 by mutual consent.

=== AEK and Le Mans ===
Mahoto spent time with AEK Athens, but only played for the youth team. In July 2011, he joined Le Mans FC. However, he only featured for their reserve side in the CFA Group D, and left the club at the end of the season.

=== Atlético Baleares ===
In October 2012, Mahoto left France and joined CD Atlético Baleares, in Spanish third level.
