= UHY Hacker Young =

Group of chartered accountants

- Type: Network of independent firms
- Industry: Professional services
- Founded: London, United Kingdom (1925)
- Headquarters: London, United Kingdom
- Key people: Colin Wright, (Group Chairman); Subarna Banerjee, (Managing Partner)
- Services: Accounting; Audit; Financial audit Bookkeeping; Business advisory Corporate finance Corporate tax FCA compliance Private client services Services for international businesses Turnaround & recovery Tax investigations VAT
- Revenue: ▼ Uk£78.9 million (2025)
- Number of employees: 990 (2024)
- Website: Official website

UHY Hacker Young, Newport

UHY Hacker Young is a British group of chartered accountants, with 91 partners and 722 professional staff operating from 22 offices across the UK. Established in London in 1925, the group is also a founding member of UHY International, the 19th largest international network of accounting firms with 318 offices located in 95 countries across the globe.

== History ==
UHY Hacker Young was founded by Johnny Rubens and Mark Hacker, both qualified accountants, who opened their first office in Chancery Lane, London. Initially focusing on assisting individuals with financial difficulties, they expanded their services over the years to include tax advice and compliance. In 1961, a merger with Stuart Young & Co led to the adoption of the name Hacker, Rubens, Phillips & Young, which was later shortened to Hacker Young. The firm continued to grow, opening offices in Manchester and Nottingham in the mid-1960s, marking the beginning of a national network.

Since its foundation, the firm has offered a broad range of services, including bookkeeping and auditing, tax compliance and advice, corporate recovery and company secretarial services. UHY Hacker Young has also helped companies float on the Alternative Investment Market (AIM) since its inception in 1995, providing them with advice on pre-IPO fund-raising, admissions, due diligence and tax assistance and planning.

== Services ==
UHY Hacker Young offers services including:

- Audit and assurance
- Business advisory and accounting
- Corporate finance
- Corporate tax and VAT
- Private client services
- Turnaround and recovery
- Cloud accounting
- Services for international businesses
- Tax investigations

These services cater to various sectors, such as charities, academies, manufacturing, healthcare, property, technology, and more.

== Offices ==
The UHY Hacker Young Group comprises 22 offices across England, Wales, and Northern Ireland. These 22 offices are known under the following titles:

- UHY Hacker Young - London, Nottingham, Abergavenny, Ashford, Birmingham, Brighton & Hove, Bristol, Broadstairs, Chester, Newport, Sittingbourne, Sheffield & Winchester
- UHY BPR Heaton - Leeds
- UHY Calvert Smith - York
- UHY Hacker Young Fitch - Belfast
- UHY Ross Brooke - Abingdon, Hungerford, Newbury, Swindon
- UHY Williamson & Croft - Manchester & Liverpool
