= 2021–22 Al Sadd SC season =

Al Sadd SC
2021–22 season
- Chairman: Muhammed bin Khalifa Al Thani
- Head coach: Xavi (until 5 November 2021); Javi Gracia (from 8 December 2021)
- Stadium: Jassim Bin Hamad Stadium
- Qatar Stars League: 1st
- Emir of Qatar Cup: 2021: Winners; 2022: Semi-finals
- Champions League: Group stage
- Top goalscorer: League: André Ayew (15); All: André Ayew (16)
Home colours	Away colours	Third colours

In the 2021–22 season, Al Sadd SC is competing in the Qatar Stars League for the 49th season, as well as the Emir of Qatar Cup and the Champions League. On November 3, after the match against Al-Duhail, Xavi left the club to be the new coach of FC Barcelona six years after his departure and this is after an agreement was reached between the two clubs.

== Squad list ==
Players and squad numbers last updated on 3 September 2021.
Note: Flags indicate national team as has been defined under FIFA eligibility rules. Players may hold more than one non-FIFA nationality.

No.	Nat.	Position	Name	Date of Birth (Age)	Signed from
Goalkeepers
1	(Qatar)	GK	Saad Al Sheeb	19 February 1990 (aged 31)	(Qatar) Al Sailiya
22	(Qatar)	GK	Meshaal Barsham	14 February 1998 (aged 23)	(Qatar) Youth system
Defenders
2	(Qatar)	CB	Pedro Miguel	6 August 1990 (aged 31)	(Qatar) Al Ahli
3	(Qatar)	LB	Abdelkarim Hassan	28 August 1993 (aged 28)	(Qatar) Youth system
12	(Qatar)	RB	Hamid Ismail	12 September 1987 (aged 34)	(Qatar) Al-Arabi
66	(Qatar)	CB	Yasser Abubakar	10 January 1992 (aged 29)	(Qatar) El Jaish
15	(Qatar)	CB	Tarek Salman	5 December 1997 (aged 23)	(Spain) Júpiter Leonés
16	(Qatar)	LB / CB	Boualem Khoukhi	7 September 1990 (aged 31)	(Qatar) Al Arabi
70	(Qatar)	RB	Musab Kheder	1 January 1993 (aged 28)	(Qatar) Youth system
Midfielders
4	(Qatar)	DM	Ahmed Sayyar	6 October 1993 (aged 27)	(Qatar) Al-Gharafa
5	(South Korea)	DM	Jung Woo-young	14 December 1989 (aged 31)	(Japan) Vissel Kobe
8	(Qatar)	CM	Ali Assadalla	19 January 1993 (aged 28)	(Bahrain) Al Muharraq
18	(Spain)	CM	Santi Cazorla	13 December 1984 (aged 37)	(Spain) Villarreal
23	(Qatar)	RW	Hashim Ali	17 August 2000 (aged 21)	(Qatar) Youth system
20	(Qatar)	DM	Salem Al-Hajri	10 April 1996 (aged 25)	(Belgium) Eupen
24	(Ghana)	AM	André Ayew	17 December 1989 (aged 31)	(Wales) Swansea City
13	(Brazil)	DM	Guilherme Torres	5 April 1991 (aged 30)	(Greece) Olympiacos
Forwards
9	(Qatar)	ST	Abdulaziz Al Ansari	19 February 1992 (aged 29)	(Qatar) Al Kharaitiyat
10	(Qatar)	RW	Hassan Al-Haidos	11 December 1990 (aged 30)	(Qatar) Youth system
11	(Algeria)	ST	Baghdad Bounedjah	24 November 1991 (aged 29)	(Tunisia) Étoile du Sahel
78	(Qatar)	LW	Akram Afif	18 November 1996 (aged 24)	(Qatar) Al Markhiya

== Pre-season and friendlies ==
9 August 2021 Pre-season	UE Figueres (Spain)	3–5	Al Sadd	Olot, Spain
		Report	Ayew 50'; Bounedjah 60', 75'; Cazorla 71' (pen.); Al-Manai 78'

14 August 2021 Pre-season	CE Sabadell (Spain)	3–2	Al Sadd	Olot, Spain
18:45	? 5'; ? 89'	Report	Ayew 40'; Cazorla 72'

26 August 2021 Pre-season	Al Sadd	2–1 (Note: The match was divided into four quarters of 20 minutes each.)	Lusail SC	Doha
19:00	Al-Yazidi (?); Bounedjah (?)	Report		Attendance: 0

== Competitions ==
=== Overview ===
Competition	Record								Started round	Final position / round	First match	Last match
Competition	G	W	D	L	GF	GA	GD	Win %	Started round	Final position / round	First match	Last match
Qatar Stars League	22	20	2	0	80	24	+56	90.91	Matchday 1	Winner	12 September 2021	11 March 2022
2021 Emir of Qatar Cup	1	1	0	0	1	1	+0	100.00	Final	Winners	22 October 2021	
2022 Emir of Qatar Cup	3	2	0	1	7	3	+4	66.67	Round of 16	Semi-finals	13 February 2022	14 March 2022
2022 Champions League	6	2	1	3	10	11	−1	33.33	Group stage		8 April 2022	27 April 2022
Total	32	25	3	4	98	39	+59	78.13				

Updated to match played 29 April 2021
Source: Competitions

=== Qatar Stars League ===
==== League table ====
Pos	Team	Pld	W	D	L	GF	GA	GD	Pts	Qualification or relegation
1	Al Sadd (C)	22	20	2	0	80	24	+56	62	Qualification for AFC Champions League group stage
2	Al Duhail	22	14	5	3	59	24	+35	47	Qualification for AFC Champions League play-off round (Note: as 2022 Emir of Qatar Cup winner)
3	Al-Wakrah	22	11	4	7	34	30	+4	37	
4	Al-Arabi	22	11	3	8	34	31	+3	36	
5	Al-Gharafa	22	9	3	10	39	40	−1	30	

Source: QSL, Soccerway
Rules for classification: 1) Points; 2) Goal difference; 3) Number of goals scored;
(C) Champions

==== Results summary ====
Overall								Home						Away					
Pld	W	D	L	GF	GA	GD	Pts	W	D	L	GF	GA	GD	W	D	L	GF	GA	GD
21	19	2	0	78	23	+55	59	9	1	0	31	10	+21	10	1	0	47	13	+34

Last updated: 8 March 2022.
Source: Competitive matches

==== Results by round ====
Round	1	2	3	4	5	6	7	8	9	10	11	12	13	14	15	16	17	18	19	20	21	22
Ground	H	A	A	H	A	H	A	H	A	H	A	A	H	H	A	H	A	H	A	H	A	H
Result	W	W	W	W	W	W	W	W	D	W	W	W	W	W	W	W	W	W	W	D	W	
Position	3	2	1	1	1	1	1	1	1	1	1	1	1	1	1	1	1	1	1	1	1	1

Updated to match(es) played on 8 March 2022. Source: Competitive matches
A = Away; H = Home; W = Win; D = Draw; L = Loss

==== Matches ====
Win Draw Loss

12 September 2021 Round 1	Al-Sadd	2–0	Al-Sailiya	Doha
21:20	Khoukhi 23'; Tabata 33'	Report		Stadium: Thani bin Jassim Stadium; Referee: Youssef Alsharshani

16 September 2021 Round 2	Qatar SC	1–3	Al-Sadd	Doha
17:50	Soria 39'	Report	Ayew 63'; Guilherme Torres 78'; Bounedjah 83'	Stadium: Khalifa International Stadium; Referee: Saoud Al Athbah

22 September 2021 Round 3	Al-Rayyan	2–4	Al-Sadd	Doha
19:30	Hashim Ali 45+2'; Hatem 49'	Report	Al-Haidos 4'; Bounedjah 21'; Ayew 24'; Akram Afif 58'	Stadium: Khalifa International Stadium; Referee: Abdulrahman Al Jassim

26 September 2021 Round 4	Al-Sadd	7–2	Al-Shamal	Doha
19:30	Assadalla 10'; Bounedjah 13', 89'; Ayew 15'; Nani 54' (o.g.); Abdurisag 57'; Tabata 85'	Report	Al-Yazidi 12'; Al-Malki 87'	Stadium: Khalifa International Stadium; Referee: Hamad Al Subaie

1 October 2021 Round 5	Al-Arabi	0–4	Al-Sadd	Doha
19:15		Report	Bounedjah 59', 74'; Al-Haidos 61'; Ayew 82' (pen.)	Stadium: Khalifa International Stadium; Referee: Khamis Al Marri

17 October 2021 Round 6	Al-Sadd	6–4	Al-Gharafa	Doha
17:30	Bounedjah 7', 51'; El-Hadj 14' (o.g.); Fadlalla 17' (o.g.); Al-Haidos 40'; Ayew 89'	Report	Fadlalla 29'; Diabaté 21', 45'; Alaaeldin 56'	Stadium: Thani bin Jassim Stadium; Referee: Salman Ahmad Flahi

26 October 2021 Round 7	Umm Salal	1–3	Al-Sadd	Al Wakrah
18:20	al-Bakhit 6'	Report	Akram Afif 13'; Cazorla 29'; Ayew 49'	Stadium: Saoud bin Abdulrahman Stadium; Referee: Khalid Nabet

30 October 2021 Round 8	Al-Sadd	4–1	Al-Ahli	Doha
20:30	Al-Haidos 25'; Bounedjah 54', 85' (pen.); Ayew 79' (pen.)	Report	Eze 68' (pen.)	Stadium: Thani bin Jassim Stadium; Referee: Hamad Al Subaie

3 November 2021 Round 9	Al-Duhail	3–3	Al-Sadd	Doha
19:55	Olunga 24', 89'; Pedro Miguel 31' (o.g.)	Report	Bounedjah 4'; Khoukhi 73'; Tabata 74'	Stadium: Thani bin Jassim Stadium; Referee: Meshari Al shammari

25 December 2021 Round 10	Al-Sadd	3–0	Al-Khor	Doha
16:05	Akram Afif 3'; Ayew 25', 40'	Report		Stadium: Suheim Bin Hamad Stadium; Referee: Mohammed Al-Sherif

3 January 2022 Round 12	Al-Sailiya	0–2	Al-Sadd	Doha
18:20		Report	Akram Afif 42', 62' (pen.)	Stadium: Suheim Bin Hamad Stadium; Referee: Khalid Nabet

18 January 2022 Round 15	Al-Shamal	1–5	Al-Sadd	Doha
16:20	Al-Salemi 31'	Report	Akram Afif 40'; Tabata 54'; Assadalla 63'; Al-Haidos 68'; Tarek 79'	Stadium: Thani bin Jassim Stadium; Referee: Sultan Al Sharshani

22 January 2022 Round 16	Al-Sadd	4–2	Al-Arabi	Doha
19:15	Cazorla 7' (pen.); Akram Afif 45+2', 54', 83'	Report	Hamid Ismail 45' (pen.); Ilyas Bakur 52'	Stadium: Grand Hamad Stadium; Referee: Abdulrahman Al Jassim

31 January 2022 Round 11	Al-Wakrah	0–6	Al-Sadd	Al Wakrah
16:30		Report	Akram Afif 12', 58'; Tabata 17'; Al-Haidos 33'; Ayew 66'; Hassan 90+2'	Stadium: Saoud bin Abdulrahman Stadium; Referee: Abdulhadi Al Ruaile

5 February 2022 Round 17	Al-Gharafa	1–5	Al-Sadd	Doha
16:35	Gabriel 76'	Report	Hassan 2'; Tabata 25'; Cazorla 74'; Ayew 90+4' (pen.), 90+5'	Stadium: Jassim Bin Hamad Stadium; Referee: Khamis Al Marri

9 February 2022 Round 18	Al-Sadd	2–0	Umm Salal	Doha
16:40	Bounedjah 15'; Cazorla 90+2'	Report		Stadium: Jassim Bin Hamad Stadium; Referee: Saoud Al Athbah

17 February 2022 Round 13	Al-Sadd	1–0	Qatar SC	Doha
18:00	Ellethy 7' (o.g.)	Report		Stadium: Suheim Bin Hamad Stadium; Referee: Salman Ahmad Flahi

21 February 2022 Round 19	Al-Ahli	2–8	Al-Sadd	Doha
16:45	Umaru 51'; Al Seyed 61'	Report	Akram Afif 10'; Al-Haidos 29' (pen.); Khoukhi 33'; Cazorla 36'; Bounedjah 43'; Ayew 62', 90+4'; Abdurisag 77'	Stadium: Hamad bin Khalifa Stadium; Referee: Khalid Nabet

25 February 2022 Round 20	Al-Sadd	1–1	Al-Duhail	Doha
19:00	Akram Afif 59'	Report	Edmilson 36' (pen.)	Stadium: Jassim Bin Hamad Stadium; Referee: Abdullah Al Athbah

1 March 2022 Round 21	Al-Khor	2–4	Al-Sadd	Al Khor
19:00	Khoukhi 47' (o.g.); Al Saadi 83'	Report	Assadalla 32'; Cazorla 67'; Akram Afif 68'; Ayew 79'	Stadium: Al-Khor SC Stadium; Referee: Khamis Al Marri

8 March 2022 Round 14	Al-Sadd	1–0	Al-Rayyan	Doha
18:15	Hassan 26'	Report		Stadium: Jassim Bin Hamad Stadium; Referee: Salman Ahmad Flahi

11 March 2022 Round 22	Al-Sadd	2–1	Al-Wakrah	Doha
19:10	Khoukhi 19'; Tabata 79' (pen.)	Report	Al-Halabi 50'	Stadium: Suheim Bin Hamad Stadium; Referee: Mohammed Al-Shammari

== 2021 Emir of Qatar Cup ==
22 October 2021 Final	Al-Rayyan	1–1 (4–5 p)	Al Sadd SC	Al Thumama
18:01	Brahimi 44' (pen.)	Report	Cazorla 58' (pen.)	Stadium: Al Thumama Stadium; Referee: Abdullah Al Athbah
	Penalties
	Yacine Brahimi (penalty scored); Yohan Boli (penalty scored); Abdulaziz Hatem (penalty scored); Steven Nzonzi (penalty scored); Shoja' Khalilzadeh (penalty missed)		(penalty scored) Santi Cazorla; (penalty scored) Rodrigo Tabata; (penalty scored) Akram Afif; (penalty scored) Boualem Khoukhi; (penalty scored) Jung Woo-young

== 2022 Emir of Qatar Cup ==
13 February 2022 Round of 16	Al Sadd	1–0	Muaither	Doha
16:40	Abdurisag 13'	Report		Stadium: Grand Hamad Stadium; Referee: Mohammed Al-Sherif

5 March 2022 Quarter-finals	Al Sadd	4–0	Al-Ahli	Doha
16:50	Hassan 3'; Ayew 5'; Tabata 75'; Akram Afif 78'	Report		Stadium: Jassim Bin Hamad Stadium; Referee: Saoud Al Athbah

14 March 2022 Semi-finals	Al Sadd	2–3	Al-Duhail	Doha
19:45	Ayew 33'; Bounedjah 90'	Report	Sassi 7', 80'; Olunga 44'	Stadium: Jassim Bin Hamad Stadium; Referee: Salman Ahmad Flahi

== 2022 AFC Champions League ==
=== Group stage ===
On 16 February 2022, AFC confirmed hosts for the East group stage. On 3 March 2022, AFC confirmed hosts for the West group stage.

- Group E: Dammam, Saudi Arabia

==== Group E ====
Pos	Team	Pld	W	D	L	GF	GA	GD	Pts	Qualification	FAI	NAS	SAD	WEH
1	(Saudi Arabia) Al-Faisaly (H)	6	2	3	1	5	4	+1	9 (Note: Head-to-head points: Al-Faisaly 4, Nasaf Qarshi 1.)	Advance to Round of 16	—	0–0	2–1	1–1
2	(Uzbekistan) Nasaf Qarshi	6	2	3	1	8	5	+3	9	Advance to Round of 16	0–1	—	3–1	2–0
3	(Qatar) Al-Sadd	6	2	1	3	10	11	−1	7		1–0	1–1	—	5–2
4	(Jordan) Al-Wehdat	6	1	3	2	9	12	−3	6		1–1	2–2	3–1	—

Source: AFC
(H) Hosts
Notes:

8 April 2022 1	Al Sadd SC (Qatar)	1–1	(Uzbekistan) Nasaf Qarshi	Dammam
20:15 UTC+3	Khoukhi 55'	Report	Miguel 31' (o.g.)	Stadium: Prince Mohamed bin Fahd Stadium; Attendance: 230; Referee: Hanna Hattab (Syria)

11 April 2022 2	Al-Faisaly (Saudi Arabia)	2–1	(Qatar) Al Sadd SC	Dammam
23:15 UTC+3	Faik 16'; Tavares 53'	Report	Al-Haydos 4'	Stadium: Prince Mohamed bin Fahd Stadium; Attendance: 700; Referee: Fu Ming (China)

15 April 2022 3	Al Sadd SC (Qatar)	5–2	(Jordan) Al-Wehdat	Dammam
20:15 UTC+3	Afif 23' (pen.); Cazorla 58'; Ayew 62'; Tabata 72'; Al-Bayati 90+3'	Report	Samir 42'; Anas 44'	Stadium: Prince Mohamed bin Fahd Stadium; Referee: Mohanad Qasim Sarray (Iraq)

19 April 2022 4	Al-Wehdat (Jordan)	3–1	(Qatar) Al Sadd SC	Dammam
20:15 UTC+3	Al-Dmeiri 48'; Assam 60'; Samir 75'	Report	Tabata 54'	Stadium: Prince Mohamed bin Fahd Stadium; Attendance: 400; Referee: Kim Dae-yong (South Korea)

23 April 2022 5	Nasaf Qarshi (Uzbekistan)	3–1	(Qatar) Al Sadd SC	Dammam
20:15 UTC+3	Mozgovoy 63', 77'; Norchaev 75'	Report	Tabata 90+1'	Stadium: Prince Mohamed bin Fahd Stadium; Attendance: 85; Referee: Ma Ning (China)

27 April 2022 6	Al Sadd SC (Qatar)	1–0	(Saudi Arabia) Al-Faisaly	Dammam
23:15 UTC+3	Ró-Ró 45+2'	Report		Stadium: Prince Mohamed bin Fahd Stadium; Referee: Hettikamkanamge Perera (Sri Lanka)

== Squad information ==
=== Playing statistics ===
As of 14 March 2022

No.	Pos	Nat	Player	Total		Qatar Stars League		Emir of Qatar Cup		AFC CL1		Other	
No.	Pos	Nat	Player	Apps	Goals	Apps	Goals	Apps	Goals	Apps	Goals	Apps	Goals
1	GK	(Qatar) QAT	Saad Al Sheeb	10	0	7	0	3	0	0	0	0	0
22	GK	(Qatar) QAT	Meshaal Barsham	15	0	14	0	1	0	0	0	0	0
31	GK	(Qatar) QAT	Yousef Baliadeh	1	0	1	0	0	0	0	0	0	0
2	DF	(Qatar) QAT	Pedro Miguel	18	0	15	0	3	0	0	0	0	0
3	DF	(Qatar) QAT	Abdelkarim Hassan	20	4	17	3	3	1	0	0	0	0
21	DF	(Qatar) QAT	Abdelrahman Rashid	3	0	3	0	0	0	0	0	0	0
16	MF	(Qatar) QAT	Boualem Khoukhi	16	4	12	4	4	0	0	0	0	0
20	DF	(Qatar) QAT	Salem Al-Hajri	1	0	1	0	0	0	0	0	0	0
70	DF	(Qatar) QAT	Musab Kheder	19	0	18	0	1	0	0	0	0	0
4	MF	(Qatar) QAT	Ahmed Sayyar	7	0	6	0	1	0	0	0	0	0
5	MF	(South Korea) KOR	Jung Woo-young	24	0	21	0	3	0	0	0	0	0
8	MF	(Qatar) QAT	Ali Assadalla	25	3	21	3	4	0	0	0	0	0
6	MF	(Qatar) QAT	Tarek Salman	22	0	19	0	3	0	0	0	0	0
14	MF	(Qatar) QAT	Mostafa Tarek	7	0	6	0	1	0	0	0	0	0
7	MF	(Qatar) QAT	Mohammed Al Bayati	10	0	9	0	1	0	0	0	0	0
19	MF	(Spain) ESP	Santi Cazorla	20	7	16	6	4	1	0	0	0	0
17	MF	(Brazil) BRA	Guilherme Torres	24	1	21	1	3	0	0	0	0	0
	MF	(Qatar) QAT	Bahaa Ellithi	0	0	0	0	0	0	0	0	0	0
10	MF	(Qatar) QAT	Hassan Al-Haidos	21	7	19	7	2	0	0	0	0	0
11	FW	(Algeria) ALG	Baghdad Bounedjah	20	14	17	13	3	1	0	0	0	0
12	FW	(Qatar) QAT	Rodrigo Tabata	25	8	21	7	4	1	0	0	0	0
13	FW	(Qatar) QAT	Abdullah Badr Al Yazidi	9	0	8	0	1	0	0	0	0	0
15	MF	(Qatar) QAT	Akram Afif	22	15	18	14	4	1	0	0	0	0
9	FW	(Qatar) QAT	Yusuf Abdurisag	16	3	14	2	2	1	0	0	0	0
24	FW	(Ghana) GHA	André Ayew	25	17	21	15	4	2	0	0	0	0
Players transferred out during the season

Last updated: 14 March 2022
Source: fr.soccerway.com

=== Goalscorers ===
As of 14 March 2022

Includes all competitive matches. The list is sorted alphabetically by surname when total goals are equal.

No.	Nat.	Player	Pos.	QSL	QEC	CPC	CL 1	TOTAL
	(Ghana)	André Ayew	MF	15	2	0	0	17
	(Qatar)	Akram Afif	FW	14	1	0	0	15
	(Algeria)	Baghdad Bounedjah	FW	13	1	0	0	14
	(Qatar)	Rodrigo Tabata	FW	7	1	0	0	8
	(Qatar)	Hassan Al-Haidos	FW	7	0	0	0	7
	(Spain)	Santi Cazorla	MF	6	1	0	0	7
	(Qatar)	Abdelkarim Hassan	DF	3	1	0	0	4
	(Qatar)	Boualem Khoukhi	DF	4	0	0	0	4
	(Qatar)	Yusuf Abdurisag	FW	2	1	0	0	3
	(Qatar)	Ali Assadalla	MF	3	0	0	0	3
	(Brazil)	Guilherme Torres	MF	1	0	0	0	1
	(Qatar)	Mostafa Tarek	MF	1	0	0	0	1
Own Goals				4	0	0	0	4
Totals				80	8	0	0	88

=== Assists ===
No.	Nat.	Player	Pos.	QSL	QEC	CPC	CL 1	TOTAL
	(Qatar)	Akram Afif	FW	17	1	0	0	18
	(Spain)	Santi Cazorla	MF	9	3	0	0	12
	(Qatar)	Ali Assadalla	MF	5	1	0	0	6
	(Qatar)	Hassan Al-Haidos	FW	5	0	0	0	5
	(Qatar)	Baghdad Bounedjah	FW	5	0	0	0	5
	(Qatar)	Abdelkarim Hassan	DF	4	1	0	0	5
	(Qatar)	Rodrigo Tabata	FW	3	0	0	0	3
	(Qatar)	Pedro Miguel	DF	2	0	0	0	2
	(South Korea)	Jung Woo-young	MF	2	0	0	0	2
	(Brazil)	Guilherme Torres	MF	2	0	0	0	2
	(Qatar)	Yusuf Abdurisag	MF	2	0	0	0	2
	(Ghana)	André Ayew	MF	1	0	0	0	1
	(Qatar)	Tarek Salman	DF	1	0	0	0	1
	(Qatar)	Ahmed Sayyar	MF	1	0	0	0	1
Totals				59	6	0	0	65

== Transfers ==
=== In ===
Date	Pos	Player	From club	Transfer fee	Source
22 July 2021	MF	(Ghana) André Ayew	(Wales) Swansea City	Free transfer	

=== Out ===
Date	Pos	Player	To club	Transfer fee	Source
9 July 2021	MF	(South Korea) Nam Tae-hee	Al-Duhail	Free transfer	
9 September 2021	MF	(Qatar) Hashim Ali	Al-Rayyan	Loan for one year	
10 September 2021	MF	(Qatar) Ahmed Suhail	Al-Arabi	Loan for one year	

== New contracts ==
No.	Pos	Player	Contract length	Contract end	Date	Source
5	DM	(South Korea) Jung Woo-young	2 years	2023	13 June 2021	
