= 2020–21 Al Sadd SC season =

Al Sadd SC
2020–21 season
- Chairman: Muhammed bin Khalifa Al Thani
- Head coach: Xavi
- Stadium: Jassim Bin Hamad Stadium
- Qatar Stars League: 1st
- Qatari Stars Cup: 2019-2020: Winners
- Emir of Qatar Cup: 2020: Winners; 2021: Semi-finals
- Crown Prince Cup: Winners
- Champions League: 2020: Round of 16; 2021: Group stage
- Top goalscorer: League: Baghdad Bounedjah (21); All: Baghdad Bounedjah (30)
Home colours	Away colours	Third colours

In the 2020–21 season, Al Sadd SC is competing in the Qatar Stars League for the 48th season, as well as the Emir of Qatar Cup and the Champions League.

== Squad list ==
Players and squad numbers last updated on 3 September 2020.
Note: Flags indicate national team as has been defined under FIFA eligibility rules. Players may hold more than one non-FIFA nationality.

No.	Nat.	Position	Name	Date of Birth (Age)	Signed from
Goalkeepers
1	(Qatar)	GK	Saad Al Sheeb	19 February 1990 (aged 30)	(Qatar) Al Sailiya
22	(Qatar)	GK	Meshaal Barsham	14 February 1998 (aged 22)	(Qatar) Youth system
Defenders
2	(Qatar)	CB	Pedro Miguel	6 August 1990 (aged 30)	(Qatar) Al Ahli
3	(Qatar)	LB	Abdelkarim Hassan	28 August 1993 (aged 27)	(Qatar) Youth system
12	(Qatar)	RB	Hamid Ismail	12 September 1987 (aged 33)	(Qatar) Al-Arabi
66	(Qatar)	CB	Yasser Abubakar	10 January 1992 (aged 28)	(Qatar) El Jaish
15	(Qatar)	CB	Tarek Salman	5 December 1997 (aged 22)	(Spain) Júpiter Leonés
16	(Qatar)	LB / CB	Boualem Khoukhi	7 September 1990 (aged 30)	(Qatar) Al Arabi
70	(Qatar)	RB	Musab Kheder	1 January 1993 (aged 27)	(Qatar) Youth system
Midfielders
4	(Qatar)	DM	Ahmed Sayyar	6 October 1993 (aged 26)	(Qatar) Al-Gharafa
5	(South Korea)	DM	Jung Woo-young	14 December 1989 (aged 30)	(Japan) Vissel Kobe
8	(Qatar)	CM	Ali Assadalla	19 January 1993 (aged 27)	(Bahrain) Al Muharraq
18	(Spain)	CM	Santi Cazorla	13 December 1984 (aged 36)	(Spain) Villarreal
19	(South Korea)	AM	Nam Tae-hee	3 July 1991 (aged 29)	(Qatar) Al-Duhail
23	(Qatar)	RW	Hashim Ali	17 August 2000 (aged 20)	(Qatar) Youth system
20	(Qatar)	DM	Salem Al-Hajri	10 April 1996 (aged 24)	(Belgium) Eupen
13	(Brazil)	DM	Guilherme Torres	5 April 1991 (aged 29)	(Greece) Olympiacos
	(Mexico)	AM	Marco Fabián	21 July 1989 (aged 30)	(United States) Philadelphia Union
Forwards
9	(Qatar)	ST	Abdulaziz Al Ansari	19 February 1992 (aged 28)	(Qatar) Al Kharaitiyat
10	(Qatar)	RW	Hassan Al-Haidos	11 December 1990 (aged 29)	(Qatar) Youth system
11	(Algeria)	ST	Baghdad Bounedjah	24 November 1991 (aged 28)	(Tunisia) Étoile du Sahel
78	(Qatar)	LW	Akram Afif	18 November 1996 (aged 23)	(Qatar) Al Markhiya

== Competitions ==
=== Overview ===
Competition	Record								Started round	Final position / round	First match	Last match
Competition	G	W	D	L	GF	GA	GD	Win %	Started round	Final position / round	First match	Last match
Qatar Stars League	22	19	3	0	77	14	+63	86.36	Matchday 1	Winner	3 September 2020	9 April 2021
Qatari Stars Cup	2	2	0	0	6	0	+6	100.00	Semi-finals	Winner	29 August 2020	10 October 2020
2020 Emir of Qatar Cup	2	2	0	0	6	2	+4	100.00	Semi-finals	Winner	31 October 2020	18 December 2020
2021 Emir of Qatar Cup	3	3	0	0	15	0	+15	100.00	Round of 16	Semi-finals	26 January 2021	7 May 2021
Qatar Crown Prince Cup	2	2	0	0	3	0	+3	100.00	Semi-finals	Winner	18 February 2021	26 February 2021
2020 Champions League	5	1	2	2	9	7	+2	20.00	Group stage	Round of 16	15 September 2020	27 September 2020
2021 Champions League	6	3	1	2	9	7	+2	50.00	Group stage		14 April 2021	29 April 2021
Total	40	30	6	4	119	30	+89	75.00				

Updated to match played 7 May 2021
Source: Competitions

=== Qatar Stars League ===
==== League table ====
Pos	Team	Pld	W	D	L	GF	GA	GD	Pts	Qualification or relegation
1	Al Sadd (C)	22	19	3	0	77	14	+63	60	Qualification for AFC Champions League group stage
2	Al Duhail	22	15	2	5	53	25	+28	47	Qualification for AFC Champions League group stage
3	Al-Rayyan	22	10	5	7	31	22	+9	35	Qualification for AFC Champions League group stage
4	Al-Gharafa	22	10	3	9	41	34	+7	33	Qualification for AFC Champions League play-off round
5	Al Ahli	22	10	3	9	28	38	−10	33	

Source: QSL, Soccerway
Rules for classification: 1) Points; 2) Goal difference; 3) Number of goals scored;
(C) Champions

==== Results summary ====
Overall								Home						Away					
Pld	W	D	L	GF	GA	GD	Pts	W	D	L	GF	GA	GD	W	D	L	GF	GA	GD
22	19	3	0	77	14	+63	60	10	1	0	42	7	+35	9	2	0	35	7	+28

Last updated: 10 April 2021.
Source: Competitive matches

==== Results by round ====
Round	1	2	3	4	5	6	7	8	9	10	11	12	13	14	15	16	17	18	19	20	21	22
Ground	A	A	A	A	A	A	H	A	H	A	A	H	H	H	H	H	H	A	H	A	H	H
Result	W	W	W	D	W	W	W	W	W	W	D	W	W	W	W	W	W	W	D	W	W	W
Position	1	1	1	1	1	1	1	1	1	1	1	1	1	1	1	1	1	1	1	1	1	1

Updated to match(es) played on 10 April 2021. Source: Competitive matches
A = Away; H = Home; W = Win; D = Draw; L = Loss

==== Matches ====
Win Draw Loss

3 September 2020 Round 1	Al Kharaitiyat	1–5	Al Sadd	Al-Rayyan
18:15	Tiberkanine 64'	Soccerway report	Cazorla 27', 60'; Bounedjah 55'; Salam 71' (o.g.); Akram Afif 84'	Stadium: Education City Stadium; Referee: Abdullah Al Athbah

7 September 2020 Round 2	Al-Sailiya	1–5	Al Sadd	Al-Rayyan
18:15	Siddiq 41'	Soccerway report	Al-Haidos 7'; Cazorla 30' (pen.); Bounedjah 59'; Nam Tae-hee 81'; Sayyar 88'	Stadium: Education City Stadium; Referee: Saoud Al Athbah

17 October 2020 Round 4	Al-Khor	0–0	Al Sadd	Al Khor
19:45		Soccerway report		Stadium: Al Bayt Stadium; Referee: Khamis Al Marri

21 October 2020 Round 3	Al-Duhail	1–3	Al Sadd	Doha
18:45	Dudu 86'	Soccerway report	Nam Tae-hee 22', 70'; Guilherme Torres 38'	Stadium: Abdullah bin Khalifa Stadium; Referee: Salman Ahmad Flahi

25 October 2020 Round 5	Al-Ahli	1–7	Al Sadd	Doha
17:30	El Zhar 54'	Soccerway report	Hashim Ali 5', 36'; Tabata 13'; Akram Afif 30'; Cazorla 45'; Nam Tae-hee 58'; Sayyar 90+1'	Stadium: Hamad bin Khalifa Stadium; Referee: Abdulhadi Al Rowaily

22 November 2020 Round 6	Al-Arabi	1–4	Al Sadd	Doha
18:45	Gunnarsson 74'	Soccerway report	Bounedjah 12'; Cazorla 30'; Hassan 61'; Tabata 81'	Stadium: Grand Hamad Stadium; Referee: Meshari Al shammari

27 November 2020 Round 7	Al Sadd	3–1	Umm Salal	Doha
19:45	Akram Afif 35'; Cazorla 50' (pen.); Baba Malick 90+1' (o.g.)	Soccerway report	Cheshmi 40'	Stadium: Thani bin Jassim Stadium; Referee: Khalid Ayed

8 December 2020 Round 8	Al-Wakrah	1–4	Al Sadd	Doha
18:45	Coulibaly 69'	Soccerway report	Al-Haidos 3'; Abdelkarim Hassan 14'; Bounedjah 71'; Akram Afif 77'	Stadium: Abdullah bin Khalifa Stadium; Referee: Hamad Al Subaie

13 December 2020 Round 9	Al Sadd	4–1	Al-Gharafa	Doha
17:15	Khoukhi 5'; Cazorla 63'; Akram Afif 84'; Bounedjah 90'	Soccerway report	Koo Ja-cheol 76'	Stadium: Abdullah bin Khalifa Stadium; Referee: Abdullah Al Athbah

23 December 2020 Round 10	Al-Rayyan	0–1	Al Sadd	Doha
18:30		Soccerway report	Bounedjah 83'	Stadium: Jassim Bin Hamad Stadium; Referee: Abdulhadi Al Rowaily

28 December 2020 Round 11	Qatar SC	1–1	Al Sadd	Doha
18:30	Okpotu 31'	Soccerway report	Cazorla 42' (pen.)	Stadium: Hamad bin Suhaim Al Thani; Referee: Salman Ahmad Flahi

2 January 2021 Round 12	Al Sadd	5–0	Al Kharaitiyat	Doha
16:15	Tabata 69', 78'; Assadalla 73'; Bounedjah 82', 89'	Soccerway report		Stadium: Jassim Bin Hamad Stadium; Referee: Youssef Alsharshani

7 January 2021 Round 13	Al Sadd	8–0	Al-Sailiya	Doha
16:15	Bounedjah 23', 80', 86', 89'; Nam Tae-hee 36', 54'; Assadalla 50'; Cazorla 61'	Soccerway report		Stadium: Jassim Bin Hamad Stadium; Referee: Khamis Al Marri

12 January 2021 Round 14	Al Sadd	3–1	Al-Duhail	Doha
18:45	Bounedjah 14', 50', 87'	Soccerway report	Almoez Ali 6' (pen.)	Stadium: Jassim Bin Hamad Stadium; Referee: Abdulhadi Al Rowaily

20 January 2021 Round 15	Al Sadd	7–0	Al-Khor	Doha
19:00	Bounedjah 7', 33'; Tabata 36', 48', 57'; Cazorla 41' (pen.); Assadalla 71'	Soccerway report		Stadium: Jassim Bin Hamad Stadium; Referee: Meshari Al shammari

13 February 2021 Round 16	Al Sadd	3–0	Al-Ahli	Doha
18:15	Bounedjah 23'; Khoukhi 26'; Salman 88'	Soccerway report		Stadium: Jassim Bin Hamad Stadium; Referee: Khamis Al Marri

22 February 2021 Round 17	Al Sadd	3–2	Al-Arabi	Doha
19:15	Al-Haidos 63'; Bounedjah 90'; Cazorla 90+2'	Soccerway report	Soria 10'; Msakni 77'	Stadium: Jassim Bin Hamad Stadium; Referee: Abdulrahman Al Jassim

7 March 2021 Round 18	Umm Salal	0–3	Al Sadd	Doha
19:15		Soccerway report	Bounedjah 34'; Youssef 51'; Tabata 90+2'	Stadium: Jassim Bin Hamad Stadium; Referee: Abdulhadi Al Ruaile

11 March 2021 Round 19	Al Sadd	1–1	Al-Wakrah	Doha
19:15	Tabata 25'	Soccerway report	Mazeed 84'	Stadium: Jassim Bin Hamad Stadium; Referee: Meshari Al shammari

3 April 2021 Round 20	Al-Gharafa	0–2	Al Sadd	Doha
16:00		Soccerway report	Nam Tae-hee 16'; Cazorla 65' (pen.)	Stadium: Jassim Bin Hamad Stadium; Referee: Mohamed Ahmed Al Mazid

6 April 2021 Round 21	Al Sadd	2–1	Al-Rayyan	Doha
20:30	Bounedjah 4'; Cazorla 66' (pen.)	Soccerway report	Boli 28'	Stadium: Jassim Bin Hamad Stadium; Referee: Abdulrahman Al Jassim

9 April 2021 Round 22	Al Sadd	3–0	Qatar SC	Doha
18:15	Mahmoudi 3' (o.g.); Tabata 39' (pen.); Youssef 76'	Soccerway report		Stadium: Jassim Bin Hamad Stadium; Referee: Meshari Al shammari

== 2019–20 Qatari Stars Cup ==
29 August 2020 Semi-finals	Al Ahli	0–2	Al Sadd SC	Doha
18:00		Report	Santi Cazorla 71'; Akram Afif 90+2'	Stadium: Jassim bin Hamad Stadium; Referee: Salman Ahmad Falahi

10 October 2020 Final	Al Sadd SC	4–0	Al-Arabi	Doha
17:00	Yusuf Abdurisag 17'; Nam Tae-hee 53'; Santi Cazorla 77'; Rodrigo Tabata 90+1'	Report		Stadium: Abdullah bin Khalifa Stadium; Referee: Abdulhadi Al Ruaile

== 2020 Emir of Qatar Cup ==
31 October 2020 Semi-finals	Al-Duhail	1–4	Al Sadd SC	Doha
18:00	Edmilson 10'	Report	Khoukhi 59'; Guilherme Torres 64'; Bounedjah 77'; Tabata 88'	Stadium: Abdullah bin Khalifa Stadium; Referee: Abdulrahman Al-Jassim

18 December 2020 Final	Al-Arabi	1–2	Al Sadd SC	Al Rayyan
19:00	Gunnarsson 23'	Report	Bounedjah 3', 44'	Stadium: Ahmed bin Ali Stadium; Attendance: 20,000; Referee: Saoud Al Adbah

== 2021 Emir of Qatar Cup ==
26 January 2021 Round of 16	Al Sadd	7–0	Muaither	Doha
19:15	Hashim Ali 10', 30'; Khoukhi 64'; Al Bayati 66'; Youssef 78', 90+2'; Afif 83'	Report		Stadium: Jassim bin Hamad Stadium; Referee: Moatasem Al Mazyed

3 March 2021 Quarter-finals	Al-Gharafa	0–5	Al Sadd	Doha
16:50		Report	Nam Tae-hee 25'; Bounedjah 26', 72'; Afif 45'; Youssef 80'	Stadium: Abdullah bin Khalifa Stadium; Referee: Salman Ahmad Flahi

7 May 2021 Semi-finals	Al Sadd	3–0	Al-Arabi	Doha
22:00	Nam Tae-hee 10'; Bounedjah 56'; Cazorla 80' (pen.)	Report		Stadium: Jassim bin Hamad Stadium; Attendance: 0 Referee: Abdulrahman Al Jassim

== Qatar Cup (ex) Crown Prince Cup ==
18 February 2021 Semi-finals	Al-Rayyan	0–1	Al Sadd	Doha
16:45		Report	Cazorla 84' (pen.)	Stadium: Abdullah bin Khalifa Stadium; Referee: Saoud Al Athbah

26 February 2021 Final	Al-Duhail	0–2	Al Sadd	Doha
16:45		Report	Bounedjah 9', 77'	Stadium: Abdullah bin Khalifa Stadium; Referee: Khamis Al Marri

== 2020 AFC Champions League ==
=== Group stage ===
==== Group D ====
Pos	Team	Pld	W	D	L	GF	GA	GD	Pts	Qualification	NAS	SAD	SEP	AIN
1	(Saudi Arabia) Al-Nassr	6	3	2	1	9	5	+4	11	Advance to knockout stage	—	2–2	2–0	0–1
2	(Qatar) Al-Sadd	6	2	3	1	14	8	+6	9	Advance to knockout stage	1–1	—	3–0	4–0
3	(Iran) Sepahan	6	2	1	3	6	8	−2	7		0–2	2–1	—	0–0
4	(United Arab Emirates) Al-Ain	6	1	2	3	5	13	−8	5		1–2	3–3	0–4	—

Source: AFC

15 September 2020 (Note: Due to the COVID-19 pandemic in Asia, the following matches were postponed to a later date between late February and early March: Group A: Al-Ahli v Al-Shorta and Al-Wahda v Esteghlal (2 March 2020); Group B: Al-Hilal v Pakhtakor and Shabab Al-Ahli v Shahr Khodro (3 March 2020); Group C: Persepolis v Al-Taawoun and Al-Duhail v Sharjah (2 March 2020); Group D: Al-Ain v Al-Sadd and Sepahan v Al-Nassr (3 March 2020), Al-Nassr v Sepahan (6 April 2020); Group E: FC Seoul v Chiangrai United (3 March 2020); Group F: Perth Glory v Ulsan Hyundai (18 March 2020)) (Note: On 9 July 2020, AFC announced new schedule for 2020 AFC Champions League group stage. On 16 July 2020, AFC announced that Qatar would host 2020 AFC Champions League in the West region from the group stage to the semi-finals. On 27 July 2020, AFC confirmed that Malaysia would host matches of Group G and H.) 3	Al-Ain (United Arab Emirates)	3–3	(Qatar) Al Sadd	Doha
18:00 UTC+3	Laba 5'; Islamkhan 38'; Khoukhi 67' (o.g.)	Live Report; Stats Report	Afif 35'; Cazorla 55'; Bounedjah 60'	Stadium: Jassim bin Hamad Stadium; Attendance: 0 Referee: Hettikamkanamge Perera (Sri Lanka)

18 September 2020 4	Al Sadd (Qatar)	4–0	(United Arab Emirates) Al-Ain	Doha
18:00 UTC+3	Bounedjah 26', 70'; Afif 56'; Tabata 86'	Live Report; Stats Report		Stadium: Jassim bin Hamad Stadium; Attendance: 0 Referee: Mohd Amirul Izwan Yaacob (Malaysia)

21 September 2020 5	Al Sadd (Qatar)	1–1	(Saudi Arabia) Al-Nassr	Doha
18:00 UTC+3	Bounedjah 87'	Live Report; Stats Report	Al-Ghannam 22'	Stadium: Jassim bin Hamad Stadium; Attendance: 0 Referee: Masoud Tufayelieh (Syria)

24 September 2020 6	Sepahan (Iran)	2–1	(Qatar) Al Sadd	Doha
18:00 UTC+3	Mirzaei 14'; Shahbazzadeh 53'	Live Report; Stats Report	Ali 82'	Stadium: Jassim bin Hamad Stadium; Attendance: 0 Referee: Sivakorn Pu-udom (Thailand)

=== Knockout stage ===
==== Round of 16 ====
27 September 2020	Persepolis (Iran)	1–0	(Qatar) Al Sadd SC	Doha
16:40 UTC+3	Alekasir 88'	Live Report; Stats Report		Stadium: Education City Stadium; Attendance: 0 Referee: Ko Hyung-jin (South Korea)

== 2021 AFC Champions League ==
=== Group stage ===
On 11 March 2021, AFC confirmed the hosts for the group stage, except for Group H and I whose hosts will be decided at a later date. On 10 May 2021, AFC confirmed the hosts for Group H and I.

==== Group D ====
Pos	Team	Pld	W	D	L	GF	GA	GD	Pts	Qualification	NAS	SAD	WEH	FOO
1	(Saudi Arabia) Al-Nassr (H)	6	3	2	1	9	5	+4	11	Advance to Round of 16	—	3–1	1–2	2–0
2	(Qatar) Al-Sadd	6	3	1	2	9	7	+2	10		1–2	—	3–1	1–1
3	(Jordan) Al-Wehdat	6	2	1	3	4	7	−3	7		0–0	0–2	—	1–0
4	(Iran) Foolad	6	1	2	3	3	6	−3	5		1–1	0–1	1–0	—

Source: AFC
(H) Hosts

14 April 2021 1	Al Sadd (Qatar)	1–1	(Iran) Foolad	Riyadh
21:00 UTC+3	Khoukhi 89'	Report	Chimba 61'	Stadium: King Fahd International Stadium; Attendance: 0 Referee: Masoud Tufayelieh (Syria)

17 April 2021 2	Al-Nassr (Saudi Arabia)	3–1	(Qatar) Al Sadd	Riyadh
21:00 UTC+3	Hamdallah 37'; Al-Sulayhem 79'; Al-Ghannam 90+4'	Report	Cazorla 59'	Stadium: King Saud University Stadium; Attendance: 0 Referee: Ali Sabah (Iraq)

20 April 2021 3	Al Sadd (Qatar)	3–1	(Jordan) Al-Wehdat	Riyadh
21:00 UTC+3	Bounedjah 2'; Khoukhi 9'; Al-Haydos 26'	Report	Samir 63' (pen.)	Stadium: King Fahd International Stadium; Attendance: 0 Referee: Hettikamkanamge Perera (Sri Lanka)

23 April 2021 4	Al-Wehdat (Jordan)	0–2	(Qatar) Al Sadd	Riyadh
21:00 UTC+3		Report	Cazorla 13' (pen.); Assadalla 89'	Stadium: Prince Faisal bin Fahd Stadium; Attendance: 0 Referee: Mohd Amirul Izwan Yaacob (Malaysia)

26 April 2021 5	Foolad (Iran)	0–1	(Qatar) Al Sadd	Riyadh
21:00 UTC+3		Report	Nam Tae-hee 64'	Stadium: Prince Faisal bin Fahd Stadium; Attendance: 0 Referee: Ali Shaban (Kuwait)

29 April 2021 6	Al Sadd (Qatar)	1–2	(Saudi Arabia) Al-Nassr	Riyadh
21:00 UTC+3	Cazorla 83' (pen.)	Report	Hamdallah 33'; Al-Amri 74'	Stadium: King Saud University Stadium; Attendance: 0 Referee: Masoud Tufayelieh (Syria)

== Squad information ==
=== Playing statistics ===
No.	Pos	Nat	Player	Total		Qatar Stars League		Emir of Qatar Cup		2020 AFC CL1		2021 AFC CL1		Other	
No.	Pos	Nat	Player	Apps	Goals	Apps	Goals	Apps	Goals	Apps	Goals	Apps	Goals	Apps	Goals
1	GK	(Qatar) QAT	Saad Al Sheeb	11	0	4	0	3	0	4	0	0	0	0	0
22	GK	(Qatar) QAT	Meshaal Barsham	29	0	18	0	2	0	1	0	6	0	2	0
2	DF	(Qatar) QAT	Pedro Miguel	33	0	18	0	4	0	4	0	5	0	2	0
3	DF	(Qatar) QAT	Abdelkarim Hassan	34	2	16	2	5	0	5	0	6	0	2	0
7	DF	(Qatar) QAT	Mohammed Waad	1	0	0	0	1	0	0	0	0	0	0	0
12	DF	(Qatar) QAT	Hamid Ismail	0	0	0	0	0	0	0	0	0	0	0	0
16	MF	(Qatar) QAT	Boualem Khoukhi	31	6	13	2	5	2	5	0	6	2	2	0
20	DF	(Qatar) QAT	Salem Al-Hajri	21	0	11	0	2	0	0	0	6	0	2	0
66	DF	(Qatar) QAT	Yasser Abubakar	0	0	0	0	0	0	0	0	0	0	0	0
70	DF	(Qatar) QAT	Musab Kheder	26	0	17	0	2	0	4	0	2	0	1	0
4	MF	(Qatar) QAT	Ahmed Sayyar	13	2	9	2	2	0	2	0	0	0	0	0
5	MF	(South Korea) KOR	Jung Woo-young	23	0	18	0	3	0	0	0	0	0	2	0
8	MF	(Qatar) QAT	Ali Assadalla	16	4	8	3	3	0	0	0	5	1	0	0
6	MF	(Qatar) QAT	Tarek Salman	26	1	14	1	2	0	5	0	5	0	0	0
19	MF	(South Korea) KOR	Nam Tae-hee	33	10	18	7	4	2	3	0	6	1	2	0
23	MF	(Qatar) QAT	Hashim Ali	20	5	13	2	3	2	2	1	2	0	0	0
37	MF	(Qatar) QAT	Ahmed Suhail	17	0	12	0	3	0	2	0	0	0	0	0
61	MF	(Qatar) QAT	Mostafa Tarek	0	0	0	0	0	0	0	0	0	0	0	0
27	MF	(Qatar) QAT	Youssef Abdel Razaq Youssef	30	6	17	2	4	3	3	0	5	1	1	0
7	MF	(Qatar) QAT	Mohammed Al Bayati	29	1	16	0	1	1	4	0	6	0	2	0
18	MF	(Spain) ESP	Santi Cazorla	39	21	20	13	5	1	4	1	6	3	4	3
13	MF	(Brazil) BRA	Guilherme Torres	35	2	19	1	4	1	4	0	6	0	2	0
15	MF	(Qatar) QAT	Bahaa Ellithi	6	0	4	0	1	0	1	0	0	0	0	0
9	FW	(Qatar) QAT	Abdulaziz Al Ansari	0	0	0	0	0	0	0	0	0	0	0	0
10	MF	(Qatar) QAT	Hassan Al-Haidos	33	3	18	2	3	0	4	0	6	1	2	0
11	FW	(Algeria) ALG	Baghdad Bounedjah	35	34	19	21	4	6	4	4	6	1	2	2
17	FW	(Qatar) QAT	Rodrigo Tabata	35	13	21	11	4	1	5	1	3	0	2	0
	FW	(Qatar) QAT	Hassan Palang	0	0	0	0	0	0	0	0	0	0	0	0
45	MF	(Qatar) QAT	Akram Afif	20	9	11	5	4	2	4	2	0	0	1	0
96	FW	(Qatar) QAT	Hossam Kamal	8	0	6	0	1	0	1	0	0	0	0	0
Players transferred out during the season

Last updated: 26 January 2021
Source: fr.soccerway.com

=== Goalscorers ===
Includes all competitive matches. The list is sorted alphabetically by surname when total goals are equal.

No.	Nat.	Player	Pos.	QSL	QEC	CPC	CL 1	TOTAL
11	(Algeria)	Baghdad Bounedjah	FW	21	6	2	5	34
19	(Spain)	Santi Cazorla	MF	13	1	1	3	19
12	(Qatar)	Rodrigo Tabata	FW	10	1	0	1	12
9	(South Korea)	Nam Tae-hee	MF	7	2	0	1	10
29	(Qatar)	Akram Afif	FW	5	2	0	2	9
16	(Qatar)	Boualem Khoukhi	DF	2	2	0	2	6
23	(Qatar)	Hashim Ali	MF	2	2	0	1	5
27	(Qatar)	Youssef Abdel Razaq Youssef	MF	2	3	0	0	5
8	(Qatar)	Ali Assadalla	MF	3	0	0	1	4
10	(Qatar)	Hassan Al-Haidos	FW	3	0	0	1	4
4	(Qatar)	Ahmed Sayyar	MF	2	0	0	0	2
13	(Brazil)	Guilherme Torres	MF	1	1	0	0	2
3	(Qatar)	Abdelkarim Hassan	DF	2	0	0	0	2
15	(Qatar)	Tarek Salman	MF	1	0	0	0	1
7	(Qatar)	Mohammed Al Bayati	MF	0	1	0	0	1
Own Goals				3	0	0	0	3
Totals				77	21	3	18	119

=== Assists ===
No.	Nat.	Player	Pos.	QSL	QEC	CPC	CL 1	TOTAL
18	(Spain)	Santi Cazorla	MF	11	2	1	3	17
29	(Qatar)	Akram Afif	FW	7	5	0	0	12
10	(Qatar)	Hassan Al-Haidos	FW	9	1	0	1	11
11	(Algeria)	Baghdad Bounedjah	FW	6	1	0	2	9
19	(South Korea)	Nam Tae-hee	MF	2	1	0	3	6
3	(Qatar)	Abdelkarim Hassan	DF	5	0	0	0	5
23	(Qatar)	Hashim Ali	MF	3	2	0	0	5
27	(Qatar)	Youssef Abdel Razaq Youssef	MF	2	1	0	2	5
17	(Qatar)	Rodrigo Tabata	FW	2	1	0	0	3
8	(Qatar)	Ali Assadalla	MF	3	0	0	0	3
13	(Brazil)	Guilherme Torres	MF	1	1	0	1	3
7	(Qatar)	Mohammed Al Bayati	MF	0	0	0	1	1
2	(Qatar)	Pedro Miguel	DF	1	0	0	0	1
16	(Qatar)	Boualem Khoukhi	DF	1	0	0	0	1
20	(Qatar)	Salem Al-Hajri	DF	1	0	0	0	1
Totals				48	15	1	13	77

== Transfers ==
=== In ===
Date	Pos	Player	From club	Transfer fee	Source
20 July 2020	MF	(Spain) Santi Cazorla	(Spain) Villarreal	Free transfer	
30 July 2020	FW	(Qatar) Rodrigo Tabata	Al Rayyan	Free transfer	
31 August 2020	MF	(Brazil) Guilherme Torres	(Greece) Olympiacos	Free transfer	

=== Out ===
Date	Pos	Player	to club	Transfer fee	Source
11 August 2020	MF	(Mexico) Marco Fabián	(Mexico) Juárez	Free transfer	
29 November 2020	MF	(Spain) Gabi	Retired	—N/a	
