= Guilherme Torres =

Qatari footballer (born 1991)

Personal information
- Full name: Guilherme dos Santos Torres
- Date of birth: 5 April 1991 (age 35)
- Place of birth: Santo André, Brazil
- Height: 1.78 m (5 ft 10 in)
- Position: Defensive midfielder

Team information
- Current team: Al Sadd
- Number: 18

Youth career
- 2002–2009: Portuguesa

Senior career*
Years	Team	Apps	(Gls)
2009–2012	Portuguesa	46	(4)
2012–2014	Corinthians	46	(6)
2014–2017	Udinese	39	(0)
2016–2017	→ Deportivo La Coruña (loan)	30	(2)
2017–2018	Deportivo La Coruña	31	(0)
2018–2020	Olympiacos	50	(7)
2020–	Al Sadd	87	(10)

International career^{‡}
2025–	Qatar	2	(0)
- * Club domestic league appearances and goals as of 22 November 2025 (UTC) ‡ National team caps and goals as of 9 September 2025

Guilherme dos Santos Torres (born 5 April 1991), commonly known as Guilherme, is a professional footballer who plays as a defensive midfielder of Qatar Stars League football club Al Sadd. Born in Brazil, he plays for the Qatar national team.

== Club career ==
=== Portuguesa ===
Born in Santo André, São Paulo, Guilherme Torres joined Portuguesa's youth setup in 2002 at the age of 11. He made his professional debut on 11 August 2009, starting in a 1–2 Série B away loss against Duque de Caxias. On 26 January 2011, Guilherme Torres scored his first professional goal, which came in a 1–3 home loss against Ponte Preta. He was an undisputed starter during the year's Série B winning campaign. Guilherme Torres made his Série A debut on 23 June 2012, playing the full 90 minutes in a 1–0 home win against São Paulo.

=== Corinthians ===
On 14 August 2012, after being strongly linked to Palmeiras, Guilherme Torres signed a five-year deal with Corinthians, for a R$7 million fee. He made his debut late in the month, coming on as a late substitute for Paulo André in a 1–2 home loss against São Paulo. Guilherme Torres scored his first goal for Timão, netting his team's second in a 3–1 home win against Grêmio.

=== Udinese ===
On 7 July 2014, Guilherme Torres agreed a transfer to Serie A club Udinese, signing a contract on 18 July. He made his debut in the category on 31 August, starting in a 2–0 home win against Empoli. A regular starter during the 2014–15 season, Guilherme lost his space in 2015–16 after the arrival of countryman Edenílson.

=== Deportivo La Coruña ===
On 16 July 2016, Guilherme Torres was loaned to La Liga club Deportivo de La Coruña for one year, with a buyout clause. Backed by the coaches’ trust, he went on to enjoy a brilliant first season in La Liga, becoming a regular in the Deportivo roster and convincing the Spaniards to activate his Udinese release clause of €4.5 million at the end of the season.

After being a regular starter, Dépor activated Guilherme's buy clause on 15 June 2017 and he signed a permanent four-year contract with the club.

=== Olympiacos ===
On 17 August 2018, Guilherme Torres signed a three years contract with Super League club Olympiacos after completing a €3 million transfer fee. His contract, which ran until 2021, was worth €750,000 per year. On 31 March 2019, he scored with a header his first goal for the championship from close range to convert Kostas Fortounis’s cross, in a 2–1 home win game against Atromitos.

On 8 April 2019, Guilherme Torres scored with a header after Kostas Fortounis skipped past a Panetolikos defender before crossing for the Brazilian midfielder in a 5–0 away hammering win against Panetolikos. A week later he scored a brace in a 4–0 home win game against Xanthi, the first coming in the 10th minute as the Brazilian headed in a Kostas Fortounis corner, and the second six minutes later as he side-footed home from Omar Elabdellaoui’s cross with a shell-shocked Xanthi struggling to contain the in-form home side.

=== Al Sadd ===
On 31 August 2020, Guilherme Torres joined Qatari club, Al Sadd for a transfer fee at the range of €6 million.

== International career ==
Guilherme Torres made his debut for the Qatar national team on 3 September 2025 in a 2–2 friendly game draw against Bahrain.

== Career statistics ==
As of match played 21 January 2022

Club	Season	League			State League		Cup		Continental		Total	
Club	Season	Division	Apps	Goals	Apps	Goals	Apps	Goals	Apps	Goals	Apps	Goals
Portuguesa	2009	Série B	2	0	0	0	0	0	—		2	0
Portuguesa	2010	Série B	3	0	1	0	0	0	—		4	0
Portuguesa	2011	Série B	35	4	14	1	1	0	—		50	5
Portuguesa	2012	Série A	6	0	16	1	5	0	—		27	1
Portuguesa	Total		46	4	31	2	6	0	0	0	83	6
Corinthians	2012	Série A	14	2	—		—		—		14	2
Corinthians	2013	Série A	27	3	12	1	1	0	2 (Note: Appearances in Recopa Sudamericana)	0	42	4
Corinthians	2014	Série A	5	1	14	2	2	0	—		21	3
Corinthians	Total		46	6	26	3	3	0	2	0	77	9
Udinese	2014–15	Serie A	34	0	—		3	0	—		37	0
Udinese	2015–16	Serie A	5	0	—		2	1	—		7	1
Udinese	Total		39	0	—		5	1	0	0	44	1
Deportivo	2016–17	La Liga	30	2	—		4	0	—		34	2
Deportivo	2017–18	La Liga	31	0	—		2	0	—		33	0
Deportivo	Total		61	2	—		6	0	0	0	67	2
Olympiacos	2018–19	Super League Greece	23	4	—		5	0	5 (Note: Appearances in UEFA Europa League)	0	33	4
Olympiacos	2019–20	Super League Greece	27	3	—		3	1	15	2	45	5
Olympiacos	Total		50	7	—		8	1	20	2	78	9
Al Sadd	2020–21	Qatar Stars League	19	1	—		6 (Note: Appearances in Qatar Cup)	0	4 (Note: Appearances in AFC Champions League)	0	29	1
Al Sadd	2021–22	Qatar Stars League	11	1	—		0	0	0	0	11	1
Al Sadd	Total		30	2	—		6	0	4	0	40	2
Career total			272	19	57	5	34	2	26	2	398	29

== Honours ==
=== Club ===
Olympiacos

- Super League Greece: 2019–20
- Greek Cup: 2019–20

Al Sadd

- Qatar Stars League: 2020–21, 2021–22 2023–24
- Emir of Qatar Cup: 2020, 2021, 2024
- Qatari Stars Cup: 2019–20
- Qatar Cup: 2021

=== Individual ===
- Super League Greece Team of the Season: 2018–19
