= Saad Al-Sheeb =

Qatari footballer (born 1990)

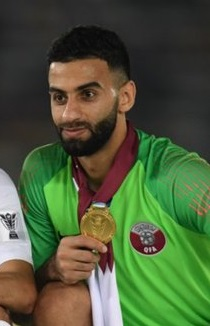
- Al Sheeb celebrating the 2019 AFC Asian Cup win with Qatar

Personal information
- Full name: Saad Abdullah Mohammed Ebrahim Al-Sheeb
- Date of birth: 19 February 1990 (age 36)
- Place of birth: Doha, Qatar
- Height: 1.88 m (6 ft 2 in)
- Position: Goalkeeper

Team information
- Current team: Al Sadd
- Number: 1

Youth career
- 2002–2008: Al Sadd

Senior career*
Years	Team	Apps	(Gls)
2008–	Al Sadd	206	(0)

International career^{‡}
2009–	Qatar	84	(0)
Medal record
Representing Qatar
Men's football
AFC Asian Cup
Winner	2019
Winner	2023
WAFF Championship
Winner	2013
Arabian Gulf Cup
Winner	2014
FIFA Arab Cup
Third place	2021
- * Club domestic league appearances and goals as of 17 January 2026 ‡ National team caps and goals as of 7 January 2024

Saad Abdullah Mohammed Ebrahim Al-Sheeb (Arabic: سعد الشيب; born 19 February 1990) is a Qatari professional footballer who plays as a goalkeeper for Qatar Stars League club Al Sadd and the Qatar national team.

== International career ==
He made his debut for the senior national team of Qatar in 2009.

He was a part of the 23-man Qatar squad that was crowned champions of the 2019 AFC Asian Cup. With Al-Sheeb starting in all of Qatar's seven matches, the team conceded only a single goal, resulting in him winning the 'Best Goalkeeper Award'.

== Honours ==
Al-Sadd

- Qatar Stars League: 2012–13, 2018–19, 2020–21, 2021–22, 2023–24, 2024–25, 2025–26
- Emir of Qatar Cup: 2014, 2015, 2017, 2020, 2021, 2024
- Qatar Cup: 2008, 2017, 2020, 2021
- Sheikh Jassim Cup: 2014, 2017, 2019
- Qatari Stars Cup: 2010, 2019–20
- AFC Champions League: 2011
- Qatar-UAE Super Shield: 2026
- FIFA Club World Cup Third place: 2011

Qatar

- AFC Asian Cup: 2019, 2023
- Arabian Gulf Cup: 2014
- WAFF Championship: 2013

Individual

- AFC Asian Cup Golden Glove: 2019
- AFC Asian Cup Team of the Tournament: 2019
- Qatar Stars League Team of the Year: 2017–18, 2018–19
