= Ali Assadalla =

Qatari footballer (born 1993)

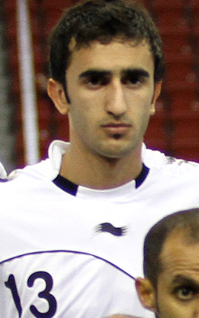
- Ali Asad in 2012

Personal information
- Full name: Ali Assadalla Qambar
- Date of birth: 19 January 1993 (age 33)
- Place of birth: Manama, Bahrain
- Height: 1.74 m (5 ft 9 in)
- Position: Midfielder

Team information
- Current team: Al Sadd
- Number: 8

Youth career
- 2007–2008: Al Muharraq
- 2008–2012: Al Sadd

Senior career*
Years	Team	Apps	(Gls)
2012–	Al Sadd	207	(26)

International career^{‡}
2010–2013	Qatar U20	9	(0)
2013–2014	Qatar B	5	(1)
2013–	Qatar	65	(12)
Medal record
Men's football
Representing Qatar
AFC Asian Cup
Winner	2023 Qatar
FIFA Arab Cup
Third place	2021 Qatar
- * Club domestic league appearances and goals as of 17 January 2026 ‡ National team caps and goals as of 7 January 2024 (UTC)

Ali Assadalla Qambar (Arabic: علي أسد الله; born 19 January 1993), also known simply as Ali Asad, is a professional footballer who plays as a midfielder for Al Sadd. Born in Bahrain, he represents the Qatar national team.

== International career ==
Assadalla was born in Bahrain, but was naturalized as Qatari. He was called up to the Qatar B team on 13 November 2013. He made his official debut for the team on 25 December in the 2014 WAFF Championship in a 1–0 win against Palestine. He played in all of Qatar's matches in the tournament, scoring a goal against Kuwait during extra time in the semi-final. He formed a prolific partnership with Boualem Khoukhi, who won the top scorer award, throughout the tournament. This culminated in his team defeating Jordan in the finals and claiming its maiden WAFF title, in addition to Asad being declared 'Best Player of the Tournament'.

== Career statistics ==
Scores and results list Qatar's goal tally first.

#	Date	Venue	Opponent	Score	Result	Competition
1.	4 January 2014	Abdullah bin Khalifa Stadium, Doha, Qatar	Kuwait	3–0	3–0	2014 WAFF Championship
2.	23 November 2014	King Fahd International Stadium, Riyadh, Saudi Arabia	Oman	2–1	3–1	22nd Arabian Gulf Cup
3.	23 November 2014	King Fahd International Stadium, Riyadh, Saudi Arabia	Oman	3–1	3–1	22nd Arabian Gulf Cup
4.	26 March 2015	Abdullah bin Khalifa Stadium, Doha, Qatar	Algeria	1–0	1–0	Friendly
5.	3 September 2015	Jassim Bin Hamad Stadium, Doha, Qatar	Bhutan	3–0	15–0	2018 FIFA World Cup qualification
6.	3 September 2015	Jassim Bin Hamad Stadium, Doha, Qatar	Bhutan	8–0	15–0	2018 FIFA World Cup qualification
7.	3 September 2015	Jassim Bin Hamad Stadium, Doha, Qatar	Bhutan	12–0	15–0	2018 FIFA World Cup qualification
8.	13 November 2015	Abdullah bin Khalifa Stadium, Doha, Qatar	Turkey	1–0	1–2	Friendly
9.	8 August 2016	Jassim Bin Hamad Stadium, Doha, Qatar	Iraq	2–0	2–1	Friendly
10.	9 March 2017	Jassim Bin Hamad Stadium, Doha, Qatar	Azerbaijan	1–1	1–2	Friendly
11.	16 August 2017	St George's Park National Football Centre, Burton, England	Andorra	1–0	1–0	Friendly
12.	31 August 2017	Hang Jebat Stadium, Malacca, Malaysia	Syria	1–1	1–3	2018 FIFA World Cup qualification
Correct as of 31 August 2017

== Honours ==
Al-Sadd

- Qatar Stars League: 2012–13, 2018–19, 2020–21, 2021–22
- Qatar Cup: 2017, 2020, 2021
- Emir of Qatar Cup: 2014, 2015, 2017, 2020, 2021
- Qatari Stars Cup: 2010, 2019-20
- Sheikh Jassim Cup: 2014, 2017, 2019
- AFC Champions League: 2011
- FIFA Club World Cup Third-place: 2011

Qatar B

- WAFF Championship: 2014

Qatar

- Arabian Gulf Cup: 2014
- AFC Asian Cup: 2023

=== Individual ===
- WAFF Championship MVP: 2014
