= Tarek Salman =

Qatari footballer (born in Egypt 1997)

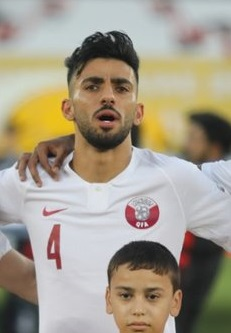
- Salman with Qatar at the 2019 AFC Asian Cup

Personal information
- Full name: Tarek Salman Suleiman Odeh
- Date of birth: 5 December 1997 (age 28)
- Place of birth: Al Wakrah, Qatar
- Height: 1.79 m (5 ft 10 in)
- Position: Center-back

Team information
- Current team: Al Sadd
- Number: 5

Youth career
- Al-Wakrah
- Lekhwiya
- Real Sociedad
- Alavés

Senior career*
| Years | Team | Apps | (Gls) |
| 2016–2017 | Júpiter Leonés | 10 | (0) |
| 2017–2018 | → Atlético Astorga (loan) | 2 | (0) |
| 2018– | Al Sadd | 128 | (2) |

International career^{‡}
| 2013–2017 | Qatar U20 | 10 | (0) |
| 2016–2020 | Qatar U23 | 12 | (0) |
| 2017– | Qatar | 96 | (0) |
Medal record
Representing Qatar
AFC Asian Cup
| Winner | UAE 2019 | Team |
| Winner | Qatar 2023 | Team |
FIFA Arab Cup
| Third place | Qatar 2021 | Team |
- * Club domestic league appearances and goals as of 17 January 2026 ‡ National team caps and goals as of 7 December 2025 (UTC)

Tarek Salman Suleiman Odeh (Arabic: طَارِق سَلْمَان سُلَيْمَان عَوْدَة; born 5 December 1997) is a Qatari professional footballer who plays as a center-back for Qatar Stars League side Al Sadd and the Qatar national team.

== Career ==
Tarek started off his youth career in his home-city; Al-Wakrah SC, in which he led the team as a striker. Later on, he joined Aspire Academy in the 2008–09 season and excelled as defender. During his youth career, he played in Qatar for Lekhwiya. He later trained in Spain with Deportivo Alavés as well as Real Sociedad C in his youth years.

In November 2016, Salman started his senior career, joining Spanish side Cultural Leonesa. He joined Tercera División club Atlético Astorga in 2017. He featured in a league match against Almazán on 23 September 2017 which ended in a 1–1 draw.

== International career ==
He appeared in one match for Qatar's youth team in the 2015 FIFA U-20 World Cup.

== Honours ==
=== Club ===
Al-Sadd

- Qatar Stars League: 2018–19, 2020-21, 2021-22
- Qatar Cup: 2020, 2021
- Emir of Qatar Cup: 2020 Emir of Qatar Cup, 2021 Emir of Qatar Cup
- Qatari Stars Cup: 2019-20 Qatari Stars Cup

=== International ===
Qatar

- AFC Asian Cup: 2019, 2023
