= Pedro Miguel (footballer) =

Portuguese-Qatari footballer (born 1990)

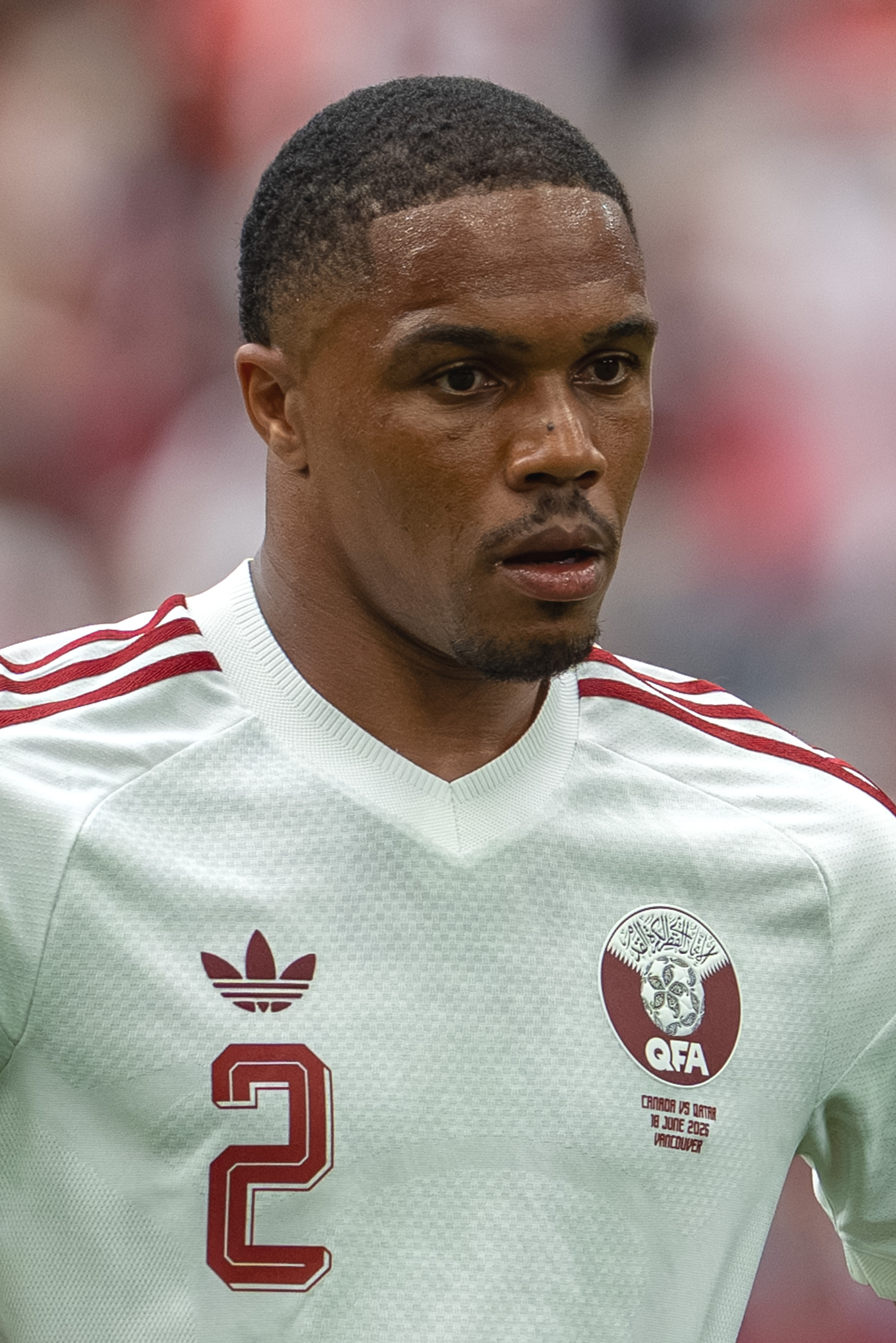
- Pedro Miguel with Qatar in 2026

Personal information
- Full name: Pedro Miguel Carvalho Deus Correia
- Date of birth: 6 August 1990 (age 36)
- Place of birth: Algueirão–Mem Martins, Portugal
- Height: 1.80 m (5 ft 11 in)
- Position: Defender

Team information
- Current team: Al Sadd
- Number: 2

Youth career
- 1998–2000: Mem Martins
- 2000–2005: Benfica
- 2006: Estrela Amadora
- 2006–2007: Estoril
- 2007–2009: Farense

Senior career*
Years	Team	Apps	(Gls)
2009–2010	Farense	18	(4)
2010	Aljustrelense	8	(1)
2011–2016	Al Ahli	58	(2)
2016–	Al Sadd	173	(10)

International career^{‡}
2009	Cape Verde U21	5	(0)
2016–	Qatar	112 (Note: According to RSSSF, Pedro Miguel featured in 117 international matches.)	(3)
Medal record
Representing Qatar
AFC Asian Cup
Winner	UAE 2019	Team
Winner	Qatar 2023	Team
FIFA Arab Cup
Third place	Qatar 2021	Team
- * Club domestic league appearances and goals as of 00:28, 4 October 2026 (UTC) ‡ National team caps and goals as of 00:28, 4 October 2026 (UTC)

Pedro Miguel Carvalho Deus Correia (Arabic: بيدرو ميغيل كارفاليو ديوس كورييا; born 6 August 1990), known as Pedro Miguel and also Ró-Ró (Arabic: رُو رُو), is a professional footballer who plays for Al Sadd and the Qatar national team as a right-back or a central defender.

Having played lower-league football in Portugal, he appeared for Al Ahli and Al Sadd in the Qatar Stars League after arriving in the country in January 2011. He won several honours with the latter, including six league titles.

Born in Portugal, Pedro Miguel represented Cape Verde and Qatar at under-21 and senior levels, respectively. He was part of the squads at the 2019 and 2023 Asian Cups, 2019 Copa América, 2021 Gold Cup and two FIFA World Cups, winning the first two tournaments.

== Club career ==
Born in Algueirão–Mem Martins, Sintra, Portugal of Cape Verdean descent, Pedro Miguel received his nickname of Ró-Ró in tribute to his idols, the Brazilian internationals Ronaldo and Romário. He played for several clubs as a youth, including Benfica where he spent nearly six seasons, and made his senior debut with Farense in the fourth division in 2009; he switched the following season to another team in that tier, Aljustrelense.

In January 2011, Ró-Ró left his country of birth and signed for Al Ahli in Qatar. He scored his first goal against Al Kharaitiyat on 7 January 2012, but in a 4–2 loss.

Pedro Miguel appeared in only six matches in his first full season, and the Doha-based side was also relegated from the Stars League. He joined Al Sadd of the same league in 2016 and, upon his arrival, revealed his interest in playing for the Qatar national team. He netted for the first time in the league for the Jesualdo Ferreira-led squad on 12 December of that year, contributing to an 8–0 home demolition of Umm Salal.

At the 2019 FIFA Club World Cup on home soil, Pedro Miguel scored in extra time as Al Sadd won 3–1 against New Caledonia's Hienghène Sport in the first round. Playing in an attacking formation under former teammate Xavi, he was a league winner again in 2020–21, in addition to winning two national cups.

== International career ==
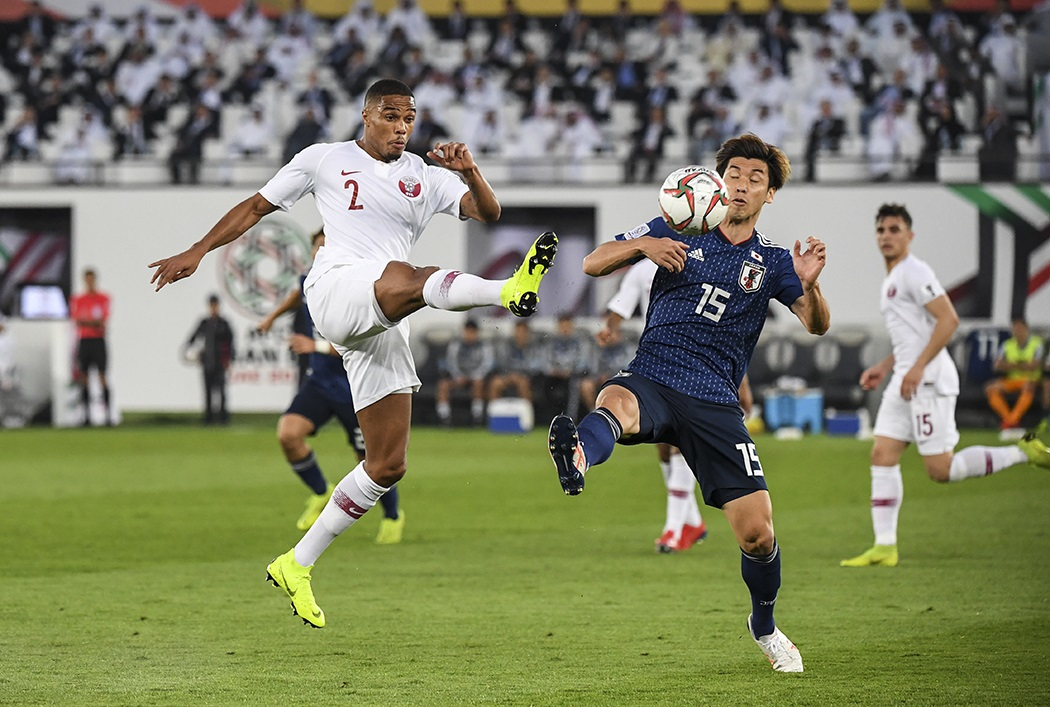
Pedro Miguel (left) in action for Qatar against Japan at the 2019 Asian Cup Final

Pedro Miguel appeared for the Cape Verde national under-21 team on 24 March 2009, playing in a 2–0 friendly away loss to Portugal. He also represented the nation at the 2009 Lusofonia Games tournament, where his team won the gold medal.

On 29 March 2016, Ró-Ró made his debut for Qatar, starting in a 2–0 defeat in China for the 2018 FIFA World Cup qualifiers. On 23 December 2017, he scored his first goal to conclude a 4–0 victory over Yemen at the 23rd Arabian Gulf Cup; the side exited in the group stage in Kuwait. He played all the matches at the 2019 AFC Asian Cup, as the tournament ended in triumph in the United Arab Emirates.

Pedro Miguel was also called up for the country's guest appearances at the 2019 Copa América and the 2021 CONCACAF Gold Cup, reaching the semi-finals of the latter. At the inaugural FIFA Arab Cup, in which Qatar came third on home turf that December, his campaign ended with a first-half injury against Oman in the second group game.

Coach Félix Sánchez called up Ró-Ró for Qatar's hosting of the 2022 FIFA World Cup. He made three starts for the hosts, who finished bottom of their group.

On 3 January 2024, Pedro Miguel was included in the 2023 Asian Cup squad. In the quarter-finals against Uzbekistan, he scored the decisive penalty in the 2–1 shoot-out win following a 1–1 draw.

Pedro Miguel was selected for the 2026 World Cup.

=== International goals ===
As of 14 October 2025
Scores and results list Qatar's goal tally first, score column indicates score after each Pedro Miguel goal.

No	Date	Venue	Opponent	Score	Result	Competition
1.	23 December 2017	Al Kuwait Sports Club, Kuwait City, Kuwait	Yemen	4–0	4–0	23rd Arabian Gulf Cup
2.	5 June 2025	Jassim bin Hamad Stadium, Al Rayyan, Qatar	Iran	1–0	1–0	2026 FIFA World Cup qualification
3.	14 October 2025	Jassim bin Hamad Stadium, Al Rayyan, Qatar	United Arab Emirates	2–0	2–1	2026 FIFA World Cup qualification

== Honours ==
Al Ahli

- Qatari Second Division: 2012–13

Al Sadd

- Qatar Stars League: 2018–19, 2020–21, 2021–22, 2023–24, 2024–25, 2025–26
- Qatar Cup: 2017, 2020, 2021
- Emir of Qatar Cup: 2017, 2020, 2021
- Sheikh Jassim Cup: 2017, 2019
- Qatari Stars Cup: 2019–20

Cape Verde U21

- Lusofonia Games: 2009

Qatar

- AFC Asian Cup: 2019, 2023

== See also ==
- List of men's footballers with 100 or more international caps
