= Jung Woo-young =

South Korean footballer (born 1989)

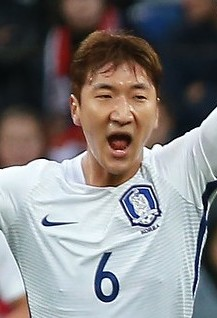
- Jung with South Korea in 2017

Personal information
- Full name: Jung Woo-young
- Date of birth: 14 December 1989 (age 36)
- Place of birth: Ulsan, South Korea
- Height: 1.86 m (6 ft 1 in)
- Positions: Defensive midfielder; centre-back

Team information
- Current team: Kataller Toyama
- Number: 20

Youth career
- 2005–2007: Haksung High School

College career
Years	Team	Apps	(Gls)
2008–2010	Kyung Hee University		

Senior career*
Years	Team	Apps	(Gls)
2011–2013	Kyoto Sanga	64	(2)
2013	→ Júbilo Iwata (loan)	13	(0)
2014–2015	Vissel Kobe	65	(3)
2016–2017	Chongqing Lifan	51	(3)
2018	Vissel Kobe	12	(2)
2018–2023	Al-Sadd	95	(3)
2023–2024	Al-Khaleej	31	(1)
2024–2025	Ulsan HD	25	(0)
2026–	Kataller Toyama	17	(2)

International career^{‡}
2010–2012	South Korea U23	9	(0)
2015–2024	South Korea	76	(3)
Medal record
Olympic Games
Bronze medal – third place	2012 London	Team
Korean name
Hangul	정우영
Hanja	鄭又榮
RR	Jeong Uyeong
MR	Chŏng Uyŏng
IPA	[tɕʌŋ.u.jʌŋ]
- * Club domestic league appearances and goals as of 16 August 2026 ‡ National team caps and goals as of 10 September 2024

Jung Woo-young (Korean: 정우영; born 14 December 1989) is a South Korean professional footballer who plays as a defensive midfielder or a centre-back for Kataller Toyama. He was part of the South Korean team that won bronze at the 2012 Summer Olympics.

== Career ==
In May 2018 he was named in South Korea's preliminary 28-man squad for the 2018 FIFA World Cup in Russia.

In December 2022 he was named for South Korea's World Cup squad, starting all 4 of their games.

On 20 July 2023, Jung Woo-young joined Saudi Professional League side Al-Khaleej on a free transfer.

== Career statistics ==
=== Club ===
As of 30 August 2025

Appearances and goals by club, season and competition
Club	Season	League			National cup		League cup		Continental		Other (Note: Includes Promotion Playoffs to J1, Qatari Super Cup, Qatar Cup and FIFA Club World Cup)		Total	
Club	Season	Division	Apps	Goals	Apps	Goals	Apps	Goals	Apps	Goals	Apps	Goals	Apps	Goals
Kyoto Sanga	2011	J2 League	31	1	5	0	—		—		—		36	1
Kyoto Sanga	2012	J2 League	34	1	1	0	—		—		1	0	36	1
Júbilo Iwata (loan)	2013	J1 League	13	0	2	0	5	0	—		—		20	0
Vissel Kobe	2014	J1 League	33	3	0	0	8	1	—		—		41	4
Vissel Kobe	2015	J1 League	32	0	0	0	6	1	—		—		38	1
Chongqing Lifan	2016	Chinese Super League	30	1	0	0	—		—		—		30	1
Chongqing Lifan	2017	Chinese Super League	21	2	0	0	—		—		—		21	2
Vissel Kobe	2018	J1 League	12	2	0	0	0	0	—		—		12	2
Al-Sadd	2017–18	Qatar Stars League	—		—		—		4 (Note: Appearances in AFC Champions League (Elite))	0	—		4	0
Al-Sadd	2018–19	Qatar Stars League	17	3	3	0	0	0	12	0	1	0	33	3
Al-Sadd	2019–20	Qatar Stars League	21	0	4	0	4	0	2	0	5	0	36	0
Al-Sadd	2020–21	Qatar Stars League	18	0	4	0	1	0	0	0	2	0	25	0
Al-Sadd	2021–22	Qatar Stars League	21	0	2	0	0	0	4	0	0	0	27	0
Al-Sadd	2022–23	Qatar Stars League	18	0	2	0	3	0	—		1	1	24	1
Al-Khaleej	2023–24	Saudi Pro League	31	1	4	1	—		—		—		35	2
Ulsan HD	2024	K League 1	8	0	3	0	—		3	0	—		14	0
Ulsan HD	2025	K League 1	12	0	1	0	—		1	0	2	0	16	0
Career total			352	14	31	1	27	2	26	0	12	1	448	18

=== International ===
Scores and results list South Korea's goal tally first.

No	Date	Venue	Opponent	Score	Result	Competition
1.	16 December 2017	Ajinomoto Stadium, Tokyo, Japan	Japan	2–1	4–1	2017 EAFF Championship
2.	12 October 2018	Seoul World Cup Stadium, Seoul, South Korea	Uruguay	2–1	2–1	Friendly
3.	10 September 2019	Köpetdag Stadium, Ashgabat, Turkmenistan	Turkmenistan	2–0	2–0	2022 FIFA World Cup qualification

== Honours ==
Al-Sadd

- Qatar Stars League: 2018–19, 2020–21, 2021–22
- Emir of Qatar Cup: 2020, 2021
- Sheikh Jassem Cup: 2019
- Qatar Cup: 2020, 2021
- Qatari Stars Cup: 2019-20

Ulsan HD

- K League 1: 2024

South Korea U23

- Olympic Bronze Medal: 2012

South Korea

- EAFF East Asian Cup: 2015, 2017

Individual

- J2/J3 100 Year Vision League (West-A) Best XI: 2026
