= 2019 Sheikh Jassim Cup =

Al Sadd	Al-Duhail
QSL	Emir of Qatar Cup
1	0
- Date: 17 August 2019
- Venue: Jassim Bin Hamad Stadium, Doha
- Referee: Saoud Al Athbah

The 2019 Sheikh Jassim Cup was the 41st edition of the cup competition for football teams from Qatar. It was changed from a group staged pre-season tournament featuring all Qatari Stars League sides, to a one-off match between the previous seasons Qatar Stars League winners and Emir of Qatar Cup winners.

== Match details ==
17 August 2019
19:15

Al Sadd	1–0	Al-Duhail
Assadalla 14'	Report

Jassim Bin Hamad Stadium, Doha
Referee: Saoud Al Athbah

Al Sadd	Al-Duhail SC

Formation: 4–4–2
GK	1	(Qatar) Saad Al Sheeb
DF	2	(Qatar) Pedro Miguel
DF	3	(Qatar) Abdelkarim Hassan
DF	20	(Qatar) Salem Al-Hajri	(substituted off) 75'
MF	23	(Qatar) Hashim Ali	(substituted off) 61'
MF	16	(Qatar) Boualem Khoukhi
MF	5	(South Korea) Jung Woo-young
MF	14	(Spain) Gabi
MF	10	(Qatar) Hassan Al-Haidos
MF	8	(Qatar) Ali Assadalla
FW	78	(Qatar) Akram Afif
Substitutes
FW	9	(Qatar) Abdulaziz Al-Ansari	(substituted on) 75'
MF	19	(South Korea) Nam Tae-hee	(substituted on) 61'
Manager
(Spain) Xavi

Formation: 4–4–2
GK	40	(Qatar) Amine Lecomte
DF	14	(Qatar) Ali Jasimi	(substituted off) 70'
DF	5	(Qatar) Bassam Al-Rawi
MF	7	(Qatar) Ismaeel Mohammad
MF	8	(Qatar) Luiz Júnior	(yellow card) 27' (yellow-red card) 68'
MF	12	(Qatar) Karim Boudiaf
FW	9	(Iraq) Mohanad Ali	(substituted off) 87'
MF	17	(Belgium) Edmilson Junior
MF	15	(Qatar) Assim Madibo	(yellow card) 73' (yellow-red card) 90+4'
MF	20	(Qatar) Ali Afif
FW	28	(Tunisia) Youssef Msakni
Substitutes
FW	11	(Qatar) Mohammed Muntari	(substituted on) 70'
DF	14	(Qatar) Fahad Al-Keldi	(substituted on) 87'
Manager
(Portugal) Rui Faria

Man of the Match:
()

Assistant referees:
Ramzan Al-Naimi
Faisal al-Shammari
Fourth official:
Abdul Hadi Rwaili
Additional assistant referees:

Match rules

- 90 minutes.
- Penalty shoot-out if scores still level.
- Seven named substitutes, of which up to three may be used.
