= Mohsen Al-Yazidi =

Qatari footballer (born 1987)

Personal information
- Full name: Mohsen Hassan Al-Yazidi
- Date of birth: 25 February 1987 (age 39)
- Place of birth: Qatar
- Height: 1.54 m (5 ft 1/2 in)
- Position: Winger

Team information
- Current team: Al-Waab
- Number: 27

Senior career*
Years	Team	Apps	(Gls)
2007–2011	Al-Arabi		
2011–2015	Al-Gharafa	18	(0)
2015–2020	Al Ahli	73	(3)
2020–2024	Al-Shamal	34	(4)
2024–2025	Al Kharaitiyat	13	(2)
2025–	Al-Waab	3	(0)
- * Club domestic league appearances and goals

Mohsen Al-Yazidi (Arabic: محسن اليزيدي ) (born 25 February 1987) is a Qatari footballer. He plays as a winger for Al-Waab.
