= Khaled Mahmoudi =

Iranian footballer (born 1993)

Personal information
- Full name: Khaled Ahmed Mahmoudi
- Date of birth: 22 March 1993 (age 33)
- Place of birth: Dashti, Hormozgan, Iran
- Height: 1.81 m (5 ft 11 1/2 in)
- Positions: Left back; center back

Team information
- Current team: Al-Khor (on loan from Al-Shamal)
- Number: 12

Youth career
- Qatar

Senior career*
Years	Team	Apps	(Gls)
2013–2025	Qatar	134	(5)
2025–	Al-Shamal	0	(0)
2025–	→ Al-Khor (loan)	3	(0)
- * Club domestic league appearances and goals

Khaled Mahmoudi (Arabic: خالد محمودي; born 22 March 1993) is a Qatari footballer who currently plays for Al-Khor, on loan from Al-Shamal as a defender or left back.
