= Yusuf Abdurisag =

Qatari footballer (born 1999)

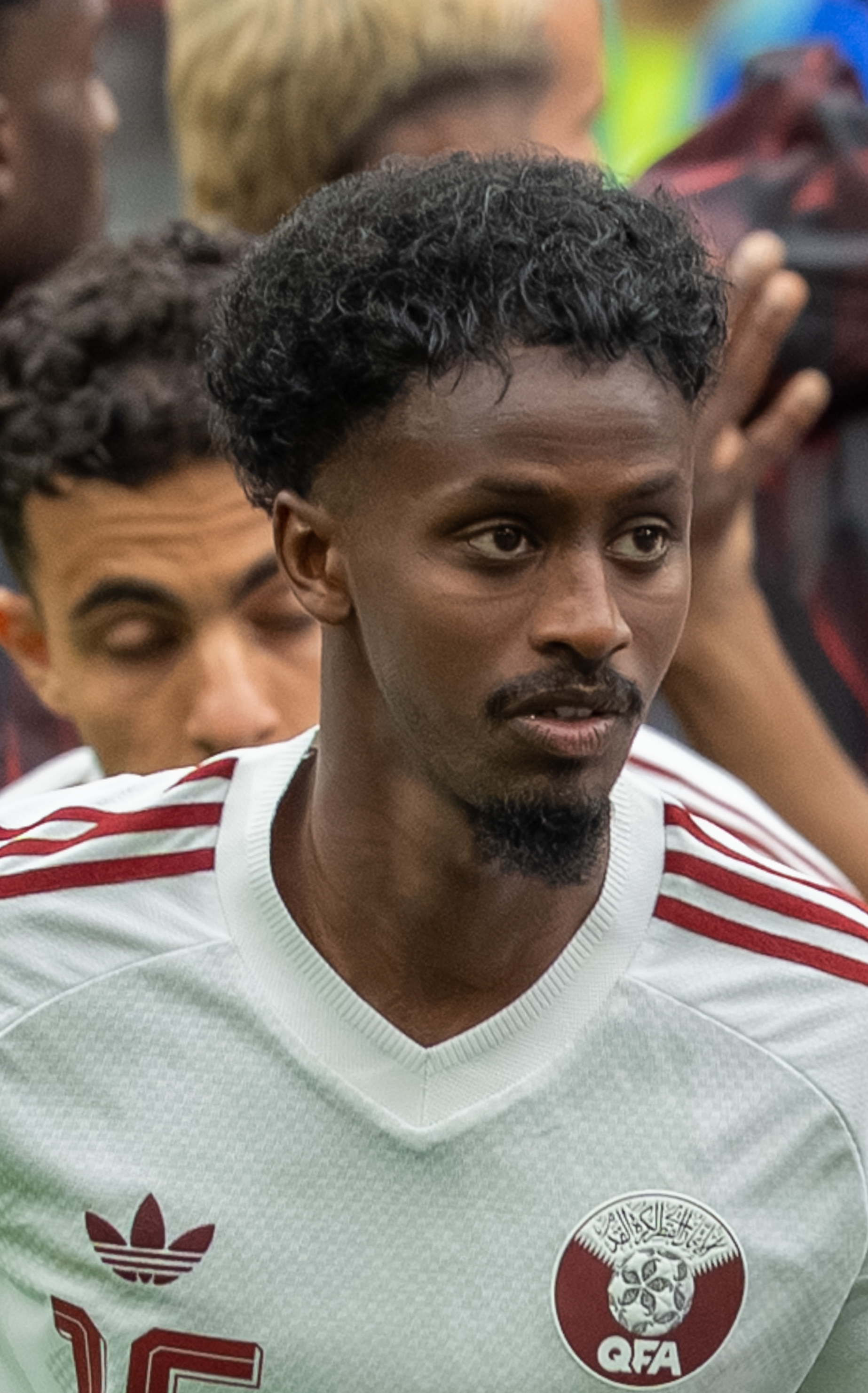
- Abdurisag with Qatar in 2026

Personal information
- Full name: Yusuf Abdurisag Yusuf
- Date of birth: 6 August 1999 (age 27)
- Place of birth: Mogadishu, Somalia
- Height: 1.77 m (5 ft 10 in)
- Position: Winger

Team information
- Current team: Al-Wakrah (on loan from Al Sadd)
- Number: 13

Youth career
- Aspire Academy

Senior career*
| Years | Team | Apps | (Gls) |
| 2018– | Al Sadd | 69 | (10) |
| 2019–2020 | → Al-Arabi (loan) | 23 | (0) |
| 2023 | → Al-Wakrah (loan) | 13 | (5) |
| 2025– | → Al-Wakrah (loan) | 9 | (0) |

International career^{‡}
| 2019 | Qatar U20 | 3 | (0) |
| 2019–2021 | Qatar U21 | 4 | (0) |
| 2018–2022 | Qatar U23 | 14 | (4) |
| 2019– | Qatar | 48 | (4) |
Medal record
Representing Qatar
Men's Football
AFC Asian Cup
| Winner | 2023 Qatar |
- * Club domestic league appearances and goals as of 17 January 2026 ‡ National team caps and goals as of 27 September 2026

Yusuf Abdurisag Yusuf (Somali: Yusuf Abdirisaq Yusuf, born 6 August 1999) is a professional footballer who plays as a winger for Qatar Stars League side Al-Wakrah, on loan from Al Sadd. Born in Somalia, he plays for the Qatar national team.

== Club career ==
Abdurisag lived in Örebro, Sweden until he was 13 years old when he moved to Qatar and Aspire Academy.

Abdurisag began his professional career with Al Sadd SC in 2018. In January 2019 he was loaned to Al-Arabi SC and returned in August 2020. In January 2023 he joined Al-Wakrah SC.

== International career ==
In June 2023, during an international friendly against New Zealand, Abdurisag was accused of racially abusing Michael Boxall. The match was subsequently abandoned when the New Zealand players refused to return after half-time in protest at referee Manuel Schuttengruber's response to the alleged incident. Abdurisag denied the accusation.

== Career statistics ==
=== International ===
As of matches played 27 September 2026

| National team | Year | Apps | Goals |
|---|---|---|---|
| Qatar | 2019 | 7 | 1 |
| Qatar | 2020 | 1 | 0 |
| Qatar | 2021 | 5 | 0 |
| Qatar | 2022 | 1 | 0 |
| Qatar | 2023 | 14 | 2 |
| Qatar | 2024 | 11 | 0 |
| Qatar | 2025 | 3 | 0 |
| Qatar | 2026 | 6 | 1 |
| Total | | 48 | 4 |

Scores and results list Qatar's goal tally first, score column indicates score after each Abdurisag goal.

List of international goals scored by Yusuf Adburisag
| No. | Date | Venue | Opponent | Score | Result | Competition |
|---|---|---|---|---|---|---|
| 1 | 10 October 2019 | Bangabandhu National Stadium, Dhaka, Bangladesh | Bangladesh | 1–0 | 2–0 | 2022 FIFA World Cup qualification |
| 2 | 25 June 2023 | NRG Stadium, Houston, United States | Haiti | 1–0 | 1–2 | 2023 CONCACAF Gold Cup |
| 3 | 21 November 2023 | Kalinga Stadium, Bhubaneswar, India | India | 3–0 | 3–0 | 2026 FIFA World Cup qualification |
| 4 | 27 September 2026 | King Abdullah Sports City Stadium, Jeddah, Saudi Arabia | Yemen | 1–0 | 1–0 | 27th Arabian Gulf Cup |

== Honours ==
Al-Sadd

- Qatar Stars League: 2020–21, 2021–22
- Qatar Cup: 2021
- Emir of Qatar Cup: 2020, 2021
- Qatari Stars Cup: 2019–20

Qatar

- AFC Asian Cup: 2023
