= Ali Qadry =

Qatari footballer (born 1994)

Ali Qaderi
Personal information
- Full name: Ali Ahmed Qaderi
- Date of birth: 20 February 1994 (age 32)
- Place of birth: Qatar
- Height: 1.75 m (5 ft 9 in)
- Position: Midfielder

Youth career
- ASPIRE

Senior career*
Years	Team	Apps	(Gls)
2011–2025	Al Ahli	204	(6)
2019–2020	→ Al-Khor (loan)	2	(0)
2024–2025	→ Al-Rayyan (loan)	8	(0)
2025–2026	Al-Shamal	0	(0)
- * Club domestic league appearances and goals

Ali Qaderi (Arabic: علي قادري; born 2 February 1994) is a Qatari footballer who plays as a midfielder.
