= Al Dokali Al Seyed =

Libyan footballer (born 1993)

دوكالي الصيد
Personal information
- Full name: Al Dokali Al Sayed Al Bouri
- Date of birth: 20 December 1993 (age 32)
- Place of birth: Libya
- Height: 1.75 m (5 ft 9 in)
- Position: Midfielder

Senior career*
Years	Team	Apps	(Gls)
2013–2015	El Jaish		
2015–2017	Al-Wakrah	7	(0)
2017–2020	Al-Rayyan	8	(0)
2019–2020	→ Al-Shahania (loan)	15	(0)
2020–2021	Mesaimeer	14	(3)
2021–2024	Al Ahli (Doha)	54	(5)
2024–2025	Al-Shamal	2	(0)
2025	→ Al Ahli (Tripoli) (loan)	5	(0)
2025–2026	Muaither	11	(1)
- * Club domestic league appearances and goals

Al Dokali Al Sayed (born December 20, 1993) is a Libyan footballer that currently plays as a midfielder.

== Career ==
Al Seyed has appeared in four AFC Champions League matches. His first appearance was as a substitute in the match against Al Shabab. He was then an unused substitute in the 3–3 draw with Tractor Sazi, and their following match, a 3–1 victory over Al Jazira. He returned to the side in the next game, scoring his first AFC Champions League goal in the reverse game against Tractor Sazi, a penalty at the start of the second half, having also made his first Champions League start of the season. His final appearance in that season's competition was as a substitute in their last group game, a 2–0 loss to Al-Ahli.
