= 2014 Sheikh Jassim Cup =

Lekhwiya	Al Sadd
2	3
- Date: 13 August 2014
- Venue: Abdullah bin Khalifa Stadium, Doha

The 2014 Sheikh Jassim Cup was the 36th edition of the cup competition for football teams from Qatar. It has now changed from a group staged pre-season tournament featuring all Qatari Stars League sides, to a one-off match between the previous seasons Qatar Stars League winners and Emir of Qatar Cup winners.

Newly built Abdullah bin Khalifa Stadium – the home base of Lekhwiya – will host the Sheikh Jassim Cup final between Al Sadd and Lekhwiya.

== Match details ==
13 August 2014

Lekhwiya (Qatar)	2 – 3	(Qatar) Al Sadd
Weiss 12' (pen.); Msakni 71'		Rodrigo Tabata 10'; Muriqui 80' (pen.), 86'

Abdullah bin Khalifa Stadium, Doha

Lekhwiya	Al Sadd

Formation: 4–4–2
GK	1
DF	2
DF	4
DF	6
DF	8
MF	11
MF	16
MF	21
MF	22
FW	9
FW	10
Substitutes
GK	31
DF	7
MF	17
MF	24
MF	29
MF	33
FW	18
Manager
(Denmark) Michael Laudrup

Formation: 4–4–2
GK	1
DF	2
DF	4
DF	6
DF	8
MF	11
MF	16
MF	21
MF	22
FW	9
FW	10
Substitutes
GK	31
DF	7
MF	17
MF	24
MF	29
MF	33
FW	18
Manager
(Morocco) Hussein Amotta
