= Hashim Ali =

Qatari footballer (born 2000)

Personal information
- Full name: Hashim Ali Abdullatif
- Date of birth: 17 August 2000 (age 26)
- Place of birth: Mombasa, Kenya
- Height: 1.65 m (5 ft 5 in)
- Position: Midfielder

Team information
- Current team: Al Sadd
- Number: 23

Senior career*
Years	Team	Apps	(Gls)
2019–	Al Sadd	66	(4)
2019	→ Al-Arabi (loan)	6	(0)
2021–2022	→ Al-Rayyan (loan)	19	(4)

International career^{‡}
2018	Qatar U19	5	(5)
2019	Qatar U20	3	(0)
2018	Qatar U21	4	(0)
2018	Qatar U23	20	(8)
2018–	Qatar	5	(0)
- * Club domestic league appearances and goals as of 17 January 2026 ‡ National team caps and goals as of 1 March 2023

Hashim Ali Abdullatif (Arabic: هاشم علي عبد اللطيف; born 17 August 2000) is a Qatari professional footballer who plays as a midfielder for Qatar Stars League side Al Sadd. Born in Kenya, he plays for the Qatar national team.

== Club career ==
Ali began his professional career with Al Sadd SC in 2019. In January 2019 he was loaned to Al-Arabi SC and in September 2021 to Al-Rayyan SC. In June 2022 he returned to Al Sadd SC.

== Honours ==
=== Club ===
Al-Sadd

- Qatar Stars League: 2020-21
- Qatar Cup: 2020, 2021
- Emir of Qatar Cup: 2020
- Sheikh Jassim Cup: 2019
- Qatari Stars Cup: 2019-20
