= Rodrigo Tabata =

Qatari footballer (born 1980)

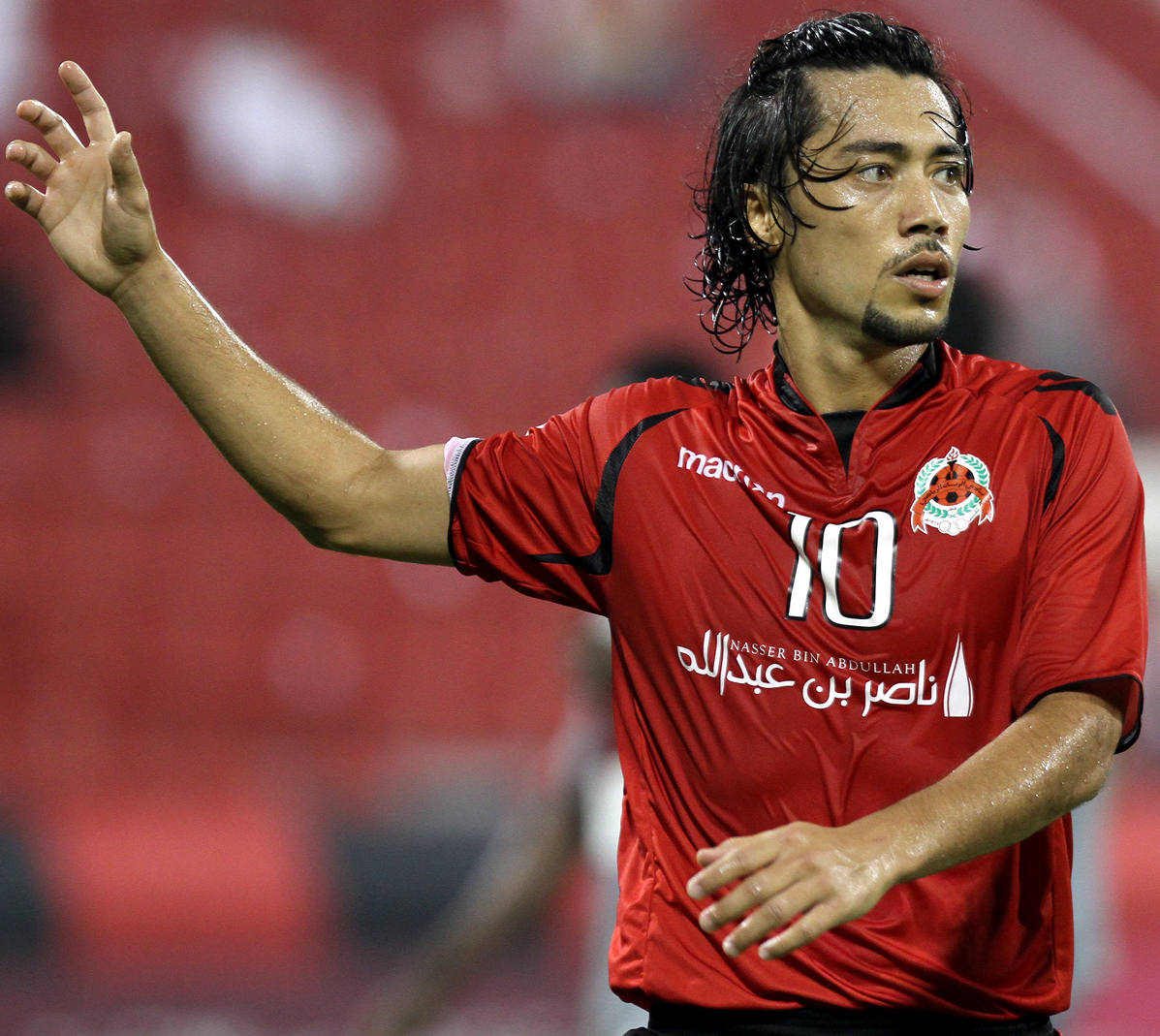
- Tabata with Al Rayyan in 2012

Personal information
- Full name: Rodrigo Barbosa Tabata
- Date of birth: 19 November 1980 (age 45)
- Place of birth: Araçatuba, Brazil
- Height: 1.71 m (5 ft 7 in)
- Position: Attacking midfielder

Team information
- Current team: Al-Markhiya
- Number: 11

Youth career
- 1997–1998: Paulista

Senior career*
Years	Team	Apps	(Gls)
1999	Paulista	5	(2)
2000	São Bento	7	(2)
2001	Santo André	5	(1)
2001	Ferroviário	5	(0)
2001	Inter de Limeira	6	(4)
2002	Treze	7	(3)
2002	Serrano-PB	2	(1)
2002	Ceará	3	(0)
2003	XV de Piracicaba	3	(1)
2003	América-RN	5	(2)
2003	Campinense-PB	17	(4)
2004–2005	Goiás	76	(18)
2006–2009	Santos	79	(15)
2008–2009	→ Gaziantepspor (loan)	29	(12)
2009–2011	Beşiktaş	30	(2)
2011	→ Al Rayyan (loan)	11	(7)
2011–2020	Al Rayyan	173	(121)
2014–2015	→ Al Sadd (loan)	22	(13)
2020–2023	Al Sadd	59	(23)
2023–2025	Al Rayyan	29	(2)
2025–2026	Al Kharaitiyat	4	(1)
2026–	Al-Markhiya	1	(1)

International career^{‡}
2015–2017	Qatar	18	(2)
- * Club domestic league appearances and goals ‡ National team caps and goals as of 24 January 2025

Rodrigo Barbosa Tabata (born 19 November 1980) or simply Rodrigo Tabata, is a professional footballer who plays as an attacking midfielder for Qatari club Al-Markhiya. Born in Brazil, he played for the Qatar national team.

== Club career ==
=== Career in Brazil ===
Tabata was born in Araçatuba, Brazil, of Japanese descent. Earlier in his career, he was a journeyman and played for 11 different clubs between 1999 and 2003. In 2004, he moved to Goiás, playing the Campeonato Brasileiro Série A for the first time. His good performances helped his club finishing in 3rd place in the 2005 edition, the best position Goiás ever achieved in the top flight and qualifying for the Copa Libertadores for the first time in its history.

Tabata was purchased by Santos in 2006, where he won twice the Campeonato Paulista in 2006 and 2007. In 2008, he moved abroad to Gaziantepspor in a three-year loan deal with an option to a permanent purchase.

=== Gaziantepspor and Beşiktaş ===
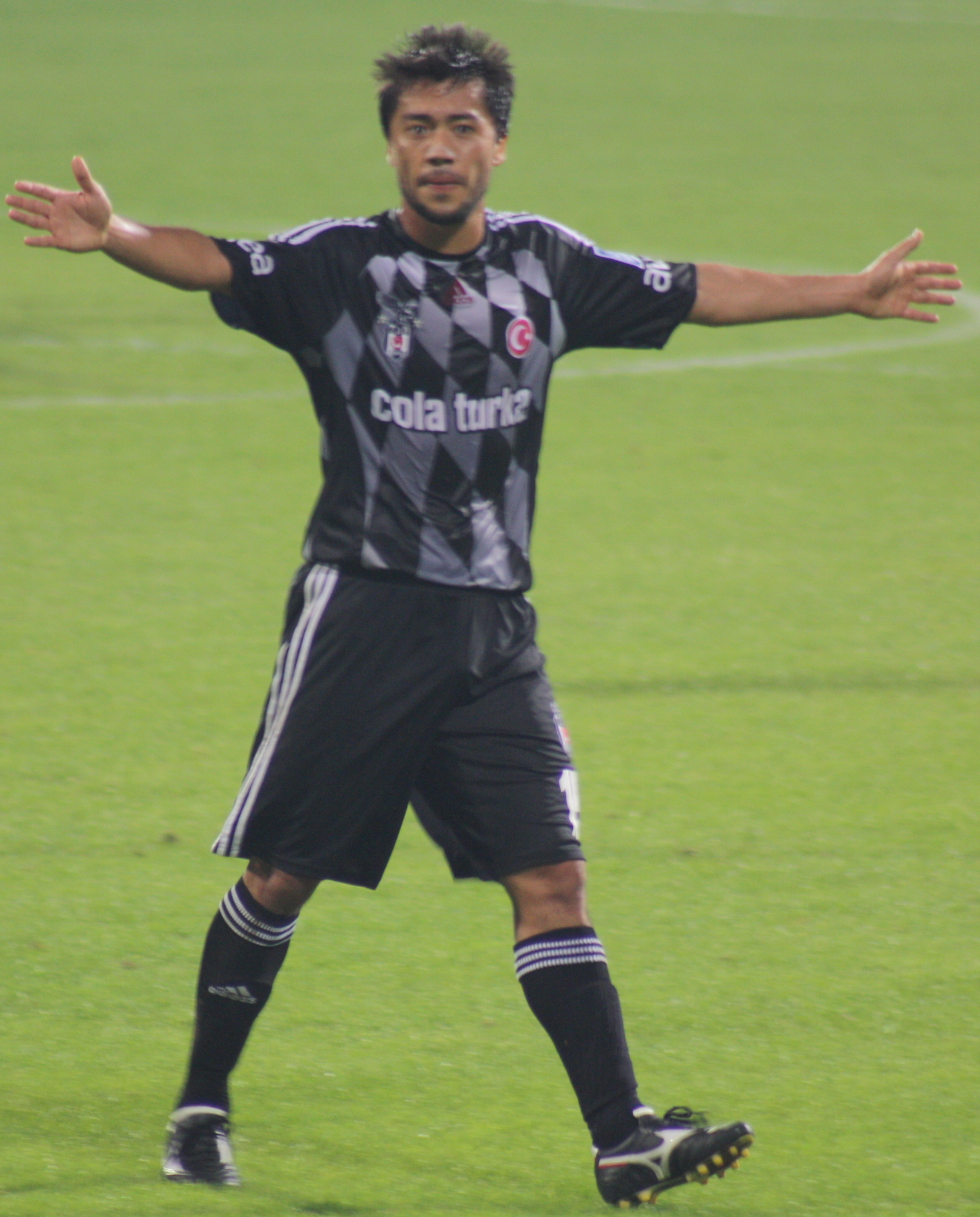
Tabata playing for Beşiktaş at 2009–10

After a successful season with Gaziantepspor, Tabata moved to Beşiktaş for €8 million transfer fee. The transfer caused controversy at Santos as the Brazilian club claimed that they have not received the fee from Gaziantepspor to make the deal permanent before the deal was finished between the Turkish clubs.

Tabata played one full season at Beşiktaş before moving on loan to Al Rayyan in 2010, later being purchased by the Qatari side in 2011.

=== Al Rayyan ===
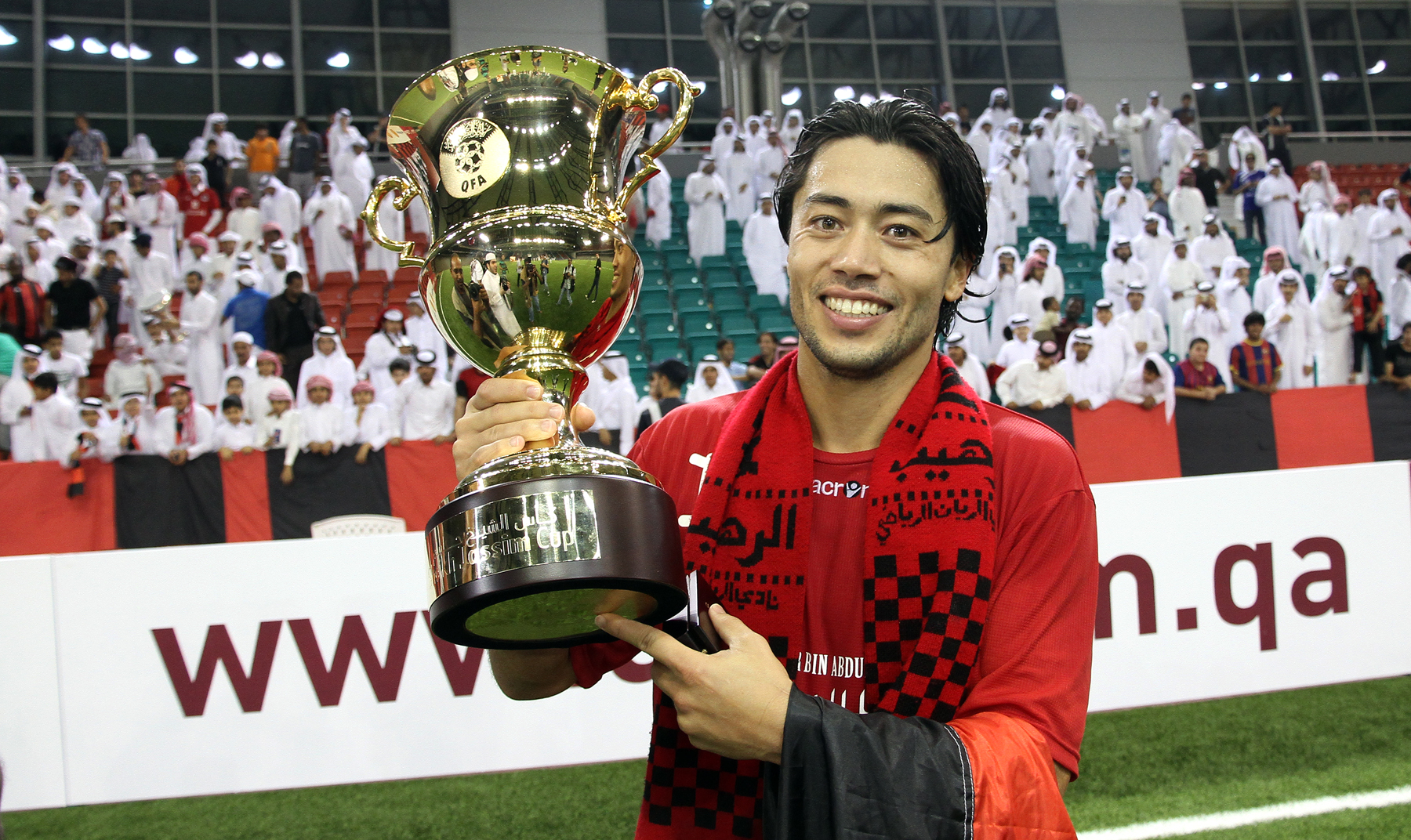
Tabata after winning the 2012 Sheikh Jassim Cup

In late 2011, the Al Rayyan administration asked Tabata, who has Japanese grandparents, to obtain a Japanese passport for reasons relating to the foreign player quota of the AFC Champions League. However, Tabata failed the prerequisites as he was unable to write or read the Japanese language.

He received a $100,000 cash award on 8 April 2012 for scoring a super hat-trick (4 goals) against Qatar SC in a league game to give his team an 8–2 win, which was the highest scoring game recorded in the league for the 2011–12 season. He also won the player of the year award in the Qatar Stars League that season, recording 17 goals and 9 assists.

==== Loan to Al Sadd ====
On 31 January 2014, he signed a loan deal with another Qatari club and title holders Al Sadd. He returned to Al Rayyan in 2015.

=== Al Sadd ===
In July 2020, Tabata signed with Al Sadd for one year. He then returned to Al Rayyan in 2023.

According to IFFHS, Tabata was the fourth-oldest player in the world to play a match in the top tier of a national league in 2024, at the age of 44 years and 18 days, in his last Qatar Stars League game in 2024 against Qatar SC, which ended in a 2–1 loss.

=== Al Kharaitiyat ===
In August 2025, Tabata signed for Qatari Second Division side Al Kharaitiyat.

== International career ==
After years of playing in Qatar, he became a naturalized Qatari citizen and was therefore eligible for the Brazilian and Qatari national football teams. In August 2015, Tabata was selected for the Qatar national team's camp in Austria. His unofficial debut came in a friendly against Austrian club LASK Linz on 17 August 2015. He made his official debut in a FIFA World Cup qualifier match against Hong Kong in a 2–0 win.

== Career statistics ==
=== Club ===
As of match played 24 January 2025

Appearances and goals by club, season and competition
Club	Season	League			National cup (Note: Includes Copa do Brasil, Turkish Cup)		Continental		Other		Total	
Club	Season	Division	Apps	Goals	Apps	Goals	Apps	Goals	Apps	Goals	Apps	Goals
Treze	2002	Série C			2	0	–		2 (Note: Appearances in Copa do Nordeste)	2	4	2
XV de Novembro	2003	Série A3	3	1	0	0	–		–		3	1
América(RN)	2003	Série B	5	2	0	0	–		0	0	5	2
Campinense	2003	Série C	17	4	0	0	–		8 (Note: Appearances in Campeonato Paraibano)	5	25	9
Goiás	2004	Série A	37	10	5	1	4 (Note: Appearances in Copa Sudamericana)	2	14	9	60	22
Goiás	2005	Série A	39	8	0	0	2	0	12	4	53	12
Goiás	Total		76	18	5	1	6	2	26	13	113	34
Santos	2006	Série A	36	8	5	0	4	0	18 (Note: Appearances in Campeonato Paulista)	2	63	10
Santos	2007	Série A	37	7	0	0	10 (Note: Appearances in Copa Libertadores)	1	20	4	67	12
Santos	2008	Série A	6	0	0	0	4	0	11	1	21	1
Santos	Total		79	15	5	0	18	1	49	7	151	23
Gaziantepspor	2008–09	Süper Lig	26	11	5	2	–		–		31	13
Gaziantepspor	2009–10	Süper Lig	3	1	0	0	–		–		3	1
Gaziantepspor	Total		29	12	5	2	–		–		34	14
Beşiktaş	2009–10	Süper Lig	16	2	2	0	3 (Note: Appearances in UEFA Champions League)	0	0	0	21	2
Beşiktaş	2010–11	Süper Lig	14	0	3	0	10 (Note: Appearances in UEFA Europa League)	0	–		27	0
Beşiktaş	Total		30	2	5	0	13	0	0	0	48	2
Al-Rayyan (loan)	2010–11	Qatar Stars League	11	7	3	4	4 (Note: Appearances in AFC Champions League)	0	1	0	19	11
Al-Rayyan	2011–12	Qatar Stars League	21	17	1	0	6	3	4	5	32	25
Al-Rayyan	2012–13	Qatar Stars League	22	11	3	1	4	1	7	3	36	16
Al-Rayyan	2013–14	Qatar Stars League	16	4	0	0	–		5	6	21	10
Al-Rayyan	2014–15	Qatari Second Division	8	21	4	4	–		7	5	19	30
Al-Rayyan	2015–16	Qatar Stars League	24	21	2	3	–		1	0	27	24
Al-Rayyan	2016–17	Qatar Stars League	24	20	3	4	6	4	2	0	35	28
Al-Rayyan	2017–18	Qatar Stars League	21	15	3	3	5	2	6	2	35	22
Al-Rayyan	2018–19	Qatar Stars League	20	9	2	1	6	1	7	6	35	17
Al-Rayyan	2019–20	Qatar Stars League	16	4	2	1	1	0	5	4	24	9
Al-Rayyan	Total		172	122	20	17	28	11	44	31	264	181
Al-Sadd (loan)	2013–14	Qatar Stars League	7	5	3	2	7	2	3	1	20	10
Al-Sadd (loan)	2014–15	Qatar Stars League	15	8	0	0	2	0	1	1	18	9
Al-Sadd	2019–20	Qatar Stars League	4	1	1	0	5	1	1	1	11	3
Al-Sadd	2020–21	Qatar Stars League	21	11	3	0	3	0	7	3	34	14
Al-Sadd	2021–22	Qatar Stars League	21	7	3	1	5	3	–		29	11
Al-Sadd	2022–23	Qatar Stars League	13	4	3	0	0	0	6	3	22	7
Al-Sadd	Total		81	36	13	3	22	6	18	9	134	54
Al-Rayyan	2023–24	Qatar Stars League	14	2	3	0	0	0	7	2	24	4
Al-Rayyan	2024–25	Qatar Stars League	10	0	0	0	2	0	6	2	18	2
Al-Rayyan	Total		24	2	3	0	2	0	13	4	42	6
Career total			528	222	61	27	93	20	161	71	843	340

=== International ===
Scores and results list Qatar's goal tally first, score column indicates score after each Rodrigo Tabata goal.

List of international goals scored by Rodrigo Tabata
No.	Date	Venue	Opponent	Score	Result	Competition
1	8 August 2016	Jassim Bin Hamad Stadium, Doha, Qatar	Iraq	1–0	2–1	Friendly
2	25 August 2016	Jassim Bin Hamad Stadium, Doha, Qatar	Thailand	2–0	3–0	Friendly

== Honours ==
Santos

- Campeonato Paulista: 2006, 2007

Al Rayyan

- Qatar Stars League: 2015–16
- Emir of Qatar Cup: 2013
- Sheikh Jassim Cup: 2012, 2013, 2018

Al-Sadd

- Qatar Stars League: 2020–21, 2021–22
- Qatar Cup: 2020, 2021
- Emir of Qatar Cup: 2014, 2020, 2021
- Sheikh Jassim Cup: 2014

Individual

- Qatar Stars League Player of the Year: 2011–12, 2015–16
- Qatar Stars League Top Scorer: 2015–16
