= Abdulaziz Al-Ansari =

Qatari footballer (born 1992)

Abdulaziz Al Ansari
Personal information
- Full name: Abdulaziz Rashid Al Ansari
- Date of birth: 19 February 1992 (age 34)
- Place of birth: Qatar
- Height: 1.74 m (5 ft 9 in)
- Positions: Striker; second striker

Youth career
- 2001–2009: Al Sadd

Senior career*
Years	Team	Apps	(Gls)
2009–2017	Al Sadd	14	(4)
2013	→ Al Kharaitiyat (loan)	9	(3)
2013–2014	→ Eupen (loan)	1	(0)
2014–2016	→ Al Kharaitiyat (loan)	42	(5)
2017	→ Al Kharaitiyat (loan)	6	(1)
2017–2020	Al Kharaitiyat	14	(2)
2019–2020	→ Al Sadd (loan)	12	(1)
2020–2024	Al Arabi	30	(6)
2023–2024	→ Al-Shamal (loan)	3	(0)
2024–2025	Qatar	4	(0)

International career
–2009	Qatar U-17	20	(15)
—	Qatar U-23	5	(3)
2013	Qatar	1	(0)
- * Club domestic league appearances and goals

Abdulaziz Al Ansari (Arabic: عبد العزيز الأنصاري; born 19 February 1992) is a Qatari professional footballer who plays as a striker. He also plays for the Qatar national Olympic team, and has appeared the national U-17 team as well.

== Career ==
Ansari joined Al Sadd's senior team when he was 16 years old, after previously playing for their youth team. Since then, he has played mostly on the reserve team, scoring 27 goals in 28 appearances. In addition, he scored 50 goals in 15 games in the U-17 league. Ansari was awarded "Best Player Under-21" by QFA two times.

In March 2011, he had a trial with Premier League side West Ham United. It was widely reported that he had joined the English outfit. However, the move never materialized.

In the Summer of 2013, he joined Belgian Second Division side K.A.S. Eupen but made one appearance as a substitute until the transfer window opened on 1 January 2014. He returned to his former team Al Sadd.

== Honours ==
=== Al Sadd ===
- Qatar Stars League: 2012–13
- Emir of Qatar Cup: 2014
- AFC Champions League: 2011
- Qatari Stars Cup: 2010
- Sheikh Jassim Cup: 2017, 2019
- Qatar Cup: 2020
- FIFA Club World Cup: 2011 bronze medal

=== Al Kharaitiyat ===
- GCC Champions League

Semi-finals: 2013

=== Qatar nation team ===
- WAFF Championship: 2013 gold medal

=== Individual ===
- Reserve League top scorer: 2 (2010, 2011)
- U-17 league top scorer: 1
- U-15 league top scorer: 1
- U-12 league top scorer: 1
- U-17 league top scorer in one season: 42 goals in 18 games
- Aspire tournament top scorer: 4 goals in 3 games
- Nominated to top 3 young player of the year in 2011–12 season

== Personal ==
He graduated from Aspire Academy.

On 8 June 2012, he tied the knot and held a ceremony which Al Sadd, and other QSL players, attended.
