= 2019–20 Qatari Stars Cup =

Tournament details
- Country: Qatar
- Dates: 11 October 2019 – 10 October 2020
- Teams: 12

Final positions
- Champions: Al Sadd SC (2nd title)
- Runners-up: Al-Arabi SC

Tournament statistics
- Matches played: 37
- Goals scored: 115 (3.11 per match)

The 2019 Qatari Stars Cup was the ninth edition of Qatari Stars Cup.

The tournament featured 12 teams divided into 2 groups.

== Round One Groups ==
Group A	Group B
Al Ahli SC; Al-Wakrah SC; Al Sadd SC; Al-Rayyan SC; Umm Salal SC; Al Shahaniya SC	Al-Khor SC; Qatar SC; Al-Arabi SC; Al-Gharafa SC; Al-Duhail SC; Al-Sailiya SC

=== Standings ===
==== Group A ====
Pos	Team	Pld	W	D	L	GF	GA	GD	Pts
1	Al Ahli SC	5	4	0	1	15	8	+7	12
2	Al-Wakrah SC	5	2	2	1	6	7	−1	8
3	Al Sadd SC	5	2	1	2	15	12	+3	7
4	Al-Rayyan SC	5	2	1	2	9	10	−1	7
5	Umm Salal SC	5	1	3	1	6	6	0	6
6	Al Shahaniya SC	5	0	1	4	2	10	−8	1

Source: soccerway.com
Rules for classification: 1) points; 2) goal difference; 3) number of goals scored.

===== Results =====
Date	Team 1	Score	Team 2
2019/10/11	Al Sadd SC	1–5	Al-Wakrah SC
2019/10/11	Al Shahaniya SC	0–3	Al-Rayyan SC
2019/10/11	Al Ahli SC	2–0	Umm Salal SC
2019/11/15	Al-Wakrah SC	0–0	Umm Salal SC
2019/11/15	Al Sadd SC	3–1	Al Shahaniya SC
2019/11/15	Al-Rayyan SC	4–1	Al Ahli SC
2019/11/23	Al Shahaniya SC	0–0	Al-Wakrah SC
2019/11/23	Al Ahli SC	4–3	Al Sadd SC
2019/11/23	Umm Salal	2–2	Al-Rayyan SC
2019/12/01	Al-Wakrah SC	2–1	Al-Rayyan SC
2019/12/01	Al Sadd SC	2–2	Umm Salal SC
2019/12/01	Al Shahaniya SC	1–2	Al Ahli SC
2019/12/06	Al Ahli SC	6–0	Al-Wakrah SC
2019/12/06	Al-Rayyan SC	0–6	Al Sadd SC
2019/12/06	Umm Salal SC	2–0	Al Shahaniya SC

==== Group B ====
Pos	Team	Pld	W	D	L	GF	GA	GD	Pts
1	Al-Khor SC	5	4	1	0	14	3	+11	13
2	Qatar SC	5	3	1	1	9	2	+7	10
3	Al-Arabi SC	5	1	4	0	7	6	+1	7
4	Al-Gharafa SC	5	1	2	2	6	10	−4	5
5	Al-Duhail SC	5	0	3	2	6	14	−8	3
6	Al-Sailiya SC	5	0	1	4	5	12	−7	1

Source: soccerway.com
Rules for classification: 1) points; 2) goal difference; 3) number of goals scored.

===== Results =====
Date	Team 1	Score	Team 2
2019/10/12	Al-Khor SC	1–1	Al-Arabi SC
2019/10/12	Al-Duhail SC	2–2	Al-Gharafa SC
2019/10/12	Al-Sailiya SC	0–4	Qatar SC
2019/11/16	Al-Gharafa SC	0–3	Qatar SC
2019/11/16	Al-Duhail SC	0–7	Al-Khor SC
2019/11/16	Al-Arabi SC	2–1	Al-Sailiya SC
2019/11/22	Al-Khor SC	3–1	Al-Gharafa SC
2019/11/22	Al-Sailiya SC	2–2	Al-Duhail SC
2019/11/22	Qatar SC	1–1	Al-Arabi SC
2019/11/28	Al-Gharafa SC	1–1	Al-Arabi SC
2019/11/28	Al-Duhail SC	0–1	Qatar SC
2019/11/28	Al-Khor SC	2–1	Al-Sailiya SC
2019/12/07	Qatar SC	0–1	Al-Khor SC
2019/12/07	Al-Sailiya SC	1–2	Al-Gharafa SC
2019/12/07	Al-Arabi SC	2–2	Al-Duhail SC

== Knockout round ==
=== Quarter-finals ===
13 February 2020
13:45 AST (UTC+3)

Al-Wakrah SC	0–1	Al-Arabi SC
	Report	Pierre-Michel Lasogga 5'

Grand Hamad Stadium, Al-Arabi SC

13 February 2020
16:45 AST (UTC+3)

Al Ahli SC	1–0	Al-Gharafa SC
Nabil El Zhar 55'	Report

Grand Hamad Stadium, Al-Arabi SC

15 February 2020
13:45 AST (UTC+3)

Qatar SC	1–1	Al Sadd SC
Kayke 79'	Report	Hamid Ismail 62'

Suheim bin Hamad Stadium, Qatar SC

15 February 2020
16:45 AST (UTC+3)

Al-Khor SC	1–1	Al-Rayyan SC
Tiago Bezerra 56'	Report	Rodrigo Tabata 74'

Suheim bin Hamad Stadium, Qatar SC

=== Semi-finals ===
29 August 2020
13:00 AST (UTC+3)

Al-Rayyan SC	1–2	Al-Arabi SC
Abdurahman Al-Harazi 29'	Report	Abdulaziz Al-Ansari 44'; Hamdi Harbaoui 57'

Jassim bin Hamad Stadium, Al Sadd SC

29 August 2020
16:00 AST (UTC+3)

Al Ahli SC	0–2	Al Sadd SC
	Report	Santi Cazorla 71'; Akram Afif 90+2'

Jassim bin Hamad Stadium, Al Sadd SC

== Final ==
10 October 2020
15:00 AST (UTC+3)

Al Sadd SC	4–0	Al-Arabi SC
Yusuf Abdurisag 17'; Nam Tae-hee 53'; Santi Cazorla 77'; Rodrigo Tabata 90+1'	Report

Abdullah bin Khalifa Stadium, Al-Duhail SC
