= 2021 Amir of Qatar Cup =

Amir Cup 2021 (Qatar)
Tournament details
- Country: Qatar
- Dates: 25 January 2021 – 22 October 2021
- Teams: 16

Final positions
- Champions: Al Sadd SC
- Runners-up: Al-Rayyan SC

Tournament statistics
- Matches played: 15
- Goals scored: 83 (5.53 per match)

The 2021 Amir of Qatar Cup (named Amir Cup since 2019) was the 49th edition of the Qatari cup tournament in men's football. It was played by the first and second level divisions of the Qatari football league structure. Al Sadd defeated Al-Rayyan on penalties to lift the trophy.

== Round of 16 ==
| 25 January 2021 | Qatar SC | 2–2 (4–5 p) | Al-Shamal SC | Doha |
| 13:30 | Khaled Waleed 41'; Youcef Belaïli 60' | Report | Yannick Sagbo 5'; Yannick Sagbo 67' | Stadium: Suheim bin Hamad Stadium; Referee: Meshari Al Shammari |
| | Penalties |
| | Hamid Ismail (penalty scored); Bashar Resan (penalty scored); El Mehdi Barrahma (penalty scored); Álex Gálvez (penalty scored) | | (penalty scored) Yasin Yaqoob; (penalty scored) Ismail Diakhité; (penalty scored) Magid Mohamed; (penalty scored) Baha' Faisal; (penalty scored) Adel Ahmed |

| 25 January 2021 | Al-Wakrah SC | 1–2 | Al Kharaitiyat SC | Doha |
| 16:15 | Abdennour Belhocini 44' | Report | Rachid Tiberkanine 55'; Mohammed Osman 85' | Stadium: Suheim bin Hamad Stadium; Referee: Hamad Al Subaie |

| 25 January 2021 | Al-Duhail SC | 6–0 | Al Ahli | Doha |
| 16:15 | Michael Olunga 6'; Edmilson Junior 22'; Michael Olunga 43'; Michael Olunga 69'; Luiz Júnior 78'; Edmilson Junior 90' | Report | | Stadium: Grand Hamad Stadium; Referee: Saoud Al Athbah |

| 26 January 2021 | Al-Rayyan SC | 1–0 | Al-Markhiya SC | Doha |
| 13:30 | Yohan Boli 45+1' | Report | | Stadium: Jassim bin Hamad Stadium; Referee: Mohammed Al Obedly |

| 26 January 2021 | Al-Gharafa SC | 2–2 (5–4 p) | Al Shahaniya SC | Doha |
| 16:15 | Moayed Hassan 23'; Jonathan Kodjia 44' | Report | Birahim Gaye 83'; Birahim Gaye 90' | Stadium: Hamad bin Khalifa Stadium; Referee: Youssef Al Sharshani |
| | Penalties |
| | Homam Ahmed (penalty scored); Héctor Moreno (penalty scored); Sofiane Hanni (penalty scored); Jonathan Kodjia (penalty scored); Adlène Guedioura (penalty scored) | | (penalty scored) Abulhamid Anad Al Deri; (penalty scored) Ulises Pascua; (penalty scored) Noor Rahman; (penalty scored) Birahim Gaye |

| 26 January 2021 | Al Sadd SC | 7–0 | Muaither SC | Doha |
| 16:15 | Hashim Ali 10'; Hashim Ali 30'; Boualem Khoukhi 64'; Mohammed Waad 66'; Yusuf Abdurisag 78'; Akram Afif 83'; Yusuf Abdurisag 90+2' | Report | | Stadium: Jassim bin Hamad Stadium; Referee: Moatasem Al Mazyed |

| 27 January 2021 | Al-Sailiya SC | 4–2 | Al-Khor SC | Doha |
| 13:30 | Mohanad Ali 9'; Tiago Bezerra 22'; Mohanad Ali 35'; Ahmed Al-Minhali 90+3' | Report | Giannis Fetfatzidis 4'; Rafael Vaz 77' | Stadium: Grand Hamad Stadium; Referee: Khamis Al Marri |

| 27 January 2021 | Al-Arabi SC | 2–1 | Umm Salal SC | Doha |
| 19:30 | Yasser Aboubaker Essa 28'; Mehrdad Mohammadi 84' | Report | Anas Mubarak 36' | Stadium: Suheim bin Hamad Stadium; Referee: Abdulrahman bin Jassim |

== Quarter-finals ==
| 2 March 2021 | Al-Duhail SC | 2–0 | Al-Shamal SC | Doha |
| 13:50 | Michael Olunga 45+3'; Abdullah Al-Ahrak 84' | Report | | Stadium: Suheim bin Hamad Stadium; Referee: Mohammed Al-Shammari |

| 2 March 2021 | Al Kharaitiyat SC | 0–2 | Al-Rayyan SC | Doha |
| 16:15 | | Report | Yohan Boli 45+1'; Yohan Boli 83' | Stadium: Abdullah bin Nasser bin Khalifa Stadium; Referee: Meshari Al Shammari |

| 3 March 2021 | Al-Gharafa SC | 0–5 | Al Sadd SC | Doha |
| 13:50 | | Report | Nam Tae-hee 25'; Baghdad Bounedjah 26'; Akram Afif 45'; Baghdad Bounedjah 72'; Yusuf Abdurisag 80' | Stadium: Abdullah bin Nasser bin Khalifa Stadium; Referee: Salman Ahmad Falahi |

| 3 March 2021 | Al-Sailiya SC | 1–4 | Al-Arabi SC | Doha |
| 16:15 | Mohanad Ali 12' | Report | Mehrdad Mohammadi 24'; Youssef Msakni 62'; Mohamed Salah Elneel 66'; Youssef Msakni 73' | Stadium: Suheim bin Hamad Stadium; Referee: Abdullah Al Athbah |

== Semi-finals ==
| 9 May 2021 | Al Sadd SC | 3–0 | Al-Arabi SC | Doha |
| 19:00 | Nam Tae-hee 10'; Baghdad Bounedjah 56'; Santi Cazorla 80' | Report | | Stadium: Jassim Bin Hamad Stadium; Referee: Abdulrahman Al Jassim |

| 10 May 2021 | Al-Duhail SC | 1–2 | Al-Rayyan SC | Doha |
| 17:00 | Michael Olunga 81' | Report | Dame Traoré 13'; Yacine Brahimi 59' | Stadium: Jassim Bin Hamad Stadium; Referee: Khamis Al Marri |

== Final ==
| 22 October 2021 | Al Sadd SC | 1–1 (5–4 p) | Al-Rayyan SC | Doha |
| 16:00 | Santi Cazorla 58' | Report | Yacine Brahimi 44' | Stadium: Al Thumama Stadium; Referee: Abdullah Al Athbah |
| | Penalties |
| | Santi Cazorla (penalty scored); Rodrigo Tabata (penalty scored); Akram Afif (penalty scored); Boualem Khoukhi (penalty scored); Jung Woo-Young (penalty scored) | | (penalty scored) Yacine Brahimi; (penalty scored) Yohan Boli; (penalty scored) Abdulaziz Hatem; (penalty scored) Steven Nzonzi |

== Top goalscorers ==
| Rank | Player | Club | Goals |
|---|---|---|---|
| 1 | (Kenya) Michael Olunga | Al-Duhail SC | 5 |
| 2 | (Qatar) Yusuf Abdurisag | Al Sadd SC | 3 |
| 2 | (Tunisia) Youssef Msakni | Al-Arabi SC | 3 |
| 2 | (Algeria) Baghdad Bounedjah | Al Sadd SC | 3 |
| 2 | (Iraq) Mohanad Ali | Al-Sailiya SC | 3 |
| 2 | (Ivory Coast) Yohan Boli | Al-Rayyan SC | 3 |
