= 2021–22 Qatar Stars League =

58th season of top-tier football league in Qatar

Qatar Stars League
- Season: 2021–2022
- Dates: 11 September 2021 – 11 March 2022
- Champions: Al Sadd
- Relegated: Al-Khor
- Champions League: Al Sadd
- Champions League Play-off round: Al Duhail; Al-Wakrah
- Matches: 125
- Goals: 407 (3.26 per match)
- Top goalscorer: Michael Olunga (25 goals)
- Biggest home win: Al Sadd 7–2 Al-Shamal (26 September 2021); Al Duhail 5–0 Al-Sailiya (26 September 2021); Al-Gharafa 5–0 Al-Khor (26 October 2021); Al Duhail 6–1 Umm Salal (2 March 2022)
- Biggest away win: Al Ahli 0–6 Al Duhail (29 December 2021); Al-Shamal 0–6 Umm Salal (23 January 2022); Al-Wakrah 0–6 Al Sadd (31 January 2022); Al Ahli 2–8 Al Sadd (21 February 2022)
- Highest scoring: Al Sadd 6–4 Al-Gharafa (17 October 2021); Al Ahli 2–8 Al Sadd (21 February 2022)
- Longest winning run: 9 matches Al Sadd
- Longest unbeaten run: 20 matches Al Sadd
- Longest winless run: 16 matches Al-Sailiya
- Longest losing run: 6 matches Al-Sailiya

The 2021–22 Qatari League, also known as Qatar Stars League or QNB Stars League, was the 49th edition of top-level football championship in Qatar. The league kicked off on 11 September 2021 and ended on 11 March 2022. Al Sadd were defending champions and won the league for a second straight undefeated season.

== Teams ==
=== Team location ===
Location football club of Qatar Stars League

=== Stadia and locations ===
Club	City/Town	Stadium	Capacity
Al Ahli	Doha	Hamad bin Khalifa Stadium	18,000
Al-Arabi	Doha	Grand Hamad Stadium	13,000
Al Duhail	Doha	Abdullah bin Khalifa Stadium	9,000
Al-Gharafa	Doha	Thani bin Jassim Stadium	21,175
Al-Khor	Al Khor	Al-Khor SC Stadium	12,000
Al-Rayyan	Al-Rayyan	Ahmad bin Ali Stadium	50,000
Al Sadd	Doha	Jassim Bin Hamad Stadium	12,946
Al-Sailiya	Doha	Hamad bin Khalifa Stadium	18,000
Al-Shamal	Al Shamal	Al-Shamal SC Stadium	5,000
Al-Wakrah	Al Wakrah	Al Janoub Stadium	40,000
Qatar SC	Doha	Suheim bin Hamad Stadium	13,000
Umm Salal	Doha	Suheim Bin Hamad Stadium	13,000

=== Personnel and kits ===
Club	Head coach	Captain	Kit manufacturer	Shirt sponsor
Al Ahli	(Montenegro) Nebojša Jovović	(Qatar) Ali Qadry	Puma	Regency Group Holding
Al-Arabi	(Qatar) Younes Ali	(Qatar) Ahmed Fatehi	Puma	Doha Bank; Sharq Insurance; Snoonu
Al Duhail	(Portugal) Luís Castro	(Qatar) Almoez Ali	Puma	Al Rayan Bank
Al-Gharafa	(Italy) Andrea Stramaccioni	(Qatar) Qasem Burhan	Puma	N/A
Al-Khor	(Brazil) André Lima (caretaker)	(Qatar) Helal Mohammed	Adidas	N/A
Al-Rayyan	(Chile) Nicolás Córdova (caretaker)	(Algeria) Yacine Brahimi	Puma	Baladna; Mall of Qatar
Al Sadd	(Spain) Javi Gracia	(Qatar) Hassan Al-Haydos	Puma	Qatar Airways
Al-Sailiya	(Tunisia) Sami Trabelsi	(Qatar) Majdi Siddiq	Zat Outfit	N/A
Al-Shamal	(Morocco) Hicham Jadrane	(Jordan) Baha' Faisal	Erreà	N/A
Al-Wakrah	(Spain) Tintín Márquez	(Qatar) Ahmed Fadhel	Puma	N/A
Qatar SC	(Morocco) Youssef Safri	(Qatar) Sebastián Soria	Macron	N/A
Umm Salal	(Qatar) Wesam Rizik	(Tunisia) Aymen Abdennour	Jako	N/A

=== Managerial changes ===
Team	Outgoing manager	Manner of departure	Date of vacancy	Position in table	Incoming manager	Date of appointment
Al-Gharafa	(Serbia) Slaviša Jokanović	Signed by Sheffield United	27 May 2021		(Italy) Andrea Stramaccioni	2 July 2021
Umm Salal	(Morocco) Aziz Ben Askar	End of contract	30 June 2021		(Brazil) Sérgio Farias	July 2021
Qatar SC	(Qatar) Younes Ali	End of contract	30 June 2021		(Brazil) Zé Ricardo	July 2021
Al-Arabi	(Iceland) Heimir Hallgrímsson	End of contract	30 June 2021		(Qatar) Younes Ali	July 2021
Al Duhail	(France) Sabri Lamouchi	Resigned	July 2021		(Portugal) Luís Castro	July 2021
Al Sadd	(Spain) Xavi	Signed by Barcelona	5 November 2021	1st	(Spain) Javi Gracia	7 December 2021
Al-Khor	(Germany) Winfried Schäfer	Sacked	11 November 2021	12th	(Brazil) André Lima (caretaker)	12 November 2021
Al-Rayyan	(France) Laurent Blanc	Sacked	13 February 2022	10th	(Chile) Nicolás Córdova (caretaker)	13 February 2022

== League table ==
Pos	Team	Pld	W	D	L	GF	GA	GD	Pts	Qualification or relegation
1	Al Sadd (C)	22	20	2	0	80	24	+56	62	Qualification for AFC Champions League group stage
2	Al Duhail	22	14	5	3	59	24	+35	47	Qualification for AFC Champions League play-off round (Note: as 2022 Emir of Qatar Cup winner)
3	Al-Wakrah	22	11	4	7	34	30	+4	37	
4	Al-Arabi	22	11	3	8	34	31	+3	36	
5	Al-Gharafa	22	9	3	10	39	40	−1	30	
6	Umm Salal	22	6	7	9	32	36	−4	25	
7	Al Ahli	22	5	10	7	24	39	−15	25	
8	Al-Rayyan	22	6	6	10	31	40	−9	24	
9	Qatar SC	22	6	5	11	21	31	−10	23	
10	Al-Shamal	22	6	4	12	32	47	−15	22	
11	Al-Sailiya (O)	22	3	7	12	17	36	−19	16	Qualification for Relegation play-off
12	Al-Khor (R)	22	2	10	10	21	46	−25	16	Relegation to Qatargas League

Source: QSL, Soccerway
Rules for classification: 1) Points; 2) Goal difference; 3) Number of goals scored;
(C) Champions; (O) Play-off winners; (R) Relegated

== Results ==
Home \ Away	AHL	ARA	DUH	GHA	KHO	RAY	SAD	SAI	SHA	WAK	QAT	UMM
Al Ahli	—	1–1	0–6	0–1	6–3	0–1	2–8	1–0	0–0	1–3	1–0	2–1
Al-Arabi	2–3	—	1–2	3–2	1–1	2–1	0–4	1–0	4–2	1–2	1–2	0–2
Al Duhail	0–0	2–0	—	3–1	1–1	3–0	3–3	5–0	4–1	0–4	2–1	6–1
Al-Gharafa	0–0	0–0	2–4	—	5–0	3–2	1–5	3–0	2–0	0–1	0–2	1–0
Al-Khor	2–2	0–2	1–4	1–1	—	0–0	2–4	1–1	0–1	1–2	2–1	1–1
Al-Rayyan	1–1	2–4	0–4	0–2	2–2	—	2–4	4–2	3–2	3–0	2–1	2–3
Al Sadd	4–1	4–2	1–1	6–4	3–0	1–0	—	2–0	7–2	2–1	1–0	2–0
Al-Sailiya	2–2	0–1	1–1	3–2	0–0	1–1	0–2	—	0–2	0–1	1–1	0–0
Al-Shamal	3–0	1–3	0–1	2–3	4–0	1–2	1–5	2–3	—	3–0	2–1	0–6
Al-Wakrah	0–0	0–1	4–1	3–2	4–1	1–1	0–6	2–1	1–1	—	0–1	1–4
Qatar SC	0–0	0–2	0–5	2–3	0–0	1–0	1–3	2–1	1–1	0–0	—	2–2
Umm Salal	1–1	0–2	2–1	3–1	1–1	2–2	1–3	0–1	1–1	0–4	1–2	—

Source: Flashscore
Legend: Blue = home team win; Yellow = draw; Red = away team win.

=== Positions by round ===
Leader : 2023 AFC Champions League Group stage
2023 AFC Champions League group stage
2023 AFC Champions League qualifying play-off
Qualification to Relegation play-off
Relegation to 2022–23 Qatargas League

Team ╲ Round	1	2	3	4	5	6	7	8	9	10	11	12	13	14	15	16	17	18	19	20	21	22
Al Sadd	2	2	1	1	1	1	1	1	1	1	1	1	1	1	1	1	1	1	1	1	1	1
Al Duhail	1	1	2	2	2	2	2	2	2	2	2	2	2	2	2	2	2	2	2	2	2	2
Al-Arabi	4	4	4	3	4	3	3	3	3	3	3											
Al-Gharafa	3	3	3	4	3	5	5	5	4	4	4											
Al-Wakrah	9	8	5	5	5	4	4	4	5	5	5*											
Umm Salal	6	7	6	6	7	7	9	8	6	6	6	6										
Qatar SC	7	10	11	12	8	8	7	9	7	7	7	7										
Al-Rayyan	5	6	10	8	6	6	6	6	8	9	8	8										
Al Ahli	8	9	9	7	11	9	8	10	10	8	10	9										
Al-Shamal	10	12	7	9	9	12	11	7	9	10	9	10										
Al-Sailiya	11	5	8	10	10	11	12	11	11	11	12	11										
Al-Khor	12	11	12	11	12	10	10	12	12	12	11	12										

Updated to match(es) played on 5 January 2022. Source: QSL Soccerway

== Relegation play-off ==
19 March 2022
18:30 UTC+3

Al-Sailiya	3–2	Al Kharaitiyat

Thani bin Jassim Stadium

== Season statistics ==
=== Top scorers ===
As of 2 March 2022

Rank	Player	Club	Goals
1	(Kenya) Michael Olunga	Al Duhail	25
2	(Ghana) André Ayew	Al Sadd	15
3	(Qatar) Akram Afif	Al Sadd	14
4	(Algeria) Baghdad Bounedjah	Al Sadd	13
5	(Angola) Gelson Dala	Al-Wakrah	11
5	(Iraq) Aymen Hussein	Umm Salal	11
7	(Mali) Cheick Diabaté	Al-Gharafa	10
8	(Algeria) Mohamed Benyettou	Al-Wakrah	9
9	(Colombia) Jeison Medina	Al-Shamal	8
9	(Qatar) Sebastián Soria	Qatar SC	8
