= 2017–18 Al Sadd SC season =

Al Sadd SC
2017–18 season
- Chairman: Muhammed bin Khalifa Al Thani
- Head coach: Jesualdo Ferreira
- Stadium: Jassim Bin Hamad Stadium
- Qatar Stars League: Runners–up
- Emir of Qatar Cup: Semi-final
- Qatar Crown Prince Cup: Runners–up
- Sheikh Jassim Cup: winners
- Champions League: Quarter-final
- Top goalscorer: League: Baghdad Bounedjah (16); All: Baghdad Bounedjah (28)
| Home colours | Away colours |

In the 2017–18 season, Al Sadd SC competed in the Qatar Stars League for the 45th season, as well as the Emir of Qatar Cup the Qatar Crown Prince Cup the Sheikh Jassim Cup and the Champions League.

== Pre-season and friendlies ==
| 8 October 2017 Friendly | Al Sadd (Qatar) | 1-2 | (Turkey) Trabzonspor | Doha |
| 18:00 UTC+3 | Khoukhi 81' | Report | 34' Castillo; 55' Demirok | Stadium: Abdullah bin Khalifa Stadium |

== Competitions ==
=== Overview ===
| Competition | Record | | | | | | | | Started round | Final position / round | First match | Last match |
| Competition | G | W | D | L | GF | GA | GD | Win % | Started round | Final position / round | First match | Last match |
|---|---|---|---|---|---|---|---|---|---|---|---|---|
| Qatar Stars League | 22 | 16 | 1 | 5 | 68 | 25 | +43 | 72.73 | Matchday 1 | Runners–up | 16 September 2017 | 7 April 2018 |
| Emir of Qatar Cup | 2 | 1 | 0 | 1 | 4 | 1 | +3 | 50.00 | Quarter-final | Semi-final | 3 May 2018 | 11 May 2018 |
| Qatar Crown Prince Cup | 2 | 0 | 1 | 1 | 3 | 4 | −1 | 0.00 | Semi-finals | Runners–up | 22 April 2018 | 27 April 2018 |
| Sheikh Jassim Cup | 1 | 1 | 0 | 0 | 4 | 2 | +2 | 100.00 | Final | winners | 9 September 2017 | |
| Champions League | 8 | 5 | 1 | 2 | 15 | 8 | +7 | 62.50 | Group stage | Quarter-final | 13 February 2018 | 14 May 2018 |
| Total | 35 | 23 | 3 | 9 | 94 | 40 | +54 | 65.71 | | | | |

Updated to match played 16 May 2018
Source: Competitions

=== Qatar Stars League ===
==== League table ====
| Pos | Team | Pld | W | D | L | GF | GA | GD | Pts | Qualification or relegation |
|---|---|---|---|---|---|---|---|---|---|---|
| 1 | Al Duhail | 22 | 19 | 3 | 0 | 86 | 27 | +59 | 60 | Qualification to 2019 AFC Champions League group stage |
| 2 | Al Sadd | 22 | 16 | 1 | 5 | 68 | 25 | +43 | 49 | Qualification to 2019 AFC Champions League group stage |
| 3 | Al-Rayyan | 22 | 13 | 4 | 5 | 54 | 39 | +15 | 43 | Qualification to 2019 AFC Champions League play-off round |
| 4 | Al-Gharafa | 22 | 10 | 5 | 7 | 43 | 34 | +9 | 35 | Qualification to 2019 AFC Champions League play-off round |
| 5 | Umm Salal | 22 | 8 | 9 | 5 | 33 | 34 | −1 | 33 | |

Updated to match(es) played on 4 April. Source: RSSSF, Qatar Stars League, and FIFA
Rules for classification: 1) Points; 2) Goal difference; 3) Number of goals scored;

==== Results summary ====
| Overall | | | | | | | | Home | | | | | | Away | | | | | |
| Pld | W | D | L | GF | GA | GD | Pts | W | D | L | GF | GA | GD | W | D | L | GF | GA | GD |
|---|---|---|---|---|---|---|---|---|---|---|---|---|---|---|---|---|---|---|---|
| 22 | 16 | 1 | 5 | 68 | 25 | +43 | 49 | 8 | 1 | 3 | 37 | 12 | +25 | 8 | 0 | 2 | 31 | 13 | +18 |

Last updated: 29 December 2014.
Source: Competitive matches

==== Results by round ====
| Round | 1 | 2 | 3 | 4 | 5 | 6 | 7 | 8 | 9 | 10 | 11 | 12 | 13 | 14 | 15 | 16 | 17 | 18 | 19 | 20 | 21 | 22 |
|---|---|---|---|---|---|---|---|---|---|---|---|---|---|---|---|---|---|---|---|---|---|---|
| Ground | A | A | H | H | A | H | A | H | H | A | A | H | H | A | A | A | H | H | A | A | H | H |
| Result | W | W | W | W | W | L | W | W | L | W | W | D | W | W | W | W | W | W | L | L | L | W |
| Position | 1 | 2 | 2 | 2 | 2 | 3 | 3 | 3 | 3 | 2 | 2 | 2 | 2 | 2 | 2 | 2 | 2 | 2 | 2 | 2 | 2 | 2 |

Source: Competitive matches
A = Away; H = Home; W = Win; D = Draw; L = Loss

==== Matches ====
| 16 September 2017 Round 1 | Al Markhiya | 0 – 3 | Al-Sadd | Doha |
| 17:00 UTC+3 | Salah Al-Neel 82', 85' | Report | 20' Xavi | Stadium: Grand Hamad Stadium; Referee: Abdulhadi Al Rowaily |

| 22 September 2017 Round 2 | Al-Sailiya | 2 – 3 | Al-Sadd | Doha |
| 19:00 UTC+3 | Al-Ali 13'; Abdukholiqov 83' (pen.) | Report | 17' Xavi; 32' Hamroun; 63' Khoukhi | Stadium: Hamad bin Khalifa Stadium; Referee: Abdulrahman Ibrahim Al Jassim |

| 29 September 2017 Round 3 | Al-Sadd | 2 – 1 | Al-Gharafa | Doha |
| 18:55 UTC+3 | Khoukhi 56'; Pouraliganji 86' | Report | 29' (pen.) Jiménez | Stadium: Jassim Bin Hamad Stadium; Referee: Khamis Mohamed Al Kuwari |

| 15 October 2017 Round 4 | Al-Sadd | 3 – 1 | Qatar SC | Doha |
| 18:40 UTC+3 | Pouraliganji 24'; Bounedjah 62'; Al-Haidos 86' | Report | 60' Tayyebi | Stadium: Jassim Bin Hamad Stadium; Referee: Abdullah Al Athbah |

| 20 October 2017 Round 5 | Al-Arabi | 1 – 3 | Al-Sadd | Doha |
| 18:35 UTC+3 | Jardel 43' | Report | 4' Bounedjah; 26' Pedro Miguel; 90+2' Assadalla | Stadium: Grand Hamad Stadium; Referee: Abdulrahman Ibrahim Al Jassim |

| 27 October 2017 Round 6 | Al-Sadd | 1 – 2 | Al-Rayyan | Doha |
| 18:30 UTC+3 | Bounedjah 12' | Report | 55' Hamdallah; 71' Myong-jin | Stadium: Jassim Bin Hamad Stadium; Referee: Milorad Mažić (Serbia) |

| 2 November 2017 Round 7 | Al-Ahli | 1 – 2 | Al-Sadd | Doha |
| 17:25 UTC+3 | Abdullah 90' | Report | 7' Bounedjah; 18' Al-Haidos | Stadium: Hamad bin Khalifa Stadium; Referee: Khamis Mohamed Al Kuwari |

| 19 November 2017 Round 8 | Al-Sadd | 4 – 1 | Umm Salal | Doha |
| 14:00 UTC+3 | Xavi 39'; Bounedjah 52' (pen.); Pouraliganji 84'; Hamroun 89' | Report | 9' (o.g.) Hamroun | Stadium: Jassim Bin Hamad Stadium; Referee: Abdulrahman Ibrahim Al Jassim |

| 24 November 2017 Round 9 | Al-Sadd | 2 – 4 | Al-Duhail | Doha |
| 16:10 UTC+3 | Bounedjah 12'; Ahmad 80' | Report | 6' Ali; 20' El-Arabi; 72' Al Rawi; 89' Tae-hee | Stadium: Jassim Bin Hamad Stadium; Referee: István Vad (Hungary) |

| 1 December 2017 Round 10 | Al-Khor | 2 – 3 | Al-Sadd | Doha |
| 16:10 UTC+3 | Rafiei 59'; Mubarak 70' | Report | 15', 56' Xavi; 89' (pen.) Hamroun | Stadium: Khalifa International Stadium; Referee: Khamis Mohamed Al Kuwari |

| 7 December 2017 Round 11 | Al-Kharaitiyat | 0 – 4 | Al-Sadd | Al Khor |
| 16:10 UTC+3 | | Report | 40' Pedro Miguel; 52' (pen.), 81' Al-Haidos; 77' Hamroun | Stadium: Al-Khor SC Stadium; Referee: Abdullah Al Athbah |

| 13 January 2018 Round 12 | Al-Sadd | 0 – 0 | Al Markhiya | Doha |
| 16:30 UTC+3 | | Report | | Stadium: Jassim Bin Hamad Stadium; Referee: Khamis Mohamed Al Kuwari |

| 20 January 2018 Round 13 | Al-Sadd | 6 – 0 | Al-Sailiya | Doha |
| 14:25 UTC+3 | Hamroun 32', 38'; Ismail 64'; Al-Haidos 65', 82' (pen.); Assadalla 68' | Report | | Stadium: Jassim Bin Hamad Stadium; Referee: Salman Ahmad Flahi |

| 25 January 2018 Round 14 | Al-Gharafa | 0 – 4 | Al-Sadd | Doha |
| 16:40 UTC+3 | | Report | 33', 45+1' Hamroun; 73', 87' Al-Haidos | Stadium: Thani bin Jassim Stadium; Referee: Ovidiu Hațegan (Romania) |

| 3 February 2018 Round 15 | Qatar SC | 1 – 3 | Al-Sadd | Doha |
| 16:45 UTC+3 | | Report | 24' Xavi; 43' Ahmad; 45+3' Ismail | Stadium: Jassim Bin Hamad Stadium; Referee: Saoud Al Athbah |

| 8 February 2018 Round 16 | Al-Rayyan | 0 – 2 | Al-Sadd | Doha |
| 16:50 UTC+3 | | Report | 44' Hamroun; 79' Bounedjah | Stadium: Jassim Bin Hamad Stadium; Referee: Salman Ahmad Flahi |

| 17 February 2018 Round 17 | Al-Sadd | 5 – 1 | Al-Arabi | Doha |
| 16:55 UTC+3 | Al-Haidos 7', 9', 79' (pen.); Hassan 57'; Bounedjah 60' | Report | 10' Jardel | Stadium: Jassim Bin Hamad Stadium; Referee: Abdulrahman Al Jassim |

| 25 February 2018 Round 18 | Al-Sadd | 5 – 0 | Al-Ahli | Doha |
| 14:50 UTC+3 | Bounedjah 5', 58', 76', 82'; Hamroun 90+2' | Report | | Stadium: Jassim Bin Hamad Stadium; Referee: Abdulhadi Al Asmar Al Ruaile (Hungary) |

| 1 March 2018 Round 19 | Al-Duhail | 4 – 3 | Al-Sadd | Doha |
| 16:00 UTC+3 | Mohammad 37'; Msakni 40', 88'; El-Arabi 90+4' | Report | 11' Hamroun; 71', 81' Bounedjah | Stadium: Abdullah bin Khalifa Stadium; Referee: Szymon Marciniak (Poland) |

| 9 March 2018 Round 20 | Umm Salal | 2 – 1 | Al-Sadd | Doha |
| 16:00 UTC+3 | Khoukhi 49' (o.g.); Darragi 66' | Report | 11' Ahmad | Stadium: Thani bin Jassim Stadium; Referee: Saoud Al Athbah |

| 17 March 2018 Round 21 | Al-Sadd | 0 – 1 | Al-Khor | Doha |
| 16:05 UTC+3 | | Report | 85' Khalifah | Stadium: Jassim Bin Hamad Stadium; Referee: Saoud Al Athbah |

| 7 April 2018 Round 22 | Al-Sadd | 9 – 1 | Al-Kharaitiyat | Doha |
| 16:15 UTC+3 | Bounedjah 20', 42'; Assadalla 33', 72'; Afif 36', 45+1', 54'; Al-Haidos 73'; Hamroun 85' (pen.) | Report | 79' Al-Shammeri | Stadium: Jassim Bin Hamad Stadium; Referee: Ali Faisal Al Haddad |

=== Emir of Qatar Cup ===
| 3 May 2018 Quarter-finals | Al-Sadd | 4 – 0 | Al-Khor | Doha |
| 17:15 | Ferydoon 37'; Pedro 53'; Abubakar 67'; Afif 90' | Report | | Stadium: Abdullah bin Khalifa Stadium; Referee: Khamis Mohamed Al Kuwari |

| 11 May 2018 Semi-finals | Al-Sadd | 0 – 1 | Al-Duhail | Doha |
| 19:00 | | Report | 68' Ali | Stadium: Jassim Bin Hamad Stadium; Referee: Salman Ahmad Flahi |

=== Crown Prince Cup ===
| 22 April 2018 Semi-finals | Al-Sadd | 2 – 2 (4–2 p) | Al Rayyan | Doha |
| 19:00 | Afif 21'; Ismail 29' | Report | 43' Moutouali; 81' Tabata | Stadium: Jassim Bin Hamad Stadium; Referee: Salman Ahmad Flahi |
| | Penalties |
| | Al-Haidos (penalty scored); Khoukhi (penalty scored); Hamroun (penalty scored); Bounedjah (penalty scored) | | (penalty missed) Soria; (penalty scored) Myong-jin; (penalty scored) Viera; (penalty missed) Tabata |

| 27 April 2018 Final | Al-Sadd | 1 – 2 | Al-Duhail | Doha |
| 19:00 | Al-Haidos 19' | Report | 78' Mohammad; 90+10' (pen.) El-Arabi | Stadium: Jassim Bin Hamad Stadium; Referee: Abdullah Al Athbah |

=== Sheikh Jassim Cup ===
| 9 September 2017 | Al-Duhail | 2 – 4 | Al Sadd | Doha |
| 17:00 | Tae-hee 41'; Almoez 90+6' | Report | 5', 20', 66' Bounedjah; 80' (pen.) Hamroun | Stadium: Abdullah bin Khalifa Stadium; Referee: Abdulrahman Al Jassim |

== AFC Champions League ==
=== Group stage ===
==== Group C ====
| Pos | Team | Pld | W | D | L | GF | GA | GD | Pts | Qualification | PER | SAD | NSF | WAS |
|---|---|---|---|---|---|---|---|---|---|---|---|---|---|---|
| 1 | (Iran) Persepolis | 6 | 4 | 1 | 1 | 8 | 3 | +5 | 13 | Advance to knockout stage | — | 1–0 | 3–0 | 2–0 |
| 2 | (Qatar) Al-Sadd | 6 | 4 | 0 | 2 | 11 | 5 | +6 | 12 | Advance to knockout stage | 3–1 | — | 4–0 | 2–1 |
| 3 | (Uzbekistan) Nasaf Qarshi | 6 | 3 | 1 | 2 | 4 | 8 | −4 | 10 | | 0–0 | 1–0 | — | 1–0 |
| 4 | (United Arab Emirates) Al-Wasl | 6 | 0 | 0 | 6 | 3 | 10 | −7 | 0 | | 0–1 | 1–2 | 1–2 | — |

Source: AFC

| 13 February 2018 | Al-Wasl (United Arab Emirates) | 1–2 | (Qatar) Al-Sadd | Dubai |
| 19:00 UTC+4 | Fabio Lima 26' | Report | 79', 90' Bounedjah | Stadium: Zabeel Stadium; Attendance: 5,895; Referee: Ko Hyung-jin (South Korea) |

| 20 February 2018 | Al-Sadd (Qatar) | 3–1 | (Iran) Persepolis | Doha |
| 18:30 UTC+3 | Bounedjah 36', 51'; Khoukhi 66' | Report | 90+4' Nemati | Stadium: Jassim bin Hamad Stadium; Attendance: 5,842; Referee: Muhammad Taqi (Singapore) |

| 5 March 2018 | Nasaf Qarshi (Uzbekistan) | 1–0 | (Qatar) Al-Sadd | Qarshi |
| 18:30 UTC+5 | Ganiev 62' (pen.) | Report | | Stadium: Qarshi Markaziy Stadium; Attendance: 20,978; Referee: Jumpei Iida (Japan) |

| 13 March 2018 | Al-Sadd (Qatar) | 4–0 | (Uzbekistan) Nasaf Qarshi | Doha |
| 18:15 UTC+3 | Xavi 3'; Hassan 15'; Bounedjah 43'; Hamroun 71' | Report | | Stadium: Jassim bin Hamad Stadium; Attendance: 4,133; Referee: Ahmed Al-Kaf (Oman) |

| 2 April 2018 | Al-Sadd (Qatar) | 2–1 | (United Arab Emirates) Al-Wasl | Doha |
| 19:00 UTC+3 | Bounedjah 9', 53' | Report | 90+2' Caio | Stadium: Jassim bin Hamad Stadium; Attendance: 5,169; Referee: Ryuji Sato (Japan) |

| 16 April 2018 | Persepolis (Iran) | 1–0 | (Qatar) Al-Sadd | Tehran |
| 19:30 UTC+4:30 | Pouraliganji 3' (o.g.) | Report | | Stadium: Azadi Stadium; Attendance: 32,170; Referee: Hettikamkanamge Perera (Sri Lanka) |

== Knockout stage ==
=== Round of 16 ===
| 7 May 2018 | Al-Sadd (Qatar) | 2–1 | (Saudi Arabia) Al-Ahli | Doha |
| 19:15 UTC+3 | Khoukhi 3', 28' | Live Report | Assiri 47' | Stadium: Jassim bin Hamad Stadium; Attendance: 3,613; Referee: Chris Beath (Australia) |

| 14 May 2018 | Al-Ahli (Saudi Arabia) | 2–2 | (Qatar) Al-Sadd | Jeddah |
| 20:40 UTC+3 | Claudemir 9'; Assiri 39' | http://www.the-afc.com/competitions/afc-champions-league/matches/2018/982300 Live Report] | Bounedjah 2', 70' | Stadium: King Abdullah Sports City; Attendance: 24,150; Referee: Fu Ming (China) |

== Squad information ==
=== Playing statistics ===
| No. | Pos | Nat | Player | Total | | Qatar Stars League | | Emir of Qatar Cup | | Crown Prince Cup | | Sheikh Jassim Cup | | Champions League | |
| No. | Pos | Nat | Player | Apps | Goals | Apps | Goals | Apps | Goals | Apps | Goals | Apps | Goals | Apps | Goals |
|---|---|---|---|---|---|---|---|---|---|---|---|---|---|---|---|
| 1 | GK | (Qatar) QAT | Saad Al Sheeb | 30 | 0 | 17 | 0 | 2 | 0 | 2 | 0 | 1 | 0 | 8 | 0 |
| 22 | GK | (Qatar) QAT | Meshaal Barsham | 5 | 0 | 5 | 0 | 0 | 0 | 0 | 0 | 0 | 0 | 0 | 0 |
| 20 | DF | (Qatar) QAT | Salem Al-Hajri | 29 | 0 | 16 | 0 | 2 | 0 | 2 | 0 | 1 | 0 | 8 | 0 |
| 34 | DF | (Qatar) QAT | Hatim Kamal Hassanin | 2 | 0 | 1 | 0 | 0 | 0 | 0 | 0 | 1 | 0 | 0 | 0 |
| 2 | DF | (Qatar) QAT | Pedro Miguel | 28 | 3 | 16 | 2 | 2 | 1 | 2 | 0 | 1 | 0 | 7 | 0 |
| 3 | DF | (Qatar) QAT | Yasser Abubakar | 32 | 1 | 20 | 0 | 2 | 1 | 2 | 0 | 0 | 0 | 8 | 0 |
| 7 | DF | (Qatar) QAT | Musab Kheder | 20 | 0 | 17 | 0 | 1 | 0 | 0 | 0 | 1 | 0 | 1 | 0 |
| 12 | DF | (Qatar) QAT | Hamid Ismail | 19 | 3 | 8 | 2 | 1 | 0 | 2 | 1 | 0 | 0 | 8 | 0 |
| 14 | DF | (Qatar) QAT | Abdelkarim Hassan | 16 | 2 | 8 | 1 | 2 | 0 | 1 | 0 | 0 | 0 | 5 | 1 |
| 15 | DF | (Qatar) QAT | Fahad Al-Abdulrahman | 11 | 0 | 11 | 0 | 0 | 0 | 0 | 0 | 0 | 0 | 0 | 0 |
| 24 | DF | (Iran) IRI | Morteza Pouraliganji | 28 | 3 | 18 | 3 | 2 | 0 | 2 | 0 | 0 | 0 | 6 | 0 |
| 74 | MF | (Qatar) QAT | Ghassan Waheed | 2 | 0 | 1 | 0 | 0 | 0 | 0 | 0 | 1 | 0 | 0 | 0 |
| 16 | MF | (Qatar) QAT | Boualem Khoukhi | 29 | 5 | 17 | 2 | 2 | 0 | 2 | 0 | 1 | 0 | 7 | 3 |
| 4 | MF | (Qatar) QAT | Ahmed Sayyar | 16 | 0 | 12 | 0 | 2 | 0 | 0 | 0 | 1 | 0 | 1 | 0 |
| 6 | MF | (Spain) ESP | Xavi | 28 | 7 | 18 | 6 | 0 | 0 | 2 | 0 | 1 | 0 | 7 | 1 |
| 5 | MF | (Algeria) ALG | Jugurtha Hamroun | 29 | 14 | 19 | 12 | 1 | 0 | 2 | 0 | 1 | 1 | 6 | 1 |
| 87 | MF | (Qatar) QAT | Saud Ibrahim Al-Nasr | 4 | 0 | 3 | 0 | 0 | 0 | 0 | 0 | 1 | 0 | 0 | 0 |
| 8 | MF | (Qatar) QAT | Ali Assadalla | 25 | 4 | 20 | 4 | 0 | 0 | 0 | 0 | 0 | 0 | 5 | 0 |
| 37 | MF | (Qatar) QAT | Ahmed Suhail | 19 | 0 | 10 | 0 | 2 | 0 | 0 | 0 | 0 | 0 | 7 | 0 |
| 82 | MF | (Qatar) QAT | Ali Alrayami | 1 | 0 | 1 | 0 | 0 | 0 | 0 | 0 | 0 | 0 | 0 | 0 |
| 82 | MF | (Qatar) QAT | Bahaa Ellethy | 2 | 0 | 2 | 0 | 0 | 0 | 0 | 0 | 0 | 0 | 0 | 0 |
| 11 | FW | (Algeria) ALG | Baghdad Bounedjah | 22 | 28 | 11 | 16 | 0 | 0 | 2 | 0 | 1 | 3 | 8 | 9 |
| 10 | MF | (Qatar) QAT | Hassan Al-Haidos | 32 | 13 | 21 | 12 | 2 | 0 | 2 | 1 | 1 | 0 | 6 | 0 |
| 96 | MF | (Qatar) QAT | Akram Afif | 19 | 5 | 7 | 3 | 2 | 1 | 2 | 1 | 0 | 0 | 8 | 0 |
| 17 | FW | (Qatar) QAT | Hassan Palang | 14 | 3 | 12 | 3 | 1 | 0 | 0 | 0 | 0 | 0 | 1 | 0 |
| 18 | FW | (Qatar) QAT | Abdulaziz Al-Jalabi | 1 | 0 | 1 | 0 | 0 | 0 | 0 | 0 | 0 | 0 | 0 | 0 |
| 99 | FW | (Iran) IRI | Ali Ferydoon | 7 | 1 | 6 | 0 | 1 | 1 | 0 | 0 | 0 | 0 | 0 | 0 |
Players transferred out during the season
| 9 | FW | (Qatar) QAT | Meshaal Al-Shammeri | 8 | 0 | 7 | 0 | 0 | 0 | 0 | 0 | 1 | 0 | 0 | 0 |

Last updated: 7 April 2018
Source: fr.soccerway.com

=== Goalscorers ===
Includes all competitive matches. The list is sorted alphabetically by surname when total goals are equal.

| No. | Nat. | Player | Pos. | QSL | QEC | CPC | SJC | CL 1 | TOTAL |
|---|---|---|---|---|---|---|---|---|---|
| 11 | (Algeria) | Baghdad Bounedjah | FW | 16 | 0 | 0 | 3 | 9 | 28 |
| 5 | (Algeria) | Jugurtha Hamroun | MF | 12 | 0 | 0 | 1 | 1 | 14 |
| 10 | (Qatar) | Hassan Al-Haidos | FW | 12 | 0 | 1 | 0 | 0 | 13 |
| 6 | (Spain) | Xavi | MF | 6 | 0 | 0 | 0 | 1 | 7 |
| 96 | (Qatar) | Akram Afif | FW | 3 | 1 | 1 | 0 | 0 | 5 |
| 16 | (Qatar) | Boualem Khoukhi | MF | 2 | 0 | 0 | 0 | 3 | 5 |
| 8 | (Qatar) | Ali Assadalla | MF | 4 | 0 | 0 | 0 | 0 | 4 |
| 88 | (Iran) | Morteza Pouraliganji | DF | 3 | 0 | 0 | 0 | 0 | 3 |
| 17 | (Qatar) | Hassan Palang | FW | 3 | 0 | 0 | 0 | 0 | 3 |
| 12 | (Qatar) | Hamid Ismail | DF | 2 | 0 | 1 | 0 | 0 | 3 |
| 2 | (Qatar) | Pedro Miguel | DF | 2 | 1 | 0 | 0 | 0 | 3 |
| 14 | (Qatar) | Abdelkarim Hassan | DF | 1 | 0 | 0 | 0 | 1 | 2 |
| 99 | (Qatar) | Ali Ferydoon | FW | 0 | 1 | 0 | 0 | 0 | 1 |
| 3 | (Qatar) | Yasser Abubakar | DF | 0 | 1 | 0 | 0 | 0 | 1 |
| Own Goals | | | | 0 | 0 | 0 | 0 | 0 | 0 |
| Totals | | | | 68 | 4 | 3 | 4 | 15 | 94 |

== Players ==
Note: Flags indicate national team as defined under FIFA eligibility rules; some limited exceptions apply. Players may hold more than one non-FIFA nationality.

| No. | Pos. | Nation | Player |
|---|---|---|---|
| 1 | GK | QAT | Saad Al Sheeb |
| 2 | DF | QAT | Pedro Miguel |
| 3 | DF | QAT | Yasser Abubakar |
| 4 | MF | QAT | Ahmed Sayyar |
| 5 | MF | ALG | Jugurtha Hamroun |
| 6 | MF | ESP | Xavi (captain) |
| 7 | DF | QAT | Musab Kheder |
| 8 | MF | QAT | Ali Assadalla |
| 9 | FW | QAT | Meshaal Al-Shammeri |
| 10 | MF | QAT | Hassan Al-Haidos |
| 11 | FW | ALG | Baghdad Bounedjah |
| 12 | DF | QAT | Hamid Ismail |
| 13 | DF | QAT | Ibrahim Majid |
| 15 | DF | QAT | Fahad Al-Abdulrahman |
| 16 | MF | QAT | Boualem Khoukhi |
| 17 | FW | QAT | Hassan Palang |
| 18 | FW | QAT | Abdulaziz Al-Jalabi |

| No. | Pos. | Nation | Player |
|---|---|---|---|
| 19 | MF | QAT | Hussain Bahzad |
| 20 | DF | QAT | Salem Al-Hajri |
| 21 | GK | QAT | Saud Al Hajiri |
| 22 | GK | QAT | Meshaal Barsham |
| 23 | MF | QAT | Ayoub Mashhor |
| 24 | DF | IRI | Morteza Pouraliganji |
| 25 | FW | QAT | Jassim Al-Shammeri |
| 27 | MF | QAT | Meshal Ibrahim |
| 30 | GK | QAT | Jehad Hudib |
| 34 | DF | QAT | Hatim Kamal Hassanin |
| 37 | DF | QAT | Ahmed Suhail |
| 73 | MF | QAT | Mohammed Waad |
| 74 | MF | QAT | Ghassan Waheed |
| 87 | MF | QAT | Saud Ibrahim Al-Nasr |
| 88 | MF | LBA | Aladeen Younes |
| 92 | GK | OMA | Sami Al-Hassawi |
| 99 | FW | QAT | Ali Ferydoon (on loan from Al-Shamal) |

Players with Multiple Nationalities

- (Qatar) (Palestine) Ibrahim Majid
- (Qatar) (Portugal) Pedro Miguel
- (Qatar) (Sudan) Yasser Abubakar
- (Qatar) (Bahrain) Ali Asad
- (Qatar) (Bahrain) Ahmed Sayyar
- (Qatar) (Iran) Hussain Bahzad
- (Qatar) (Iran) Ali Ferydoon
- (Qatar) (Algeria) Boualem Khoukhi

== Transfers ==
=== In ===
| Date | Pos | Player | From club | Transfer fee | Source |
|---|---|---|---|---|---|
| 23 May 2017 | MF | (Qatar) Boualem Khoukhi | (Qatar) Al-Arabi | Undisclosed | |
| 25 May 2017 | MF | (Algeria) Jugurtha Hamroun | (Romania) Steaua București | €1,000,000 | |
| 31 May 2017 | GK | (Qatar) Saud Al Hajiri | (Qatar) Al-Rayyan | Undisclosed | |
| 30 June 2017 | DF | (Qatar) Musab Kheder | (Qatar) Al-Rayyan | Loan Return | |
| 30 June 2017 | DF | (Qatar) Fahad Al-Abdulrahman | (Belgium) Eupen | Loan Return | |
| 16 July 2017 | DF | (Qatar) Yasser Abubakar | (Qatar) El Jaish | Undisclosed | |

=== Out ===
| Date | Pos | Player | To club | Transfer fee | Source |
|---|---|---|---|---|---|
| 29 June 2017 | DF | (Qatar) Abdelkarim Hassan | (Belgium) Eupen | Loan | |
| 1 July 2017 | MF | (Qatar) Saleh Al Yazidi | (Qatar) Al-Markhiya | Loan | |
| 1 July 2017 | DF | (Qatar) Mohammed Kasola | (Qatar) Al-Rayyan | Loan | |
| 1 July 2017 | MF | (Qatar) Hamad Mansor | (Qatar) Al-Khor | Loan | |
| 14 July 2017 | FW | (Morocco) Hamza Sanhaji | (Belgium) Eupen | Loan | |
