= 2018–19 Al Sadd SC season =

Al Sadd SC
2018–19 season
- Chairman: Muhammed bin Khalifa Al Thani
- Head coach: Jesualdo Ferreira
- Stadium: Jassim Bin Hamad Stadium
- Qatar Stars League: Champion
- Emir of Qatar Cup: Runners–up
- Champions League: 2018: Semi-final; 2019: Group stage
- Top goalscorer: League: Baghdad Bounedjah (39); All: Baghdad Bounedjah (43)
| Home colours | Away colours |

In the 2018–19 season, Al Sadd SC is competing in the Qatar Stars League for the 46th season, as well as the Emir of Qatar Cup and the Champions League.

== Pre-season and friendlies ==
It is decided that the first football team of the Al Sadd Club will leave for Austria to enter the camp on July 12 until the 28th of this month as part of preparations for the 2018–19 season. The team will play 3 friendly matches during the next period, during July 19 for the first friendly, July 23 for the second, and finally the third on July 27.

| 19 July 2018 Friendly | Al Sadd | 1–4 | (Germany) MSV Duisburg | St. Johann in Tirol |
| 19:00 UTC+2 | Hamroun 79' | Report | Stoppelkamp 12'; Al-Hamawende 48' (o.g.); Wolze 63', 90' | Stadium: Koasastadion St. Johann |

| 23 July 2018 Friendly | Al Sadd | Cancelled | (Germany) SC Freiburg | St. Johann in Tirol |
| 18:00 UTC+2 | | Report | | Stadium: Koasastadion St. Johann |

== Competitions ==
=== Overview ===
| Competition | Record | | | | | | | | Started round | Final position / round | First match | Last match |
| Competition | G | W | D | L | GF | GA | GD | Win % | Started round | Final position / round | First match | Last match |
|---|---|---|---|---|---|---|---|---|---|---|---|---|
| Qatar Stars League | 22 | 18 | 3 | 1 | 100 | 22 | +78 | 81.82 | Matchday 1 | Winner | 5 August 2018 | 13 April 2019 |
| Emir of Qatar Cup | 3 | 2 | 0 | 1 | 7 | 6 | +1 | 66.67 | Quarter Final | Runners–up | 2 May 2019 | 16 May 2019 |
| Champions League | 4 | 1 | 2 | 1 | 6 | 5 | +1 | 25.00 | Quarter-final | Semi-final | 27 August 2018 | 23 October 2018 |
| Champions League | 4 | 2 | 1 | 1 | 5 | 5 | +0 | 50.00 | Group stage (Note: The competition will be completed in the new season 2019–20 starting from Round of 16.) | | 5 March 2019 | 20 May 2019 |
| Total | 33 | 23 | 6 | 4 | 118 | 38 | +80 | 69.70 | | | | |

Updated to match played 16 May 2019
Source: Competitions

=== Qatar Stars League ===
==== League table ====
| Pos | Team | Pld | W | D | L | GF | GA | GD | Pts | Qualification or relegation |
|---|---|---|---|---|---|---|---|---|---|---|
| 1 | Al Sadd (C) | 22 | 18 | 3 | 1 | 100 | 22 | +78 | 57 | Qualification for AFC Champions League group stage and FIFA Club World Cup first round (Note: The league champions will qualify for the FIFA Club World Cup first round unless the 2019 AFC Champions League winners are from Qatar.) |
| 2 | Al Duhail | 22 | 15 | 5 | 2 | 52 | 17 | +35 | 50 | Qualification for AFC Champions League group stage (Note: Al Duhail qualified for the AFC Champions League group stage as Emir of Qatar Cup winners.) |
| 3 | Al-Sailiya | 22 | 12 | 2 | 8 | 38 | 26 | +12 | 38 | Qualification for AFC Champions League play-off round |
| 4 | Al-Rayyan | 22 | 10 | 7 | 5 | 34 | 31 | +3 | 37 | Qualification for AFC Champions League play-off round |
| 5 | Al Ahli | 22 | 10 | 4 | 8 | 32 | 39 | −7 | 34 | |

Source: QSL
Rules for classification: 1) Points; 2) Goal difference; 3) Number of goals scored;
(C) Champions

==== Results summary ====
| Overall | | | | | | | | Home | | | | | | Away | | | | | |
| Pld | W | D | L | GF | GA | GD | Pts | W | D | L | GF | GA | GD | W | D | L | GF | GA | GD |
|---|---|---|---|---|---|---|---|---|---|---|---|---|---|---|---|---|---|---|---|
| 22 | 18 | 3 | 1 | 100 | 22 | +78 | 57 | 9 | 2 | 0 | 58 | 11 | +47 | 9 | 1 | 1 | 42 | 11 | +31 |

Last updated: 19 April 2019.
Source: Competitive matches

==== Results by round ====
| Round | 1 | 2 | 3 | 4 | 5 | 6 | 7 | 8 | 9 | 10 | 11 | 12 | 13 | 14 | 15 | 16 | 17 | 18 | 19 | 20 | 21 | 22 |
|---|---|---|---|---|---|---|---|---|---|---|---|---|---|---|---|---|---|---|---|---|---|---|
| Ground | A | H | H | H | A | H | A | H | H | A | A | H | A | A | A | H | A | H | A | A | H | H |
| Result | W | W | D | W | W | W | W | D | W | L | W | W | W | W | W | W | W | W | W | D | W | W |
| Position | 1 | 1 | 1 | 1 | 3 | 2 | 2 | 2 | 2 | 3 | 3 | 2 | 2 | 2 | 1 | 1 | 1 | 1 | 1 | 1 | 1 | 1 |

Updated to match(es) played on 13 April 2019. Source: Competitive matches
A = Away; H = Home; W = Win; D = Draw; L = Loss

==== Matches ====
| 5 August 2018 Round 1 | Al-Kharaitiyat | 0–6 | Al-Sadd | Doha |
| 18:35 | | Soccerway report | 8', 89' Afif; 59' (pen.), 83', 90+2' Bounedjah; 78' (o.g.) Abdurahman | Stadium: Khalifa International Stadium; Referee: Saoud Al Athbah |

| 12 August 2018 Round 2 | Al-Sadd | 10–1 | Al-Arabi | Doha |
| 20:40 | Abdulla 14' (o.g.); Afif 25', 85'; Bounedjah 43' (pen.), 47', 50', 62', 64', 72', 89' | Soccerway report | | Stadium: Jassim Bin Hamad Stadium; Referee: Abdulrahman Al Jassim |

| 19 August 2018 Round 3 | Al-Sadd | 1–1 | Al-Gharafa | Doha |
| 18:25 | Al-Haidos 90+5' | Soccerway report | Weiss 49' | Stadium: Jassim Bin Hamad Stadium; Referee: Khamis Mohamed Al Kuwari |

| 2 September 2018 Round 4 | Al-Sadd | 4–0 | Al-Shahania | Doha |
| 18:10 | Bounedjah 3'; Afif 8', 40'; Khoukhi 14' | Soccerway report | | Stadium: Jassim Bin Hamad Stadium; Referee: Abdulaziz Mousa |

| 22 September 2018 Round 6 | Al-Sadd | 5–0 | Al-Rayyan | Doha |
| 18:55 | Bounedjah 11', 70'; Hassan 31'; Afif 59'; Woo-young 79' | Soccerway report | | Stadium: Jassim Bin Hamad Stadium; Referee: Khamis Al Marri |

| 27 September 2018 Round 7 | Qatar SC | 1–5 | Al-Sadd | Doha |
| 21:00 | Eto'o 40' | Soccerway report | 13' Ismail; 20' Bounedjah; 29' Afif; 58' Xavi; 90+3' Sayyar | Stadium: Suheim bin Hamad Stadium; Referee: Mohammed Al-Shammari |

| 7 October 2018 Round 8 | Al-Sadd | 1–1 | Al-Sailiya | Doha |
| 20:50 | 66' Bounedjah | Soccerway report | Ilyas 87' (pen.) | Stadium: Jassim Bin Hamad Stadium; Referee: Abdulrahman Al Jassim |

| 27 October 2018 Round 10 | Al-Ahli | 4–1 | Al-Sadd | Doha |
| 19:20 | Ebrahimi 5', 63'; Moustafa 21'; Muntari 34' (pen.) | Soccerway report | 52' (pen.) Bounedjah | Stadium: Hamad bin Khalifa Stadium; Referee: Salman Ahmad Flahi |

| 2 November 2018 Round 11 | Umm Salal | 1–5 | Al-Sadd | Doha |
| 20:25 | Sagbo 33' | Soccerway report | 20' Pedro Miguel; 29' Al-Haidos; 55' Xavi; 69', 87' Afif | Stadium: Thani bin Jassim Stadium; Referee: Abdulhadi Al Rowaily |

| 8 November 2018 Round 12 | Al-Sadd | 7–1 | Al-Kharaitiyat | Doha |
| 20:20 | Bounedjah 17', 46', 86'; Ismail 18'; Hassan 38'; Afif 64' (pen.); Sayyar 90' | Soccerway report | 82' Saad | Stadium: Jassim Bin Hamad Stadium; Referee: Nayef Mohamed El-Kadiri |

| 24 November 2018 Round 13 | Al-Arabi | 0–3 | Al-Sadd | Doha |
| 19:30 | | Soccerway report | 7', 45+2' (pen.) Bounedjah; 49' (pen.) Al-Haidos | Stadium: Grand Hamad Stadium; Referee: Abdulhadi Al Rowaily |

| 28 November 2018 Round 5 | Al-Khor | 1–2 | Al-Sadd | Al Khor |
| 19:30 | Wágner 70' | Soccerway report | 16', 86' Bounedjah | Stadium: Al-Khor SC Stadium; Referee: Saoud Al Athbah |

| 2 December 2018 Round 14 | Al-Gharafa | 1–8 | Al-Sadd | Doha |
| 17:00 | Taremi 53' (pen.) | Soccerway report | 19', 28', 45+3' (pen.) Bounedjah; 24', 40', 58' Afif; 63' Al-Haidos; 86' Ahmad | Stadium: Thani bin Jassim Stadium; Referee: Mohammed Al-Shammari |

| 7 December 2018 Round 15 | Al-Shahania | 1–4 | Al-Sadd | Doha |
| 19:30 | Vázquez 42' | Soccerway report | 23', 90+2' Al-Haidos; 50', 76' Bounedjah | Stadium: Jassim Bin Hamad Stadium; Referee: Nayef Mohamed El-Kadiri |

| 11 December 2018 Round 9 | Al-Sadd | 3–1 | Al-Duhail | Doha |
| 19:30 | Mendes 9' (o.g.); Al-Hajri 89'; Bounedjah 90+4' | Soccerway report | 6' (pen.) El-Arabi | Stadium: Jassim Bin Hamad Stadium; Referee: Daniele Orsato (Italy) |

| 16 February 2019 Round 16 | Al-Sadd | 6–2 | Al-Khor | Doha |
| 20:10 | Afif 7', 10', 64'; Ismail 42'; Jung 55'; Bounedjah 57' | Soccerway report | 15' Wágner; 90+2' (pen.) Tiago Bezerra | Stadium: Jassim Bin Hamad Stadium; Referee: Abdulhadi Al Rowaily |

| 23 February 2019 Round 17 | Al-Rayyan | 0–4 | Al-Sadd | Doha |
| 20:10 | | Soccerway report | 33' Bounedjah; 35' Hassan; 62' (pen.), 72' Afif | Stadium: Jassim Bin Hamad Stadium; Referee: Khamis Mohamed Al Kuwari |

| 28 February 2019 Round 18 | Al-Sadd | 8–1 | Qatar SC | Doha |
| 21:10 | Abdelkarim Hassan 23'; Bounedjah 30' (pen.), 84', 90+3'; Afif 35', 58', 71'; Al-Haidos 45+3' (pen.) | Soccerway report | 52' Abdel-Rahman | Stadium: Jassim Bin Hamad Stadium; Referee: Mohammed Al-Shammari |

| 28 February 2019 Round 19 | Al-Sailiya | 0–2 | Al-Sadd | Doha |
| 18:00 | | Soccerway report | 18' Bounedjah; 84' Afif | Stadium: Hamad bin Khalifa Stadium; Referee: Saoud Al Athbah |

| 30 March 2019 Round 20 | Al-Duhail | 2–2 | Al-Sadd | Doha |
| 20:15 | El-Arabi 75', 85' (pen.) | Soccerway report | 26' Bounedjah; 90+5' (o.g.) Naji Hussein | Stadium: Abdullah bin Khalifa Stadium; Referee: Abdulrahman Al Jassim |

| 4 April 2019 Round 21 | Al-Sadd | 7–2 | Al-Ahli | Doha |
| 20:10 | Bounedjah 6' (pen.), 45+1', 81'; Al-Haidos 24', 75' (pen.); Afif 53'; Jung 90+4' | Soccerway report | 71' de Jong; 79' Umaru | Stadium: Jassim Bin Hamad Stadium; Referee: Nayef Mohamed El-Kadiri |

| 13 April 2019 Round 22 | Al-Sadd | 6–1 | Umm Salal | Doha |
| 20:20 | Khoukhi 30'; Al-Haidos 41' (pen.); Afif 63', 69'; Assadalla 65' | Soccerway report | 34' Sagbo | Stadium: Jassim Bin Hamad Stadium; Referee: Khamis Al Marri |

=== Emir of Qatar Cup ===
| 2 May 2019 Quarter-finals | Al-Sadd | 4–2 | Al-Gharafa | Doha |
| 21:00 | Khoukhi 17'; Bounedjah 45', 90+2'; Afif 75' | Report | 78' Taremi; 89' Seraj | Stadium: Abdullah bin Khalifa Stadium; Referee: Khamis Mohamed Al Kuwari |

| 11 May 2019 Semi-finals | Al-Rayyan | 0–2 | Al-Sadd | Doha |
| 22:30 | | Report | Asad 12'; Bounedjah 84' | Stadium: Jassim Bin Hamad Stadium; Referee: Salman Ahmad Flahi |

| 16 May 2019 Final | Al-Sadd | 1–4 | Al-Duhail | Al Wakrah |
| 22:30 | Akram Afif 7' | Report | Ali Afif 16'; Edmilson 59', 81'; El-Arabi 62' | Stadium: Al Wakrah Stadium; Attendance: 38,678; Referee: Abdulrahman Al Jassim |

=== 2018 AFC Champions League ===
==== Quarter-finals ====
| 27 August 2018 | Esteghlal (Iran) | 1–3 | (Qatar) Al-Sadd | Tehran |
| 20:30 UTC+4:30 | Barsham 12' (o.g.) | Live Report; Stat Report | 60' Afif; 65', 74' (pen.) Bounedjah | Stadium: Azadi Stadium; Attendance: 78,116; Referee: Ma Ning (China) |

| 17 September 2018 | Al-Sadd (Qatar) | 2–2 | (Iran) Esteghlal | Doha |
| 19:00 UTC+3 | Afif 27'; Bounedjah 90+2' (pen.) | Live Report; Stat Report | Bagheri 32'; Tabrizi 49' | Stadium: Jassim bin Hamad Stadium; Attendance: 6,462; Referee: Muhammad Taqi (Singapore) |

==== Semi-finals ====
| 2 October 2018 | Al-Sadd (Qatar) | 0–1 | (Iran) Persepolis | Doha |
| 18:15 UTC+3 | S. Al Sheeb (yellow card) 85' | Live Report; Stats Report | A. Alipour 86' (pen.); S. Nemati (yellow card) 77'; O. Alishah (yellow card) 39'; A. Beiranvand (yellow card) 76' | Stadium: Jassim bin Hamad Stadium; Attendance: 9,087; Referee: Hettikamkanamge Perera (Sri Lanka) |

| 23 October 2018 | Persepolis (Iran) | 1–1 | (Qatar) Al-Sadd | Tehran |
| 18:30 UTC+3:30 | Nemati 49' | Live Report; Stats Report | Bounedjah 17' | Stadium: Azadi Stadium; Attendance: 81,350; Referee: Valentin Kovalenko (Uzbekistan) |

=== 2019 AFC Champions League ===
==== Group D ====
| Pos | Team | Pld | W | D | L | GF | GA | GD | Pts | Qualification | SAD | AHL | PAK | PER |
|---|---|---|---|---|---|---|---|---|---|---|---|---|---|---|
| 1 | (Qatar) Al-Sadd | 6 | 3 | 1 | 2 | 7 | 8 | −1 | 10 | Advance to knockout stage | — | 2–1 | 2–1 | 1–0 |
| 2 | (Saudi Arabia) Al-Ahli | 6 | 3 | 0 | 3 | 7 | 7 | 0 | 9 | Advance to knockout stage | 2–0 | — | 2–1 | 2–1 |
| 3 | (Uzbekistan) Pakhtakor | 6 | 2 | 2 | 2 | 7 | 7 | 0 | 8 | | 2–2 | 1–0 | — | 1–0 |
| 4 | (Iran) Persepolis | 6 | 2 | 1 | 3 | 6 | 5 | +1 | 7 | | 2–0 | 2–0 | 1–1 | — |

Source: AFC

| 5 March 2019 1 | Al-Ahli (Saudi Arabia) | 2–0 | (Qatar) Al-Sadd | Jeddah |
| 20:15 UTC+3 | Al Somah 32' (pen.), 76' | Live Report; Stats Report | | Stadium: King Abdullah Sports City; Attendance: 7,328; Referee: Ahmed Al-Kaf (Oman) |

| 12 March 2019 2 | Al-Sadd (Qatar) | 1–0 | (Iran) Persepolis | Doha |
| 18:45 UTC+3 | Bounedjah 90+5' | Live Report; Stats Report | | Stadium: Jassim Bin Hamad Stadium; Attendance: 8,053; Referee: Kim Dong-jin (South Korea) |

| 9 April 2019 3 | Pakhtakor (Uzbekistan) | 2–2 | (Qatar) Al-Sadd | Tashkent |
| 19:00 UTC+5 | Alijonov 9'; Ćeran 41' | Live Report; Stats Report | Xavi 6', 16' | Stadium: Pakhtakor Central Stadium; Attendance: 32,315; Referee: Fu Ming (China) |

| 22 April 2019 4 | Al-Sadd (Qatar) | 2–1 | (Uzbekistan) Pakhtakor | Doha |
| 19:00 UTC+3 | Xavi 9'; Bounedjah 87' | Live Report; Stats Report | Krimets 30' | Stadium: Jassim Bin Hamad Stadium; Attendance: 4,692; Referee: Jumpei Iida (Japan) |

| 6 May 2019 5 | Al-Sadd (Qatar) | 2–1 | (Saudi Arabia) Al-Ahli | Doha |
| 21:45 UTC+3 | Asad 9'; Afif 12' | Live Report; Stats Report | Al Somah 51' (pen.) | Stadium: Jassim Bin Hamad Stadium; Attendance: 6,683; Referee: Ko Hyung-jin (South Korea) |

| 20 May 2019 6 | Persepolis (Iran) | 2–0 | (Qatar) Al-Sadd | Tehran |
| 21:00 UTC+4:30 | Torabi 16'; Alipour 67' | Live Report; Stats Report | | Stadium: Azadi Stadium; Attendance: 11,390; Referee: Hettikamkanamge Perera (Sri Lanka) |

== Squad information ==
=== Playing statistics ===
| No. | Pos | Nat | Player | Total | | Qatar Stars League | | Emir of Qatar Cup | | 2018 Champions League | | 2019 Champions League | |
| No. | Pos | Nat | Player | Apps | Goals | Apps | Goals | Apps | Goals | Apps | Goals | Apps | Goals |
|---|---|---|---|---|---|---|---|---|---|---|---|---|---|
| 1 | GK | (Qatar) QAT | Saad Al Sheeb | 15 | 0 | 12 | 0 | 2 | 0 | 1 | 0 | 0 | 0 |
| 22 | GK | (Qatar) QAT | Meshaal Barsham | 14 | 0 | 10 | 0 | 1 | 0 | 3 | 0 | 0 | 0 |
| 30 | GK | (Qatar) QAT | Jehad Hudib | 1 | 0 | 1 | 0 | 0 | 0 | 0 | 0 | 0 | 0 |
| 2 | DF | (Qatar) QAT | Pedro Miguel | 29 | 1 | 22 | 1 | 3 | 0 | 4 | 0 | 0 | 0 |
| 3 | DF | (Qatar) QAT | Abdelkarim Hassan | 21 | 4 | 14 | 4 | 3 | 0 | 4 | 0 | 0 | 0 |
| 7 | DF | (Qatar) QAT | Musab Kheder | 1 | 0 | 1 | 0 | 0 | 0 | 0 | 0 | 0 | 0 |
| 12 | DF | (Qatar) QAT | Hamid Ismail | 28 | 3 | 22 | 3 | 2 | 0 | 4 | 0 | 0 | 0 |
| 13 | DF | (Qatar) QAT | Ibrahim Majid | 3 | 0 | 3 | 0 | 0 | 0 | 0 | 0 | 0 | 0 |
| 15 | DF | (Qatar) QAT | Fahad Al-Abdulrahman | 0 | 0 | 0 | 0 | 0 | 0 | 0 | 0 | 0 | 0 |
| 19 | DF | (Qatar) QAT | Ahmed Suhail | 1 | 0 | 1 | 0 | 0 | 0 | 0 | 0 | 0 | 0 |
| 20 | DF | (Qatar) QAT | Salem Al-Hajri | 23 | 1 | 19 | 1 | 2 | 0 | 2 | 0 | 0 | 0 |
| 34 | DF | (Qatar) QAT | Hatim Kamal | 0 | 0 | 0 | 0 | 0 | 0 | 0 | 0 | 0 | 0 |
| 52 | DF | (Qatar) QAT | Hussain Bahzad | 1 | 0 | 1 | 0 | 0 | 0 | 0 | 0 | 0 | 0 |
| 66 | DF | (Qatar) QAT | Yasser Abubakar | 18 | 0 | 15 | 0 | 1 | 0 | 2 | 0 | 0 | 0 |
| 4 | MF | (Qatar) QAT | Ahmed Sayyar | 9 | 2 | 9 | 2 | 0 | 0 | 0 | 0 | 0 | 0 |
| 5 | MF | (South Korea) KOR | Jung Woo-young | 23 | 3 | 17 | 3 | 2 | 0 | 4 | 0 | 0 | 0 |
| 6 | MF | (Spain) ESP | Xavi | 21 | 2 | 14 | 2 | 3 | 0 | 4 | 0 | 0 | 0 |
| 8 | MF | (Qatar) QAT | Ali Assadalla | 22 | 2 | 17 | 1 | 3 | 1 | 2 | 0 | 0 | 0 |
| 14 | MF | (Spain) ESP | Gabi | 28 | 0 | 21 | 0 | 3 | 0 | 4 | 0 | 0 | 0 |
| 16 | MF | (Qatar) QAT | Boualem Khoukhi | 28 | 3 | 21 | 2 | 3 | 1 | 4 | 0 | 0 | 0 |
| 15 | MF | (Qatar) QAT | Tarek Salman | 18 | 0 | 15 | 0 | 3 | 0 | 0 | 0 | 0 | 0 |
| 65 | MF | (Qatar) QAT | Bahaa Ellethy | 1 | 0 | 1 | 0 | 0 | 0 | 0 | 0 | 0 | 0 |
| 70 | MF | (Qatar) QAT | Hamza Sanhaji | 3 | 0 | 0 | 0 | 0 | 0 | 3 | 0 | 0 | 0 |
| 87 | MF | (Qatar) QAT | Saud Al-Nasr | 1 | 0 | 1 | 0 | 0 | 0 | 0 | 0 | 0 | 0 |
| 10 | MF | (Qatar) QAT | Hassan Al-Haidos | 27 | 10 | 20 | 10 | 3 | 0 | 4 | 0 | 0 | 0 |
| 11 | FW | (Algeria) ALG | Baghdad Bounedjah | 29 | 46 | 22 | 39 | 3 | 3 | 4 | 4 | 0 | 0 |
| 17 | FW | (Qatar) QAT | Hassan Palang | 4 | 2 | 4 | 2 | 0 | 0 | 0 | 0 | 0 | 0 |
| 78 | MF | (Qatar) QAT | Akram Afif | 29 | 30 | 22 | 26 | 3 | 2 | 4 | 2 | 0 | 0 |
Players transferred out during the season

Last updated: 13 April 2019
Source: fr.soccerway.com

=== Goalscorers ===
Includes all competitive matches. The list is sorted alphabetically by surname when total goals are equal.

| No. | Nat. | Player | Pos. | QSL | QEC | CL 1 | TOTAL |
|---|---|---|---|---|---|---|---|
| 11 | (Algeria) | Baghdad Bounedjah | FW | 39 | 3 | 5 | 47 |
| 78 | (Qatar) | Akram Afif | FW | 26 | 2 | 2 | 30 |
| 10 | (Qatar) | Hassan Al-Haidos | FW | 10 | 0 | 0 | 10 |
| 6 | (Spain) | Xavi | MF | 2 | 0 | 3 | 5 |
| 3 | (Qatar) | Abdelkarim Hassan | FW | 4 | 0 | 0 | 4 |
| 5 | (South Korea) | Jung Woo-young | MF | 3 | 0 | 0 | 3 |
| 12 | (Qatar) | Hamid Ismail | DF | 3 | 0 | 0 | 3 |
| 16 | (Qatar) | Boualem Khoukhi | MF | 2 | 1 | 0 | 3 |
| 17 | (Qatar) | Hassan Palang | FW | 2 | 0 | 0 | 2 |
| 4 | (Qatar) | Ahmed Sayyar | MF | 2 | 0 | 0 | 2 |
| 8 | (Qatar) | Ali Assadalla | MF | 1 | 1 | 0 | 2 |
| 2 | (Qatar) | Pedro Miguel | DF | 1 | 0 | 0 | 1 |
| 20 | (Qatar) | Salem Al-Hajri | DF | 1 | 0 | 0 | 1 |
| Own Goals | | | | 4 | 0 | 0 | 4 |
| Totals | | | | 100 | 7 | 11 | 118 |

== Players ==
Note: Flags indicate national team as defined under FIFA eligibility rules; some limited exceptions apply. Players may hold more than one non-FIFA nationality.

| No. | Pos. | Nation | Player |
|---|---|---|---|
| 1 | GK | QAT | Saad Al Sheeb |
| 77 | DF | JOR | Hussain Hameed Aamir |
| 3 | DF | QAT | Yasser Abubakar |
| 4 | MF | QAT | Ahmed Sayyar |
| — | DF | KOR | Jung Woo-young (5) |
| 6 | MF | ESP | Xavi (captain) |
| 7 | DF | QAT | Musab Kheder |
| 8 | MF | QAT | Ali Assadalla |
| 9 | FW | QAT | Meshaal Al-Shammeri |
| 10 | MF | QAT | Hassan Al-Haidos |
| 11 | FW | ALG | Baghdad Bounedjah |
| 12 | DF | QAT | Hamid Ismail |
| 13 | DF | QAT | Ibrahim Majid |
| 14 | MF | ESP | Gabi |
| 15 | DF | QAT | Fahad Al-Abdulrahman |
| 16 | MF | QAT | Boualem Khoukhi |
| 17 | FW | QAT | Hassan Palang |

| No. | Pos. | Nation | Player} |
|---|---|---|---|
| 18 | FW | QAT | Abdulaziz Al-Jalabi |
| 19 | MF | QAT | Hussain Bahzad |
| 20 | DF | QAT | Salem Al-Hajri |
| 21 | GK | QAT | Saud Al Hajiri |
| 22 | GK | QAT | Meshaal Barsham |
| 23 | MF | QAT | Ayoub Mashhor |
| 25 | FW | QAT | Jassim Al-Shammeri |
| 27 | MF | QAT | Meshal Ibrahim |
| 30 | GK | QAT | Jehad Hudib |
| 34 | DF | QAT | Hatim Kamal |
| 37 | DF | QAT | Ahmed Suhail |
| 73 | MF | QAT | Mohammed Waad |
| 74 | MF | QAT | Ghassan Waheed |
| 87 | MF | QAT | Saud Al-Nasr |
| 88 | MF | LBA | Aladeen Younes |
| 92 | GK | OMA | Sami Al-Hassawi |
| 99 | FW | QAT | Ali Ferydoon (on loan from Al-Shamal) |

Players with Multiple Nationalities

- (Qatar) (Kuwait) Ibrahim Majid
- (Qatar) (Portugal) Pedro Miguel
- (Qatar) (Sudan) Yasser Abubakar
- (Qatar) (Bahrain) Ali Asad
- (Qatar) (Bahrain) Ahmed Sayyar
- (Qatar) (Iran) Hussain Bahzad
- (Qatar) (Iran) Ali Ferydoon
- (Qatar) (Algeria) Boualem Khoukhi

== Transfers ==
=== In ===
| Date | Pos | Player | From club | Transfer fee | Source |
|---|---|---|---|---|---|
| 28 June 2018 | DF | (South Korea) Jung Woo-young | (Japan) Vissel Kobe | €800,000 | |
| 2 July 2018 | MF | (Spain) Gabi | (Spain) Atlético Madrid | Free | |

=== Out ===
| Date | Pos | Player | To club | Transfer fee | Source |
|---|---|---|---|---|---|
| 16 August 2018 | MF | (Algeria) Jugurtha Hamroun | Al-Kharaitiyat | Loan one year | |
| 16 August 2018 | DF | (Iran) Morteza Pouraliganji | (Belgium) Eupen | Undisclosed | |

=== New Contracts ===
| No | P | Name | Age | Contract length | Contract ends | Source |
|---|---|---|---|---|---|---|
| 11 | FW | (Algeria) Baghdad Bounedjah | 27 | 3 season | 2024 | |
