= 2019–20 Al Sadd SC season =

Al Sadd SC
2019–20 season
- Chairman: Muhammed bin Khalifa Al Thani
- Head coach: Xavi (from 28 May 2019)
- Stadium: Jassim Bin Hamad Stadium
- Qatar Stars League: 3rd
- Emir of Qatar Cup: Quarter-finals
- Sheikh Jassim Cup: Winners
- Crown Prince Cup: Winners
- Champions League: 2019: Semi-finals; 2020: Group stage
- Club World Cup: Second round
- Top goalscorer: League: Akram Afif (15); All: Baghdad Bounedjah (23); Akram Afif (23)
- Highest home attendance: 13,753 vs Al-Hilal (1 October 2019)
- Lowest home attendance: 5,843 vs Sepahan (18 February 2020)
Home colours	Away colours

In the 2019–20 season, Al Sadd SC is competing in the Qatar Stars League for the 47th season, as well as the Emir of Qatar Cup and the Champions League.

== Squad list ==
Players and squad numbers last updated on 20 September 2019.
Note: Flags indicate national team as has been defined under FIFA eligibility rules. Players may hold more than one non-FIFA nationality.

No.	Nat.	Position	Name	Date of birth (age)	Signed from
Goalkeepers
1	(Qatar)	GK	Saad Al Sheeb	19 February 1990 (aged 29)	(Qatar) Al Sailiya
22	(Qatar)	GK	Meshaal Barsham	14 February 1998 (aged 21)	(Qatar) Youth system
Defenders
2	(Qatar)	CB	Pedro Miguel	6 August 1990 (aged 29)	(Qatar) Al Ahli
3	(Qatar)	LB	Abdelkarim Hassan	28 August 1993 (aged 26)	(Qatar) Youth system
12	(Qatar)	RB	Hamid Ismail	12 September 1987 (aged 32)	(Qatar) Al-Arabi
66	(Qatar)	CB	Yasser Abubakar	10 January 1992 (aged 27)	(Qatar) El Jaish
15	(Qatar)	CB	Tarek Salman	5 December 1997 (aged 21)	(Spain) Júpiter Leonés
16	(Qatar)	LB / CB	Boualem Khoukhi	7 September 1990 (aged 29)	(Qatar) Al Arabi
Midfielders
4	(Qatar)	DM	Ahmed Sayyar	6 October 1993 (aged 25)	(Qatar) Al-Gharafa
5	(South Korea)	DM	Jung Woo-young	14 December 1989 (aged 29)	(Japan) Vissel Kobe
8	(Qatar)	CM	Ali Assadalla	19 January 1993 (aged 26)	(Bahrain) Al Muharraq
14	(Spain)	DM	Gabi	10 July 1983 (aged 36)	(Spain) Atlético Madrid
19	(South Korea)	AM	Nam Tae-hee	3 July 1991 (aged 28)	(Qatar) Al-Duhail
23	(Qatar)	RW	Hashim Ali	17 August 2000 (aged 19)	(Qatar) Youth system
20	(Qatar)	DM	Salem Al-Hajri	10 April 1996 (aged 23)	(Belgium) Eupen
	(Mexico)	AM	Marco Fabián	21 July 1989 (aged 30)	(United States) Philadelphia Union
Forwards
9	(Qatar)	ST	Abdulaziz Al Ansari	19 February 1992 (aged 27)	(Qatar) Al Kharaitiyat
10	(Qatar)	RW	Hassan Al-Haidos	11 December 1990 (aged 28)	(Qatar) Youth system
11	(Algeria)	ST	Baghdad Bounedjah	24 November 1991 (aged 27)	(Tunisia) Étoile du Sahel
17	(Qatar)	RW	Hassan Ahmad	2 April 1998 (aged 21)	(Austria) LASK Linz II
78	(Qatar)	LW	Akram Afif	18 November 1996 (aged 22)	(Qatar) Al Markhiya

== Pre-season and friendlies ==
21 July 2019 Pre-season	Palamós (Spain)	1–1	Al Sadd	Palamós, Spain
19:00 UTC+2	David Cano 75'	Report	Tae-hee 85'	Stadium: Palamós-Costa Brava; Attendance: 1,300

24 July 2019 Pre-season	Olot (Spain)	2–1	Al Sadd	Olot, Spain
19:00 UTC+2	Tarek 48' (o.g.); Arimany 55'	Report	Hashim 31'	Stadium: Municipal d'Olot; Attendance: 1,432; Referee: Carlos Rodríguez Enrique

28 July 2019 Pre-season	Sabadell (Spain)	1–4	Al Sadd	Olot, Spain
19:00 UTC+2		Report	Al-Haidos (?); Ali Assadalla (?)	Stadium: Municipal d'Olot

== Competitions ==
=== Overview ===
Competition	Record								Started round	Final position / round	First match	Last match
Competition	G	W	D	L	GF	GA	GD	Win %	Started round	Final position / round	First match	Last match
Qatar Stars League	22	14	3	5	51	29	+22	63.64	Matchday 1	3rd	21 August 2019	20 August 2020 (Note: The league was halted on 16 March 2020 due to COVID-19 pandemic in Qatar, then later resumed on 24 July 2020.)
Emir of Qatar Cup	1	1	0	0	3	1	+2	100.00	Round of 16	To be confirmed	6 February 2020	In Progress
Qatar Crown Prince Cup	2	2	0	0	8	1	+7	100.00	Semi-finals	Winner	11 January 2020	17 January 2020
Sheikh Jassim Cup	1	1	0	0	1	0	+1	100.00	Final	Winner	17 August 2019	
Champions League	12	6	2	4	17	18	−1	50.00	Round of 16	Semi-final	6 August 2019	22 October 2019
Champions League	2	1	1	0	5	3	+2	50.00	Group stage	To be confirmed	11 February 2020	In Progress
FIFA Club World Cup	3	1	0	2	7	10	−3	33.33	First round	Second round	11 December 2019	17 December 2019
Total	33	21	2	10	78	53	+25	63.64				

Updated to match played 6 February 2020
Source: Competitions

=== Qatar Stars League ===
==== League table ====
Pos	Team	Pld	W	D	L	GF	GA	GD	Pts	Qualification or relegation
1	Al Duhail (C)	22	16	4	2	38	16	+22	52	Qualification for AFC Champions League group stage and FIFA Club World Cup first round
2	Al-Rayyan	22	15	6	1	40	15	+25	51	Qualification for AFC Champions League group stage
3	Al Sadd (Note: Al Sadd qualified for the AFC Champions League group stage as Emir of Qatar Cup winners.)	22	14	3	5	51	29	+22	45	Qualification for AFC Champions League group stage
4	Al-Gharafa	22	10	6	6	34	29	+5	36	Qualification for AFC Champions League play-off round
5	Al-Sailiya	22	8	5	9	22	25	−3	29	

Source: QSL
Rules for classification: 1) Points; 2) Goal difference; 3) Number of goals scored;
(C) Champions

==== Results summary ====
Overall								Home						Away					
Pld	W	D	L	GF	GA	GD	Pts	W	D	L	GF	GA	GD	W	D	L	GF	GA	GD
22	14	3	5	51	29	+22	45	7	2	2	22	15	+7	7	1	3	29	14	+15

Last updated: 27 November 2019.
Source: Competitive matches

==== Results by round ====
Round	1	2	3	4	5	6	7	8	9	10	11	12	13	14	15	16	17	18	19	20	21	22
Ground	H	A	A	H	A	H	A	H	A	H	A	A	H	A	H	H	A	H	A	H	A	H
Result	W	W	W	W	W	W	L	W	L	L	W	L	W	D	W	D	L	W	W	W	W	D
Position	1	1	1	1	1	1	1	1	2	3	3	3	3	3	3	3	3	3	3	3	3	3

Updated to match(es) played on 13 April 2019. Source: Competitive matches
A = Away; H = Home; W = Win; D = Draw; L = Loss

==== Matches ====
21 August 2019 Round 1	Al-Sadd	4–1	Al-Wakrah	Doha
17:20	Al Ansari 9'; Hassan 74'; Sayyar 84', 90'	Soccerway report	Benyettou 26'	Stadium: Jassim bin Hamad Stadium; Referee: Naif Al-Qadri

31 August 2019 Round 2	Al-Shahania	1–7	Al-Sadd	Doha
19:20	Ferydoon 75'	Soccerway report	Bounedjah 8', 17', 28', 71'; Khoukhi 23'; Hassan 34'; Al-Haidos 45'	Stadium: Jassim bin Hamad Stadium; Referee: Khamis Al Marri

20 September 2019 Round 3	Al-Sadd	2–1	Umm Salal	Al Wakrah
16:50	Afif 19'; Bounedjah 34' (pen.)	Soccerway report	Sagbo 9'	Stadium: Al Janoub Stadium; Referee: Saad Al Shammari

24 September 2019 Round 4	Al-Sailiya	1–3	Al-Sadd	Al Wakrah
18:55	Ansafrifad 84'	Soccerway report	Bounedjah 8' (pen.); Afif 80' (pen.); Assadalla 83'	Stadium: Al Janoub Stadium; Referee: Khamis Al Marri

5 October 2019 Round 6	Al-Sadd	2–4	Al-Rayyan	Doha
18:40	Tae-Hee 28'; Bounedjah 54'	Soccerway report	Mercado 25'; Tabata 44'; Abdallah 59'; Brahimi 70'	Stadium: Jassim bin Hamad Stadium; Referee: Saoud Al Athbah

26 October 2019 Round 8	Al-Sadd	2–1	Al-Ahli	Doha
17:20	Bounedjah 23', 32' (pen.)	Soccerway report	Hernández 48'	Stadium: Hamad bin Khalifa Stadium; Referee: Abdulrahman Al-Jassim

2 November 2019 Round 9	Al-Duhail	4–1	Al-Sadd	Doha
19:25	Muntari 34'; Boudiaf 45+1'; Edmilson 81'; Almoez Ali 90+1'	Soccerway report	Al-Haidos 14'	Stadium: Abdullah bin Khalifa Stadium; Attendance: 4,878; Referee: Salman Ahmad Flahi

9 November 2019 Round 10	Al-Sadd	0–3	Qatar SC	Doha
17:10		Soccerway report	Rashidov 9', 90+4'; Kayke 31'	Stadium: Thani bin Jassim Stadium; Referee: Mohammed Al Shummari

28 December 2019 Round 11	Al-Gharafa	1–5	Al-Sadd	Al Rayyan
19:20	Hanni 74'	Soccerway report	Bounedjah 2'; Afif 13' (pen.), 52', 72'; Al-Haidos 32' (pen.)	Stadium: Thani bin Jassim Stadium; Referee: Abdulhadi Al Rowaily

2 January 2020 Round 12	Al-Wakrah	2–1	Al-Sadd	Al Wakrah
16:10	Benyettou 8'; Omar Ali 38'	Soccerway report	Al-Haidos 86'	Stadium: Saoud bin Abdulrahman Stadium; Referee: Saoud Al Athbah

6 January 2020 Round 5	Al-Arabi	1–6	Al-Sadd	Doha
18:45	Muniesa 10'	Soccerway report	Pedro Miguel 30'; Bounedjah 32', 81'; Al-Haidos 35', 55'; Afif 74'	Stadium: Grand Hamad Stadium; Referee: Mohammed Al Shummari

21 January 2020 Round 7	Al-Khor	1–2	Al-Sadd	Al Khor
19:00	Tiago Bezerra 4'	Soccerway report	Nam Tae-hee 30'; Afif 90+6'	Stadium: Al-Khor SC Stadium; Referee: Saad Al Shammari

25 January 2020 Round 13	Al-Sadd	4–2	Al-Shahania	Doha
18:40	Al-Haidos 9'; Al-Yahri 49' (o.g.); Afif 57' (pen.); Bounedjah 90+4' (pen.)	Soccerway report	Akaïchi 3', 65'	Stadium: Jassim bin Hamad Stadium; Referee: Naif Al-Qadri

1 February 2020 Round 15	Al-Sadd	3–0	Al-Sailiya	Doha
16:35	Afif 3', 48' (pen.), 54'	Soccerway report		Stadium: Jassim bin Hamad Stadium; Referee: Salman Ahmad Flahi

22 February 2020 Round 14	Umm Salal	2–2	Al-Sadd	Al Gharrafa
16:45	Azzi 24'; Al-Mawas 33'	Soccerway report	Fabián 49'; Nam Tae-hee 59'	Stadium: Thani bin Jassim Stadium; Referee: Khamis Mohamed Al Kuwari

27 February 2020 Round 16	Al-Sadd	1–1	Al-Arabi	Doha
19:30	Afif 29'	Soccerway report	Lasogga 88' (pen.)	Stadium: Jassim bin Hamad Stadium; Referee: Abdulrahman Al Marri

7 March 2020 Round 17	Al-Rayyan	1–0	Al-Sadd	Doha
19:05	Kom 9'	Soccerway report		Stadium: Jassim bin Hamad Stadium; Referee: Abdulrahman Al-Jassim

25 July 2020 Round 18	Al-Sadd	2–1	Al-Khor	Doha
19:00	Afif 25', 45+2'	Soccerway report	Tiago Bezerra 27'	Stadium: Jassim bin Hamad Stadium; Attendance: 0 (close doors); Referee: Hamad Al Subaie
Note: due to coronavirus pandemic, Qatar Football Association decided to be all matches played behind closed doors.

3 August 2020 Round 19	Al-Ahli	0–1	Al-Sadd	Al Wakrah
16:30		Soccerway report	Al-Haidos 43'	Stadium: Al Janoub Stadium; Attendance: 0 (close doors); Referee: Meshari Al shammari
Note: due to coronavirus pandemic, Qatar Football Association decided to be all matches played behind closed doors.

8 August 2020 Round 20	Al-Sadd	1–0	Al-Duhail	Doha
18:45	Tabata 24'	Soccerway report		Stadium: Jassim bin Hamad Stadium; Attendance: 0 (close doors); Referee: Abdulrahman Al Jassim
Note: due to coronavirus pandemic, Qatar Football Association decided to be all matches played behind closed doors.

13 August 2020 Round 21	Qatar SC	0–1	Al-Sadd	Doha
19:30		Soccerway report	Bounedjah 90+8'	Stadium: Jassim bin Hamad Stadium; Referee: Salman Ahmad Flahi

20 August 2020 Round 22	Al-Sadd	1–1	Al-Gharafa	Al Wakrah
14:00	Akram Afif 90+1' (pen.)	Soccerway report	Ahmed Alaaeldin 65'	Stadium: Al Janoub Stadium; Referee: Saoud Al Athbah

== Emir of Qatar Cup ==
6 February 2020 Round of 16	Al Sadd	3–1	Al-Kharaitiyat	Doha
16:30	Hassan 1'; Bounedjah 25', 82'	Report	Tiberkanine 20'	Stadium: Abdullah bin Khalifa Stadium; Referee: Saoud Al Athbah
Note: Lineup for Al Sadd - Barsham, Hassan, Woo-young, Salman, Assadalla, Al-Ansari (Tae-hee 60’), Bounedjah, Ismail, Al-Hajri (Gabi ?’), Hashim Ali, Abubakar (Afif 60’).

13 March 2020 Quarter-finals	Al-Wakrah	2–2 (1–4 p)	Al Sadd SC	Doha
18:30	Muneer 66'; Mahmoud 83'		Fabián 43'; Hashim Ali 56'	Stadium: Abdullah bin Khalifa Stadium; Attendance: 0 (close doors); Referee: Mohammed Al Shummari
	Penalties
	Lucas Mendes (penalty missed); Ali Malolah (penalty missed); Ismail Mahmoud (penalty scored)		(penalty scored) Akram Afif; (penalty scored) Nam Tae-hee; (penalty scored) Boualem Khoukhi; (penalty scored) Marco Fabián
Note: Lineup for Al Sadd - . due to coronavirus outbreak, Qatar Football Association decided to be all matches played behind closed doors.

== Qatar Cup (ex) Crown Prince Cup ==
11 January 2020 Semi-finals	Al Sadd	4–1	Al-Rayyan	Doha
19:30	Khoukhi 38'; Afif 42', 68'; Al-Hajri 54'	Report	Mouafak Awad 15'	Stadium: Jassim bin Hamad Stadium; Referee: Salman Ahmad Flahi
Note: Lineup for Al Sadd - Al Sheeb, Pedro Miguel, Hassan, Khoukhi, Woo-young, Al-Hajri (Al Ansari 90’), Gabi, Tae-hee, Bounedjah, Afif (Abubakar 90’), Al-Haidos (Assadalla 80’)

17 January 2020 Final	Al Sadd	4–0	Al-Duhail	Doha
17:30	Nam Tae-hee 5'; Bounedjah 21', 45'; Afif 72' (pen.)	Report		Stadium: Jassim bin Hamad Stadium; Attendance: 11,447; Referee: Saoud Al Athbah
Note: Lineup for Al Sadd - Al Sheeb, Pedro Miguel, Hassan, Khoukhi, Woo-young, Al-Hajri, Gabi, Tae-hee (Assadalla 80’), Bounedjah, Afif (Abubakar 87’), Al-Haidos (Al Ansari 85’)

== Sheikh Jassim Cup ==
17 August 2019	Al Sadd	1–0	Al-Duhail	Doha
19:15	Assadalla 14'	Report		Stadium: Jassim bin Hamad Stadium; Referee: Saoud Al Athbah

== FIFA Club World Cup ==
11 December 2019 First round	Al Sadd (Qatar)	3–1 (a.e.t.)	(New Caledonia) Hienghène Sport	Doha
20:30	Bounedjah 26'; Hassan 100'; Pedro Miguel 114'	Report	Roine 46'	Stadium: Jassim bin Hamad Stadium; Attendance: 7,047; Referee: Mustapha Ghorbal (Algeria)

14 December 2019 Second round	Monterrey (Mexico)	3–2	(Qatar) Al Sadd	Doha
20:30	Vangioni 23'; Funes Mori 45+1'; Rodríguez 77'	Report	Bounedjah 66'; Hassan 89'	Stadium: Jassim bin Hamad Stadium; Attendance: 4,878; Referee: Ovidiu Hațegan (Romania)

17 December 2019 Fifth place	Al Sadd (Qatar)	2–6	(Tunisia) Espérance de Tunis	Doha
17:30	Bounedjah 32' (pen.); Al-Haydos 49' (pen.)	Report	Elhouni 6', 42', 74'; Badri 13', 25' (pen.); Derbali 87'	Stadium: Khalifa International Stadium; Attendance: 15,037; Referee: Abdelkader Zitouni (Tahiti)

== 2019 AFC Champions League ==
=== Knockout stage ===
==== Round of 16 ====
6 August 2019	Al-Duhail (Qatar)	1–1	(Qatar) Al Sadd	Al Wakrah
19:00 UTC+3	Msakni 44'	Live Report; Stats Report	Afif 30'	Stadium: Al Janoub Stadium; Attendance: 9,548; Referee: Ryuji Sato (Japan)

13 August 2019	Al Sadd (Qatar)	3–1	(Qatar) Al-Duhail	Doha
19:15 UTC+3	Afif 20'; Hassan 34'; Yasser 90+1' (o.g.)	Live Report; Stats Report	Edmilson 56'	Stadium: Jassim bin Hamad Stadium; Attendance: 9,930; Referee: Chris Beath (Australia)

==== Quarter-finals ====
26 August 2019	Al-Nassr (Saudi Arabia)	2–1	(Qatar) Al Sadd	Riyadh
20:45 UTC+3	Al-Dossari 44'; Giuliano 72'	Live Report; Stats Report	Asad 21'	Stadium: King Fahd International Stadium; Attendance: 16,911; Referee: Valentin Kovalenko (Uzbekistan)

16 September 2019	Al Sadd (Qatar)	3–1	(Saudi Arabia) Al-Nassr	Doha
18:45 UTC+3	Afif 26'; Al-Haydos 59'; Bounedjah 83' (pen.)	Live Report; Stats Report	Hamdallah 33'	Stadium: Jassim bin Hamad Stadium; Attendance: 13,262; Referee: Hettikamkanamge Perera (Sri Lanka)

==== Semi-finals ====
1 October 2019	Al Sadd (Qatar)	1–4	(Saudi Arabia) Al-Hilal	Doha
18:30 UTC+3	Gomis 14' (o.g.)	Live Report; Stats Report	Gomis 33', 60'; Al-Bulaihi 45'; Al-Shalhoub 67'	Stadium: Jassim bin Hamad Stadium; Attendance: 13,753; Referee: Ahmed Al-Kaf (Oman)

22 October 2019	Al-Hilal (Saudi Arabia)	2–4	(Qatar) Al Sadd	Riyadh
19:15 UTC+3	S. Al-Dawsari 13'; Gomis 25'	Live Report; Stats Report	Afif 17' (pen.); Nam Tae-hee 19'; Al-Haydos 20'; Khoukhi 90+3'	Stadium: King Saud University Stadium; Attendance: 20,743; Referee: Muhammad Taqi (Singapore)

== 2020 AFC Champions League ==
=== Group stage ===
==== Group D ====
Pos	Team	Pld	W	D	L	GF	GA	GD	Pts	Qualification	NAS	SAD	SEP	AIN
1	(Saudi Arabia) Al-Nassr	6	3	2	1	9	5	+4	11	Advance to knockout stage	—	2–2	2–0	0–1
2	(Qatar) Al-Sadd	6	2	3	1	14	8	+6	9	Advance to knockout stage	1–1	—	3–0	4–0
3	(Iran) Sepahan	6	2	1	3	6	8	−2	7		0–2	2–1	—	0–0
4	(United Arab Emirates) Al-Ain	6	1	2	3	5	13	−8	5		1–2	3–3	0–4	—

Source: AFC

11 February 2020 1	Al-Nassr (Saudi Arabia)	2–2	(Qatar) Al Sadd	Riyadh
18:15 UTC+3	Hamdallah 7'; Al-Obaid 53'	Live Report; Stats Report	Bounedjah 9'; Al-Haydos 48'	Stadium: Prince Faisal bin Fahd Stadium; Attendance: 11,828; Referee: Chris Beath (Australia)

18 February 2020 2	Al Sadd (Qatar)	3–0	(Iran) Sepahan	Doha
18:35 UTC+3	Afif 51'; Al-Haydos 72', 78'	Live Report; Stats Report		Stadium: Jassim bin Hamad Stadium; Attendance: 5,843; Referee: Aziz Asimov (Uzbekistan)

== Squad information ==
=== Playing statistics ===
No.	Pos	Nat	Player	Total		Qatar Stars League		Emir of Qatar Cup		2019 CL1		2020 CL1		Other (Note: Includes the Qatar Cup, Sheikh Jassim Cup and FIFA Club World Cup)	
No.	Pos	Nat	Player	Apps	Goals	Apps	Goals	Apps	Goals	Apps	Goals	Apps	Goals	Apps	Goals
1	GK	(Qatar) QAT	Saad Al Sheeb	33	0	20	0	0	0	6	0	2	0	5	0
22	GK	(Qatar) QAT	Meshaal Barsham	5	0	2	0	1	0	0	0	0	0	2	0
2	DF	(Qatar) QAT	Pedro Miguel	32	2	19	1	0	0	5	0	2	0	6	1
3	DF	(Qatar) QAT	Abdelkarim Hassan	28	6	16	2	1	1	5	1	0	0	6	2
12	DF	(Qatar) QAT	Hamid Ismail	16	0	9	0	1	0	3	0	2	0	1	0
20	DF	(Qatar) QAT	Salem Al-Hajri	23	1	11	0	1	0	5	0	0	0	6	1
66	DF	(Qatar) QAT	Yasser Abubakar	12	0	7	0	1	0	0	0	2	0	2	0
96	DF	(Qatar) QAT	Hossam Kamal	1	0	1	0	0	0	0	0	0	0	0	0
4	MF	(Qatar) QAT	Ahmed Sayyar	7	2	7	2	0	0	0	0	0	0	0	0
5	MF	(South Korea) KOR	Jung Woo-young	36	0	21	0	1	0	6	0	2	0	6	0
8	MF	(Qatar) QAT	Ali Assadalla	23	3	13	1	1	0	4	1	0	0	5	1
14	MF	(Spain) ESP	Gabi	28	0	13	0	1	0	6	0	2	0	6	0
16	MF	(Qatar) QAT	Boualem Khoukhi	33	3	20	1	0	0	5	1	2	0	6	1
6	MF	(Qatar) QAT	Tarek Salman	28	0	16	0	1	0	6	0	2	0	3	0
19	MF	(South Korea) KOR	Nam Tae-hee	32	5	19	3	1	0	5	1	2	0	5	1
23	MF	(Qatar) QAT	Hashim Ali	25	0	13	0	1	0	6	0	2	0	3	0
33	MF	(Mexico) MEX	Marco Fabián	2	1	2	1	0	0	0	0	0	0	0	0
61	MF	(Qatar) QAT	Mostafa Tarek	2	0	2	0	0	0	0	0	0	0	0	0
7	MF	(Qatar) QAT	Mohammed Waad	4	0	3	0	0	0	0	0	1	0	0	0
9	FW	(Qatar) QAT	Abdulaziz Al Ansari	15	1	8	1	1	0	2	0	0	0	4	0
10	MF	(Qatar) QAT	Hassan Al-Haidos	32	14	18	8	0	0	6	2	2	3	6	1
11	FW	(Algeria) ALG	Baghdad Bounedjah	34	23	21	14	1	2	5	1	2	1	5	5
12	FW	(Qatar) QAT	Rodrigo Tabata	4	1	4	1	0	0	0	0	0	0	0	0
17	FW	(Qatar) QAT	Hassan Palang	0	0	0	0	0	0	0	0	0	0	0	0
78	MF	(Qatar) QAT	Akram Afif	34	23	19	15	1	0	6	4	2	1	6	3
Players transferred out during the season

Last updated: 6 March 2020
Source: fr.soccerway.com

=== Goalscorers ===
Includes all competitive matches. The list is sorted alphabetically by surname when total goals are equal.

No.	Nat.	Player	Pos.	QSL	QEC	CPC	CL 1	SJC	CWC	TOTAL
11	(Algeria)	Baghdad Bounedjah	FW	14	2	2	2	0	3	23
78	(Qatar)	Akram Afif	FW	15	0	3	5	0	0	23
10	(Qatar)	Hassan Al-Haidos	MF	8	0	0	5	0	1	14
3	(Qatar)	Abdelkarim Hassan	DF	2	1	0	1	0	2	6
19	(South Korea)	Nam Tae-hee	MF	3	0	1	1	0	0	5
16	(Qatar)	Boualem Khoukhi	MF	1	0	1	1	0	0	3
8	(Qatar)	Ali Assadalla	MF	1	0	0	0	1	0	2
4	(Qatar)	Ahmed Sayyar	MF	2	0	0	0	0	0	2
2	(Qatar)	Pedro Miguel	DF	1	0	0	0	0	1	2
33	(Mexico)	Marco Fabián	FW	1	0	0	0	0	0	1
12	(Qatar)	Rodrigo Tabata	FW	1	0	0	0	0	0	1
20	(Qatar)	Salem Al-Hajri	DF	0	0	1	0	0	0	1
9	(Qatar)	Abdulaziz Al Ansari	MF	1	0	0	0	0	0	1
Own Goals				1	0	0	2	0	0	3
Totals				51	3	8	17	1	7	87

== Transfers ==
=== In ===
Date	Pos	Player	From club	Transfer fee	Source
8 February 2019	MF	(South Korea) Nam Tae-hee	Al-Duhail	Free transfer	
11 July 2019	FW	(Qatar) Abdulaziz Al Ansari	Al-Kharaitiyat	Loan for one year	
31 January 2020	MF	(Mexico) Marco Fabián	(United States) Philadelphia Union	Free transfer	

=== Out ===
Date	Pos	Player	To club	Transfer fee	Source
30 June 2019	MF	(Algeria) Jugurtha Hamroun	(Turkey) BB Erzurumspor	Free transfer	
