= 2017 Sheikh Jassim Cup =

Lekhwiya	Al Sadd
2	4
- Date: 9 September 2017
- Venue: Abdullah bin Khalifa Stadium, Doha

The 2017 Sheikh Jassim Cup was the 39th edition of the cup competition for football teams from Qatar. It changed from a group staged pre-season tournament featuring all Qatari Stars League sides, to a one-off match between the previous seasons Qatar Stars League winners and Emir of Qatar Cup winners.

== Match details ==
9 September 2017
17:00

Al-Duhail	2 – 4	Al Sadd
Tae-hee 41'; Almoez 90+6'		Bounedjah 5', 20', 66'; Hamroun 80' (pen.)

Abdullah bin Khalifa Stadium, Doha
Referee: Abdulrahman Al Jassim

Al-Duhail SC	Al Sadd

Formation: 4–4–2
GK	16	(Qatar) Khalifa Ababacar
DF	2	(Qatar) Mohammed Musa
DF	3	(Qatar) Khalid Muftah		(substituted off) ?'
DF	4	(Brazil) Lucas Mendes
DF	6	(Qatar) Abdurahman Abubakar
DF	15	(Qatar) Bassam Al Rawi		(substituted off) ?'
MF	7	(Qatar) Ismaeel Mohammad		(substituted off) ?'
MF	10	(South Korea) Nam Tae-hee
MF	12	(Qatar) Karim Boudiaf
FW	9	(Morocco) Youssef El-Arabi
FW	28	(Tunisia) Youssef Msakni
Substitutes
FW	19	(Qatar) Almoez Ali		(substituted on) ?'
MF	20	(Qatar) Ali Afif		(substituted on) ?'
MF	8	(Qatar) Luiz Martin	(yellow card) 71'	(substituted on) ?'
Manager
(Algeria) Djamel Belmadi

Formation: 4–4–2
GK	1	(Qatar) Saad Al Sheeb
DF	7	(Qatar) Musab Kheder
MF	74	(Qatar) Ghassan Waheed
DF	20	(Qatar) Salem Al-Hajri
MF	16	(Qatar) Boualem Khoukhi
MF	4	(Qatar) Ahmed Sayyar		(substituted off) ?'
MF	10	(Qatar) Hassan Al-Haydos
DF	15	(Qatar) Fahad Al-Abdulrahman		(substituted off) ?'
MF	6	(Spain) Xavi (c)
MF	5	(Algeria) Jugurtha Hamroun
FW	11	(Algeria) Baghdad Bounedjah	(yellow card) 45'	(substituted off) ?'
Substitutes
DF	34	(Qatar) Hatem Kamal	(yellow card) 89'	(substituted on) ?'
MF	87	(Qatar) Saoud Ibrahim Al-Nassr		(substituted on) ?'
FW	9	(Qatar) Meshaal Al-Shammeri		(substituted on) ?'
Manager
(Portugal) Jesualdo Ferreira

Man of the Match:
Baghdad Bounedjah (Al-Sadd)

Assistant referees:
?
Saud Ahmed
Fourth official:
Majed Haders
Additional assistant referees:
Khamis al-Kuwari
?

Match rules

- 90 minutes.
- 30 minutes of extra time if necessary.
- Penalty shoot-out if scores still level.
- Seven named substitutes, of which up to three may be used.
