= 2020 Amir of Qatar Cup =

Amir Cup 2020 (Qatar)
Tournament details
- Country: Qatar
- Dates: 5 February – 18 December
- Teams: 16

Final positions
- Champions: Al Sadd (17th title)
- Runners-up: Al Arabi

Tournament statistics
- Matches played: 8
- Goals scored: 23 (2.88 per match)

The 2020 Amir of Qatar Cup (named Amir Cup since 2019) was the 48th edition of the Qatari cup tournament in men's football. It was played by the first and second level divisions of the Qatari football league structure. Due to the COVID-19 pandemic in Qatar, it was initially postponed. Al Sadd defeated Al Arabi 2–1 in the final to win the cup and a place in the 2021 AFC Champions League.

Note: all matches in Qatar time (GMT+3).

== Round of 16 ==
5 February 2020	Al-Sailiya	2–1	Umm-Salal	Doha
16:30	Boussoufa 44' (pen.); Yousef 51'	Report	Nasser Al-Nassr 81'	Stadium: Hamad bin Khalifa Stadium

5 February 2020	Al-Rayyan	4–0	Al-Mesaimeer	Doha
19:00	Boli 11', 82'; Muftah 37'; Tabata 90+2'	Report		Stadium: Hamad bin Khalifa Stadium

6 February 2020	Al-Sadd	3–1	Al-Kharaitiyat	Doha
16:30	Hassan 1'; Bounedjah 25', 82'	Report	Tiberkanine 20'	Stadium: Abdullah bin Khalifa Stadium; Referee: Saoud Al Athbah

6 February 2020	Al-Duhail	4–0	Muaither	Doha
19:00	Kwang-song 42', 44'; Almoez Ali 45'; Muntari 69'	Report		Stadium: Abdullah bin Khalifa Stadium

7 February 2020	Al-Shahania	0–0 (9–10 p)	Al-Wakrah	Doha
16:30		Report		Stadium: Grand Hamad Stadium; Referee: Salman Ahmad Flahi
	Penalties
	de Jong (penalty scored); Al-Yahri (penalty scored); Farhan (penalty scored); Jalal (penalty scored); Akaïchi (penalty scored); Hussain (penalty scored); Al-Yazidi (penalty scored); Shanbih (penalty scored); Elfadil (penalty scored); Álvaro Mejía (penalty missed)		(penalty scored) Mendes; (penalty scored) Suhail; (penalty scored) Benyettou; (penalty scored) Mardanli; (penalty scored) Omar Ali; (penalty scored) Sánchez; (penalty scored) Muneer; (penalty scored) Coulibaly; (penalty scored) Al Khater; (penalty scored) Malolah

7 February 2020	Al-Ahli	2–1	Qatar SC	Doha
19:00	Benson 34'; Diamé 88'	Report	Rashidov 64'	Stadium: Grand Hamad Stadium

8 February 2020	Al-Arabi	2–2 (4–3 p)	Al-Khor	Al Rayyan
16:30	Lasogga 74' (pen.); Harbaoui 75'	Report	Bezerra 14' (pen.); Mubarak 45+1'	Stadium: Thani bin Jassim Stadium
	Penalties
	Fatehi (penalty scored); Harbaoui (penalty scored); Lasogga (penalty missed); Al-Neel (penalty scored); Gunnarsson (penalty scored)		(penalty missed) Lucca Borges; (penalty scored) Brahmi; (penalty missed) Bezerra; (penalty scored) Amada; (penalty scored) Al-Mohanadi

8 February 2020	Al-Gharafa	0–1	Al-Markhiya	Al Rayyan
19:00		Report	Aden 63'	Stadium: Thani bin Jassim Stadium; Referee: Abdulrahman Al Marri

== Quarter-finals ==
11 March 2020	Al-Arabi	3–0	Al-Ahli	Doha
18:30	Lasogga 6', 22'; Al-Malki 70'	Report		Stadium: Abdullah bin Khalifa Stadium; Referee: Khamis Al Marri

12 March 2020	Al-Markhiya	1–0	Al-Rayyan	Doha
18:30	Ahmed Kanu 82' (pen.)	Report		Stadium: Jassim bin Hamad Stadium; Attendance: 0 (close doors); Referee: Mashari Al Shummari
Note: due to coronavirus outbreak, Qatar Football Association decided to be all matches played behind closed doors.

13 March 2020	Al-Wakrah	2–2 (1–4 p)	Al-Sadd	Doha
18:30	Muneer 66'; Mahmoud 83'		Fabián 43'; Hashim Ali 56'	Stadium: Abdullah bin Khalifa Stadium; Attendance: 0 (close doors); Referee: Mohammed Al Shummari
	Penalties
	Lucas Mendes (penalty missed); Ali Malolah (penalty missed); Ismail Mahmoud (penalty scored)		(penalty scored) Akram Afif; (penalty scored) Nam Tae-hee; (penalty scored) Boualem Khoukhi; (penalty scored) Marco Fabián
Note: due to coronavirus outbreak, Qatar Football Association decided to be all matches played behind closed doors.

14 March 2020	Al-Duhail	4–0	Al-Sailiya	Doha
18:30	Edmilson 24' (pen.); Al-Ahrak 49'; Almoez Ali 52'; Moustafa 65'	Report		Stadium: Jassim bin Hamad Stadium; Attendance: 0 (close doors)
Note: due to coronavirus outbreak, Qatar Football Association decided to be all matches played behind closed doors.

== Semi-finals ==
30 October 2020	Al-Markhiya	0–2	Al-Arabi	Doha
20:30				Stadium: Abdullah bin Khalifa Stadium

31 October 2020	Al-Duhail	1–4	Al-Sadd	Doha
20:30				Stadium: Abdullah bin Khalifa Stadium

== Final ==
18 December 2020
19:00

Al-Arabi	1–2	Al-Sadd
Gunnarsson 23'	Report	Bounedjah 3', 44'

Ahmed bin Ali Stadium, Al Rayyan
Attendance: 20,000
Referee: Saoud Ali Al Adba

GK	21	(Qatar) Mahmud Abunada
DF	5	(Spain) Marc Muniesa
MF	6	(Qatar) Abdullah Marafee
MF	7	(Iran) Mehrdad Mohammadi
MF	8	(Qatar) Ahmed Fatehi
FW	13	(Qatar) Sebastián Soria
DF	15	(Qatar) Jassem Gaber	(substituted off) 73'
MF	17	(Iceland) Aron Gunnarsson
DF	23	(Qatar) Fahad Shonain	(yellow card) 90+2'
DF	24	(Algeria) Ayoub Azzi	(yellow card) 69'
MF	99	(Iran) Mehdi Torabi	(substituted off) 66'
Substitutes :
FW	20	(Qatar) Abdulaziz Al Ansari	(substituted on) 73'
MF	11	(Qatar) Mohammed Salah Al-Neel	(substituted on) 66'
Manager :
(Iceland) Heimir Hallgrímsson

GK	22	(Qatar) Meshaal Barsham
DF	3	(Qatar) Abdelkarim Hassan	(yellow card) 33'	(substituted off) 72'
DF	16	(Qatar) Boualem Khoukhi	(yellow card) 50'
DF	2	(Qatar) Pedro Miguel
DF	7	(Qatar) Mohammed Waad	(substituted off) 46'
MF	5	(South Korea) Jung Woo-young
MF	13	(Brazil) Guilherme Torres
MF	18	(Spain) Santi Cazorla
FW	10	(Qatar) Hassan Al-Haidos	(substituted off) 72'
FW	45	(Qatar) Akram Afif	(yellow card) 90'	(substituted off) 90+1'
FW	11	(Algeria) Baghdad Bounedjah	(substituted off) 90+4'
Substitutes :
FW	17	(Qatar) Rodrigo Tabata	(substituted on) 72'
MF	8	(Qatar) Ali Assadalla	(substituted on) 90+4'
MF	19	(South Korea) Nam Tae-hee	(substituted on) 46'
DF	70	(Qatar) Musab Kheder	(substituted on) 72'
MF	37	(Qatar) Ahmed Suhail	(substituted on) 90+1'
Manager :
(Spain) Xavi

Man of the Match:

Assistant referees:
Majid Al-Shammari
Zahy Al Shmari
Fourth official:
Abdulhadi Al Rowaily
Assistant video assistant referees:

Match rules

- 90 minutes.
- 30 minutes of extra time if necessary.
- Penalty shoot-out if scores still level.
- Seven named substitutes, of which up to three may be used.

== Top goalscorers ==
Rank	Player	Club	Goals
1	(Algeria) Baghdad Bounedjah	Al-Sadd	5
2	(Germany) Pierre-Michel Lasogga	Al-Arabi	3
3	(Ivory Coast) Yohan Boli	Al-Rayyan	2
3	(North Korea) Han Kwang-song	Al-Duhail	2
