= Gabi (footballer, born 1983) =

Spanish footballer

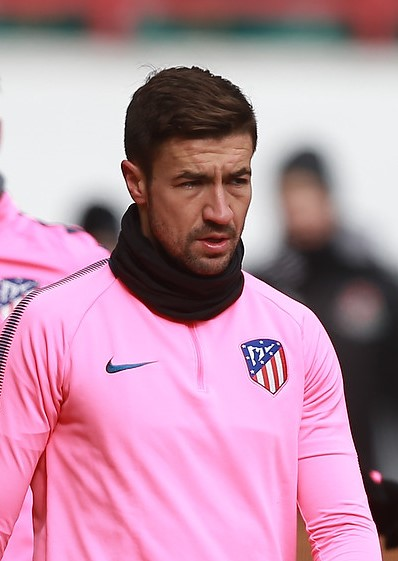
- Gabi with Atlético Madrid in 2018

Personal information
- Full name: Gabriel Luis Fernández Arenas
- Date of birth: 10 July 1983 (age 43)
- Place of birth: Madrid, Spain
- Height: 1.80 m (5 ft 11 in)
- Position: Defensive midfielder

Team information
- Current team: Atlético Madrid (assistant)

Youth career
- San Eladio
- Atlético Madrid

Senior career*
Years	Team	Apps	(Gls)
2002–2004	Atlético Madrid B	46	(4)
2004–2007	Atlético Madrid	58	(1)
2004–2005	→ Getafe (loan)	32	(2)
2007–2011	Zaragoza	135	(16)
2011–2018	Atlético Madrid	239	(6)
2018–2020	Al Sadd	35	(0)
Total		545	(29)

International career
2003	Spain U20	7	(1)
2004–2005	Spain U21	12	(0)

Managerial career
- 2023: Getafe (youth)
- 2023–2025: Getafe B
- 2025: Zaragoza
- 2026–: Atlético Madrid (assistant)
- * Club domestic league appearances and goals

Gabriel Luis Fernández Arenas (Spanish pronunciation: [ɡaˈβɾjel feɾˈnandeθ aˈɾenas]; born 10 July 1983), known as Gabi ([ˈɡaβi]), is a Spanish former professional footballer who played as a defensive midfielder. He is currently assistant manager of La Liga club Atlético Madrid.

He made 429 La Liga appearances, mostly in two spells at Atlético Madrid interspersed with a period at Zaragoza, winning domestic and European silverware with the former; during his ten-year stint at the club, he amassed competitive totals of 417 matches and ten goals. He also played in Qatar with Al Sadd.

Gabi represented Spain at youth level.

== Club career ==
=== Atlético Madrid ===
Gabi was born in Madrid. A product of Atlético Madrid's youth system, he was seldom used during his debut season with the Colchoneros' first team.

After a loan to another club in the capital, Getafe CF, Gabi would make 52 La Liga appearances for the club from 2005 to 2007, scoring his only goal in a 1–1 away draw against RCD Espanyol on 9 April 2006.

=== Zaragoza ===
In early February 2007, Gabi joined Real Zaragoza on a €9 million transfer, agreeing to a four-year contract effective as of July. He was an undisputed starter in his first year, but the Aragonese were relegated from the top flight.

Defensive-minded Gabi netted four times in 35 games in the 2008–09 campaign, as his team immediately regained their lost status. In the following season he again was first choice, helping to a final 14th position.

Again a starter in the 2010–11, only missing matches due to suspension, Gabi scored a career-best ten goals as Zaragoza again escaped relegation, six from penalties – he was also their captain. On 12 March 2011, he scored twice from the spot in a 4–0 home win against Valencia CF. On 30 April, he converted a penalty in a 3–2 victory away to Real Madrid and, on the last matchday, scored twice from open play in a 2–1 win at Levante UD that secured his team's top-flight status.

=== Atlético return ===
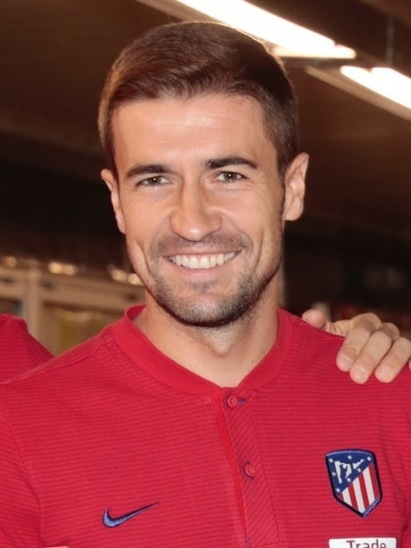
Gabi in 2017

On 1 July 2011, Gabi returned to Atlético Madrid on a transfer fee of around €3 million. He scored his first goal for the team on 4 December, in a 3–1 home win over Rayo Vallecano – adding one in his own net– and started most of the first season in his second spell, partnering fellow youth graduate Mario Suárez in defensive midfield.

Gabi played 45 official matches in the 2012–13 campaign, including seven in the side's victorious run in the Copa del Rey, the first in 17 years. He was also selected by manager Diego Simeone as the new captain.

On 17 May 2014, in the away match to FC Barcelona that was the last of the season, Gabi took a 49th-minute corner kick which was headed in by Diego Godín to equalise 1–1, and give Atlético its first league title since 1996. On 4 July, he signed a new contract that kept him at the club until 2017.

In the second leg of a domestic cup quarter-final against Barcelona on 28 January 2015, Gabi was sent off in the tunnel at the end of the first half; his midfield partner Suárez was also dismissed later on, in an eventual 2–3 home defeat. On 7 October 2016, the 33-year-old inked a new contract until June 2018, commenting on the deal: "I always say that playing with Atlético de Madrid was my childhood dream, so I cannot ask for more than what I am living these years."

Gabi scored his first goal of the season – from 49 appearances – on 16 May 2018, netting from close range after an assist from Koke in the last minute of the Europa League final against Olympique de Marseille, a 3–0 win in Lyon.

=== Al Sadd ===
Gabi moved abroad for the first time on 2 July 2018, signing a two-year contract at Qatar Stars League club Al Sadd SC. He partnered veteran compatriot Xavi in midfield, and won the league in their first season together.

On 15 June 2020, Gabi left the Jassim bin Hamad Stadium. On 29 November, he announced his retirement aged 37.

== International career ==
Gabi was selected in José Ufarte's Spain squad at the 2003 FIFA U-20 World Cup in the United Arab Emirates, finishing as runners-up to Brazil. He scored the first goal of their opening game, a 2–1 loss to Argentina in Sharjah.

== Coaching career ==
In July 2023, Gabi was named manager of Getafe's Juvenil B squad. On 13 November, he took over the B team in the Segunda Federación after the dismissal of Emilio Ferreras.

Gabi returned to Zaragoza on 17 March 2025, being appointed first-team head coach in place of Miguel Ángel Ramírez. He managed to avoid second-tier relegation at 51 points, but was sacked on 12 October after a poor start to the new season saw them placed bottom of the table.

Gabi reunited with Simeone on 20 June 2026, being named in Atlético Madrid's staff as replacement to Nelson Vivas who left after eight years.

== Style of play ==
Known for his tackling ability as well as his combativeness and hard work, Gabi could both break down opposition attack and dictate play with the ball with equal effectiveness. He was also known to be proficient when in possession, capable of delivering through balls and distributing the ball at both long and short lengths.

== Career statistics ==
Appearances and goals by club, season and competition
Club	Season	League			National cup (Note: Includes Copa del Rey, Emir of Qatar Cup)		League cup (Note: Includes QSL Cup)		Continental		Other		Total	
Club	Season	Division	Apps	Goals	Apps	Goals	Apps	Goals	Apps	Goals	Apps	Goals	Apps	Goals
Atlético Madrid	2003–04	La Liga	6	0	1	0	—		—		—		7	0
Atlético Madrid	2004–05	La Liga	0	0	0	0	—		3 (Note: Appearances in UEFA Intertoto Cup)	0	—		3	0
Atlético Madrid	2005–06	La Liga	32	1	1	0	—		—		—		33	1
Atlético Madrid	2006–07	La Liga	20	0	2	0	—		—		—		22	0
Atlético Madrid	Total		58	1	4	0	—		3	0	—		65	1
Getafe (loan)	2004–05	La Liga	32	2	2	0	—		—		—		34	2
Zaragoza	2007–08	La Liga	32	0	3	0	—		2 (Note: Appearances in UEFA Europa League)	0	—		37	0
Zaragoza	2008–09	Segunda División	35	4	0	0	—		—		—		35	4
Zaragoza	2009–10	La Liga	32	1	2	0	—		—		—		34	1
Zaragoza	2010–11	La Liga	36	10	2	1	—		—		—		38	11
Zaragoza	Total		135	16	7	1	—		2	0	—		144	16
Atlético Madrid	2011–12	La Liga	31	2	1	0	—		17	1	—		49	3
Atlético Madrid	2012–13	La Liga	35	0	8	0	—		2	0	1 (Note: Appearance in UEFA Super Cup)	0	46	0
Atlético Madrid	2013–14	La Liga	36	3	7	0	—		12 (Note: Appearances in UEFA Champions League)	0	2 (Note: Appearances in Supercopa de España)	0	57	3
Atlético Madrid	2014–15	La Liga	34	0	5	1	—		7	0	2	0	48	1
Atlético Madrid	2015–16	La Liga	35	1	4	0	—		13	0	—		51	1
Atlético Madrid	2016–17	La Liga	34	0	5	0	—		11	0	—		50	0
Atlético Madrid	2017–18	La Liga	34	0	3	0	—		13 (Note: Five appearances in UEFA Champions League, eight appearances and one goal in UEFA Europa League)	1	—		50	1
Atlético Madrid	Total		239	6	33	1	—		75	2	5	0	352	9
Al Sadd	2018–19	Qatar Stars League	21	0	3	0	3	0	9 (Note: Appearances in AFC Champions League)	0	—		36	0
Al Sadd	2019–20	Qatar Stars League	14	0	2	0	1	0	8	0	6 (Note: One appearance in Sheikh Jassim Cup, three appearances in FIFA Club World Cup, two appearances in Qatar Cup)	0	31	0
Al Sadd	Total		35	0	5	0	4	0	17	0	6	0	67	0
Career total			499	24	51	2	4	0	97	2	11	0	662	28

== Managerial statistics ==
As of match played 11 October 2025

Managerial record by team and tenure
Team	Nat	From	To	Record								Ref
Team	Nat	From	To	G	W	D	L	GF	GA	GD	Win %	Ref
Getafe B	(Spain)	13 November 2023	17 March 2025	52	26	16	10	73	45	+28	50.00	
Zaragoza	(Spain)	17 March 2025	12 October 2025	20	5	6	9	20	31	−11	25.00	
Total				72	31	22	19	93	76	+17	43.06	—

== Honours ==
Atlético Madrid

- La Liga: 2013–14
- Copa del Rey: 2012–13
- Supercopa de España: 2014
- UEFA Europa League: 2011–12, 2017–18
- UEFA Super Cup: 2012
- UEFA Champions League runner-up: 2013–14, 2015–16

Al Sadd

- Qatar Stars League: 2018–19
- Sheikh Jassim Cup: 2019
- Qatar Cup: 2020

Spain U20

- FIFA U-20 World Cup runner-up: 2003

Individual

- La Liga Squad of the Season: 2013–14
- UEFA Champions League Squad of the Season: 2013–14, 2015–16
- UEFA Europa League Squad of the Season: 2017–18

== See also ==
- List of Atlético Madrid players (+100)
- List of La Liga players (400+ appearances)
- List of Real Zaragoza players (+100 appearances)
