= 2020 Qatar Cup =

Tournament details
- Country: Qatar
- Dates: January 10–January 17
- Teams: 4

Final positions
- Champions: Al Sadd (7th title)
- Runners-up: Al-Duhail

Tournament statistics
- Matches played: 3
- Goals scored: 10 (3.33 per match)
- Top goal scorer(s): (Algeria) Baghdad Bounedjah (Qatar) Akram Afif (2 goals)

The 2020 Qatar Cup, more widely known as the Crown Prince Cup, was the twenty-fifth edition of the Qatar Cup, and the first edition since 2018, as the competition did not take place in 2019. It was played from January 10–17. The cup is contested by the top four finishers of the 2018–19 Qatar Stars League.

== Participants ==
Team	2018–19 League Position
Al Sadd	Champions
Al-Duhail	Runners-up
Al-Sailiya	Third
Al-Rayyan	Fourth

== Matches ==
=== Semi-finals ===
10 January 2020
21:30 AST

Al-Duhail	2–0	Al-Sailiya
Mandžukić 59'; Ali 72' (pen.)	Report

Jassim Bin Hamad Stadium, Doha
Referee: Nayef Mohamed Al Kadiri
11 January 2020
21:30 AST

Al Sadd	4–1	Al-Rayyan
Khoukhi 38'; Afif 42'; Al Hajri 54'; Mercado 68' (o.g.)	Report	Awad 15'

Jassim Bin Hamad Stadium, Doha
Referee: Salman Ahmad Falahi

== Finals ==
17 January 2020
19:30 AST

Al-Duhail	0–4	Al Sadd
	Report	Tae-hee 5'; Bounedjah 21', 45+3'; Afif 71' (pen.)

Jassim Bin Hamad Stadium, Doha
Attendance: 11,447
Referee: Saoud Ali Al Adba

== Bracket ==
Semi-finals
2020–01–10 - Doha
Al-Duhail	2
Al-Sailiya	0
2020–01–11 - Doha
Al Sadd	4
Al-Rayyan	1

Final
2020–01–17 - Doha
Al-Duhail	0
Al Sadd	4

== Top scorers ==
As of 17 January 2020

Rank	Player	Club	Goals
1	(Qatar) Akram Afif	Al Sadd	2
1	(Algeria) Baghdad Bounedjah	Al Sadd	2
3	(Qatar) Mouafak Awad	Al-Rayyan	1
3	(Qatar) Boualem Khoukhi	Al Sadd	1
3	(Qatar) Salem Al-Hajri	Al Sadd	1
3	(South Korea) Nam Tae-hee	Al Sadd	1
3	(Croatia) Mario Mandžukić	Al-Duhail	1
3	(Qatar) Almoez Ali	Al-Duhail	1
