= Salem Khalifah =

Qatari footballer (born 1990)

Personal information
- Full name: Salem Khalifah Helal
- Date of birth: 26 October 1990 (age 36)
- Place of birth: Qatar
- Position: Forward

Youth career
- Al-Shamal

Senior career*
Years	Team	Apps	(Gls)
2010–2015	Muaither		
2015–2017	Umm Salal	20	(0)
2016	→ Muaither (loan)		
2017–2019	Al-Khor	21	(1)
2019–2020	Al-Ahli	3	(0)
2020–2021	Al-Markhiya		
2021–2022	Mesaimeer		
2022–2023	Al-Khor		
2024–2025	Al-Salliya		
- * Club domestic league appearances and goals

Salem Khalifah (Arabic: سالم خليفة) (born 26 October 1990) is a Qatari footballer. He currently plays as a forward.
