= Hamad Mansour =

Qatari footballer (born 1994)

Personal information
- Full name: Hamad Mansour Ahmed Rajah
- Date of birth: 13 August 1994 (age 32)
- Place of birth: Qatar
- Position: Midfielder

Team information
- Current team: Al Ahli
- Number: 20

Youth career
- Al-Sadd

Senior career*
Years	Team	Apps	(Gls)
2014–2019	Al-Sadd	3	(0)
2016–2017	→ Muaither (loan)	19	(1)
2017–2019	→ Al-Khor (loan)	36	(1)
2019–2021	Qatar	18	(0)
2021–2022	Al-Kharaitiyat	21	(0)
2022–2024	Al-Wakrah	17	(0)
2023–2024	→ Al-Shamal (loan)	19	(0)
2024–	Al Ahli	22	(0)
- * Club domestic league appearances and goals as of 17 January 2026

Hamad Mansour (Arabic:حمد منصور) (born 13 August 1994) is a Qatari footballer who plays for Al Ahli as a midfielder.
