= Reza Shanbih =

Qatari footballer (born 1984)

Personal information
- Full name: Reza Shanbih Qanber Najafi
- Date of birth: 4 May 1984 (age 42)
- Place of birth: Qatar
- Height: 1.71 m (5 ft 7 1/2 in)
- Positions: Left back; midfielder

Senior career*
Years	Team	Apps	(Gls)
2004–2018	Al-Khor		
2018–2024	Al Shahaniya		
- * Club domestic league appearances and goals

Reza Shanbih (Arabic:رضا شنبيه) (born 4 May 1984) is a Qatari footballer as a left back or midfielder.
