= Saud Al-Nasr =

Qatari association football player (born 1998)

Saud Al-Nasr سعود النصر
Personal information
- Full name: Saud Ibrahim Senkis Al-Nasr
- Date of birth: 1 February 1998 (age 28)
- Place of birth: Qatar
- Height: 1.68 m (5 ft 6 in)
- Position: Midfielder

Youth career
- –2017: Al-Sadd

Senior career*
Years	Team	Apps	(Gls)
2017–2021	Al-Sadd	4	(0)
2021–2023	Al-Wakrah	24	(0)
2023–2024	Umm Salal	4	(0)
2024–2025	Mesaimeer	1	(0)
- * Club domestic league appearances and goals

Saud Ibrahim Al-Nasr (Arabic:سعود إبراهيم النصر) (born 1 February 1998) is a Qatari footballer who plays as a midfielder.

== Career ==
Al-Nasr started his career at Al-Sadd and is a product of the Al-Sadd's youth system. On 16 September 2017, Al-Nasr made his professional debut for Al-Sadd against Al-Markhiya in the Pro League, replacing Ahmed Sayyar .

=== Club ===
Al-Sadd

- Qatar Cup: 2021
