= Aladeen Younes =

American-born Libyan footballer (born 1996)

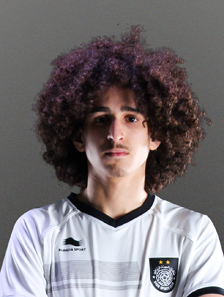

Personal information
- Full name: Aladeen Salman Younes
- Date of birth: 22 January 1996 (age 30)
- Place of birth: Tempe, Arizona, United States
- Height: 1.82 m (5 ft 11 1/2 in)
- Position: Midfielder

Youth career
- 2008–2015: Al-Sadd

Senior career*
| Years | Team | Apps | (Gls) |
| 2015–2019 | Al-Sadd | 6 | (1) |
| 2016–2017 | → Tampa Bay Rowdies II (loan) | 2 | (0) |
| 2023–2024 | Muaither | 0 | (1) |

International career
| 2014 | Libya U20 | 4 | (0) |
- * Club domestic league appearances and goals

Aladeen Younes (Arabic: علاء الدين يونس; born 22 January 1996), commonly known as Alaadeen Salman, is an American-born Libyan football player who plays . His father, Salman Younes, is a former footballer who played for Michigan State University (spartans) in the United States.

== Club career ==
=== Al Sadd ===
==== Early career ====
Aladeen started out with Al-Sadd club in 2008 in the youth academy. He came into Al Sadd's first team at the age of 17, His first appearance was in April 2015 scoring against Al-Shamal. He was called in 2014 to the Libyan national team U20 for the African nation cup. He played 4 games against Chad, Ivory Coast and Tunisia (Home and away game). They did not qualify for the African nations.

== Personal life ==
Aladeen has a brother, Moatez Younes who is a footballer who played with Atlético Malagueño in Spain from 2013 to 2015. Then he left to play with Tampa Bay rowdies in Florida. His father previously played for Michigan State University in the US. His father graduated from MSU and then did his master's degree in University of Michigan, Ann Arbor and did his Phd in Arizona State University. His mother comes from Libya. Younes has 2 sisters. He graduated in May 2014 from his school Qatar International School, and now attending an online college.
