= Salem Al-Hajri =

Qatari footballer (born 1996)

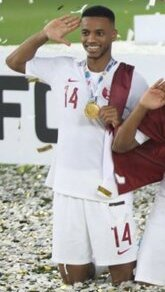
- Al-Hajri with Qatar in 2019

Personal information
- Full name: Salem Ali Salem Al-Hajri
- Date of birth: 10 April 1996 (age 30)
- Place of birth: Doha, Qatar
- Height: 1.83 m (6 ft 0 in)
- Positions: Defender; midfielder

Team information
- Current team: Umm Salal (on loan from Al-Wakrah)
- Number: 8

Youth career
- ASPIRE
- –2015: Al-Sadd
- 2015: Eupen

Senior career*
Years	Team	Apps	(Gls)
2016–2025	Al-Sadd	86	(1)
2023	→ Al-Wakrah (loan)	1	(0)
2024	→ Al-Shamal (loan)	1	(0)
2025–	Al-Wakrah	3	(0)
2026–	→ Umm Salal (loan)	1	(0)

International career^{‡}
2014	Qatar U19	3	(0)
2015	Qatar U20	3	(0)
2018–	Qatar U23	6	(0)
2017–2023	Qatar	25	(0)
Medal record
Representing Qatar
Men's Football
AFC Asian Cup
Winner	2019 UAE	Team
- * Club domestic league appearances and goals as of 3 April 2026 (UTC) ‡ National team caps and goals as of 13:04, 10 April 2026 (UTC)

Salem Ali Salem Al-Hajri (Arabic: سَالِم عَلِيّ سَالِم الْهَاجِرِيّ; born 10 April 1996) is a Qatari footballer who currently plays for Umm Salal, on loan from Al-Wakrah and the Qatar national football team. He was named in the nation's 2019 Copa America squad.

== Club career ==
Al-Hajri began his professional career with Al Sadd SC in 2016. In February 2023 he joined Al-Wakrah SC.

== Honours ==
Al-Sadd

- Qatar Stars League: 2018-19, 2020-21, 2021-22
- Qatar Cup: 2017, 2020, 2021
- Emir of Qatar Cup: 2017, 2020, 2021
- Sheikh Jassim Cup: 2017, 2019
- Qatari Stars Cup: 2019-20

Qatar

- AFC Asian Cup: 2019
