= Musab Kheder =

Qatari footballer (born 1993)

Personal information
- Full name: Musab Kheder Kamal Djebril
- Date of birth: 26 September 1993 (age 33)
- Place of birth: Khartoum, Sudan
- Height: 1.76 m (5 ft 9 in)
- Position: Right-back

Team information
- Current team: Al-Shamal
- Number: 70

Senior career*
Years	Team	Apps	(Gls)
2012–2025	Al-Sadd	122	(4)
2017	→ Al-Rayyan (loan)	7	(0)
2018–2020	→ Al-Arabi (loan)	23	(0)
2025–	Al-Shamal	3	(0)

International career^{‡}
2015-2016	Qatar U23	10	(0)
2016–2022	Qatar	30	(0)
Medal record
Representing Qatar
Men's football
FIFA Arab Cup
Third place	2021
- * Club domestic league appearances and goals as of 19 April 2023 (UTC) ‡ National team caps and goals as of 10 November 2022 (UTC)

Musab Kheder Kamal Djebril (Arabic: مُصْعَب خَضِر كَمَال جِبْرِيل; born 26 September 1993) is a professional footballer who plays for Al-Shamal. Born in Sudan, he plays for the Qatar national team.

== Club career ==
Born in Sudan, Kheder began his professional career with Al Sadd SC in 2012. In January 2017 he was loaned to Al-Rayyan SC and from 2018 to 2020 to Al-Arabi SC.

== Honours ==
=== Club ===
Al-Sadd

- Qatar Stars League: 2012-13, 2020-21, 2021-22
- Emir of Qatar Cup: 2014, 2015, 2020, 2021
- Qatar Cup: 2021
- Sheikh Jassim Cup: 2014, 2017
- Qatari Stars Cup: 2019-20
