= Mouafak Awad =

Qatari footballer (born 1997)

Moufak Awad
Personal information
- Full name: Moufak Ahmed Awad Qaidoum
- Date of birth: 11 May 1997 (age 29)
- Position: Right back

Team information
- Current team: Al-Shamal
- Number: 2

Youth career
- -2013: Al-Sailiya
- 2015-2016: LASK
- 2016-2017: Cultural Leonesa

Senior career*
Years	Team	Apps	(Gls)
2014–2015	Al-Sailiya	1	(0)
2017–2023	Al-Rayyan	71	(3)
2018	→ Al-Khor (loan)	2	(0)
2023–	Al-Shamal	15	(0)

International career
2015-2016	Qatar U19	6	(0)
2016-2018	Qatar U23	3	(0)
- * Club domestic league appearances and goals as of 11:26, 4 June 2019 (UTC)

Moufak Awad (Arabic: موفق عوض; born 11 May 1997) is a Qatari professional footballer who plays as a right back for Qatar Stars League side Al-Rayyan and previously Qatar National U23 team. Moufak represented Qatar in the 2016 AFC U-19 Championship. In June 2019, he took part in the Maurice Revello Tournament in Qatar

== Career statistics ==
=== Club ===
As of 4 June 2019.

Club	Season	League			Cup		Continental		Other		Total	
Club	Season	Division	Apps	Goals	Apps	Goals	Apps	Goals	Apps	Goals	Apps	Goals
Al-Sailiya	2014–15	Qatar Stars League	1	0	0	0	0	0	0	0	1	0
Al-Rayyan	2017–18	Qatar Stars League	2	0	1 (Note: Appearances in the Qatar Cup)	0	0	0	0	0	3	0
Al-Khor	2017–18	Qatar Stars League	2	0	0	0	0	0	0	0	2	0
Al-Rayyan	2018–19	Qatar Stars League	15	0	2	0	2 (Note: Appearances in the AFC Champions League)	0	0	0	19	0
Career total			18	1	7	0	4	0	0	0	29	1
