= Naif Mubarak =

Qatari footballer (born 1990)

Personal information
- Full name: Naif Mubarak Al-Buraiki
- Date of birth: 6 August 1990 (age 36)
- Position: Right-back

Team information
- Current team: Al-Khor
- Number: 15

Senior career*
Years	Team	Apps	(Gls)
2011–2014	El Jaish		
2012–2014	→ Al Sailiya (loan)	30	(0)
2014–	Al-Khor	143	(4)
- * Club domestic league appearances and goals

Naif Mubarak (Arabic:نايف مبارك) (born 6 August 1990) is a Qatari footballer who currently plays for Al-Khor.
