= Ahmed Sayyar =

Bahraini footballer (born 1993)

Personal information
- Full name: Ahmed Badr Sayyar
- Date of birth: 6 October 1993 (age 33)
- Place of birth: Bahrain
- Height: 1.77 m (5 ft 9 1/2 in)
- Position: Midfielder

Team information
- Current team: Qatar SC
- Number: 21

Youth career
- Al-Gharafa

Senior career*
| Years | Team | Apps | (Gls) |
| 2013–2017 | Al-Gharafa | 5 | (0) |
| 2017–2025 | Al-Sadd | 63 | (7) |
| 2025– | Qatar SC | 0 | (0) |
- * Club domestic league appearances and goals

Ahmed Sayyar (Arabic: أحمد سيار; born 6 September 1993) is a Bahraini footballer who plays for Qatar SC.

== Club career ==
Sayyar began his professional career with Al-Gharafa SC in 2013. In January 2017 he joined Al Sadd SC.

== Club ==
Al-Sadd

- Qatar Stars League: 2018-19, 2020-21, 2021-22
- Emir of Qatar Cup: 2017, 2020, 2021
- Qatar Cup: 2017, 2020, 2021
- Sheikh Jassim Cup: 2017, 2019
- Qatari Stars Cup: 2019-20
