= Sami Al-Hassawi =

Omani footballer (born 1992)

Personal information
- Full name: Sami Subait Al-Hassawi
- Date of birth: 31 July 1992 (age 34)
- Place of birth: Muscat, Oman
- Height: 1.80 m (5 ft 11 in)
- Position: Goalkeeper

Youth career
- 2004–2011: Qatar SC

Senior career*
Years	Team	Apps	(Gls)
2011–2017	Qatar SC	13	(0)
2018	Al Sadd	0	(0)
2018–2020	Umm Salal	0	(0)
- * Club domestic league appearances and goals

Sami Subait Al-Hassawi (Arabic: سامي سبيت الحساوي; born 31 July 1992), commonly known as Sami Subait, is an Omani footballer who plays as a goalkeeper.

== Personal ==
His father, Subait bin Awad, was a footballer who represented the Oman national team in the seventies. He moved to Qatar in 2003 and he currently works as a coach in Aspire Academy.

== Honours ==
=== Club ===
- With Qatar

- QNB Cup (1): 2014
