= Saud Al Hajiri =

Qatari footballer (born 1986)

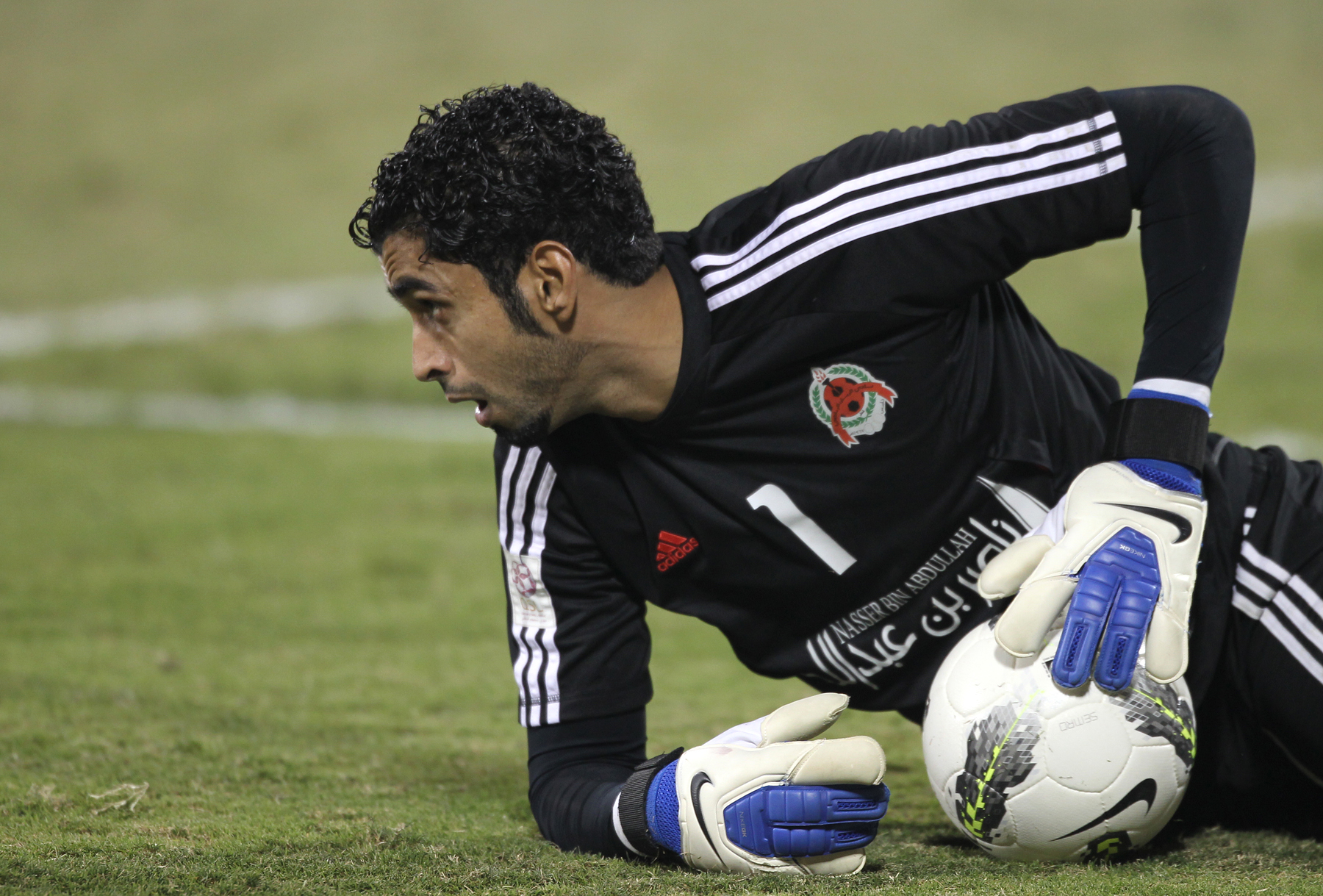

Personal information
- Date of birth: July 19, 1986 (age 40)
- Place of birth: Doha, Qatar
- Height: 1.88 m (6 ft 2 in)
- Position: Goalkeeper

Youth career
- 1990–2005: Al Rayyan

Senior career*
Years	Team	Apps	(Gls)
2005–2017	A-Rayyan	51	(0)
2017–2019	Al Sadd	0	(0)
2019	→ Al-Shahania (loan)	4	(0)
2019–2024	A-Rayyan	6	(0)

International career
2011–	Qatar	1	(0)
- * Club domestic league appearances and goals

Saud Abdulla Al Hajri (born July 19, 1986, in Doha) is a Qatari former football player.
