= Yasser Abubakar =

Qatari footballer (born 1992)

Personal information
- Full name: Yasser Abubakar Yaqoub Eisa
- Date of birth: 10 January 1992 (age 34)
- Height: 1.80 m (5 ft 11 in)
- Positions: Left-back; winger

Youth career
- Al-Sailiya

Senior career*
Years	Team	Apps	(Gls)
2011–2014	Al-Sailiya	43	(2)
2014–2017	El Jaish	70	(5)
2017–2020	Al-Sadd	42	(0)
2020–2021	Al-Arabi	15	(0)
2021–2022	Al Ahli	0	(0)
- * Club domestic league appearances and goals

Yasser Abubakar (Arabic:ياسر أبو بكر) (born 10 January 1992) is a Qatari footballer. He currently plays as a left back.
