= Ali Ferydoon =

Kuwaiti footballer (born 1992)

Personal information
- Full name: Ali Ferydoon Shahosseini
- Date of birth: 1 January 1992 (age 34)
- Place of birth: Kuwait City, Kuwait
- Height: 1.86 m (6 ft 1 in)
- Position: Forward

Youth career
- 2007–2011: Al Salmiya
- 2011–2013: Al Shamal

Senior career*
Years	Team	Apps	(Gls)
2011–2021	Al Shamal	42	(28)
2016–2017	→ Al-Ahli (loan)	12	(6)
2017–2018	→ Al Sadd (loan)	6	(0)
2018–2019	→ Al-Ahli (loan)	21	(3)
2019–2020	→ Al-Shahania (loan)	15	(1)
2020–2021	→ Al-Rayyan (loan)	12	(1)
2021	Umm Salal	8	(1)
2021–2022	Al-Ahli	3	(0)
2022	Al-Arabi	6	(2)
2023	Sanat Naft Abadan	6	(0)
2024	Mesaimeer	0	(0)
- * Club domestic league appearances and goals as of 5 December 2018

Ali Ferydoon (Persian: على فريدون شاه‌حسینی; born 1 January 1992) is a Kuwaiti footballer who is a forward plays as a forward. He scored 19 goals for Al Shamal in the 2013–14 season and was Qatari 2nd Division's top scorer.
