= Ghassan Waheed =

Qatari footballer (born 1997)

Ghassan Waheed غسان وحيد
Personal information
- Full name: Ghassan Waheed Gharbia
- Date of birth: 7 March 1997 (age 29)
- Height: 1.72 m (5 ft 8 in)
- Position: Midfielder

Team information
- Current team: Al-Kharaitiyat
- Number: 4

Youth career
- Al-Sadd

Senior career*
Years	Team	Apps	(Gls)
2017–2018	Al-Sadd	1	(0)
2018–2019	Al-Sailiya	3	(0)
2019–2020	Al-Markhiya		
2020–2023	Muaither		
2023–	Al-Kharaitiyat	9	(0)
- * Club domestic league appearances and goals

Ghassan Waheed (Arabic:غسان وحيد) (born 7 March 1997) is a Qatari footballer. He currently plays for Al-Kharaitiyat as a midfielder.

== Career ==
=== Al-Sadd ===
Ghassan Waheed started his career at Al-Sadd and is a product of the Al-Sadd's youth system. On 31 January 2018, Ghassan Waheed made his professional debut for Al-Sadd against Al-Markhiya in the Pro League .

=== Al-Sailiya ===
On 1 July 2018 left Al-Sadd and signed with Al-Sailiya. On 11 August 2018, Ghassan Waheed made his professional debut for Al-Sailiya against Al-Gharafa in the Pro League . On 9 October 2018, he had an operation in the cruciate ligament .

=== Al-Markhiya ===
On 6 July 2019 left Al-Sailiya and return with Al-Markhiya.
