= Meshaal Al-Shammeri =

Qatari footballer (born 1995)

Personal information
- Full name: Meshaal Qassem Al-Shammeri
- Date of birth: 19 January 1995 (age 31)
- Place of birth: Qatar
- Position: Forward

Team information
- Current team: Umm Salal
- Number: 11

Senior career*
Years	Team	Apps	(Gls)
2015–2018	Al-Sadd	30	(5)
2018	→ Al-Kharaitiyat (loan)	4	(1)
2018–2023	Al-Sailiya	37	(3)
2023–	Umm Salal	30	(2)
- * Club domestic league appearances and goals as of 17 January 2026

Meshaal Al-Shammeri (Arabic: مشعل الشمري; born 19 January 1995) is a Qatari footballer. He currently plays for Umm Salal as a forward.
