= Fahad Al-Abdulrahman =

Qatari footballer (born 1995)

Personal information
- Full name: Fahad Ali Shonain Al-Abdulrahman
- Date of birth: 6 April 1995 (age 31)
- Place of birth: Qatar
- Height: 1.64 m (5 ft 5 in)
- Position: Left-back

Youth career
- –2012: Aspire Academy
- 2012–2013: Fortuna Düsseldorf
- 2013–2014: K.A.S. Eupen

Senior career*
Years	Team	Apps	(Gls)
2014–2019	Al-Sadd	11	(0)
2014–2017	→ Eupen (loan)	48	(0)
2018	→ Al Ahli (loan)	2	(0)
2018–2019	→ Al-Kharaitiyat (loan)	1	(0)
2019–2023	Al-Arabi	48	(0)
2023–2024	Al-Shamal	0	(0)

International career^{‡}
2014	Qatar U21	4	(0)
2014	Qatar U19	6	(0)
2015	Qatar U20	3	(0)
2016–	Qatar U23	4	(0)
2017–	Qatar	3	(0)
- * Club domestic league appearances and goals as of 31 July 2016 ‡ National team caps and goals as of 31 May 2018

Fahad Al-Abdulrahman (Arabic: فهد العبد الرحمن; born 6 April 1995) is a Qatari football left-back who plays for the Qatar national team.

== Club career ==
=== Early career ===
Abdulrahman started his youth football career at Aspire Academy. In November 2013, he moved to Belgium side K.A.S. Eupen reserve team.

=== Al Sadd SC ===
On 1 July 2014, Abdulrahman joined the senior team of Qatari club Al Sadd SC.

==== K.A.S. Eupen (loan) ====
On 2 July 2014, Abdulrahman was loaned to K.A.S. Eupen in Belgian Second Division. He made his league debut against R.A.E.C. Mons on 30 November 2014. In July 2015, his loan was expended for a one season. in this season he played 16 games as defender and contributed to his team's promotion to Belgian First Division A. On 21 June 2016, K.A.S. Eupen announced that Fahad Al-Abdulrahman stays with K.A.S. Eupen for one season.

== International career ==
Fahad has represented his country at various age groups. He was a member of Qatar national under-19 football team for 2014 AFC U-19 Championship, and he won the championship. He played in 2015 FIFA U-20 World Cup as Qatar national under-20 football team.

== Club career statistics ==
Club performance			League		Cup		continental		Other		Total	
Season	Club	League	Apps	Goals	Apps	Goals	Apps	Goals	Apps	Goals	Apps	Goals
Belgium			League		Belgian Cup		Europe		Other^{1}		Total	
2014-15	K.A.S. Eupen (loan)	Belgian Second Division	2	0	0	0	—		0	0	2	0
2015-16	K.A.S. Eupen (loan)	Belgian Second Division	16	0	1	0	—		—		17	0
2016-17	K.A.S. Eupen (loan)	Belgian First Division A	1	0	0	0	—		—		1	0
Total	Belgium		19	0	1	0	0	0	0	0	20	0
Total	Career total		19	0	1	0	0	0	0	0	20	0

^{1}Other tournaments include Belgian Second Division play-offs

== Honours ==
Qatar U19

Winner

- AFC U-19 Championship: 2014

Al-Arabi

- Emir of Qatar Cup: 2023
