= Boualem Khoukhi =

Qatari footballer (born 1990)

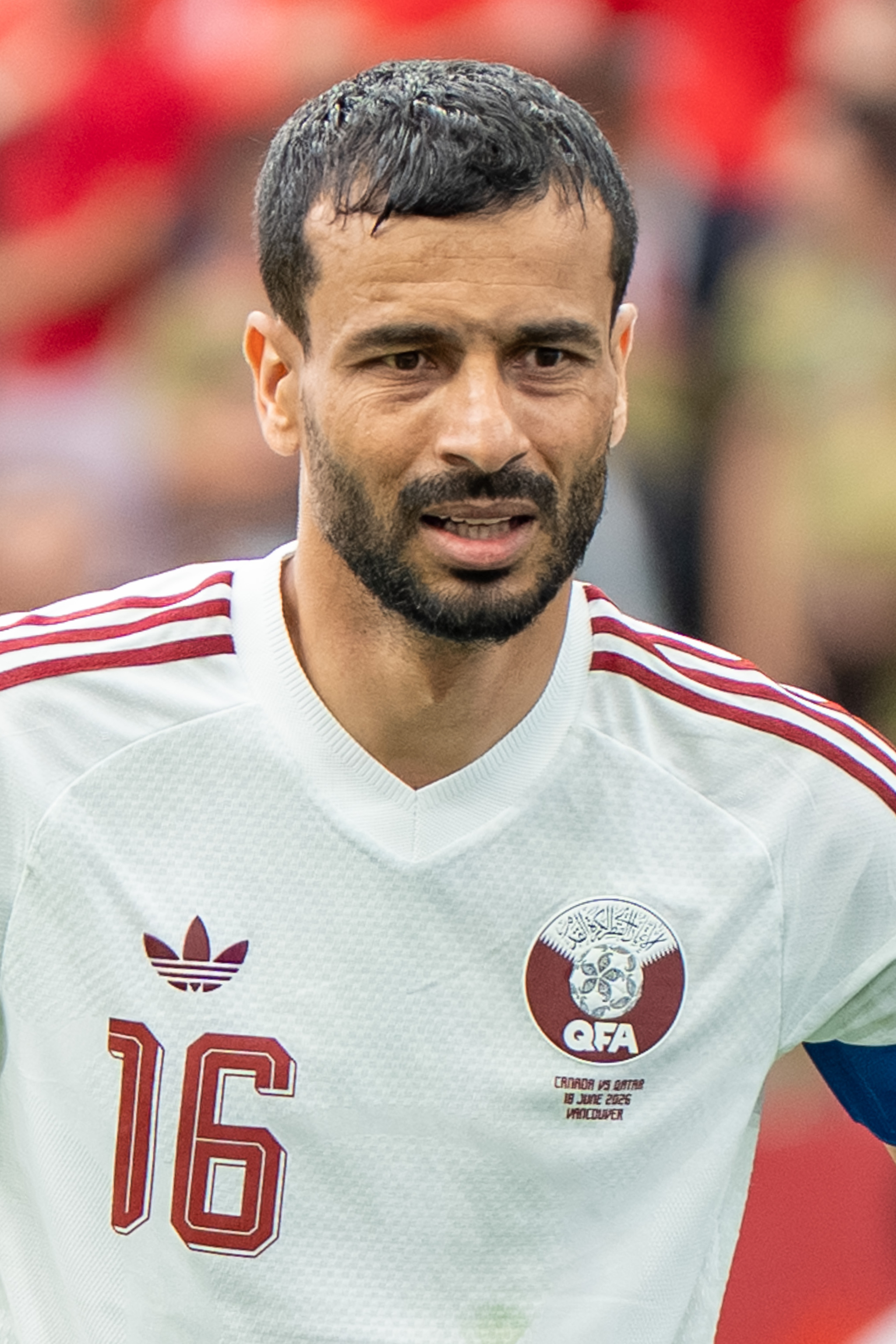
- Khoukhi with Qatar in 2026

Personal information
- Full name: Boualem Khoukhi
- Date of birth: 9 July 1990 (age 36)
- Place of birth: Bou Ismail, Algeria
- Height: 1.85 m (6 ft 1 in)
- Positions: Defender; midfielder

Team information
- Current team: Al Sadd
- Number: 16

Youth career
- 2007–2009: JSM Chéraga

Senior career*
Years	Team	Apps	(Gls)
2009–2017	Al Arabi	147	(36)
2017–	Al Sadd	141	(15)

International career^{‡}
2013	Qatar B	3	(2)
2013–	Qatar	133	(22)
Medal record
Representing Qatar
Men's Football
AFC Asian Cup
Winner	2019 UAE	Team
Winner	2023 Qatar	Team
FIFA Arab Cup
Third place	2021
- * Club domestic league appearances and goals as of 17 January 2026 ‡ National team caps and goals as of 24 September 2026

Boualem Khoukhi (Arabic: بوعلام خوخي; born 9 July 1990) is a professional footballer who plays as a centre-back for Al Sadd in the Qatar Stars League. Born in Algeria, he represents the Qatar national team.

== Club career ==
=== Youth career ===
A pure product of the junior ranks of Algeria's JSM Chéraga, Khoukhi made his debut for the senior team in the 2009–10 season. He struggled in his first season, but his career was soon revived when Farid Zemiti was hired as the head coach of the club. He became integrated into the first team, playing alongside future Algeria international Islam Slimani, and many Algerian clubs were alleged to be interested in the services of Khoukhi, including USM El Harrach.

He soon received an offer from Al Shamal in Qatar, which he accepted. However, after landing in Qatar, Al Arabi head coach Uli Stielike believed Khoukhi had exceptional potential and offered him a trial at the club. He accepted the trial and was offered a contract deal shortly after.

=== Al Arabi (2009–2017) ===
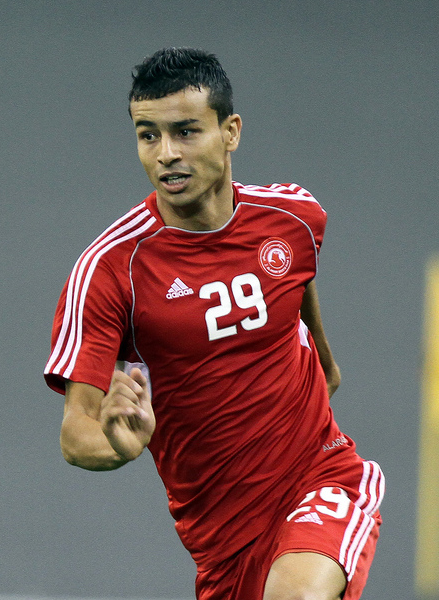
Kohukhi with Al Arabi in 2012

Khoukhi soon earned a starting spot in Al Arabi's first team after his initial arrival in November 2009.

On 5 September 2010, he started for Al Arabi in the final of the 2010 Sheikh Jassem Cup against Lekhwiya, with Al Arabi winning 1–0.

He received a loan offer from Saudi club Al Ittihad on 10 January 2014 after his performances in the WAFF Championship. He also received a transfer offer from Japanese side Júbilo Iwata, a club coached by former Al Arabi coach Péricles Chamusca. These offers came after reports that Khoukhi was planning to leave Al Arabi. Shortly after allegations of planning to move to another club, he silenced the rumors by signing a contract renewal with Al Arabi.

=== Al Sadd (2017–present) ===
In July 2017, Khoukhi joined Al Sadd. In July 2019, Al-Gharafa announced signing him on a four-year deal but Al Sadd denied the transfer.

== International career ==
=== Algeria ===
Khoukhi was born and raised in Algeria. On 9 November 2010, Khoukhi was called up for the first time to the Algeria under–23 national team for a pair of friendlies against Tunisia. The Qatar Football Association attempted to naturalize Khoukhi shortly after he arrived in Qatar, however, he refused and said that he would not be naturalized for any amount of money. He stated his desire was to play with the Algeria senior national team. Subsequently, he received Qatari citizenship in order to assist in his club's foreign player quota.

=== Qatar ===
Despite his call up to Algeria's Olympic team, he was called up to the Qatar B team on 13 November 2013 by compatriot Djamel Belmadi. When questioned about Khoukhi's call-up to the squad, Belmadi said that Khoukhi was naturalized prior to his call-up in order for his team, Al Arabi, to overcome the foreign player quota. Belmadi stated he was surprised when the QFA revealed Khoukhi was eligible to be called up to the Qatar national team. He made his official debut for the team on 25 December in the 2014 WAFF Championship in a 1–0 win against Palestine.

In the next match on 31 December 2013 against Saudi Arabia, who were fielding their Olympic squad, Khoukhi scored a brace and attained an assist to give his team a 4–1 win. On 4 January 2014, Khoukhi helped Qatar, once again, netting a brace against Kuwait to send Qatar to the finals.

In the final of the 2014 WAFF Championship, Khoukhi scored another brace defeating Jordan 2–0. This would bring his final goal tally to six thus becoming the tournament's top goalscorer and being lauded by the Qatar Football Association as one of the key-men to Qatar's 2015 AFC Asian Cup campaign in the future.

In their opening match of the 2019 Copa América, Khouki scored in Qatar's 2–2 draw with Paraguay.

==== International goals ====
Scores and results list Qatar's goal tally first.

No.	Date	Venue	Opponent	Score	Result	Competition
1.	31 December 2013	Jassim Bin Hamad Stadium, Doha, Qatar	Saudi Arabia	1–0	4–1	2014 WAFF Championship
2.	31 December 2013	Jassim Bin Hamad Stadium, Doha, Qatar	Saudi Arabia	3–1	4–1	2014 WAFF Championship
3.	4 January 2014	Abdullah bin Khalifa Stadium, Doha, Qatar	Kuwait	1–0	3–0	2014 WAFF Championship
4.	4 January 2014	Abdullah bin Khalifa Stadium, Doha, Qatar	Kuwait	2–0	3–0	2014 WAFF Championship
5.	7 January 2014	Jassim Bin Hamad Stadium, Doha, Qatar	Jordan	1–0	2–0	2014 WAFF Championship
6.	7 January 2014	Jassim Bin Hamad Stadium, Doha, Qatar	Jordan	2–0	2–0	2014 WAFF Championship
7.	6 November 2014	Abdullah bin Khalifa Stadium, Doha, Qatar	North Korea	1–0	3–1	Friendly
8.	27 November 2014	King Fahd Stadium, Riyadh, Saudi Arabia	Saudi Arabia	2–1	2–1	22nd Arabian Gulf Cup
9.	3 September 2015	Jassim Bin Hamad Stadium, Doha, Qatar	Bhutan	11–0	15–0	2018 FIFA World Cup qualification
10.	3 September 2015	Jassim Bin Hamad Stadium, Doha, Qatar	Bhutan	13–0	15–0	2018 FIFA World Cup qualification
11.	13 October 2015	Jassim Bin Hamad Stadium, Doha, Qatar	Maldives	1–0	4–0	2018 FIFA World Cup qualification
12.	13 October 2015	Jassim Bin Hamad Stadium, Doha, Qatar	Maldives	3–0	4–0	2018 FIFA World Cup qualification
13.	10 November 2016	Jassim Bin Hamad Stadium, Doha, Qatar	Russia	1–1	2–1	Friendly
14.	19 November 2018	Kehrwegstadion, Eupen, Belgium	Iceland	2–2	2–2	Friendly
15.	13 January 2019	Khalifa bin Zayed Stadium, Al Ain, United Arab Emirates	North Korea	3–0	6–0	2019 AFC Asian Cup
16.	29 January 2019	Mohammed bin Zayed Stadium, Abu Dhabi, United Arab Emirates	United Arab Emirates	1–0	4–0	2019 AFC Asian Cup
17.	5 September 2019	Jassim bin Hamad Stadium, Doha, Qatar	Afghanistan	6–0	6–0	2022 FIFA World Cup qualification
18.	2 December 2019	Khalifa International Stadium, Doha, Qatar	United Arab Emirates	4–2	4–2	24th Arabian Gulf Cup
19.	10 December 2021	Al Bayt Stadium, Al Khor, Qatar	United Arab Emirates	3–0	5–0	2021 FIFA Arab Cup
20.	26 March 2022	Education City Stadium, Al Rayyan, Qatar	Bulgaria	2–1	2–1	Friendly
21.	14 October 2025	Jassim bin Hamad Stadium, Al Rayyan, Qatar	United Arab Emirates	1–0	2–1	2026 FIFA World Cup qualification
22.	24 September 2026	Prince Abdullah Al-Faisal Sports City Stadium, Jeddah, Saudi Arabia	Bahrain	1–0	2–0	27th Arabian Gulf Cup

== Honours ==
=== Club ===
Al-Arabi

- Sheikh Jassem Cup: 2008, 2010, 2011

Al-Sadd

- Qatar Stars League: 2018–19, 2020–21
- Qatar Cup: 2017, 2021
- Emir of Qatar Cup: 2017
- Sheikh Jassim Cup: 2017

=== International ===
Qatar B

- WAFF Championship: 2014

Qatar

- AFC Asian Cup: 2019, 2023
- Arabian Gulf Cup: 2014

=== Individual ===
- WAFF Championship Top scorer: 2014
- AFC Asian Cup Team of the Tournament: 2019
