= 2016–17 Al Sadd SC season =

Al Sadd SC
2016–17 season
- Chairman: Muhammed bin Khalifa Al Thani
- Head coach: Jesualdo Ferreira
- Stadium: Jassim Bin Hamad Stadium
- Qatar Stars League: Runners–up
- Emir of Qatar Cup: Winners
- Qatar Crown Prince Cup: Winners
- Champions League: Play-off round
- Top goalscorer: League: Baghdad Bounedjah (24); All: Baghdad Bounedjah (30)

In the 2016–17 season, Al Sadd SC is competing in the Qatar Stars League for the 44th season, as well as the Emir of Qatar Cup the Qatar Crown Prince Cup and the Champions League.

== Squad list ==
Players and squad numbers last updated on 3 September 2021.
Note: Flags indicate national team as has been defined under FIFA eligibility rules. Players may hold more than one non-FIFA nationality.

No.	Nat.	Position	Name	Date of Birth (Age)	Signed from
Goalkeepers
1	(Qatar)	GK	Saad Al Sheeb	19 February 1990 (aged 26)	(Qatar) Al Sailiya
22	(Qatar)	GK	Muhannad Naim	28 January 1993 (aged 23)	(Belgium) Eupen
Defenders
	(Portugal)	RB	Pedro Miguel	6 August 1990 (aged 26)	(Qatar) Al Ahli
	(Qatar)	LB	Abdelkarim Hassan	28 August 1993 (aged 23)	(Qatar) Youth system
	(Iran)	CB	Morteza Pouraliganji	19 April 1992 (aged 24)	(China) Tianjin Teda
	(Qatar)	CB	Ibrahim Majid	12 May 1990 (aged 26)	(Qatar) Al Wakrah
	(Qatar)	RB	Musab Kheder	26 September 1993 (aged 23)	(Qatar) Youth system
Midfielders
	(Spain)	CM / AM / DM	Xavi	25 January 1980 (aged 36)	(Spain) Barcelona
	(Qatar)	AM	Ali Assadalla	19 January 1993 (aged 23)	(Bahrain) Al Muharraq
	(Qatar)	AM	Khalfan Ibrahim	18 February 1988 (aged 28)	(Qatar) Al Arabi
	(Qatar)	DM	Salem Al-Hajri	10 April 1996 (aged 20)	(Belgium) Eupen
	(Qatar)	CM	Jasser Yahya	19 December 1992 (aged 24)	(Qatar) Youth system
	(Qatar)	DM	Mohammed Kasola	13 August 1986 (aged 30)	(Qatar) Al-Khor
Forwards
	(Qatar)		Hamza Sanhaji	22 April 1994 (aged 22)	(Qatar) Youth system
	(Qatar)		Meshaal Al-Shammeri	19 January 1995 (aged 21)	(Qatar) Youth system
	(Qatar)	RW	Hassan Al Haidos	11 December 1990 (aged 26)	(Qatar) Youth system
	(Algeria)	ST	Baghdad Bounedjah	24 November 1991 (aged 25)	(Tunisia) Étoile du Sahel
	(Qatar)		Hassan Palang	2 April 1998 (aged 18)	(Austria) LASK Linz II

== Competitions ==
=== Overview ===
Competition	Record								Started round	Final position / round	First match	Last match
Competition	G	W	D	L	GF	GA	GD	Win %	Started round	Final position / round	First match	Last match
Qatar Stars League	26	18	7	1	77	23	+54	69.23	Matchday 1	Runners–up	16 September 2016	15 April 2017
Emir of Qatar Cup	3	3	0	0	8	2	+6	100.00	Quarter-final	Winners	5 May 2017	19 May 2017
Qatar Crown Prince Cup	2	2	0	0	5	3	+2	100.00	Semi-finals	Winners	20 April 2017	29 April 2017
Champions League	1	0	1	0	0	0	+0	0.00	Play-off round		7 February 2017	
Total	32	23	8	1	90	28	+62	71.88				

Updated to match played 9 May 2017
Source: Competitions

=== Qatar Stars League ===
==== League table ====
Pos	Team	Pld	W	D	L	GF	GA	GD	Pts	Qualification or relegation
1	Lekhwiya (C)	26	19	6	1	79	33	+46	63	2018 AFC Champions League Group Stage
2	Al Sadd	26	18	7	1	77	23	+54	61	2018 AFC Champions League Group Stage
3	Al-Rayyan	26	15	6	5	53	27	+26	51	Qualification to the 2018 AFC Champions League Qualifying play-off
4	El Jaish (Note: El Jaish were merged into Lekhwiya to form Al-Duhail after the 2016–17 season. As a result, Al-Gharafa, the league 5th place, entered the qualifying play-off.)	26	13	6	7	45	40	+5	45	
5	Al-Gharafa	26	12	4	10	42	43	−1	40	Qualification to the 2018 AFC Champions League Qualifying play-off

Updated to match(es) played on 15 April 2017. Source: RSSSF and Qatar Stars League
Rules for classification: 1) points; 2) goal difference; 3) number of goals scored.
(C) Champions

==== Results summary ====
Overall								Home						Away					
Pld	W	D	L	GF	GA	GD	Pts	W	D	L	GF	GA	GD	W	D	L	GF	GA	GD
26	18	7	1	77	23	+54	61	10	3	1	43	12	+31	8	4	0	34	11	+23

Last updated: 29 December 2014.
Source: Competitive matches

==== Results by round ====
Round	1	2	3	4	5	6	7	8	9	10	11	12	13	14	15	16	17	18	19	20	21	22	23	24	25	26
Ground	H	H	A	H	A	A	A	A	H	H	A	A	A	A	A	H	A	H	H	H	H	A	A	H	H	H
Result	W	W	D	W	D	W	D	W	W	W	W	W	D	W	W	L	W	W	D	W	W	W	D	W	D	W
Position	1	2	3	1	3	2	2	2	3	2	2	1	2	2	2	2	2	2	2	2	1	1	2	2	2	2

Source: Competitive matches
A = Away; H = Home; W = Win; D = Draw; L = Loss

==== Matches ====
Win Draw Loss

16 September 2016 Round 1	Al Sadd SC	4–0	Al-Kharaitiyat	Doha
19:10	Bounedjah 25', 90+2'; Al-Haidos 62'; Assadalla 77'	Report		Stadium: Jassim Bin Hamad Stadium; Referee: Abdullah Al Athbah

23 September 2016 Round 2	Al Sadd SC	2–1	Al-Ahli	Doha
19:00	22' (pen.) Al-Haidos; 66' Bounedjah	Report	77' Mubele	Stadium: Jassim Bin Hamad Stadium; Referee: Abdulrahman Al Jassim

16 October 2016 Round 3	Lekhwiya	3–3	Al Sadd SC	Doha
17:00	El-Arabi 23'; Msakni 40'; Tae-hee 77'	Report	19', 83' Bounedjah; 70' (pen.) Al-Haidos	Stadium: Abdullah bin Khalifa Stadium; Referee: Saoud Al Athbah

21 October 2016 Round 4	Al Sadd SC	4–2	Muaither	Doha
16:30	Kasola 9'; El-Hadj 11' (o.g.); Bounedjah 43'; Hassan 87'	Report	62' Kaluyituka; 77' (pen.) Ouadrassi	Stadium: Jassim Bin Hamad Stadium; Referee: Mahammad Al Shemmari (Kuwait)

29 October 2016 Round 5	Al-Gharafa	3–3	Al Sadd SC	Al Rayyan
16:20	Németh 7'; Al-Yahri 24'; Sumaila 87'	Report	26' Hamroun; 35' Xavi; 45' Hassan	Stadium: Thani bin Jassim Stadium; Referee: Salman Ahmad Flahi

2 November 2016 Round 6	Al-Shahania	0–4	Al Sadd SC	Doha
15:20		Report	6' (pen.), 78' Bounedjah; 36' Xavi; 69' Assadalla	Stadium: Grand Hamad Stadium; Referee: Abdulrahman Al Jassim

20 November 2016 Round 7	Al-Wakrah	1–1	Al Sadd SC	Al Wakrah
14:00	Moutouali 90' (pen.)	Report	60' Hamroun	Stadium: Saoud bin Abdulrahman Stadium; Referee: Bouchaib El Ahrach (Morocco)

26 November 2016 Round 8	Al-Arabi	2–3	Al Sadd SC	Doha
15:40	Jiménez 26', 87'	Report	3' (pen.), 85' Bounedjah; 84' Xavi	Stadium: Grand Hamad Stadium; Referee: Khamis Mohamed Al Kuwari

2 December 2016 Round 9	Al Sadd SC	1–0	Al-Khor	Doha
14:00	Xavi 51'	Report		Stadium: Jassim Bin Hamad Stadium; Referee: Abdullah Al Athbah

7 December 2016 Round 10	Al-Rayyan	0–5	Al Sadd SC	Doha
16:10		Report	43' (pen.), 48', 73' Bounedjah; 54' Xavi; 66' Hamroun	Stadium: Jassim Bin Hamad Stadium; Referee: Saoud Al Athbah

12 December 2016 Round 11	Al Sadd SC	8–0	Umm Salal	Doha
16:10	Bounedjah 11', 50'; Pouraliganji 24'; Pedro Miguel 25'; Al-Haidos 33' (pen.); Ibrahim 82'; Al-Shammeri 85' (pen.); Majid 90+2'	Report		Stadium: Jassim Bin Hamad Stadium; Referee: Khamis Al Marri

16 December 2016 Round 12	Al-Sailiya	1–3	Al Sadd SC	Doha
14:00	Sayaf Mohsin 87'	Report	6' Pouraliganji; 33' Xavi; 74' Ibrahim	Stadium: Hamad bin Khalifa Stadium; Referee: Sultan Al Sufyani

22 December 2016 Round 13	El-Jaish	1–1	Al Sadd SC	Doha
16:15	Rashidov 43'	Report	32' (pen.) Al-Haidos	Stadium: Abdullah bin Khalifa Stadium; Referee: Jassim Abdul-Rahman Mandi (Bahrain)

4 January 2017 Round 14	Al-Kharaitiyat	0–1	Al Sadd SC	Al Khor
14:15		Report	74' Majid	Stadium: Al-Khor SC Stadium; Referee: Khamis Al Marri

9 January 2017 Round 15	Al-Ahli	0–1	Al Sadd SC	Doha
16:25		Report	56' Al-Shammeri	Stadium: Hamad bin Khalifa Stadium; Referee: Fahad Al Marri

13 January 2017 Round 16	Al Sadd SC	1–2	Lekhwiya	Doha
16:30	Assadalla 26'	Report	16' Tae-hee; 89' Mohammed Musa	Stadium: Jassim Bin Hamad Stadium; Referee: Khamis Mohamed Al Kuwari

22 January 2017 Round 17	Muaither	1–6	Al Sadd SC	Al Rayyan
16:35	Yessoh 44'	Report	10' Assadalla; 25', 58' Sanhaji; 39' (pen.), 54' Hamroun; 90+2' Kasola	Stadium: Thani bin Jassim Stadium; Referee: Ahmad Al Sayed

27 January 2017 Round 18	Al Sadd SC	3–0	Al-Gharafa	Doha
16:40	Xavi 47'; Sanhaji 66', 88'	Report		Stadium: Jassim Bin Hamad Stadium; Referee: Khamis Al Marri

2 February 2017 Round 19	Al Sadd SC	1–1	Al-Shahania	Doha
14:35	Bounedjah 21'	Report	37' Mohanad Adnan Darjal	Stadium: Jassim Bin Hamad Stadium; Referee: Ahmad Al Sayed

11 February 2017 Round 20	Al Sadd SC	3–1	Al-Wakrah	Doha
16:50	Xavi 51', 74'; Ibrahim 81'	Report	56' (pen.) Moutouali	Stadium: Jassim Bin Hamad Stadium; Referee: Saoud Al Athbah

16 February 2017 Round 21	Al Sadd SC	7–0	Al-Arabi	Doha
16:55	Pouraliganji 5'; Bounedjah 28', 37', 45+1' (pen.), 79', 83'; Ibrahim 80'	Report		Stadium: Jassim Bin Hamad Stadium; Referee: Jorge Sousa (Portugal)

24 February 2017 Round 22	Al-Khor	0–4	Al Sadd SC	Al Khor
14:50		Report	20' Al-Haidos; 65' Pedro Miguel; 80' Bounedjah; 90+3' Sanhaji	Stadium: Al-Khor SC Stadium; Referee: Khamis Mohamed Al Kuwari

2 March 2017 Round 23	Umm Salal	0–0	Al Sadd SC	Doha
17:05		Report		Stadium: Suheim Bin Hamad Stadium; Referee: Khamis Al Marri

2 April 2017 Round 24	Al Sadd SC	4–1	Al-Rayyan	Doha
19:30	Hamroun 13'; Bounedjah 45' (pen.); Pouraliganji 45+3'; Abdelkarim Hassan 53'	Report	87' Tabata	Stadium: Jassim Bin Hamad Stadium; Referee: Tomas Bonjar

6 April 2017 Round 25	Al Sadd SC	2–2	Al-Sailiya	Doha
17:20	Xavi 15'; Bounedjah 83' (pen.)	Report	16' Shaakhmedov; 71' Lazăr	Stadium: Jassim Bin Hamad Stadium; Referee: Davide Massa (Italy)

15 April 2017 Round 26	Al Sadd SC	2–1	El-Jaish	Doha
17:30	Sanhaji 10'; Al-Haidos 24' (pen.)	Report	67' Rashidov	Stadium: Jassim Bin Hamad Stadium; Referee: Meshari Al shammari

== Emir of Qatar Cup ==
5 May 2017 Quarter-finals	Al Sadd SC	4–1	Al Kharaitiyat	Doha
20:00	Bounedjah 8', 36', 40', 45+4' (pen.)	Report	30' Tursunov	Stadium: Abdullah bin Khalifa Stadium

14 May 2017 Semi-finals	Al Sadd SC	2–0	El Jaish	Doha
20:00	Bounedjah 46'; Al-Haidos 76'	Report		Stadium: Jassim Bin Hamad Stadium

19 May 2017 Final	Al Sadd SC	2–1	Al Rayyan	Doha
19:00	Al-Haidos 56' (pen.); Hamroun 90+1'	Report	49' Tabata	Stadium: Khalifa International Stadium; Attendance: 47,000; Referee: Gianluca Rocchi (Italy)

== Qatar Cup (ex) Crown Prince Cup ==
20 April 2017 Semi-finals	Al Sadd SC	3–2	Al Rayyan	Doha
18:00	Hamroun 1', 23'; Al-Haidos 21' (pen.)	Report	54' Myong-jin; 74' Sergio García	Stadium: Jassim Bin Hamad Stadium

29 April 2017 Final	Al Sadd SC	2–1	El Jaish	Doha
18:00	Bounedjah 21'; Hamroun 73'	Report	38' Rashidov	Stadium: Jassim Bin Hamad Stadium

== AFC Champions League ==
=== Play-off round ===
7 February 2017	Esteghlal (Iran)	0–0 (a.e.t.) (4–3 p)	(Qatar) Al Sadd SC	Tehran
19:00 UTC+3:30		Report		Stadium: Azadi Stadium; Attendance: 74,560; Referee: Ahmed Al-Kaf (Oman)
	Penalties
	Rezaei (penalty scored); Ebrahimi (penalty missed); Ghorbani (penalty scored); Esmaeili (penalty scored); Heydari (penalty scored)		(penalty scored) Al-Haidos; (penalty scored) Xavi; (penalty missed) Majid; (penalty missed) Kasola; (penalty scored) Boundjah

== Squad information ==
=== Playing statistics ===
No.	Pos	Nat	Player	Total		Qatar Stars League		Emir of Qatar Cup		Crown Prince Cup		Champions League	
No.	Pos	Nat	Player	Apps	Goals	Apps	Goals	Apps	Goals	Apps	Goals	Apps	Goals
1	GK	(Qatar) QAT	Saad Al Sheeb	27	0	26	0	0	0	0	0	1	0
22	GK	(Qatar) QAT	Muhannad Naim	1	0	1	0	0	0	0	0	0	0
2	DF	(Qatar) QAT	Pedro Miguel	25	2	24	2	0	0	0	0	1	0
3	DF	(Qatar) QAT	Abdelkarim Hassan	24	3	23	3	0	0	0	0	1	0
7	DF	(Qatar) QAT	Musab Kheder	4	0	4	0	0	0	0	0	0	0
12	DF	(Qatar) QAT	Hamid Ismaeil	19	0	18	0	0	0	0	0	1	0
13	DF	(Qatar) QAT	Ibrahim Majid	23	2	22	2	0	0	0	0	1	0
19	DF	(Qatar) QAT	Hossam Kamal	18	0	18	0	0	0	0	0	0	0
20	DF	(Qatar) QAT	Salem Al-Hajri	18	0	18	0	0	0	0	0	0	0
66	DF	(Qatar) QAT	Mohammed Kasola	23	2	22	2	0	0	0	0	1	0
88	DF	(Iran) IRI	Morteza Pouraliganji	24	4	23	4	0	0	0	0	1	0
5	MF	(Algeria) ALG	Jugurtha Hamroun	21	6	20	6	0	0	0	0	1	0
6	MF	(Spain) ESP	Xavi	27	10	26	10	0	0	0	0	1	0
8	MF	(Qatar) QAT	Ali Assadalla	26	4	25	4	0	0	0	0	1	0
14	MF	(Qatar) QAT	Khalfan Ibrahim	14	4	13	4	0	0	0	0	1	0
27	MF	(Qatar) QAT	Jasser Yahya	7	0	7	0	0	0	0	0	0	0
65	MF	(Qatar) QAT	Ahmed Sayyar	5	0	5	0	0	0	0	0	0	0
73	MF	(Qatar) QAT	Mohammed Waad	2	0	2	0	0	0	0	0	0	0
4	FW	(Qatar) QAT	Abdulaziz Al-Ansari	1	0	1	0	0	0	0	0	0	0
9	FW	(Qatar) QAT	Meshaal Al-Shammeri	8	2	8	2	0	0	0	0	0	0
10	FW	(Qatar) QAT	Hassan Al-Haidos	20	7	19	7	0	0	0	0	1	0
11	FW	(Algeria) ALG	Baghdad Bounedjah	21	24	20	24	0	0	0	0	1	0
17	FW	(Qatar) QAT	Hassan Palang	3	0	3	0	0	0	0	0	0	0
70	FW	(Qatar) QAT	Hamza Sanhaji	13	6	13	6	0	0	0	0	0	0
Players transferred out during the season

Last updated: 20 November 2017
Source: fr.soccerway.com

=== Goalscorers ===
Includes all competitive matches. The list is sorted alphabetically by surname when total goals are equal.

No.	Nat.	Player	Pos.	QSL	QEC	CPC	CL 1	TOTAL
11	(Algeria)	Baghdad Bounedjah	FW	24	5	1	0	30
6	(Spain)	Xavi	MF	10	0	0	0	10
10	(Qatar)	Hassan Al-Haidos	FW	7	2	1	0	10
5	(Algeria)	Jugurtha Hamroun	MF	6	1	3	0	10
70	(Qatar)	Hamza Sanhaji	FW	6	0	0	0	6
8	(Qatar)	Ali Assadalla	MF	4	0	0	0	4
14	(Qatar)	Khalfan Ibrahim	MF	4	0	0	0	4
88	(Iran)	Morteza Pouraliganji	DF	4	0	0	0	4
3	(Qatar)	Abdelkarim Hassan	DF	3	0	0	0	3
9	(Qatar)	Meshaal Al-Shammeri	FW	2	0	0	0	2
66	(Qatar)	Mohammed Kasola	DF	2	0	0	0	2
13	(Qatar)	Ibrahim Majid	DF	2	0	0	0	2
2	(Qatar)	Pedro Miguel	DF	2	0	0	0	2
Own Goals				0	0	0	0	0
Totals				77	8	5	0	90

==== Suspensions ====
Date Incurred	Nation	Name	Games Missed	Reason
22 December 2017	(Iran)	Morteza Pouraliganji	1	(red card) (vs. El-Jaish)
2 February 2017	(Algeria)	Baghdad Bounedjah	1	(red card) (vs. Al-Shahania)
2 February 2017	(Qatar)	Pedro Miguel	1	(red card) (vs. Al-Shahania)
2 February 2017	(Qatar)	Ibrahim Majid	2	(red card) (vs. Al-Shahania)
15 April 2017	(Qatar)	Saad Al Sheeb	2	(red card) (vs. El-Jaish)
20 April 2017	(Qatar)	Mohammed Kasola	?	(red card) (vs. Al Rayyan)

== Players ==
Note: Flags indicate national team as defined under FIFA eligibility rules; some limited exceptions apply. Players may hold more than one non-FIFA nationality.

No.	Pos.	Nation	Player
1	GK	QAT	Saad Al Sheeb
2	DF	QAT	Pedro Miguel
3	DF	QAT	Yasser Abubakar
4	FW	QAT	Abdulaziz Al-Ansari
5	MF	ALG	Jugurtha Hamroun (on loan from Steaua București)
6	MF	ESP	Xavi (captain)
7	DF	QAT	Musab Kheder
8	MF	QAT	Ali Assadalla
9	FW	QAT	Meshaal Al-Shammeri
10	MF	QAT	Hassan Al-Haidos
11	FW	ALG	Baghdad Bounedjah
12	DF	QAT	Hamid Ismaeil

No.	Pos.	Nation	Player
13	DF	QAT	Ibrahim Majid
14	MF	QAT	Khalfan Ibrahim
17	FW	QAT	Hassan Palang
19	DF	QAT	Hossam Kamal
20	DF	QAT	Salem Al-Hajri
22	GK	QAT	Muhannad Naim
27	MF	QAT	Jasser Yahya
65	MF	QAT	Ahmed Sayyar
66	DF	QAT	Mohammed Kasola
70	FW	QAT	Hamza Sanhaji
73	MF	QAT	Mohammed Waad
88	DF	IRI	Morteza Pouraliganji

Players with Multiple Nationalities

- (Qatar) (Palestine) Ibrahim Majid
- (Qatar) (Portugal) Pedro Miguel
- (Qatar) (Sudan) Yasser Abubakar
- (Qatar) (Bahrain) Ali Asad
- (Qatar) (Bahrain) Ahmed Sayyar

== Transfers ==
=== In ===
Date	Pos	Player	From club	Transfer fee	Source
1 July 2016	DF	(Qatar) Hamid Ismaeil	(Qatar) Al-Rayyan	Loan	
31 August 2016	MF	(Algeria) Jugurtha Hamroun	(Romania) Steaua București	Loan + €1,000,000	
