= 2017 Emir of Qatar Cup =

Tournament details
- Country: Qatar
- Dates: April – 19 May
- Teams: 18

Final positions
- Champions: Al-Sadd
- Runners-up: Al Rayyan

Tournament statistics
- Top goal scorer: Baghdad Bounedjah (5 goal)

The 2017 Emir of Qatar Cup was the 45th edition of a men's football tournament in Qatar. It was played by the 1st and 2nd level divisions of the Qatari football league structure.

The competition featured all teams from the 2016–17 Qatar Stars League and the top four sides from the Qatargas League. Four venues were used – Al Sadd Stadium, Al Arabi Stadium, Qatar SC Stadium and Khalifa Stadium.

The cup winner is guaranteed a place in the 2018 AFC Champions League.

== Round one ==
9 April 2017	Qatar SC	1–2	Al Mesaimeer

9 April 2017	Al Markhiya	1–0	Al Shamal

== Round two ==
23 April 2017	Al Markhiya	0–2	Al Ahli

23 April 2017	Al Mesaimeer	3–2	Al Arabi

23 April 2017	Al Wakrah	1–1 (3–5 p)	Al Shahaniya

23 April 2017	Al Mu'aidar	0–3	Al Khor

== Round three ==
27 April 2017	Al Gharafa	2–0	Al Mesaimeer

27 April 2017	Al Sailiya	2–2 (3–4 p)	Al Khor

28 April 2017	Al Kharitiyath	3–3 (4–2 p)	Al Ahli

28 April 2017	Umm Salal	2–1	Al Shahaniya

== Quarter finals ==
3 May 2017
20:00

Al Rayyan	2 – 1	Al Gharafa
Tabata 27'; Al-Harazi 72'		48' Al Shammari

Jassim Bin Hamad Stadium

4 May 2017
20:00

Lekhwiya	3 – 1	Al-Khor
Tae-hee 46', 90+4'; Msakni 57'		76' Al Enezi

Jassim Bin Hamad Stadium

5 May 2017
20:00

Al-Sadd	4 – 1	Al Kharaitiyat
Bounedjah 8', 36', 40', 45+4' (pen.)		30' Tursunov

Abdullah bin Khalifa Stadium

6 May 2017
20:00

El Jaish	5 – 3	Umm Salal
Rashidov 9'; Romarinho 33', 46', 50'; Hamdallah 90'		52' Al-Mawas; 61' Sagbo; 90+1' Nadiya

Abdullah bin Khalifa Stadium

== Semi finals ==
13 May 2017
20:00

Al Rayyan	3 – 1	Lekhwiya
Kheder 65'; Tabata 81', 90+1'		77' Msakni

Jassim Bin Hamad Stadium

14 May 2017
20:00

Al-Sadd	2 – 0	El Jaish
Bounedjah 46'; Al-Haydos 76'

Jassim Bin Hamad Stadium

== Final ==
19 May 2017
19:00

Al-Sadd	2 – 1	Al Rayyan
Al-Haydos 56' (pen.); Hamroun 90+1'		49' Tabata

Khalifa International Stadium
Attendance: 47.000
Referee: Gianluca Rocchi (Italy)

GK	1	(Qatar) Saad Al Sheeb
DF	2	(Qatar) Pedro Miguel	(yellow card) 38'
DF	3	(Qatar) Abdelkarim Hassan
DF	13	(Qatar) Ibrahim Majid
DF	12	(Qatar) Hamid Ismail		(substituted off) 70'
DF	88	(Iran) Morteza Pouraliganji
MF	8	(Qatar) Ali Assadalla
MF	6	(Spain) Xavi (c)
MF	5	(Algeria) Jugurtha Hamroun		(substituted off) 90+4'
FW	10	(Qatar) Hassan Al-Haydos
FW	11	(Algeria) Baghdad Bounedjah
Substitutes :
DF	66	(Qatar) Mohammed Kasola		(substituted on) 70'
FW	70	(Morocco) Hamza Sanhaji		(substituted on) 90+4'
Manager :
(Portugal) Jesualdo Ferreira

GK	30	(Qatar) Omar Bari
DF	2	(Qatar) Mohammed Alaaeldin		(substituted off) 61'
DF	5	(Brazil) Nathan Otávio Ribeiro
DF	13	(Uruguay) Gonzalo Viera
DF	70	(Qatar) Musab Kheder
MF	20	(South Korea) Koh Myong-jin
MF	31	(Qatar) Daniel Goumou		(substituted off) 86'
MF	15	(Paraguay) Víctor Cáceres	(yellow card) 38'
MF	10	(Qatar) Rodrigo Tabata (c)
FW	7	(Qatar) Ahmed Alaaeldin
FW	9	(Spain) Sergio García
Substitutes :
FW	23	(Qatar) Sebastian Soria		(substituted on) 61'
MF	16	(Qatar) Abdurahman Al-Harazi		(substituted on) 86'
Manager :
(Denmark) Michael Laudrup

Man of the Match:
Hassan Al-Haydos (Al-Sadd)

Assistant referees:
Matteo Passeri (Italia)
Alessandro Giallatini (Italia)
Fourth official:
Jouma Al Bourchid (Qatar)
Additional assistant referees:
Salman Falahi (Qatar)
Khamis al-Marri (Qatar)

Match rules

- 90 minutes.
- 30 minutes of extra time if necessary.
- Penalty shoot-out if scores still level.
- Seven named substitutes, of which up to three may be used.
