= Xavi (footballer, born 1980) =

Spanish footballer and manager (born 1980)

Xavi Hernández
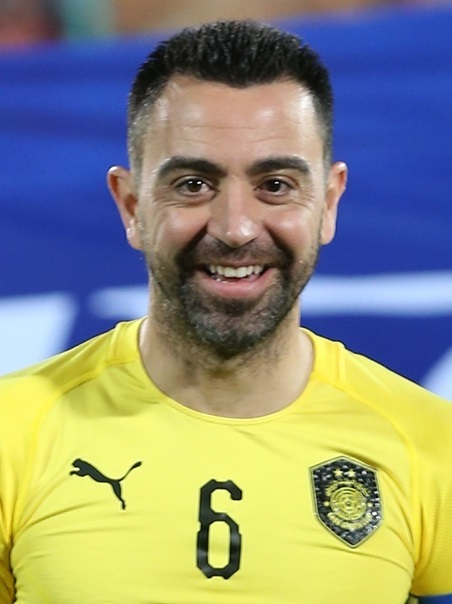
- Xavi with Al Sadd in 2019

Personal information
- Full name: Xavier Hernández Creus
- Date of birth: 25 January 1980 (age 46)
- Place of birth: Terrassa, Spain
- Height: 1.70 m (5 ft 7 in)
- Position: Midfielder

Team information
- Current team: Netherlands (manager)

Youth career
- 1991–1997: Barcelona

Senior career*
Years	Team	Apps	(Gls)
1997–1999	Barcelona B	55	(3)
1998–2015	Barcelona	505	(58)
2015–2019	Al Sadd	82	(20)
Total		642	(81)

International career
1997	Spain U17	10	(2)
1997–1998	Spain U18	10	(0)
1998–2014	Catalonia	12	(2)
1999	Spain U20	6	(2)
1998–2001	Spain U21	26	(7)
2000	Spain U23	6	(2)
2000–2014	Spain	133	(13)

Managerial career
- 2019–2021: Al Sadd
- 2021–2024: Barcelona
- 2026–: Netherlands
Medal record
Men's football
Representing Spain
FIFA World Cup
Winner	2010 South Africa	Team
UEFA European Championship
Winner	2008 Austria–Switzerland	Team
Winner	2012 Poland–Ukraine	Team
FIFA U-20 World Cup
Winner	1999 Nigeria	Team
FIFA Confederations Cup
Runner-up	2013 Brazil	Team
Third place	2009 South Africa	Team
Summer Olympics
Silver medal – second place	2000 Sydney	Team
FIFA U-17 World Cup
Third place	1997 Egypt	Team
UEFA European Under-21 Championship
Third place	2000 Slovakia	Team
- * Club domestic league appearances and goals

Xavier Hernández Creus (born 25 January 1980), commonly known as Xavi Hernández (Spanish: [ˈʃaβj eɾˈnandeθ]) or simply Xavi, is a Spanish professional football manager and former player who is currently head coach of the Netherlands national team. Widely regarded as one of the greatest midfielders of all time, he was renowned for his exceptional passing and vision. Xavi is the all-time Spanish top assist provider in the UEFA Champions League with 30 assists. He spent most of his playing career at Barcelona and is one of the few players to make over 1,000 professional career appearances.

Xavi joined La Masia, the Barcelona youth academy, at age 11 and made his first-team debut against Mallorca in August 1998, aged 18. For Barcelona, he played 767 official matches, a former club record—now held by Lionel Messi—and scored 85 goals. With the initial management guidance by Pep Guardiola and using the tiki-taka football philosophy, Xavi was part of a widely lauded midfield combination trio with Andrés Iniesta and Sergio Busquets; from 2008 to 2015 the trio together were instrumental in Barcelona's exceptional on-field successes in 7 seasons, winning five La Liga titles, three Copa del Rey titles and three Champions League titles, including two continental trebles (all three titles simultaneously) in 2008–09 and 2014–15. Xavi was the first player in the club's history to play 150 European and FIFA Club World Cup matches combined. In 2015, he left Barcelona for Qatar Stars League club Al Sadd, where he won six trophies before retiring in 2019.

At youth level for Spain, Xavi won the FIFA World Youth Championship in 1999, and the silver medal at the 2000 Olympics. He made his senior team debut in 2000 and was capped 133 times. Xavi played an integral role in Spain's 2010 FIFA World Cup win, as well as their UEFA Euro 2008 and 2012 victories. He was named Player of the Tournament at Euro 2008 and was named in the UEFA Euro Team of the Tournament in 2008 and 2012. With two assists in the Euro 2012 final, Xavi became the first player to make assists in two separate European finals. After the 2014 World Cup, Xavi announced his retirement from international football.

Xavi came third place in both the 2009 FIFA World Player of the Year and Ballon d'Or, followed by third place in the FIFA Ballon d'Or in 2010 and 2011. In 2011, he was runner up to Messi for the UEFA Best Player in Europe Award. Xavi was awarded the Prince of Asturias Award in 2012. He was awarded the IFFHS World's Best Playmaker award four consecutive times from 2008 to 2011. He was named in the FIFA FIFPro World XI six times from 2008 to 2013, and in the UEFA Team of the Year five times from 2008 to 2012. In 2020, Xavi was named in the Ballon d'Or Dream Team, a greatest all-time XI published by France Football.

After retirement, Xavi transitioned to management. In May 2019, he became manager of Al Sadd, where he won seven trophies in less than three years. In November 2021, Xavi was appointed as manager at his former club Barcelona. He won the 2023 Supercopa de España and the 2022–23 La Liga title in his first full season as the club's manager.

== Early life ==
"I've been lucky enough to be brought up on the Barcelona ethos. Which has taught me the value of being part of a team. 'Today for you, tomorrow for me.' Those qualities are essential for life in general."

— Xavi on learning the team ethos of Barcelona while at the club's youth system, La Masia.

Born in Terrassa, Barcelona, Catalonia, Xavi is a product of Barcelona's La Masia youth system, which he joined at the age of 11 from UFB Jàbac Terrassa and Terrassa. His father, Joaquim, was a former player for Sabadell in the first division. His older brother, Óscar, is a former player and manager. Xavi made his way through the youth and reserve teams and was a key member of Josep Maria Gonzalvo's Barcelona B team that won promotion to the Second Division.

Although he was initially inspired by compatriot playmaker Pep Guardiola at Barcelona, as a child Xavi also watched a lot of English football, and looked up to midfielders John Barnes, Paul Gascoigne and Matt Le Tissier.

== Club career ==
=== Barcelona ===
==== 1998–2001: Beginnings ====
Xavi's progression through the teams earned him a first-team appearance in a Copa Catalunya match against Lleida on 5 May 1998 and he scored his first goal on 18 August 1998 in the 1998 Supercopa de España against Mallorca. His debut in La Liga came against Valencia on 3 October 1998 in a 3–1 victory for Barcelona. Initially featuring intermittently both for the reserve and senior teams, Xavi scored the only goal in a 1–0 victory over Real Valladolid when Barcelona were in tenth position in the league. Sustained impressive performances meant that he became a key member of Louis van Gaal's title-winning team, finishing his debut season with 26 matches played and being named 1999 La Liga Breakthrough Player of the Year. Xavi became Barcelona's principal playmaker after an injury to Pep Guardiola in the 1999–2000 season.

==== 2001–2008: Breakthrough and vice-captaincy ====
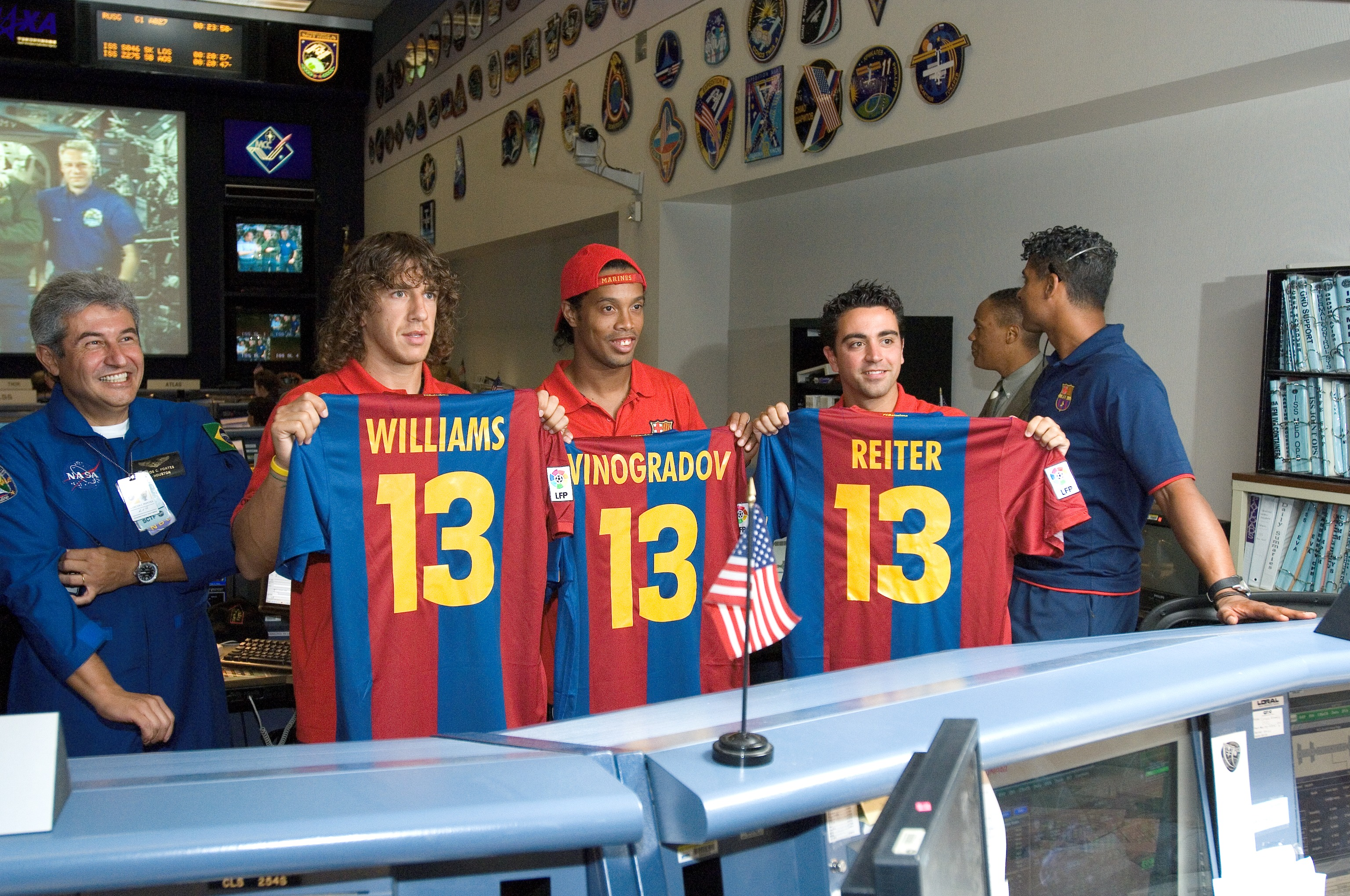
Xavi (right) with Carles Puyol and Ronaldinho at NASA's Johnson Space Center in 2006

In these years, Barcelona was on the verge of bankruptcy and struggling to keep its place in La Liga's elite. Playing midfield, but in a more defensive role, Xavi made 20 assists and scored 7 goals in those two seasons. On 16 March 2002, he scored his first goal in El Clásico against Real Madrid.

Xavi was named the vice-captain in the 2004–05 season, in which he helped Barcelona win La Liga. He was named La Liga Spanish Player of the Year in 2005.

In the 2005–06 season, Xavi tore the ligaments in his left knee in training; he was out of action for four months but returned in April and was on the substitutes bench for Barcelona's win in the 2006 Champions League final against Arsenal. He also won La Liga and the Supercopa de España.

==== 2008–2012: Sustained domestic and European success ====
"Xavi is a player who has the Barcelona DNA: someone who has the taste for good football, someone who is humble and someone who has loyalty to this club. From the first moment I saw him play, I knew he would become the brain behind Barcelona for many years to come."

— Former Barcelona coach Pep Guardiola, September 2008.

After being named Player of the Tournament at Euro 2008, Xavi spoke to Bayern Munich about a transfer, but newly appointed Barcelona coach Pep Guardiola convinced him that he was too important to the club to be allowed to leave. He was a main part of Barcelona's treble and scored the fourth goal in the 4–1 win in the 2009 Copa del Rey final against Athletic Bilbao, with a free-kick. In La Liga, one of his most significant games was the 6–2 Clásico victory over Real Madrid on 2 May; he assisted four goals – once to Carles Puyol, once to Thierry Henry and twice to Lionel Messi.

Xavi helped Barcelona win the 2009 Champions League final 2–0 against Manchester United, assisting the second goal by crossing the ball to Lionel Messi for his header. Prior to the match, Manchester United coach Sir Alex Ferguson heaped praise on the central midfield combination of Xavi and Andrés Iniesta, stating, "I don't think Xavi and Iniesta have ever given the ball away in their lives. They get you on that carousel and they can leave you dizzy." Xavi was voted "UEFA Champions League best midfielder" for his contribution during Barcelona's victorious 2008–09 Champions League campaign. Xavi was the highest assisting player in La Liga with 20, and in the Champions League, with 7; he earned 28 assists overall that season. Xavi was under contract to Barça until 2014 after extending his contract during the 2008–09 season. The new contract made him one of the club's biggest earners, with a salary of €7.5 million a year.

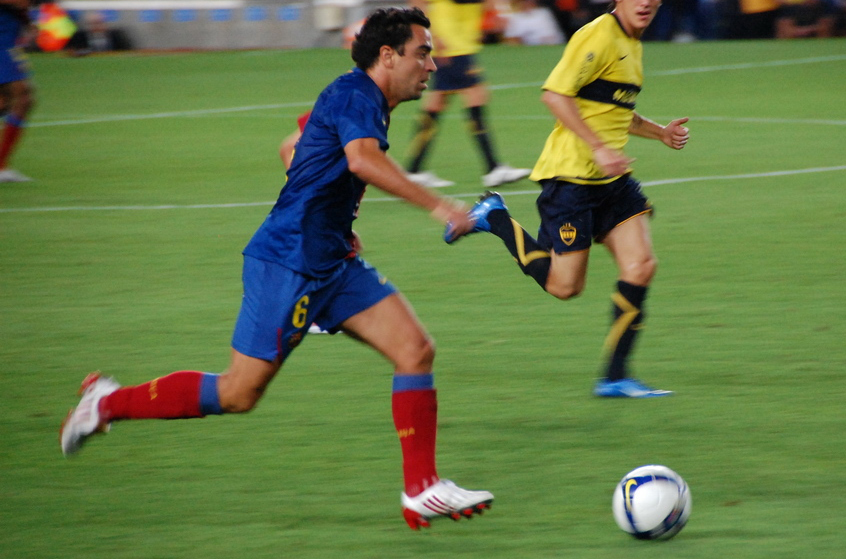
Xavi in action for Barcelona in 2008

During the 2009–10 season, journalists increasingly noted Xavi's contribution to the Barcelona team. For example:

Quite simply the best midfielder of modern football. It could even be argued that Xavi and Matthäus are the two best in this position in history. World class for several years now, it is the past three seasons in particular where the 30-year-old has been untouchable. Xavi's passing is up there with Michel Platini, he creates countless goals with genius through balls while virtually never relinquishing possession.

In the 2009–10 season, Xavi again topped the assists table and provided both the assists in Barcelona's 2–0 victory against Real Madrid at the Santiago Bernabéu. Barcelona won the La Liga title with a record 99 points, and Xavi was acclaimed Barcelona's second-best player in a season-long vote. On 3 June 2010, Madrid-based newspaper Marca awarded him third place in the annual Trofeo Alfredo di Stéfano award for the best player in La Liga, behind Messi and Cristiano Ronaldo.

"Our model was imposed by [Johan] Cruyff; it's an Ajax model. It's all about rondos [piggy in the middle]. Rondo, rondo, rondo"

— Xavi speaking in 2011 about the tiki-taka passing style introduced to Barcelona by Johan Cruyff.

On 9 June 2010, Xavi signed a new four-year contract with the club, which could be automatically renewed up to 30 June 2016 based on number of games played. On 29 November, he scored his third goal against arch-rivals Real Madrid in a 5–0 home win. On 18 December, he scored another goal against Espanyol in a 5–1 win. In the Champions League, Xavi scored a valuable goal with an assist from David Villa in a home win against Arsenal, that saw Barcelona progress to the quarter-finals.

Xavi was one of the three finalists for the 2010 FIFA Ballon d'Or, and finished third in the vote behind his Barcelona teammates Lionel Messi and Andrés Iniesta. He narrowly defeated Messi to win the Player of the Year award from World Soccer magazine.

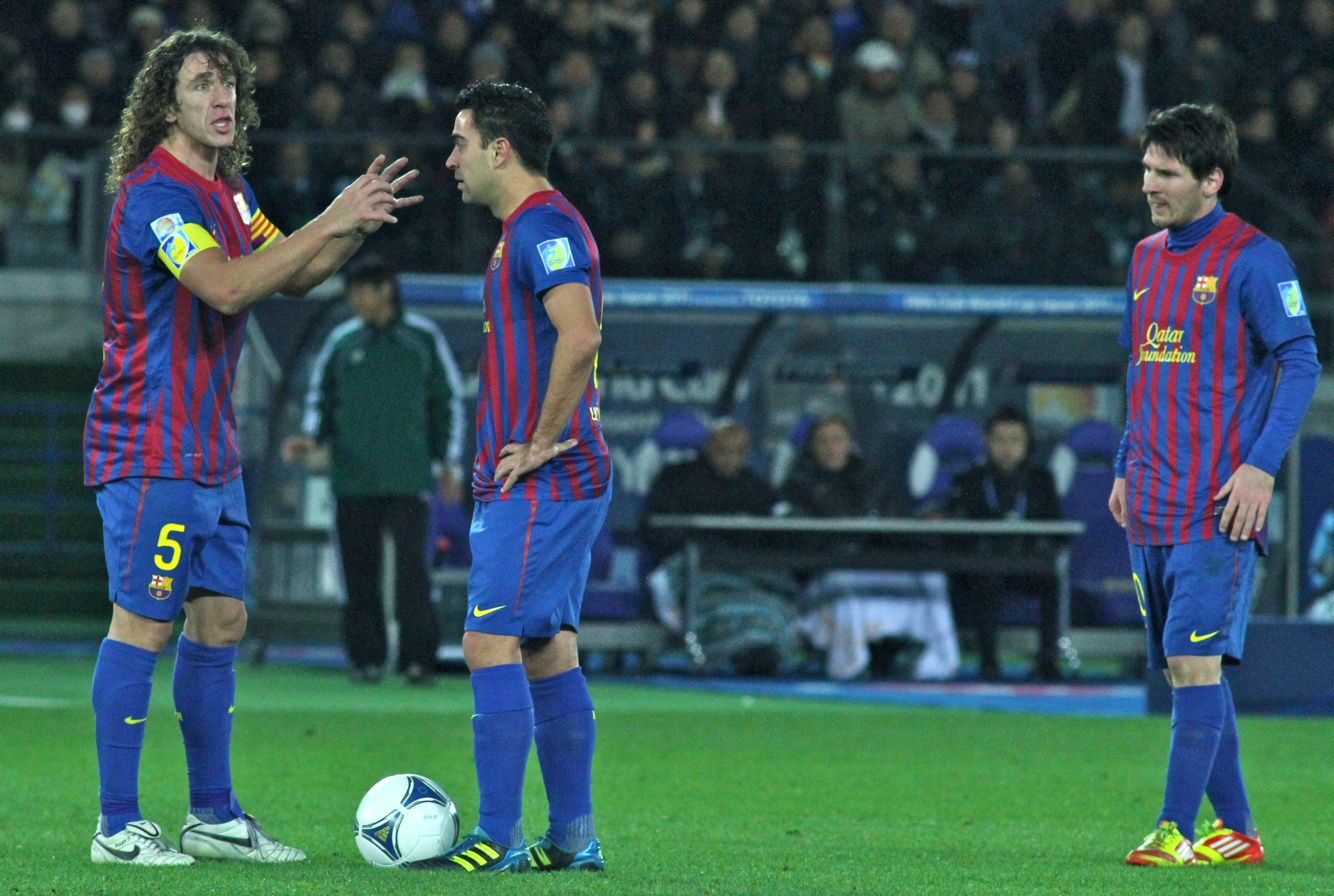
Xavi (middle) with Barcelona teammates Carles Puyol (left) and Lionel Messi (right) in December 2011

On 2 January 2011, in a league match against Levante, Xavi made his 549th appearance for the club in all competitions, matching the record held by Migueli. Xavi later became the player with the most appearances for Barcelona of all time. On 28 May, Xavi was imperious in the 2011 UEFA Champions League final at Wembley Stadium in London as Barcelona defeated Manchester United in the showpiece for the second time in three seasons, winning 3–1.

Xavi began the 2011–12 season in fine goalscoring form and seemed to grow in his influence of the team despite the long-anticipated return of Cesc Fàbregas and the promotion of Thiago Alcântara to create added competition for places in Barça's attacking midfield positions. On 18 December, in the 2011 FIFA Club World Cup final in Yokohama, Barcelona won 4–0 against Brazilian side Santos as Xavi scored a goal and made an assist to Lionel Messi. After the ball was slightly behind him, Xavi brought the ball down with a cocked leg, effectively using his ankle to control it, before slipping a pass through to Messi, who scored the first goal.

Xavi scored the winning goal in the Group H game against Milan, a vital match for Barcelona's progression in the Champions League knockout stage. In total, Xavi had the best goalscoring return of his career in 2011–12 season with ten La Liga goals, two in the Copa del Rey – which Barcelona won – and one in the Club World Cup final win.

==== 2012–2015: Later years and departure ====
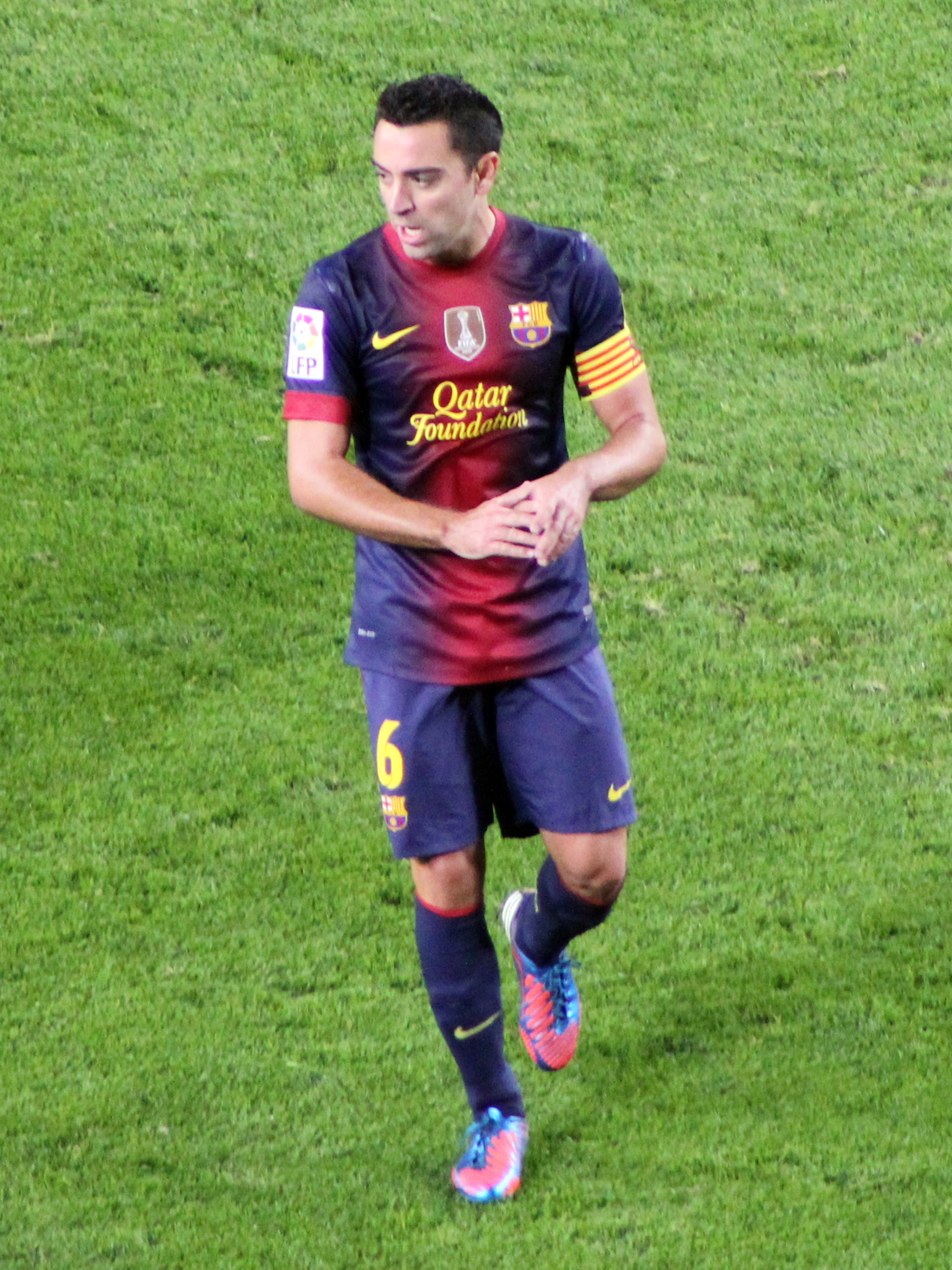
Xavi as Barcelona captain in November 2012

On 18 December 2012, Barcelona renewed Xavi's contract, extending it until 30 June 2016. He scored a goal against Real Madrid in a 3–2 win for Barcelona. Xavi was named in the FIFA World XI, along with teammates Iniesta, Messi and Dani Alves. Barcelona had virtually secured their La Liga title by the start of 2013, eventually equalling Real Madrid's 100-point record of the previous season.

On 16 January 2014, Xavi made his 700th appearance for the first team against Getafe in the Copa del Rey. For the first time in five years, Barcelona ended the season without a major trophy; they were defeated in the Copa del Rey final by Real Madrid with Gareth Bale scoring a late winner, and lost the league in the last game to Atlético Madrid.

In June 2014, it was announced that Xavi would be leaving the club. On 22 July, however, after talks with newly appointed manager and former teammate Luis Enrique, Xavi decided to stay at Camp Nou for one more season. He was also appointed as club captain after Carles Puyol's retirement. On 25 April 2015, Xavi made his 500th La Liga appearance, becoming the eighth player in history to do so. On 4 June, a farewell event was held at Barcelona for Xavi with players, managers, friends and family paying tribute to him.

On 6 June 2015, Xavi came on as a 78th-minute substitute for Andrés Iniesta to make his 767th and final appearance for Barcelona during the 2015 Champions League final, as the club won its fifth European Cup, beating Juventus at Berlin's Olympiastadion. Xavi, as club captain, lifted the trophy. This made Barcelona the first club in history to win the treble of domestic league, domestic cup and European Cup twice. Xavi, Iniesta, Messi, Gerard Piqué, Pedro, Sergio Busquets and Dani Alves were part of both treble-winning teams. Xavi's 767 appearances was a club record until surpassed by Lionel Messi in March 2021.

=== Al Sadd ===
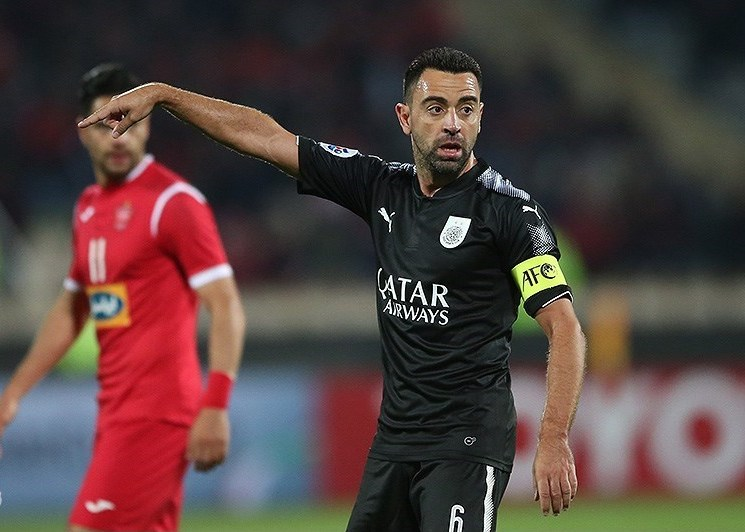
Xavi with Al Sadd, playing against Persepolis in the AFC Champions League, April 2018.

On 21 May 2015, Xavi announced that he would join Qatari club Al Sadd at the end of the 2014–15 season on a three-year contract. According to his agent, the deal would involve him becoming an ambassador for the 2022 FIFA World Cup in Qatar, and also start his coaching qualifications. He made his debut for Al Sadd in a 4–0 win over Mesaimeer on 13 September 2015, assisting in the team's first goal. In the following match, he scored his first goal for the club in a 2–2 draw with Umm Salal. Al Sadd ended the league campaign in third position putting them in a place for the next season's AFC Champions League, the elite club competition of the Asian Football Confederation. Xavi scored three goals during the season. In the Champions League, Al Sadd were knocked out from the qualifying rounds by Emirati side Al Jazira on penalties; Xavi missed his spot kick.

Xavi won his first trophy with Al Sadd following a 2–1 victory over El Jaish in the Qatar Cup final on 29 April 2017. On 10 November 2017, Xavi said that he would retire when his contract with Al Sadd expired at the end of the 2017–18 season, and would later pursue a coaching career. However, he postponed these plans and signed a two-year contract extension on 24 May 2018. In October 2018, Al Sadd reached the 2018 AFC Champions League semi-finals of the tournament with Xavi as captain but were eliminated 2–1 by Persepolis.

On 2 May 2019, Xavi announced that he would be retiring from professional football at the end of the season. On 20 May 2019, Xavi played the final match of his career, a 2–0 defeat to Persepolis in Tehran, Iran, which was Al Sadd's final AFC Champions League group match; before the match, he stated that he would like to remain in Qatar after his retirement, and that he would look to begin a coaching career, commenting: "The idea is to start as a coach in Qatar, to test myself and get some experience."

== International career ==
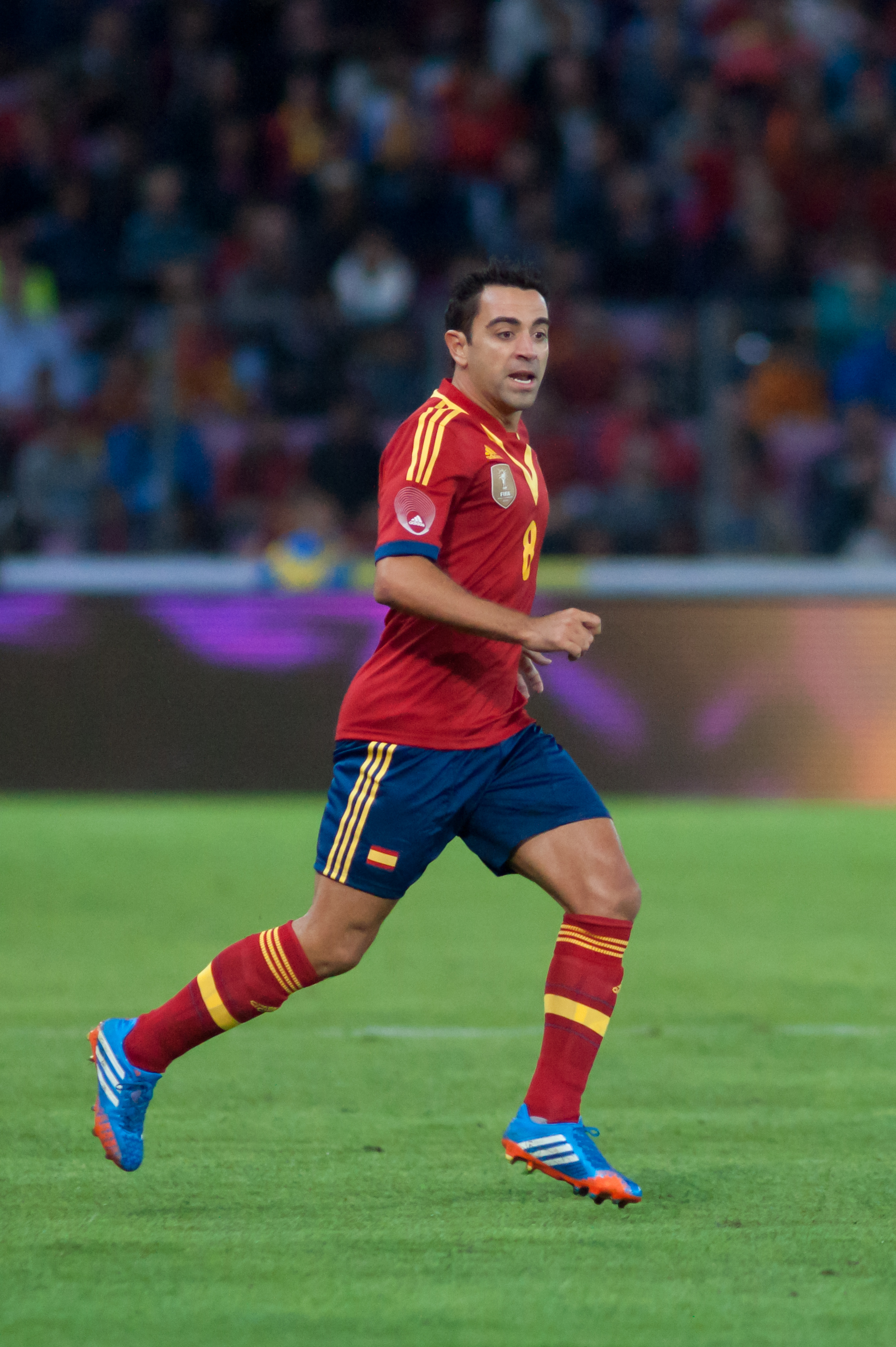
Xavi playing for Spain, September 2013

In 1999, Xavi was part of the Spanish team that won FIFA World Youth Championship in Nigeria, with him scoring two goals in the tournament. On 15 November 2000, he debuted for the Spain national football team in a friendly match against The Netherlands.

=== UEFA Euro 2008 ===
Xavi was named Euro 2008's player of the tournament after Spain defeated Germany 1–0 in the final. Xavi was dominant in midfield, where his passing and reading of the game was pivotal to Spain's success, as he led his nation to their first silverware since the 1964 European Championship. Andy Roxburgh, head of UEFA's technical committee, said: "We have chosen Xavi because he epitomizes the Spanish style of play. He was influential in the whole possession, passing and penetrating kind of game that Spain played."

Xavi scored the first goal in the semi-final against Russia, which Spain won 3–0. In the final, he made the pass from which Fernando Torres scored the winning goal.

=== 2010 World Cup ===
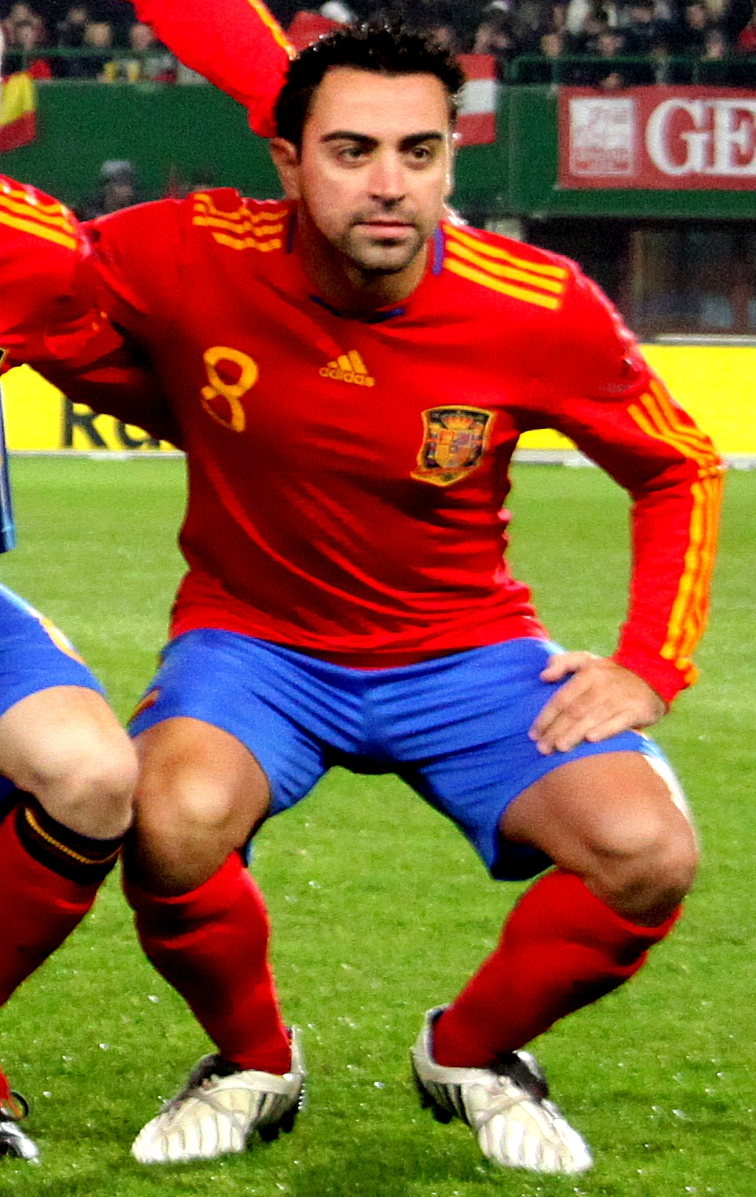
Xavi at the 2010 FIFA World Cup

Xavi was named in Spain's squad for the 2010 World Cup in South Africa, with Spain eventually winning their first World Cup. He provided the most accurate passes, a record 599 with a passing success rate of 91%, and he crossed the ball inside the 18-yard box more than any other player in the tournament; his record was broken by compatriot Rodri in 2022. In the final he made 57 accurate forward half passes. Xavi also covered 80.20 kilometres throughout the competitions, averaging approximately 11.5 kilometres per game, more than any other player. In the final, he covered a distance of almost 15 kilometres.

Xavi is the beating heart of this Spanish team, the man dictating the tiki-taka pulse of pass after pass. He may be just 5ft 7in with a curiously hunched gait but no player more influences the way his whole team plays. He doesn't score, doesn't really tackle: he just passes and passes with a precision and wit unmatched by any of his peers.

— Duncan White of The Telegraph on Xavi at the 2010 World Cup.

During the round of 16 match against Portugal, Xavi provided a backheel pass in the 63rd minute to David Villa. Although Villa had his shot with his left foot blocked by goalkeeper Eduardo, he then put in the rebound with his right foot for the winning goal. In the semi-final against Germany, Xavi crossed from a corner to the edge of the six-yard box, where Carles Puyol scored with a header into the top-right corner. Spain dominated possession throughout the competition, averaging 59% possession during their three group matches, and 44 passes per shot throughout the entire World Cup, in large part thanks to midfield trio of Xavi, Iniesta, and Xabi Alonso, who were singled out in the media for their role in Spain's title–run; Spain also completed more passes (3,547) than any World Cup team since 1966.

=== UEFA Euro 2012 ===
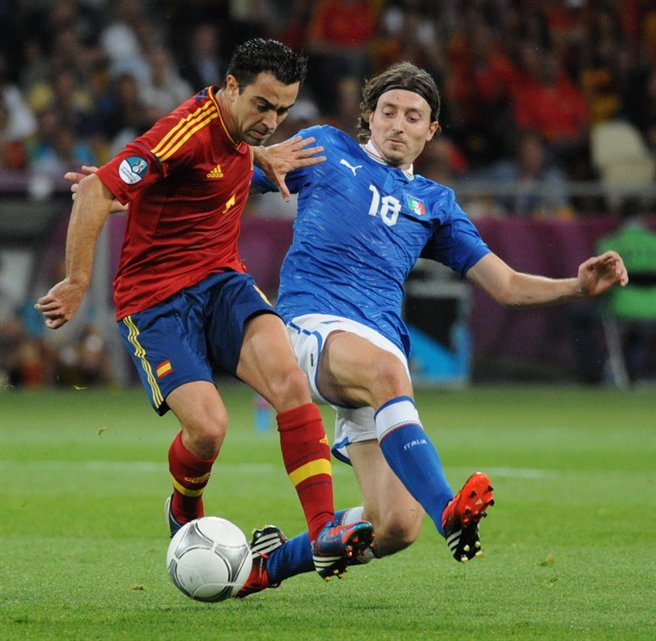
Xavi (left) turns away from Italy's Riccardo Montolivo in the Euro 2012 final.

Xavi played for Spain at Euro 2012 which Spain won by defeating Italy 4–0 in the final. Xavi attempted 136 passes (127 completed, 94% success rate) during Spain's 4–0 victory in the group stage match against the Republic of Ireland, more than any other player in a European Championship match. The previous record of 117 had been set by Ronald Koeman in a Euro 1992 match between the Netherlands and Denmark. Xavi and Andrés Iniesta made 229 passes in the match, more than the combined Irish team managed. "Pum, pum, pum, pum" was how Xavi described the rhythmic sound of the ball moving between himself and his midfield partner.

With Xavi providing two assists in the final, for Jordi Alba and Fernando Torres, he became the first player to register assists in two European Championship finals. Spain's UEFA Euro 2012 victory made Xavi the most decorated player in Spanish football history, a status that he previously shared with Carles Puyol, who missed the tournament.

=== Retirement ===
On 5 August 2014, following the 2014 World Cup where Spain were eliminated at the group stage, Xavi announced his retirement from international football, having made 133 appearances in a 14-year period. Spain's World Cup-winning manager Vicente del Bosque paid tribute, stating that Xavi was "a key part of the team's style of play" and "he was more important to us than even the manager", also adding, "We will miss him both on and off the pitch. He is a player who we hold in great esteem both personally and as a player. He is and always will be a person and a player who is greatly valued by the federation, the coaching staff and by myself."

== Managerial career ==
=== Al Sadd ===
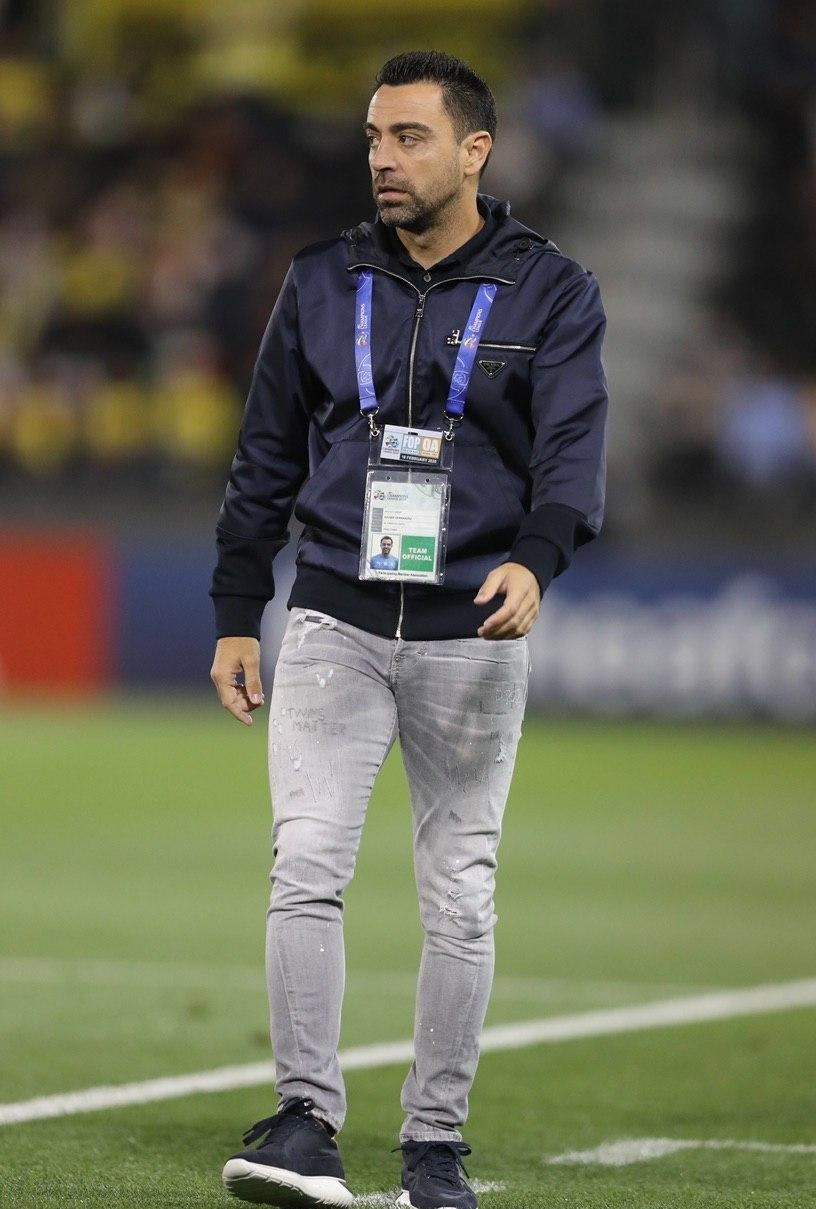
Xavi managing Al Sadd in an AFC Champions League match against Sepahan, 18 February 2020

On 28 May 2019 it was announced that Xavi would take over as manager of Al Sadd on a two-year contract. Xavi helped the club reach the semi-finals of the AFC Champions League, where they were eliminated by Al-Hilal FC 6–5 on aggregate. In the league, the club finished third. In the 2019–20 season, Xavi led his team to win one domestic trophy, the Qatar Cup. In the 2020 AFC Champions League, Al Sadd reached the round of 16 but were eliminated 1–0 by Persepolis. During his 97 games in charge of Al Sadd, spanning two and a half years, he led the club to seven trophies.

On 3 November 2021, Al Sadd drew 3–3 against Al-Duhail in his final game in-charge. Two days later Al Sadd announced Xavi's move to Barcelona after his release clause was paid.

=== Barcelona ===
On 6 November 2021, Xavi returned to his former club Barcelona as the new manager replacing Ronald Koeman, on a contract until June 2024. Following his arrival, Xavi implemented stricter rules for the players which included re-introduction of fines, early arrival for training and tracking of players' off pitch activities.

In his first game in charge, Barcelona defeated local rival Espanyol by a 1–0 scoreline at the Camp Nou in La Liga to win his first Catalan derby as manager. On 4 December, Xavi suffered his first defeat as Barcelona manager after losing 1–0 to Real Betis at home in La Liga. In Xavi's first Champions League campaign, he took charge with two group stage matches remaining. After drawing 0–0 with Benfica at the Camp Nou on 23 November and losing 3–0 to Bayern Munich on 8 December at the Allianz Arena, Barcelona finished third in the group stage which put them in the Europa League knockout round play-offs.

On 12 January 2022, in his first Clásico in charge, Barcelona were beaten by Real Madrid 2–3 at the end of extra-time in the Supercopa de España semi-final. Barcelona suffered an early exit from the Copa del Rey after being beaten by Athletic Bilbao 3–2 at the end of extra-time in the round of 16. In the winter transfer window, Barcelona strengthened their attack with the signings of Ferran Torres and Pierre-Emerick Aubameyang and Adama Traoré on loan. After a difficult first few months for Xavi, Barcelona quickly turned around their form with the new signings playing a big role in the process. The team entered a 14-match unbeaten streak starting with a 0–1 victory over Alavés in La Liga, during this run they scored four goals in 6 out of 11 matches and also qualified for the quarter-finals of the Europa League. On 20 March, Xavi won his first Clásico in La Liga as manager beating Real Madrid 0–4 in La Liga at the Santiago Bernabéu ending their five-match Clásico losing streak and extending their unbeaten run to 12 matches. On 14 April, Xavi and his men who were on the verge of a monumental comeback, were knocked out of the Europa League quarter-finals by Eintracht Frankfurt, bringing their fifteen-game unbeaten run to an end. In La Liga, he led Barcelona to a second-placed finish from ninth position when he took charge.

In the 2022–23 UEFA Champions League, Barcelona finished third in their group behind Bayern Munich and Inter Milan to drop to the Europa League for the second consecutive season. On 15 January 2023, Barcelona won their first title under Xavi, following a 3–1 victory against Real Madrid in the Supercopa de España final. On 14 May 2023, Barcelona clinched the 2022–23 La Liga title after defeating rivals Espanyol 4–2, with Xavi leading the club to its first league title since the 2018–19 season. On 22 September 2023, it was announced that he extended his contract at the club until 2025.

A string of disappointing results across December and January, including 4–1 and 4–2 cup losses to Real Madrid and Athletic Bilbao respectively, led to increased pressure and scrutiny on Xavi. Following a 3–5 home loss to Villarreal on 27 January, leaving the club 10 points behind league leaders Real Madrid, he announced that he would leave the club after the conclusion of the season.

On 16 April 2024, he was sent off after a display of dissent towards referee István Kovács during the Champions League quarter-final clash between Barcelona and Paris Saint-Germain. During the post-match press conference, Xavi expressed that the red card given to Barcelona defender Ronald Araújo by the Romanian referee was a pivotal moment that significantly influenced the outcome of the game.

On 24 April 2024, after several days of speculation about whether or not he would continue as the club's manager following successive major defeats against Paris Saint-Germain in the Champions League and in El Clásico against Real Madrid, Xavi reversed his decision to leave the club and announced his intention to fulfill his contract with Barcelona until the end of the following season after talks with club's hierarchy. However, on 24 May, he was relieved of his duties by club president Joan Laporta. Xavi was replaced by Hansi Flick.

=== Netherlands ===
On 12 August 2026, the KNVB announced that it had reached an agreement with Xavi for him to become the new head coach of the Netherlands national football team on a four-year contract. He is again replacing Ronald Koeman and the first non-Dutch Netherlands head coach since Ernst Happel in 1978. His first game as head coach of the Netherlands, against rivals Germany in the UEFA Nations League on 24 September 2026, finished in a 1–1 draw after a late equaliser by Cody Gakpo. Three days later, the Netherlands beat Serbia 1–2 in the same competition, their first victory under Xavi's management.

== Style of play ==
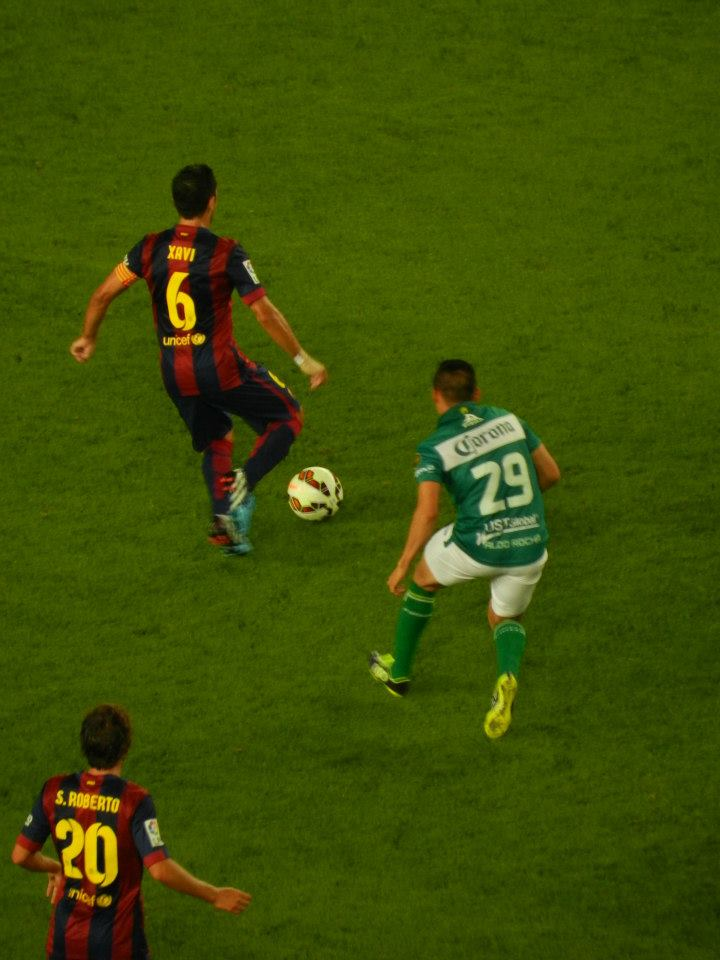
Xavi would often evade players with a 360 degree turn (la pelopina), before finding a teammate with a pinpoint pass.

Xavi is widely regarded as one of the best midfielders of all time and he had the ability to find and exploit spaces as a deep-lying playmaker. He was equally influential in building up the play and creating chances for his teammates. As he said, "That's what I do: look for spaces. All day. I'm always looking." He would receive the ball and then pass it onwards, with his coach Pep Guardiola putting it: "I get the ball, I give the ball, I get the ball, I give the ball." A composed and technically skilled player with a slender physique and a low centre of gravity, these characteristics compensated for his lack of pace or physicality. Xavi's signature move when in possession involved him performing a 360 degree turn, a feint known as la pelopina, that allowed him to move away from the opposing player, retain possession, and gave him space and time to think about his next pass. In his youth, he had played as a centre-back. While primarily a central midfielder with Barcelona, he often played as an advanced midfielder with Spain.

"I think I haven't changed at all to what I am now. I've been a passer since a young age. I liked passing with the rest of the players and my friends when we played football on the streets, in the main square, and at school. I think I was very similar to what people see in the stadium."

— Xavi on his own style of play, November 2014.

Although he was not known for his tackling ability, or for being prolific in front of goal, Xavi's outstanding vision, accurate passing, superb reading of the game, and positioning allowed him to create chances for teammates and maintain high possession of the ball. These qualities were displayed by his performance during Spain's 2010 World Cup victory, where he maintained a 91% passing success rate throughout the entire tournament, in addition to providing two assists, while Spain dominated possession throughout the competition.

Xavi's ability to control games earned him the sobriquet, The Puppet Master. Jorge Valdano opined: "If football was a science, Xavi would have discovered the formula. With a ball at his feet, no one else has ever communicated so intelligently with every player on the pitch". Barcelona president Sandro Rosell believed that Xavi, together with Lionel Messi, Andrés Iniesta and Sergio Busquets, perfected the club's tiki-taka style of play, a style introduced to the club by former coach Johan Cruyff. Despite primarily being a creative player, however, he was also capable of scoring goals himself in addition to assisting them. He was named in the Ballon d'Or Dream Team, a greatest all-time XI. Many footballers and pundits regard him as one of the greatest passers and one of the greatest playmakers of all time. Xavi was also praised for his leadership.

== Style of management ==
When describing his man-management philosophy, Xavi explained: "The matter of managing a dressing room is almost more important than the tactical matter. At the end of the day we become half coaches, half psychologists. Being an elite footballer made more empathetic to the players who don't play as much and I also know what the growth of a footballer feels like, and who needs a more loving approach. This gives me a sense of control over the dressing room". Xavi cites about his coaching influences in an interview revealing as follows: "Having a lot of coaches in my career made me take a little bit from all of them: from Van Gaal, from Rijkaard, from Guardiola, from Luis Enrique, from Iñaki Sáez, from Luis Aragonés. I got my masters in man-management from Aragonés and my masters in tactics from Guardiola".

== Media ==
Xavi has a sponsorship deal with German sportswear and equipment supplier Adidas and has appeared in Adidas commercials alongside Lionel Messi, Luis Suárez and Robin van Persie. Xavi has worn Adidas Predator boots.

In November 2014, Xavi appeared in FIFA's "11 against Ebola" campaign with a selection of top football players from around the world, including Cristiano Ronaldo, Neymar, Gareth Bale and Didier Drogba. Under the slogan "Together, we can beat Ebola", FIFA's campaign was done in conjunction with the Confederation of African Football (CAF) and health experts, with the players holding up 11 messages to raise awareness of the disease and ways to combat it.

== Personal life ==
Since July 2013, Xavi has been married to Núria Cunillera. They have a daughter, Asia, born in 2016, a son, Dan, born in 2018.

== Career statistics ==
=== Club ===
Appearances and goals by club, season and competition
Club	Season	League			National cup (Note: Includes Copa del Rey, Emir of Qatar Cup)		Continental		Other		Total	
Club	Season	Division	Apps	Goals	Apps	Goals	Apps	Goals	Apps	Goals	Apps	Goals
Barcelona B	1997–98	Segunda División B	33	2	—		—		6 (Note: Appearances in Segunda División B play-offs)	0	39	2
Barcelona B	1998–99	Segunda División	18	0	—		—		—		18	0
Barcelona B	1999–2000	Segunda División B	4	1	—		—		—		4	1
Barcelona B	Total		55	3	—		—		6	0	61	3
Barcelona	1998–99	La Liga	17	1	2	0	6 (Note: Appearances in UEFA Champions League)	0	1 (Note: Appearance(s) in Supercopa de España)	1	26	2
Barcelona	1999–2000	La Liga	24	0	4	1	10	1	0	0	38	2
Barcelona	2000–01	La Liga	20	2	7	0	9 (Note: Five appearances in UEFA Champions League, four appearances in UEFA Cup)	0	—		36	2
Barcelona	2001–02	La Liga	35	4	1	0	16	0	—		52	4
Barcelona	2002–03	La Liga	29	2	1	0	14	1	—		44	3
Barcelona	2003–04	La Liga	36	4	6	0	7 (Note: Appearances in UEFA Cup)	1	—		49	5
Barcelona	2004–05	La Liga	36	3	1	0	8	0	—		45	3
Barcelona	2005–06	La Liga	16	0	0	0	4	0	2	0	22	0
Barcelona	2006–07	La Liga	35	3	7	2	7	0	5 (Note: Two appearances and one goal in Supercopa de España, one appearance in UEFA Super Cup, two appearances in FIFA Club World Cup)	1	54	6
Barcelona	2007–08	La Liga	35	7	7	1	12	1	—		54	9
Barcelona	2008–09	La Liga	35	6	5	1	14	3	—		54	10
Barcelona	2009–10	La Liga	34	3	3	2	11	1	5	1	53	7
Barcelona	2010–11	La Liga	31	3	6	0	12	2	1	0	50	5
Barcelona	2011–12	La Liga	31	10	7	2	9	1	4 (Note: Two appearances in Supercopa de España, one appearance in UEFA Super Cup, one appearance and one goal in FIFA Club World Cup)	1	51	14
Barcelona	2012–13	La Liga	30	5	5	0	11	1	2	1	48	7
Barcelona	2013–14	La Liga	30	3	5	0	10	1	2	0	47	4
Barcelona	2014–15	La Liga	31	2	3	0	10	0	—		44	2
Barcelona	Total		505	58	70	9	170	13	22	5	767	85
Al Sadd	2015–16	Qatar Stars League	24	3	3	0	1 (Note: Appearance(s) in AFC Champions League)	0	2 (Note: One appearance in Sheikh Jassim Cup, one appearance in Qatar Cup)	0	30	3
Al Sadd	2016–17	Qatar Stars League	26	10	3	0	1	0	2 (Note: Appearances in Qatar Cup)	0	32	10
Al Sadd	2017–18	Qatar Stars League	18	6	0	0	7	1	3 (Note: One appearance in Sheikh Jassim Cup, two appearances in Qatar Cup)	0	28	7
Al Sadd	2018–19	Qatar Stars League	14	2	3	0	8	3	2 (Note: Appearances in Qatari Stars Cup)	0	27	5
Al Sadd	Total		82	21	9	0	17	4	9	0	117	25
Career total			642	82	79	9	187	17	37	5	945	113

=== International ===
Appearances and goals by year and competition
National team	Year	Competitive		Friendly		Total	
National team	Year	Apps	Goals	Apps	Goals	Apps	Goals
Spain	2000	0	0	1	0	1	0
Spain	2001	1 (Note: Appearance in 2002 FIFA World Cup qualification)	0	0	0	1	0
Spain	2002	5 (Note: Three appearances in 2002 FIFA World Cup, two appearances in UEFA Euro 2004 qualifying)	0	4	0	9	0
Spain	2003	3 (Note: Appearances in UEFA Euro 2004 qualifying)	0	2	0	5	0
Spain	2004	2 (Note: Appearances in 2006 FIFA World Cup qualification)	0	4	0	6	0
Spain	2005	8	0	3	1	11	1
Spain	2006	6 (Note: Four appearances in 2006 FIFA World Cup, two appearances and one goal in UEFA Euro 2008 qualifying)	1	4	1	10	2
Spain	2007	8 (Note: Appearances in UEFA Euro 2008 qualifying)	3	3	0	11	3
Spain	2008	9 (Note: Five appearances and one goal in UEFA Euro 2008, four appearances in 2010 FIFA World Cup qualification)	1	6	2	15	3
Spain	2009	9 (Note: Five appearances in 2010 FIFA World Cup qualification, four appearances in 2009 FIFA Confederations Cup)	0	5	0	14	0
Spain	2010	8 (Note: Seven appearances in 2010 FIFA World Cup, one appearance in UEFA Euro 2012 qualifying)	0	7	0	15	0
Spain	2011	5 (Note: Appearances in UEFA Euro 2012 qualifying)	2	4	0	9	2
Spain	2012	9 (Note: Six appearances in UEFA Euro 2012, three appearances in 2014 FIFA World Cup qualification)	0	3	1	12	1
Spain	2013	8 (Note: Four appearances and one goal in 2014 FIFA World Cup qualification, four appearances in 2013 FIFA Confederations Cup)	1	3	0	11	1
Spain	2014	1 (Note: Appearance in 2014 FIFA World Cup)	0	2	0	3	0
Total		82	8	51	5	133	13

Scores and results list Spain's goal tally first, score column indicates score after each Xavi goal.

List of international goals scored by Xavi
No.	Date	Venue	Opponent	Score	Result	Competition
1	26 March 2005	El Helmántico, Villares de la Reina, Spain	China	2–0	3–0	Friendly
2	6 September 2006	Windsor Park, Belfast, Northern Ireland	Northern Ireland	1–0	2–3	UEFA Euro 2008 qualifying
3	11 October 2006	La Condomina, Murcia, Spain	Argentina	1–0	2–1	Friendly
4	2 June 2007	Skonto Stadium, Riga, Latvia	Latvia	2–0	2–0	UEFA Euro 2008 qualifying
5	12 September 2007	Carlos Tartiere, Oviedo, Spain	Latvia	1–0	2–0	UEFA Euro 2008 qualifying
6	21 November 2007	Gran Canaria Stadium, Las Palmas, Spain	Northern Ireland	1–0	1–0	UEFA Euro 2008 qualifying
7	4 June 2008	El Sardinero, Santander, Spain	United States	1–0	1–0	Friendly
8	26 June 2008	Ernst-Happel-Stadion, Vienna, Austria	Russia	1–0	3–0	UEFA Euro 2008
9	20 August 2008	Parken Stadium, Copenhagen, Denmark	Denmark	2–0	3–0	Friendly
10	29 March 2011	Darius and Girėnas Stadium, Kaunas, Lithuania	Lithuania	1–0	3–1	UEFA Euro 2012 qualifying
11	6 September 2011	Las Gaunas Stadium, Logroño, Spain	Liechtenstein	3–0	6–0	UEFA Euro 2012 qualifying
12	7 September 2012	Pasarón Stadium, Pontevedra, Spain	Saudi Arabia	3–0	5–0	Friendly
13	11 October 2013	Iberostar Stadium, Palma, Spain	Belarus	1–0	2–1	2014 FIFA World Cup qualifying

== Managerial statistics ==
As of match played 16 November 2026

Managerial record by team and tenure
Team	From	To	Record					Ref.
Team	From	To	Pld	W	D	L	Win %	Ref.
Al Sadd	28 May 2019	6 November 2021	102	67	17	18	65.69	
Barcelona	6 November 2021	27 May 2024	142	89	24	29	62.68	
Netherlands	12 August 2026	present	6	3	2	1	50.00	
Total			250	159	43	48	63.60	—

== Honours ==
=== Player ===
Barcelona

- La Liga: 1998–99, 2004–05, 2005–06, 2008–09, 2009–10, 2010–11, 2012–13, 2014–15
- Copa del Rey: 2008–09, 2011–12, 2014–15
- Supercopa de España: 2005, 2006, 2009, 2010, 2011, 2013
- UEFA Champions League: 2005–06, 2008–09, 2010–11, 2014–15
- UEFA Super Cup: 2009, 2011
- FIFA Club World Cup: 2009, 2011

Al Sadd

- Qatar Stars League: 2018–19
- Qatar Cup: 2017
- Sheikh Jassim Cup: 2017
- Emir of Qatar Cup: 2017

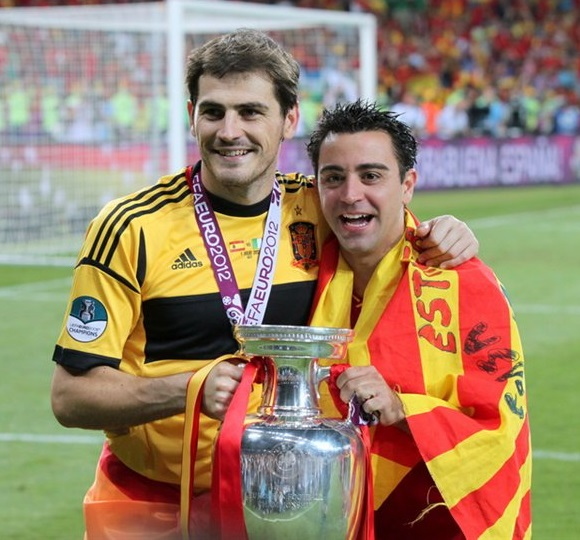
Xavi and Spain captain Iker Casillas after winning the UEFA Euro 2012

Spain U20

- FIFA World Youth Championship: 1999

Spain

- FIFA World Cup: 2010
- UEFA European Championship: 2008, 2012

Individual

- World Soccer Player of the Year: 2010
- UEFA European Championship Player of the Tournament: 2008
- UEFA Club Midfielder of the Year: 2008–09
- IFFHS World's Best Playmaker: 2008, 2009, 2010, 2011
- La Liga Breakthrough Player of the Year: 1999
- La Liga Spanish Player of the Year: 2005
- La Liga Midfielder of the Year: 2009, 2010, 2011
- La Liga top assist provider: 2008–09, 2009–10
- UEFA Champions League top assist provider: 2008–09
- FIFA World Cup Dream Team: 2010
- UEFA European Championship Team of the Tournament: 2008, 2012
- All-time UEFA European Under-21 Championship dream team: 2015
- New York City FC's Ride of Fame: September 2015
- FIFA FIFPro World11: 2008, 2009, 2010, 2011, 2012, 2013
- UEFA Team of the Year: 2008, 2009, 2010, 2011, 2012
- ESM Team of the Year: 2008–09, 2010–11, 2011–12
- Don Balón Team of the Decade: 2010
- FIFA Club World Cup Silver Ball: 2011
- FIFA Club World Cup Bronze Ball: 2009
- Globe Soccer Awards Player Career Award: 2013
- UEFA Ultimate Team of the Year (published 2015)
- Marca Legend Award: 2015
- Qatar Stars League Team of the Year: 2017–18
- AFC Champions League Fans' Best XI: 2018
- AFC Champions League OPTA Best XI: 2018
- Ballon d'Or Dream Team: 2020
- IFFHS All-time Men's Dream Team: 2021
- ESPN Deportes Player of the Year: 2010
- FourFourTwo - The 50 greatest Barcelona players of all time: 2022
- FourFourTwo - The 100 best football players of all time: 2022
- Ballon d'Or: 3rd Place 2009, 3rd Place 2010, 3rd Place 2011
- Barça Players' Award: 2011–12, 2012–13

=== Manager ===
Al Sadd

- Qatar Stars League: 2020–21
- Qatar Cup: 2020, 2021
- Sheikh Jassim Cup: 2019
- Emir of Qatar Cup: 2020, 2021
- Qatari Stars Cup: 2019–20

Barcelona

- La Liga: 2022–23
- Supercopa de España: 2023

Individual

- Qatar Stars League Best Coach Award: 2020–21
- Qatar Stars League Coach of the Month: August/September 2019, December/January 2020, September/October 2020, January 2021, February/March 2021, September 2021

=== Decorations ===
- Spanish Sportsman of the Year: 2009
- Gold Medal of the Royal Order of Sporting Merit: 2010
- Prince of Asturias Award for Sports: 2010 , (Note: Members of the Spain national football team who won the 2010 FIFA World Cup were jointly awarded.) 2012 (Note: Jointly awarded with Iker Casillas.)

== See also ==
- List of footballers with 100 or more UEFA Champions League appearances
- List of men's footballers with 100 or more international caps
- List of men's footballers with the most official appearances
- List of footballers with 400 or more La Liga appearances

Sporting positions
Preceded by Carles Puyol	FC Barcelona captain 2014–2015	Succeeded by Andrés Iniesta
