= Hamid Ismail =

Qatari footballer (born 1986)

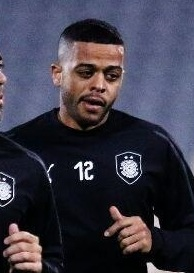
- Ismail training with Al Sadd in 2018

Personal information
- Full name: Hamid Ismail Hassan Khalifa Hamid
- Date of birth: 16 June 1986 (age 40)
- Place of birth: Doha, Qatar
- Height: 1.69 m (5 ft 7 in)
- Positions: Right back; utility player

Youth career
- 2000–2004: Al-Arabi

Senior career*
Years	Team	Apps	(Gls)
2003–2009	Al-Arabi	74	(0)
2009–2017	Al Rayyan	110	(15)
2014	→ Al Sadd (loan)	10	(0)
2016–2017	→ Al Sadd (loan)	18	(0)
2017–2018	Al-Arabi	6	(0)
2018–2020	Al Sadd	39	(5)
2020	Al Rayyan	5	(0)
2020–2021	Qatar	18	(3)
2021–2024	Al-Arabi	40	(2)
2024–2026	Al-Gharafa	10	(0)

International career^{‡}
2008–2011	Qatar U23	4	(0)
2008–2019	Qatar	56	(1)
Medal record
Representing Qatar
Men's Football
AFC Asian Cup
Winner	2019 UAE	Team
- * Club domestic league appearances and goals as of 22 September 2023 ‡ National team caps and goals as of 11 October 2023

Hamid Ismail Hassan Khalifa Hamid is a Qatari footballer who can play at right back and on the right wing. He currently plays for Al-Gharafa of the Qatar Stars League and the Qatar national football team.

== Club career ==
Ismail joined Al Rayyan in the 2009 winter transfer window. He has been used mostly as a utility player, usually playing as a right back but has also started some matches as a winger, midfielder and striker. In 2011, he renewed his contract with Al Rayyan for 3 years, despite interest from El Jaish SC.

Ismail was elected for the Best Player Award by the QFA for the 2010/11 season along with three others, but eventually lost out to Bakari Koné.

== International career ==
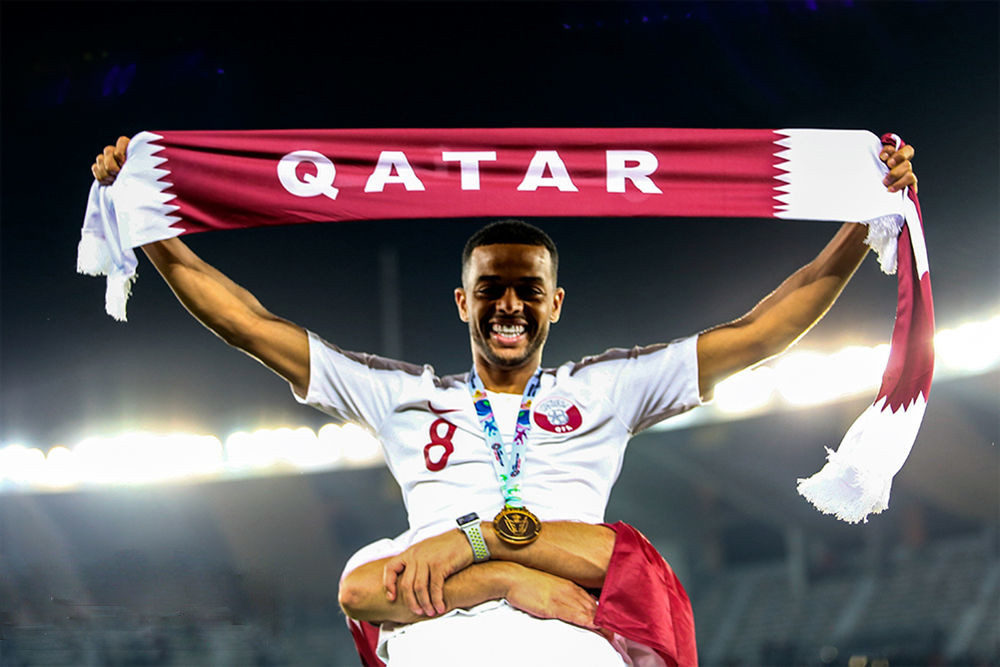
Ismail celebrating Qatar's victory in the 2019 AFC Asian Cup Final

In 2008, after good performances at club he was called up the Qatar national football team. In December 2010 he was included in Bruno Metsu's 23 players to represent Qatar at home in the 2011 AFC Asian Cup. He started the opening game against Uzbekistan in the Khalifa International Stadium where Qatar lost 2–0.

== Honours ==
=== Club ===
Al-Arabi

- Sheikh Jassim Cup: 2008

Al Rayyan

- Emir of Qatar Cup: 2010, 2011

Al-Sadd

- Qatar Stars League: 2018–19
- Emir of Qatar Cup: 2014, 2017
- Sheikh Jassim Cup: 2014
- Qatar Cup: 2017

=== International ===
- AFC Asian Cup: 2019

== Personal ==
Ismail comes from a footballing family. His father is a former football player, both of his brothers play for Qatari clubs, and his two sisters are members of the Qatar women's national football team. He is nicknamed "Hamoudi" by his family.

Ismail's future plans were to become a legal consultant, but he was no longer able to study full-time due to his football career.
