= Hassan Al-Haydos =

Qatari footballer (born 1990)

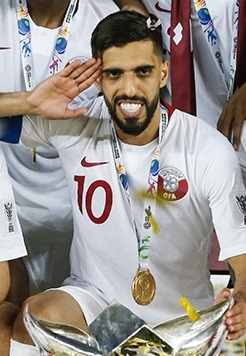
- Al-Haydos with Qatar in 2019

Personal information
- Full name: Hassan Khalid Hassan Al-Haydos
- Date of birth: 11 December 1990 (age 35)
- Place of birth: Doha, Qatar
- Height: 1.74 m (5 ft 9 in)
- Position: Forward

Team information
- Current team: Al-Sadd
- Number: 10

Youth career
- 1998–2007: Al-Sadd

Senior career*
Years	Team	Apps	(Gls)
2006–	Al-Sadd	510	(102)

International career^{‡}
2007–2009	Qatar U20	4	(4)
2007–2013	Qatar U23	14	(6)
2008–	Qatar	194	(43)
Medal record
Representing Qatar
AFC Asian Cup
Winner	2019	Team
Winner	2023	Team
Arabian Gulf Cup
Winner	2014
FIFA Arab Cup
Third place	2021	Team
- * Club domestic league appearances and goals as of 17 January 2026 ‡ National team caps and goals as of 13 November 2026

Hassan Khalid Hassan Al-Haydos (Arabic: حَسَن خَالِد حَسَن الْهَيْدُوس; born 11 December 1990) is a Qatari professional footballer who plays as a forward for and captains Qatar Stars League club Al Sadd and the Qatar national team.

== Club career ==
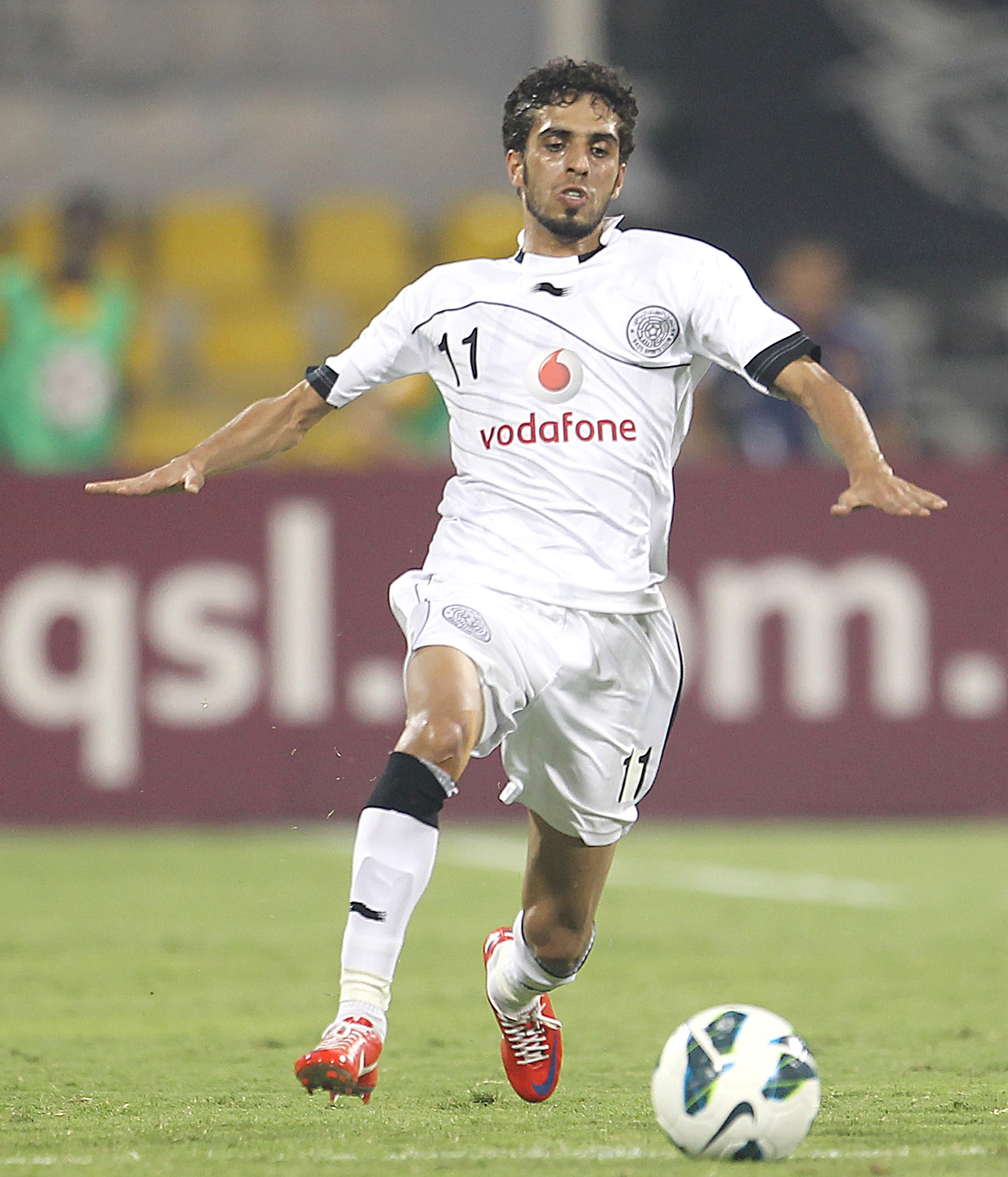
Al-Haydos playing for Al Sadd in a Stars League match in 2012

Al-Haydos started playing football for Al Sadd at the age of eight, advancing through the ranks until he reached the first team at age seventeen. He had support and guidance early on from Jafal Rashed Al-Kuwari.

He was one of the players to take a penalty kick in the penalty-shootout against Jeonbuk in the 2011 AFC Champions League final, scoring after the ball deflected off the top post. The victory ensured Al Sadd would earn a place in the FIFA Club World Cup as the representative for Asia. In the third-place match between Al Sadd and Kashiwa Reysol, he was again selected to take one of the penalty kicks after the match had ended 0–0. The penalty shoot-out was won by Al Sadd 5–3.

He was voted as the 'Best Qatari Player' in 2014 in a poll conducted by Doha Stadium, receiving 58 out of 104 votes from a panel of analysts, coaches and administrators.

== International career ==
Al-Haydos made his debut for the Qatar Olympic team in 2007, coming off the bench to score a late goal against Japan in the 2008 Summer Olympic Qualifiers in order to help his team salvage a 2–1 win. He featured in two other matches in the competition, one against Saudi Arabia, and one against Vietnam, where he scored a goal; both as second-half substitutes. He also played a large part in the 2012 Summer Olympic Qualifiers as the captain, scoring a goal against India in the preliminary stage. He played all the matches in the group stage, scoring a goal against Oman, and one against Saudi Arabia after being set up by Saleh Badr to give Qatar a 2–1 win and hope for qualifying for the Olympics. He won the Man of the Match award.

Al-Haydos made his debut for the senior Qatar national team in a 2010 FIFA World Cup qualifying match against Bahrain on 10 September 2008.

Al Haydos participated in the 2021 CONCACAF Gold Cup and the 2019 Copa América as part of Qatar national team's preparation for the 2022 FIFA World Cup. On 20 November 2022, Al Haydos played his first ever World Cup match against Ecuador, which was also Qatar's first ever match in the competition.

After winning 2 Asian Cups as captain, in 2019 and 2023, Al Haydos announced his retirement from International football on 16 March 2024. He made 183 appearances and scored 41 goals for the national side, making him the most capped Qatari footballer ever and one of the highest top scorers.

In July 2025, Al-Haydos returned to the Qatar national team and participated in the team's training camp in Europe to prepare for the AFC third round of the 2026 World Cup qualifiers.

At the 2026 FIFA World Cup, Al-Haydos scored in 42nd minutes in the group match versus Bosnia and Herzegovina. This was the only goal scored by a Qatar player in this tournament, their other goal coming from an own goal vs Switzerland.

== Career statistics ==
=== Club ===
As of match played 9 December 2025

Appearances and goals by club, season and competition
Club	Season	League			National cup (Note: Includes Emir of Qatar Cup, Qatar Crown Prince Cup)		League cup (Note: Includes Sheikh Jassim Cup, Qatari Stars Cup)		Asia		Other		Total	
Club	Season	Division	Apps	Goals	Apps	Goals	Apps	Goals	Apps	Goals	Apps	Goals	Apps	Goals
Al-Sadd	2006–07	Qatar Stars League	8	0	2	0	0	0	0	0	–		10	0
Al-Sadd	2007–08	Qatar Stars League	16	2	2	0	0	0	1	0	–		19	2
Al-Sadd	2008–09	Qatar Stars League	15	2	2	0	1	1	2	0	–		20	3
Al-Sadd	2009–10	Qatar Stars League	15	6	1	1	2	2	5 (Note: Appearances in AFC Champions League)	0	–		23	9
Al-Sadd	2010–11	Qatar Stars League	18	1	1	0	1	1	11	1	3 (Note: Appearances in FIFA Club World Cup)	0	34	3
Al-Sadd	2011–12	Qatar Stars League	13	2	2	0	1	0	0	0	–		16	2
Al-Sadd	2012–13	Qatar Stars League	22	5	5	1	1	0	0	0	–		28	6
Al-Sadd	2013–14	Qatar Stars League	24	5	4	2	5	1	9	0	–		42	8
Al-Sadd	2014–15	Qatar Stars League	23	11	4	3	1	0	10	3	–		38	17
Al-Sadd	2015–16	Qatar Stars League	25	12	4	4	1	0	1	0	–		31	16
Al-Sadd	2016–17	Qatar Stars League	19	7	5	3	0	0	1	0	–		25	10
Al-Sadd	2017–18	Qatar Stars League	21	12	4	1	1	0	10	0	–		36	13
Al-Sadd	2018–19	Qatar Stars League	20	10	3	0	0	0	11	2	–		34	12
Al-Sadd	2019–20	Qatar Stars League	18	8	4	1	1	0	6	3	3	1	30	12
Al-Sadd	2020–21	Qatar Stars League	18	3	4	0	1	0	6	1	–		29	4
Al-Sadd	2021–22	Qatar Stars League	19	7	1	0	0	0	6	1	–		26	8
Al-Sadd	2022–23	Qatar Stars League	13	2	6	1	1	0	0	0	–		20	3
Al-Sadd	2023–24	Qatar Stars League	21	4	3	0	0	0	6	0	4 (Note: Appearances in Arab Club Champions Cup)	0	34	4
Al-Sadd	2024–25	Qatar Stars League	19	3	2	0	2	0	6	1	1	0	30	4
Al-Sadd	2025-26	Qatar Stars League	7	0					3	1			10	1
Career total			354	102	59	17	19	5	84	13	11	1	531	137

=== International ===
As of match played 13 November 2026

Appearances and goals by national team and year
National team	Year	Apps	Goals
Qatar	2008	5	0
Qatar	2009	13	0
Qatar	2010	4	0
Qatar	2011	3	0
Qatar	2012	8	0
Qatar	2013	18	1
Qatar	2014	14	2
Qatar	2015	13	6
Qatar	2016	11	5
Qatar	2017	17	6
Qatar	2018	12	4
Qatar	2019	20	3
Qatar	2020	4	1
Qatar	2021	22	5
Qatar	2022	9	3
Qatar	2023	5	2
Qatar	2024	8	3
Qatar	2025	1	0
Qatar	2026	7	2
Total		194	43

Scores and results list Qatar's goal tally first.

List of international goals scored by Hassan Al-Haydos
No.	Date	Venue	Opponent	Score	Result	Competition
–	30 December 2008	Jassim bin Hamad Stadium, Doha, Qatar	Libya	2–1	5–2	Unofficial friendly
1.	13 October 2013	Jassim bin Hamad Stadium, Doha, Qatar	Yemen	2–0	6–0	2015 AFC Asian Cup qualification
2.	6 October 2014	Abdullah bin Khalifa Stadium, Doha, Qatar	Uzbekistan	2–0	3–0	Friendly
3.	23 November 2014	King Fahd International Stadium, Riyadh, Saudi Arabia	Oman	1–1	3–1	22nd Arabian Gulf Cup
4.	19 January 2015	Stadium Australia, Sydney, Australia	Bahrain	1–1	1–2	2015 AFC Asian Cup
5.	28 August 2015	Jassim bin Hamad Stadium, Doha, Qatar	Singapore	3–0	4–0	Friendly
6.	3 September 2015	Jassim bin Hamad Stadium, Doha, Qatar	Bhutan	4–0	15–0	2018 FIFA World Cup qualification
7.	3 September 2015	Jassim bin Hamad Stadium, Doha, Qatar	Bhutan	15–0	15–0	2018 FIFA World Cup qualification
8.	17 November 2015	Changlimithang Stadium, Thimphu, Bhutan	Bhutan	2–0	3–0	2018 FIFA World Cup qualification
9.	17 November 2015	Changlimithang Stadium, Thimphu, Bhutan	Bhutan	3–0	3–0	2018 FIFA World Cup qualification
10.	24 March 2016	Jassim Bin Hamad Stadium, Doha, Qatar	Hong Kong	1–0	2–0	2018 FIFA World Cup qualification
11.	25 August 2016	Jassim Bin Hamad Stadium, Doha, Qatar	Thailand	1–0	3–0	Friendly
12.	25 August 2016	Jassim Bin Hamad Stadium, Doha, Qatar	Thailand	3–0	3–0	Friendly
13.	6 October 2016	Suwon World Cup Stadium, Suwon, South Korea	South Korea	1–1	2–3	2018 FIFA World Cup qualification
14.	11 October 2016	Jassim Bin Hamad Stadium, Doha, Qatar	Syria	1–0	1–0	2018 FIFA World Cup qualification
15.	14 June 2017	Jassim Bin Hamad Stadium, Doha, Qatar	South Korea	1–0	3–2	2018 FIFA World Cup qualification
16.	14 June 2017	Jassim Bin Hamad Stadium, Doha, Qatar	South Korea	3–2	3–2	2018 FIFA World Cup qualification
17.	23 August 2017	Jassim Bin Hamad Stadium, Doha, Qatar	Turkmenistan	1–0	2–1	Friendly
18.	23 August 2017	Jassim Bin Hamad Stadium, Doha, Qatar	Turkmenistan	2–0	2–1	Friendly
19.	10 October 2017	Jassim Bin Hamad Stadium, Doha, Qatar	Curaçao	1–0	1–2	Friendly
20.	29 December 2017	Jaber Al-Ahmad International Stadium, Kuwait City, Kuwait	Bahrain	1–0	1–1	23rd Arabian Gulf Cup
21.	11 September 2018	Khalifa International Stadium, Doha, Qatar	Palestine	3–0	3–0	Friendly
22.	12 October 2018	Jassim Bin Hamad Stadium, Doha, Qatar	Ecuador	3–0	4–3	Friendly
23.	19 November 2018	Kehrwegstadion, Eupen, Belgium	Iceland	1–0	2–2	Friendly
24.	31 December 2018	Khalifa International Stadium, Doha, Qatar	Iran	1–1	1–2	Friendly
25.	29 January 2019	Mohammed bin Zayed Stadium, Abu Dhabi, United Arab Emirates	United Arab Emirates	3–0	4–0	2019 AFC Asian Cup
26.	5 September 2019	Jassim bin Hamad Stadium, Doha, Qatar	Afghanistan	3–0	6–0	2022 FIFA World Cup qualification
27.	2 December 2019	Khalifa International Stadium, Doha, Qatar	United Arab Emirates	3–1	4–2	24th Arabian Gulf Cup
28.	13 November 2020	BSFZ-Arena, Maria Enzersdorf, Austria	Costa Rica	1–0	1–1	Friendly
29.	27 March 2021	Nagyerdei Stadion, Debrecen, Hungary	Azerbaijan	1–1	2–1	Friendly
30.	27 March 2021	Nagyerdei Stadion, Debrecen, Hungary	Azerbaijan	2–1	2–1	Friendly
31.	7 June 2021	Jassim bin Hamad Stadium, Doha, Qatar	Oman	1–0	1–0	2022 FIFA World Cup qualification
32.	13 July 2021	BBVA Stadium, Houston, United States	Panama	3–2	3–3	2021 CONCACAF Gold Cup
33.	6 December 2021	Al Bayt Stadium, Al Khor, Qatar	Iraq	3–0	3–0	2021 FIFA Arab Cup
34.	27 September 2022	Franz Horr Stadium, Vienna, Austria	Chile	2–1	2–2	Friendly
35.	23 October 2022	Estadio La Rosaleda, Málaga, Spain	Guatemala	1–0	2–0	Friendly
36.	23 October 2022	Estadio La Rosaleda, Málaga, Spain	Guatemala	2–0	2–0	Friendly
37.	7 September 2023	Al Janoub Stadium, Al Wakrah, Qatar	Kenya	1–1	1–2	Friendly
38.	16 November 2023	Khalifa International Stadium, Doha, Qatar	Afghanistan	1–0	8–1	2026 FIFA World Cup qualification
39.	22 January 2024	Khalifa International Stadium, Doha, Qatar	China	1–0	1–0	2023 AFC Asian Cup
40.	29 January 2024	Al Bayt Stadium, Al Khor, Qatar	Palestine	1–1	2–1	2023 AFC Asian Cup
41.	3 February 2024	Al Bayt Stadium, Al Khor, Qatar	Uzbekistan	1–0	1–1 (a.e.t.)	2023 AFC Asian Cup
42.	24 June 2026	Lumen Field, Seattle, United States	Bosnia and Herzegovina	1–2	1–3	2026 FIFA World Cup
43.	24 September 2026	Prince Abdullah Al-Faisal Sports City Stadium, Jeddah, Saudi Arabia	Bahrain	2–0	2–0	27th Arabian Gulf Cup

== Honours ==
Al Sadd

- Qatar Stars League: 2006–07, 2012–13, 2018–19, 2020–21, 2021–22, 2023–24, 2024–25, 2025–26
- Emir of Qatar Cup: 2007, 2014, 2015, 2017, 2020, 2021, 2024
- Qatar Cup: 2007, 2008, 2017, 2020, 2021, 2025
- Sheikh Jassem Cup: 2014, 2017, 2019
- Qatari Stars Cup: 2010, 2019-20
- AFC Champions League: 2011
- Qatar-UAE Super Shield: 2026
- FIFA Club World Cup third place: 2011

Qatar

- AFC Asian Cup: 2019, 2023
- Arabian Gulf Cup: 2014

Individual

- Qatar Football Association Most Promising Player: 2008
- Estad Doha Qatar Player of the Year: 2014
- Qatar Football Association Player of the Year (1): 2015
- AFC Asian Cup Team of the Tournament: 2019, 2023

== See also ==
- List of men's footballers with 100 or more international caps
- List of one-club men in association football
