= Abdurahman Al-Harazi =

Qatari footballer (born 1994)

Personal information
- Full name: Abdurahman Mohammed Al-Harazi
- Date of birth: 1 January 1994 (age 32)
- Place of birth: Qatar
- Position: Winger

Team information
- Current team: Al-Khor
- Number: 16

Senior career*
Years	Team	Apps	(Gls)
2013–2016	Al-Sailiya	59	(14)
2016–2025	Al-Rayyan	76	(2)
2017–2018	→ Al-Sailiya (loan)	9	(1)
2021–2022	→ Al-Ahli (loan)	18	(2)
2025–	Al-Khor	0	(0)
- * Club domestic league appearances and goals

Abdurahman Al-Harazi (Arabic:عبد الرحمن الحرازي) (born 1 January 1994) is a Qatari footballer. He currently plays for Al-Khor as a winger.
