= Jugurtha Hamroun =

Algerian footballer (born 1989)

Jugurtha Hamroun ⵊⵓⴳⵓⵔⵜⴰ ⵀⴰⵎⵔⵓⵏ
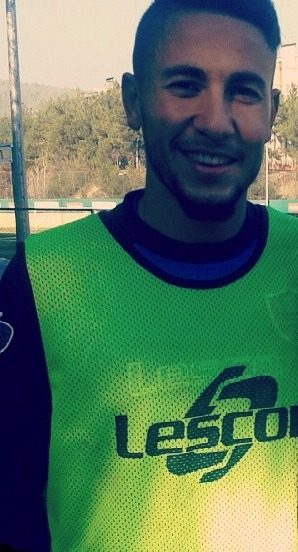
- Hamroun with Karabükspor in 2014

Personal information
- Date of birth: 27 January 1989 (age 37)
- Place of birth: Bouzeguene, Algeria
- Height: 1.75 m (5 ft 9 in)
- Position: Winger

Youth career
- 2001–2006: Guingamp

Senior career*
Years	Team	Apps	(Gls)
2006–2008	Guingamp B	43	(8)
2008–2011	Guingamp	21	(0)
2011–2012	Chernomorets Burgas	14	(7)
2012–2014	Karabükspor	41	(1)
2015	Oțelul Galați	11	(4)
2015–2017	FCSB	31	(8)
2016–2017	→ Al Sadd SC (loan)	20	(6)
2017–2019	Al Sadd SC	19	(12)
2018–2019	→ Al Kharaitiyat (loan)	12	(1)
2019	→ Qatar SC (loan)	6	(0)
2019–2021	Erzurumspor FK	32	(7)
2021	Samsunspor	14	(2)
2021–2023	Al-Markhiya SC	18	(7)
2023–2024	Al-Khor SC	9	(5)
2024	JS Kabylie	4	(0)
2025–2026	CSO Băicoi	1	(0)
Total		306	(78)

International career^{‡}
2011	Algeria U23	4	(0)
- * Club domestic league appearances and goals as of 29 Novembre 2025 ‡ National team caps and goals as of 2 December 2011

Jugurtha Hamroun (Arabic: يوغرطة حمرون; Tamazight: ⵊⵓⴳⵓⵔⵜⴰ ⵀⴰⵎⵔⵓⵏ; born 27 January 1989) is an Algerian professional footballer who plays as a winger.

After starting out at Guingamp in France, he went on to compete professionally in Bulgaria, Turkey, Romania, Qatar and Algeria.

Hamroun represented Algeria at under-23 level, making his debut in November 2011.

== Personal life ==
Hamroun was born in the town of Bouzeguene in the Tizi Ouzou Province, Kabylia. At age 5, he moved with his family to France, where they settled in Neuilly-sur-Marne in the eastern suburbs of Paris. He acquired French nationality by naturalization on 4 June 2008. He his the cousin of footballer Rezki Hamroune.

== Club career ==
=== Guingamp ===
At age 12, Hamroun joined the youth ranks of French club En Avant de Guingamp. On 8 April 2008, he signed his first professional contract, for a period of three years, and on 29 August of that year he made his Ligue 2 debut, coming as a substitute for Cédric Liabeuf in the 83rd minute of a 1–1 home draw against CS Sedan Ardennes.

During his three-year spell at the Stade du Roudourou, Hamroun alternated between the first team and the reserves, going on to appear in 26 competitive games for the former, including twice in the 2009–10 UEFA Europa League.

=== Chernomorets Burgas ===
On 26 July 2011, Hamroun signed a three-year deal with Bulgarian team Chernomorets Burgas, joining on a free transfer. He scored in his A PFG debut, helping to a 2–0 home win over Lokomotiv Plovdiv on 20 August.

=== Karabükspor ===
On 18 January 2012, however, Hamroun moved clubs and countries again, being sold to Kardemir Karabükspor in the Turkish Süper Lig for a reported fee of €600,000. He played his first match three days later, starting and featuring 70 minutes in the 2–1 home success over Trabzonspor.

In his first full season, Hamroun contributed with 20 scoreless appearances as the side narrowly avoided relegation after ranking 15th.

=== Oțelul Galați ===
In January 2015, after being a free agent since the summer, Hamroun signed a six-month contract with Romania's Oțelul Galați, who were in the midst of a financial crisis. The second of his Liga I goals came on 19 April in a 2–1 win at eventual champions Steaua București, but his team was not able to eventually stave off relegation.

=== FCSB ===
After Oțelul's relegation into Liga II, Hamroun refused to extend his contract and, as it was due to expire, fellow league side Petrolul Ploiești showed interest in signing the player. On 29 June 2015, he was announced as player of Giresunspor on their official website, but the deal eventually fell through due to the club being in debt and not allowed to make any transfers; in July, he joined FCSB on a three-year deal, making his debut on the 14th against AS Trenčín in the first leg of the second qualifying round for the UEFA Champions League and scoring the second goal of the 2–0 away win.

=== Samsunspor ===
In January 2021, Hamroun became part of the Samsunspor team.

=== JS Kabylie ===
On 5 February 2024, he joined JS Kabylie.

== International career ==
On 22 December 2009, Hamroun was called up to the Algerian under-23 national team by head coach Abdelhak Bencheikha, for a week-long training camp in Algiers. In October 2011, after scoring four goals in eight games in the Bulgarian League, he was recalled by new manager Azzedine Aït Djoudi after an almost two-year absence.

On 15 November 2011, Hamroun made his debut for the under-23s, as a second-half substitute in a friendly against South Africa. The following day, he was selected for the squad due to appear at the Africa U-23 Cup of Nations in Morocco.

== Career statistics ==
=== Club ===
As of match played 15 May 2023

Appearances and goals by club, season and competition
Club	Season	League			National cup (Note: Includes Coupe de France, Turkish Cup, Bulgarian Cup and Cupa României)		League cup (Note: Includes Coupe de la Ligue and Cupa Ligii)		Continental (Note: Includes UEFA Champions League and UEFA Europa League)		Other		Total	
Club	Season	Division	Apps	Goals	Apps	Goals	Apps	Goals	Apps	Goals	Apps	Goals	Apps	Goals
Guingamp B	2008–09						–		–		–			
Guingamp B	2009–10						–		–		–			
Guingamp B	2010–11						–		–		–			
Guingamp B	Total		40	8	0	0	0	0	–		–		40	8
Guingamp	2008–09	Ligue 2	2	0	0	0	0	0	–		–		2	0
Guingamp	2009–10	Ligue 2	16	0	2	0	2	0	2 (Note: Appearance(s) in UEFA Europa League)	0	–		22	0
Guingamp	2010–11	Championnat National	3	0	0	0	1	2	–		–		4	2
Guingamp	Total		21	0	2	0	3	2	2	0	–		28	2
Chernomorets	2011–12	A Group	14	6	0	0	–		–		–		14	6
Karabükspor	2011–12	Süper Lig	8	0	3	0	–		–		–		11	0
Karabükspor	2012–13	Süper Lig	20	0	4	1	–		–		–		24	1
Karabükspor	2013–14	Süper Lig	13	1	2	1	–		–		–		15	2
Karabükspor	Total		41	1	9	2	–		–		–		50	3
Oțelul Galați	2014–15	Liga I	11	4	–		–		–		–		11	4
FCSB	2015–16	Liga I	26	7	4	0	1	1	5 (Note: Four appearances and two goals in UEFA Champions League, one appearance in UEFA Europa League)	2	–		36	10
FCSB	2016–17	Liga I	5	1	0	0	0	0	3 (Note: Appearance(s) in UEFA Champions League)	0	–		8	1
FCSB	Total		31	8	4	0	1	1	8	2	–		44	11
Al Sadd (loan)	2016–17	Qatar Stars League	20	6	5	4	–		1 (Note: Appearance(s) in AFC Champions League)	0	–		26	10
Al Sadd	2017–18	Qatar Stars League	19	12	1	0	–		6	1	1 (Note: Appearance in Qatari Super Cup)	1	27	14
Al Kharaitiyat (loan)	2018–19	Qatar Stars League	12	1	0	0	–		–		–		12	1
Qatar (loan)	2018–19	Qatar Stars League	6	0	0	0	–		–		1 (Note: Appearance in League Play-off)	0	7	0
Erzurumspor F.K.	2019–20	TFF First League	25	7	0	0	–		–		–		25	7
Erzurumspor F.K.	2020–21	Süper Lig	7	0	0	0	–		–		–		7	0
Erzurumspor F.K.	Total		32	7	0	0	–		–		–		32	7
Samsunspor	2020–21	TFF First League	14	2	0	0	–		–		–		14	2
Al-Markhiya	2021–22	Qatari Second Division	11	6	2	2	–		–		3 (Note: Appearance in Qatari Federation Cup)	2	16	10
Al-Markhiya	2022–23	Qatar Stars League	7	1	1	0	–		–		0 (Note: Appearance in Qatari Super Cup)	0	8	1
Al-Khor	2022–23	Qatari Second Division	9	5	0	0	–		–		1 (Note: Appearance in League Play-off)	1	10	6
Career total			288	67	24	8	4	3	17	3	6	4	341	85

== Honours ==
Guingamp

- Coupe de France: 2008–09
- Trophée des Champions runner-up: 2009

FCSB

- Cupa Ligii: 2015–16

Al Sadd SC

- Qatar Crown Prince Cup: 2017
- Emir of Qatar Cup: 2017
- Qatari Super Cup: 2017
- Qatar Crown Prince Cup runner-up: 2018

Al-Markhiya SC

- Qatari Second Division: 2021–22
