= Jasser Yahya =

Qatari footballer (born 1992)

Personal information
- Full name: Jasser Yahya Zakaria Madany
- Date of birth: 19 December 1992 (age 33)
- Place of birth: Qatar
- Height: 1.78 m (5 ft 10 in)
- Position: Midfielder

Team information
- Current team: Al-Khor
- Number: 27

Youth career
- Al-Sadd

Senior career*
Years	Team	Apps	(Gls)
2012–2017	Al-Sadd	29	(1)
2017–2021	Al-Arabi	52	(3)
2019–2020	→ Umm Salal (loan)	10	(0)
2021–2023	Al-Khor	21	(0)
2023	Muaither	0	(0)
2023–	Al-Khor	10	(1)
- * Club domestic league appearances and goals

Jasser Yahya (Arabic:جاسر يحيى) (born 19 December 1992) is a Qatari footballer. He currently plays for Al-Khor as a midfielder.
