= Hamza Sanhaji =

Qatari footballer (born 1994)

Personal information
- Date of birth: 22 April 1994 (age 32)
- Place of birth: Casablanca, Morocco
- Height: 1.80 m (5 ft 11 in)
- Position: Forward

Team information
- Current team: Al-Markhiya
- Number: 77

Youth career
- 1998-2011: Wydad Athletic Club

Senior career*
Years	Team	Apps	(Gls)
2011–2020	Al-Sadd	69	(37)
2016–2017	→ El Jaish (loan)	14	(1)
2017–2018	→ Eupen (loan)	5	(0)
2018–2018	→ DHJ (loan)		
2018–2020	→ Al-Markhiya (loan)		
2020–2021	Mouloudia Oujda	2	(0)
2021–2021	Al-Ahli	12	(5)
2021–2022	Al-Zawraa		
2022	SCC Mohammédia	14	(3)
2022–2023	Masafi		
2023–2024	Bahrain		
2025	Al-Malkiya		
2025–	Al-Markhiya		

International career
2015–2017	Qatar U23	7	(2)
- * Club domestic league appearances and goals

Hamza Sanhaji (Arabic:حمزة الصنهاجي; born 22 April 1994) is a professional footballer who plays for Al-Markhiya as a forward. Born in Morocco, he has represented Qatar at youth level.

== International career ==
Sanhaji was born in Morocco, but moved to Qatar at a young age. Sanhaji represented the Qatar U23s at the 2015 WAFF U-23 Championship. He scored two goals in 4 appearances at the tournament.

== Career statistics ==
=== Club ===
As of match played 5 August 2017

Club	Season	League			National Cup		Continental		Other		Total			
Club	Season	Division	Apps	Goals	Apps	Goals	Apps	Goals	Apps	Goals	Apps	Goals		
Al Sadd	2012–13	Qatar Stars League	1	11	5	1	0	0	0	12	5	5		
Al Sadd	Al Sadd	Qatar Stars League	2013–14	Qatar Stars League	14	0	7	1	0	0	0	0	14	7
Al Sadd	Al Sadd	Qatar Stars League	2014–15	Qatar Stars League	15	3	8	0	2 (Note: Appearances in the Asian Champions League)	0	0	0	15	8
Al Sadd	Al Sadd	Qatar Stars League	2015–16	Qatar Stars League	12	3	7	0	1	2	0	0	12	7
Al Sadd	Al Sadd	Qatar Stars League	2016–17	Qatar Stars League	14	9	0	0	0	0	0	0	14	9
Al Sadd SC	Al Sadd	46	13	4	1	3	2	0	0	53	16			
El Jaish (loan)	2016–17	Qatar Stars League	9	1	0	0	4	0	0	0	13	1		
Eupen (loan)	2017–18	Belgian First Division A	0	5	0	0	~	~	0	0	5	0		
Career total			55	14	4	1	7	2	0	0	70	17		
