= 2017 Qatar Cup =

Tournament details
- Country: Qatar
- Dates: April 20–29
- Teams: 4

Final positions
- Champions: Al Sadd SC (6th title)
- Runners-up: El Jaish SC

Tournament statistics
- Matches played: 3
- Goals scored: 13 (4.33 per match)
- Top goal scorer(s): (Algeria) Jugurtha Hamroun (3 goals)

The 2017 Qatar Cup, more widely known as the Crown Prince Cup, was the twenty-third edition of the Qatar Cup. It was played from April 26–29. The cup is contested by the top four finishers of the 2016–17 Qatar Stars League.

== Participants ==
Team	2016–17 League Position
Al-Duhail SC	Champions
Al Sadd SC	Runners-up
Al-Rayyan SC	Third
El Jaish SC	Fourth

== Matches ==
=== Semi-finals ===
20 April 2017
17:00 AST

Al-Sadd SC	3–2	Al-Rayyan SC
Jugurtha Hamroun 1'; Hassan Al-Haydos 21'; Jugurtha Hamroun 23'	Report	Koh Myong-jin 54'; Sergio García 74'

Jassim bin Hamad Stadium, Doha
21 April 2017
17:00 AST

Al-Duhail SC	2–3	El Jaish SC
Ismaeel Mohammad 51'; Edgar Silva 77'	Report	Seydou Keita 24'; Romarinho 49'; Sardor Rashidov 90'

Jassim bin Hamad Stadium, Doha

== Finals ==
29 April 2017
17:00 AST

Al Sadd SC	2–1	El Jaish SC
Baghdad Bounedjah 21'; Jugurtha Hamroun 73'	Report	Sardor Rashidov 38'

Jassim bin Hamad Stadium, Doha

== Bracket ==
Semi-finals
2017–04–20 – Doha
Al Sadd SC	3
Al-Rayyan SC	2
2021–04–21 – Doha
Al-Duhail SC	2
El Jaish SC	3

Final
2021–04–29 – Doha
Al Sadd SC	2
El Jaish SC	1

== Top scorers ==
Rank	Player	Club	Goals
1	(Algeria) Jugurtha Hamroun	Al Sadd SC	3
2	(Uzbekistan) Sardor Rashidov	El Jaish SC	2
3	(Spain) Sergio García	Al-Rayyan SC	1
3	(South Korea) Koh Myong-jin	Al-Rayyan SC	1
3	(Qatar) Hassan Al-Haydos	Al-Sadd SC	1
3	(Mali) Seydou Keita	El Jaish SC	1
3	(Qatar) Ismaeel Mohammad	Al-Duhail SC	1
3	(Brazil) Romarinho	El Jaish SC	1
3	(Brazil) Edgar Silva	Al-Duhail SC	1
3	(Algeria) Baghdad Bounedjah	Al Sadd SC	1
