= Ibrahim Majid =

Qatari footballer (born 1990)

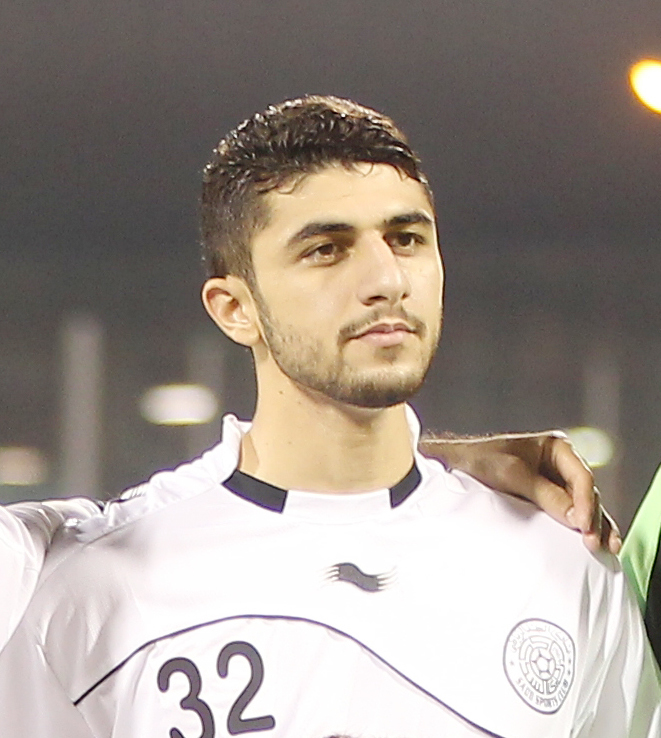
- Majid in an Al Sadd line-up in 2012

Personal information
- Full name: Ibrahim Majid Abdullmajid
- Date of birth: May 12, 1990 (age 36)
- Place of birth: Kuwait City, Kuwait
- Height: 1.83 m (6 ft 0 in)
- Position: Centre back

Team information
- Current team: Al-Shamal
- Number: 32

Youth career
- 1996–2006: Al Wakrah
- 2006–2007: Al Sadd

Senior career*
Years	Team	Apps	(Gls)
2007–2020	Al Sadd	83	(10)
2019	→ Al-Arabi (loan)	4	(0)
2019-2020	→ Al-Sailiya (loan)	0	(0)
2020–2022	Al Ahli	35	(2)
2022–2025	Qatar SC	52	(0)
2025–	Al-Shamal	0	(0)

International career^{‡}
2007–2017	Qatar	89	(6)
- * Club domestic league appearances and goals as of 29 December 2014 ‡ National team caps and goals as of 14 February 2018

Ibrahim Majid Abdullmajid (Arabic: إبراهيم ماجد عبد المجيد; born on May 12, 1990) is a footballer who plays as a central defender for Al-Shamal. Born in Kuwait, he represented the Qatar national team.

== Career ==
He used to be a striker when he played for Al Wakrah, then his coach in Al Sadd's youth team saw that he has the ability and the strength of a central defender. He made his senior team debut for Al Sadd in 2007 against Al-Karamah SC.

Majid scored one of the winning penalties in the 2011 AFC Champions League final against Jeonbuk to help Al Sadd secure the continental title for the second time in its history. He also scored against Kashiwa Reysol in the penalty shoot-out during the third-place match of the 2011 FIFA Club World Cup.

== International goals ==
Last update: 13 November 2014.

#	Date	Venue	Opponent	Score	Result	Competition
1.	30 August 2008	King Fahd International Stadium, Riyadh, Saudi Arabia	Saudi Arabia	1–0	1–2	Friendly
2.	26 May 2009	Jassim Bin Hamad Stadium, Doha, Qatar	Saudi Arabia	2–1	2–1	Friendly
3.	31 May 2009	Jassim Bin Hamad Stadium, Doha, Qatar	Iraq	1–0	1–0	Friendly
4.	7 March 2013	Thani bin Jassim Stadium, Doha, Qatar	Egypt	2–1	3–1	Friendly
5.	24 May 2013	Jassim Bin Hamad Stadium, Doha, Qatar	Latvia	1–1	3–1	Friendly
6.	13 November 2014	King Fahd International Stadium, Riyadh, Saudi Arabia	Saudi Arabia	1–1	1–1	22nd Arabian Gulf Cup
