= Mohammed Kasola =

Qatari footballer (born 1985)

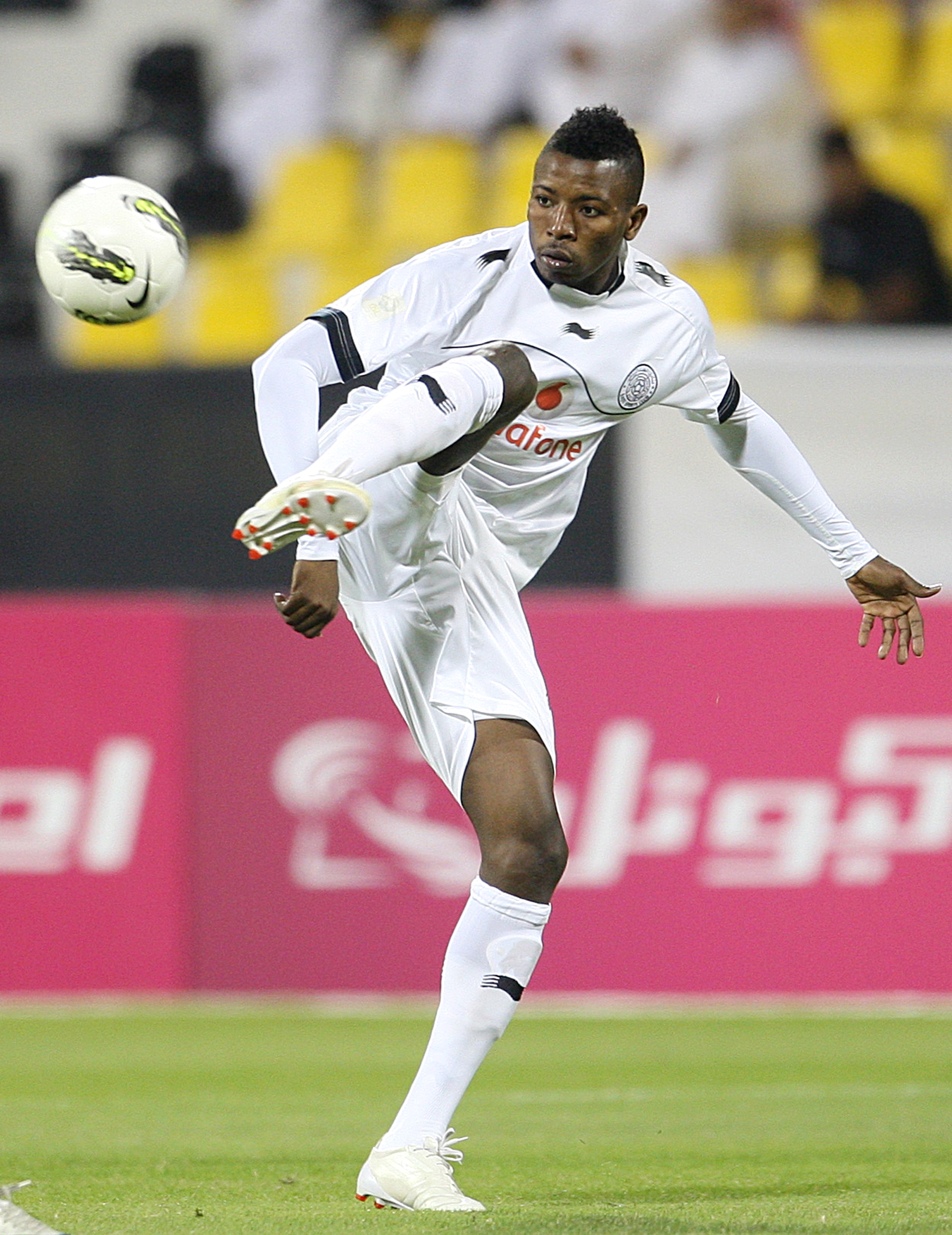
- Kasola with Al Sadd in 2011

Personal information
- Full name: Mohammed Kasola
- Date of birth: August 13, 1985 (age 41)
- Place of birth: Greater Accra, Ghana
- Height: 1.81 m (5 ft 11 in)
- Position: Centre back

Senior career*
Years	Team	Apps	(Gls)
2005–2009	Mesaimeer	?	(?)
2009–2010	Al-Khor	23	(1)
2010–2018	Al Sadd	125	(10)
2017–2018	→ Al-Rayyan (loan)	9	(0)
2018–2020	Umm Salal	23	(0)
2020–2021	Mesaimeer	18	(1)

International career
2010–2017	Qatar	64	(7)
- * Club domestic league appearances and goals

Mohammed Kasola (Arabic: محمد كاسولا; born on August 13, 1985) is a former football player who played as a centre back. Born in Ghana, he represented the Qatar national team.

== Club career statistics ==
Statistics accurate as of 21 August 2011

Club	Season	League	League		Cup^{1}		League Cup^{2}		Continental^{3}		Total	
Club	Season	League	Apps	Goals	Apps	Goals	Apps	Goals	Apps	Goals	Apps	Goals
Al-Khor	2008–09	QSL	11	0								
Al-Khor	2009–10	QSL	12	1								
Al-Khor	Total		23	1								
Al-Sadd	2009–10	QSL	6	0								
Al-Sadd	2010–11	QSL	19	0								
Al-Sadd	2011-12	QSL										
Al-Sadd	Total		25	0								
Career total			48	1								

^{1}Includes Emir of Qatar Cup.

^{2}Includes Sheikh Jassem Cup.

^{3}Includes AFC Champions League.

== International career ==
He has made his first appearance for the senior Qatar national football team in a friendly match against Slovenia on March 3, 2010. He scored his first goal in a friendly against Russia in the 4th minute, and also gave his team an early lead in the 6th minute against Vietnam.

Kasola gained nationwide eminence for scoring a late equalizer in the 86th minute against Iran in the third round of the 2014 World Cup qualifiers. Qatar, entering the match with a 9-goal advantage over Bahrain, who were 3 points behind them, were trailing 2–1 in the second half of the match held in Iran. Meanwhile, Bahrain, who were beating Indonesia 10–0 in a home match in very controversial circumstances, looked to go through to the next round until Kasola's goal saved Qatar from elimination. Similarly, there was some controversy over Kasola's goal, but it was not pursued by FIFA. As a reward for scoring the goal, Kasola received an Arabian camel.

=== International goals ===
Scores and results list Qatar's goal tally first.

No	Date	Venue	Opponent	Score	Result	Competition
1.	29 March 2011	Jassim Bin Hamad Stadium, Doha, Qatar	Russia	1–0	1–1	Friendly
2.	23 July 2011	Jassim Bin Hamad Stadium, Doha, Qatar	Vietnam	1–0	3–0	2014 FIFA World Cup qualification
3.	29 February 2012	Azadi Stadium, Tehran, Iran	Iran	2–2	2–2	2014 FIFA World Cup qualification
4.	17 April 2013	Jassim Bin Hamad Stadium, Doha, Qatar	Palestine	1–0	2–0	Friendly
5.	15 November 2013	Sheikh Khalifa International Stadium, Doha, Qatar	Yemen	3–1	4–1	2015 AFC Asian Cup qualification
6.	3 September 2015	Jassim Bin Hamad Stadium, Doha, Qatar	Bhutan	2–0	15–0	2018 FIFA World Cup qualification
7.	13 October 2015	Jassim Bin Hamad Stadium, Doha, Qatar	Maldives	2–0	4–0	2018 FIFA World Cup qualification
