= 2023–24 Al Sadd SC season =

Al Sadd SC
2023–24 season
- Chairman: Muhammed bin Khalifa Al Thani
- Head coach: Bruno Pinheiro (from 13 July 2023) (until 16 November 2023); Wesam Rizik (from 25 November 2023)
- Stadium: Jassim Bin Hamad Stadium
- Qatar Stars League: 1st
- Emir of Qatar Cup: Winners
- Champions League: Group stage
- Arab Club Champions Cup: Quarter-finals
- Top goalscorer: League: Akram Afif (26); All: Akram Afif (30)
Home colours	Away colours	Third colours

In the 2023–24 season, Al Sadd SC is competing in the Qatar Stars League for the 51st season, as well as the Emir of Qatar Cup, the Champions League and the Arab Club Champions Cup.

== Review ==
=== Background ===
Al Sadd SC began training in the external camp on the first of July in the Seefeld in Tirol region in Austria, which will continue until the fifteenth of the same month, during which the team will play 3 friendly matches. The team's technical staff, led by Spaniard Juan Manuel Lillo, tried to give the largest number of players the opportunity to measure their response to the work they have undergone since starting their preparations in Doha before traveling to Austria in preparation for the new season. It is worth noting that Al Sadd SC has succeeded in strengthening its ranks with a number of foreign professional players led by The Brazilian duo Paulo Otávio coming from VfL Wolfsburg and Giovanni Henrique coming from Palmeiras for a fee reported to be around €9 million. It also signed Colombian midfielder Mateus Uribe from Porto and Iranian defender Amin Hazbavi player of Iranian Foolad. Al Sadd SC had renewed the contract of Brazilian Guilherme Torres for the next two seasons, until 2025 and kept Baghdad Bounedjah in the team during the current season.

On July 13, 2023, Al Sadd have announced the appointment of Portuguese Bruno Pinheiro as the coach of their first team succeeding Spaniard ‘Juanma’, who desired to be relieved due to urgent personal circumstances and which was approved by the club management. On July 24, 2023, Al Sadd signed Ecuadorian international Gonzalo Plata for five seasons coming from Valladolid. On the same day Moroccan defender Romain Saïss joined the club for two seasons in a deal amounting to 2.5 million euros, coming from Beşiktaş. However, due to exceeding the number of foreign players allowed in the Qatar Stars League, the club loaned its player to Al-Shabab for one season.

== Squad list ==
Players and squad numbers last updated on 4 May 2023.
Note: Flags indicate national team as has been defined under FIFA eligibility rules. Players may hold more than one non-FIFA nationality.

No.	Nat.	Position	Name	Date of birth (age)	Signed from
Goalkeepers
1	(Qatar)	GK	Saad Al Sheeb	19 February 1990 (aged 33)	(Qatar) Youth system
22	(Qatar)	GK	Meshaal Barsham	14 February 1998 (aged 25)	(Qatar) Youth system
30	(Qatar)	GK	Jehad Hudib	14 October 2000 (aged 22)	(Qatar) Youth system
31	(Qatar)	GK	Yousef Baliadeh	30 October 2002 (aged 20)	(Qatar) Al-Shamal SC
99	(Qatar)	GK	Abdulla Ibrahim		(Qatar) Youth system
Defenders
2	(Qatar)	CB	Pedro Miguel	6 August 1990 (aged 33)	(Qatar) Al Ahli
5	(Qatar)	CB	Tarek Salman	5 December 1997 (aged 25)	(Spain) Júpiter Leonés
6	(Brazil)	LB	Paulo Otávio	23 November 1994 (aged 28)	(Germany) VfL Wolfsburg
13	(Qatar)	RB	Abdullah Al-Yazidi	28 March 2002 (aged 21)	(Qatar) Youth system
16	(Qatar)	LB / CB	Boualem Khoukhi	7 September 1990 (aged 32)	(Qatar) Al Arabi
37	(Qatar)	CB	Ahmed Suhail	8 February 1999 (aged 24)	(Qatar) Youth system
55	(Iran)	CB	Amin Hazbavi	6 May 2003 (aged 20)	(Iran) Foolad
66	(Qatar)	CB	Abdulrahman Al-Ameen	9 March 2004 (aged 19)	(Qatar) Youth system
70	(Qatar)	RB	Musab Kheder	1 January 1993 (aged 30)	(Qatar) Youth system
98	(Qatar)	LB	Nayef Hamid	9 June 2004 (aged 19)	(Qatar) Youth system
Midfielders
4	(Qatar)	DM	Ahmed Sayyar	6 October 1993 (aged 29)	(Qatar) Al-Gharafa
7	(Qatar)	CM / DM / AM	Mohammed Waad	18 September 1999 (aged 23)	(Qatar) Youth system
8	(Qatar)	CM	Ali Assadalla	19 January 1993 (aged 30)	(Bahrain) Al Muharraq
14	(Qatar)	CM	Mostafa Meshaal	28 March 2001 (aged 22)	(Qatar) Youth system
18	(Brazil)	DM	Guilherme Torres	5 April 1991 (aged 32)	(Greece) Olympiacos
20	(Qatar)	DM	Salem Al-Hajri	10 April 1996 (aged 27)	(Belgium) Eupen
33	(Qatar)	CM	Moaz El-Wadia	6 November 2004 (aged 18)	(Qatar) Youth system
86	(Qatar)		Mohamed Faragalla		(Qatar) Youth system
88	(Colombia)	CM / DM	Mateus Uribe	21 March 1991 (aged 32)	(Portugal) Porto
96	(Qatar)	CM	Anas Abweny	11 September 2004 (aged 18)	(Qatar) Al-Shamal SC
97	(Qatar)		Abdulla Mahdi	29 October 2003 (aged 19)	(Qatar) Youth system
Forwards
9	(Qatar)	CF	Yusuf Abdurisag	6 August 1999 (aged 24)	(Qatar) Youth system
10	(Qatar)	RW / LW / AM	Hassan Al-Haidos	11 December 1990 (aged 32)	(Qatar) Youth system
11	(Algeria)	ST	Baghdad Bounedjah	24 November 1991 (aged 31)	(Tunisia) Étoile du Sahel
12	(Morocco)	CF	Ilyes Housni	14 May 2005 (aged 18)	(France) Paris Saint-Germain
17	(Brazil)		Giovanni Henrique	1 January 2004 (aged 19)	(Brazil) Palmeiras
19	(Ecuador)	RW	Gonzalo Plata	1 November 2000 (aged 22)	(Spain) Valladolid
23	(Qatar)	RW	Hashim Ali	17 August 2000 (aged 23)	(Qatar) Al-Rayyan (Loan return)
25	(Qatar)	RW	Mohammed Al-Quraishi	24 February 2004 (aged 19)	(Qatar) Youth system
28	(Qatar)	LW	Ahmad Al-Saeed	29 March 2003 (aged 20)	(Qatar) Youth system
51	(Qatar)	LW / RW	Akram Afif	18 November 1996 (aged 26)	(Spain) Villarreal

== Pre-season and friendlies ==
5 July 2023 Friendly	Al Sadd SC (Qatar)	4–0	(Austria) SVG Reichenau	Seefeld in Tirol, Austria
18:00 UTC+2		Report

9 July 2023 Friendly	Al Sadd SC (Qatar)	1–3	(Azerbaijan) Sabah FC	Seefeld in Tirol, Austria
15:00 UTC+2	Akram Afif 64' (pen.)	Report	Ələsgərov 4'; Irazabal 30'; Apeh 67' (pen.)

14 July 2023 Friendly	Al-Shabab (Saudi Arabia)	3–1	(Qatar) Al Sadd SC	Wörgl, Austria
18:00 CEST	Bahebri 28'; Abdu 38'; Al-Ammar 88'	Report	Bounedjah 90+2'	Stadium: Centro Sportivo di Wörgl

21 July 2023 Friendly	Al Sadd SC (Qatar)	2–2	(Morocco) Raja CA	Doha
17:30 UTC+3	Al-Haidos 28'; Bounedjah 32'	Report	Khafifi 53'; Bouzok 68'	Stadium: Jassim bin Hamad Stadium

== Competitions ==
=== Overview ===
Competition	Record								Started round	Final position / round	First match	Last match
Competition	G	W	D	L	GF	GA	GD	Win %	Started round	Final position / round	First match	Last match
Qatar Stars League	22	15	4	3	65	21	+44	68.18	Matchday 1	Winner	18 August 2023	28 April 2024
Emir of Qatar Cup	4	4	0	0	6	2	+4	100.00	Round of 16	Winner	9 May 2024	24 May 2024
Champions League	6	2	2	2	11	7	+4	33.33	Group stage		18 September 2023	4 December 2023
Arab Club Champions Cup	4	2	1	1	6	6	+0	50.00	Group stage	Quarter-finals	27 July 2023	5 August 2023
Total	36	23	7	6	88	36	+52	63.89				

Updated to match played 24 May 2024
Source: Competitions

=== Qatar Stars League ===
==== League table ====
Pos	Team	Pld	W	D	L	GF	GA	GD	Pts	Qualification or relegation
1	Al-Sadd (C)	22	15	4	3	65	21	+44	49	Qualification for the AFC Champions League Elite League stage
2	Al-Rayyan	22	15	2	5	50	26	+24	47	Qualification for the AFC Champions League Elite League stage
3	Al-Gharafa	22	13	5	4	53	36	+17	44	Qualification for the AFC Champions League Elite play-off round
4	Al-Wakrah	22	11	5	6	40	30	+10	38	Qualification for the AFC Champions League Two group stage
5	Al-Arabi	22	7	8	7	42	38	+4	29	Qualification for the AGCFF Gulf Club Champions League group stage

Source: QSL, Soccerway
Rules for classification: 1) Points; 2) Goal difference; 3) Number of goals scored;
(C) Champions

==== Results summary ====
Overall								Home						Away					
Pld	W	D	L	GF	GA	GD	Pts	W	D	L	GF	GA	GD	W	D	L	GF	GA	GD
22	15	4	3	65	21	+44	49	9	1	1	37	6	+31	6	3	2	28	15	+13

Last updated: 28 April 2024.
Source: Competitive matches

==== Results by round ====
Round	1	2	3	4	5	6	7	8	9	10	11	12	13	14	15	16	17	18	19	20	21	22
Ground	A	H	H	A	H	H	A	H	H	H	H	H	A	A	H	A	A	H	A	A	A	A
Result	W	W	D	W	W	L	W	W	W	W	W	W	W	D	W	D	D	W	W	L	W	L
Position	2	1	4	3	1	3	2	2	1	1	1	1	1	1	1	1	1	1	1	1	1	1

Updated to match(es) played on 28 October 2023. Source: Competitive matches
A = Away; H = Home; W = Win; D = Draw; L = Loss

==== Matches ====
Win Draw Loss

18 August 2023 Round 1	Umm Salal	1–3	Al Sadd	Al Khor
20:30	Barimil (yellow card) 16'; Louadni (yellow card) 65'; Delort 86'	Report	Akram Afif 5'; Guilherme 26'; Abdurisag 48'	Stadium: Al Bayt Stadium; Referee: Abdulrahman Al-Jassim

26 August 2023 Round 2	Al Sadd	4–2	Al-Ahli	Doha
20:30	Hazbavi 7'; Akram Afif 26'; Guilherme (yellow card) 41'; Abdurisag 62'; Salman (yellow card) 67'; Suhail (red card) 74'; Plata 78'; Hashim Ali (yellow card) 90+7'	Report	Bayoumi (yellow card) 11'; Islam Yassine (yellow card) 64'; Sliti 76' (pen.), 82' (pen.)	Stadium: Khalifa International Stadium; Referee: Abdulhadi Al Ruaile

2 September 2023 Round 3	Al Sadd	0–0	Al-Wakrah	Doha
20:15	Uribe (yellow card) 45+3'; Hazbavi (yellow card) 45+8'; Otávio (yellow card) 56'; Khoukhi (yellow card) 84'	Report	Assal (yellow card) 29'; Hamdy Fathy (yellow card) 33'; Shehata (yellow card) 51'; Maqsoud (yellow card) 80'	Stadium: Khalifa International Stadium; Referee: Mohammed Al-Shammari

23 September 2023 Round 4	Qatar SC	1–3	Al Sadd	Doha
20:00	Malango 20' (yellow card) 90+3'; Benoun (yellow card) 58'; Palangi (yellow card) 63'; Bujaloof (yellow card) 88'	Report	Plata 16'; Akram Afif 64' (pen.); Paulo Otávio 81'	Stadium: Khalifa International Stadium; Referee: Abdulhadi Al Ruaile

28 September 2023 Round 5	Al Sadd	4–0	Al-Gharafa	Doha
18:00	Akram Afif 27' (pen.) (yellow card) 33'; Al-Haydos 30' (yellow card) 34'; Abdurisag (yellow card) 48'; Assadalla 54', 60'; Hazbavi (yellow card) 90+2'	Report	Boulaya (yellow card) 56'; Brahimi (yellow card) 64'; Lyanco (yellow card) 25' (yellow-red card) 90'	Stadium: Khalifa International Stadium; Referee: Abdulrahman Al-Jassim

28 October 2023 Round 7	Muaither	0–2	Al Sadd	Doha
19:30	Syahputra (yellow card) 30'; Hamed (yellow card) 79'; Alibec (yellow card) 89'; Salah (yellow card) 90+5'	Report	Akram Afif 42' (pen.); Kheder (yellow card) 90+2'; Hashim Ali 90+4'	Stadium: Hamad bin Khalifa Stadium; Referee: Mohammed Al-Sherif

2 November 2023 Round 8	Al Sadd	5–0	Al-Markhiya	Doha
16:30	Bounedjah 12'; Akram Afif 16', 20', 42', 45+2' (yellow card) 36'; Sayyar (yellow card) 49'	Report	Lallam (yellow card) 58'; Njie (yellow card) 70'	Stadium: Jassim bin Hamad Stadium; Referee: Khalid Nabet

1 December 2023 Round 10	Al Sadd	4–0	Al-Shamal	Doha
19:30	Plata 39', 62'; Hazbavi (yellow card) 45+4'; Akram Afif 58' (pen.); Bounedjah 86'	Report	Al-Hashemi (red card) 52'	Stadium: Jassim bin Hamad Stadium; Referee: Meshari Al Shammari

9 December 2023 Round 11	Al Sadd	4–0	Al-Rayyan	Doha
19:30	Bounedjah (yellow card) 39' (goal) 46', 75', 83'; Plata 52'; Uribe (yellow card) 66'	Report	Rodrigo (red card) 9'; Al-Rawi (yellow card) 39'; Róger Guedes (yellow card) 71'	Stadium: Jassim bin Hamad Stadium; Referee: Abdulhadi Al Ruaile

13 December 2023 Round 9	Al Sadd	3–1	Al-Duhail	Doha
19:30	Pedro Miguel (yellow card) 21'; Akram Afif 57' (pen.), 90+13'; Plata 59'; Meshaal (yellow card) 87'; Uribe (yellow card) 90+2'	Report	Boudiaf 10'; Madibo (yellow card) 32'; Muntari (yellow card) 45+3'; Musa (yellow card) 58'; Bamba (red card) 81'	Stadium: Jassim bin Hamad Stadium; Referee: Salman Ahmad Falahi

17 December 2023 Round 6	Al Sadd	0–1	Al-Arabi	Doha
19:30	Uribe (yellow card) 45+4'; Waad (yellow card) 70'; Otávio (yellow card) 90+3'; Hazbavi (yellow card) 90+9'	Report	Rafinha 31'; Verratti (yellow card) 34'; Marafee (yellow card) 76'; Kala (yellow card) 90+7'	Stadium: Jassim bin Hamad Stadium; Referee: Abdulrahman Al-Jassim

21 December 2023 Round 12	Al Sadd	6–0	Umm Salal	Doha
19:30	Plata 10'; Al-Haydos 14', 49' (yellow card) 78'; Akram Afif 18'; Laidouni 43' (o.g.); Guilherme 69'	Report	Raafat (yellow card) 90'	Stadium: Jassim bin Hamad Stadium; Referee: Moatasem Al Mazyed

25 February 2024 Round 14	Al-Wakrah	0–0	Al Sadd	Al Wakrah
17:00	Sainsbury (yellow card) 38'; Nabil Irfan (yellow card) 46'; Omar Al Osad (yellow card) 60'; Boussafi (yellow card) 71'; Al Khater (red card) 76'	Report	Waad (yellow card) 63'; Akram Afif (yellow card) 90+6'	Stadium: Al Janoub Stadium; Referee: Abdulrahman Al Jassim

1 March 2024 Round 15	Al Sadd	3–0	Qatar SC	Doha
17:00	Akram Afif 34', 44' (pen.), 45+9' (pen.)	Report	Al-Ahrak (yellow card) 33'; Youssef Mohammed (yellow card) 64'	Stadium: Jassim bin Hamad Stadium; Referee: Salman Ahmad Falahi

6 March 2024 Round 16	Al-Gharafa	2–2	Al Sadd	Al Rayyan
19:00	Abdalla Sirelkhatim (yellow card) 45+4'; Sassi 71'; Khoukhi 82' (o.g.)	Report	Sano 45+1' (o.g.); Abdurisag 80'; Guilherme (yellow card) 20'; Waad (yellow card) 75'; Assadalla (yellow card) 86'	Stadium: Thani bin Jassim Stadium; Referee: Hamad Al Subaie

10 March 2024 Round 17	Al-Arabi	2–2	Al Sadd	Doha
19:30	Helal Mohammed (yellow card) 45+7'; Al-Sulaiti (yellow card) 29'; Rafinha 38' (yellow card) 51'; Al Somah 90+9'; Verratti (yellow card) 90+11'	Report	Akram Afif 18', 20'; Kheder (yellow card) 89'	Stadium: Al Thumama Stadium; Referee: Abdulhadi Al Ruaile

15 March 2024 Round 18	Al Sadd	4–2	Muaither	Doha
20:30	Hazbavi (yellow card) 37'; Salman 48'; Akram Afif 73' (pen.), 77' (pen.), 90+8'	Report	El Hassouni 39' (pen.); Alibec (yellow card) 43'; Tiago 45'; Hugo Gomes (yellow card) 74'	Stadium: Jassim bin Hamad Stadium; Referee: Mohammed Nasser Ahmed

31 March 2024 Round 19	Al-Markhiya	1–2	Al Sadd	Doha
21:30	Abdulnaser (yellow card) 24'; Otávio 26' (o.g.); Al-Shila (yellow card) 56'; Lallam (yellow card) 70'; Oumar Barry (yellow card) 88'; Semedo (yellow card) 90+5'	Report	Al-Yazidi (yellow card) 16'; Akram Afif 67' (pen.); Abdurisag 90+7'	Stadium: Grand Hamad Stadium; Referee: Moatasem Al Mazyed

5 April 2024 Round 20	Al-Duhail	3–1	Al Sadd	Doha
21:30	Veríssimo (yellow card) 25'; Ismaeel Mohammad (yellow card) 36'; Almoez Ali 40'; Olunga 57'; Al-Brake 62'; Yousef Aymen (yellow card) 83'	Report	Otávio (yellow card) 39'; Akram Afif 45+2'	Stadium: Abdullah bin Khalifa Stadium; Referee: Abdulhadi Al Ruaile

17 April 2024 Round 13	Al-Ahli	1–9	Al Sadd	Doha
20:30	Yansané 45'; Doumbia (red card) 50'	Report	Akram Afif 3', 56'; Abdurisag 32'; Guilherme 35'; Waad (yellow card) 54'; Al-Ishaq 59' (o.g.); Housni 75'; Bounedjah 69', 80', 90+5'	Stadium: Al Thumama Stadium; Referee: Khamis Al Marri

24 April 2024 Round 21	Al-Shamal	0–4	Al Sadd	Doha
18:30	Ebrahimi (red card) 40'; Al Jabri (yellow card) 73'; Waad (red card) 73'	Report	Al-Haidos 9'; Plata 26' (red card) 73'; Assadalla (yellow card) 61'; Akram Afif 83' (pen.); Otávio 90+5'	Stadium: Al Bayt Stadium; Referee: Nayef Mohamed El-Kadiri

28 April 2024 Round 22	Al-Rayyan	4–0	Al Sadd	Doha
18:30	Guedes 15'; Rodrigo 50'; Taniguchi (yellow card) 64'; Gabriel Pereira 89'; Al-Rawi 90+3'	Report	Bounedjah (yellow card) 33'; Sayyar (yellow card) 35'	Stadium: Ahmad bin Ali Stadium; Referee: Mohamed Al-Shammari

=== Emir of Qatar Cup ===
9 May 2024 Round of 16	Al Sadd SC	3–2	Al-Markhiya	Doha
17:15		Report		Stadium: Abdullah bin Khalifa Stadium

13 May 2024 Quarter-finals	Al-Wakrah	0–1	Al Sadd SC	Al Rayyan
20:00		Report	Bounedjah 20'	Stadium: Ahmad bin Ali Stadium; Referee: Mohammed Al-Sherif

18 May 2024 Semi-finals	Al-Duhail	0–1	Al Sadd SC	Al Wakrah
19:00		Report	Akram Afif 46'	Stadium: Al Janoub Stadium; Referee: Abdulhadi Al Ruaile

24 May 2024 Final	Qatar SC	0–1 (a.e.t.)	Al Sadd SC	Al Rayyan
19:00		Report	Uribe 118'	Stadium: Education City Stadium; Referee: Salman Ahmad Falahi

=== AFC Champions League ===
==== Group stage ====
The draw for the group stage was held on 24 August 2023 at the AFC House in Kuala Lumpur, Malaysia. The 40 teams were drawn into ten groups of four: five groups each in the West Region (Groups A–E) and the East Region (Groups F–J). For each region, teams were seeded into four pots and drawn into the relevant positions within each group, based on their association ranking and their seeding within their association, in consideration of the technical balance between groups. Teams from the same association could not be drawn into the same group.

Pos	Team	Pld	W	D	L	GF	GA	GD	Pts	Qualification	NAS	SAD	SHJ	FAI
1	(Uzbekistan) Nasaf	6	3	2	1	10	6	+4	11	Advance to round of 16	—	3–1	1–1	3–1
2	(Qatar) Al Sadd	6	2	2	2	11	7	+4	8 (Note: Ranked on head-to-head points: Al Sadd 4, Sharjah 1.)		2–2	—	0–0	6–0
3	(United Arab Emirates) Sharjah	6	2	2	2	4	5	−1	8		1–0	0–2	—	1–0
4	(Jordan) Al-Faisaly	6	2	0	4	5	12	−7	6		0–1	2–0	2–1	—

Source: AFC
Notes:

18 September 2023 1	Al Sadd (Qatar)	0–0	(United Arab Emirates) Sharjah	Doha
21:00 UTC+3		Report		Stadium: Jassim bin Hamad Stadium; Attendance: 9,831; Referee: Muhammad Taqi (Singapore)

2 October 2023 2	Nasaf (Uzbekistan)	3–1	(Qatar) Al Sadd	Qarshi
21:00 UTC+5	Nurulloyev 29'; Amonov 46', 58'	Report	Khoukhi 83'	Stadium: Markaziy Stadium; Attendance: 8,428; Referee: Alireza Faghani (Iran)

23 October 2023 3	Al Sadd (Qatar)	6–0	(Jordan) Al-Faisaly	Doha
21:00 UTC+3	Bounedjah 8', 50', 63'; Plata 51'; Meshaal 52'; Abdurisag 83'	Report		Stadium: Jassim bin Hamad Stadium; Attendance: 10,380; Referee: Khaled Al Teris (Saudi Arabia)

6 November 2023 4	Al-Faisaly (Jordan)	2–0	(Qatar) Al Sadd	Amman
21:00 UTC+3	Al-Rushadi 56'; Al-Haj 85'	Report		Stadium: Amman International Stadium; Attendance: 2,430; Referee: Sadullo Gulmurodi (Tajikistan)

27 November 2023 5	Sharjah (United Arab Emirates)	0–2	(Qatar) Al Sadd	Sharjah
18:00 UTC+4		Report	Plata 9'; Bounedjah 60'	Stadium: Sharjah Stadium; Attendance: 1,512; Referee: Hiroyuki Kimura (Japan)

4 December 2023 6	Al Sadd (Qatar)	2–2	(Uzbekistan) Nasaf	Doha
19:00 UTC+3	Uribe 5'; Bounedjah 90+4'	Report	Jighauri 83', 90'	Stadium: Jassim bin Hamad Stadium; Attendance: 4,323; Referee: Ahmad Al Ali (Kuwait)

=== Arab Club Champions Cup ===
==== Group stage ====
The final tournament was held in Saudi Arabia from 27 July to 12 August 2023, across four cities: Abha, Al Bahah, Khamis Mushait and Taif. 16 teams were drawn into four groups of four. Ten teams already entered the group stage directly as league champions from Algeria, Egypt, Iraq, Morocco, Qatar, Saudi Arabia, and Tunisia. In addition the previous edition holders and runners-up, and one invitee selected by UAFA from the host nation enters directly to the group stage. Six teams advanced from the qualifying rounds to complete the 16-teams group stage. The winners and runners-up of each group advanced to the knockout stage.

Pos	Team	Pld	W	D	L	GF	GA	GD	Pts	Qualification
1	(Qatar) Al-Sadd	3	2	1	0	4	2	+2	7	Advance to knockout stage
2	(Saudi Arabia) Al-Hilal	3	1	1	1	4	4	0	4	Advance to knockout stage
3	(Morocco) Wydad AC	3	0	2	1	2	3	−1	2	
4	(Libya) Al-Ahli Tripoli	3	0	2	1	1	2	−1	2	

Source: UAFA
Rules for classification: Group stage tiebreakers

27 July 2023 1	Al Sadd (Qatar)	0–0	(Morocco) Wydad AC	Abha
16:00		Report		Stadium: Prince Sultan bin Abdul Aziz Stadium; Referee: Mahmoud El Banna (Egypt)

30 July 2023 2	Al-Hilal (Saudi Arabia)	2–3	(Qatar) Al Sadd	Abha
20:00	Michael 10'; S. Al-Dawsari 68' (pen.)	Report	Bounedjah 40'; Salman 51'; Plata 90+3'	Stadium: Prince Sultan bin Abdul Aziz Stadium; Referee: Dahane Beida (Mauritania)

2 August 2023 3	Al Sadd (Qatar)	1–0	(Libya) Al-Ahli Tripoli	Khamis Mushait
16:00	Otávio 89'	Report		Stadium: Damac Club Stadium; Referee: Haythem Guirat (Tunisia)

=== Knockout stage ===
==== Quarter-finals ====
5 August 2023	Al Sadd (Qatar)	2–4	(Iraq) Al-Shorta	Abha
18:00	Afif 24' (pen.), 81'	Report	Sabah 32'; Rostam 59' (pen.), 78'; Farhan 70'	Stadium: Prince Sultan bin Abdul Aziz Stadium; Referee: Khaled Al Teris (Saudi Arabia)

== Squad information ==
=== Appearances and goals ===
No.	Pos	Player	Nat	QSL			Emir of Qatar Cup			Champions League			Arab Club Champions			Total		
No.	Pos	Player	Nat	App	St	G	App	St	G	App	St	G	App	St	G	App	St	G
Goalkeepers
1	GK	Saad Al-Sheeb	(Qatar)	7	7	0	0	0	0	0	0	0	1	1	0	8	8	0
22	GK	Meshaal Barsham	(Qatar)	13	13	0	3	3	0	6	6	0	3	3	0	25	25	0
30	GK	Jehad Hudib	(Qatar)	0	0	0	0	0	0	0	0	0	0	0	0	0	0	0
31	GK	Yousef Abdullah	(Qatar)	2	2	0	0	0	0	0	0	0	0	0	0	2	2	0
99	GK	Abdulla Ibrahim	(Qatar)	0	0	0	0	0	0	0	0	0	0	0	0	0	0	0
Defenders
2	DF	Ró-Ró	(Qatar)	5	5	0	3	0	0	3	3	0	4	4	0	15	12	0
5	DF	Tarek Salman	(Qatar)	20	17	1	3	3	0	6	6	0	4	4	1	33	30	2
6	DF	Paulo Otávio	(Brazil)	22	21	2	3	3	0	5	5	0	3	1	1	33	30	3
12	DF	Ilyes Housni	(Morocco)	6	0	1	0	0	0	0	0	0	0	0	0	6	0	1
16	DF	Boualem Khoukhi	(Qatar)	20	19	0	3	3	0	6	6	1	4	4	0	33	32	1
~~29~~	DF	Romain Saïss (Note: Player transferred out during the season)	(Morocco)	0	0	0	0	0	0	0	0	0	3	0	0	3	0	0
37	DF	Ahmed Suhail	(Qatar)	10	3	0	0	0	0	1	0	0	0	0	0	11	3	0
55	DF	Amin Hazbavi	(Iran)	19	16	1	0	0	0	4	2	0	1	0	0	24	18	1
66	DF	Abdulrahman Al-Ameen	(Qatar)	0	0	0	0	0	0	0	0	0	0	0	0	0	0	0
70	DF	Musab Kheder	(Qatar)	9	5	0	0	0	0	4	3	0	3	3	0	16	11	0
96	DF	Anas Abweny	(Qatar)	0	0	0	0	0	0	0	0	0	0	0	0	0	0	0
98	DF	Nayef Hamid	(Qatar)	0	0	0	0	0	0	0	0	0	0	0	0	0	0	0
Midfielders
4	MF	Ahmed Sayyar	(Qatar)	8	1	0	0	0	0	0	0	0	4	4	0	12	5	0
7	MF	Mohammed Waad	(Qatar)	19	16	0	3	3	0	6	6	0	4	0	0	32	25	0
8	MF	Ali Assadalla	(Qatar)	15	5	2	0	0	0	4	1	0	3	3	0	24	8	2
10	MF	Hassan Al-Haydos	(Qatar)	21	14	4	2	0	0	0	0	0	4	4	0	27	18	4
13	MF	Abdullah Al-Yazidi	(Qatar)	7	3	0	3	3	0	1	0	0	1	0	0	12	6	0
14	MF	Mostafa Meshaal	(Qatar)	12	6	0	2	0	0	4	0	1	1	0	0	19	6	1
18	MF	Guilherme Torres	(Brazil)	14	13	3	0	0	0	2	2	0	1	0	0	17	15	3
19	MF	Gonzalo Plata	(Ecuador)	21	21	8	2	2	0	5	5	2	3	1	1	31	29	11
20	MF	Salem Al-Hajri	(Qatar)	0	0	0	0	0	0	0	0	0	0	0	0	0	0	0
23	MF	Hashim Ali	(Qatar)	12	1	1	0	0	0	2	0	0	1	0	0	15	1	1
25	MF	Mohammed Al-Quraishi	(Qatar)	0	0	0	0	0	0	0	0	0	0	0	0	0	0	0
33	MF	Moaz El-Wadia	(Qatar)	0	0	0	0	0	0	0	0	0	0	0	0	0	0	0
86	MF	Mohamed Faragalla	(Qatar)	0	0	0	0	0	0	0	0	0	0	0	0	0	0	0
88	MF	Mateus Uribe	(Colombia)	9	9	0	3	3	1	5	4	1	4	4	0	21	20	2
97	MF	Abdulla Mahdi	(Qatar)	0	0	0	0	0	0	0	0	0	0	0	0	0	0	0
Forwardas
9	FW	Yusuf Abdurisag	(Qatar)	17	10	5	2	2	0	5	1	1	2	0	0	26	13	6
11	FW	Baghdad Bounedjah	(Algeria)	20	14	8	3	3	1	6	5	5	4	4	1	33	26	15
28	FW	Ahmad Al-Saeed	(Qatar)	3	0	0	0	0	0	1	0	0	1	0	0	5	0	0
51	FW	Akram Afif	(Qatar)	22	21	26	3	3	1	5	5	0	4	4	2	34	33	29
Total				22		65	3		3	6		11	4		6	35		49

Last updated: 5 August 2023
Source: Soccerway

=== Goalscorers ===
Includes all competitive matches. The list is sorted alphabetically by surname when total goals are equal.

No.	Nat.	Player	Pos.	QSL	QEC	CL 1	ACC	TOTAL
51	(Qatar)	Akram Afif	FW	26	0	0	2	28
11	(Algeria)	Baghdad Bounedjah	FW	8	0	5	1	14
19	(Ecuador)	Gonzalo Plata	MF	8	0	2	1	11
9	(Qatar)	Yusuf Abdurisag	FW	5	0	1	0	6
10	(Qatar)	Hassan Al-Haydos	MF	4	0	0	0	4
18	(Brazil)	Guilherme Torres	FW	3	0	0	0	3
6	(Brazil)	Paulo Otávio	DF	2	0	0	1	3
8	(Qatar)	Ali Assadalla	MF	2	0	0	0	2
55	(Iran)	Amin Hazbavi	DF	1	0	0	0	1
12	(Morocco)	Ilyes Housni	DF	1	0	0	0	1
23	(Qatar)	Hashim Ali	MF	1	0	0	0	1
88	(Colombia)	Mateus Uribe	MF	0	0	1	0	1
16	(Qatar)	Boualem Khoukhi	DF	0	0	1	0	1
5	(Qatar)	Tarek Salman	DF	0	0	0	1	1
14	(Qatar)	Mostafa Meshaal	MF	0	0	1	0	1
Own Goals				3	0	0	0	3
Totals				65	0	11	6	82

=== Assists ===
No.	Nat.	Player	Pos.	QSL	QEC	CL 1	ACC	TOTAL
51	(Qatar)	Akram Afif	FW	11	0	1	0	12
19	(Ecuador)	Gonzalo Plata	MF	6	0	1	0	7
11	(Algeria)	Baghdad Bounedjah	FW	4	0	0	2	6
10	(Qatar)	Hassan Al-Haydos	MF	6	0	0	0	6
7	(Qatar)	Mohammed Waad	MF	2	0	2	1	5
6	(Brazil)	Paulo Otávio	DF	4	0	1	0	5
8	(Qatar)	Ali Assadalla	MF	3	0	1	1	5
18	(Brazil)	Guilherme Torres	FW	2	0	0	0	2
16	(Qatar)	Boualem Khoukhi	DF	1	0	1	0	2
9	(Qatar)	Yusuf Abdurisag	FW	2	0	0	0	2
88	(Colombia)	Mateus Uribe	MF	1	0	0	0	1
23	(Qatar)	Hashim Ali	MF	1	0	0	0	1
2	(Qatar)	Ró-Ró	DF	0	0	1	0	1
55	(Iran)	Amin Hazbavi	DF	0	0	1	0	1
Totals				43	0	9	4	56

=== Clean sheets ===
Includes all competitive matches.

					Clean sheets				
No.	Nat	Name	GP	GA	QSL	QEC	CL 1	ACC	Total
1	(Qatar)	Saad Al-Sheeb	8	6	4	0	0	1	5
22	(Qatar)	Meshaal Barsham	21	23	6	0	3	1	10
31	(Qatar)	Yousef Abdullah	2	6	0	0	0	0	0
		TOTALS		34	10	0	3	2	15

== Transfers ==
=== In ===
Date	Pos	Player	From club	Transfer fee	Source
17 May 2023	LB	(Brazil) Paulo Otávio	(Germany) VfL Wolfsburg	Free transfer	
25 May 2023	DF	(Iran) Amin Hazbavi	(Iran) Foolad	Free transfer	
5 June 2023	MF	(Colombia) Mateus Uribe	(Portugal) Porto	Free transfer	
27 June 2023	FW	(Brazil) Giovanni Henrique	(Brazil) Palmeiras	€9 million	
23 July 2023	RW	(Ecuador) Gonzalo Plata	(Spain) Valladolid	Free transfer	
24 July 2023	DF	(Morocco) Romain Saïss	(Turkey) Beşiktaş	€2.5 million	
18 September 2023	FW	(Morocco) Ilyes Housni	(France) Paris Saint-Germain	Loan for one year	

=== Out ===
Date	Pos	Player	To club	Transfer fee	Source
20 July 2023	MF	(South Korea) Jung Woo-young	(Saudi Arabia) Al-Khaleej	Free transfer	
6 August 2023	FW	(Morocco) Ayoub El Kaabi	(Greece) Olympiacos	Free transfer	
16 August 2023	MF	(Spain) Santi Cazorla	(Spain) Oviedo	Free transfer	
5 September 2023	DF	(Morocco) Romain Saïss	(Saudi Arabia) Al-Shabab	Loan for one year	
