= Omar Salah =

Omar Salah may refer to:

- Omar Salah (footballer, born 1998), Egyptian football goalkeeper
- Omar Salah (footballer, born 2003), Jordanian football midfielder
