= Jassem Al-Hashemi =

Qatari footballer (born 1996)

Personal information
- Full name: Jassem Ali Al-Hashemi
- Date of birth: 27 January 1996 (age 30)
- Place of birth: Qatar
- Position: Left-back

Team information
- Current team: Al-Waab
- Number: 67

Youth career
- El Jaish

Senior career*
Years	Team	Apps	(Gls)
2015–2017	El Jaish	16	(0)
2017–2019	Qatar SC	14	(0)
2019–2022	Al-Wakrah	22	(1)
2022–2025	Al-Shamal	36	(0)
2025–	Al-Waab	0	(0)
- * Club domestic league appearances and goals

Jassem Al-Hashemi (Arabic: جاسم الهاشمي; born 27 January 1996) is a Qatari footballer. He currently plays for Al-Waab as a left back.
