= 2026 Basra International Tournament =

Basra International Tournament 2026 بطولة البصرة الدولية

Tournament details
- Host country: Iraq
- City: Basra
- Dates: 13–17 November 2026
- Teams: 4
- Venue: Basra International Stadium

Final positions
- Champions: Iran
- Runners-up: Iraq
- Third place: Lebanon
- Fourth place: Palestine

Tournament statistics
- Matches played: 4
- Goals scored: 4 (1 per match)
- Attendance: 71,504 (17,876 per match)
- Top scorer(s): Four players (1 goal each)
- Best player: (Iraq) Ahmed Yahya
- Best goalkeeper: (Lebanon) Mostafa Matar

The 2026 Basra International Tournament (Arabic: بطولة البصرة الدولية) was an international football tournament held in Basra, Iraq. The tournament took place from 13 to 17 November 2026, featuring the national teams of Iran, Iraq, Lebanon, and Palestine. It was held at Basra International Stadium.

Iran finished first in the standings with four points, follwed by Iraq and Lebanon with two points, and Palestine with one.

== Format ==
The tournament featured four national teams in a league-style format, with each team playing two matches. The final standings determined the overall ranking of the participating teams.

== Teams ==
| Country | Sub-confederation | FIFA Ranking (October 2026) |
|---|---|---|
| Iraq (hosts) | WAFF | 63 |
| Iran | CAFA | 23 |
| Palestine | WAFF | 92 |
| Lebanon | WAFF | 112 |

== Venue ==
- All matches were held at Basra International Stadium in Basra, Iraq.

| Basra | 2026 Basra International Tournament (Iraq) |
|---|---|
| Basra International Stadium | 2026 Basra International Tournament (Iraq) |
| 30°26′25.1″N 47°46′50.9″E | 2026 Basra International Tournament (Iraq) |
| Capacity: 65,227 | 2026 Basra International Tournament (Iraq) |

== Matches ==
| Pos | Team | Pld | W | D | L | GF | GA | GD | Pts | |
|---|---|---|---|---|---|---|---|---|---|---|
| 1 | Iran | 2 | 1 | 1 | 0 | 3 | 1 | +2 | 4 | Champions |
| 2 | Iraq (H) | 2 | 0 | 2 | 0 | 1 | 1 | 0 | 2 | Runners-up |
| 3 | Lebanon | 2 | 0 | 2 | 0 | 0 | 0 | 0 | 2 | Third place |
| 4 | Palestine | 2 | 0 | 1 | 1 | 0 | 2 | −2 | 1 | |

Source: Global Sports Archive
(H) Hosts
13 November 2026
18:00

| Iraq | 0–0 | Lebanon |
|---|---|---|
| | Report |

Basra International Stadium, Basra
Attendance: 21,762
Referee: Ali Abbas (Kuwait)
14 November 2026
18:00

| Iran | 2–0 | Palestine |
|---|---|---|
| Azmoun 76'; Hardani 84' | Report |

Basra International Stadium, Basra
Referee: Mohanad Qasim Sarray (Iraq)

17 November 2026
16:00

| Lebanon | 0–0 | Palestine |
|---|---|---|
| | Report |

Basra International Stadium, Basra
Referee: Ahmed Kadhim Gatea (Iraq)
17 November 2026
19:15

| Iraq | 1–1 | Iran |
|---|---|---|
| Al-Saedi 1' | Report | Hazbavi 83' |

Basra International Stadium, Basra
Attendance: 49,742
Referee: Ammar Ashkanani (Kuwait)

== Goalscorers ==
There were 4 goals scored in 4 matches, for an average of 1 goal per match.

1 goal

- (Iran) Sardar Azmoun
- (Iran) Saleh Hardani
- (Iran) Amin Hazbavi
- (Iraq) Hussein Ali Al-Saedi

== Awards ==
The following awards were presented at the end of the tournament:

| Best Player | Best Goalkeeper |
|---|---|
| (Iraq) Ahmed Yahya | (Lebanon) Mostafa Matar |

== See also ==
- 2026 Casper Cup
- 2026 King's Cup
