= Mostafa Matar =

Lebanese footballer (born 1995)

- Matar with Lebanon in 2024

Personal information
- Full name: Mostafa Ali Matar
- Date of birth: 10 September 1995 (age 31)
- Place of birth: Miniyeh, Lebanon
- Height: 1.85 m (6 ft 1 in)
- Position: Goalkeeper

Team information
- Current team: Nejmeh
- Number: 95

Senior career*
Years	Team	Apps	(Gls)
2015–2020	Salam Zgharta	63	(0)
2020–2024	Ahed	44	(0)
2020–2021	→ Tripoli (loan)	10	(0)
2022–2023	→ Al-Orobah (loan)	23	(0)
2024–2025	Safa	23	(0)
2025–	Nejmeh	27	(0)

International career^{‡}
2017	Lebanon U23	3	(0)
2018–	Lebanon	47	(0)
- * Club domestic league appearances and goals as of 09:14, 3 August 2026 (UTC) ‡ National team caps and goals as of 17 November 2026

Mostafa Ali Matar (Arabic: مصطفى علي مطر, Lebanese Arabic pronunciation: [ˈmosˤtˤɑfa mɑtˤɑr]; born 10 September 1995) is a Lebanese footballer who plays as a goalkeeper for Lebanese Premier League club Nejmeh and the Lebanon national team.

Matar began his senior career in 2015 with Salam Zgharta in the Lebanese Premier League. In summer 2020, he joined league champions Ahed for a national-record fee of LL525 million and was promptly moved to Tripoli on a one-year loan. Matar returned to Ahed in 2021 and was their first-choice goalkeeper in their 2021–22 league title win. In summer 2022, he moved to Saudi side Al-Orobah on loan. Matar moved to Safa in 2024, and to Nejmeh in 2025.

Having represented Lebanon internationally at the under-23 level, Matar was called up for the senior team to the 2019 AFC Asian Cup. He made his senior debut at the 2019 WAFF Championship, and participated in the qualifications for the 2022 FIFA World Cup.

== Club career ==
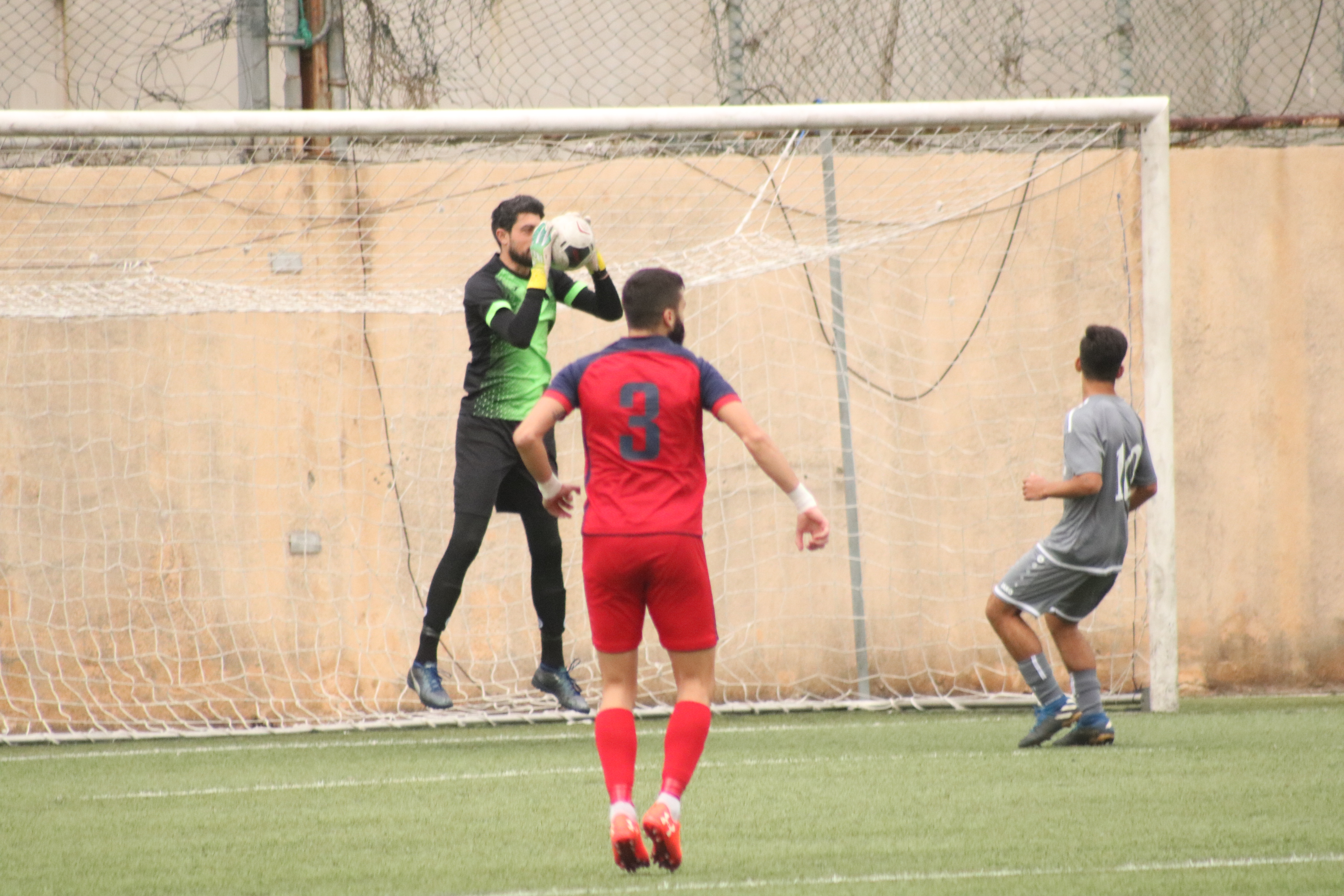
Matar with Tripoli against Tadamon Sour in 2020

Following five years at Salam Zgharta, Matar joined AFC Cup champions Ahed on 2 July 2020 on a five-year deal for LL525 million (around $333,000). The fee was the highest ever paid by a Lebanese club. He joined Tripoli on a one-year loan on 29 September 2020. He returned from the loan on 5 May 2021, and was Ahed's main goalkeeper in their 2021–22 league title win, conceding only six goals in 19 games.

On 21 June 2022, Matar moved to Al-Orobah in the Saudi First Division League on a 10-month loan. He returned to Ahed ahead of the 2023–24 Lebanese Premier League season, following the departure of Mehdi Khalil on loan to Jordan.

Prior to the 2024–25 Lebanese Premier League, Matar moved to Safa on a five-year contract. In August 2025, Matar joined Nejmeh ahead of the 2025–26 season. His contract with Nejmeh was renewed for a further season in September 2026.

== International career ==
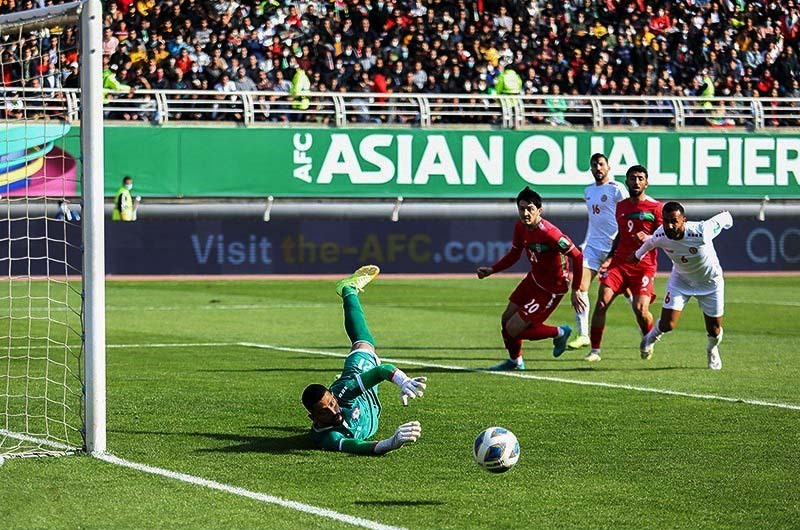
Matar with the Lebanon national team against Iran in 2022

=== 2017–2019: Early career ===
Matar played for the Lebanon national under-23 team at the 2018 AFC U-23 Championship qualification, and was their captain on one occasion.

In December 2018, Matar was called up for the 2019 AFC Asian Cup squad for the senior team. His debut came on 8 August 2019, against Yemen at the 2019 WAFF Championship.

=== 2021–present: Breakthrough ===
Having been called up as Lebanon's third-choice keeper, Matar played as a starter in the third round of qualification for the 2022 FIFA World Cup, following Mehdi Khalil's ACL injury and Ali Daher resulting positive to COVID-19. He kept a clean sheet in a 0–0 draw against the United Arab Emirates in the opening game, and was nominated Man of the Match. Matar continued as Lebanon's starting goalkeeper at the 2021 FIFA Arab Cup in December, where he was praised for his performances despite conceding three goals in defeats to Egypt and Algeria.

In December 2023, Matar was included in the Lebanese squad for the 2023 AFC Asian Cup. He started all three of Lebanon's matches at the tournament, keeping a clean sheet in a 0–0 draw against China and being named man of the match. After keeping two clean sheets in both of Lebanon's games at the 2026 Basra Tournament, Matar was named best goalkeeper of the tournament.

== Career statistics ==
=== International ===
As of match played 17 November 2026

Appearances and goals by national team and year
National team	Year	Apps	Goals
Lebanon	2018	1	0
Lebanon	2019	2	0
Lebanon	2020	0	0
Lebanon	2021	9	0
Lebanon	2022	4	0
Lebanon	2023	5	0
Lebanon	2024	12	0
Lebanon	2025	9	0
Lebanon	2026	5	0
Total		47	0

== Honours ==
Ahed

- Lebanese Premier League: 2021–22
- Lebanese Federation Cup: 2023
- Lebanese FA Cup runner-up: 2023–24
- Lebanese Elite Cup runner-up: 2021
- Lebanese Super Cup runner-up: 2023
- AFC Cup runner-up: 2023–24

Nejmeh

- Lebanese FA Cup: 2025–26

Individual

- Lebanese Premier League Team of the Season: 2016–17
- Basra International Tournament Best Goalkeeper: 2026
