= Mateus Uribe =

Colombian footballer (born 1991)

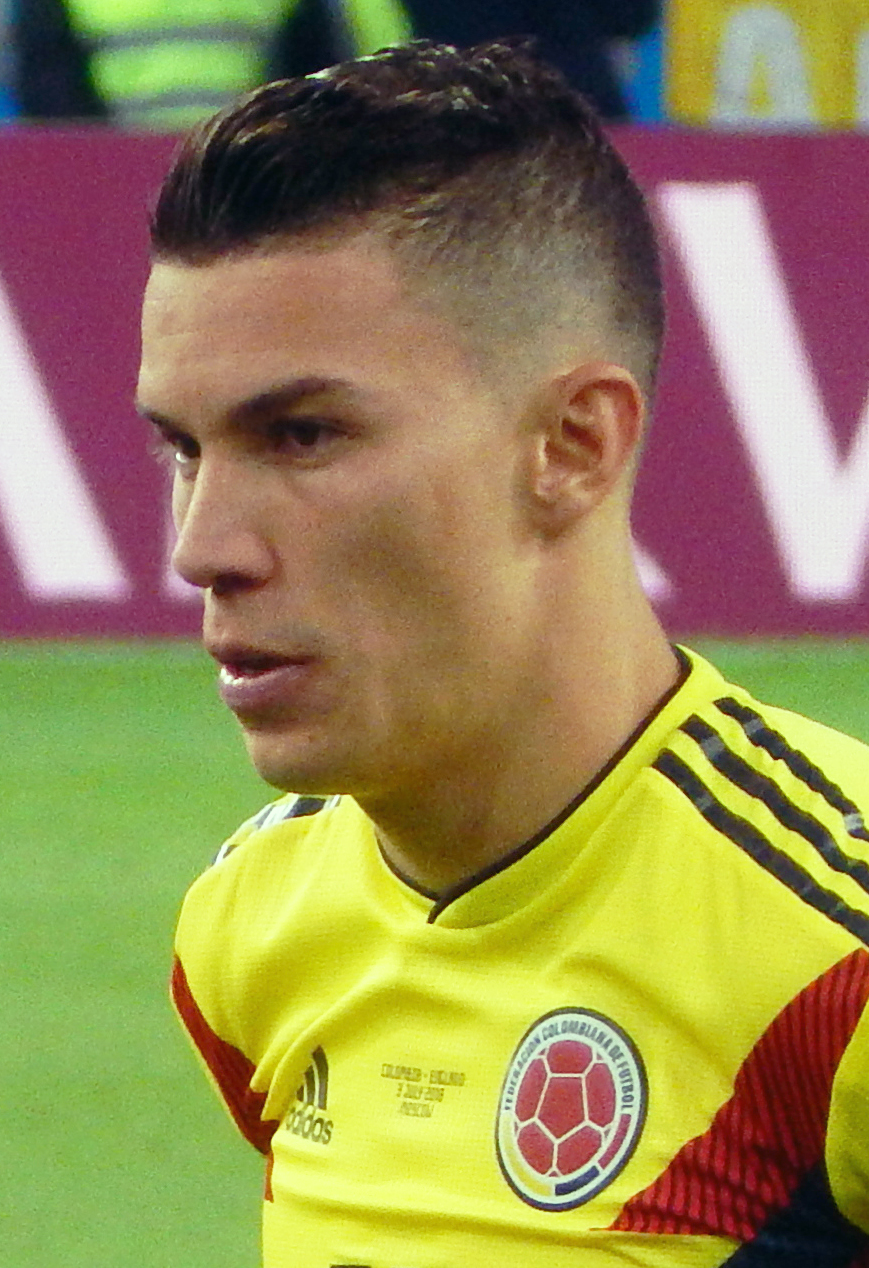
- Uribe playing for Colombia at the 2018 FIFA World Cup

Personal information
- Full name: Andrés Mateus Uribe Villa
- Date of birth: 21 March 1991 (age 35)
- Place of birth: Medellín, Colombia
- Height: 1.82 m (6 ft 0 in)
- Position: Midfielder

Team information
- Current team: Atlético Nacional
- Number: 8

Youth career
- Envigado

Senior career*
Years	Team	Apps	(Gls)
2010–2011	Deportivo Español	4	(2)
2012–2016	Envigado	87	(7)
2015–2016	→ Deportes Tolima (loan)	49	(9)
2016–2017	Atlético Nacional	28	(6)
2017–2019	América	65	(15)
2019–2023	Porto	113	(10)
2023–2025	Al Sadd	14	(0)
2025–	Atlético Nacional	27	(2)

International career
2017–2024	Colombia	62	(6)
Medal record
Men's football
Representing Colombia
Copa América
Runner-up	2024 United States
Third place	2021 Brazil
- * Club domestic league appearances and goals as of 11 December 2025 (UTC)

Andrés Mateus Uribe Villa (born 21 March 1991) is a Colombian professional footballer who plays as a central midfielder for Categoría Primera A club Atlético Nacional.

After coming through the ranks of Envigado's youth academy, Uribe made his professional debut with Argentine third division side Deportivo Español before returning to Envigado in 2012. After a loan to Deportes Tolima in 2015, he joined Atlético Nacional, where he won the Copa Colombia in 2016, and the league title in 2017. Uribe then signed with Liga MX side Club América, where he won an Apertura title, the Copa MX Clausura, and the Campeón de Campeones title. In 2019, he joined Portuguese side Porto and won eight trophies with the club, including two Primeira Liga, three Taça de Portugal, one Taça da Liga and two Supertaça Cândido de Oliveira titles. In 2023, Uribe joined Qatar Stars League side Al Sadd on a free transfer and went on to win the Emir Cup the following year, scoring the decisive goal in the final.

A full international with Colombia from 2017 to 2024, he played for the side at the 2018 FIFA World Cup as well as the 2019, 2021, and 2024 Copa América, where the latter finished runners-up to Argentina.

== Club career ==
=== Early career ===
Born in Medellín, Uribe was formed at Envigado FC. As first-team opportunities were limited, he played a year in the regional league of Antioquia Department, and his first professional games at Deportivo Español in the Primera B Metropolitana, on the third tier of the Argentine football league system. He scored twice in four games during his experience in Buenos Aires. On returning home, he played regularly in the Categoría Primera A for Envigado, Deportes Tolima and Atlético Nacional.

=== América ===
On 1 August 2017, Uribe joined Club América of the Mexican Liga MX. He scored 14 goals across all competitions in his first season in Mexico City, including two in a 4–1 win at Pumas UNAM on 3 May 2018 in the Clausura Liguilla quarter-finals. He was named in the 2018 Clausura Best XI.

=== Porto ===
Uribe joined Portuguese club FC Porto on 4 August 2019, on a four-year deal for a €10 million fee, earning a net annual salary of €3 million. Nine days later, he made his debut for the Dragons in their UEFA Champions League first qualifying round second leg at home to FC Krasnodar; he came on in the 49th minute for the injured Sérgio Oliveira in a 3–2 loss (3–3 aggregate draw and elimination on away goals). In November, he and teammates Luis Díaz, Agustín Marchesín and Renzo Saravia were suspended from the derby game against Boavista F.C. for having partied the night before; the incident was involuntarily exposed by his wife Cindy Álvarez García on Instagram.

Uribe scored his first goal for Porto – already crowned champions – to open a 2–1 loss at S.C. Braga on 25 July 2020, the last day of the season. However, he was substituted with injury moments later. The following 10 February in a Taça de Portugal semi-final 1–1 draw at the same opponents, after compatriot Díaz had already been sent off, he joined him by headbutting Ricardo Esgaio.

=== Al Sadd ===
On 5 June 2023, Uribe signed a three-year contract with Qatari club Al Sadd on a free transfer.

On 24 June 2024, he netted his first goal for Al Sadd in the Amir Cup, scoring a 118th-minute goal against Qatar SC to clinch his first title with the club.

On 4 January 2025, Al Sadd announced that they had terminated Uribe's contract by mutual consent.

== International career ==
Uribe made his debut for the Colombia national team on 25 January 2017, against Brazil at the Estádio Olímpico Nilton Santos in Rio de Janeiro. He played the full 90 minutes of the 1–0 defeat.

On 4 June 2018, Uribe was named in Colombia's final 23-man squad for the 2018 FIFA World Cup in Russia. He played in three of Colombia's four matches in the tournament, starting the game against Senegal. Uribe hit the crossbar with his penalty during Colombia's 4–3 penalty shootout defeat against England in the round of 16, after the game had finished 1–1 after extra time.

Uribe scored his first international goals on 9 June 2019, two of a 3–0 friendly win away to Peru ahead of his participation in the Copa América tournament in Brazil.

== Career statistics ==
=== Club ===
As of match played 24 August 2025

Appearances and goals by club, season and competition
Club	Season	League			National cup (Note: Includes Copa Colombia, Copa MX, Taça de Portugal and Emir of Qatar Cup)		League cup (Note: Includes Taça da Liga)		Continental		Other		Total	
Club	Season	Division	Apps	Goals	Apps	Goals	Apps	Goals	Apps	Goals	Apps	Goals	Apps	Goals
Deportivo Español	2010–11	Primera B Metropolitana	4	2	—		—		—		—		4	2
Envigado	2012	Categoría Primera A	30	1	5	2	—		4 (Note: Appearances in Copa Sudamericana)	0	—		39	3
Envigado	2013	Categoría Primera A	28	3	4	1	—		—		—		32	4
Envigado	2014	Categoría Primera A	29	3	2	0	—		—		—		31	3
Envigado	Total		87	7	11	3	—		4	0	—		102	10
Deportes Tolima	2015	Categoría Primera A	33	2	7	1	—		3	0	—		43	3
Deportes Tolima	2016	Categoría Primera A	16	7	5	3	—		—		—		21	10
Deportes Tolima	Total		49	9	12	4	—		3	0	—		64	13
Atlético Nacional	2016	Categoría Primera A	11	1	8	0	—		7	1	2 (Note: Appearances in FIFA Club World Cup)	0	28	2
Atlético Nacional	2017	Categoría Primera A	17	5	0	0	—		2 (Note: Appearances in Copa Libertadores)	1	—		19	6
Atlético Nacional	Total		28	6	8	0	—		9	2	2	0	47	8
América	2017–18	Liga MX	30	11	3	0	—		5 (Note: Appearances in CONCACAF Champions League)	3	—		38	14
América	2018–19	Liga MX	33	3	5	0	—		—		—		38	3
América	2019–20	Liga MX	2	1	0	0	—		0	0	2 (Note: One appearance in Leagues Cup, one appearance in Campeón de Campeones)	0	4	1
América	Total		65	15	8	0	—		5	3	2	0	80	18
Porto	2019–20	Primeira Liga	26	1	4	0	3	0	8 (Note: One appearance in UEFA Champions League, seven appearances in UEFA Europa League)	0	—		41	1
Porto	2020–21	Primeira Liga	31	4	3	0	2	0	9 (Note: Appearances in UEFA Champions League)	1	1 (Note: Appearance in Supertaça Cândido de Oliveira)	0	46	5
Porto	2021–22	Primeira Liga	25	1	5	2	0	0	8 (Note: Four appearances in UEFA Champions League, four appearances and one goal in UEFA Europa League)	1	—		38	4
Porto	2022–23	Primeira Liga	31	4	6	0	6	0	7	1	1	0	51	5
Porto	Total		113	10	18	2	11	0	32	3	2	0	176	15
Al Sadd	2023–24	Qatar Stars League	9	0	4	1	—		5 (Note: Appearances in AFC Champions League)	1	4 (Note: Appearances in Arab Club Champions Cup)	0	22	2
Al Sadd	2024–25	Qatar Stars League	6	0	0	0	—		5	1	—		11	1
Al Sadd	Total		15	0	4	1	—		10	2	4	0	33	3
Atlético Nacional	2025	Categoría Primera A	17	0	2	0	—		5 (Note: Appearances in Copa Libertadores)	0	2 (Note: Appearances in Superliga Colombiana)	0	26	0
Career total			378	49	63	10	11	0	68	10	12	0	532	69

=== International ===
As of match played 10 October 2024

Appearances and goals by national team and year
National team	Year	Apps	Goals
Colombia	2017	5	0
Colombia	2018	10	0
Colombia	2019	11	3
Colombia	2020	2	0
Colombia	2021	11	1
Colombia	2022	4	1
Colombia	2023	10	1
Colombia	2024	9	0
Total		62	6

Scores and results list Colombia's goal tally first, score column indicates score after each Uribe goal.

List of international goals scored by Mateus Uribe
No.	Date	Venue	Opponent	Score	Result	Competition
1	9 June 2019	Estadio Monumental "U", Lima, Peru	Peru	1–0	3–0	Friendly
2	9 June 2019	Estadio Monumental "U", Lima, Peru	Peru	2–0	3–0	Friendly
3	19 November 2019	Red Bull Arena, Harrison, United States	Ecuador	1–0	1–0	Friendly
4	3 June 2021	Estadio Nacional, Lima, Peru	Peru	2–0	3–0	2022 FIFA World Cup qualification
5	24 March 2022	Estadio Metropolitano Roberto Meléndez, Barranquilla, Colombia	Bolivia	3–0	3–0	2022 FIFA World Cup qualification
6	12 October 2023	Estadio Metropolitano Roberto Meléndez, Barranquilla, Colombia	Uruguay	2–1	2–2	2026 FIFA World Cup qualification

== Honours ==
Atlético Nacional

- Categoría Primera A: Torneo Apertura 2017
- Copa Colombia: 2016
- Copa Libertadores: 2016
- Recopa Sudamericana: 2017
- superliga betplay:2025 superliga

América

- Liga MX: Apertura 2018
- Copa MX: Clausura 2019
- Campeón de Campeones: 2019

Porto

- Primeira Liga: 2019–20, 2021–22
- Taça de Portugal: 2019–20, 2021–22, 2022–23
- Taça da Liga: 2022–23
- Supertaça Cândido de Oliveira: 2020, 2022

Al Sadd

- Amir Cup: 2024

Individual

- CONCACAF Champions League Best XI: 2018
- Liga MX Best XI: 2018 Clausura
