= Paulo Otávio =

Brazilian footballer

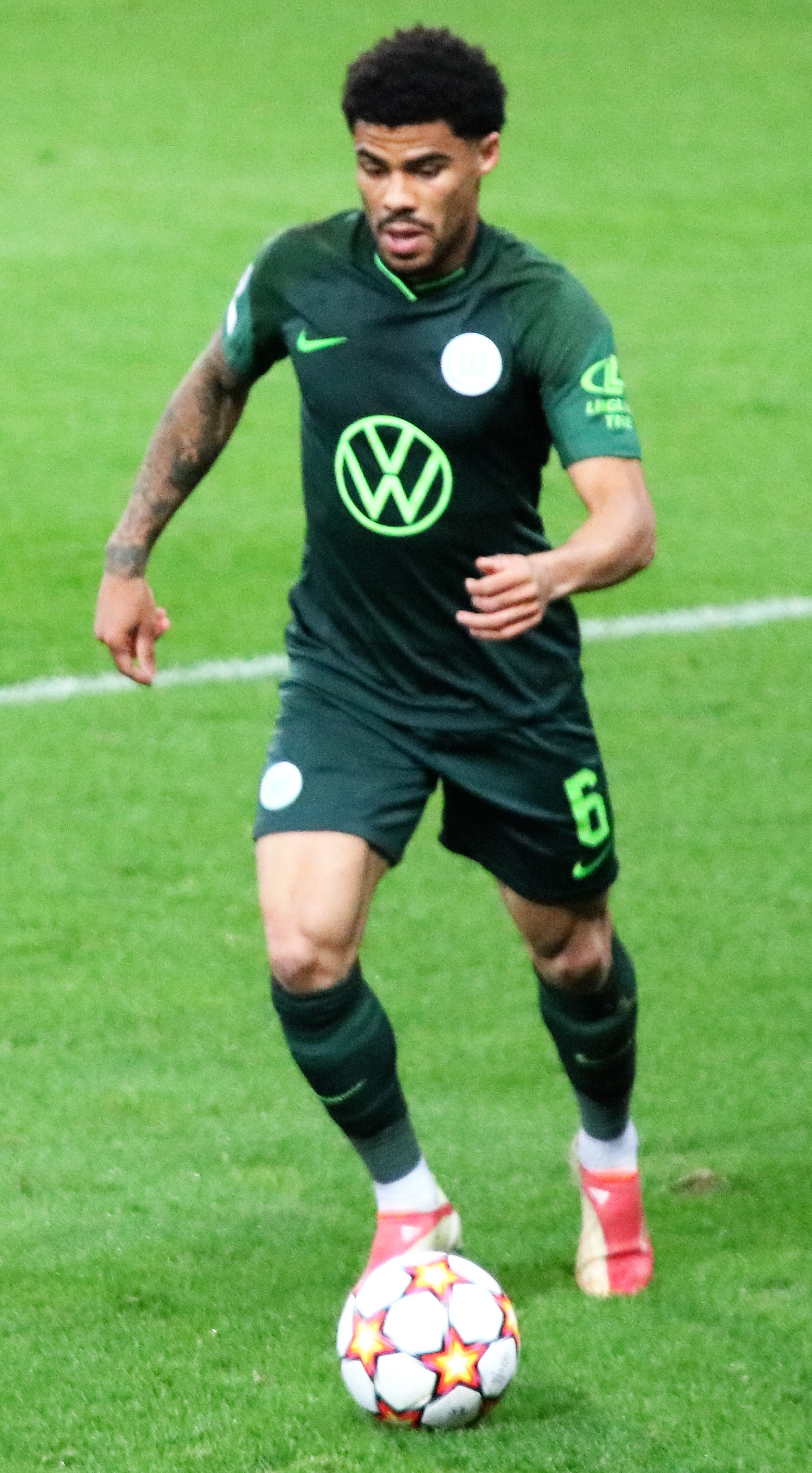
- Otávio playing for VfL Wolfsburg in 2021

Personal information
- Full name: Paulo Otávio Rosa da Silva
- Date of birth: 23 November 1994 (age 31)
- Place of birth: Ourinhos, São Paulo, Brazil
- Height: 1.73 m (5 ft 8 in)
- Position: Left back

Team information
- Current team: Al Sadd
- Number: 6

Senior career*
| Years | Team | Apps | (Gls) |
| 2011 | PSTC | 2 | (0) |
| 2012 | Atlético Paranaense | 0 | (0) |
| 2013–2015 | Coritiba | 0 | (0) |
| 2014 | → Santo André (loan) | 0 | (0) |
| 2015 | → Paysandu (loan) | 2 | (0) |
| 2016 | Tombense | 0 | (0) |
| 2016–2017 | LASK | 28 | (2) |
| 2017–2019 | FC Ingolstadt | 35 | (0) |
| 2019–2023 | VfL Wolfsburg | 60 | (0) |
| 2023– | Al Sadd | 48 | (3) |
- * Club domestic league appearances and goals as of 17 January 2026

Paulo Otávio Rosa da Silva (born 23 November 1994), commonly known as Paulo Otávio, is a Brazilian footballer who currently plays as a left back for Qatar Stars League club Al Sadd.

== Career ==
On 11 June 2019, VfL Wolfsburg announced that they had signed Otávio on a 4-year contract.

On March 6th, 2021, Otávio made a last-ditch tackle in a 2-1 loss to Hoffenheim, resulting in a suspension and a red card. Despite the consequences, many people online praised the tackle, saying it was “Heroic defending”.

On 17 May 2023, Otávio signed a three-year contract with Qatari club Al Sadd on a free transfer, starting from the 2023-24 season.

== Career statistics ==
=== Club ===
As of 17 May 2023.

| Club | Season | League | | | Cup | | Other | | Total | |
| Club | Season | Division | Apps | Goals | Apps | Goals | Apps | Goals | Apps | Goals |
|---|---|---|---|---|---|---|---|---|---|---|
| Atlético Paranaense | 2012 | Série B | 0 | 0 | 0 | 0 | 7 (Note: Appearances in the Campeonato Paranaense) | 0 | 7 | 0 |
| Coritiba | 2013 | Série A | 0 | 0 | 0 | 0 | 0 | 0 | 0 | 0 |
| Coritiba | 2014 | Série A | 0 | 0 | 0 | 0 | 5 | 0 | 5 | 0 |
| Coritiba | 2015 | Série A | 0 | 0 | 0 | 0 | 1 | 0 | 1 | 0 |
| Coritiba | Total | | 0 | 0 | 0 | 0 | 6 | 0 | 6 | 0 |
| Santo André (loan) | 2014 | – | | | 16 (Note: Appearances in the Copa Paulista) | 2 | 0 | 0 | 16 | 2 |
| Paysandu (loan) | 2015 | Série B | 2 | 0 | 1 (Note: Appearances in the Copa do Brasil) | 0 | 0 | 0 | 3 | 0 |
| Tombense | 2016 | Série C | 0 | 0 | 1 | 0 | 8 (Note: Appearances in the Campeonato Mineiro) | 2 | 9 | 2 |
| LASK Linz | 2016–17 | Erste Liga | 28 | 2 | 3 (Note: Appearances in the Austrian Cup) | 0 | 0 | 0 | 31 | 3 |
| FC Ingolstadt | 2017–18 | 2. Bundesliga | 8 | 0 | 1 (Note: Appearances in the DFB-Pokal) | 0 | 0 | 0 | 9 | 0 |
| FC Ingolstadt | 2018–19 | 2. Bundesliga | 27 | 0 | 2 | 0 | 0 | 0 | 29 | 0 |
| VfL Wolfburg | 2019–20 | Bundesliga | 5 | 0 | 4 | 0 | 4 (Note: Appearances in the UEFA Europa League) | 1 | 13 | 1 |
| VfL Wolfburg | 2020–21 | Bundesliga | 23 | 0 | 0 | 0 | 3 | 0 | 26 | 0 |
| VfL Wolfburg | 2021–22 | Bundesliga | 7 | 0 | 2 | 0 | 4 | 0 | 23 | 0 |
| VfL Wolfburg | 2022–23 | Bundesliga | 25 | 0 | 0 | 0 | 0 | 0 | 25 | 0 |
| Total | Brazil | | 2 | 0 | 18 | 2 | 21 | 2 | 41 | 4 |
| Total | Austria | | 28 | 2 | 3 | 0 | 0 | 0 | 31 | 3 |
| Total | Germany | | 95 | 0 | 9 | 0 | 11 | 1 | 181 | 1 |
| Total | Career total | | 125 | 2 | 30 | 2 | 32 | 3 | 253 | 8 |

== Honours ==
LASK

- Austria Football First League: 2016-17

Al Sadd

- Qatar Stars League: 2023-24
- Emir of Qatar Cup: 2024
