= Mohammed Al Jabri =

Qatari footballer (born 1991)

Personal information
- Full name: Mohammed Ahmed Mohammed Al Jabri
- Date of birth: 30 March 1991 (age 35)
- Place of birth: Qatar
- Positions: Midfielder; defender

Youth career
- Al Sadd

Senior career*
| Years | Team | Apps | (Gls) |
| 2010–2011 | Al Sadd | 0 | (0) |
| 2011–2017 | El Jaish | 46 | (0) |
| 2017–2019 | Qatar SC | 33 | (0) |
| 2019–2021 | Al-Khor | 30 | (0) |
| 2021–2024 | Al-Shamal | 51 | (0) |
| 2024–2025 | Mesaimeer | | |
- * Club domestic league appearances and goals

Mohammed Al Jabri (Arabic:محمد الجابري; born 30 March 1991) is a Qatari footballer. He currently plays as a defender.
