= Amin Hazbavi =

Iranian footballer

Personal information
- Full name: Mohammad Amin Hazbavi
- Date of birth: 6 May 2003 (age 23)
- Place of birth: Ahvaz, Iran
- Height: 1.88 m (6 ft 2 in)
- Position: Centre-back

Team information
- Current team: Sepahan
- Number: 5

Youth career
- 2018–2021: Foolad

Senior career*
Years	Team	Apps	(Gls)
2021–2023	Foolad	17	(3)
2023–2024	Al Sadd	19	(1)
2024–	Sepahan	46	(5)

International career^{‡}
2022	Iran U20	9	(3)
2022–2023	Iran U23	9	(1)
2024–	Iran	9	(1)
Medal record
Representing Iran
CAFA Nations Cup
Runner-up	2025 Tajikistan–Uzbekistan	Team
- * Club domestic league appearances and goals as of 1 January 2026 ‡ National team caps and goals as of 17 November 2026

Mohammad Amin Hazbavi (Persian: محمد امین حزباوی; born 6 May 2003) is an Iranian football defender who plays for Sepahan in Persian Gulf Pro League and the Iran national team.

== Club career ==
=== Foolad ===
He made his debut for Foolad in the 12th fixtures of 2021–22 Persian Gulf Pro League against Esteghlal while he was substituted in for Ayanda Patosi.

=== Al Sadd ===
Hazbavi joined QSL team Al-Sadd in the summer of 2023 on a 5-year contract. In July 2024, Al-Sadd reportedly terminated his contract after he rejected an offer from Qatar to switch nationalities to represent the Qatari national team.

=== Sepahan ===
After leaving Al-Sadd in July 2024 Hazbavi joined the Sepahan team in the Persian Gulf Pro League with a 3-year contract.

== International career ==
Hazbavi made his debut for the senior Iran national team on 21 March 2024 in a World Cup qualifier against Turkmenistan.

== Career statistics ==
=== Club ===
As of 1 January 2026

Appearances and goals by club, season and competition
Club	Season	League			Cup		Continental		Other		Total	
Club	Season	Division	Apps	Goals	Apps	Goals	Apps	Goals	Apps	Goals	Apps	Goals
Foolad	2021–22	Pro League	2	0	0	0	2	0	1	0	5	0
Foolad	2022–23	Pro League	15	3	2	1	–		–		17	4
Foolad	Total		17	3	2	1	2	0	1	0	22	4
Al Sadd	2023–24	QSL	19	1	0	0	4	0	0	0	23	1
Al Sadd	Total		19	1	0	0	4	0	0	0	23	1
Sepahan	2024–25	Persian Gulf Pro League	19	3	1	0	6	1	0	0	26	4
Sepahan	2025–26	Persian Gulf Pro League	13	2	0	0	4	1	–	–	17	2
Sepahan	Total		32	5	1	0	10	2	0	0	43	7
Career total			68	9	3	1	16	2	1	0	88	12

=== International ===
As of match played 17 November 2026

Appearances and goals by national team and year
National team	Year	Apps	Goals
Iran	2024	3	0
Iran	2025	4	0
Iran	2026	2	1
Total		9	1

Scores and results list Iran's goal tally first.

#	Date	Venue	Opponent	Score	Result	Competition
1.	17 November 2026	Basra International Stadium, Basra, Iraq	Iraq	1–1	1–1	2026 Basra International Tournament
