= Omar Salah (footballer, born 2003) =

Jordanian footballer (born 2003)

Personal information
- Full name: Omar Salah Mohammad Al-Osad
- Date of birth: 18 April 2003 (age 23)
- Place of birth: Jordan
- Height: 1.74 m (5 ft 9 in)
- Position: Midfielder

Team information
- Current team: Al-Wakrah
- Number: 6

Youth career
- –2023: Al-Wehdat

Senior career*
Years	Team	Apps	(Gls)
2023	Al-Wehdat		
2023–	Al-Wakrah	49	(0)

International career^{‡}
2021	Jordan U18	3	(0)
2022–2023	Jordan U20	8	(1)
2023–	Jordan U23	5	(0)
- * Club domestic league appearances and goals as of 17 January 2026 ‡ National team caps and goals as of 26 March 2024

Omar Salah Mohammad Al-Osad (Arabic: عمر صلاح محمد العصاد; born 18 April 2003), commonly known as Omar Salah (Arabic: عمر صلاح), is a Jordanian professional footballer who plays as a midfielder for Qatar Stars League club Al-Wakrah.

== Club career ==
=== Al-Wehdat ===
Born in Jordan, Salah is a youth product of Al-Wehdat. He was promoted to the senior team on 28 August 2022, under manager Didier Gomes. After impressing with the club, he began attracting offers from Al-Hussein and Al-Faisaly. He would also attract offers from Qatar and later agree on a deal to sign with Al-Wakrah. Salah would reject the local offers out of respect to Al-Wehdat.

=== Al-Wakrah ===
On 19 June 2023, Qatar Stars League club Al-Wakrah purchased Salah from Al-Wehdat for $140 thousand, with Salah signing a one-year contract in the process. He was announced as a signing the following month. He was noted for having a successful season with the club, winning the 2024 Qatar Cup in the process.

On 9 June 2024, Salah signed a 5-year extension with the club. On 31 August 2024, Salah would record a hat-trick for Al-Wakrah, during a Qatari Stars Cup match against Al-Khor.

== International career ==
Salah is a youth international for Jordan, having first represented the Jordanian under-18 team.

On 26 December 2023, it was reported that Al-Wakrah did not permit Salah from joining the Jordan national under-23 football team. By 10 April 2024, the Jordan Football Association were waiting for a response from Al-Wakrah regarding Salah's participation in the 2024 AFC U-23 Asian Cup. Al-Wakrah would later explain that his absence was due to him being a key player for the club.

On August 24, the Jordan Football Association issued a statement regarding Salah's absence with the Jordan national football team, alleging that he rejected a call-up to the senior team.

== Playing style ==
Salah is described as a player known for his high technical abilities and his vision inside the box.
