= Abdelrahman Raafat =

Egyptian footballer (born 2002)

Abdelrahman Raafat عبد الرحمن رأفت
Personal information
- Full name: Abdelrahman Raafat Zaky
- Date of birth: 8 September 2002 (age 24)
- Place of birth: Egypt
- Position: Midfielder

Team information
- Current team: Al-Khor (on loan from Al-Wakrah)
- Number: 19

Youth career
- Umm Salal

Senior career*
Years	Team	Apps	(Gls)
2020–2025	Umm Salal	38	(1)
2025–2026	Al-Duhail	0	(0)
2026–	Al-Wakrah	0	(0)
2026–	→ Al-Khor (loan)	0	(0)
- * Club domestic league appearances and goals

Abdelrahman Raafat Zaky (Arabic: عبد الرحمن رأفت زكي; born 8 September 2002) is a Qatari professional footballer who plays for Al-Khor, on loan from Al-Wakrah as a midfielder.

== Career ==
Abdelrahman started his career at the youth team of Umm Salal and represented the club at every level.

== Career statistics ==
=== Club ===
As of 24 December 2020.

Club	Season	League			Cup		Continental		Other		Total	
Club	Season	Division	Apps	Goals	Apps	Goals	Apps	Goals	Apps	Goals	Apps	Goals
Umm Salal	2020–21	Pro League	4	0	4	0	0	0	—		8	0
Career totals			4	0	4	0	0	0	0	0	8	0
