= 2024 Amir of Qatar Cup =

Amir Cup 2024 (Qatar)
Tournament details
- Country: Qatar
- Dates: 26 April – 24 May 2024
- Teams: 20

Final positions
- Champions: Al Sadd
- Runners-up: Qatar SC

Tournament statistics
- Matches played: 18
- Goals scored: 71 (3.94 per match)

The 2024 Amir of Qatar Cup (named Amir Cup since 2019) is the 52nd edition of the Qatari cup tournament in men's football. It is played by the first and second level divisions of the Qatari football league structure. Al-Arabi are the defending champions. The winners were assured a place in the 2025–26 AFC Champions League Elite.

== Preliminary Round ==
26 April 2024	Al-Khor SC	2–1	Lusail	Al Wakrah
17:15 AST (UTC+3)		Report		Stadium: Saoud bin Abdulrahman Stadium

26 April 2024	Al-Shahania	0–1	Al Bidda SC	Al-Rayyan
20:00 AST (UTC+3)		Report		Stadium: Grand Hamad Stadium

27 April 2024	Al-Mesaimeer	2–3	Al-Waab	Al Wakrah
17:15 AST (UTC+3)		Report		Stadium: Saoud bin Abdulrahman Stadium

27 April 2024	Al Kharaitiyat	0–1	Al-Sailiya	Doha
20:00 AST (UTC+3)		Report		Stadium: Thani bin Jassim Stadium

== Main Bracket ==
=== Bracket ===
Round of 16
7 May – Doha (JBHS)
Qatar SC	2
Al-Waab	0
9 May – Al Wakrah
Al-Rayyan	4
Al-Khor SC	1
7 May – Doha (ABKS)
Umm Salal (a.e.t.)	3
Al Bidda SC	1
8 May – Al Rayyan (ABAS)
Al-Gharafa (a.e.t.)	4
Al-Ahli	3
6 May – Al Wakrah
Al-Duhail	3
Al-Shamal	1
6 May – Al Rayyan (ABAS)
Al-Arabi	2
Al-Sailiya	1
9 May – Doha (JBHS)
Al-Wakrah (p)	3 (5)
Muaither	3 (4)
9 May – Doha (ABKS)
Al-Sadd	3
Al-Markhiya	2

Quarter-finals
14 May – Doha (JBHS)
Qatar SC (p)	4 (5)
Al-Rayyan	4 (4)
14 May – Doha (ABKS)
Umm Salal	2
Al-Gharafa	4
13 May – Al Wakrah
Al-Duhail	3
Al-Arabi	2
13 May – Al Rayyan (ABAS)
Al-Wakrah	0
Al-Sadd	1

Semi-finals
19 May – Al Wakrah
Qatar SC	2 (4)
Al-Gharafa	2 (3)
18 May – Al Rayyan (ABAS)
Al-Duhail	0
Al-Sadd	1

Final
24 May – Al Rayyan (ECS)
Qatar SC	0
Al-Sadd	1

=== Round of 16 ===
6 May 2024	Al-Duhail	3–1	Al-Shamal	Al Wakrah
17:15 AST (UTC+3)		Report		Stadium: Al Janoub Stadium

6 May 2024	Al-Arabi	2–1	Al-Sailiya	Al Rayyan
20:00 AST (UTC+3)		Report		Stadium: Ahmad bin Ali Stadium

7 May 2024	Qatar SC	2–0	Al-Waab	Al Rayyan
17:15 AST (UTC+3)		Report		Stadium: Jassim Bin Hamad Stadium

7 May 2024	Umm Salal	3–1 (a.e.t.)	Al Bidda SC	Doha
20:00 AST (UTC+3)		Report		Stadium: Abdullah bin Khalifa Stadium

8 May 2024	Al-Gharafa	4–3 (a.e.t.)	Al-Ahli	Al Rayyan
17:15 AST (UTC+3)		Report		Stadium: Ahmad bin Ali Stadium

9 May 2024	Al-Sadd	3–2	Al-Markhiya	Doha
17:15 AST (UTC+3)		Report		Stadium: Abdullah bin Khalifa Stadium

9 May 2024	Al-Wakrah	3–3 (a.e.t.) (5–4 p)	Muaither	Al Rayyan
20:00 AST (UTC+3)		Report		Stadium: Jassim Bin Hamad Stadium

9 May 2024	Al-Rayyan	4–1	Al-Khor SC	Al Wakrah
20:00 AST (UTC+3)		Report		Stadium: Al Janoub Stadium

=== Quarter-finals ===
13 May 2024	Al-Duhail	3–2	Al-Arabi	Al Wakrah
17:15 AST (UTC+3)	Olunga 8', 59'; Coutinho 25'	Report	Msakni 3', 10'	Stadium: Al Janoub Stadium

13 May 2024	Al-Wakrah	0–1	Al-Sadd	Al Rayyan
20:00 AST (UTC+3)		Report	Bounedjah 20'	Stadium: Ahmad bin Ali Stadium

14 May 2024	Umm Salal	2–4	Al-Gharafa	Doha
17:15 AST (UTC+3)		Report		Stadium: Abdullah bin Khalifa Stadium

14 May 2024	Qatar SC	v (a.e.t.) (5–4 p)	Al-Rayyan	Al Rayyan
20:00 AST (UTC+3)		Report		Stadium: Jassim Bin Hamad Stadium

=== Semi-finals ===
18 May 2024	Al-Duhail	0–1	Al-Sadd	Al Wakrah
19:00 AST (UTC+3)		Report	Afif 46'	Stadium: Al Janoub Stadium

19 May 2024	Qatar SC	2–2 (a.e.t.) (4–3 p)	Al-Gharafa	Al Rayyan
19:00 AST (UTC+3)		Report		Stadium: Ahmad bin Ali Stadium

=== Final ===
24 May 2024	Al-Sadd	1–0 (a.e.t.)	Qatar SC	Al Rayyan
19:00 AST (UTC+3)	Uribe 118'			Stadium: Education City Stadium; Referee: Salman Ahmad Falahi
