= Al-Wakrah SC =

Association football club in Qatar

Al-Wakrah
- Full name: Al-Wakrah Sports Club
- Nicknames: The Blue Waves; The Sailor
- Founded: 1959; 67 years ago
- Ground: Al Janoub Stadium
- Capacity: 44,325
- Chairman: Sheikh Khalifa bin Hassan
- Head coach: José Luis Sierra
- League: Qatar Stars League
- 2025–26: Qatari Stars League, 8th of 12
- Website: alwakrahsc.qa
| Home colours | Away colours | Third colours |

Al-Wakrah Sport Club (Arabic: نادي الوكرة الرياضي) is a Qatari multi-sports club based in the city of Al Wakrah. Their professional football team competes in the Qatar Stars League. They play their home games at the Al Janoub Stadium.

== Name history ==
- 1959: Founded as Al-Wakrah Youth Club
- 1967: Changed name to Al-Wakrah Sports Club

== History ==
Interior of Al Janoub Stadium

Al Wakrah was founded in 1959, and was officially legitimized in 1965 under the name of Al Wakrah Youth Club. From that time, its football and handball sections were formed, with both participating in local competitions. It changed its name to Al Wakrah Sports Club in 1967. Over the years, it branched out to many sports, including chess, basketball, and bowling.

The original club headquarters at Al Wakrah Stadium was constructed in 1984, and tennis and squash teams were also formed during this time in addition to its previously formed sports teams. They won the Qatari league twice, in 1999 and 2001.

The new club headquarters is Al Janoub Stadium, inaugurated in 2019 as one of the FIFA World Cup 2022 Qatar sites and was designed by Zaha Hadid.

== Fan base ==
A fan group Instagram account dedicated to the club's supporters was created in 2022 and was popularised during the World Cup as Argentine fans shared the club's colors and decided to support the club during its matches.

== Honours ==
- Qatar Stars League
  - Winners (2): 1998–99, 2000–01
- Qatar Cup
  - Winners (2): 1999, 2024
- Qatar Sheikh Jassem Cup
  - Winners (4): 1989, 1991, 1998, 2004
- Qatari Stars Cup
  - Winners (1): 2011
- Qatari Second Division
  - Winners (2): 1984–85, 2018–19

== Players ==
As of Qatar Stars League:

Note: Flags indicate national team as defined under FIFA eligibility rules; some limited exceptions apply. Players may hold more than one non-FIFA nationality.

| No. | Pos. | Nation | Player |
|---|---|---|---|
| 1 | GK | QAT | Mohammed Al-Bakri |
| 2 | DF | QAT | Lucas Mendes |
| 3 | DF | URU | Paolo Calione (on loan from Nacional) |
| 4 | MF | QAT | Abdullah Al-Saei |
| 5 | MF | QAT | Ahmed Fadhel |
| 6 | MF | JOR | Omar Salah |
| 7 | MF | MAR | Ayoub Assal |
| 8 | MF | EGY | Hamdy Fathy |
| 9 | FW | QAT | Tameem Al-Abdullah |
| 10 | FW | ANG | Gelson Dala |
| 11 | FW | ALG | Redouane Berkane |
| 12 | DF | QAT | Murad Naji |
| 14 | MF | QAT | Abdelrahman Raafat |
| 15 | DF | QAT | Al-Mahdi Ali Mukhtar |

| No. | Pos. | Nation | Player |
|---|---|---|---|
| 16 | DF | QAT | Nabil Irfan |
| 17 | MF | QAT | Rabh Boussafi |
| 18 | FW | ESP | Luis Alberto |
| 20 | MF | QAT | Nasser Al Yazidi |
| 21 | FW | QAT | Khalid Muneer |
| 22 | GK | EGY | Yousef Ramadan |
| 26 | MF | QAT | Abdollah Ali Saei |
| 28 | DF | QAT | Yousef El-Khatib |
| 66 | DF | ESP | Simo (on loan from Al-Rayyan) |
| 75 | MF | MAR | Amin Zahzouh |
| 89 | GK | QAT | Abdulaziz Othman |
| 93 | MF | TUN | Aïssa Laïdouni |
| 99 | GK | QAT | Omair Al-Sayed |

=== Out on loan ===
Note: Flags indicate national team as defined under FIFA eligibility rules; some limited exceptions apply. Players may hold more than one non-FIFA nationality.

| No. / Pos. / Nation / Player; — / MF / ALG / Massil Adjaoudi (at Al-Bidda) | No. / Pos. / Nation / Player; — / FW / QAT / Mohamed Khaled Hassan (at Lusail) |

== Records and statistics ==
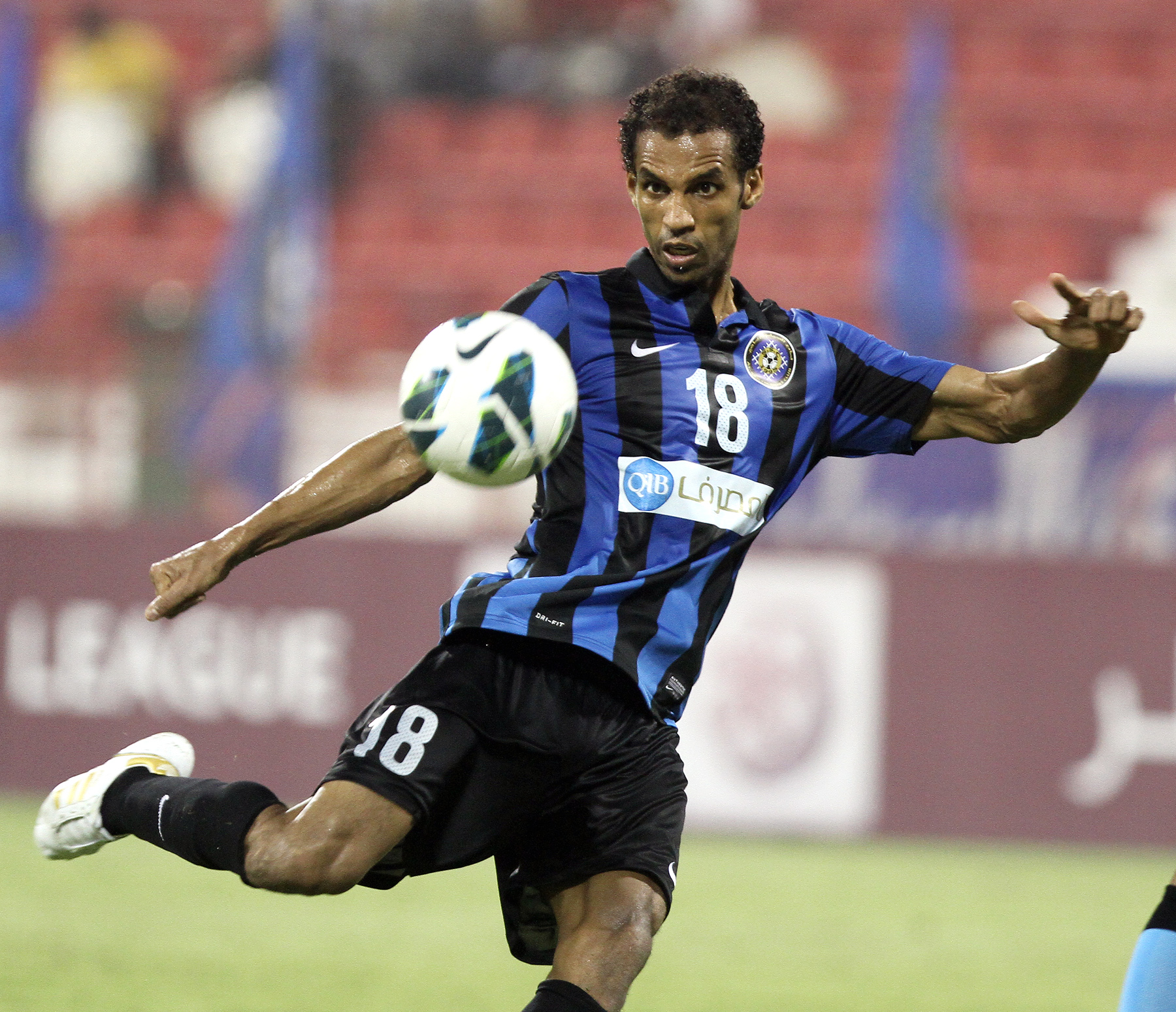
Mirghani Al Zain holds the club record for league goals scored

Last update: 23 February 2012.
Apps and goals in the QSL only

Most goals
| # | Nat. | Name | League Goals |
|---|---|---|---|
| 1 | (Qatar) | Mirghani Al Zain | 53 |
| 2 | (Morocco) | Adil Ramzi | 47 |
| 3 | (Qatar) | Ali Mejbel Fartoos | 24 |
| 4 | (Qatar) | Mansoor Muftah | 19 |
| 5 | (Morocco) | Ali Boussaboun | 18 |

Most caps
| # | Nat. | Name | League Caps |
|---|---|---|---|
| 1 | (Qatar) | Turki Aman | 249 |
| 2 | (Qatar) | Mirghani Al Zain | 242 |
| 3 | (Qatar) | Nayef Al Khater | 218 |
| 4 | (Qatar) | Ali Qassim | 183 |
| 5 | (Qatar) | Mohammed Enyas | 169 |

== Club staff ==
| Position | Name |
|---|---|
| Head coach | (Chile) José Luis Sierra |
| Assistant coach | (Chile) Luis Jiménez |
| Goalkeeper coach | (Tunisia) Radhouane Salhi |
| Fitness coach | (Spain) Dani Pastor |
| Chief analyst & Head of scouting | (Spain) Sergio Márquez |
| Match analyst | (Spain) Ramón Alturo |
| Technical Assistant | (Colombia) Luís Piedrahita |
| Team manager | (Qatar) Ali Al-Marri |
| Doctor | (Qatar) Mohammed Al-Muhaza |
| Physiotherapist | (Qatar) Tameem Hassan (Spain) Christian Castilla |
| Medicaltherapist | (Qatar) Nasser Al-Zarra |
| Technical director | (Qatar) Abdulrahman Suhail |

== Managerial history ==
As of 24 May 2012

- (Sudan) Ashour Salem (c. 1970s)
- (Egypt) Mamdouh Khafaji (c. 1980s)
- (Qatar) Hassan Ali Sheeb (1985)
- (England) Len Ashurst (1988–89)
- (Brazil) Alcides Romano Junior (1989)
- (Qatar) Hassan Ali Sheeb (1989)
- (Brazil) Flamarion Nunes (1989–91)
- (Romania) Costică Ştefănescu (1991–92)
- (England) Len Ashurst (1993–95)
- (Qatar) Khalifa Khamis (1995)
- (Brazil) José Paulo Rubim (1995)
- (Iraq) Adnan Dirjal (1995–98)
- (Algeria) Rabah Madjer (1998–99)
- (Croatia) Ivan Buljan (1999)
- (Iraq) Adnan Dirjal (1999–00)
- (Brazil) José Paulo Rubim (2000–01)
- (France) Paul Dolezar (2001)
- (Iraq) Mejbel Fartous (2001–02)
- (Serbia) Nebojsa Vučković (2002–03)
- (Bosnia and Herzegovina) Džemal Hadžiabdić (1 July 2003–30 June 2004)
- (Iraq) Adnan Dirjal (2004–Dec 05)
- (Netherlands) Frank Tyson & (Qatar) Mohammed Al Shaibani (CT) (Dec 2005–Jan 06)
- (Qatar) Saeed al-Misnad (Jan 06)
- (Morocco) Hassan Hormutallah (Jan 2006–06)
- (Bosnia and Herzegovina) Mehmed Baždarević (1 July 2006–30 June 2007)
- (Iraq) Adnan Dirjal (2007)
- (Morocco) Mustapha Madih (2007)
- (Germany) Reiner Hollmann (2007)
- (Iraq) Mejbel Fartous (2007)
- (France) Richard Tardy (2007–08)
- (Canada) Goran Miscević (2008)
- (Iraq) Adnan Dirjal (2008)
- (Morocco) Mustapha Madih (Jul 2008–Jun, 2010)
- (Iraq) Adnan Dirjal (1 Oct 2010–9 June 2012)
- (Bosnia and Herzegovina) Mehmed Baždarević (10 June 2012–3 June 2013)
- (Iraq) Adnan Dirjal (8 May 2013–12 March 2014)
- (Tunisia) Maher Kanzari (1 June 2014–28 Oct 2014)
- (Algeria) Noureddine Zekri (28 Oct 2014–20 Feb, 2015)
- (Serbia) Goran Tufegdžić (22 Feb 2015–Jun 2015)
- (Uruguay) Mauricio Larriera (Jul 2015–Nov 2016)
- (Tunisia) Kais Yâakoubi ( Nov 2016–Jun 2017
- (Spain) Tintín Márquez (Jan 2018–Dec 2023)
- (Spain) José Murcia (Dec 2023–Apr 2024)
- (Qatar) Ali Rahma Al-Marri (Apr 2024– )

== Individual honours ==
2009 FIFA Confederations Cup

The following players have played in the FIFA Confederations Cup:
- (Iraq) 2009 – Karrar Jassim
- (Iraq) 2009 – Ali Rehema

== Performance in AFC competitions ==
- Asian Club Championship: 2 appearances

2001: First Round
2002: First Round
