= 2019–20 Qatar Stars League =

56th season of top-tier football league in Qatar

Qatar Stars League
- Season: 2019–20
- Dates: 21 August 2019 – 21 August 2020
- Champions: Al Duhail (7th title)
- Relegated: Al Shahaniya
- Champions League: Al Duhail; Al-Rayyan
- FIFA Club World Cup: Al Duhail
- Matches: 126
- Goals: 344 (2.73 per match)
- Top goalscorer: Akram Afif (15 goals)
- Best goalkeeper: Fahad Younes
- Biggest home win: Al-Rayyan 5–0 Qatar SC (19 October 2019)
- Biggest away win: Al Shahaniya 1–7 Al Sadd (31 August 2019)
- Highest scoring: Al Shahaniya 1–7 Al Sadd (31 August 2019)
- Longest winning run: Al Duhail (8 matches)
- Longest unbeaten run: Al Duhail (13 matches)
- Longest winless run: Al Shahaniya (11 matches)
- Longest losing run: Umm Salal (6 matches)
- All statistics correct as of 21 August 2020.

The 2019–20 Qatari League, also known as the Qatar Stars League or QNB Stars League for sponsorship reasons, was the 47th edition of top-level football championship in Qatar. Al Sadd were the defending champions.

The league was halted on 16 March 2020 due to the COVID-19 pandemic in Qatar, then later resumed on 24 July 2020.

== Teams ==
=== Stadia and locations ===
Club	City/Town	Stadium
Al Ahli	Doha	Hamad bin Khalifa Stadium
Al-Arabi	Doha	Grand Hamad Stadium
Al Duhail	Doha	Abdullah bin Khalifa Stadium
Al-Gharafa	Doha	Thani bin Jassim Stadium
Al-Khor	Al Khor	Al-Khor SC Stadium
Al-Rayyan	Al-Rayyan	Ahmed bin Ali Stadium
Al Sadd	Doha	Jassim Bin Hamad Stadium
Al-Sailiya	Doha	Hamad bin Khalifa Stadium
Al Shahaniya	Al-Shahaniya	Ahmed bin Ali Stadium
Al-Wakrah	Al Wakrah	Al-Wakrah Stadium
Qatar SC	Doha	Hamad bin Suhaim Al Thani
Umm Salal	Doha	Suheim Bin Hamad Stadium

=== Personnel and kits ===
Club	Head coach	Captain	Kit manufacturer	Shirt sponsor
Al Ahli	(Montenegro) Nebojša Jovović	(Morocco) Nabil El Zhar	Jako	Regency Group Holding
Al-Arabi	(Iceland) Heimir Hallgrímsson	(Qatar) Ahmed Fatehi	Puma	N/A
Al Duhail	(Morocco) Walid Regragui	(Qatar) Karim Boudiaf	Puma	Mashraf Al Rayan
Al-Gharafa	(Serbia) Slaviša Jokanović	(Qatar) Qasem Burhan	Erreà	N/A
Al-Khor	(Morocco) Omar Najhi	(Qatar) Naif Mubarak	Macron	N/A
Al-Rayyan	(Uruguay) Diego Aguirre	(Qatar) Rodrigo Tabata	Nike	QIC
Al Sadd	(Spain) Xavi	(Spain) Gabi	Puma	Qatar Airways
Al-Sailiya	(Tunisia) Sami Trabelsi	(Qatar) Majdi Siddiq	Adidas	UCC Holding; Qatar Islamic Bank
Al Shahaniya	(Qatar) Nabil Anwar	(Spain) Álvaro Mejía	Adidas	N/A
Al-Wakrah	(Spain) Tintín Márquez	(Brazil) Bruno Uvini	Jako	N/A
Qatar SC	(Qatar) Wesam Rizik	(Spain) Álex Gálvez	Puma	N/A
Umm Salal	(Morocco) Aziz Ben Askar	(Syria) Mahmoud Al-Mawas	Jako	N/A

=== Managerial changes ===
Team	Outgoing manager	Manner of departure	Date of vacancy	Position in table	Incoming manager	Date of appointment
Qatar SC	(Spain) Carlos Alós	Sacked	23 September 2019	11th	(Qatar) Wesam Rizik	
Umm Salal	(Spain) Raúl Caneda	Sacked	24 October 2019	11th	(Morocco) Aziz Ben Askar	
Al Ahli	(Spain) Rubén de la Barrera	Sacked	1 December 2019	7th	(Montenegro) Nebojša Jovović	
Al Duhail	(Portugal) Rui Faria	Resigned	20 January 2020	1st	(Morocco) Walid Regragui	
Al Shahaniya	(Spain) José Murcia	Sacked	9 June 2020	12th	(Qatar) Nabil Anwar	

=== Foreign players ===
Club	Player 1	Player 2	Player 3	AFC player	UAFA player	Former players
Al Ahli	(Morocco) Nabil El Zhar	(Paraguay) Hernán Pérez	(Senegal) Mohamed Diamé	(Australia) Shane Lowry	(Tunisia) Ahmed Akaïchi	(Uruguay) Abel Hernández
Al-Arabi	(Germany) Pierre-Michel Lasogga	(Iceland) Aron Gunnarsson	(Spain) Marc Muniesa	(Iran) Morteza Pouraliganji	(Tunisia) Hamdi Harbaoui	(Iceland) Birkir Bjarnason
Al Duhail	(Belgium) Edmilson Junior	(Morocco) Medhi Benatia		(North Korea) Han Kwang-song	(Tunisia) Youssef Msakni	(Croatia) Mario Mandžukić (Iraq) Mohanad Ali
Al-Gharafa	(Algeria) Adlène Guedioura	(Ivory Coast) Jonathan Kodjia	(Mexico) Héctor Moreno	(South Korea) Koo Ja-cheol	(Algeria) Sofiane Hanni	(Slovakia) Vladimír Weiss
Al-Khor	(Brazil) Lucca	(Brazil) Tiago Bezerra	(Madagascar) Ibrahim Amada	(Lebanon) Alexander Michel Melki	(Morocco) Ahmed Hammoudan	(Brazil) Wágner
Al-Rayyan	(Argentina) Gabriel Mercado	(Cameroon) Franck Kom	(Ivory Coast) Yohan Boli	(South Korea) Lee Jae-ik	(Algeria) Yacine Brahimi	
Al Sadd	(South Korea) Jung Woo-young			(South Korea) Nam Tae-hee	(Algeria) Baghdad Bounedjah	(Mexico) Marco Fabián (Spain) Gabi
Al-Sailiya	(Algeria) Nadir Belhadj	(Senegal) Kara Mbodji		(Iran) Karim Ansarifard	(Jordan) Mohammad Abu Zrayq	(Morocco) Mbark Boussoufa (Tunisia) Bilel Saidani
Al Shahaniya	(Ivory Coast) Jean-Paul Késsé Amangoua	(Netherlands) Nigel de Jong	(Spain) Álvaro Mejía	(Iran) Ramin Rezaeian	(Oman) Jameel Al-Yahmadi	(Morocco) Abdelaziz Barrada (Tunisia) Ahmed Akaïchi
Al-Wakrah	(Brazil) Lucas Mendes	(Mali) Ousmane Coulibaly	(Spain) Cristian Ceballos	(Spain) Isaías^{1}	(Algeria) Mohamed Benyettou	(Brazil) Bruno Uvini (Morocco) Iliass Bel Hassani
Qatar SC	(Brazil) Kayke	(Netherlands) Abdenasser El Khayati	(Spain) Álex Gálvez	(Uzbekistan) Sardor Rashidov	(Morocco) Mehdi Berrahma	(Democratic Republic of the Congo) Junior Kabananga
Umm Salal	(Algeria) Ayoub Azzi	(Argentina) Raúl Becerra	(Bosnia and Herzegovina) Enes Sipović	(Syria) Mahmoud Al-Mawas	(Algeria) Walid Mesloub	(Brazil) João Victor (Brazil) Magno Cruz (Ivory Coast) Yannick Sagbo (Morocco) Adil Rhaili (Spain) Víctor Vázquez

^1 Isaías has Australian citizenship and was counted as Asian player.

== League table ==
Pos	Team	Pld	W	D	L	GF	GA	GD	Pts	Qualification or relegation
1	Al Duhail (C)	22	16	4	2	38	16	+22	52	Qualification for AFC Champions League group stage and FIFA Club World Cup first round
2	Al-Rayyan	22	15	6	1	40	15	+25	51	Qualification for AFC Champions League group stage
3	Al Sadd (Note: Al Sadd qualified for the AFC Champions League group stage as Emir of Qatar Cup winners.)	22	14	3	5	51	29	+22	45	Qualification for AFC Champions League group stage
4	Al-Gharafa	22	10	6	6	34	29	+5	36	Qualification for AFC Champions League play-off round
5	Al-Sailiya	22	8	5	9	22	25	−3	29	
6	Al-Wakrah	22	7	6	9	28	31	−3	27	
7	Al-Arabi	22	6	8	8	28	28	0	26	
8	Qatar SC	22	4	8	10	18	26	−8	20	
9	Al Ahli	22	5	5	12	23	35	−12	20	
10	Umm Salal	22	3	9	10	18	37	−19	18	
11	Al-Khor (O)	22	3	8	11	23	33	−10	17	Qualification for relegation play-off
12	Al Shahaniya (R)	22	2	10	10	22	41	−19	16	Relegation to Qatargas League

Source: QSL
Rules for classification: 1) Points; 2) Goal difference; 3) Number of goals scored;
(C) Champions; (O) Play-off winners; (R) Relegated

== Results ==
Home \ Away	AHL	ARA	DUH	GHA	KHO	RAY	SAD	SAI	SHA	WAK	QAT	UMM
Al Ahli	—	0–3	0–3	1–1	2–2	1–3	0–1	3–0	2–2	0–1	2–2	1–0
Al-Arabi	3–1	—	1–3	0–1	1–0	1–2	1–6	1–2	2–1	2–2	0–0	1–1
Al Duhail	1–0	1–1	—	2–1	1–0	1–1	4–1	2–1	3–1	1–0	0–0	1–1
Al-Gharafa	3–1	1–0	0–2	—	2–2	4–2	1–5	1–3	3–0	2–1	0–0	2–0
Al-Khor	2–3	1–3	2–3	1–3	—	1–1	1–2	2–1	2–2	1–1	2–0	1–0
Al-Rayyan	1–0	0–0	1–0	0–0	2–0	—	1–0	1–0	2–2	1–0	5–0	2–2
Al Sadd	2–1	1–1	1–0	1–1	2–1	2–4	—	3–0	4–2	4–1	0–3	2–1
Al-Sailiya	0–1	1–0	1–2	2–0	1–1	0–2	1–3	—	2–2	3–1	1–0	0–0
Al Shahaniya	3–1	0–0	0–1	2–1	2–2	0–1	1–7	0–0	—	0–2	0–0	1–1
Al-Wakrah	2–1	2–1	2–4	3–3	0–0	0–2	2–1	0–0	4–1	—	2–0	1–2
Qatar SC	0–2	1–1	1–2	1–3	2–1	1–2	0–1	0–1	1–0	0–0	—	1–1
Umm Salal	1–1	1–5	0–1	0–1	1–0	0–4	2–2	0–2	2–2	2–1	0–5	—

Updated to match(es) played on 21 August 2020. Source: Qatar Soccer League
Legend: Blue = home team win; Yellow = draw; Red = away team win.

=== Positions by round ===
Leader : 2021 AFC Champions League Group stage
2021 AFC Champions League group stage
2021 AFC Champions League qualifying play-off
Qualification to Relegation play-off
Relegation to 2020–21 Qatargas League

Team ╲ Round	1	2	3	4	5	6	7	8	9	10	11	12	13	14	15	16	17	18	19	20	21	22
Al Duhail	4	4	6	2	2	1	1	1	1	1	1	1	1	1	1	1	1	1	1	1	1	1
Al-Rayyan	5	8	8	5	5	2	2	2	2	2	2	2	2	2	2	2	2	2	2	2	2	2
Al Sadd	1	1	3	1	1	3	4	4	4	4	3	3	3	3	3	3	3	3	3	3	3	3
Al-Gharafa	2	2	2	3	4	5	3	3	3	3	4	4	4	4	4	4	4	4	4	4	4	4
Al-Sailiya	7	10	9	9	6	8	7	6	7	6	6	6	6	7	6	5	6	6	6	6	5	5
Al-Wakrah	11	7	5	7	8	7	8	8	8	8	9	7	7	6	7	7	7	7	7	7	6	6
Al-Arabi	3	3	1	4	3	4	5	5	5	5	5	5	5	5	5	6	5	5	5	5	7	7
Qatar SC	9	11	11	11	11	11	11	9	9	9	7	8	9	9	9	9	9	9	9	9	9	8
Al Ahli	10	6	4	6	7	6	6	7	6	7	8	9	8	8	8	8	8	8	8	8	8	9
Umm Salal	6	9	10	10	10	9	10	11	11	11	12	12	12	11	11	11	11	10	10	10	10	10
Al-Khor	8	5	7	8	9	10	9	10	10	10	10	10	10	10	10	10	10	11	11	11	11	11
Al Shahaniya	12	12	12	12	12	12	12	12	12	12	11	11	11	12	12	12	12	12	12	12	12	12

Updated to match(es) played on 21 August 2020. Source: QSL

== Relegation play-off ==
28 August 2020
18:30

Al-Khor	2–0	Al-Markhiya
Hammoudan 99'; Murisi 112'

Al Janoub Stadium
Referee: Khamis Mohamed Al Kuwari

== Statistics ==
=== Top scorers ===
Rank	Player	Club	Goals
1	(Algeria) Yacine Brahimi	Al-Rayyan	15
1	(Qatar) Akram Afif	Al Sadd	15
3	(Algeria) Baghdad Bounedjah	Al Sadd	13
3	(Iran) Ramin Rezaeian	Al Shahaniya	13
5	(Algeria) Mohamed Benyettou	Al-Wakrah	11
5	(Algeria) Sofiane Hanni	Al-Gharafa	11
7	(Tunisia) Hamdi Harbaoui	Al-Arabi	10
8	(Brazil) Tiago Bezerra	Al-Khor	9
8	(Qatar) Ahmed Alaaeldin	Al-Gharafa	9
10	(Qatar) Hassan Al-Haydos	Al Sadd	8
10	(Qatar) Mohammed Muntari	Al Duhail	8

=== Hat-tricks ===
Player	For	Against	Result	Date	Ref
(Algeria) Baghdad Bounedjah	Al Sadd	Al Shahaniya	7–1	31 August 2019	
(Qatar) Akram Afif	Al Sadd	Al-Gharafa	5–1	23 December 2019	
(Algeria) Yacine Brahimi	Al-Rayyan	Umm Salal	4–0	3 January 2020	
(Ivory Coast) Jonathan Kodjia	Al-Gharafa	Al-Rayyan	4–2	23 January 2020	
(Qatar) Akram Afif	Al Sadd	Al-Sailiya	3–0	1 February 2020	

=== Clean sheets ===
Rank	Player	Club	Clean sheets
1	(Qatar) Fahad Younes	Al-Rayyan	13
2	(Qatar) Amine Lecomte	Al Duhail (4) Al-Sailiya (3)	7
2	(Qatar) Jassem Adel	Qatar SC	7
4	(Qatar) Qasem Burhan	Al-Gharafa	6
5	(Qatar) Khalifa Ababacar	Al-Sailiya	5
5	(Qatar) Mohammed Al-Bakri	Al Shahaniya (1) Al Duhail (4)	5
5	(Qatar) Saoud Al Khater	Al-Wakrah	5
8	(Brazil) Ivanildo	Al Ahli	4
8	(Qatar) Mahmud Abunada	Al-Arabi	4
10	(Qatar) Saad Al-Sheeb	Al Sadd	3
11	(Qatar) Baba Malick	Umm Salal	2
11	(Qatar) Ebrahim Daryoush	Al Shahaniya	2
11	(Senegal) Papa Djibril	Al-Khor	2
14	(France) Grégory Gomis	Al-Arabi	1
14	(Qatar) Meshaal Barsham	Al Sadd	1
14	(Qatar) Moatasem Bostami	Qatar SC	1
14	(Qatar) Rajab Hamza	Al-Khor	1
14	(Qatar) Salah Zakaria	Al-Gharafa	1
14	(Senegal) Hassan Idriss Dicko	Al-Wakrah	1

=== Team of the Year ===
No	Position	Nat.	Player	Club	Ref.
1	Goalkeeper	(Qatar)	Fahad Younes	Al-Rayyan	
2	Defender	(Qatar)	Ró-Ró	Al Sadd	
3	Defender	(Qatar)	Boualem Khoukhi	Al Sadd	
4	Defender	(Qatar)	Ahmed Yasser	Al Duhail	
5	Defender	(Qatar)	Abdelkarim Hassan	Al Sadd	
6	Midfielder	(Qatar)	Karim Boudiaf	Al Duhail	
7	Midfielder	(Cameroon)	Franck Kom	Al-Rayyan	
8	Midfielder	(Qatar)	Abdulaziz Hatem	Al-Rayyan	
9	Midfielder	(Algeria)	Yacine Brahimi	Al-Rayyan	
10	Forward	(Qatar)	Akram Afif	Al Sadd	
11	Forward	(Algeria)	Baghdad Bounedjah	Al Sadd	
