= 2020–21 Qatar Stars League =

57th season of top-tier football league in Qatar

Qatar Stars League
- Season: 2020–2021
- Dates: 3 September 2020 – 10 April 2021
- Champions: Al Sadd (15th title)
- Relegated: Al Kharaitiyat
- Champions League: Al Sadd; Al Duhail
- Champions League Play-off round: Al-Rayyan
- Matches: 132
- Goals: 376 (2.85 per match)
- Top goalscorer: Baghdad Bounedjah (21 goals)
- Best goalkeeper: Ivanildo
- Biggest home win: Al Sadd 8–0 Al-Sailiya (7 January 2021)
- Biggest away win: Al Ahli 1–7 Al Sadd (25 October 2020)
- Highest scoring: Al Duhail 8–1 Al-Wakrah (8 January 2021)
- Longest winning run: Al Sadd (7 matches)
- Longest unbeaten run: Al Sadd (22 matches)
- Longest winless run: Al Kharaitiyat (13 matches)
- Longest losing run: Al Kharaitiyat (13 matches)
- All statistics correct as of 10 April 2021.

The 2020–21 Qatari League, also known as Qatar Stars League or QNB Stars League for sponsorship reasons, was the 48th edition of top-level football championship in Qatar. Al Duhail were the defending champions.

Al Sadd won the league title for a record 15th time, without suffering a defeat during the entire campaign.

== Teams ==
=== Stadia and locations ===
Club	City/Town	Stadium
Al Ahli	Doha	Hamad bin Khalifa Stadium
Al-Arabi	Doha	Grand Hamad Stadium
Al Duhail	Doha	Abdullah bin Khalifa Stadium
Al-Gharafa	Doha	Thani bin Jassim Stadium
Al Kharaitiyat	Umm Salal	Al-Khor SC Stadium
Al-Khor	Al Khor	Al-Khor SC Stadium
Al-Rayyan	Al Rayyan	Ahmad bin Ali Stadium
Al Sadd	Doha	Jassim bin Hamad Stadium
Al-Sailiya	Doha	Hamad bin Khalifa Stadium
Al-Wakrah	Al Wakrah	Al-Wakrah Stadium
Qatar SC	Doha	Hamad bin Suhaim Al Thani Stadium
Umm Salal	Doha	Suheim bin Hamad Stadium

=== Personnel and kits ===
Club	Head coach	Captain	Kit manufacturer	Shirt sponsor
Al Ahli	(Montenegro) Nebojša Jovović	(Iran) Omid Ebrahimi	Puma	Regency Group Holding
Al-Arabi	(Iceland) Heimir Hallgrímsson	(Qatar) Ahmed Fathy	Puma	N/A
Al Duhail	(France) Sabri Lamouchi	(Qatar) Almoez Ali	Puma	Al Rayan Bank
Al-Gharafa	(Serbia) Slaviša Jokanović	(Qatar) Qasem Burhan	Puma	N/A
Al Kharaitiyat	(Qatar) Wesam Rizik	(Iran) Pejman Montazeri	Joma	N/A
Al-Khor	(Germany) Winfried Schäfer	(Qatar) Helal Mohammed	Adidas	N/A
Al-Rayyan	(France) Laurent Blanc	(Algeria) Yacine Brahimi	Nike	QIC
Al Sadd	(Spain) Xavi	(Qatar) Hassan Al-Haydos	Puma	Qatar Airways
Al-Sailiya	(Tunisia) Sami Trabelsi	(Qatar) Majdi Siddiq	Umbro	UCC Holding; Qatar Islamic Bank
Al-Wakrah	(Spain) Tintín Márquez	(Spain) Isaías	Umbro	N/A
Qatar SC	(Qatar) Younes Ali	(Spain) Álex Gálvez	Puma	N/A
Umm Salal	(Morocco) Aziz Ben Askar	(Qatar) Lawrence Quaye	Jako	N/A

=== Foreign players ===
- Players name in **bold** indicates the player is registered during the mid-season transfer window.
- Players in italics were out of squad or left club within the season, after pre-season transfer window, or in the mid-season transfer window, and at least had one appearance.

Club	Player 1	Player 2	Player 3	AFC Player	UAFA Player	Former players
Al Ahli	(Australia) Shane Lowry	(Paraguay) Hernán Pérez	(Senegal) Mohamed Diamé	(Iran) Omid Ebrahimi	(Morocco) Nabil El Zhar	
Al-Arabi	(Algeria) **Ayoub Azzi**	(Iceland) Aron Gunnarsson	(Spain) Marc Muniesa	(Iran) Mehrdad Mohammadi	(Tunisia) **Youssef Msakni**	(Germany) Pierre-Michel Lasogga (Iran) Mehdi Torabi (Tunisia) Hamdi Harbaoui
Al Duhail	(Belgium) Edmilson Junior	(Brazil) Dudu	(Kenya) **Michael Olunga**	(Iran) **Ali Karimi**	(Morocco) Medhi Benatia	(Iran) Ramin Rezaeian (Tunisia) Youssef Msakni
Al-Gharafa	(Algeria) Adlène Guedioura	(Ivory Coast) Jonathan Kodjia	(Ivory Coast) **Wilfried Kanon**	(South Korea) Koo Ja-cheol	(Algeria) Sofiane Hanni	(Mexico) Héctor Moreno
Al Kharaitiyat	(Ghana) Evans Mensah	(Ivory Coast) Oumar Sako	(Morocco) Rachid Tiberkanine	(Iran) Pejman Montazeri	(Syria) Mohammed Osman	(Morocco) Adnane Tighadouini
Al-Khor	(Brazil) Rafael Vaz	(Germany) **Pierre-Michel Lasogga**	(Greece) Giannis Fetfatzidis	(Japan) Yuki Kobayashi	(Morocco) **Ismail El Haddad**	(Brazil) Léo Gamalho (Brazil) Lucca (Lebanon) Alexander Michel Melki (Madagascar) Ibrahim Amada
Al-Rayyan	(Argentina) Gabriel Mercado	(Cameroon) Franck Kom	(Ivory Coast) Yohan Boli	(Iran) Shojae Khalilzadeh	(Algeria) Yacine Brahimi	
Al Sadd	(Brazil) Guilherme	(South Korea) Jung Woo-young	(Spain) Santi Cazorla	(South Korea) Nam Tae-hee	(Algeria) Baghdad Bounedjah	
Al-Sailiya	(Algeria) Nadir Belhadj	(Brazil) Tiago Bezerra	(Senegal) Kara Mbodji	(Iran) **Ramin Rezaeian**	(Iraq) Mohanad Ali	(Morocco) Ahmed Hammoudan
Al-Wakrah	(Algeria) **Abdennour Belhocini**	(Brazil) Lucas Mendes	(Mali) Ousmane Coulibaly	(Spain) Isaías^{1}	(Algeria) Mohamed Benyettou	(Kuwait) Fahad Al Ansari (Spain) Cristian Ceballos
Qatar SC	(Algeria) Youcef Belaïli	(Nigeria) Anthony Okpotu	(Spain) **Cristian Ceballos**	(Iraq) **Bashar Resan**	(Morocco) Mehdi Berrahma	(Brazil) Kayke (Iran) Ali Karimi (Netherlands) Abdenasser El Khayati (Spain) Álex Gálvez
Umm Salal	(Brazil) Kayke	(Morocco) **Ahmed Hammoudan**	(Nigeria) Moses Orkuma	(Iran) Rouzbeh Cheshmi	(Tunisia) Aymen Abdennour	(Algeria) Abdennour Belhocini (Algeria) Ayoub Azzi (Algeria) Walid Mesloub (Ivory Coast) Jean-Paul Késsé Amangoua (Ivory Coast) Yannick Sagbo (Syria) Mahmoud Al-Mawas

^1 Isaías has Australian citizenship and was counted as Asian player.

== League table ==
Pos	Team	Pld	W	D	L	GF	GA	GD	Pts	Qualification or relegation
1	Al Sadd (C)	22	19	3	0	77	14	+63	60	Qualification for AFC Champions League group stage
2	Al Duhail	22	15	2	5	53	25	+28	47	Qualification for AFC Champions League group stage
3	Al-Rayyan	22	10	5	7	31	22	+9	35	Qualification for AFC Champions League group stage
4	Al-Gharafa	22	10	3	9	41	34	+7	33	Qualification for AFC Champions League play-off round
5	Al Ahli	22	10	3	9	28	38	−10	33	
6	Qatar SC	22	9	5	8	30	24	+6	32	
7	Al-Arabi	22	8	5	9	28	32	−4	29	
8	Al-Wakrah	22	7	5	10	19	29	−10	26	
9	Al-Sailiya	22	7	5	10	22	36	−14	26	
10	Umm Salal	22	5	6	11	13	31	−18	21	
11	Al-Khor (O)	22	3	8	11	17	42	−25	17	Qualification for Relegation play-off
12	Al Kharaitiyat (R)	22	4	0	18	17	49	−32	12	Relegation to Qatargas League

Source: QSL, Soccerway
Rules for classification: 1) Points; 2) Goal difference; 3) Number of goals scored;
(C) Champions; (O) Play-off winners; (R) Relegated

== Results ==
Home \ Away	AHL	ARA	DUH	GHA	KHA	KHO	RAY	SAD	SAI	WAK	QAT	UMM
Al Ahli	—	2–0	3–5	0–4	2–0	1–2	1–1	1–7	2–0	2–1	1–4	1–0
Al-Arabi	1–0	—	2–3	1–2	1–2	3–0	1–1	1–4	3–1	1–0	1–0	2–1
Al Duhail	4–0	2–0	—	0–3	4–1	6–1	2–0	1–3	1–2	8–1	2–1	3–0
Al-Gharafa	1–3	1–1	1–2	—	2–0	6–3	1–3	0–2	0–1	1–0	2–0	1–1
Al Kharaitiyat	1–2	1–3	0–2	1–2	—	2–1	0–3	1–5	0–2	0–2	2–1	3–0
Al-Khor	0–1	2–2	1–1	1–3	2–1	—	0–1	0–0	0–0	1–0	1–2	0–1
Al-Rayyan	3–1	2–0	1–2	2–1	2–0	1–1	—	0–1	0–2	1–0	2–1	1–1
Al Sadd	3–0	3–2	3–1	4–1	5–0	7–0	2–1	—	8–0	1–1	3–0	3–1
Al-Sailiya	0–0	0–1	0–2	4–2	2–0	1–1	1–1	1–5	—	1–3	1–3	1–1
Al-Wakrah	0–2	2–2	1–0	2–0	2–1	0–0	0–2	1–4	1–0	—	0–0	2–0
Qatar SC	1–1	3–0	1–1	2–2	3–1	3–0	1–0	1–1	1–2	1–0	—	0–1
Umm Salal	0–2	0–0	0–1	1–5	1–0	0–0	3–2	0–3	1–0	0–0	0–1	—

Source: QSL, Soccerway
Legend: Blue = home team win; Yellow = draw; Red = away team win.

=== Positions by round ===
Leader : 2022 AFC Champions League Group stage
2021 AFC Champions League group stage
2022 AFC Champions League qualifying play-off
Qualification to Relegation play-off
Relegation to 2021–22 Qatargas League

Team ╲ Round	1	2	3	4	5	6	7	8	9	10	11	12	13	14	15	16	17	18	19	20	21	22
Al Sadd	1	1	1	2	1	1	1	1	1	1	1	1	1	1	1	1	1	1	1	1	1	1
Al Duhail	2	4	4	6	4	5	4	6	5	4	3	2	2	2	2	2	2	2	2	2	2	2
Al-Rayyan	8	3	6	4	6	4	5	5	6	6	6	6	6	5	4	5	4	3	3	3	3	3
Al-Gharafa	3	5	5	3	3	3	3	2	3	2	2	3	4	3	3	4	5	4	5	6	6	4
Al Ahli	4	2	2	1	2	2	2	3	2	3	5	4	5	6	6	7	6	7	6	4	4	5
Qatar SC	10	12	8	10	12	8	7	4	4	5	4	5	3	4	5	3	3	5	4	5	5	6
Al-Arabi	5	9	11	7	9	10	10	10	11	9	9	7	7	7	7	6	7	6	7	7	8	7
Al-Wakrah	9	6	3	5	5	7	6	8	8	8	7	9	10	10	10	10	10	9	9	9	9	8
Al-Sailiya	7	11	7	8	7	6	8	7	7	7	8	8	8	8	8	8	8	8	8	8	7	9
Umm Salal	11	10	12	12	10	12	12	9	9	10	10	10	9	9	9	9	9	10	10	10	10	10
Al-Khor	6	8	10	9	11	11	11	12	10	11	11	11	11	11	11	11	11	11	11	11	11	11
Al Kharaitiyat	12	7	9	11	8	9	9	11	12	12	12	12	12	12	12	12	12	12	12	12	12	12

Source: QSL

== Relegation play-off ==
5 May 2021
12:00

Al-Khor	3-1	Al Shahaniya
Fetfatzidis 2'; Kobayashi 19'; Brahmi 77' (pen.)		Al-Yahri 86'

Suheim bin Hamad Stadium
Attendance: 0
Referee: Saoud Ali Al-Adba

== Season statistics ==
=== Top scorers ===
Rank	Player	Club	Goals
1	(Algeria) Baghdad Bounedjah	Al Sadd	21
2	(Brazil) Dudu	Al Duhail	14
3	(Algeria) Youcef Belaïli	Qatar SC	13
3	(Spain) Santi Cazorla	Al Sadd	13
5	(Belgium) Edmilson Junior	Al Duhail	12
6	(Ivory Coast) Jonathan Kodjia	Al-Gharafa	11
6	(Ivory Coast) Yohan Boli	Al-Rayyan	11
8	(Iran) Mehrdad Mohammadi	Al-Arabi	10
8	(Morocco) Nabil El Zhar	Al Ahli	10
8	(Qatar) Rodrigo Tabata	Al Sadd	10

=== Clean sheets ===
As of 29 December 2020

Rank	Player	Club	Clean sheets
1	(Brazil) Ivanildo	Al Ahli	5
2	(Qatar) Jassem Adel	Qatar SC	4
2	(Senegal) Papa Djibril	Al-Khor	4
4	(Qatar) Baba Malick	Umm Salal	3
4	(Qatar) Fahad Younes	Al-Rayyan	3
4	(Qatar) Salah Zakaria	Al-Gharafa	3
7	(Qatar) Amine Lecomte	Al-Sailiya	2
7	(Qatar) Meshaal Barsham	Al Sadd	2
7	(Qatar) Qasem Burhan	Al-Gharafa	2
7	(Qatar) Saoud Al Khater	Al-Wakrah	2
11	(Qatar) Khalifa Ababacar	Al Duhail	1
11	(Qatar) Mahmud Abunada	Al-Arabi	1
11	(Qatar) Mohammed Al-Bakri	Al Duhail	1
