= 2022–23 Al Sadd SC season =

Al Sadd SC
2022–23 season
- Chairman: Muhammed bin Khalifa Al Thani
- Head coach: Juan Manuel Lillo (from 18 June 2022)
- Stadium: Jassim Bin Hamad Stadium
- Qatar Stars League: 3rd
- Emir of Qatar Cup: Runners–up
- Qatar Cup: Runners–up
- Top goalscorer: League: Baghdad Bounedjah (11); All: Baghdad Bounedjah (14)
Home colours	Away colours	Third colours

In the 2022–23 season, Al Sadd SC is competing in the Qatar Stars League for the 50th season, as well as the Emir of Qatar Cup.

== Squad list ==
Players and squad numbers last updated on 28 September 2022.
Note: Flags indicate national team as has been defined under FIFA eligibility rules. Players may hold more than one non-FIFA nationality.

No.	Nat.	Position	Name	Date of Birth (Age)	Signed from
Goalkeepers
1	(Qatar)	GK	Saad Al Sheeb	19 February 1990 (aged 32)	(Qatar) Al Sailiya
22	(Qatar)	GK	Meshaal Barsham	14 February 1998 (aged 24)	(Qatar) Youth system
90	(Qatar)	GK	Ivanildo Rodrigues	12 December 1988 (aged 33)	(Qatar) Al Ahli
Defenders
2	(Qatar)	CB	Pedro Miguel	6 August 1990 (aged 31)	(Qatar) Al Ahli
3	(Qatar)	LB	Abdelkarim Hassan	28 August 1993 (aged 28)	(Qatar) Youth system
6	(Qatar)	CB	Tarek Salman	5 December 1997 (aged 24)	(Spain) Júpiter Leonés
16	(Qatar)	LB / CB	Boualem Khoukhi	7 September 1990 (aged 31)	(Qatar) Al Arabi
21	(Qatar)	CB	Abdelrahman Rashid	20 November 2001 (aged 20)	(Qatar) Youth system
26	(Qatar)	CB	Talal Bahzad	6 September 1999 (aged 22)	(Qatar) Youth system
27	(Qatar)	CB	Bahaa Ellethy	19 April 1999 (aged 23)	(Qatar) Youth system
37	(Qatar)	CB	Ahmed Suhail	8 February 1999 (aged 23)	(Qatar) Youth system
66	(Qatar)		Abdulrahman Al-Ameen	9 March 2004 (aged 18)	(Qatar) Youth system
70	(Qatar)	RB	Musab Kheder	1 January 1993 (aged 29)	(Qatar) Youth system
77	(Qatar)		Mouz Abdalla	10 March 2001 (aged 21)	(Qatar) Youth system
98	(Qatar)		Nayef Hamid	9 June 2004 (aged 18)	(Qatar) Youth system
Midfielders
4	(Qatar)	DM	Ahmed Sayyar	6 October 1993 (aged 28)	(Qatar) Al-Gharafa
5	(South Korea)	DM	Jung Woo-young	14 December 1989 (aged 32)	(Japan) Vissel Kobe
7	(Qatar)	DM / AM	Mohammed Al Bayati	18 September 1999 (aged 22)	(Qatar) Youth system
8	(Qatar)	CM	Ali Assadalla	19 January 1993 (aged 29)	(Bahrain) Al Muharraq
10	(Qatar)	RW	Hassan Al-Haidos	11 December 1990 (aged 31)	(Qatar) Youth system
12	(Qatar)	AM	Rodrigo Tabata	19 November 1980 (aged 41)	(Qatar) Al-Rayyan
14	(Qatar)		Mostafa Tarek	28 March 2001 (aged 21)	(Qatar) Al-Rayyan SC
18	(Brazil)	DM	Guilherme Torres	5 April 1991 (aged 31)	(Greece) Olympiacos
19	(Spain)	CM	Santi Cazorla	13 December 1984 (aged 37)	(Spain) Villarreal
20	(Qatar)	DM	Salem Al-Hajri	10 April 1996 (aged 26)	(Belgium) Eupen
23	(Qatar)	RW	Hashim Ali	17 August 2000 (aged 21)	(Qatar) Al-Rayyan (Loan return)
24	(Ghana)	AM	André Ayew	17 December 1989 (aged 32)	(Wales) Swansea City
25	(Qatar)		Mohammed Al-Quraishi		(Qatar)
33	(Qatar)		Moaz Al-Wadia	7 December 2005 (aged 16)	(Qatar) Youth system
44	(Qatar)		Mahdi Salem	4 April 2004 (aged 18)	(Qatar) Youth system
47	(Qatar)		Faisal Azadi	13 January 2001 (aged 21)	(Qatar) Aspire Academy
97	(Qatar)		Abdullah Mahdi		(Qatar)
Forwards
9	(Qatar)	CF	Yusuf Abdurisag	6 August 1999 (aged 22)	(Qatar) Youth system
11	(Algeria)	ST	Baghdad Bounedjah	24 November 1991 (aged 30)	(Tunisia) Étoile du Sahel
15	(Qatar)	LW	Akram Afif	18 November 1996 (aged 25)	(Qatar) Al Markhiya
17	(Qatar)		Hassan Palang	2 April 1998 (aged 24)	(Qatar) Al Ahli (Loan return)
28	(Qatar)		Ahmed Al-Saeed		(Qatar) Youth system

== Competitions ==
=== Overview ===
Competition	Record								Started round	Final position / round	First match	Last match
Competition	G	W	D	L	GF	GA	GD	Win %	Started round	Final position / round	First match	Last match
Qatar Stars League	22	14	2	6	46	26	+20	63.64	Matchday 1	3rd	1 August 2022	8 May 2023
Emir of Qatar Cup	4	3	0	1	12	5	+7	75.00	Round of 16	Runners–up	7 March 2023	12 May 2023
Qatar Cup	2	1	0	1	3	3	+0	50.00	Semi-finals	Runners–up	9 February 2023	6 April 2023
Ooredoo Cup	6	3	0	3	16	9	+7	50.00	Group Stage	Semi-Final	19 September 2022	23 March 2023
Total	34	21	2	11	77	43	+34	61.76				

Updated to match played 12 May 2023
Source: Competitions

=== Qatar Stars League ===
==== League table ====
Pos	Team	Pld	W	D	L	GF	GA	GD	Pts	Qualification or relegation
1	Al-Duhail (C)	22	16	3	3	50	26	+24	51	Qualification for AFC Champions League group stage
2	Al-Arabi	22	16	1	5	43	23	+20	49	Qualification for AFC Champions League play-off round
3	Al-Sadd (Note: Qualified as 2021-22 champions.)	22	14	2	6	46	26	+20	44	Qualification for AFC Champions League group stage
4	Al-Wakrah	22	11	6	5	44	24	+20	39	Qualification for AFC Champions League play-off round
5	Qatar SC	22	11	3	8	28	30	−2	36	

Updated to match(es) played on 8 May 2023. Source: QSL, Soccerway
Rules for classification: 1) Points; 2) Goal difference; 3) Number of goals scored;
(C) Champions

==== Results summary ====
Overall								Home						Away					
Pld	W	D	L	GF	GA	GD	Pts	W	D	L	GF	GA	GD	W	D	L	GF	GA	GD
22	14	2	6	46	26	+20	44	7	1	3	23	12	+11	7	1	3	23	14	+9

Last updated: 8 May 2023.
Source: Competitive matches

==== Results by round ====
Round	1	2	3	4	5	6	7	8	9	10	11	12	13	14	15	16	17	18	19	20	21	22
Ground	A	A	H	H	A	H	A	H	A	H	A	H	H	A	A	H	A	H	A	H	A	H
Result	L	D	W	L	W	L	L	W	W	D	W	W	W	W	L	W	W	W	W	W	W	L
Position																						

Updated to match(es) played on 8 May 2023. Source: Competitive matches
A = Away; H = Home; W = Win; D = Draw; L = Loss

==== Matches ====
Win Draw Loss

1 August 2022 Round 1	Al-Markhiya	4–3	Al-Sadd	Doha
17:35	Hamroun 45+1'; Hussein 50', 75'; Al-Muhannadi 78'	Report	Tabata 5'; Bounedjah 37'; Cazorla 90+2'	Stadium: Khalifa International Stadium; Referee: Mohammed Al-Shammari

9 August 2022 Round 2	Umm Salal	1–1	Al-Sadd	Doha
17:30	João Teixeira 45+2'	Report	Bounedjah 63'	Stadium: Khalifa International Stadium; Referee: Saoud Al Athbah

17 August 2022 Round 3	Al-Sadd	3–2	Al-Ahli	Al Rayyan
17:25	Al-Saeed 18'; Guilherme Torres 45+3'; Tabata 87'	Report	Al-Naimat 9'; Hanni 42'	Stadium: Ahmad bin Ali Stadium; Referee: Hamad Al Subaie

23 August 2022 Round 4	Al-Sadd	1–2	Al-Gharafa	Al Rayyan
19:30	Guilherme Torres 72'	Report	Belfodil 39'; Brahimi 55'	Stadium: Education City Stadium; Referee: Saoud Al Athbah

30 August 2022 Round 5	Al-Sailiya	1–2	Al-Sadd	Al Rayyan
19:20	Strandberg 45+1'	Report	Ayew 17'; Bounedjah 65'	Stadium: Education City Stadium; Referee: Khalid Nabet

6 September 2022 Round 6	Al-Sadd	1–2	Al-Shamal	Doha
18:10	Ayew 7'	Report	Attwan 20' (pen.); Olwan 34'	Stadium: Jassim Bin Hamad Stadium; Referee: Khamis Al Marri

14 September 2022 Round 7	Al-Wakrah	2–1	Al-Sadd	Doha
20:15	Dala 73', 88'	Report	Cazorla 86' (pen.)	Stadium: Jassim Bin Hamad Stadium; Referee: Abdulrahman Al Jassim

11 January 2023 Round 9	Al-Rayyan	1–2	Al-Sadd	Doha
18:30	Nzonzi 56'	Report	Ayew 7'; Afif 51'	Stadium: Thani bin Jassim Stadium; Referee: Meshari Al Shammari

23 January 2023 Round 11	Al-Arabi	0–2	Al-Sadd	Doha
19:00		Report	Cazorla 66' (pen.); Al-Haidos 72'	Stadium: Grand Hamad Stadium; Referee: Saoud Al Athbah

29 January 2023 Round 12	Al-Sadd	1–0	Al-Markhiya	Doha
16:35	Bounedjah 12'	Report		Stadium: Jassim Bin Hamad Stadium; Referee: Nayef Mohamed El-Kadiri

4 February 2023 Round 13	Al-Sadd	2–0	Umm Salal	Doha
16:35	Bounedjah 9'; Afif 88'	Report		Stadium: Jassim Bin Hamad Stadium; Referee: Khalid Nabet

15 February 2023 Round 14	Al-Gharafa	1–3	Al-Sadd	Doha
18:55	Alaaeldin 26'	Report	Bounedjah 8', 55'; Guilherme 90+2'	Stadium: Thani bin Jassim Stadium; Referee: Abdullah Al Athbah

20 February 2023 Round 15	Al-Ahli	2–1	Al-Sadd	Doha
18:55	Yansané 44', 71'	Report	Afif 36'	Stadium: Hamad bin Khalifa Stadium; Referee: Sultan Al Sharshani

25 February 2023 Round 8	Al-Sadd	2–0	Qatar SC	Doha
16:45	Al-Haidos 45+4'; Afif 52'	Report		Stadium: Jassim Bin Hamad Stadium; Referee: Mohamed Al-Shammari

3 March 2023 Round 16	Al-Sadd	4–0	Al-Sailiya	Doha
19:30	Afif 10'; Guilherme 25'; Bounedjah 31'; Sayyar 75'	Report		Stadium: Jassim Bin Hamad Stadium; Referee: Saoud Al Athbah

12 March 2023 Round 10	Al-Sadd	2–2	Al-Duhail	Doha
19:45	Bounedjah 34'; Cazorla 57'	Report	Nam Tae-hee 90+6'; Fernández 90+8'	Stadium: Jassim Bin Hamad Stadium; Referee: Abdulhadi Al Ruaile

17 March 2023 Round 17	Al-Shamal	1–3	Al-Sadd	Doha
17:00	Khoukhi 3' (o.g.)	Report	Khoukhi 52', 90+2'; Afif 73'	Stadium: Grand Hamad Stadium; Referee: Mohammed Al-Sherif

1 April 2023 Round 18	Al-Sadd	4–2	Al-Wakrah	Doha
22:45	El Kaabi 27', 88'; Afif 48', 66'	Report	Sainsbury 57'; Gelson Dala 87'	Stadium: Saoud bin Abdulrahman Stadium; Referee: Salman Ahmad Falahi

15 April 2023 Round 19	Qatar SC	0–2	Al-Sadd	Doha
22:45		Report	Afif 67'; Al-Saeed 90+1'	Stadium: Suheim Bin Hamad Stadium; Referee: Abdullah Al Athbah

4 May 2023 Round 21	Al-Duhail	1–3	Al-Sadd	Doha
21:00	Olunga 73' (pen.)	Report	Bounedjah 41'; Afif 51'; Tabata 75'	Stadium: Abdullah bin Khalifa Stadium; Referee: Saoud Al Athbah

28 April 2023 Round 20	Al Sadd SC	2–0	Al-Rayyan	Doha
18:30		Report	Tabata 70'; Bounedjah 90+7'	Stadium: Jassim Bin Hamad Stadium; Referee: Mohammed Al Shummari

8 May 2023 Round 22	Al Sadd SC	1–2	Al-Arabi	Doha
19:00	Bounedjah 90+2'	Report	Marafee 2'; Al Somah 54'	Stadium: Jassim Bin Hamad Stadium; Referee: Abdulrahman Al Jassim

== Emir of Qatar Cup ==
7 March 2023 Round of 16	Al Sadd SC	4–0	Al-Markhiya SC	Doha
20:30	Bounedjah 11'; Assadalla 32'; Cazorla 62'; El Kaabi 90+9'	Report		Stadium: Abdullah bin Khalifa Stadium; Referee: Moatasem Al Mazyed

11 April 2023 Quarter-finals	Umm Salal SC	1–3	Al Sadd SC	Doha
23:45	Al Bakhit 82'	Report	Al-Haidos 52'; Afif 56'; El Kaabi 90+3'	Stadium: Abdullah bin Khalifa Stadium; Referee: Meshari Al Shammari

24 April 2023 Semi-finals	Al Sadd SC	5–1	Al Shahaniya SC	Doha
19:45	Cazorla 18' (pen.), 32'; El Kaabi 26'; Bounedjah 88', 90+4'	Report		Stadium: Jassim bin Hamad Stadium; Referee: Meshari Al Shammari

12 May 2023 Final	Al Sadd SC	0–3	Al-Arabi	Doha
19:00		Report	Al Somah 62', 90+8'; Ismail 90+1'	Stadium: Ahmad bin Ali Stadium; Referee: Abdulhadi Al Ruaile; Assistant referees: Juma Al Burshaid, Abdulmajeed Al-Karbi; Fourth official: Mohammed Al-Shammari

== Qatar Cup ==
The Qatar Cup, more widely known as the Crown Prince Cup, was the nineteenth edition of the Qatar Cup. It is played from February 9, 2023 – April 6, 2023. The cup is contested by the top four finishers of the 2021–22 Qatar Stars League.

9 February 2023 Semi-finals	Al Sadd SC	3–1	Al-Arabi SC	Doha
14:40	Jung Woo-young 43'; Bounedjah 45'; Kheder 79'	Report	Khoukhi 86' (o.g.)	Stadium: Jassim bin Hamad Stadium; Referee: Abdulhadi Al Ruaile

6 April 2023 Final	Al Sadd SC	0–2	Al-Duhail SC	Al Rayyan
22:00		Report	Olunga 48'; Sassi 53'	Stadium: Jassim Bin Hamad Stadium; Referee: Abdulhadi Al Ruaile

== Squad information ==
=== Playing statistics ===
No.	Pos	Nat	Player	Total		Qatar Stars League		Emir of Qatar Cup	
No.	Pos	Nat	Player	Apps	Goals	Apps	Goals	Apps	Goals
1	GK	(Qatar) QAT	Saad Al Sheeb	11	0	7	0	4	0
22	GK	(Qatar) QAT	Meshaal Barsham	7	0	7	0	0	0
30	GK	(Qatar) QAT	Jehad Mohammad Hudib	4	0	4	0	0	0
90	GK	(Qatar) QAT	Ivandildo Rodrigues	0	0	0	0	0	0
2	DF	(Qatar) QAT	Pedro Miguel	12	0	9	0	3	0
6	DF	(Qatar) QAT	Tarek Salman	16	0	12	0	4	0
16	DF	(Qatar) QAT	Boualem Khoukhi	17	2	13	2	4	0
21	DF	(Qatar) QAT	Abdelrahman Rashid	10	0	7	0	3	0
26	DF	(Qatar) QAT	Talal Bahzad	0	0	0	0	0	0
27	DF	(Qatar) QAT	Bahaa Ellethy	0	0	0	0	0	0
37	DF	(Qatar) QAT	Ahmed Suhail	0	0	0	0	0	0
66	DF	(Qatar) QAT	Abdulrahman Al-Ameen	3	0	3	0	0	0
70	DF	(Qatar) QAT	Musab Kheder	15	0	13	0	2	0
77	DF	(Qatar) QAT	Mouz Abdalla	0	0	0	0	0	0
98	DF	(Qatar) QAT	Nayef Hamid	0	0	0	0	0	0
4	MF	(Qatar) QAT	Ahmed Sayyar	6	1	6	1	0	0
5	MF	(South Korea) KOR	Jung Woo-young	20	0	18	0	2	0
7	MF	(Qatar) QAT	Mohammed Al Bayati	2	0	2	0	0	0
8	MF	(Qatar) QAT	Ali Assadalla	13	1	9	0	4	1
14	MF	(Qatar) QAT	Mostafa Tarek	0	0	0	0	0	0
12	MF	(Qatar) QAT	Rodrigo Tabata	16	4	13	4	3	0
13	MF	(Qatar) QAT	Abdullah Al-Yazidi	12	0	11	0	1	0
14	MF	(Qatar) QAT	Mostafa Tarek	0	0	0	0	0	0
18	MF	(Brazil) BRA	Guilherme Torres	24	4	20	4	4	0
19	MF	(Spain) ESP	Santi Cazorla	23	7	19	4	4	3
20	MF	(Qatar) QAT	Salem Al-Hajri	1	0	1	0	0	0
23	MF	(Qatar) QAT	Hashim Ali	14	0	12	0	2	0
25	MF	(Qatar) QAT	Mohammed Al-Quraishi	0	0	0	0	0	0
33	MF	(Qatar) QAT	Moaz Al-Wadia	0	0	0	0	0	0
44	MF	(Qatar) QAT	Mahdi Salem	2	0	2	0	0	0
47	MF	(Qatar) QAT	Faisal Azadi	0	0	0	0	0	0
97	MF	(Qatar) QAT	Abdullah Mahdi	0	0	0	0	0	0
9	FW	(Qatar) QAT	Yusuf Abdurisag	0	0	0	0	0	0
10	FW	(Qatar) QAT	Hassan Al-Haidos	17	3	13	2	4	1
11	FW	(Algeria) ALG	Baghdad Bounedjah	25	15	21	12	4	3
15	FW	(Qatar) QAT	Akram Afif	19	11	15	10	4	1
17	FW	(Qatar) QAT	Hassan Palang	4	0	4	0	0	0
17	FW	(Qatar) QAT	Ayoub El Kaabi	11	5	7	2	4	3
28	FW	(Qatar) QAT	Ahmed Al-Saeed	13	2	13	2	0	0
Players transferred out during the season
3	DF	(Qatar) QAT	Abdelkarim Hassan	0	0	0	0	0	0
24	MF	(Ghana) GHA	André Ayew	9	3	9	3	0	0

Last updated: 12 May 2023
Source: fr.soccerway.com

=== Goalscorers ===
Includes all competitive matches. The list is sorted alphabetically by surname when total goals are equal.

No.	Nat.	Player	Pos.	QSL	QEC	TOTAL
11	(Algeria)	Baghdad Bounedjah	FW	12	3	15
15	(Qatar)	Akram Afif	FW	10	1	11
19	(Spain)	Santi Cazorla	CM	4	3	7
17	(Morocco)	Ayoub El Kaabi	FW	2	3	5
12	(Qatar)	Rodrigo Tabata	AM	4	0	4
18	(Brazil)	Guilherme Torres	MF	4	0	4
24	(Ghana)	André Ayew	MF	3	0	3
10	(Qatar)	Hassan Al-Haidos	MF	2	1	3
28	(Qatar)	Ahmed Al-Saeed	FW	2	0	2
16	(Qatar)	Boualem Khoukhi	DF	2	0	2
4	(Qatar)	Ahmed Sayyar	MF	1	0	1
8	(Qatar)	Ali Assadalla	MF	0	1	1
Own Goals				0	0	0
Totals				46	12	58

=== Assists ===
No.	Nat.	Player	Pos.	QSL	EQC	TOTAL
11	(Algeria)	Baghdad Bounedjah	FW	8	2	10
19	(Spain)	Santi Cazorla	CM	7	1	8
8	(Qatar)	Ali Assadalla	MF	5	1	6
15	(Qatar)	Akram Afif	FW	4	1	5
2	(Qatar)	Pedro Miguel	DF	4	0	4
70	(Qatar)	Musab Kheder	DF	2	0	2
10	(Qatar)	Hassan Al-Haidos	MF	2	0	2
28	(Qatar)	Ahmed Al-Saeed	FW	1	0	1
24	(Ghana)	André Ayew	AM	1	0	1
18	(Brazil)	Guilherme Torres	MF	1	0	1
13	(Qatar)	Abdullah Badr Al Yazidi	MF	1	0	1
17	(Massachusetts)	Ayoub El Kaabi	FW	1	0	1
16	(Qatar)	Boualem Khoukhi	DF	0	1	1
12	(Qatar)	Rodrigo Tabata	AM	0	1	1
Totals				37	7	44

== Transfers ==
=== In ===
Date	Pos	Player	From club	Transfer fee	Source
7 August 2022	GK	(Qatar) Ivanildo Rodrigues	Al Ahli	Loan for one year	
1 March 2023	FW	(Morocco) Ayoub El Kaabi	(Turkey) Hatayspor	Free transfer	

=== Out ===
Date	Pos	Player	To club	Transfer fee	Source
22 December 2022	DF	(Qatar) Abdelkarim Hassan	(Kuwait) Al-Jahra	Free transfer (Released)	
2 February 2023	MF	(Ghana) André Ayew	(England) Nottingham Forest	Free transfer (Released)	
