= Bahaa Ellethy =

Qatari footballer (born 1999)

Personal information
- Full name: Bahaa Mamdouh Mamdouh Ellethy
- Date of birth: 19 April 1999 (age 27)
- Height: 1.90 m (6 ft 3 in)
- Position: Center-back

Team information
- Current team: Al Shahaniya (on loan from Al-Rayyan)
- Number: 14

Senior career*
Years	Team	Apps	(Gls)
2018–2023	Al Sadd SC	28	(0)
2019–2020	→ Qatar SC (loan)	10	(0)
2021–2022	→ Qatar SC (loan)	16	(0)
2023–2025	Qatar SC	0	(0)
2023–2024	→ Muaither (loan)	20	(0)
2024–2025	→ Al Ahli (loan)	21	(0)
2025–	Al-Rayyan	3	(1)
2026–	→ Al Shahaniya (loan)	8	(0)

International career^{‡}
2018	Qatar U19	1	(0)
2019	Qatar U20	3	(0)
2018	Qatar U21	4	(0)
2019–2023	Qatar U23	8	(0)
2024	Qatar	1	(0)
- * Club domestic league appearances and goals as of 14:09, 7 June 2026 (UTC) ‡ National team caps and goals as of 21 December 2024

Bahaa Mamdouh Mamdouh Ellethy (born 19 April 1999) is a professional footballer who plays as a center-back for Qatar Stars League side Al Shahaniya. Born in Egypt, he represents the Qatar national team.

== Club career ==
Ellethy began his professional career with Al Sadd in 2018. He was loaned to Qatar SC twice since 2019 and returned to Al Sadd in July 2022.

== Honours ==
Al-Sadd

- Qatar Stars League: 2018–19, 2020–21
- Sheikh Jassim Cup: 2017, 2019
- Qatari Stars Cup: 2019–20
- Emir of Qatar Cup: 2020
- Qatar Cup: 2021
