= Dicko =

Dicko is the pseudonym of Ian Dickson (TV personality).

It is also a surname of Fulfulde origin. It may refer to:

- Hamadoun Dicko (1924–1964), Malian politician
- Djaffar Dicko (born 1972 or 1980), Burkinabe jihadist
- Cheikh Sidahmed Dicko (born 1973), Mauritanian geopolitician
- Hassan Idriss Dicko (born 1985), Qatari born-Senegalese footballer
- Mahmoud Dicko (born 1954), Malian Salafi imam
- Mohamed Sidda Dicko, Malian politician
- Moustapha Dicko, Malian politician
- Nouha Dicko (born 1992), Malian footballer
- Romane Dicko (born 1999), French judoka
