= QIC =

QIC may refer to:

- QIC-United Evangelical Church (Qua Iboe Church), a Christian denomination in Nigeria
- Quarter-inch cartridge, a magnetic tape data storage format
- Queensland Investment Corporation, an investment fund operated by the state government of Queensland
- Qatar Insurance Company, a Qatari insurance company
