= 2021 Qatar Cup =

Tournament details
- Country: Qatar
- Dates: February 18–26
- Teams: 4

Final positions
- Champions: Al Sadd (8th title)
- Runners-up: Al-Duhail

Tournament statistics
- Matches played: 3
- Goals scored: 6 (2 per match)
- Top goal scorer(s): (Algeria) Baghdad Bounedjah (2 goals)

The 2021 Qatar Cup, more widely known as the Crown Prince Cup, was the eighteenth edition of the Qatar Cup. It was played from February 18–26. The cup is contested by the top four finishers of the 2019–20 Qatar Stars League.

== Participants ==
| Team | 2019–20 League Position |
|---|---|
| Al-Duhail | Champions |
| Al-Rayyan | Runners-up |
| Al Sadd | Third |
| Al-Gharafa | Fourth |

== Matches ==
=== Semi-finals ===
18 February 2021
16:45 AST

| Al-Rayyan | 0–1 | Al Sadd |
|---|---|---|
| | Report | Cazorla 84' (pen.) |

Abdullah bin Khalifa Stadium, Doha
Referee: Saoud Ali Al Adba
18 February 2021
19:45 AST

| Al-Duhail | 2–1 | Al-Gharafa |
|---|---|---|
| Karimi 36'; Al-Brake 72' | Report | Al-Yahri 20' |

Abdullah bin Khalifa Stadium, Doha
Referee: Salman Ahmad Falahi

== Finals ==
26 February 2021
16:45 AST

| Al-Duhail | 0–2 | Al Sadd |
|---|---|---|
| | Report | Bounedjah 9', 77' |

Abdullah bin Khalifa Stadium, Doha
Referee: Khamis Al Marri

== Bracket ==
Semi-finals
2021–02–18 - Doha
Al-Rayyan | 0
Al Sadd | 1
2021–02–18 - Doha
Al-Duhail | 2
Al-Gharafa | 1

Final
2021–02–26 - Doha
Al Sadd | 2
Al-Duhail | 0

== Top scorers ==
As of 26 February 2021

| Rank | Player | Club | Goals |
|---|---|---|---|
| 1 | (Algeria) Baghdad Bounedjah | Al Sadd | 2 |
| 2 | (Qatar) Othman Al-Yahri | Al-Gharafa | 1 |
| 2 | (Iran) Ali Karimi | Al-Duhail | 1 |
| 2 | (Qatar) Sultan Al-Brake | Al-Duhail | 1 |
| 2 | (Spain) Santi Cazorla | Al Sadd | 1 |
