= 2023 Amir of Qatar Cup =

Amir Cup 2023 (Qatar)
Tournament details
- Country: Qatar
- Dates: 27 January – 12 May 2023
- Teams: 17

Final positions
- Champions: Al-Arabi
- Runners-up: Al-Sadd

Tournament statistics
- Matches played: 15
- Goals scored: 56 (3.73 per match)

The 2023 Amir of Qatar Cup (named Amir Cup since 2019) is the 51st edition of the Qatari cup tournament in men's football. It is played by the first and second level divisions of the Qatari football league structure. Al-Arabi won the final defeating Al-Saad 3–0.

== Round of 16 ==
6 March 2023	Umm Salal SC	1–0	Al-Khor SC	Doha
17:45 AST (UTC+3)	Yaseen Al-Bakhit 90+2'	Report		Stadium: Hamad bin Khalifa Stadium; Referee: Youssef Al Sharshani

6 March 2023	Al-Duhail SC	1–0	Al-Kharaitiyat SC	Doha
20:30 AST (UTC+3)	Ismaeel Mohammad 12'	Report		Stadium: Thani bin Jassim Stadium; Referee: Mohammed Al Obedly

7 March 2023	Al-Rayyan SC	1–2	Al-Sailiya SC	Doha
17:45 AST (UTC+3)	Yohan Boli 26'	Report	Carlos Strandberg 9'; Mehrdad Mohammadi 79'	Stadium: Suheim bin Hamad Stadium; Referee: Sultan Al Sharshani

7 March 2023	Al Sadd SC	4–0	Al-Markhiya SC	Doha
20:30 AST (UTC+3)	Baghdad Bounedjah 11'; Ali Assadalla 32'; Santi Cazorla 62'; Ayoub El Kaabi 90+9'	Report		Stadium: Abdullah bin Khalifa Stadium; Referee: Moatasem Al Mazyed

8 March 2023	Al-Wakrah SC	1–1 (2–4 p)	Al Shahaniya SC	Doha
17:45 AST (UTC+3)	Yusuf Abdurisag 56'	Report	Amir Roustaei 50'	Stadium: Hamad bin Khalifa Stadium; Referee: Khalid Nabet
	Penalties
	Mohamed Benyettou (penalty scored)		Niall Mason (penalty scored); Ulises Pascua (penalty scored); Amir Roustaei (penalty scored)

8 March 2023	Al-Arabi SC	3–0	Al-Shamal SC	Doha
20:30 AST (UTC+3)	Aron Gunnarsson 29'; Omar Al Somah 85', 90+1'	Report		Stadium: Thani bin Jassim Stadium; Referee: Nayef Mohamed El-Kadiri

9 March 2023	Al-Ahli SC	1–3	Muaither SC	Doha
17:45 AST (UTC+3)	Nikola Vukčević 90+1'	Report	George Kwasi Semakor 42'; Jamal Hamed 83'; Alaeddine Ajaraie 90+4'	Stadium: Suheim bin Hamad Stadium; Referee: Hamad Al Subaie

9 March 2023	Al-Gharafa SC	4–1	Qatar SC	Doha
20:30 AST (UTC+3)	Ahmed Alaaeldin 11'; Yacine Brahimi 18'; Ahmed Al Ganehi 44'; Moayed Hassan 82'	Report	Badr Benoun 48'	Referee: Meshari Al Shammari

== Quarter-finals ==
8 April 2023	Muaither SC	0–2	Al-Arabi SC	Doha
23:45 AST (UTC+3)		Report		Stadium: Abdullah bin Khalifa Stadium

9 April 2023	Al Shahaniya SC	3–3 (4–3 p)	Al-Gharafa SC	Doha
23:45 AST (UTC+3)		Report		Stadium: Jassim Bin Hamad Stadium

10 April 2023	Al-Sailiya SC	2–2 (5–4 p)	Al-Duhail SC	Doha
23:45 AST (UTC+3)		Report		Stadium: Jassim bin Hamad Stadium

11 April 2023	Umm Salal SC	1 – 3	Al Sadd SC	Doha
23:45 AST (UTC+3)		Report		Stadium: Abdullah bin Khalifa Stadium

== Semi-finals ==
24 April 2023	Al Sadd SC	5-1	Al Shahaniya SC	Doha
19:45 AST (UTC+3)		Report		Stadium: Jassim bin Hamad Stadium

25 April 2023	Al-Sailiya SC	1-7	Al-Arabi SC	Doha
19:45 AST (UTC+3)		Report		Stadium: Hamad bin Khalifa Stadium

== Final ==
12 May 2023	Al Sadd SC	0–3	Al-Arabi SC	Doha
19:00			Al Somah 62', 90+8' Ismail 90+1'	Stadium: Ahmed bin Ali Stadium; Referee: Abdulhadi Al-Ruaile
