= 2018–19 Qatar Stars League =

55th season of top-tier football league in Qatar

Qatar Stars League
- Season: 2018–19
- Champions: Al Sadd (14th title)
- Relegated: Al Kharaitiyat
- AFC Champions League: Al Sadd; Al-Duhail; Al-Sailiya
- Matches: 132
- Goals: 429 (3.25 per match)
- Top goalscorer: Baghdad Bounedjah (39 goals)
- Biggest home win: Al Sadd 10–1 Al-Arabi (12 August 2018)
- Biggest away win: Al-Gharafa 1–8 Al Sadd (2 December 2018)
- Highest scoring: Al Sadd 10–1 Al-Arabi (12 August 2018)
- Longest winning run: 11 matches Al Sadd
- Longest unbeaten run: 11 matches Al Sadd
- Longest winless run: 9 matches Al Kharaitiyat
- Longest losing run: 9 matches Al Kharaitiyat

The 2018–19 Qatari League, also known as Qatar Stars League or QNB Stars League for sponsorship reasons, was the 46th edition of top-level football championship in Qatar.

The QSL has announced the dates of the first phase of the 2018–19 QNB Stars League. The first phase of the QNB Stars League kicked off on 4 August 2018 and ended on 4 November 2018. The league ended on 13 April 2019.

== Teams ==
=== Stadia and locations ===
| Club | City/Town | Stadium |
|---|---|---|
| Al Ahli | Doha | Hamad bin Khalifa Stadium |
| Al-Arabi | Doha | Grand Hamad Stadium |
| Al Duhail | Doha | Abdullah bin Khalifa Stadium |
| Al-Gharafa | Doha | Thani bin Jassim Stadium |
| Al Kharaitiyat | Al Khor | Al-Khor SC Stadium |
| Al-Khor | Al Khor | Al-Khor SC Stadium |
| Al-Rayyan | Al-Rayyan | Ahmed bin Ali Stadium |
| Al Sadd | Doha | Jassim Bin Hamad Stadium |
| Al-Sailiya | Doha | Hamad bin Khalifa Stadium |
| Al Shahaniya | Al-Shahaniya | Ahmed bin Ali Stadium |
| Qatar SC | Doha | Hamad bin Suhaim Al Thani |
| Umm Salal | Doha | Suheim Bin Hamad Stadium |

=== Personnel and kits ===
| Club | Coach | Kit manufacturer | Shirt sponsor |
|---|---|---|---|
| Al Ahli | (Spain) Rubén de la Barrera | Jako | N/A |
| Al-Arabi | (Iceland) Heimir Hallgrímsson | Jako | Doha Bank |
| Al Duhail | (Portugal) Rui Faria | BURRDA | Mashraf Al Rayan |
| Al-Gharafa | (France) Christian Gourcuff | Erreà | N/A |
| Al Kharaitiyat | (Qatar) Wesam Rizik | Hummel | Oryx GTL |
| Al-Khor | (Morocco) Omar Najhi | Macron | N/A |
| Al-Rayyan | (Ecuador) Gilson de Souza (caretaker) | Nike | QIC |
| Al Sadd | (Portugal) Jesualdo Ferreira | Puma | Qatar Airways |
| Al-Sailiya | (Tunisia) Sami Trabelsi | Adidas | UCC Holding; Qatar Islamic Bank |
| Al Shahaniya | (Spain) José Murcia | Adidas | N/A |
| Qatar SC | (Argentina) Sergio Batista | Puma | N/A |
| Umm Salal | (Spain) Raúl Caneda | Adidas | N/A |

=== Foreign players ===
Each clubs are allowed to have nine foreign players but can only register five professionals. For the remainder of the season, each clubs can include one player from the Asian Football Confederation (AFC) and one player from Union of Arab Football Associations (UAFA).

- Players name in **bold** indicates the player is registered during the mid-season transfer window.
- Players in italics were out of squad or left club within the season, after pre-season transfer window, or in the mid-season transfer window, and at least had one appearance.

| Club | Player 1 | Player 2 | Player 3 | AFC player | UAFA player | Former players |
|---|---|---|---|---|---|---|
| Al Ahli | (Costa Rica) **Jonathan McDonald** | (Netherlands) Nigel de Jong | (Venezuela) **Jhon Chancellor** | (Iran) Omid Ebrahimi | (Morocco) Mohsine Moutouali | (Iran) Mohammad Reza Khanzadeh |
| Al-Arabi | (Brazil) Diego Jardel | (Ivory Coast) **Wilfried Bony** | (Spain) **Víctor Vázquez** | (Iran) **Morteza Pouraliganji** | (Iraq) Ahmed Ibrahim Khalaf | (Brazil) Mailson (Colombia) Franco Arizala |
| Al Duhail | (Belgium) Edmilson Junior | (Morocco) **Medhi Benatia** | | (Japan) **Shoya Nakajima** | (Morocco) Youssef El-Arabi | (Brazil) Lucas Mendes (South Korea) Nam Tae-hee |
| Al-Gharafa | (Brazil) **Lucas Mendes** | (Portugal) Diogo Amado | (Slovakia) Vladimír Weiss | (Iran) Mehdi Taremi | | (Netherlands) Wesley Sneijder |
| Al Kharaitiyat | (Algeria) **Ilias Hassani** | (Colombia) **Charles Monsalvo** | (Romania) Valentin Lazăr | (Iraq) Ali Faez | (Morocco) Anouar Diba | (Algeria) Jugurtha Hamroun (Morocco) Abdelhadi Halhoul (Morocco) Youssef El Gnaoui |
| Al-Khor | (Brazil) **Tiago Bezerra** | (Brazil) Wágner | (Brazil) **Willians Santana** | (Lebanon) **Alexander Michel Melki** | (Tunisia) **Aymen Trabelsi** | (Brazil) Diogo Acosta (Iraq) Ahmed Yasin (Iraq) Rebin Sulaka |
| Al-Rayyan | (Brazil) Lucca | (Uruguay) Gonzalo Viera | (Venezuela) **Gelmin Rivas** | (South Korea) Koh Myong-jin | | (Argentina) Jony |
| Al Sadd | (Algeria) Baghdad Bounedjah | (Spain) Gabi | (Spain) Xavi | (South Korea) Jung Woo-young | | |
| Al-Sailiya | (Algeria) Nadir Belhadj | (Brazil) Maurício Ramos | (Morocco) Rachid Tiberkanine | (Syria) Fahd Youssef | (Tunisia) **Bilel Saidani** | |
| Al Shahaniya | (Argentina) Luciano Vázquez | (Ivory Coast) Jean-Paul Késsé Amangoua | (Spain) Álvaro Mejía | (Iran) Ramin Rezaeian | (Iraq) **Rebin Sulaka** | (Oman) Nadhir Awadh |
| Qatar SC | (Algeria) **Jugurtha Hamroun** | (Brazil) Dodô | (Cameroon) Samuel Eto'o | (Iraq) Hussein Ali Al-Saedi | (Jordan) **Baha' Abdel-Rahman** | (Syria) Osama Omari |
| Umm Salal | (Brazil) **Anderson Conceição** | (Brazil) **Tinga** | (Ivory Coast) Yannick Sagbo | (Syria) Mahmoud Al-Mawas | (Algeria) **Mourad Satli** | (Democratic Republic of the Congo) Arnold Mvuemba (Morocco) Adil Rhaili |

== League table ==
| Pos | Team | Pld | W | D | L | GF | GA | GD | Pts | Qualification or relegation |
|---|---|---|---|---|---|---|---|---|---|---|
| 1 | Al Sadd (C) | 22 | 18 | 3 | 1 | 100 | 22 | +78 | 57 | Qualification for AFC Champions League group stage and FIFA Club World Cup first round (Note: The league champions will qualify for the FIFA Club World Cup first round unless the 2019 AFC Champions League winners are from Qatar.) |
| 2 | Al Duhail | 22 | 15 | 5 | 2 | 52 | 17 | +35 | 50 | Qualification for AFC Champions League group stage (Note: Al Duhail qualified for the AFC Champions League group stage as Emir of Qatar Cup winners.) |
| 3 | Al-Sailiya | 22 | 12 | 2 | 8 | 38 | 26 | +12 | 38 | Qualification for AFC Champions League play-off round |
| 4 | Al-Rayyan | 22 | 10 | 7 | 5 | 34 | 31 | +3 | 37 | Qualification for AFC Champions League play-off round |
| 5 | Al Ahli | 22 | 10 | 4 | 8 | 32 | 39 | −7 | 34 | |
| 6 | Al-Arabi | 22 | 10 | 0 | 12 | 27 | 41 | −14 | 30 | |
| 7 | Al Shahaniya | 22 | 7 | 6 | 9 | 26 | 34 | −8 | 27 | |
| 8 | Al-Gharafa | 22 | 7 | 5 | 10 | 35 | 39 | −4 | 26 | |
| 9 | Umm Salal | 22 | 6 | 5 | 11 | 24 | 44 | −20 | 23 | |
| 10 | Al-Khor | 22 | 5 | 5 | 12 | 22 | 36 | −14 | 20 | |
| 11 | Qatar SC (O) | 22 | 4 | 4 | 14 | 20 | 42 | −22 | 16 | Qualification for Relegation play-off |
| 12 | Al Kharaitiyat (R) | 22 | 5 | 0 | 17 | 19 | 58 | −39 | 15 | Relegation to Qatargas League |

Source: QSL
Rules for classification: 1) Points; 2) Goal difference; 3) Number of goals scored;
(C) Champions; (O) Play-off winners; (R) Relegated

== Results ==
| Home \ Away | SAD | DUH | SAI | RAY | AHL | ARA | SHA | GHA | UMM | KHO | QAT | KHA |
|---|---|---|---|---|---|---|---|---|---|---|---|---|
| Al Sadd | | 3–1 | 1–1 | 5–0 | 7–2 | 10–1 | 4–0 | 1–1 | 6–1 | 6–2 | 8–1 | 7–1 |
| Al Duhail | 2–2 | | 1–0 | 0–0 | 6–0 | 2–0 | 5–1 | 4–2 | 2–0 | 6–0 | 1–1 | 4–1 |
| Al-Sailiya | 0–2 | 0–1 | | 1–2 | 4–2 | 2–3 | 1–3 | 2–1 | 2–1 | 2–1 | 0–1 | 5–2 |
| Al-Rayyan | 0–4 | 2–2 | 2–2 | | 2–0 | 3–1 | 1–0 | 1–1 | 1–1 | 1–0 | 4–3 | 2–1 |
| Al Ahli | 4–1 | 1–2 | 0–1 | 1–1 | | 2–1 | 0–0 | 0–4 | 0–0 | 1–1 | 2–0 | 3–2 |
| Al-Arabi | 0–3 | 0–3 | 0–2 | 0–1 | 0–3 | | 2–1 | 1–2 | 5–1 | 1–0 | 0–1 | 2–1 |
| Al-Shahaniya | 1–4 | 0–3 | 0–1 | 3–0 | 1–2 | 0–3 | | 3–1 | 1–1 | 1–1 | 3–2 | 1–0 |
| Al-Gharafa | 1–8 | 0–0 | 2–1 | 4–2 | 1–3 | 3–0 | 0–0 | | 2–3 | 6–0 | 1–3 | 0–2 |
| Umm Salal | 1–5 | 1–3 | 0–2 | 1–1 | 4–1 | 0–3 | 2–5 | 2–1 | | 1–0 | 1–1 | 0–1 |
| Al-Khor | 1–2 | 0–1 | 1–2 | 1–0 | 0–2 | 0–1 | 1–1 | 0–0 | 1–0 | | 3–1 | 4–0 |
| Qatar SC | 1–5 | 2–3 | 0–2 | 0–2 | 0–1 | 1–2 | 0–0 | 0–2 | 0–1 | 0–0 | | 2–0 |
| Al Kharaitiyat | 0–6 | 1–0 | 0–5 | 0–6 | 1–2 | 0–1 | 0–1 | 3–0 | 1–2 | 1–5 | 1–0 | |

Source: QSL
Legend: Blue = home team win; Yellow = draw; Red = away team win.

=== Positions by round ===
| Leader : 2020 AFC Champions League Group stage |
| 2020 AFC Champions League qualifying play-off |
| Relegation to 2019-20 Qatargas League |

| Team ╲ Round | 1 | 2 | 3 | 4 | 5 | 6 | 7 | 8 | 9 | 10 | 11 | 12 | 13 | 14 | 15 | 16 | 17 | 18 | 19 | 20 | 21 | 22 |
|---|---|---|---|---|---|---|---|---|---|---|---|---|---|---|---|---|---|---|---|---|---|---|
| Al Sadd | 1 | 1 | 1 | 1 | 3 | 2 | 2 | 2 | 2 | 3 | 3 | 2 | 2 | 2 | 1 | 1 | 1 | 1 | 1 | 1 | 1 | 1 |
| Al Duhail | 2 | 2 | 2 | 2 | 1 | 1 | 1 | 1 | 1 | 1 | 1 | 1 | 1 | 1 | 2 | 2 | 2 | 2 | 2 | 2 | 2 | 2 |
| Al-Sailiya | 5 | 4 | 3 | 3 | 4 | 3 | 3 | 3 | 3 | 4 | 4 | 3 | 3 | 3 | 3 | 5 | 3 | 3 | 4 | 3 | 3 | 3 |
| Al-Rayyan | 4 | 3 | 5 | 5 | 2 | 5 | 4 | 4 | 4 | 2 | 2 | 4 | 4 | 4 | 4 | 3 | 4 | 4 | 3 | 4 | 4 | 4 |
| Al Ahli | 10 | 6 | 10 | 10 | 9 | 9 | 9 | 8 | 6 | 6 | 5 | 5 | 5 | 5 | 5 | 4 | 5 | 5 | 5 | 5 | 5 | 5 |
| Al-Arabi | 6 | 9 | 4 | 4 | 5 | 4 | 6 | 6 | 7 | 8 | 9 | 8 | 9 | 7 | 6 | 6 | 6 | 6 | 6 | 6 | 6 | 6 |
| Al Shahaniya | 11 | 8 | 8 | 8 | 8 | 8 | 8 | 10 | 9 | 10 | 8 | 9 | 8 | 9 | 9 | 9 | 9 | 8 | 8 | 9 | 8 | 7 |
| Al-Gharafa | 9 | 7 | 7 | 6 | 6 | 7 | 7 | 7 | 8 | 7 | 6 | 6 | 6 | 6 | 7 | 8 | 8 | 9 | 7 | 7 | 7 | 8 |
| Umm Salal | 7 | 10 | 6 | 7 | 7 | 6 | 5 | 5 | 5 | 5 | 7 | 7 | 7 | 8 | 8 | 7 | 7 | 7 | 9 | 8 | 9 | 9 |
| Al-Khor | 8 | 12 | 11 | 11 | 11 | 11 | 12 | 11 | 10 | 11 | 11 | 11 | 11 | 11 | 11 | 11 | 11 | 11 | 11 | 10 | 10 | 10 |
| Qatar SC | 3 | 5 | 9 | 9 | 10 | 10 | 10 | 9 | 11 | 9 | 10 | 10 | 10 | 10 | 10 | 10 | 10 | 10 | 10 | 11 | 11 | 11 |
| Al Kharaitiyat | 12 | 11 | 12 | 12 | 12 | 12 | 11 | 12 | 12 | 12 | 12 | 12 | 12 | 12 | 12 | 12 | 12 | 12 | 12 | 12 | 12 | 12 |

Source: QSL

== Relegation play-off ==
17 April 2019
18:45

| Qatar SC | 1–0 | Muaither |
|---|---|---|
| Al-Saedi 38' | Report |

Abdullah bin Khalifa Stadium, Doha
Referee: Salman Ahmad Falahi

== Statistics ==
=== Top scorers ===
| Rank | Player | Club | Goals |
|---|---|---|---|
| 1 | (Algeria) Baghdad Bounedjah | Al Sadd | 39 |
| 2 | (Morocco) Youssef El-Arabi | Al Duhail | 26 |
| 2 | (Qatar) Akram Afif | Al Sadd | 26 |
| 4 | (Morocco) Rachid Tiberkanine | Al-Sailiya | 13 |
| 4 | (Qatar) Abdulgadir Ilyas Bakur | Al-Sailiya | 13 |
| 6 | (Qatar) Hassan Al-Haydos | Al Sadd | 10 |
| 7 | (Ivory Coast) Yannick Sagbo | Umm Salal | 9 |
| 7 | (Qatar) Rodrigo Tabata | Al-Rayyan | 9 |
| 9 | (Argentina) Luciano Vázquez | Al Shahaniya | 8 |
| 9 | (Brazil) Wágner | Al-Khor | 8 |
| 9 | (Iran) Mehdi Taremi | Al-Gharafa | 8 |
| 9 | (Slovakia) Vladimír Weiss | Al-Gharafa | 8 |
| 9 | (Syria) Mahmoud Al-Mawas | Umm Salal | 8 |

=== Hat-tricks ===
| Player | For | Against | Result | Date | Ref |
|---|---|---|---|---|---|
| (Algeria) Baghdad Bounedjah | Al Sadd | Al Kharaitiyat | 6–0 | 5 August 2018 | |
| (Algeria) Baghdad Bounedjah^{7} | Al Sadd | Al-Arabi | 10–1 | 12 August 2018 | |
| (Morocco) Rachid Tiberkanine | Al-Sailiya | Al Kharaitiyat | 5–0 | 4 November 2018 | |
| (Morocco) Youssef El-Arabi | Al Duhail | Al Shahaniya | 5–1 | 8 November 2018 | |
| (Algeria) Baghdad Bounedjah | Al Sadd | Al Kharaitiyat | 7–1 | 8 November 2018 | |
| (Algeria) Baghdad Bounedjah | Al Sadd | Al-Gharafa | 8–1 | 2 December 2018 | |
| (Qatar) Akram Afif | Al Sadd | Al-Gharafa | 8–1 | 2 December 2018 | |
| (Qatar) Akram Afif | Al Sadd | Al-Khor | 6–2 | 16 February 2019 | |
| (Qatar) Akram Afif | Al Sadd | Qatar SC | 8–1 | 28 February 2019 | |
| (Algeria) Baghdad Bounedjah | Al Sadd | Qatar SC | 8–1 | 28 February 2019 | |
| (Algeria) Baghdad Bounedjah | Al Sadd | Al Ahli | 7–2 | 4 April 2019 | |

Note

^{7} Player scored 7 goals

=== Team of the Year ===
| No | Position | | Player | Club |
|---|---|---|---|---|
| 1 | Goalkeeper | (Qatar) | Saad Al-Sheeb | Al Sadd |
| 2 | Defender | (Qatar) | Hamid Ismail | Al Sadd |
| 3 | Defender | (Qatar) | Boualem Khoukhi | Al Sadd |
| 4 | Defender | (Qatar) | Bassam Al-Rawi | Al Duhail |
| 5 | Defender | (Qatar) | Abdelkarim Hassan | Al Sadd |
| 6 | Midfielder | (Qatar) | Karim Boudiaf | Al Duhail |
| 7 | Midfielder | (Qatar) | Abdulaziz Hatem | Al-Gharafa |
| 8 | Midfielder | (Qatar) | Rodrigo Tabata | Al-Rayyan |
| 9 | Midfielder | (Qatar) | Hassan Al-Haydos | Al Sadd |
| 10 | Forward | (Qatar) | Akram Afif | Al Sadd |
| 11 | Forward | (Algeria) | Baghdad Bounedjah | Al Sadd |
