= Baghdad Bounedjah =

Algerian professional footballer (born 1991)

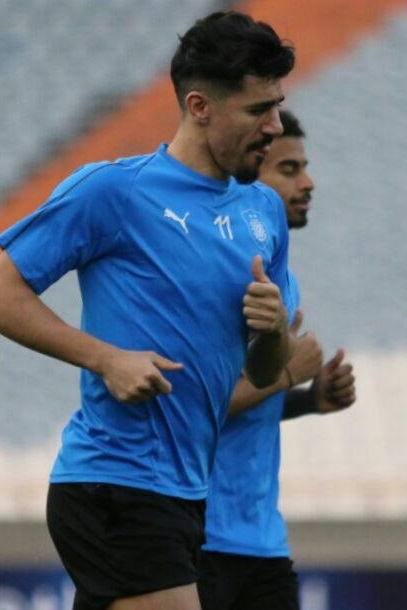
- Bounedjah with Al Sadd in 2019

Personal information
- Full name: Baghdad Bounedjah
- Date of birth: 24 November 1991 (age 34)
- Place of birth: Oran, Algeria
- Height: 1.84 m (6 ft 0 in)
- Position: Striker

Team information
- Current team: Al-Shamal
- Number: 11

Youth career
- –2009: RCG Oran

Senior career*
Years	Team	Apps	(Gls)
2009–2011	RCG Oran		
2011–2013	USM El Harrach	51	(16)
2013–2015	ES Sahel	61	(34)
2015–2024	Al Sadd	237	(208)
2024–	Al-Shamal	42	(29)

International career^{‡}
2011–2012	Algeria U23	5	(3)
2016	Algeria Olympic	3	(1)
2013–	Algeria	86	(35)
Medal record
Men's football
Representing Algeria
FIFA Arab Cup
Winner	2021 Qatar
Africa Cup of Nations
Winner	2019 Egypt
- * Club domestic league appearances and goals as of 31 August 2026 ‡ National team caps and goals as of 10 January 2026

Baghdad Saddam Bounedjah (Arabic: بَغْدَاد صَدَّام بُونَجَاح, born 24 November 1991) is an Algerian professional footballer who plays as a striker for Qatar Stars League club Al-Shamal and the Algeria national team.

Throughout his club career until 2015, Bounedjah played for Algerian sides RCG Oran and USM El Harrach, and Tunisian side Étoile du Sahel, before joining Qatari club Al Sadd in 2015. In the 2018–19 Qatar Stars League season, he scored a league record of 39 goals in one season, and was the world's leading goalscorer during the 2018 calendar year with 58 goals overall.

Baghdad Bounedjah made his senior debut for Algeria in 2013, and has represented his nation at the 2016 Summer Olympics, and five editions of the Africa Cup of Nations; he was a member of the squad that won the 2019 tournament, scoring the winning goal in the final.

== Club career ==
=== RCG Oran ===
Baghdad started his career in his native city with RCG Oran when he played in the all youth categories until he arrives in senior in 2009 when he played two seasons. In 2011, he joined USM El Harrach.

=== USM El Harrach ===
In the summer of 2011, Bounedjah signed a two-year contract with USM El Harrach, joining them from amateur club RCG Oran. On 10 September 2011, he made his professional debut for the club as a starter in the first-round game of the 2011–12 Algerian Ligue Professionnelle 1 against MC Oran, scoring a goal in the 78th minute.

=== Étoile du Sahel ===
In June 2013, Bounedjah joined with the club of Sousse, Étoile Sportive du Sahel, with which he signed a three-year contract. This transfer was made official a month later, when his former employer, who disputed this transfer. On 26 September 2013, He made his debut for the team in Tunisian Professional League 1 against US Monastir, also scored his first goal with the club. He quickly became an essential part of the ES Sahel, and finished top scorer in the 2014 Tunisian Professional League 1 in his first year, scoring 14 goals in 23 games. This earned him the extension of his initial three-year contract, an additional year, the link now to the club until June 2017. On 11 August 2013, Bounedjah, won his first title with Étoile du Sahel. The Algerian striker offered the 2013–14 Tunisian Cup to his club at the expense of CS Sfaxien, in the final at Rades. In the second season, Bounedjah continued to shine and On 25 September 2014, scored his first hat-trick in Tunisian Ligue Pro 1 against EGS Gafsa in 3–0 victory to finish the Professional League 1 with 11 goals in second place the same thing with Étoile du Sahel where they failed to win the championship, two points behind Club Africain. But again he won the Tunisian Cup for the second time in a row, this time against Stade Gabèsien and scored Bounedjah a hat-trick. Then continued to shine and this time in the CAF Confederation Cup and thus contributed to the victory of Étoile du Sahel title and achieved at the same time the title of the top scorer.

=== Al Sadd ===
==== 2015–16 season ====
On 29 April 2015, Bounedjah moved to Qatar's Al Sadd, but he remained at Étoile du Sahel for a six-month loan period. Indeed, the Qatari club having already reached its quota of foreign players, decided to leave the player on loan to the Sahelian training for the first part of the season before returning to his workforce. During his loan, Bounedjah was seriously injured. Ankle injury which kept him out for nearly three months On 7 March 2016, He made his debut for the team in Qatar Stars League against Al-Gharafa, later Bounedjah scored the winning goal against Al-Kharaitiyat his first goal with the club. and with the end of a difficult season for him and his team participated only in ten games and scored seven goals in all competitions.

==== 2016–17 season ====
In his second season and On 7 December 2016, Bounedjah scored his first hat-trick in Qatar Stars League against Al-Rayyan in 5–0 victory. reaching 13 goals in Qatar for that season. Later, on 16 February 2017 Bounedjah scored another hat trick, this time against Al-Arabi In this match, Bounedjah scored five goals for the first time in his career. At the end of the season, his team failed to win the league title, two points behind Lekhwiya, but he achieved the title of the top goalscorer in the Qatari Stars league with 24 goals alongside Lekhwiya's Youssef El-Arabi. With the end of the league, Bounedjah won his first title Qatar Crown Prince Cup after winning the final against El Jaish and also scored a goal. Bounedjah achieve his second title by winning the Emir of Qatar Cup against Al-Rayyan. before this final, in the quarter-finals Bounedjah scored a super-hat trick against Al-Kharaitiyat. As a result, Bounedjah finished the season with 30 goals. On 23 May 2017, After his big season he decided to extend his contract, which was due to end in 2018, for three seasons until 2021.

==== 2017–18 season ====
At the start of his third season at Al Sadd, the 2017–18 campaign On 9 September 2017, First game of the season, first "hat trick" and first title for Bounedjah, during the Qatar Super Cup after beating league champion last season, Al-Duhail 4–1. with the start of the league Bounedjah was aspiring to win the title and the start was good where he scored in six consecutive games until the match against Al-Duhail and defeat 4–2, after this game was exposed again, a difficult injury Shin fracture and kept him out for more than two months, This injury prevented him from competing for the title of goal scorer against his opponent last season Youssef El-Arabi, and after returning from injury and only in five matches Bounedjah scored ten goals in Qatar Stars League including a super-hat trick against Al-Ahli The fourth goal is the 50 in all competitions with Al Sadd. In the AFC Champions League and after a seven-year absence from the group stage Al-Sadd placed its focus on it, as well as Bounedjah Where he was remarkably successful scoring nine goals in eight games, Including four binaries against Al-Wasl back and forth, Persepolis and Al-Ahli in the Round of 16. To finish the season strongly with 28 goals in all competitions.

==== 2018–19 season ====
On 5 August 2018, Bounedjah scored a hat-trick in the first game of the season against Al-Kharaitiyat one week later, Bounedjah broke the Qatar Stars League single-game goal record, scoring seven goals in a 10–1 win against Al Arabi. Bounedjah continued his success at the individual level by winning the top scorer of the 2018 AFC Champions League with 13 goals to become the first Algerian and the first player from a Qatari club to achieve this award. The Al-Sadd forward matched the all-time single tournament record held by Muriqui who netted the same tally by the conclusion of Guangzhou Evergrande's 2013 campaign. despite failing to reach the final after a semi-final elimination against Persepolis. And continue to pursue and score goals with the club and the national team and his arrival at the barrier 50 goals in 2018, newspapers in Qatar and Europe spoke about the offer from Olympique Marseille to the Algerian star in the winter transfer. Bounedjah said that, "if I get an offer from a good club I will leave Al Sadd but if it's the opposite I'll stay here". On 2 December 2018, Bounedjah scored another hat-trick, his fourth for the season and this time against Al-Gharafa in 8–1 victory. On 7 December 2018, Bounedjah set a new top goalscorer record for the Qatar Stars League with 28 goals after just 14 matches, breaking the record previously held by Brazilian striker Clemerson de Araújo, who scored 27 goals in 2007–08.

By the end of 2018, Bounedjah managed to beat several stars such as Cristiano Ronaldo and Lionel Messi as the world's top scorer after reaching goal 58, including 29 in Qatar Stars League this season, ten last season in the same competition, 13 in the Champions League and seven with the Algeria national team. Bounedjah is also the first Algerian to have scored a total of 50 goals in a year and far ahead of his teammates in the selection Islam Slimani or Riyad Mahrez and even Nacer Bouiche who had exceeded 40 goals in 1986 with JS Kabylie. On 28 December 2018, Bounedjah decided to renew his contract until 2024 despite the offers he received from several European clubs. With the start of the new year, Bounedjah won another individual award, this time the best Algerian player of 2018, ahead of his teammates Riyad Mahrez and Yacine Brahimi, The award was conferred by the Brazilian star Roberto Carlos. Bounedjah is the first footballer based outside Europe and Algeria to win the award. On 23 February 2019, Bounedjah scored in the Qatari Classico against Al-Rayyan, bringing his tally with Al Sadd to 100 goal in all competitions, making him the first Algerian player based outside of Europe to claim this accolade with a single club. On 4 April 2019, Bounedjah scored his sixth hat-trick of the season (and 39th goal in total - a league record) against Al-Ahli to lead Al Sadd SC to win their first Qatar Stars League title in six seasons, is also the first league title for Bounedjah in its history.

==== 2019–20 season ====
After the end of the Africa Cup of Nations, Bounedjah cut off his holiday early to prepare for the new league season, which had an early start. On 13 August 2019, Bounedjah and his team qualified for the quarter-finals of the AFC Champions League after winning against rivals Al-Duhail; he registered an assist for Akram Afif in the second leg. After missing two games because of the penalty and in his first Qatar Stars League match against Al-Shahania he scored four goals in the 7–1 win. On 11 December, he scored the first goal at the 2019 FIFA Club World Cup and earned the Man of the Match award for his performance in his side's 3–1 First Round win over 2019 OFC Champions League winners Hienghène Sport in extra time. He ultimately scored a tournament-high three goals as Al-Sadd ended sixth.

==== 2020–21 season ====
The start of the season was late due to the COVID-19 pandemic in Qatar and from the tournaments that have been postponed to this season the 2020 Emir of Qatar Cup, Bounedjah led his club to win the title where he scored the two winning goals in the final against Al-Arabi which is his second title in the same competition. On 23 December 2020, Bounedjah scored the 100th goal in the Qatar Stars League by scoring the winning goal against Al-Rayyan. On 7 January 2021, Bounedjah scored his first hat-trick of the season against Al-Sailiya in 8–0 victory and provided two assists. Five days later Bounedjah scored another hat-trick against defending champions Al-Duhail in a 3–1 win.

On 26 February 2021, in the final of the Qatar Cup, Bounedjah scored twice in Al Sadd's win over Al-Duhail. In the Qatar Stars League and after winning against Umm Salal with a score of 3–0, Bounedjah scored a goal which secured the club's 15th league title. He ended the season as the league's top scorer, with 21 goals; it was his third time winning the QSL golden boot.

== International career ==
In September 2011, Bounedjah was called by Azzedine Aït Djoudi up to the Algeria under-23 national team. He participated with the team in a pair of friendlies against USM Blida and NA Hussein Dey.

On 4 October 2011, Bounedjah received a surprise call-up to the Algeria national team from Vahid Halilhodžić for the 2012 Africa Cup of Nations qualifier against Central African Republic, replacing the injured Rafik Djebbour. On 16 November 2011, he was selected as part of Algeria's squad for the 2011 CAF U-23 Championship in Morocco.

Bounedjah scored the only goal for Algeria against Senegal in the 2nd minute of the 2019 Africa Cup of Nations final in Egypt, from a shot that took a massive deflection off Senegalese defender Salif Sané, in a match that ended with a 1–0 win for Algeria.

In December 2023, he was named in Algeria's squad for the 2023 Africa Cup of Nations. He scored the opening goal against Angola on 15 January 2024, in Ivory Coast.

== Career statistics ==
=== Club ===
Baghdad Bounedjah was formed in RCG Oran, he played with the club until 2011 when he joined USM El Harrach who played in Ligue 1 Professional.

As of match played 31 August 2026

Appearances and goals by club, season and competition
Club	Season	League			National cup (Note: Includes Algerian Cup, Tunisian Cup, Qatar Emir Cup)		Continental		Other		Total	
Club	Season	Division	Apps	Goals	Apps	Goals	Apps	Goals	Apps	Goals	Apps	Goals
USM El Harrach	2011–12	Algerian Ligue 1	20	6	5	1	—		—		25	7
USM El Harrach	2012–13	Algerian Ligue 1	28	10	1	1	—		—		29	11
USM El Harrach	Total		48	16	6	2	—		—		54	18
Étoile du Sahel	2013–14	Tunisian Ligue 1	24	14	2	1	2 (Note: Appearances in CAF Confederation Cup)	2	—		28	17
Étoile du Sahel	2014–15	Tunisian Ligue 1	23	11	4	6	12	7	—		39	24
Étoile du Sahel	2015–16	Tunisian Ligue 1	2	1	—		7	4	—		9	5
Étoile du Sahel	Total		49	26	6	7	21	13	—		76	46
Al Sadd	2015–16	Qatar Stars League	6	3	3	4	—		1 (Note: Appearance in Qatar Crown Prince Cup)	0	10	7
Al Sadd	2016–17	Qatar Stars League	20	24	3	5	1 (Note: Appearance(s) in AFC Champions League)	0	1	1	25	30
Al Sadd	2017–18	Qatar Stars League	11	16	0	0	8	9	3 (Note: One appearance and three goals in Qatari Super Cup, two appearances in Qatar Crown Prince Cup)	3	22	28
Al Sadd	2018–19	Qatar Stars League	22	39	3	3	10	6	—		35	48
Al Sadd	2019–20	Qatar Stars League	21	14	2	3	7	1	7 (Note: Three appearances and three goals in FIFA Club World Cup, two appearances and two goals in Qatar Crown Prince Cup)	8	38	26
Al Sadd	2020–21	Qatar Stars League	19	21	4	6	10	5	2	2	35	34
Al Sadd	2021–22	Qatar Stars League	17	13	3	1	3	0	0	0	23	14
Al Sadd	2022–23	Qatar Stars League	22	12	4	3	0	0	6 (Note: Four appearances in Qatari Stars Cup, two appearance and two goals in Qatar Crown Prince Cup)	5	30	20
Al Sadd	2023–24	Qatar Stars League	20	8	4	2	6	5	6	4 (Note: Appearances in Arab Club Champions Cup)	36	16
Al Sadd	Total		157	150	26	27	45	26	24	20	252	223
Al-Shamal	2024–25	Qatar Stars League	21	18	2	1	—		0	0	23	19
Al-Shamal	2025–26	Qatar Stars League	19	9	4	2	—		0	0	23	11
Al-Shamal	2026-27	Qatar Stars League	2	2							2	2
Al-Shamal	Total		42	29	6	3	—		—		48	32
Career total			296	221	46	39	59	39	24	20	425	319

=== International ===
As of match played 10 January 2026

Appearances and goals by national team and year
National team	Year	Apps	Goals
Algeria	2013	1	0
Algeria	2014	1	0
Algeria	2015	4	0
Algeria	2016	1	0
Algeria	2017	5	1
Algeria	2018	9	7
Algeria	2019	14	8
Algeria	2020	3	1
Algeria	2021	16	7
Algeria	2022	4	0
Algeria	2023	5	2
Algeria	2024	13	6
Algeria	2025	8	3
Algeria	2026	2	0
Total		86	35

Scores and results list Algeria's goal tally first, score column indicates score after each Bounedjah goal.

List of international goals scored by Baghdad Bounedjah
No.	Date	Venue	Opponent	Score	Result	Competition
1	7 January 2017	Mustapha Tchaker Stadium, Blida, Algeria	Mauritania	2–1	3–1	Friendly
2	22 March 2018	Stade du 5 Juillet, Algiers, Algeria	Tanzania	1–0	4–1	Friendly
3	22 March 2018	Stade du 5 Juillet, Algiers, Algeria	Tanzania	4–1	4–1	Friendly
4	1 June 2018	Stade du 5 Juillet, Algiers, Algeria	Cape Verde	2–1	2–3	Friendly
5	8 September 2018	Independence Stadium, Bakau, Gambia	Gambia	1–0	1–1	2019 Africa Cup of Nations qualification
6	12 October 2018	Mustapha Tchaker Stadium, Blida, Algeria	Benin	2–0	2–0	2019 Africa Cup of Nations qualification
7	18 November 2018	Stade Municipal, Lomé, Togo	Togo	4–1	4–1	2019 Africa Cup of Nations qualification
8	27 December 2018	Khalifa International Stadium, Doha, Qatar	Qatar	1–0	1–0	Friendly
9	26 March 2019	Mustapha Tchaker Stadium, Blida, Algeria	Tunisia	1–0	1–0	Friendly
10	11 June 2019	Jassim bin Hamad Stadium, Doha, Qatar	Burundi	1–0	1–1	Friendly
11	16 June 2019	Khalifa International Stadium, Doha, Qatar	Mali	1–1	3–2	Friendly
12	23 June 2019	30 June Stadium, Cairo, Egypt	Kenya	1–0	2–0	2019 Africa Cup of Nations
13	19 July 2019	Cairo International Stadium, Cairo, Egypt	Senegal	1–0	1–0	2019 Africa Cup of Nations final
14	15 October 2019	Stade Pierre-Mauroy, Lille, France	Colombia	1–0	3–0	Friendly
15	14 November 2019	Mustapha Tchaker Stadium, Blida, Algeria	Zambia	2–0	5–0	2021 Africa Cup of Nations qualification
16	14 November 2019	Mustapha Tchaker Stadium, Blida, Algeria	Zambia	5–0	5–0	2021 Africa Cup of Nations qualification
17	12 November 2020	Stade du 5 Juillet, Algiers, Algeria	Zimbabwe	1–0	3–1	2021 Africa Cup of Nations qualification
18	29 March 2021	Mustapha Tchaker Stadium, Blida, Algeria	Botswana	4–0	5–0	2021 Africa Cup of Nations qualification
19	3 June 2021	Mustapha Tchaker Stadium, Blida, Algeria	Mauritania	4–1	4–1	Friendly
20	11 June 2021	Stade Olympique de Radès, Radès, Tunisia	Tunisia	1–0	2–0	Friendly
21	2 September 2021	Mustapha Tchaker Stadium, Blida, Algeria	Djibouti	4–0	8–0	2022 FIFA World Cup qualification
22	12 October 2021	Stade Général Seyni Kountché, Niamey, Niger	Niger	4–0	4–0	2022 FIFA World Cup qualification
23	1 December 2021	Ahmed bin Ali Stadium, Al Rayyan, Qatar	Sudan	1–0	4–0	2021 FIFA Arab Cup
24	1 December 2021	Ahmed bin Ali Stadium, Al Rayyan, Qatar	Sudan	2–0	4–0	2021 FIFA Arab Cup
25	27 March 2023	Stade Olympique de Radès, Radès, Tunisia	Niger	1–0	1–0	2023 Africa Cup of Nations qualification
26	16 November 2023	Nelson Mandela Stadium, Algiers, Algeria	Somalia	2–0	3–1	2026 FIFA World Cup qualification
27	9 January 2024	Stade de Kégué, Lomé, Togo	Burundi	1–0	4–0	Friendly
28	15 January 2024	Stade de la Paix, Bouaké, Ivory Coast	Angola	1–0	1–1	2023 Africa Cup of Nations
29	20 January 2024	Stade de la Paix, Bouaké, Ivory Coast	Burkina Faso	1–1	2–2	2023 Africa Cup of Nations
30	20 January 2024	Stade de la Paix, Bouaké, Ivory Coast	Burkina Faso	2–2	2–2	2023 Africa Cup of Nations
31	10 September 2024	Samuel Kanyon Doe Sports Complex, Monrovia, Liberia	Liberia	3–0	3–0	2025 Africa Cup of Nations qualification
32	17 November 2024	Hocine Aït Ahmed Stadium, Tizi Ouzou, Algeria	Liberia	3–1	5–1	2025 Africa Cup of Nations qualification
33	4 September 2025	Hocine Aït Ahmed Stadium, Tizi Ouzou, Algeria	Botswana	2–1	3–1	2026 FIFA World Cup qualification
34	4 September 2025	Hocine Aït Ahmed Stadium, Tizi Ouzou, Algeria	Botswana	3–1	3–1	2026 FIFA World Cup qualification
35	13 November 2025	Prince Abdullah Al-Faisal Sports City Stadium, Jeddah, Saudi Arabia	Zimbabwe	1–0	3–1	Friendly

Scores and results list Algeria U23's goal tally first, score column indicates score after each Bounedjah goal.

List of international goals scored by Baghdad Bounedjah
No.	Date	Venue	Opponent	Score	Result	Competition
1	4 August 2016	Estádio Olímpico João Havelange, Rio de Janeiro, Brazil	Honduras U23	2–3	2–3	2016 Summer Olympics

== Honours ==
Étoile du Sahel

- Tunisian Cup: 2013–14, 2014–15
- CAF Confederation Cup: 2015

Al Sadd

- Qatar Stars League: 2018–19, 2020–21, 2021–22, 2023–24
- Qatar Cup: 2017, 2020, 2021
- Emir of Qatar Cup: 2017, 2020, 2021, 2024
- Sheikh Jassim Cup: 2017
- Qatari Stars Cup: 2019–20

Algeria

- Africa Cup of Nations: 2019
- FIFA Arab Cup: 2021

Individual

- Algerian Footballer of the Year: 2018
- Tunisian Ligue Pro 1 Top Scorer: 2013–14
- CAF Confederation Cup Top Scorer: 2015
- Qatar Stars League Player of the Month: August 2018, November/December 2018, January 2021, September 2021
- Qatar Stars League Top Scorer: 2018–19, 2020–21
- Qatar Stars League Team of the Year: 2017–18, 2018–19, 2019–20
- Emir of Qatar Cup Top Scorer: 2017
- AFC Champions League Top Scorer: 2018
- AFC Champions League Fans' Best XI: 2018
- AFC Champions League OPTA Best XI: 2018
- IFFHS World's Best Top Goal Scorer: 2018
- IFFHS World's Best International Goal Scorer: 2018
- IFFHS World's Best Top Division Goal Scorer: 2019
- FIFA Club World Cup Top Scorer: 2019
- CAF Team of the Year: 2015
- Goal Africa Team of the Year: 2018
- IFFHS CAF Men Team of The Year: 2021
