= Jasem Al-Hail =

Qatari footballer (born 1992)

Jasem Adel
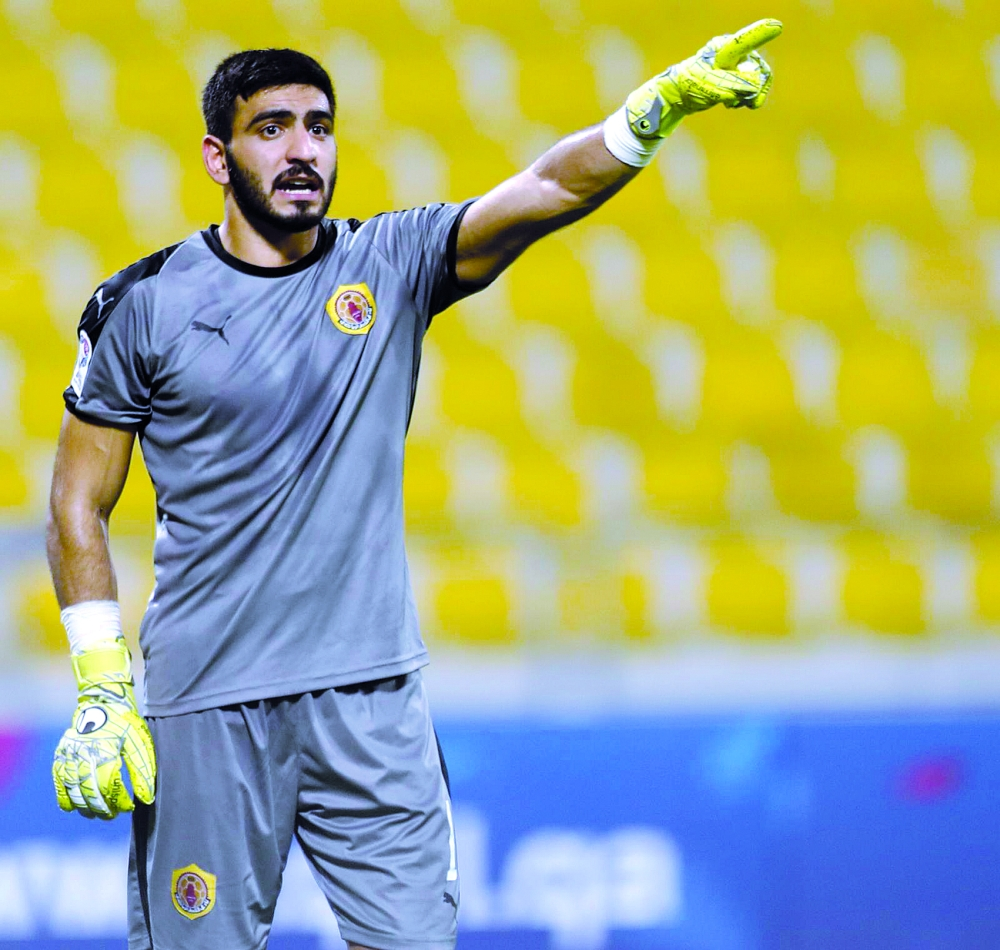
- Adel, 2019-2020 season

Personal information
- Full name: Jasem Adel Khalil Al-Hail
- Date of birth: 29 January 1992 (age 34)
- Place of birth: Qatar
- Height: 1.83 m (6 ft 0 in)
- Position: Goalkeeper

Team information
- Current team: Al-Arabi
- Number: 31

Senior career*
| Years | Team | Apps | (Gls) |
| 2013–2016 | Al-Markhiya | | |
| 2016–2017 | Al-Shahania | 7 | (0) |
| 2017–2022 | Qatar SC | 95 | (0) |
| 2022– | Al-Arabi | 51 | (0) |
- * Club domestic league appearances and goals as of 17 January 2026

Jasem Adel Al-Hail (Arabic:جاسم عادل الهيل) (born 29 January 1992) is a Qatari footballer who currently plays for Al-Arabi.

== Honours ==
=== Club ===
Al-Arabi

- Emir of Qatar Cup: 2023
