= Santi Cazorla =

Spanish footballer (born 1984)

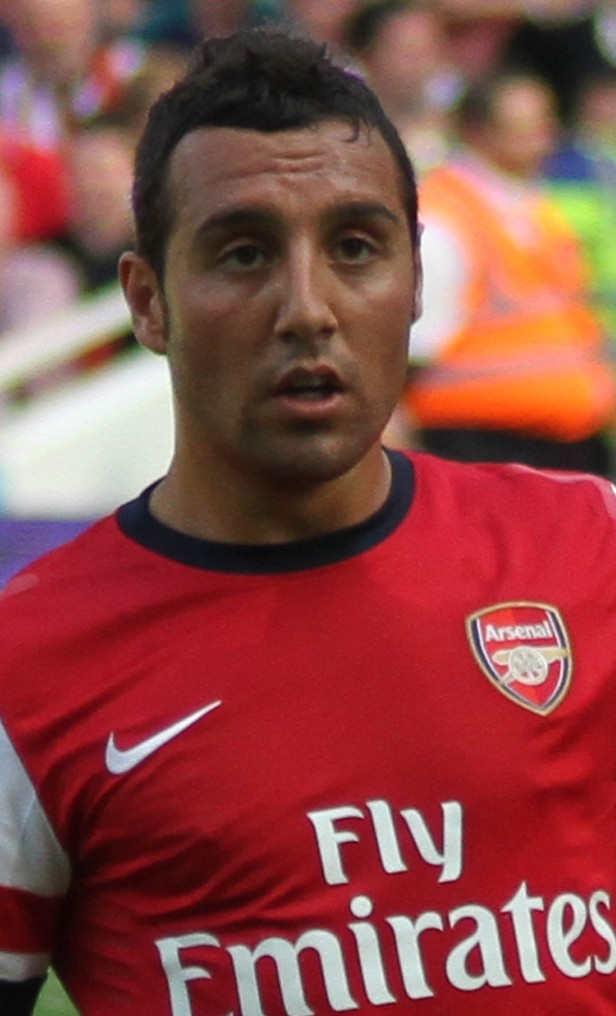
- Cazorla with Arsenal in 2012

Personal information
- Full name: Santiago Cazorla González
- Date of birth: 13 December 1984 (age 41)
- Place of birth: Llanera, Asturias, Spain
- Height: 1.67 m (5 ft 6 in)
- Position: Midfielder

Youth career
- 1992–1996: Covadonga
- 1996–2003: Oviedo

Senior career*
Years	Team	Apps	(Gls)
2003–2004	Villarreal B	40	(4)
2003–2006	Villarreal	54	(2)
2006–2007	Recreativo	34	(5)
2007–2011	Villarreal	127	(23)
2011–2012	Málaga	38	(9)
2012–2018	Arsenal	129	(25)
2018–2020	Villarreal	70	(15)
2020–2023	Al Sadd	55	(23)
2023–2026	Oviedo	84	(3)
Total		631	(109)

International career
2004–2006	Spain U21	7	(0)
2008–2019	Spain	81	(15)
Medal record
Men's Football
Representing Spain
UEFA European Championship
Winner	2008 Austria–Switzerland
Winner	2012 Poland–Ukraine
FIFA Confederations Cup
Runner-up	2013 Brazil
Third place	2009 South Africa
- * Club domestic league appearances and goals

Santiago Cazorla González (Spanish pronunciation: [sanˈtjaɣo ˈsanti kaˈθoɾla ɣonˈθaleθ]; (Note: In isolation, González is pronounced [ɡonˈθaleθ].) born 13 December 1984) is a Spanish former professional footballer. Cazorla operated primarily as an attacking midfielder, but also played as a winger, central midfielder or as a deep-lying playmaker.

Cazorla began his professional career at Villarreal in 2003 after impressing as a youngster with Oviedo, his hometown club, where he was forced to leave due to Oviedo's poor financial situation. He continued his development at Villarreal before a short spell at partner club, Recreativo de Huelva. He was Recreativo Huelva's standout player in the 2006–07 La Liga season, contributing to their top-ten finish and being awarded Spain's Footballer of the Year. He returned to Villarreal for €1.2 million the following season, becoming a key contributor to the side, regularly being named in the La Liga Team of the Season. In 2011, Cazorla moved to Málaga in a club-record €21 million deal, where he gained a reputation for his speed, shooting accuracy, capacity to change the rhythm of gameplay, and excellent close control.

After the 2011–12 season, coupled with Málaga's perilous financial situation, Cazorla moved to Premier League side Arsenal for a fee of £10 million, where he became a core component to the team in his first year at the club, registering thirteen assists, after which he was voted Arsenal Player of the Season, as well as becoming ranked one of the best footballers in Europe. Cazorla was integral in ending the club's nine-year trophy drought, scoring a crucial free-kick en route to winning the FA Cup final in 2014. Injuries plagued his latter years with Arsenal. In 2018, Cazorla returned to Villarreal; in his two seasons, he recorded his highest appearance, league goals and assist count since 2015. In 2020, he signed for Qatari club Al Sadd.

Having been strongly linked to Oviedo, as both a lifelong fan, and having bought a significant stake in the club to save it from bankruptcy in 2012, he returned in 2023 on the lowest financial contract possible as to help the club. He played a significant role in the club's return to the La Liga after 24 years in 2025.

Cazorla made his senior debut for Spain in a victory against Peru in May 2008, and was a semi-regular participant in the nation's triumphs at UEFA Euro 2008 and Euro 2012, as well as featuring at the 2014 FIFA World Cup. He scored his first international goal in a friendly match against Chile, and went on to amass 81 appearances and 15 goals for the national side.

== Club career ==
=== Real Oviedo: start of career ===
Born near Llanera, Asturias, Cazorla grew up supporting local team Real Oviedo, as did his whole family and surroundings.

He started playing club football for Oviedo aged 8.

Having seen the senior team relegated at 16, he was forced to leave having never played a first-team game, and was acquired by Villarreal, six months before turning 18, as Oviedo, immersed in a deep financial crisis, suffered two relegations at the end of the 2002–03 season which saw it land in Tercera División.

=== Villarreal ===
Cazorla progressed through Villarreal's reserve side in the Third Division, before making his debut with the first team on 30 November 2003 in a 1–0 La Liga win at Deportivo de La Coruña, playing one minute in place of Roger, making one more appearance off the bench over the season. He scored his first goal in a 3–0 win at Odense Boldklub in the 2004 UEFA Intertoto Cup, which the "Yellow Submarine" went on to win.

Established in the main squad in the 2004–05 campaign, Cazorla scored four goals in a run to the quarter-finals of the season's UEFA Cup. On 1 May 2005, given an opportunity due to Juan Román Riquelme's suspension, he scored his first league goal in a 4–0 win over Getafe at El Madrigal, and followed it a week later with a strike in a 2–0 victory at Málaga. After contributing to an eventual fourth-place finish, he also made two goalless appearances in the following season's UEFA Champions League, where Villarreal were semi-finalists.

=== Recreativo ===
On 7 July 2006, newly promoted Recreativo de Huelva signed Cazorla for €600,000 on a four-year deal, with a clause in his contract whereby he could return to Villarreal (for €1.2 million), going on to score in his official debut, a 1–1 home draw with Mallorca, on 27 August. The following 22 April, he dedicated a goal to his father, José Manuel, who had died recently, in a 4–2 home win against Racing de Santander; in the penultimate fixture on 10 June, he struck twice in a 5–2 win at Deportivo de La Coruña.

His performances helped the Andalusians finish eighth, and he was named Spain's Player of the Year according to Don Balón, a member of European Sports Magazines, after topping its rating list.

=== Return to Villarreal ===
The following year, Villarreal took advantage of the clause in Cazorla's contract and bought him back, as the team believed he had proven himself. In his first season in his second spell, he was instrumental in Villarreal's final runner-up placing, providing assists for Nihat Kahveci and Giuseppe Rossi and netting five goals himself.

On 26 August 2008, Cazorla announced that Real Madrid were interested in signing him. He then went on to cause a stir in the media by rejecting the team, announcing that, "There are many other things in football besides Real Madrid. It's clear that it is possible to say 'no' to them, there is no doubt that they are a great team, but I also feel very satisfied and valued at my club." He added, "I hope I can continue growing at Villarreal because I am young and I’m only starting off with the national team."

During a league game against Almería in early April 2009, Cazorla injured his right fibula after suffering a challenge from two opponents. He missed several games but el Submarino Amarillo still managed to qualify for the Europa League, as the player made his comeback earlier than expected in the side's final match, a 3–2 win at Mallorca, and finished the league campaign with a career-high eight goals.

Cazorla struggled heavily with injury in the 2009–10 season, going on to miss the 2010 World Cup. He returned to full fitness in the following campaign, only missing one game and scoring five times as Villarreal finished fourth and qualified to the Champions League.

=== Málaga ===
On 26 July 2011, Cazorla left Villarreal and returned to Andalusia to join high-spending Málaga for a fee of €21 million. He scored on his official debut on 28 August, netting from a superbly taken free kick in a 1–2 away loss against neighbouring Sevilla. On 12 September, he scored a brace and gave an assist in another local derby, a 4–0 home win against Granada, and netted his fourth in only four games nine days later – again from a free kick – in a 1–0 home success over Athletic Bilbao.

On 18 March 2012, Cazorla scored from an injury-time free kick in a 1–1 away draw against Real Madrid, and finished the season as the team's second top scorer (only behind Salomón Rondón) as Málaga finished fourth and qualified for the Champions League for the first time in the club's history.

=== Arsenal ===
On 7 August 2012, it was officially announced that Cazorla had signed a long-term deal with Premier League club Arsenal, worth £10 million. He became Arsène Wenger's third major signing of the summer after the arrivals of German attacker Lukas Podolski and French striker Olivier Giroud. Cazorla picked up the man of the match award on his debut for the club against Sunderland.

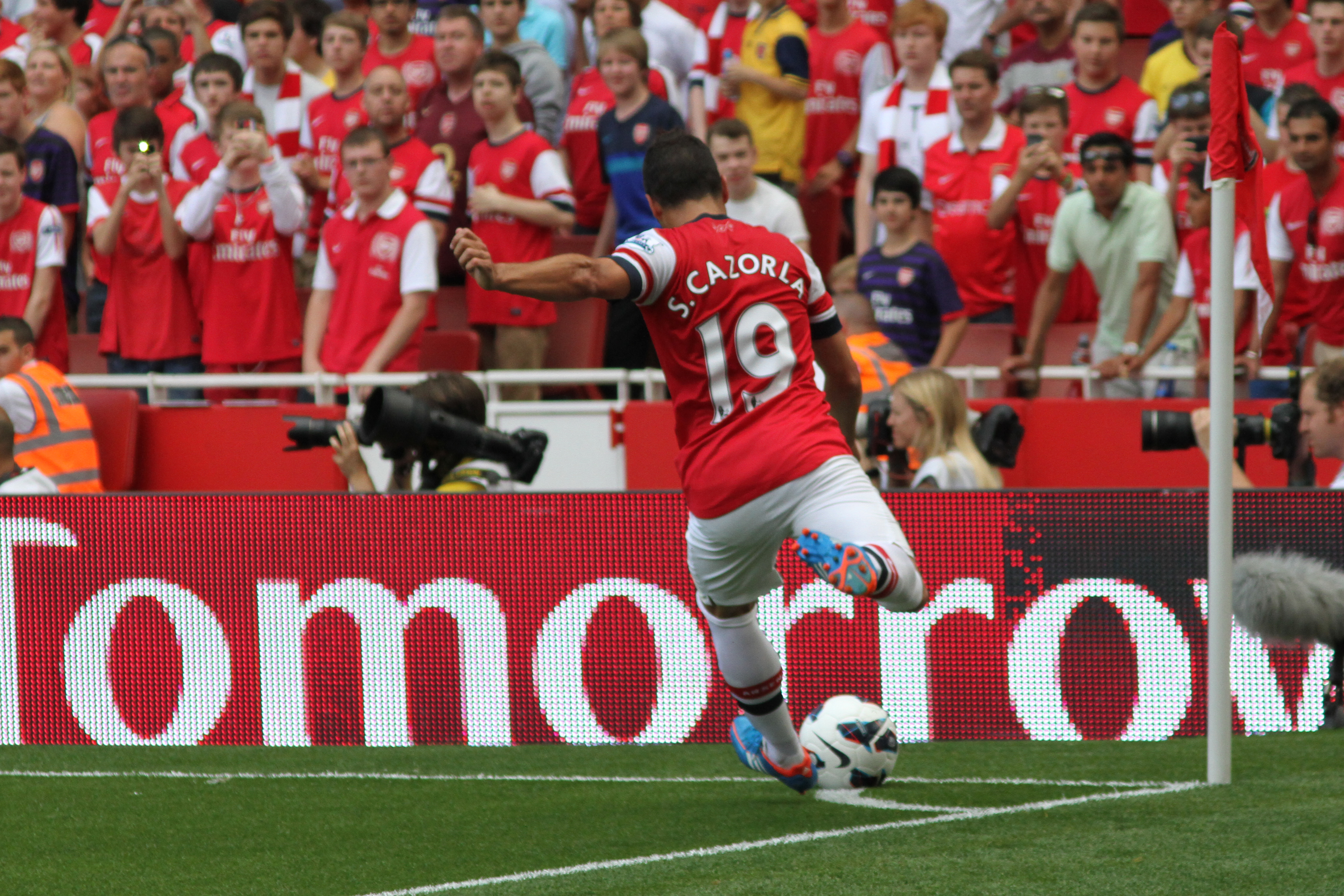
Cazorla taking a corner for Arsenal

He scored his first Arsenal goal in a 2–0 win against Liverpool at Anfield and scored his first hat-trick for the club against Reading, a performance that saw him pick up another man of the match award. Despite his successful start to the campaign, Cazorla was mired in controversy during the match against West Bromwich Albion, as he earned a penalty upon apparently being tripped by Steven Reid, which was converted to make it 1–0 in an eventual 2–0 home success. Television replays, however, showed that there had been no contact between Reid and Cazorla; this led to Wenger issuing an apology for Cazorla being awarded a penalty and suggesting that the Spaniard could face disciplinary action for going to ground too easily; the manager also revealed that the playmaker had told him that he "was touched, lost his balance".

On 14 May 2013, Cazorla assisted all four of Arsenal's goals in a vital 4–1 win over Wigan Athletic, which relegated their opponents and kept the Gunners in fourth place, with the eventual qualification to the Champions League. Cazorla finished an exceptional first season in England as the only Arsenal player to feature in all 38 league games, and on 31 May 2013, he was named Arsenal's Player of the Season for 2012–13. He ended his first season at Arsenal with 12 goals and 14 assists from 49 appearances. "I think he is a bit of an underrated player in the Premier League," Wenger told Arsenal. "When you think he was not in the [PFA] team of the season picked by the players, it's quite harsh. Personally I would have put him in there."

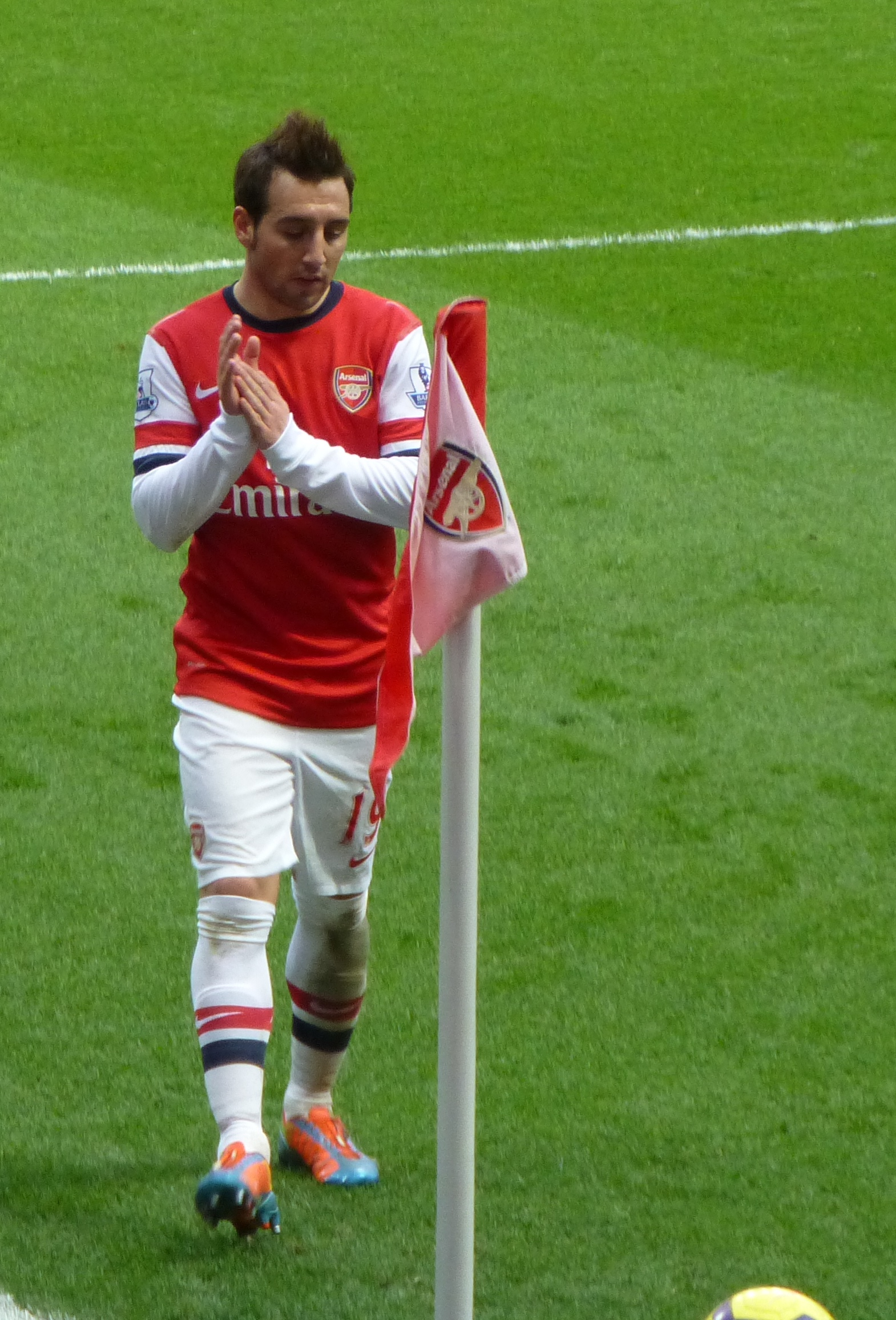
Cazorla preparing to take a corner against Sunderland in a Premier League match on 22 February 2014

Cazorla returned to pre-season training a few weeks later than normal after his involvement in the Confederations Cup for Spain. He started from the bench against Aston Villa but was introduced at half-time after Alex Oxlade-Chamberlain's injury. He played in every minute of Arsenal's games after that and played an important part in the side's three-straight wins early on in the season. The Spaniard picked up an ankle injury in September before the Sunderland game that kept him out of action for the rest of the month. On 30 November 2013, Cazorla made his 300th career top-flight league appearance, when he started for Arsenal in a 3–0 win against Cardiff City.

Cazorla produced a string of sparkling performances in January. He thumped home Arsenal's first against Tottenham before scoring a brace in the win at home to Fulham. The goals kept coming for the 29-year-old with further strikes against Coventry City and Southampton. Cazorla played every minute of Arsenal's seven fixtures in March and committed his long-term future to Arsenal by signing a new contract.

Cazorla tucked home the winning penalty in the shootout against Wigan to send Arsenal to the final of the FA Cup at Wembley Stadium. The Spaniard also added to his assist tally when his corner was headed home by Giroud against West Brom and scored Arsenal's first goal – a direct free-kick – as the team came from 2–0 down to defeat Hull City 3–2 in the 2014 FA Cup Final, winning his first piece of silverware with the club. He finished the campaign with 7 goals and 47 appearances in all competitions.

Cazorla began the 2014–15 campaign with another goal at Wembley, slotting home Arsenal's opener against Manchester City in the 2014 FA Community Shield. On 30 May 2015, Cazorla was selected to start in the 2015 FA Cup Final, playing the full 90 minutes and being voted man of the match in a 4–0 defeat of Aston Villa at Wembley. He finished the Premier League season with 11 assists, the second-highest in the League behind Chelsea's Cesc Fàbregas, and seven goals.

Cazorla began the 2015–16 season strongly, featuring in every match for Arsenal from the start of the campaign, with analysis showing him to be the league's busiest and most accurate passer. However, on 30 November 2015 he suffered a knee injury in a match against Norwich City and was ruled out for at least three months. In fact he did not return to the team until the last matchday on 15 May 2016, when he was named as player of the match in a 4–0 win over relegated Aston Villa which secured runners-up spot for the Gunners.

At the outset of 2016–17 Cazorla was once again an important player for Arsenal, making 11 appearances and scoring twice, before he injured his right Achilles tendon during a Champions League fixture against Ludogorets Razgrad on 19 October 2016, sustaining the injury from a challenge while providing an assist for a Mesut Özil goal in the 6–0 victory. Standard rehabilitation did not prove effective and in December it was confirmed that he would require surgery. He eventually endured eight operations on the problem (the ankle originally having been damaged playing for Spain in 2013), and contracted gangrene on the affected area with the infection 'eating' part of the tendon. It had been feared that he could be unable to walk again or could even lose the affected leg. The condition required antibiotic treatment and a skin graft, with the skin sourced from Cazorla's left forearm where a tattoo of his daughter's name had featured. He temporarily relocated to Salamanca to complete a further recovery programme, with the aim of returning to play football in 2018; after further operations, however, this was revised to 2019.

With his contract ending at the end of the 2017–18 season, it was announced that Cazorla would be leaving Arsenal. In 2020, he voiced his desire to return to Arsenal for a farewell match.

=== Second return to Villarreal ===
After his departure from Arsenal, Cazorla spent a brief period training with the youth team at Alavés. He then returned to former club Villarreal in order to train with them during the rest of the pre-season period and prove his fitness. He played his first game in 636 days when he appeared in a friendly against Hércules. He came on as a substitute in the 57th minute to a standing ovation. On 9 August 2018, his signing was officially announced by the club.

Cazorla scored his team's second goal in a 5–1 thrashing of Real Betis on 27 September 2019. With this goal, he became the highest-scoring midfielder in Villarreal's history with 46 goals, a record previously held by Juan Román Riquelme. He ended the season with 10 assists, the third-most in the league.

On 19 July 2020, Cazorla made his last appearance for Villarreal, in a 4–0 league win over Eibar. Before being substituted in the 82nd minute of the match, he assisted the opening goal, which was scored by André-Frank Zambo Anguissa. He ended the season with 11 goals (joint 10th most) and 9 assists (the third-most) in the league. Cazorla was given a guard of honour by teammates and opponents as he exited the pitch. Across his three spells at the club he made 334 appearances (251 in the league) and scored 57 goals (40 in the league).

=== Al Sadd ===
On 20 July 2020, Al Sadd confirmed that Cazorla joined the club to play under his former teammate Xavi. On 30 August, Cazorla scored on his debut match in a Qatari Stars Cup semi-final win against Al Ahli. This followed with a brace four days later on the 2020–21 QSL matchday one fixture against Al-Kharaitiyat. He was released on a free transfer after the 2022–23 season, having won 6 trophies and being their player of the season in the 2020–21 QSL season.

=== Return to Real Oviedo ===
On 16 August 2023, Cazorla returned to his first club, Real Oviedo, on a one-year contract. Initially wanting to play for free, he was prevented from doing so by employment rules, therefore it was announced that he would receive the minimum salary, 91,000 euros a season. He also stipulated that all proceeds from 10% of all his shirt sales go to the club's academy. On 11 June 2025, he netted a goal in a 1–1 draw against Almería, helping his team advance to the promotion play-offs final for a place in La Liga by winning 3–2 on aggregate. In the final against Mirandés, he converted a penalty in a 3–1 extra-time victory in the second leg, playing a key role in securing his team's return to the top division after 24 years.

On 12 July 2025, 40-year-old Cazorla signed a new one-year deal with the Carbayones. He announced his retirement from professional football on 2 July 2026, having made 28 appearances in La Liga and recorded one assist during his final season, as his club was relegated to the Segunda División.

== International career ==
=== Early international career ===
Cazorla began his international career in the Spain under-21 team, under Iñaki Sáez. He was called up for play-off games against Italy for the 2004 Summer Olympics, playing the first match which ended 0–1 – coming in on the 77th minute for Javier Arizmendi – but missing the second leg as the country ended up not qualifying for the competition. Despite success at club level, he had struggled to start regularly for Spain during their successful run under Vicente del Bosque.

On 17 May 2008, senior team coach Luis Aragonés surprised the Spanish press by including the uncapped Cazorla and Sergio García in his UEFA Euro 2008 squad, over more established wingers such as Joaquín and Albert Riera. Justifying the decision, Aragonés stated, "They are players [Cazorla and García] who are performing very well and had the possibility of coming. I made myself decide between Riera and Cazorla where I considered each player's form."

Cazorla debuted for the Spanish senior team on 31 May 2008 in a 2–1 friendly victory against Peru. He also made substitute appearances in the tournament's group stage matches against Russia, Sweden and Greece, also coming from the bench in the quarterfinals against Italy, converting his penalty in the ensuing shootout which Spain won. In the final, Cazorla played the last 25 minutes for David Silva, as Spain defeated Germany 1–0 and helped his country in winning their first major tournament in 44 years.

On 19 November 2008, Cazorla scored his first international goal in a friendly match against Chile at his club's home ground, which ended in a 3–0 victory for the Spaniards. He was summoned for the following year's FIFA Confederations Cup, where he made some of substitute appearances.

=== 2010s ===
After missing the 2010 FIFA World Cup due to a hernia, Cazorla returned to the national team's setup. On 4 June 2011 – during the first half of a friendly match against the United States in Foxborough, Massachusetts – he scored twice in a 4–0 victory.

Cazorla was selected by Vicente del Bosque for Euro 2012 in Poland and Ukraine. He played ten minutes against Ireland (4–0 group stage win) and six against France (2–0, quarterfinals) for the eventual champions.

Cazorla was named in Spain's 30-man provisional squad for the 2014 FIFA World Cup, having been included in the final list for the competition as well. On 19 June, he made his debut in the tournament by coming on for the last 14 minutes in place of Pedro against Chile at Maracanã in the second group game. Spain lost 2–0 and were eliminated. Cazorla started the dead rubber third match, a victory against Australia.

On 9 October 2015, Cazorla scored twice in a 4–0 UEFA Euro 2016 qualifying victory against Luxembourg at the Estadio Las Gaunas in Logroño, sending Spain to Euro 2016. He played and scored in a friendly victory against England the following month, but was not selected for the Euro 2016 finals squad having just come back from injury, and did not feature for his country in 2016 or 2017 due to further long-term injury problems.

Having overcome his injury problems and returned to playing regularly at Villarreal, Cazorla was recalled to the Spain squad for upcoming UEFA Euro 2020 qualification fixtures in May 2019. On 7 June, he made his first appearance for Spain since November 2015, a gap of 1302 days, starting in a 4–1 UEFA Euro 2020 qualifying victory against Faroe Islands. It was also a milestone occasion for Cazorla, as he served as captain of the national team for the first time in the second half of the match, assuming the armband following the substitution of regular captain Sergio Ramos.

== Style of play ==
A hard-working, versatile, and technical two-footed player, Cazorla primarily operated as an attacking midfielder, but could also play as a winger on either side of the pitch, as a central midfielder, or even as a deep-lying playmaker. In his prime, his main traits were his speed, creativity, shot accuracy particularly from outside the box, capacity to change the rhythm of gameplay in midfield, crossing ability, and passing, which allowed him to set the tempo and dictate play in midfield, cut inside from the flank, link up with teammates, make runs into the penalty area, and either create chances or score goals. A diminutive player, he also possessed excellent close control, a low centre of gravity, and quick feet, as well as the dribbling skills which allowed him to retain the ball in tight spaces. He was also accurate from set pieces, and because of his two footedness he would usually switch foot depending on which side of the pitch he was taking a corner or free kick from. (Note: See) Despite his ability, however, he often struggled with injuries throughout his career.

== Personal life ==
Cazorla was born in a small village called Fonciello, in the parish of Lugo de Llanera, near Llanera, Asturias, 10 minutes outside Oviedo. He is the son of Jose Manuel Cazorla, an ambulance driver who died in 2007, also a lifelong fan of local club Real Oviedo. Cazorla's brother Nando was also a youth player and fan of Oviedo.

Cazorla has three dogs, one of which is named Zlatan after the Swedish footballer.

He has a son, Enzo, and a daughter, India; their names were tattooed on his forearms, which he would kiss after scoring goals, although the design on his left arm was ruined in 2017 when the skin was needed for use as a graft over his infected right heel.

Cazorla's childhood footballing hero was Danish great Michael Laudrup.

In November 2012, along with fellow Premier League stars Michu and Juan Mata, he bought shares in his former club Oviedo as they struggled to raise €2 million to stay afloat in Spain's third division.

== Career statistics ==
=== Club ===
Appearances and goals by club, season and competition
Club	Season	League			National cup (Note: Includes Copa del Rey, FA Cup and Emir of Qatar Cup)		League cup (Note: Includes Football League/EFL Cup and Qatari Stars Cup)		Continental		Other		Total	
Club	Season	Division	Apps	Goals	Apps	Goals	Apps	Goals	Apps	Goals	Apps	Goals	Apps	Goals
Villarreal	2003–04	La Liga	2	0	0	0	—		—		—		2	0
Villarreal	2004–05	La Liga	29	2	1	0	—		18 (Note: Seven appearances and one goal in UEFA Intertoto Cup, eleven appearances and four goals in UEFA Cup)	5	—		48	7
Villarreal	2005–06	La Liga	23	0	0	0	—		2 (Note: Appearances in UEFA Champions League)	0	—		25	0
Villarreal	Total		54	2	1	0	—		20	5	—		75	7
Recreativo Huelva	2006–07	La Liga	34	5	0	0	—		—		—		34	5
Villarreal	2007–08	La Liga	36	5	6	0	—		7 (Note: Appearances in UEFA Cup)	1	—		49	6
Villarreal	2008–09	La Liga	30	8	1	0	—		8	0	—		39	8
Villarreal	2009–10	La Liga	24	5	2	0	—		4 (Note: Appearances in UEFA Europa League)	1	—		30	6
Villarreal	2010–11	La Liga	37	5	4	1	—		14	2	—		55	8
Villarreal	Total		127	23	13	1	—		33	4	—		173	28
Málaga	2011–12	La Liga	38	9	4	0	—		—		—		42	9
Arsenal	2012–13	Premier League	38	12	3	0	1	0	7	0	—		49	12
Arsenal	2013–14	Premier League	31	4	6	3	1	0	8	0	—		46	7
Arsenal	2014–15	Premier League	37	7	5	0	1	0	9	0	1 (Note: Appearance in FA Community Shield)	1	53	8
Arsenal	2015–16	Premier League	15	0	0	0	0	0	5	0	1	0	21	0
Arsenal	2016–17	Premier League	8	2	0	0	0	0	3	0	—		11	2
Arsenal	2017–18	Premier League	0	0	0	0	0	0	0	0	0	0	0	0
Arsenal	Total		129	25	14	3	3	0	32	0	2	1	180	29
Villarreal	2018–19	La Liga	35	4	1	1	—		10	2	—		46	7
Villarreal	2019–20	La Liga	35	11	5	4	—		—		—		40	15
Villarreal	Total		70	15	6	5	—		10	2	—		86	22
Al Sadd	2020–21	Qatar Stars League	20	13	5	2	4	3	10 (Note: Appearances in AFC Champions League)	4	2 (Note: Appearances in Qatar Cup)	1	41	23
Al Sadd	2021–22	Qatar Stars League	16	6	3	0	0	0	6	1	0	0	25	7
Al Sadd	2022–23	Qatar Stars League	19	4	4	3	6	2	—		2	0	31	9
Al Sadd	Total		55	23	12	5	10	5	16	5	4	1	97	39
Oviedo	2023–24	Segunda División	24	0	1	0	—		—		1 (Note: Appearance(s) in Segunda División promotion play-offs)	0	26	0
Oviedo	2024–25	Segunda División	32	3	0	0	—		—		3	2	35	5
Oviedo	2025–26	La Liga	28	0	0	0	—		—		—		28	0
Oviedo	Total		84	3	1	0	—		—		4	2	89	5
Career total			591	105	51	14	13	5	111	16	10	3	776	143

=== International ===
Appearances and goals by national team and year
National team	Year	Apps	Goals
Spain	2008	13	1
Spain	2009	11	1
Spain	2010	5	0
Spain	2011	10	2
Spain	2012	11	4
Spain	2013	11	3
Spain	2014	8	0
Spain	2015	8	3
Spain	2016	0	0
Spain	2017	0	0
Spain	2018	0	0
Spain	2019	4	1
Total		81	15

Scores and results lists Spain's goal tally first.

List of international goals scored by Santi Cazorla
No.	Date	Venue	Opponent	Score	Result	Competition
1.	19 November 2008	El Madrigal, Villarreal, Spain	Chile	3–0	3–0	Friendly
2.	9 September 2009	Estadio Romano, Mérida, Spain	Estonia	2–0	3–0	2010 FIFA World Cup qualification
3.	4 June 2011	Gillette Stadium, Foxborough, United States	United States	1–0	4–0	Friendly
4.	4 June 2011	Gillette Stadium, Foxborough, United States	United States	3–0	4–0	Friendly
5.	26 May 2012	AFG Arena, St. Gallen, Switzerland	Serbia	2–0	2–0	Friendly
6.	30 May 2012	Stade de Suisse, Bern, Switzerland	South Korea	3–1	4–1	Friendly
7.	15 August 2012	Juan Ramón Loubriel, Bayamón, Puerto Rico	Puerto Rico	1–0	2–1	Friendly
8.	7 September 2012	Pasarón, Pontevedra, Spain	Saudi Arabia	1–0	5–0	Friendly
9.	8 June 2013	Sun Life, Miami Gardens, United States	Haiti	1–0	2–1	Friendly
10.	14 August 2013	Monumental, Guayaquil, Ecuador	Ecuador	2–0	2–0	Friendly
11.	16 November 2013	Estadio de Malabo, Malabo, Equatorial Guinea	Equatorial Guinea	1–0	2–1	Friendly (unofficial)
12.	9 October 2015	Estadio Las Gaunas, Logroño, Spain	Luxembourg	1–0	4–0	UEFA Euro 2016 qualification
13.	9 October 2015	Estadio Las Gaunas, Logroño, Spain	Luxembourg	4–0	4–0	UEFA Euro 2016 qualification
14.	13 November 2015	Estadio José Rico Pérez, Alicante, Spain	England	2–0	2–0	Friendly
15.	15 November 2019	Ramón de Carranza, Cádiz, Spain	Malta	2–0	7–0	UEFA Euro 2020 qualification

== Honours ==
Villarreal

- UEFA Intertoto Cup: 2004

Arsenal

- FA Cup: 2013–14, 2014–15
- FA Community Shield: 2014, 2015

Al Sadd

- Qatar Stars League: 2020–21, 2021–22
- Qatar Cup: 2021
- Emir of Qatar Cup: 2020, 2021
- Qatari Stars Cup: 2019–20

Real Oviedo

- Segunda División play-offs: 2025

Spain

- UEFA European Championship: 2008, 2012

Individual

- Spain's Player of the Year: 2006–07
- Arsenal Player of the Season: 2012–13
- PFA Fans' Player of the Month: December 2014, January 2015
- CIES Football Observatory Best Central Midfielder (Offensive) of the Year: 2015
- CIES Football Observatory Dream Team: 2015
- Qatar Stars League Best Player Award: 2020–21
- Qatar Stars League Player of the Month: September/October 2020
