= Papa Djibril =

Senegalese footballer (born 1983)

Personal information
- Full name: Papa Djibril Guèye
- Date of birth: 7 March 1983 (age 43)
- Place of birth: Senegal
- Height: 1.93 m (6 ft 4 in)
- Position: Goalkeeper

Senior career*
Years	Team	Apps	(Gls)
2006–2008	Al-Sailiya	42	(0)
2008–2023	Al-Khor	234	(0)
- * Club domestic league appearances and goals

Papa Djibril Guèye (Arabic: بابا جبريل) (born 7 March 1983) is a Senegalese former footballer.
