= Hassan Idriss Dicko =

Senegalese footballer (born 1985)

Hassan Idriss
Personal information
- Full name: Hassan Idriss Dicko
- Date of birth: 1 January 1985 (age 41)
- Place of birth: Senegal
- Height: 1.82 m (5 ft 11 1/2 in)
- Position: Goalkeeper

Senior career*
Years	Team	Apps	(Gls)
2006–2013	El Jaish		
2012–2013	→ Al-Wakra (loan)	9	(0)
2013–2021	Al-Wakra	74	(0)
2017–2018	→ Al-Sailiya (loan)	7	(0)
2021–2023	Al-Shamal	5	(0)
- * Club domestic league appearances and goals

Hassan Idriss Dicko (Arabic: حسن إدريس ديكو; born 1 January 1985) is a Senegalese footballer. He currently plays as a goalkeeper.
