= Ivanildo (footballer) =

Brazilian footballer (born 1988)

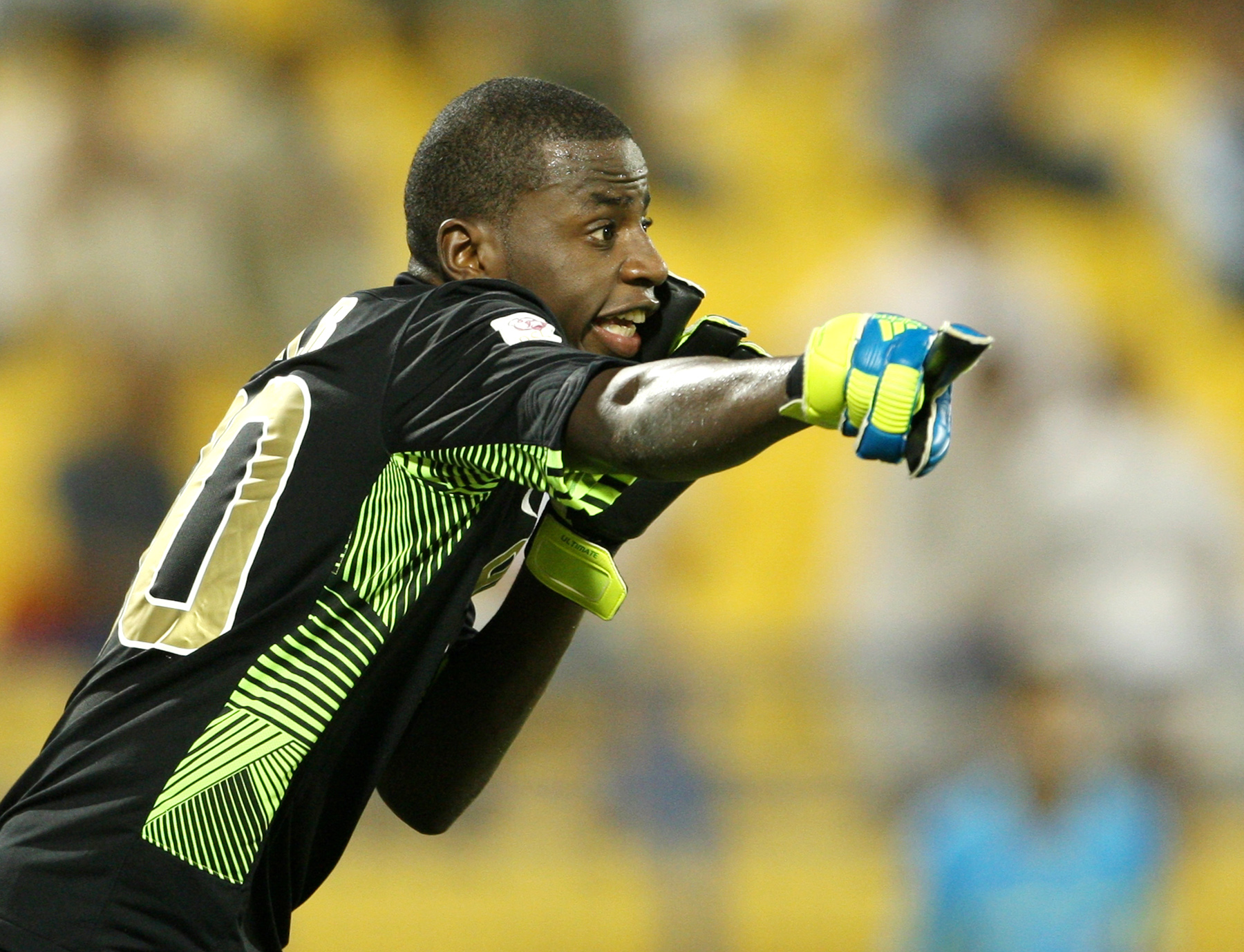
- Ivanildo (2011)

Personal information
- Full name: Ivanildo Rodrigues dos Santos
- Date of birth: December 12, 1988 (age 37)
- Place of birth: Brazil
- Height: 1.91 m (6 ft 3 in)
- Position: Goalkeeper

Senior career*
Years	Team	Apps	(Gls)
2009–2011	Al Shamal	1	(0)
2011–2016	El Jaish	38	(0)
2015–2016	→ Lekhwiya (loan)	4	(0)
2016–2017	Al Gharrafa	0	(0)
2017–2018	Al-Markhiya	4	(0)
2018–2023	Al Ahli	59	(0)
2022	→ Al Sadd (loan)	3	(0)
2023	→ Al-Rayyan (loan)	10	(0)
2023–2024	Muaither	22	(0)
- * Club domestic league appearances and goals as of April 18, 2023

Ivanildo Rodrigues dos Santos (born December 12, 1988), commonly known as Ivan or Ivanildo, is a Brazilian footballer who plays as a goalkeeper.

== Career ==
On October 2, 2011, Ivan made his professional debut as a starter for El Jaish in a league match against Lekhwiya.

In December 2012, while playing for El Jaish SC against Al Rayyan he sent a free-kick out for a corner from inside his own penalty area after slicing the ball when trying to find a teammate with the ball. The video of the incident went viral on the internet.
