= Qatar Insurance =

Qatar-based insurance company

Qatar Insurance Group (QIC)
- Founded: 1964
- Headquarters: Doha, Qatar
- Key people: Salem Khalaf Al Mannai (CEO); Sheikh Hamad bin Faisal Al Thani (Chairman)
- Number of employees: 125
- Website: qic-group.com

Qatar Insurance Group (QIC, QIC Group) is a Qatari insurance company, headquartered in Doha. QIC Group was listed 73rd on Forbes Middle East top 100 companies in 2022 and 72nd on the Fortune 500 Arabia list for 2023.

QIC was established in 1964 as the first domestic insurance company in Qatar. The company has since expanded its operations to include various insurance lines. It operates in ten countries, including Qatar, Oman, Kuwait, the United Arab Emirates, and others.

== History ==
Qatar Insurance Company (QIC) was established in 1964 with the involvement of the Qatari government and private investors. It was one of the first insurance companies in Qatar. QIC expanded its operations to the United Arab Emirates, Oman, and Kuwait in subsequent years. In 2008, the company initiated a global expansion under the name Qatar Insurance Group.

QIC started focusing on developing its presence and operations in the European and Asian markets through the establishment of Qatar Reinsurance Company Limited (Qatar Re) in 2009, and later on with the acquisition of Antares Holdings Limited together with its subsidiaries in 2014, a leading global specialist insurer and reinsurer operating in the Lloyd’s of London. In May 2019, Epicure Investment Management LLC (“EIM”) a regulated investment manager that is registered in the Qatar Financial Centre was established. Anoud technologies LLC is the Group’s tech arm and was established in 2020.

The Company’s shares were first listed on the Doha Securities Market (now known as the Qatar Stock Exchange) in 1997. QIC Group has a diverse global investment portfolio, including insurance, reinsurance, insurtech, asset management, and real estate sectors. It offers a full range of personal lines of insurance including car, motorcycle, travel, home, boat, life & medical insurance, as well as commercial insurance, including property, commercial, marine, aviation, energy, and motor fleet insurance.

== Awards ==
- Mobile App of the Year , 2024, Qatar accolade at Insurance Asia Awards
- Best travel insurance company in the Middle East, 2024, Global Banking & Finance Review Awards.
