= 2026–27 Qatar Stars League =

Qatar Stars League
- Season: 2026–27
- Dates: 20 August 2026 – May 2027
- Matches: 42
- Goals: 152 (3.62 per match)
- Top goalscorer: Akram Afif (7 goals)
- All statistics correct as of 29 October 2026.

The 2026–27 Qatar Stars League (also known as the Doha Bank Stars League for sponsorship reasons) is the 54th edition of the top-level football championship in Qatar. The season began on 20 August 2026 and is scheduled to conclude in May 2027.

Al Sadd are the defending champions, having won the previous season for the third consecutive time and for a record-extending 19th overall title.

== Clubs ==
=== Team changes ===
▲ from 2025–26 Second Division League	▼ to 2026–27 Second Division League
Lusail	Umm Salal

Locations of the 2026–27 Qatar Stars League teams

=== Stadia and locations ===
Club	City/Town	Stadium	Capacity
Al Ahli	Doha	Hamad bin Khalifa Stadium	12,000
Al-Arabi	Doha	Grand Hamad Stadium	12,000
Al Duhail	Doha	Abdullah bin Khalifa Stadium	10,000
Al-Gharafa	Doha	Thani bin Jassim Stadium	21,872
Al-Rayyan	Al Rayyan	Ahmad bin Ali Stadium	47,343
Al Sadd	Doha	Jassim bin Hamad Stadium	13,030
Al-Sailiya	Doha	Hamad bin Khalifa Stadium	12,000
Al Shahaniya	Doha	Grand Hamad Stadium	13,000
Al-Shamal	Al Shamal	Al-Shamal SC Stadium	5,000
Al-Wakrah	Al Wakrah	Saoud bin Abdulrahman Stadium	12,000
Qatar SC	Doha	Suheim bin Hamad Stadium	12,000
Lusail	Doha	Suheim bin Hamad Stadium	13,000

=== Personnel and kits ===
Club	Head coach	Captain	Kit manufacturer	Shirt sponsor
Al Ahli	(Montenegro) Nebojsa Jovovic	(Qatar) Jassem Mohammed Omar	Adidas	Regency Group Holding
Al-Arabi	(Romania) Cosmin Contra	(Kenya) Michael Olunga	Adidas	Doha Bank; Sharq Insurance; Snoonu
Al Duhail	(Algeria) Djamel Belmadi	(Qatar) Almoez Ali	Puma	Al Rayan Bank
Al-Gharafa	(Portugal) Pedro Martins	(Tunisia) Ferjani Sassi	Adidas	N/A
Al-Rayyan	(Spain) Vicente Moreno	(Qatar) Abdulaziz Hatem	Nike	Baladna; Mall of Qatar
Al Sadd	(Romania) Răzvan Lucescu	(Qatar) Hassan Al-Haydos	New Balance	Qatar Airways
Al-Sailiya	(Qatar) Majdi Siddiq	(Algeria) Mohamed Benyettou	Jako	N/A
Al Shahaniya	(Qatar) Younes Ali	(Qatar) Mustafa Jalal	Adidas	Serin
Al-Shamal	(Spain) David Prats	(Algeria) Baghdad Bounedjah	Puma	MultiBank Group
Al-Wakrah	(Chile) José Luis Sierra	(Qatar) Lucas Mendes	Adidas	Barwa Group
Qatar SC	(Qatar) Rashid Al Kubaisi	(Qatar) Sebastián Soria	Macron	Estithmar Holding
Lusail	(Portugal) Emanuel Mesquita	(Niger) Saud Jibril	Erreà	Qatari Diar

== League table ==
Pos	Team	Pld	W	D	L	GF	GA	GD	Pts	Qualification or relegation
1	Al Sadd	10	7	0	3	37	20	+17	21	Qualification for AFC Champions League Elite league stage
2	Al Rayyan	9	6	3	0	20	6	+14	21	Qualification for AFC Champions League Elite league stage
3	Al Duhail	10	6	3	1	21	10	+11	21	Qualification for the AFC Champions League Two group stage
4	Al-Arabi	10	3	5	2	20	13	+7	14	
5	Al Shamal	10	3	4	3	19	18	+1	13	
6	Al Ahli	10	3	4	3	17	18	−1	13	
7	Lusail	10	3	3	4	15	14	+1	12	
8	Al Gharafa	10	3	3	4	14	17	−3	12	
9	Al-Wakrah	9	3	2	4	14	19	−5	11	
10	Al Shahaniya	9	3	1	5	12	21	−9	10	
11	Qatar SC	10	2	3	5	13	22	−9	9	Relegation play-off Qatar Second Division League
12	Al Sailiya	9	0	1	8	9	33	−24	1	Relegation to Qatar Second Division League

Updated to match(es) played on 20 November 2026. Source: Qatar Stars League
Rules for classification: 1) Points; 2) Goal difference; 3) Goals scored; 4) Head-to-head points; 5) Head-to-head goal difference.

== Results ==
Home \ Away	AHL	DUH	GHA	RAY	SAD	SAI	SHH	SHM	ARA	WAK	LUS	QAT
Al Ahli	—	28 Nov			3 Dec	5–0		1–1		0–3	3–3	1–0
Al Duhail		—				2–0	1–1		1–1	3–1	3–1	1–2
Al Gharafa	2–2	1–2	—	0–0			2–1	1–3	3–2		0–0	2–0
Al Rayyan	3–0	1–1		—							1–0	
Al Sadd	3–1	2–3	4–1	3–4	—			4–1	2–3		3–2	
Al Sailiya		4 Dec	27 Nov	1–6	3–6	—			0–2		1–2	2–2
Al Shahaniya	1–2		4 Dec	21 Nov	0–4	3–2	—		0–6		1–0	
Al Shamal		0–4		29 Nov		5–0	4–2	—	3 Dec	1–1		2–3
Al-Arabi	2–2			0–0				2–2	—			0–0
Al-Wakrah			3–2	1–2	28 Nov	21 Nov	0–3		3–2	—		2–2
Lusail				5 Dec				0–0	27 Nov	4–0	—	3–2
Qatar SC				0–3	2–6		29 Nov			5 Dec		—

Updated to match(es) played on 20 November 2026. Source: Qatar Stars League
Legend: Blue = home team win; Yellow = draw; Red = away team win.

== Season statistics ==
=== Top goalscorers ===
Rank	Player	Team	Goals
1	(Qatar) Akram Afif	Al Sadd	7
1	(Brazil) Roberto Firmino	Al Sadd	7
3	(Spain) Pablo Sarabia	Al-Arabi	6
3	(Morocco) Amine Zouhzouh	Al-Wakrah	6
5	(Brazil) Róger Guedes	Al-Rayyan	5
