= List of companies of Qatar =

Location of Qatar

Qatar is a sovereign country located in Western Asia, occupying the small Qatar Peninsula on the northeastern coast of the Arabian Peninsula. Oil was discovered in Qatar in 1940, in Dukhan Field. The discovery transformed the state's economy. Now, the country has a high standard of living for its legal citizens. With no income tax, Qatar (along with Bahrain and the UAE) is one of the countries with the lowest tax rates in the world. The unemployment rate in June 2013 was 0.1%. Corporate law mandates that Qatari nationals must hold 51% of any venture in the Emirate. In January 2018 a new draft law was approved by the Council of Ministers that would allow 100 percent foreign investment in all economic and commercial activities and sectors to help foreign capital inflow.

== Notable firms ==
This list includes notable companies with primary headquarters located in the country. The industry and sector follow the Industry Classification Benchmark taxonomy. Organizations which have ceased operations are included and noted as defunct.

Notable companies Status: P=Private, S=State; A=Active, D=Defunct
Name	Industry	Sector	Headquarters	Founded	Notes	Status	
Al Jazeera Media Network	Consumer services	Broadcasting & entertainment	Doha	1996	Multimedia corporation	P	A
Barwa Group	Financials	Real estate holding & development	Doha	2005	Development	P	A
BSI-Steel Building System Integration W.L.L	Basic materials	Iron & steel	Doha	2006	Steel company	P	A
GSSG Holding	Conglomerates	-	Doha	1994	Engineering, aviation, education, automotive company	P	A
Gulf Drilling International	Oil & gas	Exploration & production	Doha	2004	Part of QatarEnergy	S	A
Gulf Helicopters	Consumer services	Airlines	Doha	1970	Charter helicopters	P	A
Hamad Medical Corporation	Health care	Health care providers	Doha	1979	State-owned healthcare provider	S	A
International Bank of Qatar (IBQ)	Financials	Banks	Doha	1956	Private bank	P	A
Kahramaa	Utilities	Conventional electricity	Doha	2000	State-owned electrical and water company	S	A
Nakilat	Industrials	Marine transportation	Doha	2004	State-owned gas shipping company	S	A
Nehmeh	Industrials	Diversified industrials	Doha	1955	Multidisciplinary company	P	A
Ooredoo	Telecommunications	Fixed line telecommunications	Doha	1987	State-owned telecommunications provider	S	A
Oryx GTL	Oil & gas	Exploration & production	Ras Laffan Industrial City	2003	Gas to liquids company	P	A
Qatar Airways	Consumer services	Airlines	Doha	1993	State-owned airline	S	A
Qatar Amiri Flight	Consumer services	Airlines	Doha	1977	State-owned VIP airline	S	A
Qatar Development Bank	Financials	Banks	Doha	1997	State-owned development bank	S	A
Qatar Exchange	Financials	Investment services	Doha	1995	State-owned primary exchange	S	A
Qatar Executive	Consumer services	Airlines	Doha	2009	Charter jet subsidiary of Qatar Airways	S	A
Qatar Insurance	Financials	Full line insurance	Doha	1964	State-owned insurance company	S	A
Qatar National Cement Company	Industrials	Building materials & fixtures	Umm Bab	1965	Cement manufacturing company	S	A
Qatar National Company for Medical Projects	Health care	Health care providers	Doha	2005	Healthcare company	P	A
Qatar Steel	Basic materials	Iron & steel	Mesaieed	1974	State-owned steel company	S	A
QatarEnergy	Oil & gas	Exploration & production	Doha	1974	State-owned petroleum company	S	A
QatarEnergy LNG	Oil & gas	Exploration & production	Doha	1984	State-owned natural gas company	S	A
QNB Group	Financials	Banks	Doha	1964	Commercial bank	P	A
RasGas	Oil & gas	Exploration & production	Doha	2001	Natural gas company	P	A
Salam International Investment Limited	Conglomerates	-	Doha	1952	Multidisciplinary company	P	A
Seashore Group	Conglomerates	-	Al Khor	1989	Multidisciplinary company	P	A

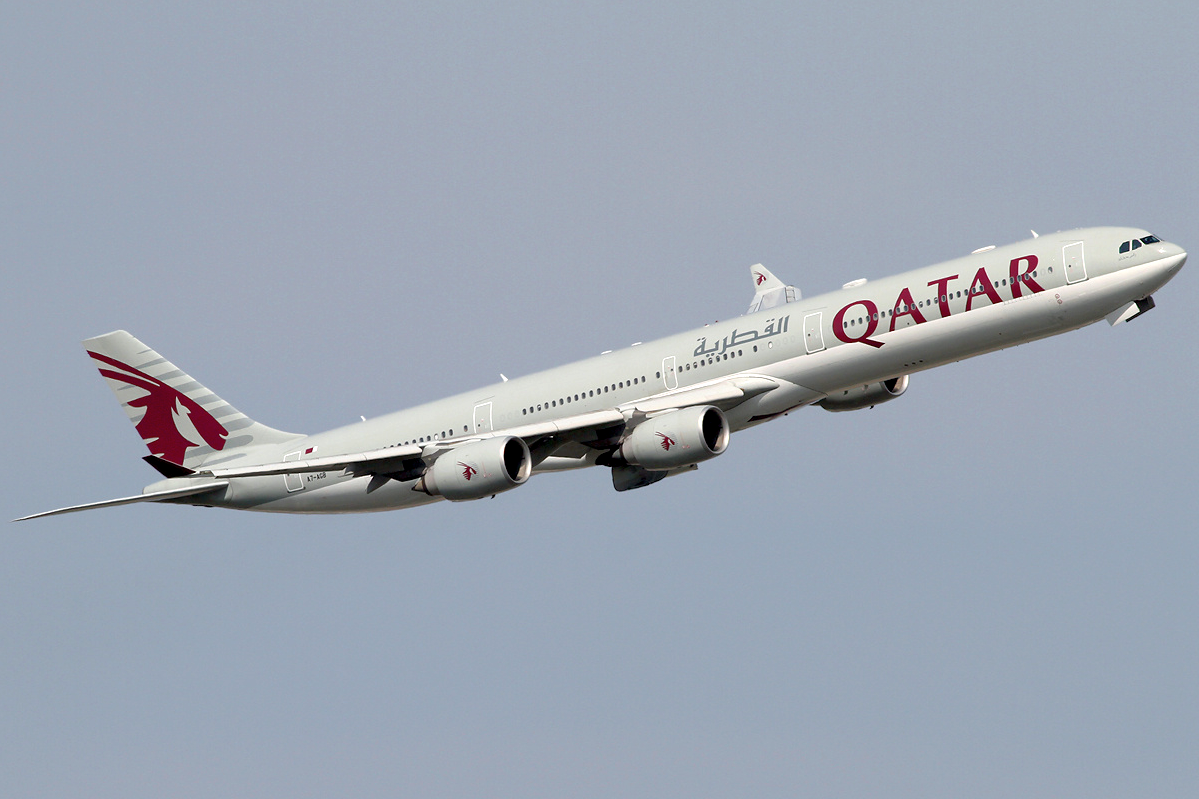
A Qatar Airways Airbus A340-600 departing London Heathrow Airport in 2014

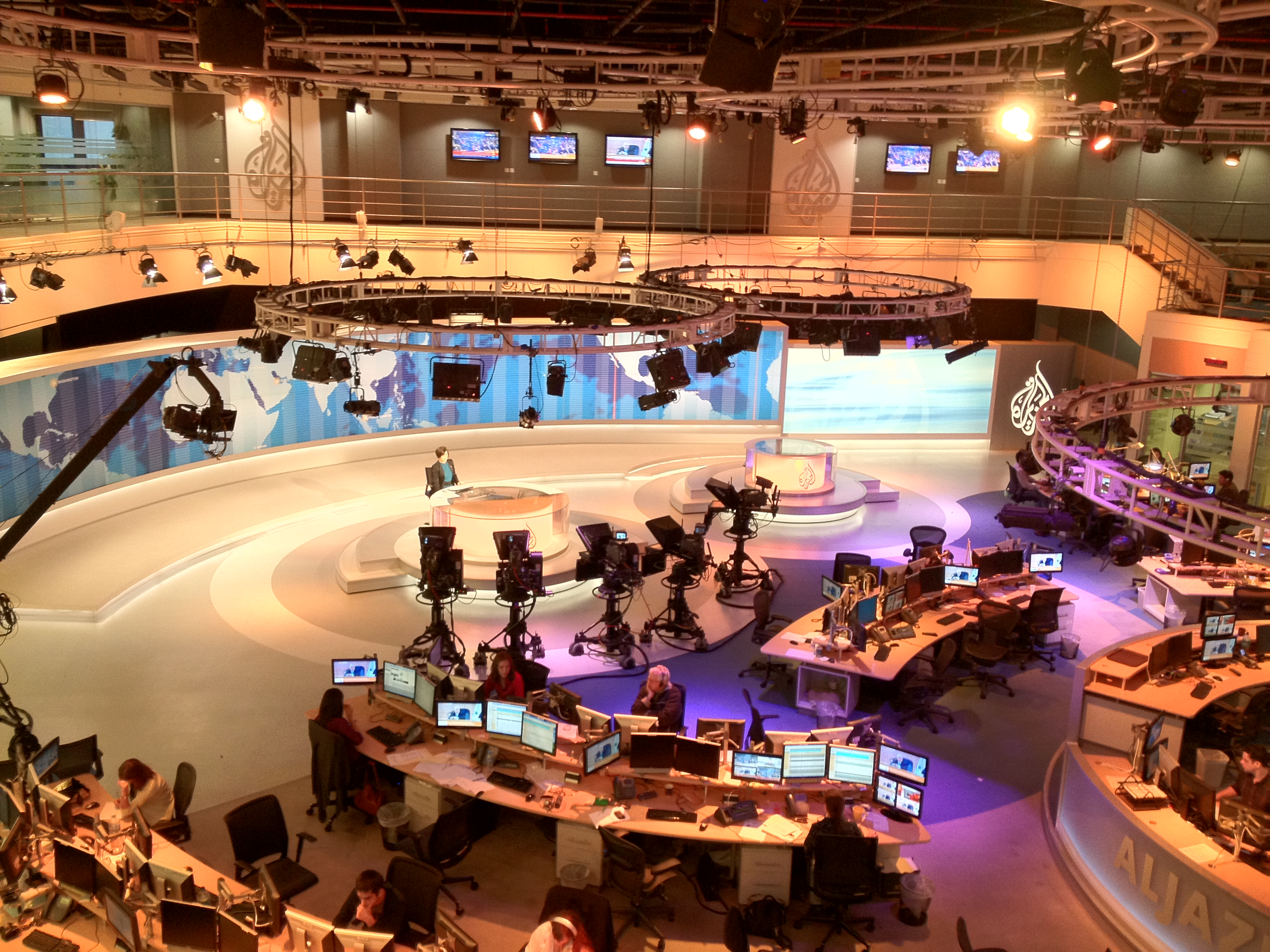
The news desk of Al Jazeera English

== See also ==
- List of airlines of Qatar
- Economy of Qatar
- Qatar Stock Exchange
