= 2025–26 Qatar Stars League =

Qatar Stars League
- Season: 2025–26
- Dates: 14 August 2025 – 27 April 2026
- Champions: Al Sadd (19th title)
- Relegated: Umm Salal
- Champions League Elite: Al Sadd; Al-Shamal; Al-Gharafa (As Amir of Qatar Cup winners)
- Champions League Two: Al-Rayyan
- GFF Gulf Club Champions League: Al Duhail; Qatar SC
- Matches: 132
- Goals: 438 (3.32 per match)
- Top goalscorer: Róger Guedes (20 goals)
- Biggest home win: Al-Sailiya 4–0 Al-Arabi (27 September 2025); Al Sadd 5–1 Al Rayyan (30 October 2025); Al-Shamal 4–0 Al Shahaniya (23 November 2025); Al-Wakrah 4–0 Al Shahaniya (29 January 2026); Al Sadd 4–0 Al Shahaniya (5 February 2026)
- Biggest away win: Al-Arabi 1–8 Al Duhail (20 September 2025)
- Highest scoring: Umm Salal 3–8 Al Sadd (8 November 2025)
- Longest winning run: 9 matches Al Sadd
- Longest unbeaten run: 9 matches Al Sadd
- Longest winless run: 6 matches Al Ahli; Al Shahaniya; Al-Wakrah
- Longest losing run: 6 matches Al Shahaniya

The 2025–26 Qatar Stars League or the QSL, also called Doha Bank Stars League for sponsorship reasons, was the 52nd edition of top-level football championship in Qatar. The season began on 14 August 2025 and concluded on 17 April 2026. Al Sadd were defending champions, having won the previous season. Due to the risk of missile strikes from Iran stemming from the 2026 Iran war, the league was suspended from 1–11 March.

== Clubs ==
=== Team changes ===
▲ from 2024–25 Second Division League	▼ to 2025–26 Second Division League
Al-Sailiya	Al-Khor

Locations of the 2025–26 Qatar Stars League teams
Doha Qatar Stars League football clubs

=== Stadia and locations ===
Club	City/Town	Stadium	Capacity
Al Ahli	Doha	Hamad bin Khalifa Stadium	12,000
Al-Arabi	Doha	Grand Hamad Stadium	12,000
Al Duhail	Doha	Abdullah bin Khalifa Stadium	10,000
Al-Gharafa	Doha	Thani bin Jassim Stadium	21,872
Al-Rayyan	Al Rayyan	Ahmad bin Ali Stadium	47,343
Al Sadd	Doha	Jassim bin Hamad Stadium	13,030
Al-Sailiya	Doha	Hamad bin Khalifa Stadium	12,000
Al Shahaniya	Doha	Grand Hamad Stadium	13,000
Al-Shamal	Al Shamal	Al-Shamal SC Stadium	5,000
Al-Wakrah	Al Wakrah	Saoud bin Abdulrahman Stadium	12,000
Qatar SC	Doha	Suheim bin Hamad Stadium	12,000
Umm Salal	Doha	Thani bin Jassim Stadium	21,872

=== Personnel and kits ===
Club	Head coach	Captain	Kit manufacturer	Shirt sponsor
Al Ahli	(Qatar) Younes Ali	(Qatar) Jassem Mohammed Omar	Adidas	Regency Group Holding
Al-Arabi	(Romania) Cosmin Contra	(Kenya) Michael Olunga	Adidas	Doha Bank; Sharq Insurance; Snoonu
Al Duhail	(Algeria) Djamel Belmadi	(Qatar) Almoez Ali	Puma	Al Rayan Bank
Al-Gharafa	(Portugal) Pedro Martins	(Tunisia) Ferjani Sassi	Adidas	N/A
Al-Rayyan	Vacant	(Qatar) Abdulaziz Hatem	Nike	Baladna; Mall of Qatar
Al Sadd	(Italy) Roberto Mancini	(Qatar) Hassan Al-Haydos	New Balance	Qatar Airways
Al-Sailiya	(Qatar) Mirghani Al Zain	(Algeria) Mohamed Benyettou	Jako	N/A
Al Shahaniya	(Iran) Pejman Montazeri (caretaker)	(Qatar) Mustafa Jalal	Adidas	Serin
Al-Shamal	(Spain) David Prats	(Algeria) Baghdad Bounedjah	Puma	MultiBank Group
Al-Wakrah	(Spain) Vicente Moreno	(Qatar) Lucas Mendes	Adidas	Barwa Group
Qatar SC	(Spain) Tintín Márquez	(Qatar) Sebastián Soria	Macron	Estithmar Holding
Umm Salal	(Spain) Rubén Albés	(Morocco) Oussama Tannane	Jako	Al Badiya

== League table ==
Pos	Team	Pld	W	D	L	GF	GA	GD	Pts	Qualification or relegation
1	Al Sadd (C)	22	14	3	5	56	30	+26	45	Qualification for the AFC Champions League Elite League stage
2	Al-Shamal	22	12	4	6	39	28	+11	40	Qualification for the AFC Champions League Elite League stage
3	Al-Rayyan	22	11	5	6	46	32	+14	38	Qualification for the AFC Champions League Two group stage
4	Al-Gharafa	22	11	3	8	36	36	0	36	Qualification for the AFC Champions League Elite League stage (Note: Qualified as the 2026 Amir of Qatar Cup winners.)
5	Al Duhail	22	9	6	7	40	27	+13	33	Qualification for the GFF Gulf Club Champions League group stage
6	Qatar SC	22	9	5	8	34	32	+2	32	Qualification for the GFF Gulf Club Champions League group stage
7	Al-Arabi	22	9	5	8	37	41	−4	32	
8	Al-Wakrah	22	7	6	9	32	36	−4	27	
9	Al Ahli	22	8	2	12	34	43	−9	26	
10	Al-Sailiya	22	6	4	12	25	38	−13	22	
11	Al Shahaniya (O)	22	6	3	13	22	39	−17	21	Qualification for Relegation play-off
12	Umm Salal (R)	22	6	2	14	37	56	−19	20	Relegation to Qatar Stars League 2

Source: QSL, Soccerway
Rules for classification: 1) Points; 2) Goal difference; 3) Number of goals scored;
(C) Champions; (O) Play-off winners; (R) Relegated

== Results ==
Home \ Away	AHL	ARA	DUH	GHA	RAY	SAD	SAI	SHH	SHA	WAK	QAT	UMM
Al Ahli		1–1	2–1	1–3	0–3	0–2	2–2	1–2	4–2	5–3	1–3	0–3
Al-Arabi	1–0		1–8	1–2	2–2	2–1	1–2	2–0	1–2	2–2	1–1	3–2
Al Duhail	2–3	1–1		3–2	1–1	1–3	2–2	1–1	2–0	0–1	1–0	4–2
Al-Gharafa	1–4	2–1	3–1		3–2	1–3	2–0	1–1	0–1	1–0	2–1	4–2
Al-Rayyan	2–1	4–0	1–0	2–3		1–1	3–1	1–2	0–1	2–1	1–1	3–0
Al Sadd	2–0	1–3	0–0	2–0	5–1		3–1	4–0	3–2	2–2	2–3	2–5
Al-Sailiya	1–2	4–0	0–4	1–0	1–3	1–3		3–2	1–2	0–0	2–1	0–1
Al Shahaniya	1–2	0–2	0–0	3–0	1–5	1–0	0–1		2–0	0–1	3–4	3–0
Al-Shamal	2–0	3–2	1–3	0–0	4–2	0–3	0–0	4–0		2–2	3–0 (Note: Original match ended 0–2, but due to a regulatory violation by Qatar (fielding an ineligible foreign player), Al-Shamal's protest was accepted and the result was overturned to a 3–0 administrative win for Al-Shamal.)	3–2
Al-Wakrah	3–2	0–1	0–2	3–3	0–2	1–3	3–1	4–0	0–1		1–0	3–2
Qatar SC	2–0	1–5	1–2	2–0	3–3	2–3	2–0	1–0	1–1	1–4		2–1
Umm Salal	1–3	2–4	2–1	2–3	1–2	3–8	2–1	2–0	0–5	2–2	0–0	

Source: Soccerway
Legend: Blue = home team win; Yellow = draw; Red = away team win.

== Relegation play-off ==
9 May 2026
19:00

Al-Shahaniya	3–0	Al Kharaitiyat
Traoré 31'; El-Wadia 53'; van Beek 63'	Report

Jassim Bin Hamad Stadium, Al Rayyan
Referee: Mohammed Ahmad Al-Mazyed

== Season statistics ==
=== Top goalscorers ===
Rank	Player	Team	Goals
1	(Brazil) Róger Guedes	Al-Rayyan	20
2	(Brazil) João Pedro	Qatar SC	16
3	(Qatar) Akram Afif	Al Sadd	15
4	(Brazil) Roberto Firmino	Al Sadd	13
5	(Poland) Krzysztof Piątek	Al Duhail	9
5	(Algeria) Redouane Berkane	Al-Wakrah	9
5	(Spain) Pablo Sarabia	Al-Arabi	9
5	(Spain) Rafa Mújica	Al Sadd	9
5	(Morocco) Oussama Tannane	Umm Salal	9
5	(Algeria) Baghdad Bounedjah	Al-Shamal	9
5	(Morocco) Amin Zahzouh	Al-Wakrah	9
5	(Netherlands) Michel Vlap	Al Ahli	9
