= 2024–25 Qatar Stars League =

Football league season

Qatar Stars League
- Season: 2024–25
- Dates: 9 August 2024 – 18 April 2025
- Champions: Al Sadd
- Relegated: Al-Khor
- Champions League Elite: Al Sadd; Al-Gharafa; Al-Duhail
- Champions League Two: Al Ahli
- AGCFF Gulf Club Champions League: Al-Rayyan
- Matches: 96
- Goals: 335 (3.49 per match)
- Top goalscorer: Róger Guedes (21 goals)
- Biggest home win: Al Sadd 5–0 Al-Arabi (22 August 2024)
- Biggest away win: Qatar SC 1–6 Al-Duhail (10 August 2024); Al-Arabi 0–5 Al-Duhail (23 November 2024)
- Highest scoring: Al Ahli 6–3 Al-Wakrah (11 January 2025)
- Longest winning run: 5 matches Al-Duhail; Al Sadd; Al-Gharafa
- Longest unbeaten run: 10 matches Al-Gharafa
- Longest winless run: 10 matches Al-Khor
- Longest losing run: 5 matches Umm Salal; Al-Khor
- All statistics correct as of 23 February 2025.

The 2024–25 Qatar Stars League or the QSL, also called Ooredoo Stars League for sponsorship reasons, was the 52nd edition of top-level football championship in Qatar.

Al Sadd were the defending champions, having won the previous season.

== Clubs ==
Locations of the 2024–25 Qatar Stars League teams
Doha Qatar Stars League football clubs

=== Stadia and locations ===
Club	City/Town	Stadium	Capacity
Al Ahli	Doha	Hamad bin Khalifa Stadium	12,000
Al-Arabi	Doha	Grand Hamad Stadium	12,000
Al-Duhail	Doha	Abdullah bin Khalifa Stadium	10,000
Al-Gharafa	Doha	Thani bin Jassim Stadium	21,872
Al-Khor	Al-Khor	Al-Khor SC Stadium	11,015
Al-Rayyan	Al Rayyan	Ahmad bin Ali Stadium	47,343
Al Sadd	Doha	Jassim bin Hamad Stadium	13,030
Al Shahaniya	Doha	Grand Hamad Stadium	13,000
Al-Shamal	Al Shamal	Al-Shamal SC Stadium	5,000
Al-Wakrah	Al Wakrah	Saoud bin Abdulrahman Stadium	12,000
Qatar SC	Doha	Suheim bin Hamad Stadium	12,000
Umm Salal	Doha	Thani bin Jassim Stadium	21,872

=== Personnel and kits ===
Club	Coach	Captain	Kit manufacturer	Shirt sponsor
Al Ahli	(Croatia) Igor Bišćan	(Qatar) Jassem Mohammed Omar	Adidas	Regency Group Holding
Al-Arabi	(Spain) Pablo Amo	(Qatar) Abdullah Marafee	Adidas	Doha Bank; Sharq Insurance; Snoonu
Al-Duhail	(France) Christophe Galtier	(Qatar) Almoez Ali	Puma	Al Rayan Bank
Al-Gharafa	(Portugal) Pedro Martins	(Tunisia) Ferjani Sassi	Kelme	N/A
Al-Khor	(Iraq) Salam Shaker (caretaker)	(Qatar) Nayef Mubarak	N/A	N/A
Al-Rayyan	(Portugal) Artur Jorge	(Qatar) Abdulaziz Hatem	Nike	Baladna; Mall of Qatar
Al Sadd	(Spain) Félix Sánchez	(Qatar) Hassan Al-Haydos	New Balance	Qatar Airways
Al-Shamal	(Spain) David Prats	(Algeria) Baghdad Bounedjah	Zat Outfit	N/A
Al Shahaniya	(Spain) José Murcia	(Qatar) Mustafa Jalal	N/A	N/A
Al-Wakrah	(Sweden) Poya Asbaghi	(Qatar) Lucas Mendes	Puma	N/A
Qatar SC	(Morocco) Youssef Safri	(Qatar) Sebastián Soria	Erreà	N/A
Umm Salal	(France) Patrice Beaumelle	(Algeria) Victor Lekhal	Puma	N/A

== League table ==
Pos	Team	Pld	W	D	L	GF	GA	GD	Pts	Qualification or relegation
1	Al Sadd (C)	22	17	1	4	62	23	+39	52	Qualification for the AFC Champions League Elite League stage (Note: Al-Gharafa qualified for the AFC Champions League Elite as the 2025 Emir of Qatar Cup winners. As a result, the second AFC Champions League Two berth was passed to the team in 4th place.)
2	Al-Duhail	22	16	2	4	51	20	+31	50	Qualification for the AFC Champions League Elite play-off round
3	Al-Gharafa	22	12	5	5	41	30	+11	41	Qualification for the AFC Champions League Elite League stage
4	Al Ahli	22	10	5	7	38	39	−1	35	Qualification for the AFC Champions League Two group stage
5	Al-Rayyan	22	10	3	9	45	35	+10	33	Qualification for the AGCFF Gulf Club Champions League group stage
6	Al-Shamal	22	10	2	10	41	34	+7	32	
7	Al Shahaniya	22	8	3	11	31	43	−12	27	
8	Al-Wakrah	22	7	4	11	27	40	−13	25	
9	Al-Arabi	22	6	5	11	32	49	−17	23	
10	Qatar SC	22	6	5	11	26	44	−18	23	
11	Umm Salal (O)	22	6	3	13	27	43	−16	21	Qualification for Relegation play-off
12	Al-Khor (R)	22	3	4	15	21	42	−21	13	Relegation to Qatari Second Division

Source: QSL, Soccerway
Rules for classification: 1) Points; 2) Goal difference; 3) Number of goals scored;
(C) Champions; (O) Play-off winners; (R) Relegated

== Results ==
Home \ Away	AHL	ARA	DUH	GHA	KHO	RAY	SAD	SHH	SHA	WAK	QAT	UMM
Al Ahli	—	3–3	0–1	1–0	2–1	1–0	2–2	2–1	1–1	6–3	0–3	0–1
Al-Arabi	4–2	—	0–5	1–3	1–1	2–1	1–3	3–1	1–0	1–1	4–1	0–3
Al-Duhail	4–2	1–0	—	1–1	1–2	4–0	5–1	2–1	0–4	2–0	4–1	1–0
Al-Gharafa	2–0	3–1	0–2	—	3–1	2–1	0–4	1–2	1–1	3–1	4–2	3–1
Al-Khor	0–1	3–4	0–1	0–0	—	1–2	2–5	0–0	1–2	1–3	1–2	3–0
Al-Rayyan	2–2	2–1	0–0	2–2	5–1	—	1–2	4–2	1–2	0–2	2–0	3–1
Al Sadd	5–0	5–0	2–0	4–2	3–0	2–1	—	4–2	1–0	3–0	0–1	1–3
Al Shahaniya	2–3	0–0	2–1	2–4	2–1	2–1	0–5	—	2–0	0–1	1–1	3–2
Al-Shamal	2–4	5–2	2–6	1–2	2–0	3–5	2–1	3–0	—	1–0	0–1	4–0
Al-Wakrah	2–2	4–3	0–2	1–1	3–1	0–4	0–3	0–1	0–3	—	1–1	3–0
Qatar SC	0–1	0–0	1–6	1–3	0–1	1–2	1–5	1–3	2–1	2–1	—	2–2
Umm Salal	0–3	2–0	1–2	0–1	0–0	2–6	0–1	4–2	3–2	0–1	2–2	—

Source: Soccerway
Legend: Blue = home team win; Yellow = draw; Red = away team win.

== Relegation play-off ==
28 April 2025
19:00 UTC+3

Umm Salal	2–1 (a.e.t.)	Al-Markhiya
Mance 22'; Abdulraouf 94'	Report	Louadni 57' (o.g.)

Al Bayt Stadium, Al Khor, Qatar
Referee: Mohammed Al-Shammari

== Season statistics ==
=== Top goalscorers ===
As of 18 April 2025 (Flashscore)

Rank	Player	Team	Goals
1	(Brazil) Róger Guedes	Al-Rayyan	21
2	(Algeria) Baghdad Bounedjah	Al-Shamal	18
3	(Qatar) Akram Afif	Al Sadd	17
3	(Spain) Rafa Mújica	Al Sadd	17
5	(Cape Verde) Ricardo Gomes	Al-Wakrah	13
5	(Netherlands) Pelle van Amersfoort	Al Shahaniya	13
7	(Germany) Julian Draxler	Al Ahli	12
8	(Kenya) Michael Olunga	Al-Duhail	11
9	(Croatia) Antonio Mance	Umm Salal	10
10	(Spain) Joselu	Al-Gharafa	9
