= Moutaz Al-Khayyat =

Syrian businessman

- Born: 16 April 1983 (age 43)
- Education: University of the West of Scotland
- Occupation: Entrepreneur
- Mother: Samya Hamsho
- Family: Mohammad Hamsho (maternal uncle)
- Website: moatazalkhayyat.com

Moutaz Al-Khayyat (born 16 April 1983) is a Syrian-Qatari billionaire entrepreneur based in Doha, Qatar. He is the Board Chairman of Power International Holding, a Qatari-based conglomerate that operates across energy, construction, industries, telecommunication, agriculture and food services, real estate, and hospitality. He is a founding partner and chairman of Baladna Food Industries and chairman of Estithmar Holding. According to Bloomberg, Moutaz and his brother Ramez Al-Khayyat have a net worth surpassing $7 billion.

== Early life and education ==
Al-Khayyat obtained his degree in Business from the University of the West of Scotland.

== Career ==
In 2011, Al-Khayyat and his brother, Ramez Al-Khayyat, co-founded Power International Holding (PIH) and UCC Holding. It has undertaken several large development projects, including the Banana Island resort, the Mall of Qatar, the Waldorf Astoria Maldives Ithaafushi, and Lekhwiya Sports Complex, which was developed as part of the 2022 Football World Cup.

In March 2014, Al-Khayyat co-founded Baladna Food Industries. In November 2019, Al-Khayyat oversaw the launch of the initial public offering (IPO) of Baladna Food Industries on the Qatar Stock Exchange, which received substantial interest. Al-Khayyat rose to prominence between 2017 and 2021 as the 'man who airlifted 4,000 dairy cows' into the country.

In April 2022, Al-Khayyat was appointed chairman of Estithmar Holding QPSC, a listed company on the Qatar Stock Exchange.

Al-Khayyat is the chairman of Aura Group, which operates in the hospitality sector and family entertainment outlets in Qatar. He is also the chairman of Assets Group, a real estate development company operating across residential, hospitality, and commercial sectors. He currently presides as Chairman over all affiliated companies within Power International Holding (PIH), including UCC Holding, Baladna, Assets Real Estate Development, Aura Group, and TMT Group.
