= Ramez Al-Khayyat =

Qatari businessman

- Born: 20 July 1984 (age 41)
- Education: University of the West of Scotland
- Occupation: Entrepreneur
- Website: ramezalkhayyat.com

Ramez Al-Khayyat is a Syrian-Qatari billionaire entrepreneur based in Doha, Qatar. He is the President and GCEO of Power International Holding, a Qatari-based conglomerate that operates across energy, construction, telecommunications, agriculture and food industries, real estate, and entertainment.

== Early life and education ==
Al-Khayyat obtained his degree in business from the University of the West of Scotland and earned a Certificate in Steering Complex Projects from the University of Cambridge.

== Career ==
Al-Khayyat started his career as a board member of Al-Khayyat Contracting and Trading, a family business established by his father Mohamad Reslan Al-Khayyat in 1983.

In 2011, Al-Khayyat and his brother Moutaz Al-Khayyat co-founded Power International Holding (PIH). He also co-founded UCC Holding with his brother Moutaz Al-Khayyat, a large construction company in Qatar. It has undertaken several large development projects including the Banana Island resort, the Mall of Qatar, the Waldorf Astoria Maldives Ithaafushi, and Lekhwiya Sports Complex, which was developed as part of the 2022 Football World Cup. Al-Khayyat serves as its president and Group CEO.

Al-Khayyat is the managing director of Baladna Food Industries, Qatar's largest dairy and beverage producer which provides 95% of the country's dairy products. Baladna rose to prominence when the company airlifted cows from other countries into Qatar. In 2021, the company was exporting to 11 countries and expanding its range of cheeses, juices and milk products.

In 2016, Al-Khayyat received the Retail Leadership Award for the Mall of Qatar development at the Asia Retail Congress Awards.

In April 2022, Al-Khayyat was appointed Vice Chairman of Estithmar Holding QPSC, a listed company on the Qatar Stock Exchange. He led the reverse acquisition of Elegancia Group by Investment Holding Group (IHG), resulting in the combined entity's listing on the Qatar Stock Exchange.

He is the President of Aura Group, a company operating in the food and beverage sector in Qatar, and Assets, a Qatar-based real estate company.

In September 2022, Power International Holding was listed by Forbes in the Middle East's Top 100 Arab Family Businesses, ranking 13th.

Al-Khayyat oversees various Power International Holding (PIH) subsidiaries. As of 2025, he is the President of UCC Holding, Estithmar Holding, Assets Group, TMT Group, and Aura Group. He is also the Managing Director of Baladna, a dairy company.
