= GDI =

GDI may refer to:

== Science and technology ==
- Gasoline direct injection, a type of fuel injection
- Graphics Device Interface, a component of Microsoft Windows
- Guanosine nucleotide dissociation inhibitor, a protein

== Organisations ==
- Gabriel Dumont Institute, in Saskatchewan, Canada
- Gardner Denver, an American manufacturing company
- Gay Doctors Ireland, a professional organisation
- GDI Integrated Facility Services, a Canadian janitorial service
- Geena Davis Institute on Gender in Media, an American nonprofit
- Girl Develop It, an American educational charity
- Global Disinformation Index, a UK think tank
- Gottlieb Duttweiler Institute, a Swiss think tank
- Gulf Drilling International, a Qatari oil and gas company
- General Directorate of Intelligence, the intelligence agency and secret police of the Islamic Emirate of Afghanistan (Taliban)

== Other uses ==
- Baka language (ISO 639-3 code)
- Gender Development Index, an index of gender equality
- Gordil Airport (IATA code), in the Central African Republic
- Gross domestic income, the total income within a state
- Los Guerreros del Infierno, a Mexican professional wrestling stable
