= UCC Holding =

Qatari-based company

- Type: Private, subsidiary
- Industry: Energy, concessions, and construction
- Founded: 2011
- Founders: Moutaz Al-Khayyat; Ramez Al-Khayyat
- Headquarters: Lusail, Qatar
- Key people: Moutaz Al-Khayyat (Chairman); Ramez Al-Khayyat (President & Group CEO)
- Parent: Power International Holding
- Website: uccholding.com

UCC Holding is a Qatari-based international company operating across energy, concessions and construction. It is a subsidiary of Power International Holding (PIH). The company was founded in 2011 by Moutaz Al-Khayyat and Ramez Al-Khayyat. It has since expanded its operations across the Middle East and other international markets. It has a presence in more than 25 countries, including Qatar, Saudi Arabia, Iraq, Libya, Syria, Algeria, Europe, South America, Rwanda, and the Maldives.

Its growth during the 2010s coincided with Qatar's large-scale infrastructure development programme, which was linked to the 2022 FIFA World Cup and long-term planning initiatives. During this period, the company participated in a range of construction and infrastructure projects and expanded its operations outside Qatar.

UCC Holding employs a workforce of more than 30,000 professionals. The company has completed more than 1,200 infrastructure and general contracting projects, covering over 60 million square meters of built space. Notable projects in Qatar include the construction of the Mall of Qatar with a total built-up area of 429,190 square meters, and Banana Island Resort Doha with a total built-up area of 67,727 square meters. In 2014, UCC Holding renovated the Sheraton Grand Doha Resort & Convention Hotel.

In 2024, UCC Holding was involved in redevelopment projects at Tripoli International Airport in Libya and Bugesera International Airport in Rwanda. Additionally, UCC Holding has developed projects including Rixos Baghdad Hotel & Residences in Iraq, as well as resort developments in the Maldives and Guyana.

In 2025, Syria signed agreements with a consortium led by UCC Holding for the redevelopment and expansion of Damascus International Airport. The project, valued at approximately $4 billion, is expected to increase the airport's capacity to around 31 million passengers annually upon completion. In May 2025, UCC Holding led a consortium that signed a $7 billion memorandum of understanding with the Syrian government to develop power generation projects, including four combined-cycle gas turbine power plants and a 1,000 MW solar power plant. The project is intended to provide over 50% of Syria's electricity needs. It is the first integrated public-private partnership model in the Syrian energy sector.

In August 2025, UCC Holding led a consortium that signed a US$250 million financing agreement with the Syrian government to support the purchase of up to 10 Airbus A320 aircraft for Syrian Airlines. Syria and Qatar signed a US$4 billion agreement to construct a third passenger terminal at Damascus International Airport, which will be funded by UCC Holding. In December 2025, UCC Holding discussed further plans with Syria's Ministry of Transport to rehabilitate the Damascus International Airport highway and improve the airport's main gateway.

== See also ==
- Power International Holding
- Estithmar Holding
- Baladna (company)
- Moutaz Al-Khayyat
- Ramez Al-Khayyat
