= Dukhan Bank =

Bank of Qatar

- Type: Public
- Traded as: QSE: DUBK
- Industry: Banking
- Founded: 2008
- Headquarters: Doha, Qatar
- Key people: Sheikh Mohammed bin Hamad bin Jassim Al Thani (Chairman); Ahmed I. Hashem (CEO); Osama Ali Ibrahim Abu Baker (CFO); Bashar Jallad (Treasurer, CIO)
- Net income: $368.8 million (2024)
- Total assets: $32.4 billion (2024)
- Website: www.dukhanbank.com

Dukhan Bank, or Dukhan Bank QPSC, (formerly Barwa Bank) is a Sharia-compliant bank located in Doha, Qatar. It also has corporate headquarters located in Lusail. It is the third largest Islamic bank in Qatar and operates in four segments: Wholesale Banking, Retail and Private Banking, Treasury and Investments Division, and Subsidiaries. As of 2025, the company serves over 150,000 customers through its eight branches.

The bank was founded in 2008 but rebranded to Dukhan Bank in 2020 following the merger of Barwa Bank and the International Bank of Qatar (IBQ) in 2019. It was listed on the Qatar Stock Exchange (QSE) in 2023 with the ticker symbol "DUBK". The General Retirement and Social Insurance Authority (GRSIA) is Dukhan Bank’s largest shareholder, with a nearly 25% stake, as of early-2025. Sheikh Mohammed bin Hamad bin Jassim Al Thani is the Chairman, and Ahmed I. Hashem is the acting group Chief Executive Officer (CEO).

== History ==
Barwa Bank incorporated in 2008 and began operations in 2009 as a full-service Shariah-compliant bank. It became Dukhan Bank in October 2020, after its 2019 merger with the IBQ.

In 2022, Dukhan Bank brought Google Pay and Samsung Pay to Qatar. That year, it also launched its D-Tap product, a payment solution for merchants. In June 2022, Dukhan Bank joined Mastercard's Digital First Card programme, becoming the first bank in Qatar to do so.

Dukhan Bank was listed on the QSE in 2023. In January 2023, the bank's board of directors appointed Khalid Al Subeai as an advisor to the Chairman, Sheikh Mohammed bin Hamad bin Jassim Al Thani, and named Ahmed Hashem as acting CEO. That same year, the bank launched an artificial intelligence (AI)-powered virtual assistant, named Rashid, that could help customers in English and Arabic through the bank's website, mobile app, online banking platforms, and WhatsApp.

In 2024, Dukhan Bank issued a $800 million five-year senior unsecured Sukuk, the "largest issue achievement by a Qatari Islamic bank since 2020". In November 2024, Qatar Financial Centre Authority (QFCA) entered into a Memorandum of Understanding (MoU) with Dukhan Bank.

In June 2025, Dukhan Bank partnered with Visa to launch a personalized cash bonus programme, the "first of its kind" in the Central and Eastern Europe, Middle East, and Africa (CEMEA) region.

In November 2025, Dukhan Bank signed a strategic MoU with Global Infrastructure Partners (GIP), a part of BlackRock, to provide Shariah-compliant private market products.

In December 2025, Qatar Museums announced a partnership with Dukhan Bank to support the development of two cultural institutions: Dadu, Children's Museum of Qatar, and the Dukhan Bank Qatar Numismatic Center.

In January 2026, the bank partnered with Intellect Design Arena and adopted the eMACH.ai Lending platform to help streamline its debt collection and management. Also that month, Dukhan Bank signed an exclusive partnership agreement with Rafeeq, "Qatar’s first all-in-one national champion e-commerce and lifestyle platform".

In February 2026, Dukhan Bank launched Qatar's first Qatar Digital Identity (QDI)-integrated digital self-serve kiosk at its headquarters in Lusail. Also in February, Dukhan Bank announced a partnership with Dibsy "to support the advancement of Open Banking in the State of Qatar". That same month, at the Web Summit Qatar 2026, Dukan Bank signed MoUs with PayLater and DriveWealth, as well as Sadad and Skip Cash.

=== Frozen Iranian funds ===
Dukhan Bank was one of two Qatar banks—Al-Ahli being the other—reported to be holding $6 billion in frozen Iranian funds. The total amount of frozen Iranian assets is estimated to be $100 billion and are spread across several countries.

In September 2023, the $6 billion was part of an agreement in which the Biden administration brokered a hostage swap where five Americans were released in exchange for the U.S. authorizing a transfer of Iranian oil revenue from South Korean banks into Qatar accounts. However, when Hamas committed the October 7 attacks in Israel, the funds were refrozen.

By 2026, the funds were still frozen. In April 2026, Iranian sources said the U.S. had agreed to unfreeze the funds, but the U.S. denied these claims. In June 2026, the U.S. and Qatar were working on a plan to make funds available to Iran for humanitarian spending as part of a deal to end the Iran War.

== Subsidiaries ==
- The First Investor (TFI) was acquired by Barwa Bank by 2010. It is now the investment arm of Dukhan Bank.
- First Finance Co. (FFC) was acquired by Dukhan Bank in 2010.

== Recognition ==
In 2023, Euromoney named Dukhan Bank "the most transformed Islamic bank in Qatar". That same year, the bank was ranked 28th on Forbes Middle East's 50 Most Valuable Banks 2023 list.

Dukhan Bank was also named "World's Best Islamic Private Bank" at the Global Finance Awards in 2024, 2025, and 2026.

Dukhan Bank was ranked 23rd on Forbes Middle East's 30 Most Valuable Banks 2025 list.

In July 2026, the bank won the "Best Business Card Offering in MENA 2026" award by MEED during the MENA Banks Excellence Awards.
