= Silvio Diliberto =

Dutch footballer

Personal information
- Full name: Silvio Diliberto
- Date of birth: 16 December 1963 (age 62)
- Place of birth: Rotterdam, Netherlands
- Position: Defender

Senior career*
Years	Team	Apps	(Gls)
1981–1987	Sparta	77	(5)
1987–1992	Roda JC	108	(4)
1992–1993	Vinkenslag		
1993–1994	Haarlem	14	(0)
1994–1996	Eindhoven	36	(3)
Total		235	(12)

Managerial career
- 2011–2012: Muaither
- 2013–2015: Al-Shamal
- 2016–2017: Al-Markhiya
- * Club domestic league appearances and goals

Silvio Diliberto (born 16 December 1963) is a Dutch retired football player who was also a kicker in American football.

== Club career ==
=== Association football ===
During his career in football he played for Sparta, for whom he made his professional debut as a winger in May 1982 against NAC, Roda JC, Haarlem and FC Eindhoven as a converted central defender. He finished his career in 1996, after he, along with fellow veterans Frans Danen and Huub Driessen, had been dropped from the squad by coach Rob Jacobs due to poor performances. At that time, FC Eindhoven had earned only two points from the first eleven matches.

=== American football ===
He retired from association football in 1996, but made a comeback in NFL Europe in 1997 - he was kicker for the Amsterdam Admirals from 1997 to 2004.

== Managerial career ==
During his time in American football, Diliberto went into soccer coaching and managed amateur side Hermes DVS, CVV Zwervers, Germania Teveren and Groene Ster. In 2011 he moved to Qatar to manage Muaither and later Al-Shamal.

== Personal life ==
Diliberto was born to an Italian father and a Dutch mother.
