= Issa Abu Issa =

Qatari businessman

- عيسى عبد السلام أبو عيسى
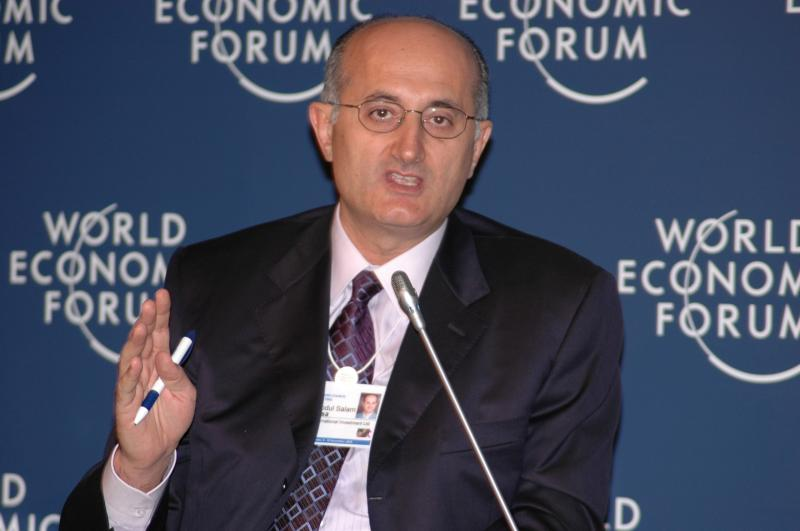
- Issa Abdul Salam Abu Issa
- Born: Issa Abdul Salam Abu Issa; 20 September 1955 (age 70); Doha, Qatar
- Education: B Sc in Business Administration from the United States International University
- Occupations: Businessman, Investor

Issa Abdul Salam Abu-Issa (Arabic: عيسى عبد السلام أبو عيسى; born 20 September 1955) is a business magnate from Qatar. He is the chairman and chief executive officer of Salam International Investment Limited. He was ranked 43rd in the Arabian Business Qatar Power List 2012.

== Education and career ==
Abu Issa studied in and obtained a Bachelor of Science degree in Business Administration in 1978 from the United States International University in San Diego, California, United States.

On the international front, he holds membership in the World Economic Forum and The Arab Business Council.

=== Salam International Investment Limited (SIIL) ===
Under Abu Issa's leadership, SIIL has experienced much growth and development. In 2006, due to the rise of capital and expansion, the company planned to build new office buildings and towers in Lusail. In 2009, SIIL planned to pick up a stake in the Jumana Tower building at The Pearl Island. The company recently planned to establish a new investment bank in Lebanon along with other shareholders with a $30 million capital.

It has been recently voted as one of Forbes Middle East’s Top 200 companies in the Middle East Region.
