= Power International Holding =

Qatari-based conglomerate

- Type: Private
- Industry: Construction, Real Estate, Agriculture, Lifestyle, Services
- Headquarters: Lusail, Qatar
- Key people: Moutaz Al-Khayyat (Group Chairman); Ramez Al-Khayyat (Group CEO)
- Number of employees: 65,000
- Website: powerholding-intl.com

Power International Holding is a Qatari-based conglomerate founded by Syrian-Qatari entrepreneurs Moutaz Al-Khayyat and Ramez Al-Khayyat.

The group’s portfolio sits across five main sectors: General Contracting, Real Estate Development, Agriculture & Food Industries, Lifestyle, Entertainment and Hospitality, and Services. The group of companies employs over 65,000 staff.

Founded in 2011, the company is headquartered in Doha, Qatar, and operates in over 24 countries through more than 400 subsidiaries.

Through its construction subsidiaries, Power International Holding has completed projects including the Mall of Qatar, Banana Island, Lekhwiya Stadium and the Doha Sheraton Hotel and Convention Centre in Qatar. International projects include the luxury Waldorf Astoria hotel in the Maldives.

In February 2020, Power International Holding’s real estate subsidiary ASSETS announced the completion of the 23-storey residential Baywalk Tower in The Pearl Island.

Power International Holding is the parent company of Baladna Food Industries, founded in 2014. The company and its founders rose to prominence in 2017 during the Qatar blockades, air lifting in 4,000 Holstein cows and making the state self-sufficient in dairy production. The company constructed specialized cowsheds equipped with temperature-control systems to create a suitable environment for the cattle despite Qatar’s arid climate.

By June 2019, Baladna stated it was supplying more than half of Qatar’s fresh milk supply and had begun exporting to other nations. The company is listed on the Qatar Stock Exchange.

In March 2021, Power International Holding joined the United Nations Global Compact, the world’s largest corporate sustainability initiative. In March 2022, the company became a signatory to the UN's Women’s Empowerment Principles, a business framework aimed to empower women in the workplace, established by the United Nations Global Compact and UN Women.

In September 2022, the company was listed by Forbes as one of the Middle East's Top 100 Arab Family Businesses, ranking thirteenth.

== Group of companies ==
Companies within Power International Holding’s portfolio are held by several main subsidiaries, which have further expanded vertically and horizontally:

- UCC Holding
- Baladna Q.P.S.C
- Estithmar Holding
- ASSETS Real Estate Development
- Aura Group
- TMT Group

=== Urbacon Trading and Contracting LLC (UCC) ===
Urbacon Trading and Contracting LLC (UCC) is a subsidiary of UCC Holding. The company was founded by Moutaz Al-Khayyat and Ramez Al-Khayyat in 2011. The company's revenues were $1,192 million USD in 2013, according to Engineering News-Record (ENR). UCC was ranked 194th in the 2019 ENR’s top 250 Global Contractors list.

The company was responsible for the construction of the 4,176,000-sq-ft Mall of Qatar, at an estimated cost of $1billion USD. UCC was named Developer of the Year at the 2016 Global RLI Awards, and won the Retail Leadership Award at the 2016 Asia Retail Congress for its work on the project. The company was the lead contractor for the 20,000-sq-m Lekhwiya Sports Stadium. The stadium opened in February 2013 and will function as a training venue during the 2022 FIFA World Cup in Qatar.

In 2015, UCC was awarded a $466 million USD contract to design and build the economic zone in Ras Bufontas, near Hamad International Airport, in a joint venture with Spanish construction company Sacyr. The company was contracted to refurbish the Sheraton Doha Hotel and Convention Centre in 2014, and was appointed to renovate the Doha Marriott Hotel in late 2019. In January 2020, the company was awarded three public infrastructure contracts by Qatar’s Public Works Authority, Ashghal, worth a combined 1.49 billion QAR. In 2022, UCC was ranked 105 in ENR’s Top Global Contractors.
