= Estithmar Holding =

Qatari holding company

Estithmar Holding QPSC
- Type: holding company
- Industry: healthcare, services, ventures, contracting & industries, financial investments
- Founded: 2022 in Doha, Qatar
- Headquarters: Doha, Qatar
- Key people: Moutaz Al-Khayyat, Chairman; Ramez Al-Khayyat, Vice Chairman & President
- Website: www.estithmarholding.com

Estithmar Holding QPSC is a holding company headquartered in Doha, Qatar, that manages 129 companies across 10 countries. The company's chairman is Moutaz Al-Khayyat, who also serves as Chairman of Power International Holding, UCC Holding, Baladna QPSC, Assets Group, Aura Group, and TMT Group.

The company is listed on the Qatar Stock Exchange and had a market capitalization of 4.6 billion USD in 2025.

== History ==
Estithmar Holding, formerly Elegancia Group, was part of a 2022 reverse merger that created the company as it is known today. Estithmar Holding went public on the Qatar Stock Exchange in 2022 under the IGRD ticker symbol.

In 2022, Estithmar Holding expanded into the healthcare, services, real estate & touristic development and contracting & industries sectors. Many of Estithmar Holding's projects in Qatar were also opened in 2022, such as The View Hospital, Al Maha Island, Lusail Winter Wonderland, Katara Hills LXR resort, and Maysan Doha LXR resort.

During the FIFA World Cup 2022, Elegancia Services, a subsidiary of Estithmar Holding, secured major services for the tournament, including catering, facilities management, security, and resources.

In 2023, the company's subsidiary Elegancia Arabia expanded into Saudi Arabia, which would soon engage in mega projects like Neom, Red Sea Global, and Shura Island. Also in 2023, the company signed a memorandum of understanding with the Algerian Investment Fund to launch the Algerian Qatari German Hospital.

In 2024, Estithmar Holding launched projects like Rixos Baghdad Hotel & Residences and Rosewood Maldives. The company also signed more agreements with regional governments to manage and operate healthcare facilities, such as Al Imam Al Hassan Al Mujtaba Hospital, Karbala, Iraq; Al Nasiriyah Teaching Hospital, Dhi Qar Governorate, Iraq; and Misrata Heart and Cardiovascular Center, Misrata, Libya. The Korean Medical Center in Lusail was also opened in 2024.

In September 2024, Estithmar Holding listed its Sukuk on the London Stock Exchange, which was the first Qatari riyal listing on the exchange.

== See also ==
- Power International Holding
- UCC Holding
- Baladna (company)
- Moutaz Al-Khayyat
- Ramez Al-Khayyat
