= Roberto Firmino =

Brazilian footballer (born 1991)

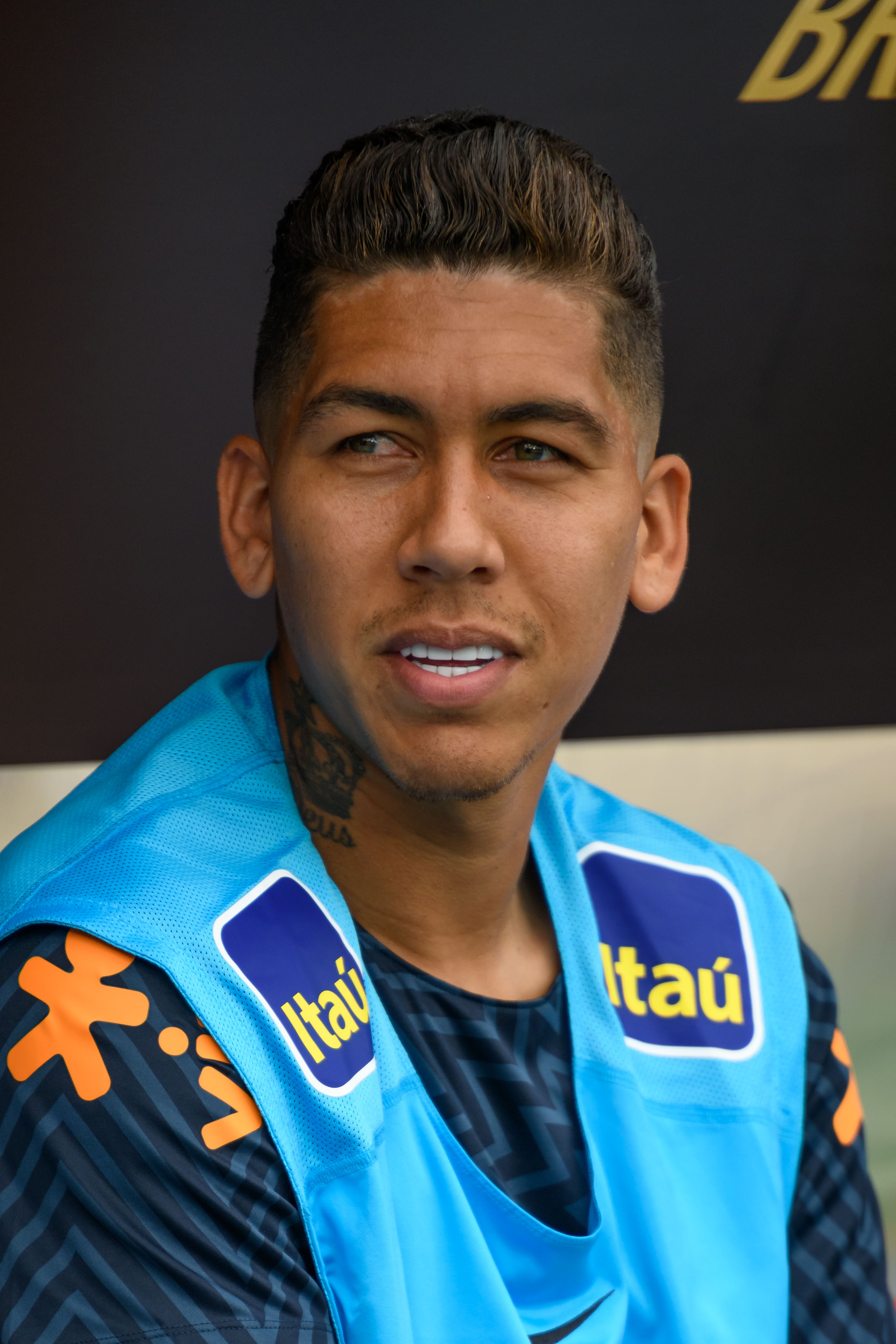
- Firmino with Brazil in 2018

Personal information
- Full name: Roberto Firmino Barbosa de Oliveira
- Date of birth: 2 October 1991 (age 35)
- Place of birth: Maceió, Brazil
- Height: 1.81 m (5 ft 11 in)
- Positions: Forward; attacking midfielder

Team information
- Current team: Al Sadd
- Number: 9

Youth career
- 2004–2008: CRB
- 2008–2009: Figueirense

Senior career*
Years	Team	Apps	(Gls)
2009–2011	Figueirense	38	(8)
2011–2015	TSG Hoffenheim	140	(38)
2015–2023	Liverpool	256	(82)
2023–2025	Al-Ahli	49	(14)
2025–	Al Sadd	27	(18)

International career
2014–2021	Brazil	55	(17)
Medal record
Men's football
Representing Brazil
Copa América
Winner	2019 Brazil
Runner-up	2021 Brazil
- * Club domestic league appearances and goals as of 23:55, 18 October 2026 (UTC)

Roberto Firmino Barbosa de Oliveira (born 2 October 1991) is a Brazilian professional footballer who plays as a forward or attacking midfielder for Qatar Stars League club Al Sadd.

After starting his career with Figueirense in 2009, Firmino spent four and a half seasons at TSG Hoffenheim. His 16 goals in 33 games in the 2013–14 Bundesliga season earned him the award for the league's Breakthrough Player. In July 2015, he signed for Liverpool. In the 2018–19 season, Firmino won the UEFA Champions League, and the following campaign claimed the UEFA Super Cup, FIFA Club World Cup (after scoring the winner in the final), and the 2019–20 Premier League title. He also won the FA Cup and EFL Cup with Liverpool in the 2021–22 season. Firmino is widely regarded as a cult hero in Liverpool. In 2023, Firmino decided not to extend his contract at Liverpool, and eventually left on a free transfer to Saudi club Al-Ahli, after eight years in England. With Al-Ahli, Firmino won the AFC Champions League Elite two years later.

Firmino made his international debut for Brazil in November 2014. He represented the nation at the 2015, 2019 and 2021 Copa América, where he won the 2019 edition of the tournament. He also represented the nation at the 2018 FIFA World Cup.

== Early life ==
Firmino was born in the Trapiche da Barra neighbourhood of Maceió, Alagoas, growing up near the Estadio Rei Pele. He grew up in a poor family and was described as being "humble" and "football mad". His father Jose was a street vendor and his mother was a housewife. He also has a sister. Firmino began playing for his school team, earning a trial at local club CRB. At 13, Firmino joined the youth team of CRB. He initially wore the No 5 shirt, which in Brazil is reserved for the most defensive midfielder. When required, he also played as a defender.

== Club career ==
=== Early career ===
Firmino joined Figueirense's youth setup in 2008, aged 17, after starting out at CRB. He was discovered by a dentist, Marcellus Portella. With the latter, he was mainly used as a defensive midfielder.

Firmino made his first-team debut on 24 October 2009, coming on as a half-time substitute in a 2–1 home loss against Ponte Preta in Série B.

Firmino scored his first goal on 8 May 2010, with the winner in an away win against São Caetano. He contributed with eight goals in 36 appearances during the season, as Figueirense FC returned to Série A after a two-year absence.

=== TSG Hoffenheim ===
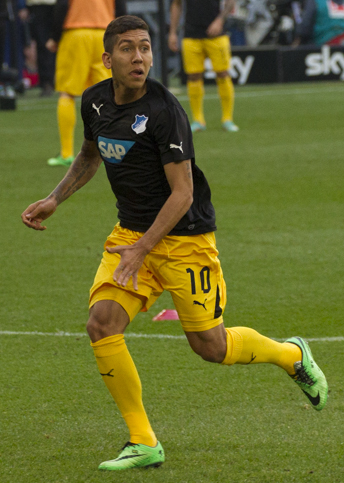
Firmino playing for TSG Hoffenheim in 2014

Firmino signed with TSG Hoffenheim in December 2010, with the contract running until June 2015. He formally arrived at Hoffenheim on 1 January 2011. Then Hoffenheim manager Ernst Tanner commented that they were "pleased to hire a Brazilian talent". He made his debut a month after his signing in a Bundesliga defeat against Mainz 05, where he came on as a 75th-minute substitute for Sebastian Rudy. He scored his first goal for the club on 16 April, the only goal of a league victory against Eintracht Frankfurt. He was dropped from the first-team squad along with Chinedu Obasi at the end of November 2011 for showing up late for training, missing the league match against Bayer Leverkusen. He scored two more goals that season, against Wolfsburg and Borussia Mönchengladbach. In the 2012–13 season, Firmino made 36 appearances and scored seven goals in all competitions. In July 2013, Russian club Lokomotiv Moscow made a €12 million bid for Firmino. Hoffenheim captain Andreas Beck hailed Firmino's development as "outstanding" in August 2013. On 27 March 2014, Firmino extended his contract with the club, signing a three-year extension. He finished the 2013–14 Bundesliga season tied as the fourth highest scorer with 16 goals, and was named the league's Breakthrough Player.

=== Liverpool ===
==== 2015–2017: Early years ====
On 23 June 2015, Hoffenheim and Firmino agreed terms for him to transfer to Premier League club Liverpool for up to £29 million on conclusion of the tournament, subject to a work permit. Liverpool confirmed the signing the following day, subject to a medical. The deal was finalised on 4 July. Firmino made his debut on 9 August, replacing Jordon Ibe for the final 12 minutes of a 1–0 win away to Stoke City. On 21 November, Firmino scored his first goal for Liverpool in a 4–1 victory over Manchester City at the City of Manchester Stadium. This came after new manager Jürgen Klopp moved Firmino to centre-forward ahead of Christian Benteke. In January 2016, Firmino was described by Paul Little of the Irish Examiner as steadily improving during his first season in England, although an inability to combine with centre forward Christian Benteke drew criticism.

However, in 2016, Firmino's form improved as Klopp played him alone up front in a false 9 role. He scored braces against Arsenal and Norwich City that month; the latter performance, in which he also assisted in a 5–4 win, earned comparisons to Raheem Sterling and Luis Suárez. With his form improved, Firmino was voted to be Liverpool's Player of the Month in January. On 10 March he scored his first Europa League goal for Liverpool in a 2–0 win over rivals Manchester United at Anfield. Firmino ended the season as Liverpool's league top scorer with 10 goals.

On 23 August, Firmino scored his first goal of the 2016–17 season, scoring in a 5–0 win over Burton Albion in the second round of the EFL Cup. Firmino scored his first league goals of the season in a 4–1 win over Leicester City, scoring a brace, on 10 September. Thus, Firmino became the first player to score in front of Anfield's new Main Stand in that game. On 29 October, Firmino scored in a 4–2 win over Crystal Palace, and on 6 November he scored in a 6–1 over Watford; the latter result saw Liverpool move to 1st position in the league table, the first time under Klopp. Firmino finished the season with 11 goals in 35 appearances in the Premier League, and 12 in 41 in all competitions.

==== 2017–18 season: Champions League runner-up ====
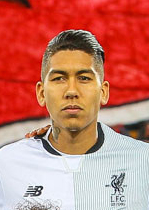
Firmino with Liverpool in 2017

Before the start of the 2017–18 season, Firmino switched his shirt number to 9, with new signing Mohamed Salah taking his number 11. Firmino scored his first goal of the new season on 12 August, scoring a penalty in a 3–3 draw with Watford. On 23 August, Firmino scored in a 4–2 win over his former club TSG Hoffenheim in the second leg of the UEFA Champions League play-off, with Liverpool winning 6–3 on aggregate to qualify for the 2017–18 UEFA Champions League group stage. On 6 December, he scored in a historic 7–0 win over Spartak Moscow in the Champions League. On 17 December, he scored in a 4–0 away win over AFC Bournemouth, a result which saw Liverpool become the first team in Premier League history to win four consecutive away games by a margin of at least three goals.

On 5 January 2018, during a FA Cup match against rivals Everton, Firmino was the subject of controversy following a clash with Everton defender Mason Holgate. Holgate pushed Firmino into the advertising boards, which was followed by the pair exchanging words, with Firmino seemingly insulting the player. Following the match, Holgate accused Firmino of racially abusing him, which he denied. A day later, the Football Association opened an investigation on the matter. Nearly two months later, after they had taken statements from 12 different players, several referees and consulted two Portuguese lip-readers, the Football Association cleared Firmino of any offence as a result of "insufficient evidence".

On 14 January 2018, Firmino scored in a 4–3 home win over Manchester City, which saw Liverpool end City's unbeaten league run. On 27 January, Firmino scored and missed a penalty in a 2–3 defeat to West Bromwich Albion in the fourth round of the FA Cup. On 14 February, Firmino scored in a dominant 5–0 away win over Porto in the first leg of the Champions League round of sixteen. On 10 April, he scored in a 2–1 win over Manchester City in the second leg of the quarter-finals of the UEFA Champions League, which saw Liverpool advance to the semi-finals with a 5–1 aggregate win. On 29 April, Firmino signed a new long-term contract with Liverpool. Firmino started and played the whole 90 minutes in the 2018 Champions League final, with Liverpool losing 3–1 to Real Madrid.

During the season, Firmino, Mohamed Salah, Philippe Coutinho and Sadio Mané made up a prolific attacking quartet, dubbed the "Fab Four", in reference to the rock band The Beatles, also from the same city as the club. Following the mid-season exit of Coutinho, the three remaining players were dubbed as the "Fab Three", with the trio having a total of 91 goals between them at the end of the season. Firmino was Liverpool's joint top goalscorer in the Champions League, together with Salah, with 11 goals. Firmino was also included in the 2017–18 Champions League Squad of the Season. The 2017–18 season was Firmino's most prolific in his Liverpool career, as he scored 27 goals in all competitions.

==== 2018–19 season: Champions League victory ====
After going goalless in all three matches played in August, Firmino scored his first goal of the season in a 2–1 Premier League win over Leicester City on 1 September. On 15 September he scored in Liverpool's 2–1 league win over Tottenham Hotspur at Wembley Stadium, a game that saw him leave the field 15 minutes before the end with an eye injury. He came off the bench three days later to score the stoppage time winner in Liverpool's 3–2 Champions League win against Paris Saint-Germain at Anfield. On 29 December, Firmino scored his first Liverpool hat-trick in a 5–1 win over Arsenal, scoring two goals in three minutes and a second half penalty. On 19 January 2019, he scored Liverpool's 1,000th goal at Anfield in the Premier League era in a 4–3 win over Crystal Palace.

On 1 June, Firmino started for Liverpool in the 2019 Champions League final against Tottenham Hotspur, making a comeback after missing the last few weeks of the season with injury. Firmino played for 60 minutes before being substituted as Liverpool won the match 2–0 to claim the title.

==== 2019–20 season: Premier League title ====
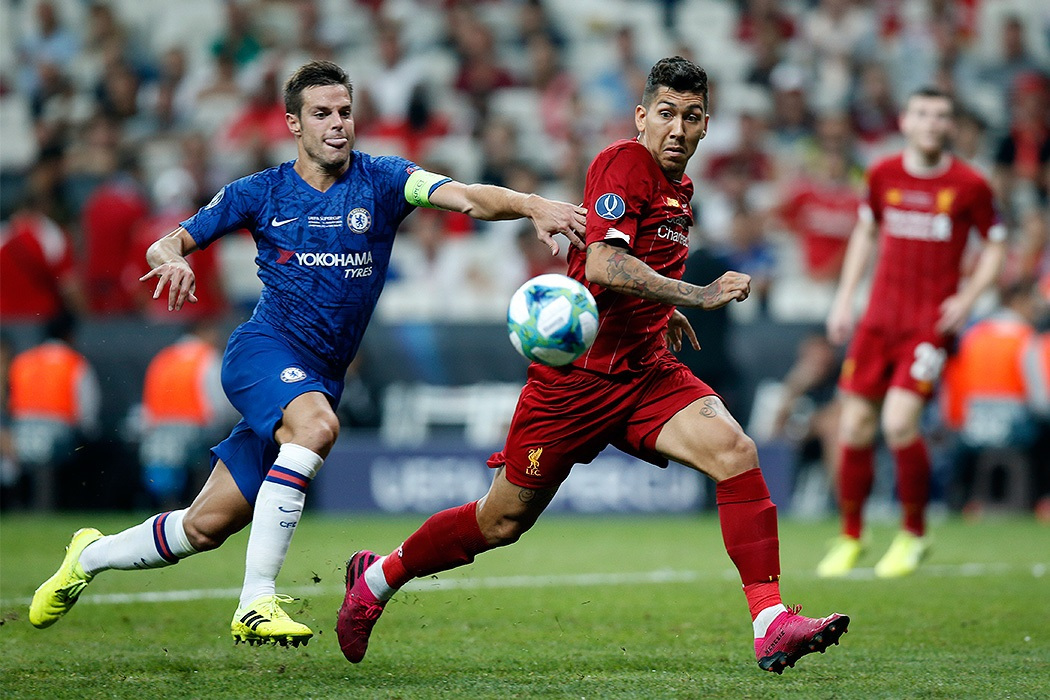
Firmino playing for Liverpool in the 2019 UEFA Super Cup

On 14 August 2019, Firmino came off the bench in the 2019 UEFA Super Cup against Chelsea in a match that Liverpool won 5–4 in a penalty shoot-out. The game had finished 2–2 after 120 minutes, with Firmino setting up both goals for Sadio Mané, before Firmino scored the first penalty in the shoot-out win. On 31 August, Firmino became the first Brazilian player to score 50 goals in the Premier League when he netted the third goal in a 3–0 win over Burnley.

At the 2019 FIFA Club World Cup in December, Firmino scored the winning goal in a 2–1 semi-final win over Monterrey. He was named man of the match in the final three days later after scoring the winner against Flamengo as Liverpool won the competition for the first time. Firmino also won the 2019–20 Premier League that season.

==== 2020–2023: Domestic double and departure ====
On 13 May 2021, he scored two goals in a 4–2 away win over Manchester United, in Liverpool's first victory at Old Trafford since March 2014. During their following match at West Bromwich Albion, Firmino captained Liverpool for the first time, as he was the longest serving player in the team. Thus, Firmino became the sixteenth player to wear the armband under Jürgen Klopp, with regular captain Jordan Henderson and vice captains James Milner, Virgil van Dijk, and Georginio Wijnaldum all either injured or on the bench, leading the Reds to a 2–1 victory. He missed the 2022 EFL Cup final due to injury. Firmino also earned a runners-up medal in the 2021–22 UEFA Champions League, losing the final to Real Madrid. Liverpool narrowly missed out on the chance to achieve a historic quadruple, coming second in the Premier League and the 2021–22 UEFA Champions League but winning both the EFL Cup and the FA Cup.

On 30 July 2022, Firmino started for Liverpool in the club's 3–1 win over Manchester City in the FA Community Shield at the King Power Stadium. Firmino scored his 100th goal for Liverpool on 27 August 2022 when he got two in the 9–0 win against AFC Bournemouth. On 5 March, Firmino scored the last of Liverpool's goals in a historic 7–0 victory against Manchester United. On 10 March 2023, Liverpool announced Firmino would leave Liverpool at the end of the 2022–23 season after he decided not to extend his contract. Liverpool manager Jürgen Klopp said he was a "little bit surprised" by the decision but wished Firmino good luck, saying that he would "be grateful forever" for his influence and impact at Liverpool. Firmino later said that it was "time" to leave the club. Former player Danny Murphy described him as a "cult hero" who the fans adored. Firmino scored a late equaliser against Aston Villa in his last home game for Liverpool at Anfield on 20 May 2023. Firmino also scored in his last ever game for Liverpool on 28 May 2023, being assisted by fellow Brazilian Fabinho. In homage to Firmino, a mural was painted in Liverpool, which he visited before his departure. At the end of the season, Liverpool narrowly missed out on Champions League qualification. Firmino concluded his playing career at Liverpool as the highest-scoring Brazilian player in both the history of Liverpool and the Premier League, with a total of 82 goals.

=== Al Ahli ===
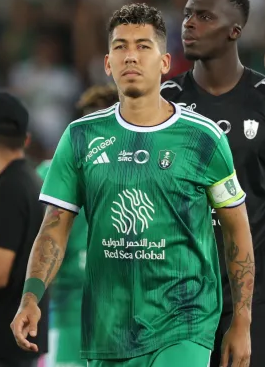
Firmino with Al Ahli in 2023

On 4 July 2023, Firmino joined Saudi Professional League club Al Ahli, signing a contract until 2026. On 11 August 2023, Firmino scored a hat-trick against Al-Hazem in his first competitive game for Al-Ahli.

On 3 May 2025, Firmino was a member of the Al-Ahli squad that won the 2025 AFC Champions League Elite for the first time in the club's history.

=== Al Sadd ===
On 24 July 2025, Firmino signed a two-year deal with Qatar Stars League club Al Sadd. He scored his first official goal for the club in a 2-0 win against Al-Gharafa

== International career ==
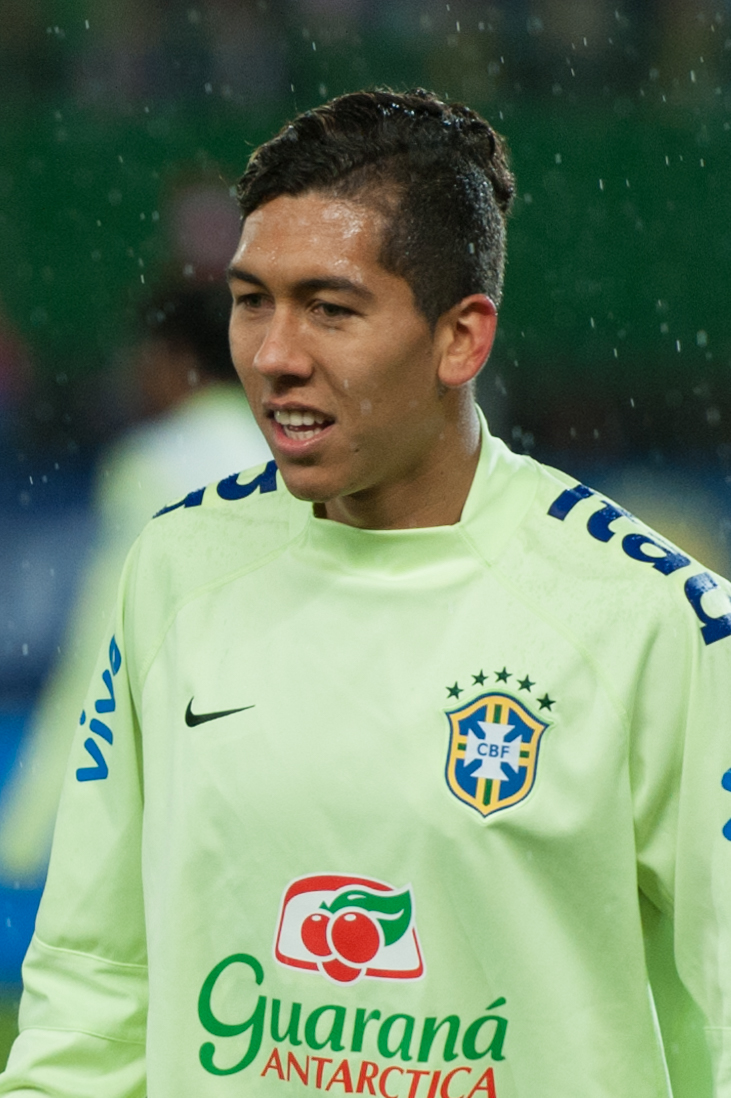
Firmino with Brazil in 2014.

Firmino said that it was his "dream" to play in the national team though he had no "contact with national team manager Dunga". On 23 October 2014, Firmino received his first call up to Brazil national team for the friendly matches against Turkey and Austria. He commented, "I'm very happy about the nomination and would especially like to thank the team". He debuted in a 4–0 win over Turkey on 12 November, replacing fellow debutant Luiz Adriano for the last 17 minutes. Firmino scored his first goal six days later in the latter match, a 2–1 away win.

In May 2015, Firmino was included in Brazil's 23-man squad for the 2015 Copa América to be held in Chile. On 21 June, he scored in a 2–1 defeat of Venezuela to qualify the Seleção for the knockout stage as Group C winners.

In May 2018, he was named in Brazil's 23-man squad for the 2018 FIFA World Cup in Russia. On 2 July, Firmino scored Brazil's second goal in a 2–0 win over Mexico in the round of 16 having come on as a late substitute.

In May 2019, Firmino was included in Brazil's 23-man squad for the 2019 Copa América. Firmino played all 90 minutes of the final against Peru as Brazil won 3–1 to lift their ninth Copa América title.

In June 2021, Firmino was included in Brazil's squad for the 2021 Copa América on home soil. He made a substitute appearance in his nation's 1–0 defeat to rivals Argentina in the final on 10 July.

Firmino was controversially not included in Brazil's squad for the 2022 World Cup in Qatar.

== Style of play ==
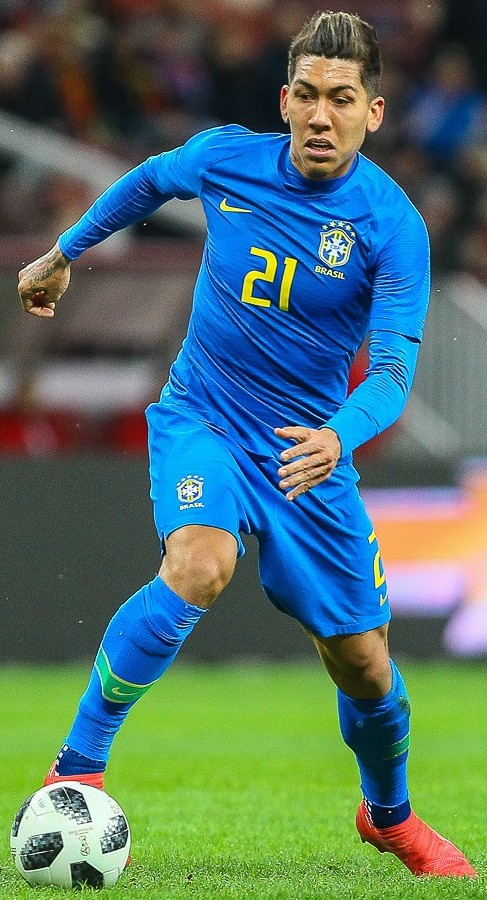
Firmino (pictured in 2018) is known for his creativity, link-up play, goalscoring and workrate.

Regarded at his peak as one of the greatest strikers in world football, Firmino is known for his clinical finishing, proficient technical ability and impressive workrate.

At Hoffenheim, Firmino primarily played as an attacking midfielder, or as a second striker, but was also used as a forward, winger or central midfielder, with Firmino using his speed, close control and vision wherever he is deployed. After initially starting as a left winger at Liverpool under Brendan Rodgers, new manager Jürgen Klopp used Firmino more centrally, often described as a False 9. In later seasons, especially from the 2020–21 season onward, Firmino has also often been used as a central attacking midfielder in a 4–2–3–1 formation, although tasked with significantly more pressing than a player typically does in such a position.

Ryan Babel, a teammate of Firmino's at Hoffenheim, described him as "a tricky player", saying that "he can dribble, shoot, he has a great shot, he can play a lot of through balls and his assists are very good", while also praising a heading ability which would not be common amongst other players of Firmino's slender build and relatively small stature, a unique trait which journalist and ESPN contributor Michael Cox has also noted. Babel also stated that Firmino had a humble mentality and no problems with attitude. Manager Hemerson Maria also stated that he was impressed with Firmino's "strong personality and mentality".

Due to his energy and defensive workrate off the ball, Klopp has referred to Firmino as the "engine" that propels the team's relentless counter-attacking system; "If he loses the ball, he fights for it back. If he loses it again, he fights for it. He looks like the engine of the team." The suitability of Firmino's playing style to Klopp's pressing system has meant that Firmino was referred to as "Liverpool's most important player" on several occasions during the 2016–17 and 2017–18 seasons. Due to Firmino's wide range of skills, Thierry Henry described him as "the most complete striker in the Premier League". Likewise, defender Nathan Aké identified him as his toughest opponent, as "he could do everything".

Firmino is also well known for his popular "no-look" goals. One of his best known goal celebrations, 'the Matador', features in the FIFA 19 video game.

== Personal life ==
Firmino married Larissa Pereira in his hometown in June 2017. They have three daughters. In November 2022 the couple announced they were expecting a fourth child. In addition to his native Portuguese, Firmino also speaks English and German. Firmino is a Christian and was baptised in 2020 in the swimming pool of Liverpool teammate Alisson. His cousin Selton Sánchez is also a professional footballer at Bilbao Athletic.

Firmino has been given the nickname "Bobby" by Liverpool supporters and players – a shortening of his first name "Roberto".

In December 2016, Firmino was arrested for drunk driving. He was fined £20,000 and had his driving licence revoked for a year when sentenced at Liverpool Magistrates' Court in February 2017.

In June 2024, Firmino became pastor of an evangelical church he founded in Maceio, Brazil, which he founded three years before alongside his wife Larissa Pereira and pastors Jairo Fernandes and Keila Medeiro. The dedication was held in his hometown of Maceio in the Manah Church.

== Career statistics ==
=== Club ===
As of match played 18 October 2026

Appearances and goals by club, season and competition
Club	Season	League			National cup (Note: Includes DFB-Pokal, FA Cup, King's Cup, Amir of Qatar Cup)		League cup (Note: Includes Football League Cup/EFL Cup, QSL Cup)		Continental		Other		Total	
Club	Season	Division	Apps	Goals	Apps	Goals	Apps	Goals	Apps	Goals	Apps	Goals	Apps	Goals
Figueirense	2009	Série B	2	0	0	0	—		—				2	0
Figueirense	2010	Série B	36	8	0	0	—		—				36	8
Figueirense	Total		38	8	0	0	—		—				38	8
TSG Hoffenheim	2010–11	Bundesliga	11	3	—		—		—		—		11	3
TSG Hoffenheim	2011–12	Bundesliga	30	7	3	0	—		—		—		33	7
TSG Hoffenheim	2012–13	Bundesliga	33	5	1	0	—		—		2 (Note: Appearances in Bundesliga relegation play-offs)	2	36	7
TSG Hoffenheim	2013–14	Bundesliga	33	16	4	6	—		—		—		37	22
TSG Hoffenheim	2014–15	Bundesliga	33	7	3	3	—		—		—		36	10
TSG Hoffenheim	Total		140	38	11	9	—		—		2	2	153	49
Liverpool	2015–16	Premier League	31	10	0	0	5	0	13 (Note: Appearances in UEFA Europa League)	1	—		49	11
Liverpool	2016–17	Premier League	35	11	2	0	4	1	—		—		41	12
Liverpool	2017–18	Premier League	37	15	2	1	0	0	15 (Note: Appearances in UEFA Champions League)	11	—		54	27
Liverpool	2018–19	Premier League	34	12	1	0	1	0	12	4	—		48	16
Liverpool	2019–20	Premier League	38	9	2	0	0	0	8	1	4 (Note: One appearance in FA Community Shield, one appearance in UEFA Super Cup, two appearances and two goals in FIFA Club World Cup)	2	52	12
Liverpool	2020–21	Premier League	36	9	2	0	0	0	9	0	1 (Note: Appearance in FA Community Shield)	0	48	9
Liverpool	2021–22	Premier League	20	5	5	1	3	0	7	5	—		35	11
Liverpool	2022–23	Premier League	25	11	0	0	1	0	8	2	1	0	35	13
Liverpool	Total		256	82	14	2	14	1	72	24	6	2	362	111
Al-Ahli	2023–24	Saudi Pro League	32	9	2	0	—		—		—		34	9
Al-Ahli	2024–25	Saudi Pro League	17	5	1	0	—		12 (Note: Appearances in AFC Champions League Elite)	6	1 (Note: Appearance in Saudi Super Cup)	1	31	12
Al-Ahli	Total		49	14	3	0	—		12	6	1	1	65	21
Al Sadd	2025–26	Qatar Stars League	21	13	2	0	2	0	9	4	1 (Note: Appearance in UAE–Qatar Challenge Cup)	2	35	19
Al Sadd	2026–27	Qatar Stars League	6	5	0	0	0	0	2	0	1 (Note: Appearance in Qatar Cup)	0	9	5
Al Sadd	Total		27	18	2	0	2	0	11	4	2	2	44	24
Career total			510	160	30	11	16	1	95	34	11	7	662	213

=== International ===
As of match played 10 July 2021

Appearances and goals by national team and year
National team	Year	Apps	Goals
Brazil	2014	2	1
Brazil	2015	9	3
Brazil	2016	2	1
Brazil	2017	5	0
Brazil	2018	11	3
Brazil	2019	15	5
Brazil	2020	4	3
Brazil	2021	7	1
Total		55	17

As of match played 10 July 2021
Scores and results list Brazil's goal tally first, score column indicates score after each Firmino goal

List of international goals scored by Roberto Firmino
No.	Date	Venue	Cap	Opponent	Score	Result	Competition	Ref.
1	18 November 2014	Ernst-Happel-Stadion, Vienna, Austria	2	Austria	2–1	2–1	Friendly	
2	29 March 2015	Emirates Stadium, London, England	4	Chile	1–0	1–0	Friendly	
3	10 June 2015	Estádio Beira-Rio, Porto Alegre, Brazil	6	Honduras	1–0	1–0	Friendly	
4	21 June 2015	Estadio Monumental David Arellano, Santiago, Chile	9	Venezuela	2–0	2–1	2015 Copa América	
5	6 October 2016	Arena das Dunas, Natal, Brazil	12	Bolivia	5–0	5–0	2018 FIFA World Cup qualification	
6	3 June 2018	Anfield, Liverpool, England	20	Croatia	2–0	2–0	Friendly	
7	2 July 2018	Cosmos Arena, Samara, Russia	24	Mexico	2–0	2–0	2018 FIFA World Cup	
8	7 September 2018	MetLife Stadium, East Rutherford, United States	26	United States	1–0	2–0	Friendly	
9	26 March 2019	Sinobo Stadium, Prague, Czech Republic	31	Czech Republic	1–1	3–1	Friendly	
10	9 June 2019	Estádio Beira-Rio, Porto Alegre, Brazil	32	Honduras	6–0	7–0	Friendly	
11	22 June 2019	Arena Corinthians, São Paulo, Brazil	35	Peru	2–0	5–0	2019 Copa América	
12	2 July 2019	Mineirão, Belo Horizonte, Brazil	37	Argentina	2–0	2–0	2019 Copa América	
13	10 October 2019	National Stadium, Kallang, Singapore	41	Senegal	1–0	1–1	Friendly	
14	9 October 2020	Arena Corinthians, São Paulo, Brazil	45	Bolivia	2–0	5–0	2022 FIFA World Cup qualification	
15	9 October 2020	Arena Corinthians, São Paulo, Brazil	45	Bolivia	3–0	5–0	2022 FIFA World Cup qualification	
16	13 November 2020	Estádio do Morumbi, São Paulo, Brazil	47	Venezuela	1–0	1–0	2022 FIFA World Cup qualification	
17	23 June 2021	Estádio Olímpico Nilton Santos, Rio de Janeiro, Brazil	52	Colombia	1–1	2–1	2021 Copa América	

== Honours ==
Liverpool

- Premier League: 2019–20
- FA Cup: 2021–22
- EFL Cup: 2021–22; runner-up: 2015–16
- FA Community Shield: 2022
- UEFA Champions League: 2018–19; runner-up: 2017–18, 2021–22
- UEFA Super Cup: 2019
- FIFA Club World Cup: 2019
- UEFA Europa League runner-up: 2015–16

Al-Ahli

- AFC Champions League Elite: 2024–25

Al Sadd

- Qatar Stars League: 2025–26
- Amir of Qatar Cup runner-up: 2026

Brazil

- Copa América: 2019; runner-up: 2021

Individual

- Bundesliga Breakthrough of the Season: 2013–14
- PFA Player of the Month: January 2016
- PFA Fans' Player of the Month: January 2016
- UEFA Champions League Squad of the Season: 2017–18
- Samba Gold: 2018
- IFFHS CONMEBOL Team of the Year: 2020
- AFC Champions League Elite Most Valuable Player: 2024–25

Records

- Highest-scoring Brazilian player in Premier League history: 82 goals
