= International Bank of Qatar =

IBQ (International Bank of Qatar)
- Type: Private company
- Industry: Banking
- Founded: 1 November 1956
- Defunct: April 2019
- Fate: Merged with Barwa Bank
- Headquarters: Doha, Qatar
- Products: Retail banking, Corporate banking, Private banking
- Website: www.ibq.com.qa

The International Bank of Qatar (Arabic: بنك قطر الدولي), often branded ibq, was a private sector bank operating in Qatar founded in 1956. The bank offered a range of products and services across retail, private and corporate banking divisions.

ibq had a growing network of branches and ATMs covering most major locations across the country. It merged with Barwa Bank in 2019.

== History ==
Starting as the Ottoman Bank on 1 November 1956, ibq underwent several ownerships in its history.

In 1969 the Ottoman Bank sold its branches to the National and Grindlays Bank which later became known as Grindlays. In 1989, the bank changed names again to ANZ Grindlays when it was acquired by the Australia & New Zealand Banking Group. In 2000, Standard Chartered acquired ANZ Grindlays.

In August 2004, the bank was renamed International Bank of Qatar (ibq), when National Bank of Kuwait (NBK) acquired a 20% stake in the bank and assumed management responsibilities. In July 2007, NBK increased its share of the bank to 30% and sold them back to Qatari investors in 2014.

In July 2015, ibq has received investment grade credit ratings of “A2” and “A+” assigned by Moody’s and Fitch Ratings, respectively.

In June 2018, ibq, Barwa Bank and Masraf Al Rayan ended negotiations on a proposed three-way merger. In August 2018, ibq and Barwa Bank reached a final merger agreement, the combined bank was to have total assets of QR80 billion. The legal merger was completed in April 2019. The merger combined the Islamic Barwa Bank with the conventional ibq. The merged bank operated as Barwa Bank and offered Shariah-compliant services. In October 2020, Barwa Bank was renamed Dukhan Bank.
