= José Luis Sierra =

José Luis Sierra may refer to:

- José Luis Sierra (footballer, born 1968), Chilean football coach and former player
- José Luis Sierra (footballer, born 1997), Chilean former footballer
- José Luis Mumbiela Sierra (born 1969), Spanish-born Kazakhstani Roman Catholic prelate and bishop
