= Gulf Drilling International =

Qatari oil and gas drilling company

- Type: Public
- Industry: Oil and gas
- Founded: May 2004
- Headquarters: 9th and 10th Floors, Palm Tower B, West Bay, Doha, Qatar
- Key people: Marcus Barraclough - CEO
- Products: Offshore drilling, Onshore drilling and associated services, Offshore accommodation, Liftboat and Offshore Platform support
- Owners: 2004-2007 • Qatar Energy (QP) 60% • Japan Drilling Company (JDC) 40% 2007-2008 • QatarEnergy (QP) 70% • Japan Drilling Company (JDC) 30% 2008 - 2014 • Gulf International Services Q.S.C. (GIS) 70% • Japan Drilling Company (JDC) 30% 1 May 2014 onward • Gulf International Services Q.S.C. (GIS) 100%,
- Parent: Gulf International Services
- Website: www.gdi.com.qa

Gulf Drilling International Limited (GDI) is a Qatari oil drilling company based in West Bay, Doha.

== History ==
Gulf Drilling International was established on 18 May 2004, as the first drilling contractor in Qatar, as a joint venture between QatarEnergy (QE) and Japan Drilling Co. Ltd. (JDC). In July 2007, QE acquired a 10% share from JDC, raising its ownership stake to 70%.

In April 2014, GIS signed a Declaration of Share Purchase Agreement (DSPA) with JDC to acquire JDC's remaining 30% shares of GDI. This made GDI a wholly owned subsidiary of GIS as of 1 May 2014.

Gulf International Services (GIS) is a public shareholding company listed on the Qatar Exchange and partly owned by QatarEnergy. It operates in the oil and gas services sector. GIS holds 100% of Gulf Helicopters Company Q.S.C. shares, Al-Koot Insurance and Reinsurance Company S.A.Q., and Amwaj Catering Services Q.S.C.

In May 2019, GDI was awarded six of the eight offshore jack-up drilling rigs for the North Field Expansion Project, with drilling activities beginning in January 2020. Following the award, GDI formed a 50:50 joint venture with Seadrill Limited to manage and operate five jack-up rigs with QatarEnergy. The five contracts are worth $656 million.

In 2024, GDI acquired the remaining 50% stake in the GulfDrill joint venture and three jack-up rigs from Seadrill.

== Services ==
GDI provides drilling rigs and related services to oil and gas exploration and production companies in Qatar and nearby regions. The company operates twelve offshore jack-up drilling rigs, seven land rigs, one accommodation barge, and two lift boats. GDI also manages a lift boat on behalf of its client under contract.

GDI is a major provider of offshore and onshore drilling services in Qatar. Its client base in Qatar includes QatarEnergy. International clients of GDI include Qatar Shell Services Company, North Oil Co., Occidental Petroleum of Qatar Ltd., Maersk Oil Qatar, Qatargas, JX-Nippon Oil & Gas Exploration, QatarEnergy Development Company, and Dolphin Energy Limited.

GDI's offshore jack-up rig Dukhan began operations in November 2014. In 2014, the company signed contracts with shipyards in Singapore and Qatar to build a new jack-up offshore drilling rig named Halul and a lift boat named Al-Safliya. Both assets have client contracts and began operations in 2016. Al-Safliya was the first newly built lift boat by GDI from a shipyard in Qatar.

GDI operates infrastructure and equipment to support its drilling activities, including crew accommodations, warehousing facilities, workshops, cranes, and transportation equipment.

== Fleet status ==
=== Offshore Jack-Up Rigs ===
As of December 2024, all of GDI's offshore jack-up rigs are on contract.

- Al-Bidda
- Al-Jassra
- Al-Khor
- Al-Wajba
- Al-Zubarah
- Dukhan
- Halul
- Laffan
- Les hat
- Mesaieed

=== Offshore Accommodation Barges ===
As of December 2024, GDI's only offshore accommodation barge is on contract.

- Zikreet

=== Lift Boats ===
As of December 2024, one of GDI's lift boats is on contract, while the other has a contract in place.

- Rumailah
- Al Safliya (Note: This lift boat has a contract in place as of December 2024.)

=== Onshore Rigs ===
As of December 2024, all of GDI's onshore rigs are on contract.

- GDI-1
- GDI-2
- GDI-3
- GDI-4
- GDI-5
- GDI-6
- GDI-7
- GDI-8
