= Salam International =

Salam International Investment Limited Q.P.S.C.
- Company type: Public
- Traded as: QE: SIIS
- Founded: 1952 as Salam Studio, current name since 2002
- Founder: Abdul Salam Abu Issa
- Headquarters: Doha, Qatar
- Number of locations: Qatar, United Arab Emirates, Palestine, Kuwait, Saudi Arabia, Oman, Bahrain, Jordan, Lebanon.
- Key people: Issa Abu Issa (Chairman); Abdulsalam Abu Issa (CEO)
- Website: www.SalamInternational.com

Salam International Investment Limited Q.P.S.C. is a publicly listed Qatar shareholding company. Salam International operates through its subsidiaries in Qatar, the United Arab Emirates, Palestine, Kuwait, Saudi Arabia, Oman, Bahrain, Jordan and Lebanon. The company is headquartered in Doha, Qatar.
