= Mall of Qatar =

- قطر مول
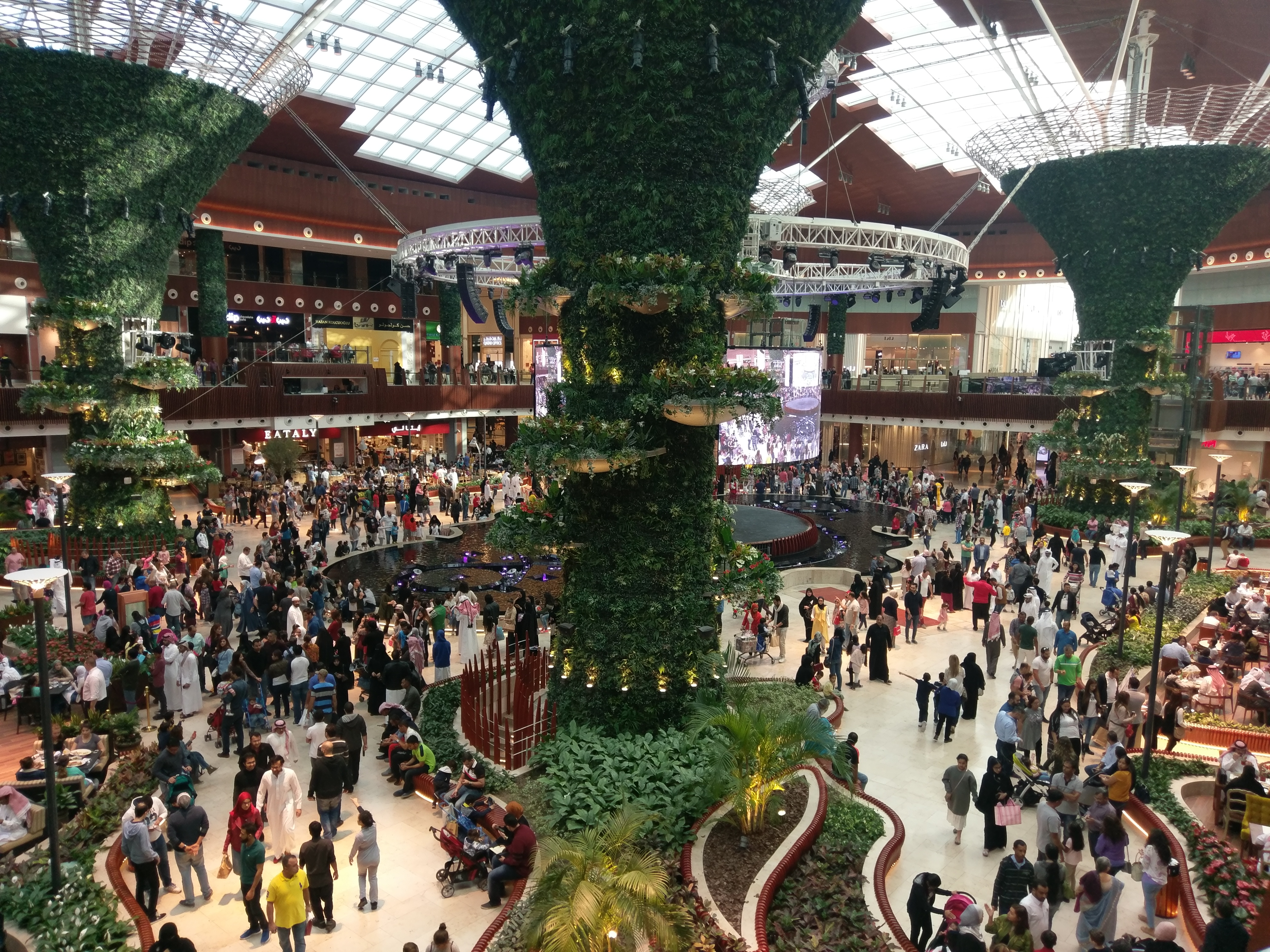
- Location: Rawdat Al Jahhaniya, Al Rayyan, Qatar
- Coordinates: 25.3255°N 51.345°E
- Opened: 10 December 2016; 9 years ago (Soft opening); 8 April 2017; 9 years ago (Grand opening)
- Developer: UrbaCon Trading & Contracting
- Architect: Chapman Taylor
- Num. of stores: 520
- Num. of anchor tenants: 5: Centerpoint; Debenhams; Salam Stores; Carrefour
- Floor area: 256,000 sq. m
- Floors: 3 floors
- Parking: 7,000 space car park
- Website: Mallofqatar.com.qa

The Mall of Qatar is a shopping mall that opened on 10 December 2016 in the Rawdat Al Jahhaniya district of Al Rayyan, Qatar. The mall was constructed by UCC Holding, a subsidiary of Power International Holding.

== History ==
In December 2013, the engineering company Drake & Scull Qatar was awarded the contract for mechanical, electrical and plumbing works for the Mall of Qatar. The cost for the construction of the mall was initially set around $660 million, but was increased to $1.48 billion in October 2015 after new hospitality and entertainment projects were added. Deals were signed with Abu Issa Holding to bring retail luxury goods among its offering, with M.H. Alshaya Co. to bring lifestyle and hospitality brands to the mall, with IMAX for the cineplex, and with the Majid Al Futtaim Group to open a Carrefour hypermarket in the mall.

On the day it opened, 220 stores were operating in the mall. The opening was patronized by Sheikh Hamad Bin Khalifa Al Thani.

In 2017, The Mall was awarded RLI International Retail & Leisure Destination Global Award. In 2020, expansion plans were announced that included 1,000 luxury residential units, a Sherborne School and a theme park. In December 2019, the Al Riffa Station of the Green Line opened with a bridge connecting to the mall and in December 2020, the Ahmad bin Ali Stadium was inaugurated, adjacent to the mall.

During the COVID-19 pandemic, for several months, the tenants of the mall were exempted from paying rent to cope with the lockdown situation.

== Description ==
The Mall of Qatar is a 464,515 sq. m, 3-floor shopping mall located in the Rawdat Al Jahhaniya district of Al Rayyan, Qatar. The high central glass dome is eight floors high.

The Mall of Qatar is adjacent to Ahmad bin Ali Stadium, one of the host stadiums for the 2022 FIFA World Cup.

== Incidents ==
On 2 April 2016, while under construction, the Mall of Qatar caught fire. All the 14,000 workers were evacuated safely. Another fire broke out on 30 October 2016 while the mall was still under construction.

== Transport links ==
=== Transport ===
Mall of Qatar is located next to the station Al Riffa / Mall of Qatar of the Doha Metro, Green Line as well as the station of the public busses of line number M212 of Metrolink . Also a cab rank, a bicycle parking faciality as well as a car park are avalible.

=== Barrier free accesability ===
Mall of Qatar has elevators and escalators as well as stepless access. Wheelchairs can be borrowed at the rection as well. There is no Braille or tactile paving for the blind yet.
