= BSI Steel =

Qatari steel company

BSI-Steel Building System Integration W.L.L
- Type: Privately owned company
- Industry: Pre-engineered building
- Founded: 2006; 20 years ago
- Area served: Qatar
- Products: PEB; Jib crane

Building System Integration (BSI-Steel) is an industrial company situated in the Doha New Industrial Area, Qatar. BSI-Steel is the first of its kind in Qatar for the design, manufacture and supply of steel buildings up to four floors. It is a different product from the traditional method of ready clips, where high voltage iron sheets are manufactured to bridges and columns to form the required iron building, occupying more space than the traditional method with decreased cost.

== History ==
BSI-Steel was set up to meet the requirements of the rapidly growing construction market in Qatar, where all pre-engineered metal buildings (PEBs) were imported from neighbouring countries. The company and its first factory in the Doha New Industrial Area were inaugurated by Dr.Mohammed Saleh Al Sada, Minister of State for Industry and Energy Affairs. The inauguration ceremony was attended by Al Sadah, some of his associates from the Ministry of Energy and Industry and a group of local Qatari businessmen. They launched operations in 2006 with a capacity of 100 to 150 tonnes per month (TPM). However, since the company moved to its new 10,000 m^{2} facility in the Doha New Industrial Area in October 2008, the company's output has increased tenfold. In 2010, BSI-Steel booked orders at a rate of 800 to 1,000 TPM and further increased its sales in 2011. They service Qatar and export markets by providing their clients with PEBs in the region.

== Operations and location ==
=== Factory ===
BSI-Steel's head office and plant are located in the New Industrial Area in Doha, located between Wakra and Mesaieed. BSI-Steel's facilities total about 10,000 m^{2}, this includes a cafeteria, clinic, office space and a 9,000 m^{2} plant facility. The plant is designed to accommodate state-of-the-art machinery that can fabricate up to 4,000 MT of PEBs per month, which includes 2,400 MT of frames (painted steel members), 800 MT of secondary "C" & "Z" galvanized members and 820MT of panels and panel accessories.

=== Management ===
The company is run by CEO Kazem Al Rubayai and company chairman Saad Aateek Muftah. The team is composed of executive management, engineering management (around 50 engineers), and management of production, management of quality control, quality management, and finally maintenance, and those in charge of the upgrading of equipment. The executive management and its technical team have experience of not less than twenty years, and more than thirty-five years for some members.

=== Manufacturing Division ===
BSI-Steel's manufacturing division is divided into four sections. The first of said sections manufactures ceiling panels, walls and partitions. Also, two sections for cutting, processing and manufacturing iron. Finally, one section cleans the manufactured iron and dye it according to order specifications. The engineering team complies with American design and building codes for the design and fabrication of its products. They utilize design and detailing software that is developed and sold by Metal Building Software (MBS). MBS software incorporates standard American codes that are applicable to the design and manufacturing of PEBs.

=== Projects ===
The company has acquired a number of projects in Qatar. These include the Gulf Mall at Al Gharafa, a VIP aircraft hangar at the Doha International Airport, a cold store warehouse, labour housing, a precast factory, an international school, and a giant logistics warehouse.
