= Nehmeh (company) =

Nehmeh Group is one of the oldest and established multidisciplined business enterprises in the State of Qatar. Headquartered in Doha, the company was founded in 1955 by Antoine Nehme.

== History ==
Nehmeh Group was established in 1955 by Lebanese businessman Antoine Nehme, who migrated to Qatar from Lebanon in 1953 with the aim of creating a business venture.

== Subsidiaries ==
=== Anton Nehmeh Establishment ===
As one of the oldest companies in operation in Qatar, Anton Nehmeh Establishment's offerings includes various performance tools and equipment for the automotive, construction, service and woodworking industries.

=== Nehmeh Entreprises & Industries ===
Nehmeh Entreprises & Industries (formerly known as National Radiator Factory) was originally established in early 1993 as the first manufacturer of heat exchangers in the country.

With a new corporate identity and a new facility, it has become the first manufacturing base of Air Handling Units to be made in Qatar.
