= Al-Shamal SC =

Multi-sports club in Qatar

Al-Shamal
- Full name: Al-Shamal Sports Club
- Founded: 1980; 46 years ago
- Ground: Al-Shamal SC Stadium
- Capacity: 5,300
- Chairman: Ibrahim Abdullah Hussein Al-Sada
- Head coach: David Prats
- League: Qatar Stars League
- 2025–26: Qatar Stars League, 2nd of 12
- Website: alshamal.qa
Home colours	Away colours

Al-Shamal Sports Club (Arabic: نادي الشمال الرياضي) is a Qatari multi-sports club based in Madinat ash Shamal. Al-Shamal was founded in 1980. Its football team competes in the Qatar Stars League, the top tier of the national football league system.

Through their history, the club has won 4 Qatar Stars League 2 title and 1 Sheikh Jassim Cup.

== History ==
Mohammed bin Badr Al-Sadah founded the club in 1980. Al-Sadah started his football administration career as a member of the Al Sadd Board of Directors in 1972, before founding and serving as the first president of Al-Shamal in 1980. With very few resources at their disposal, the team played its early matches on dirt pitches. The team's results in matches were sub-par initially, leading to the administration prioritising youth development. This led to the emergence of players such as Adnan Abdullah, the first Al-Shamal player to compete with the Qatar national team, and Jassim Al Muhaiza, who achieved the rare feat of playing for three age categories of the Qatar national team in one season.

The team's first coach was former Zamalek player Samir Kotb. He would be succeeded by his compatriot Ibrahim Al-Sheikh, who formerly played for Egypt's Al Nasr. Other early coaches include Sudanese former footballer Anwar Babiker, whose son later played professionally for the club as well as other clubs in Qatar and abroad, and Zaid Al-Sadah.

Initially, the club only had a football section, but in 1982 it branched out to handball, with early coaches for this category being Ezz El-Din Bin Sultan and Ramadan Madani Abdel-Al. In the following years, the club established teams in other sports, starting with volleyball, under the supervision of Abdel-Azim Bayoumi and Mamdouh Ali, and followed by table tennis, which was overseen by a Chinese coach. Following these were the additions of sections for basketball, whose early coaches included Hassan Youssef and Mohammed Hamed, and athletics, which was first coached by Ahmed Al-Maghrabi, followed by Qadri Bakri. During this period of the club's history, age categories for the football team were also formed.

Among the earliest accomplishments of the club was its youth football team coming in third place in the General Youth League in 1982–83. In 1983, Abel Verônico took charge of the senior team. Under his leadership, the club won its first championship, the 1985–86 edition of the Qatari 2nd Division. This ensured their promotion to the country's top tier of football for the first time ever, taking part in the 1986–87 Qatar Stars League. They would go on to win the Arab Peace Championship, a regional tournament, in 1995. Their most notable triumph was winning the 1996 Sheikh Jassim Cup.

In 2001, Al-Shamal administration successfully acquired ownership of the club's headquarters from the Ministry of Health. In 2011, the club opened its home stadium, Al-Shamal SC Stadium in Madinat ash Shamal. It has emerged as a prominent local landmark in the city. Aside from accommodating the club's sports teams, it also features a banquet hall and a lecture hall.

In 2021, Al-Shamal won their fourth 2nd division title after winning the 2020–21 Qatar Stars League 2 season.

=== AFC Champions League Elite debut ===
Al-Shamal then finished the 2025–26 Qatar Stars League as runners-up where the club then qualified to the 2026–27 AFC Champions League Elite campaign.

== Stadium ==
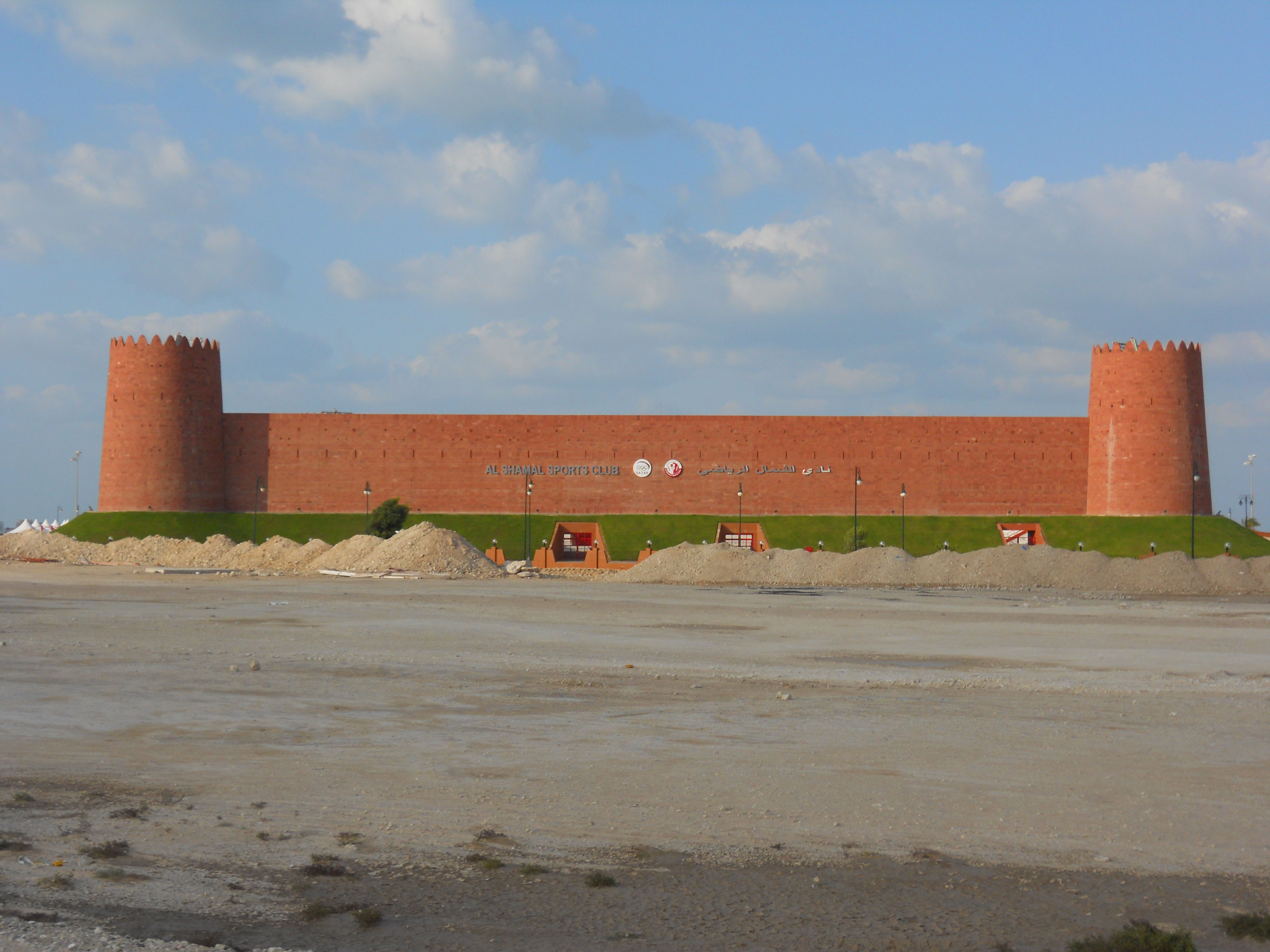
View of the Al-Shamal Stadium

Modeled after the historic Al Zubara Fort, the Al-Shamal Stadium serves as the club's home grounds and is renowned for its unique design, with its red bricks being imported from India. It was opened in 2011.

Spread over an area of 84,000 m^{2} in Madinat ash Shamal, the stadium had an original seating capacity of 3,500 spectators, though this was later increased to a 5,000 seating capacity. The club also has an indoor sports hall, with a capacity for 500 spectators, which is used by its handball, volleyball and basketball teams. Furthermore, an athletics field and a football training field can be found at the venue.

== Players ==
As of 17 October 2026:

=== First team ===
Note: Flags indicate national team as defined under FIFA eligibility rules; some limited exceptions apply. Players may hold more than one non-FIFA nationality.

No.	Pos.	Nation	Player
1	GK	QAT	Ali Ghulais
2	DF	QAT	Mouafak Awad
3	DF	QAT	Abdelkarim Hassan
4	DF	ESP	Pablo Marí
5	MF	TUN	Mohamed Ali Ben Romdhane
6	DF	QAT	Musab Kheder
7	FW	ALG	Mohamed Rafik Omar
8	MF	QAT	Ali Assadalla
10	MF	ESP	Álex Collado
11	FW	ALG	Baghdad Bounedjah
14	MF	GHA	Omar Ali
15	DF	QAT	Hussain Bahzad
16	DF	URU	Federico Bais
17	MF	QAT	Abdullah Al-Ahrak (on loan from Al-Duhail)
18	MF	QAT	Adel Bader
20	DF	SEN	Youssouf Sabaly

No.	Pos.	Nation	Player
22	FW	FRA	Wesley Saïd
23	DF	PLE	Michel Termanini
24	DF	COL	Jeison Murillo
26	FW	ALG	Riyad Mahrez
27	MF	BHR	Ahmed Sayyar
28	MF	ALG	Nassim Benaissa
34	MF	MAR	Mohamed Rabie Hrimat
45	GK	QAT	Abdullah Al-Radhi
47	DF	IRQ	Fahad Waad
67	GK	QAT	Saoud Al Khater
70	MF	POR	Tiago Silva
78	FW	QAT	Ahmad Al-Saeed
95	GK	SEN	Babacar Seck
—	MF	QAT	Marwan Brimil
—	FW	GUI	Ibrahima Coulibaly

=== Al-Shamal Future ===
Note: Flags indicate national team as defined under FIFA eligibility rules; some limited exceptions apply. Players may hold more than one non-FIFA nationality.

No.	Pos.	Nation	Player
19	FW	QAT	Mohammed Al-Quraishi
25	DF	CAN	Yassine Aouida
26	MF	LBA	Abdalhamid Naser
29	MF	QAT	Amjad Mustafa
30	MF	QAT	Abdulla Al-Sada
32	MF	QAT	Anas Ramadan
33	DF	QAT	Ahmed Hagana
37	FW	QAT	Mohamed Moujauir
38	FW	QAT	Mohamed Benbella
40	GK	SDN	Abdulrahman Hagana

No.	Pos.	Nation	Player
44	DF	BRA	Murillo Ramos
50	GK	QAT	Shahin Shah Khel
66	DF	SDN	Muaiad Waleed
74	MF	QAT	Mohammed Al-Shiwi
77	FW	SDN	Yazan Ismat
80	MF	LBN	Mohammed Hankir
88	MF	QAT	Yusuf Adel
89	MF	JOR	Khaled Nazzal
99	MF	LBN	Adham El-Habbas

=== Out on loan ===
Note: Flags indicate national team as defined under FIFA eligibility rules; some limited exceptions apply. Players may hold more than one non-FIFA nationality.

No.	Pos.	Nation	Player
—	MF	IRI	Omid Ebrahimi (on loan to Lusail)
—	MF	QAT	Osman Busati (at Qatar U23)

No.	Pos.	Nation	Player
—	MF	SEN	Mouhamed Dabo (at Al-Khor)
—	FW	TUN	Youssef Snana (on loan to Al-Arabi)

== Technical and staff ==
Position	Name
Head coach	(Spain) David Prats
Assistant coach	(Spain) Toni Lobo (Spain) Sergi Angulo (Qatar) Khalid Al-Ansari
Goalkeeper coach	(Spain) Javier Ruiz
Fitness coach	(Spain) Paulino Granero
Match Analysis	(Qatar) Mahmoud El-Tahir
Opponent Analyst	(Spain) Sergio García
Sports Director	(Qatar) Mishaal Muqbil Al Ali
Media and Marketing Director	(Qatar) Taha Issa Al Muhaiza
Doctor	(Qatar) Osama Masoud
Physiotherapist	(Qatar) Ibarhim Abdulnaser
Performance Analyst	(Qatar) Salman Nazzal
Technical director	(Qatar) Nasser Jawal

== Honours ==
=== Domestic ===
- Qatar Stars League 2
  - Winners (4): 1985–86, 2002–03, 2014–15, 2020–21
- Sheikh Jassim Cup
  - Winners (1): 1996

=== Regional ===
- Arab Peace Championship
  - Winners (1): 1995

== Managerial history ==
As of 16 May 2023

- (Egypt) Samir Kotb (1980–??)
- (Egypt) Ibrahim Al-Sheikh
- (Sudan) Anwar Babakir
- (Qatar) Zaid Al-Sadah
- (Brazil) Abel Verônico (1983–87)
- (Egypt) Ibrahim Al-Sheikh (1987)
- (Brazil) Cabralzinho (1988)
- (England) Allan Jones (1995–98)
- (Brazil) Procópio Cardoso (1999)
- (Iraq) Adnan Dirjal (1999)
- (Tunisia) Mohamed Arfaoui (1999–00)
- (Egypt) Maher Siddiq (2000)
- (Qatar) Hemdan Hamad (2000)
- (Morocco) Abdelkadir Bu Hamid (2000–01)
- (Brazil) Luisinho Lemos (2001–02)
- (Germany) Uli Maslo (2002–03)
- (Switzerland) Robert Mullier (2003)
- (Brazil) Valdeir Vieira (Dec 2003 – 4 Jan)
- (Switzerland) Robert Mullier (Jan 2004–05)
- (Brazil) Stefano Impagliazzo (2005)
- (Germany) Reinhard Fabisch (2005)
- (Switzerland) Robert Mullier (2005–06)
- (Brazil) Fernando Dourado (2006)
- (Brazil) Adilson Fernandes (Jul 2006 –8 Mar)
- (Brazil) Sebastião Rocha (2008)
- (France) Stephane Morello (Oct 2008 –9 Jan)
- (Brazil) José Paulo (2009)
- (Brazil) Robertinho (2009 –9 Nov)
- (France) Alain Michel (Nov 2009 –10 Jun)
- (Tunisia) Wajdi Essid (2010)
- (Brazil) Luisinho Lemos (Sep 2010 –12 Feb)
- (Brazil) José Paulo (Feb 2012 –12 Aug)
- (Romania) Costică Ștefănescu (Aug 2012 –Dec 2012)
- (Netherlands) Silvio Diliberto (Dec 2012–2014)
- (Serbia) Dragan Cvetković (Jan 2015–May 2015)
- (Brazil) Adilson Fernandes (Jul 2015–Jun 2016)
- (Romania) Ilie Stan (Jul 2016–Jan 2017)
- (Serbia) Slavko Matić (Jan 2017–Oct 2017)
- (Netherlands) Silvio Diliberto (Oct 2017–2018)
- (Serbia) Darko Novic (Sep 2018–2020)
- (Morocco) Hicham Jadrane (Jul 2020–Jun 2022)
- (Spain) Hisham Zahid (Jul 2022–Feb 2023)
- (Qatar) Wesam Rizik (Feb 2023–Jun 2023)
- (Iran) Poya Asbaghi (Jun 2023–July 2024)
- (Portugal) Nuno Almeida (July 2024–December 2024)
- (Oman) Ahmed Kano (December 2024)
- (Spain) David Prats (December 2024–present)
