= Al Rayan Bank UK =

Sharia-compliant commercial bank in the UK

Al Rayan Bank PLC
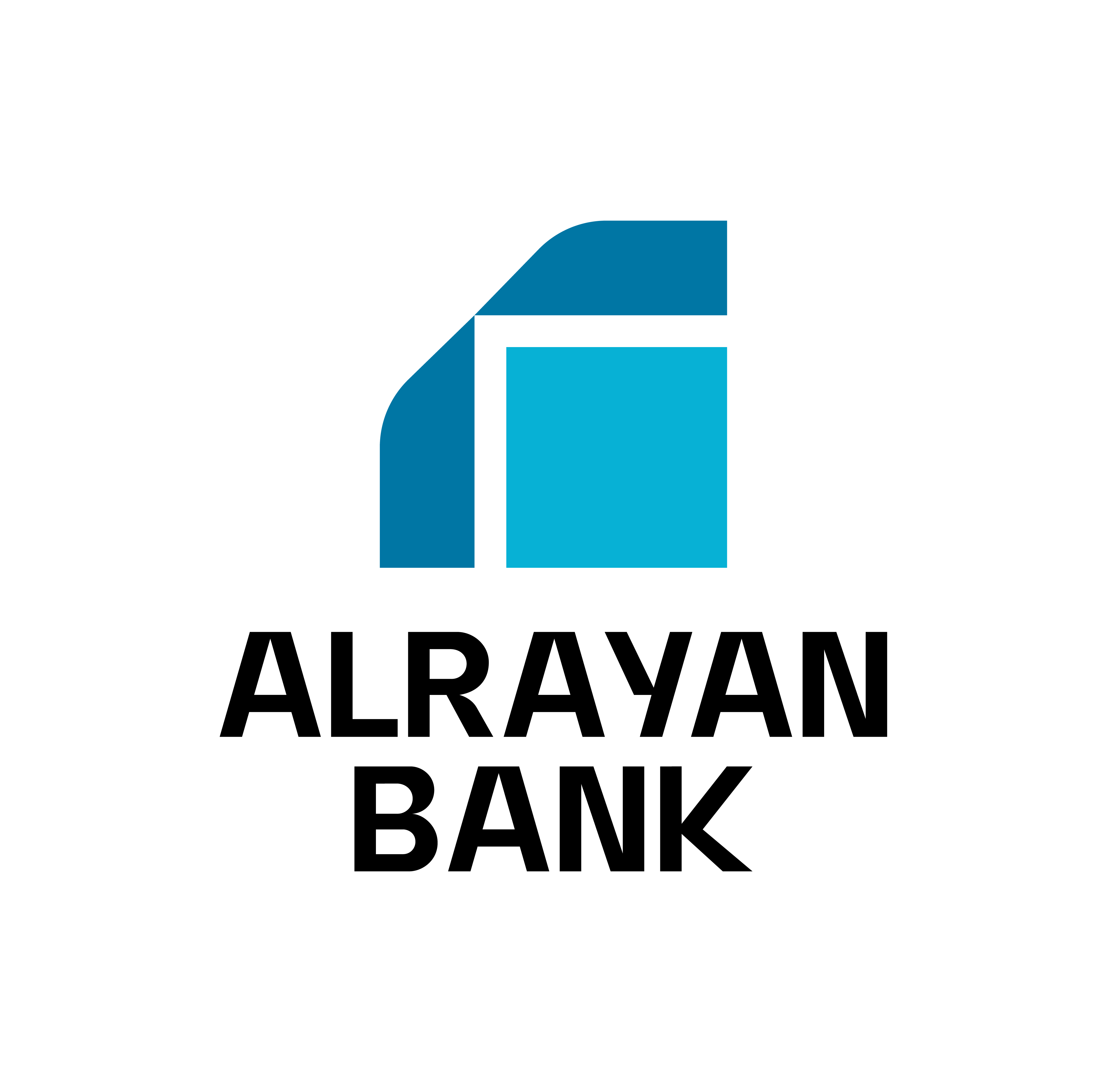
- Formerly: Islamic House of Britain PLC (2002–2004); Islamic Bank of Britain PLC (2004–2014)
- Type: Public
- Traded as: QE: MARK
- Industry: Financial services
- Founded: 2004
- Headquarters: London, UK
- Key people: Giles Cunningham (CEO)
- Products: Banking
- Net income: ▲GBP30.61 million (2023 pre-tax)
- Number of employees: Circa 200 (2022)
- Parent: Masraf Al Rayan
- Website: alrayanbank.co.uk

Al Rayan Bank PLC (مصرف الريان formerly known as Islamic Bank of Britain) is a commercial bank in the United Kingdom, established in August 2004 to offer Sharia compliant financial service products to customers of any faith. The Bank serves its Premier and Commercial customers through Relationship Managers based in London. Retail customers are served through the Bank's Digital Banking and Telephone Banking services.

The bank welcomes people of all faiths and has become popular with many non-Muslims looking for an ethical alternative to conventional banks.

The bank has a Sharia department and an independent Sharia Supervisory Committee to ensure that its products are compliant with the principles of Islamic finance.

As of 2020, Al Rayan Bank served 80,000 customers.

== History ==
Islamic Bank of Britain was formed by a group of investors from the Middle East to take advantage of the growing market for Sharia compliant financial services in the UK. In July 2002, consultants and advisors were employed to confirm if such type of bank was needed and if it would be accepted by the Financial Services Authority, FSA.

Potential investors were invited, mainly from the Persian Gulf, who put together a private placement document which allowed the company to raise £14 million in start up capital by early 2003. In the same period, its first managing director, Michael Hanlon was recruited. Later that year, a draft business plan was proposed and formal application to the FSA was submitted.

By August 2004, the FSA granted authorisation of the bank, and subsequently led to the Islamic Bank of Britain becoming available to the public.

Giles Cunningham is the current CEO of Al Rayan Bank; he joined the Bank in April 2021.

In 2022, the Bank acquired a new headquarters in London's West End, 4 Stratford Place. The Grade II listed mansion houses the Bank's Board, Executive, Commercial and Premier Banking divisions.

== Macroeconomic conditions ==
Like all financial institutions, the Bank was adversely affected firstly by the 2008 financial crisis and the Great Recession. Despite, this IBB continued to grow and in 2012 attained the highest level of retail asset finance and deposit balances in its history.

== The acquisition of Islamic Bank of Britain by Masraf Al Rayan ==
On 16 January 2014, IBB confirmed that its new parent company was Masraf Al Rayan, one of the largest Islamic banks in the world.

In December 2014, Islamic Bank of Britain officially changed its name to Al Rayan Bank PLC, to reflect its status as part of the Masraf Al Rayan (MAR) group of companies.

== Rapid growth ==
In 2016, the Al Rayan Bank was named as the third fastest growing bank in the UK by 'Bank League Tables 2017', a complete financial analysis of all 155 UK incorporated banks, published by Searchline Publishing. Commercial property finance increased by 44% to £396.5m in 2016 becoming the fastest growing element of Al Rayan Bank's property portfolio. This was followed in 2017 by the Bank posting record pre-tax profits of £8.2m and announcing that it had over 77,000 customers.

Al Rayan Bank became the only UK Islamic bank to receive an official rating when global credit agency Moody's assigned a Aa3 deposit rating to Al Rayan Bank in November 2017. Later that month the Bank's previous CEO, Sultan Choudhury was appointed an OBE for his services to Islamic finance by His Royal Highness Prince William, Duke of Cambridge.

== New strategy ==
In 2022 the Bank announced that it intended to become a financial institution which is focused on premier banking and property, mainly high value residential investments, to deliver a viable, resilient, Sharia compliant business. Al Rayan Bank said its existing retail banking business will be maintained, but will not be the primary focus in the future.

This change of strategy was one of the reasons behind the Bank posting record profits for 2022.
