= Banana Island (Qatar) =

Island in Qatar

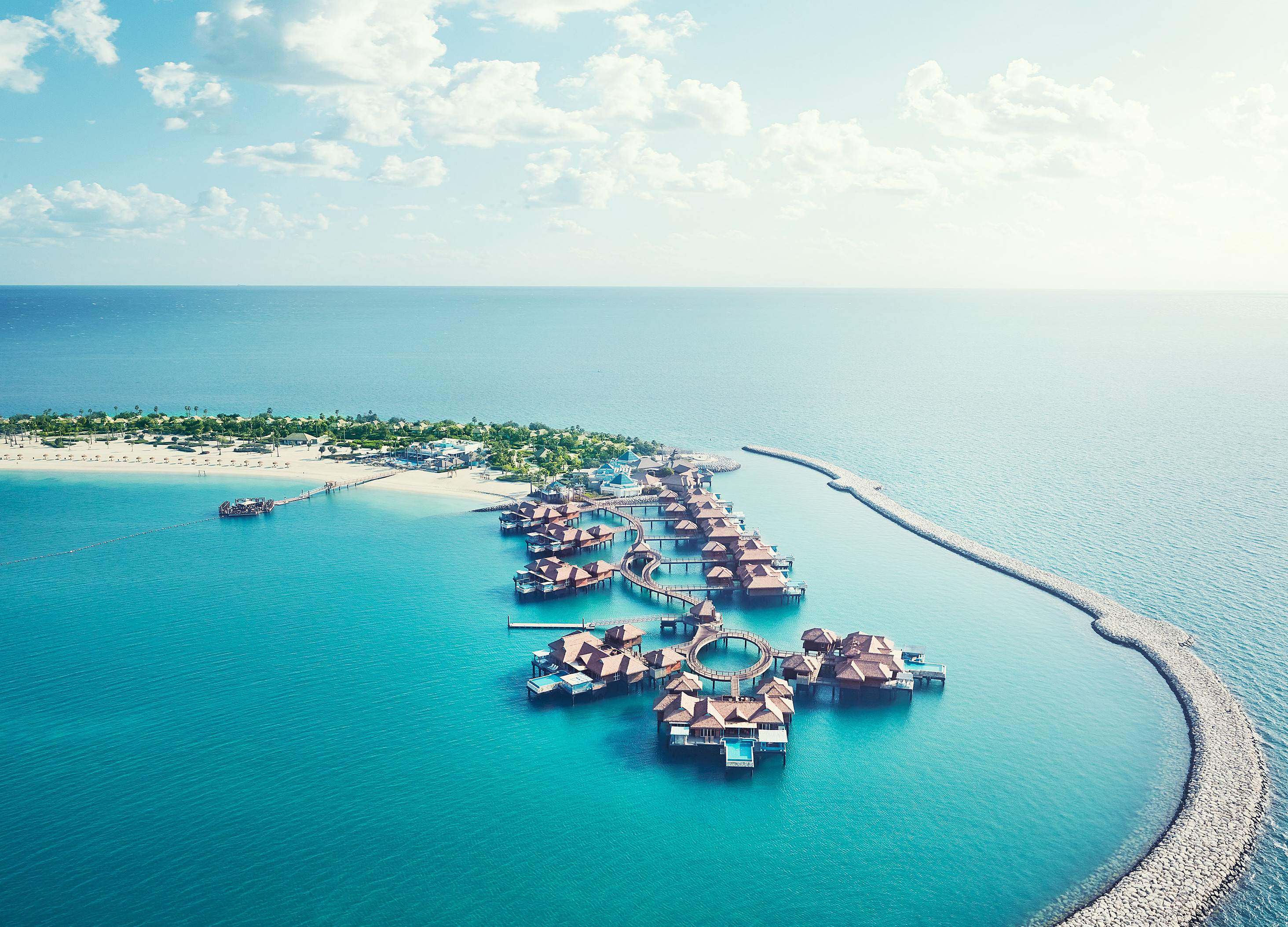
Over Water Villas at Banana Island Resort Doha by Anantara

Banana Island (Arabic: جزيرة الموز) is a small island in Qatar constructed by Power International Holding. Its territory is crescent-shaped and is located off the coast of the capital city of Doha. It is an artificial island in the Persian Gulf. Banana Island Resort Doha, operated by Thailand-based by Anantara, was built there. The island covers 20 hectares (0.20 km^{2}; 49 acres) and has its own marina and reefs. The entire structure was completed by 2015.

== See also ==
- List of islands of Qatar
