= Jassem Mohammed Omar =

Qatari footballer (born 1995)

Jassem Omar
Personal information
- Full name: Jassem Mohammed Abdulaziz Omar
- Date of birth: 18 April 1995 (age 31)
- Place of birth: Qatar
- Height: 1.72 m (5 ft 7 1/2 in)
- Positions: Defender; right back

Team information
- Current team: Al Ahli
- Number: 18

Youth career
- 2009-2014: Aspire
- 2014: → Red Bull Salzburg (loan)

Senior career*
Years	Team	Apps	(Gls)
2014–2015	SPG FC Pasching/LASK Juniors	3	(0)
2015–2016	Linz		
2016–2020	Al Ahli	49	(0)
2020–2021	Al-Duhail	0	(0)
2020–2021	→ Al Ahli (loan)	19	(0)
2021–	Al Ahli	53	(0)

International career
- Qatar U20
- * Club domestic league appearances and goals as of 17 January 2026

Jassem Omar (Arabic:جاسم محمد عمر) (born 18 April 1995) is a Qatari footballer who currently plays for Al Ahli.
