= David Prats =

Spanish footballer

Personal information
- Full name: David Prats Racero
- Date of birth: 3 April 1979 (age 47)
- Place of birth: Badalona, Spain
- Height: 1.73 m (5 ft 8 in)
- Position: Forward

Team information
- Current team: Al-Shamal (head coach)

Youth career
- Badalona
- Barcelona

Senior career*
Years	Team	Apps	(Gls)
1997–2000	Barcelona C	74	(50)
1999–2000	→ Bregenz (loan)	9	(0)
2000-2001	Terrassa	31	(4)
2001–2002	Mataró	36	(23)
2002–2005	Poli Ejido	66	(11)
2005	Girona	21	(5)
2005–2011	Badalona	206	(73)
2011–2012	Hospitalet	36	(14)
2012–2013	Sant Andreu	18	(2)
2013–2014	Vilassar Mar		

Managerial career
- 2017–2018: Sant Andreu (youth)
- 2018–2021: Al Sadd (reserves)
- 2024-: Al-Shamal
- * Club domestic league appearances and goals

David Prats Racero (born 3 April 1979) is a Spanish football coach and former player who played as a forward. currently head coach of Qatar Stars League club Al-Shamal.
