= Baladna (company) =

Qatari agricultural company

Baladna Food Industries
- Type: Listed company
- Industry: Food Industry
- Headquarters: Al Khor, Qatar
- Number of locations: Al Thakhira
- Key people: Moutaz Al-Khayyat (chairman)
- Revenue: QAR 1,145,227,183 (2024)
- Net income: QAR 185,012,156 (2024)
- Website: www.baladna.com

Baladna is a Qatari agricultural company that raises livestock and produces dairy products. It is Qatar's largest locally owned food and dairy producer, supplying over 85% of the country's fresh dairy products.

Baladna was co-founded by Syrian-Qatari businessman Moutaz Al-Khayyat and Ramez Al-Khayyat, and is part of Power International Holding. The farms and dairy factories are managed by CEO Malcolm Jordan.

== History ==
The company was founded as a sheep and goat farm. In May 2017, it began producing processed dairy products for the Qatari market.

In the wake of the June 2017 suspension of diplomatic ties by several Gulf countries with Qatar, Baladna, with state support, rapidly expanded into producing cow's milk, which was previously supplied to Qatar primarily by Saudi Arabia. The company purchased 3,400 cows, and began milking them in July at a farm in Umm al Hawaya. Baladna planned to continue expanding its herd.

The farm is now home to 22,000 cows, with a potential current capacity of 24,000. The cows are fed hay imported from Asia, Europe and Africa. Baladna's current facilities cover 2 million square metres and are spread across two farms that house 40 barns with state-of-the-art milking parlours. Baladna has a current capacity to manufacture 700,000 to 900,000 litres of beverages per day. About 80% of the farm's output meets domestic Qatari demand, with the remainder exported. Baladna's main goal is to reach self-sufficiency of dairy production in Qatar. After reaching self-sufficiency, the company began exporting its dairy products and producing juice products.

On 17 October 2019, Baladna announced its intention to float on the Qatar Exchange. By the end of October, Baladna launched an initial public offering that is expected to raise 1.426 billion riyals ($392 million). The stocks were offered only to Qatari individuals and companies at first. However, foreigners will be able to own up to 49% of shares in the future.

In June 2019, exactly two years after the diplomatic crisis, Baladna confirmed that it is now supplying half of Qatar's fresh milk. The company also started exporting milk to Afghanistan and Yemen, with plans to extend to Oman and other countries eventually. By early 2021, the company was exporting to eleven countries, including Pakistan and Libya, and targeting annual revenue growth of 15–20% over the following five years.

Baladna launched a budget-conscious brand, Awafi, in 2020 in response to consumer trends in the region. On 6 August 2020, the company announced a 7-month net profit of QR 84 million and revenues of QR 442 million, which they attributed to improved productivity "positively strengthening margin delivery". Speaking to Bloomberg Daybreak about the results, Managing Director Ramez Al-Khayyat said Baladna planned to continue growing its product portfolio and increase its presence and exports outside of Qatar.

In 2021, the company announced its intention to invest in crop farming. In Europe, Baladna will invest in 5,000 hectares of land in Romania to grow 85% of the feed for its herd. The company also intends to grow crops in Qatar for the first time, using centre pivot irrigation to cultivate alfalfa for cattle feed.

Baladna became a founding member of the Children's Museum of Qatar in June 2021.

In 2025, Baladna signed contracts worth more than $500 million to develop a major agri-industrial project in Algeria. Valued at $3.5 billion, the project aims to produce powdered milk to strengthen food security, reduce dependency on imports, and bolster the Algerian economy.

== Strategic development ==
Baladna has established itself as a key player in Qatar's food security strategy, with government and semi-government entities holding 27% of shares. The company implemented several sustainability initiatives, including a water treatment facility that reduced consumption by 50% and a waste management system that converts animal waste to compost, cutting carbon emissions by 30,000 tonnes annually. Operating through both premium (Baladna) and value (Awafi) brands, the company maintained a strong market presence despite challenges from the COVID-19 pandemic.
