= Qatar Stock Exchange =

Qatari stock market index

- Type: Stock exchange
- Location: Doha, Qatar
- Founded: 1995
- Key people: Sh. Mohammed Al Thani (Chairman)
- Currency: Qatari Riyal
- Website: qe.com.qa

The Qatar Stock Exchange is the principal stock market of Qatar. QSE is a full member of the World Federation of Exchanges and was recently upgraded by the MSCI and the S&P Dow Jones Indices.

== History ==
Established in 1995, the Doha Securities Market (DSM) officially started operations in 1997. Since then, the exchange has grown to become one of the leading stock markets in the GCC region.

In June 2009, Qatar Holding, the strategic and direct investment arm of Qatar Investment Authority (QIA), and NYSE Euronext, the world's leading exchange group, signed an agreement to form a major strategic partnership to establish the Exchange as a world-class financial market. The DSM was renamed the Qatar Stock Exchange on the conclusion of the deal.

The primary aim of the Qatar Stock Exchange is to support Qatar's economy by providing a venue for capital raising for Qatari companies as part of their corporate strategy and giving investors a platform through which they can trade a variety of products in a transparent and efficient manner. The Qatar Stock Exchange also provides the public with access to market information and ensures correct disclosure of information.
