= 2022–23 Qatar Stars League =

National football league season

Qatar Stars League
- Season: 2022–23
- Dates: 1 August 2022 – 28 April 2023
- Champions: Al-Duhail
- Relegated: Al-Sailiya
- Matches: 132
- Goals: 369 (2.8 per match)
- Top goalscorer: Michael Olunga (22 goals)
- Biggest home win: Qatar SC 5–0 Al-Gharafa (11 January 2023); Al-Wakrah 5–0 Al-Sailiya (24 January 2023)
- Biggest away win: Al-Shamal 0–5 Al-Sailiya (5 February 2023)
- Highest scoring: Al-Markhiya 4–3 Al-Sadd (1 August 2022); Al-Wakrah 5–2 Al-Ahli (18 March 2023); Al-Arabi 4–3 Al-Ahli (13 April 2023); Al-Rayyan 3–4 Al-Duhail (18 April 2023)
- Longest winning run: 7 matches Al-Duhail
- Longest unbeaten run: 16 matches Al-Duhail
- Longest winless run: 11 matches Umm Salal
- Longest losing run: 5 matches Al-Shamal
- All statistics correct as of 29 April 2023.

The 2022–23 Stars League, or the QSL, also called QNB Stars League for sponsorship reasons, is scheduled to be the 50th edition of top-level football championship in Qatar. The league will kick off on August 1, 2022, and is expected to end in March 2023. Al-Sadd are the defending champion.

This season had an extended break due to 2022 FIFA World Cup being held in Qatar.

== Teams ==
Locations of the 2022–23 Qatar Stars League teams
Doha Qatar Stars League football clubs

=== Stadia and locations ===
In August and September clubs played their matches in the 2022 FIFA World Cup venues. Beside that, some clubs play in multiple stadiums throughout the season.

Club	City/Town	Stadium	Capacity
Al-Ahli	Doha	Hamad bin Khalifa Stadium	12,000
Al-Arabi	Doha	Grand Hamad Stadium	12,000
Al-Duhail	Doha	Abdullah bin Khalifa Stadium	10,000
Al-Gharafa	Doha	Thani bin Jassim Stadium	21,872
Al-Markhiya	Doha	various	
Al-Rayyan	Doha (Note: Team is registered in Al Rayyan.)	various	
Al-Sadd	Doha	Jassim bin Hamad Stadium	13,030
Al-Sailiya	Doha	Hamad bin Khalifa Stadium	12,000
Al-Shamal	Doha (Note: Team is registered in Al Shamal.)	various	
Al-Wakrah	Al Wakrah	Saoud bin Abdulrahman Stadium	12,000
Qatar SC	Doha	various	
Umm Salal	Doha	various	

=== Personnel and kits ===
Club	Coach	Captain	Kit manufacturer	Shirt sponsor
Al-Ahli	(Montenegro) Nebojša Jovović	(Qatar) Ali Qadry	Nike	Regency Group Holding
Al-Arabi	(Qatar) Younes Ali	(Qatar) Ahmed Fatehi	Puma	Doha Bank; Sharq Insurance; Snoonu
Al-Duhail	(Argentina) Hernán Crespo	(Qatar) Almoez Ali	Puma	Al Rayan Bank
Al-Gharafa	(Portugal) Pedro Martins	(Qatar) Qasem Burhan	Erreà	N/A
Al-Markhiya	(Qatar) Abdullah Mubarak	(Qatar) Talal Al-Shila	Joma	N/A
Al-Rayyan	(Chile) Nicolás Córdova	(Qatar) Dame Traore	Kelme	Baladna; Mall of Qatar
Al-Sadd	(Spain) Juan Manuel Lillo	(Qatar) Hassan Al-Haydos	New Balance	Qatar Airways
Al-Sailiya	(Tunisia) Sami Trabelsi	(Qatar) Majdi Siddiq	Zat Outfit	N/A
Al-Shamal	(Morocco) Hicham Jadrane	(Jordan) Baha' Faisal	Zat Outfit	N/A
Al-Wakrah	(Spain) Tintín Márquez	(Qatar) Ahmed Fadhel	Puma	N/A
Qatar SC	(Morocco) Youssef Safri	(Qatar) Sebastián Soria	Erreà	N/A
Umm Salal	(Qatar) Wesam Rizik	(Ivory Coast) Jonathan Kodjia	Jako	N/A

== League table ==
Pos	Team	Pld	W	D	L	GF	GA	GD	Pts	Qualification or relegation
1	Al-Duhail (C)	22	16	3	3	50	26	+24	51	Qualification for AFC Champions League group stage
2	Al-Arabi	22	16	1	5	43	23	+20	49	Qualification for AFC Champions League play-off round
3	Al-Sadd (Note: Qualified as 2021-22 champions.)	22	14	2	6	46	26	+20	44	Qualification for AFC Champions League group stage
4	Al-Wakrah	22	11	6	5	44	24	+20	39	Qualification for AFC Champions League play-off round
5	Qatar SC	22	11	3	8	28	30	−2	36	
6	Al-Gharafa	22	9	5	8	32	38	−6	32	
7	Al-Markhiya	22	7	3	12	30	37	−7	24	
8	Al-Ahli	22	6	6	10	32	45	−13	24	
9	Al-Rayyan	22	5	5	12	29	33	−4	20	
10	Umm Salal	22	3	9	10	18	34	−16	18	
11	Al-Shamal (O)	22	5	3	14	22	41	−19	18	Qualification for Relegation play-off
12	Al-Sailiya (R)	22	4	4	14	28	45	−17	16	Relegation to Qatargas League

Updated to match(es) played on 8 May 2023. Source: QSL, Soccerway
Rules for classification: 1) Points; 2) Goal difference; 3) Number of goals scored;
(C) Champions; (O) Relegation play-off winner; (R) Relegated

== Results ==
Home \ Away	AHL	ARA	DUH	GHA	MAR	RAY	SAD	SAI	SHA	WAK	QAT	UMM
Al-Ahli	—	1–2	1–1	3–3	1–0	0–4	2–1	0–4	0–1	2–2	1–3	3–1
Al-Arabi	4–3	—	0–3	3–0	2–0	2–1	0–2	4–1	1–0	1–2	2–0	2–0
Al-Duhail	2–1	3–1	—	3–0	3–1	2–1	1–3	1–1	5–2	2–4	3–0	3–1
Al-Gharafa	1–1	0–1	2–0	—	2–1	2–2	1–3	2–1	3–2	1–1	0–1	2–2
Al-Markhiya	2–2	0–2	0–1	0–1	—	2–3	4–3	1–3	2–1	0–4	4–0	2–3
Al-Rayyan	1–2	0–3	3–4	4–1	1–2	—	1–2	2–0	0–1	1–1	0–1	1–1
Al-Sadd	3–2	1–2	2–2	1–2	1–0	2–0	—	4–0	1–2	4–2	2–0	2–0
Al-Sailiya	1–2	1–5	1–3	1–2	1–3	2–2	1–2	—	2–1	0–1	1–2	1–1
Al-Shamal	2–2	0–1	0–2	2–1	1–3	1–2	1–3	0–5	—	0–0	3–0	0–1
Al-Wakrah	5–2	1–2	0–1	0–4	0–0	1–0	2–1	5–0	5–1	—	1–2	4–0
Qatar SC	2–0	3–2	1–3	5–0	1–1	1–0	0–2	1–1	1–0	0–3	—	4–1
Umm Salal	0–1	1–1	1–2	1–2	1–2	0–0	1–1	1–0	1–1	0–0	0–0	—

Updated to match(es) played on 29 April 2023. Source: Flashscore
Legend: Blue = home team win; Yellow = draw; Red = away team win.

== Relegation play-off ==
14 May 2023
21:30 UTC+3

Al-Shamal	2–1	Al Khor

Jassim Bin Hamad Stadium

== Season statistics ==
=== Top scorers ===
As of 8 May 2023

Rank	Player	Team	Goals
1	(Kenya) Michael Olunga	Al-Duhail	22
2	(Syria) Omar Al Somah	Al-Arabi	19
3	(Angola) Gelson Dala	Al-Wakrah	15
4	(Tunisia) Youssef Msakni	Al-Arabi	13
4	(Ivory Coast) Yohan Boli	Al-Rayyan	13
7	(Algeria) Baghdad Bounedjah	Al-Sadd	12
8	(Sweden) Carlos Strandberg	Al-Sailiya	11
9	(Qatar) Akram Afif	Al-Sadd	10
9	(Morocco) Driss Fettouhi	Al-Markhiya	9
9	(Algeria) Mohamed Benyettou	Al-Wakrah	9
9	(Iran) Mehrdad Mohammadi	Al-Sailiya	9
12	(Jordan) Yazan Al-Naimat	Al-Ahli	8

=== Hat-tricks ===
Player	For	Against	Score	Date
(Democratic Republic of the Congo) Ben Malango	Qatar SC	Al-Gharafa	5-0	11 January 2023
(Kenya) Michael Olunga^{4}	Al–Duhail	Al-Shamal	2–5	8 May 2023

== Attendances ==
#	Football club	Average attendance
1	Al-Gharafa SC	1,147
2	Al-Sadd SC	1,044
3	Al-Wakrah SC	980
4	Umm-Salal SC	844
5	Al-Duhail SC	794
6	Al-Rayyan SC	730
7	Al-Arabi SC	728
8	Al-Ahli SC	680
9	Qatar SC	368
10	Al-Shamal SC	354
11	Al-Sailiya SC	168
12	Al-Markhiya SC	164
