= 2023–24 Qatar Stars League =

National football league season

Qatar Stars League
- Season: 2023–24
- Champions: Al Sadd (17th title)
- Relegated: Al-Markhiya; Muaither
- Champions League Elite: Al Sadd; Al-Rayyan; Al-Gharafa
- Champions League Two: Al-Wakrah
- AGCFF Gulf Club Champions League: Al-Arabi
- Matches: 132
- Goals: 482 (3.65 per match)
- Top goalscorer: Akram Afif (26 goals)
- Biggest home win: Al-Rayyan 6–0 Al-Markhiya (20 December 2023); Al Sadd 6–0 Umm Salal (21 December 2023)
- Biggest away win: Al Ahli 1–9 Al Sadd (17 April 2024)
- Highest scoring: Al Ahli 1–9 Al Sadd (17 April 2024)
- Longest winning run: 7 matches Al Sadd
- Longest unbeaten run: 10 matches Al Sadd
- Longest winless run: 9 matches Al-Duhail; Muaither
- Longest losing run: 5 matches Al-Markhiya
- All statistics correct as of 28 April 2024.

The 2023–24 Qatar Stars League, or the QSL, also called Expo Stars League for sponsorship reasons, was the 51st edition of top-level football championship in Qatar.

Al-Duhail were the defending champions.

== Teams ==
Locations of the 2022–23 Qatar Stars League teams
Doha Qatar Stars League football clubs

=== Stadia and locations ===
Club	City/Town	Stadium	Capacity
Al Ahli	Doha	Hamad bin Khalifa Stadium	12,000
Al-Arabi	Doha	Grand Hamad Stadium	12,000
Al-Duhail	Doha	Abdullah bin Khalifa Stadium	10,000
Al-Gharafa	Doha	Thani bin Jassim Stadium	21,872
Al-Markhiya	Doha	Al-Markhiya Stadium	200
Al-Rayyan	Al Rayyan	Ahmad bin Ali Stadium	47,343
Al Sadd	Doha	Jassim Bin Hamad Stadium	13,030
Al-Shamal	Al Shamal	Al-Shamal SC Stadium	5,000
Al-Wakrah	Al Wakrah	Saoud bin Abdulrahman Stadium	12,000
Muaither	Doha	Thani bin Jassim Stadium	21,872
Qatar SC	Doha	Suheim Bin Hamad Stadium	12,000
Umm Salal	Doha	Thani bin Jassim Stadium	21,872

=== Personnel and kits ===
Club	Coach	Captain	Kit manufacturer	Shirt sponsor
Al Ahli	(Portugal) Pepa	(Qatar) Yazan Naim	Adidas	Regency Group Holding
Al-Arabi	(Qatar) Younes Ali	(Qatar) Abdullah Marafee	Adidas	Doha Bank; Sharq Insurance; Snoonu
Al-Duhail	(France) Christophe Galtier	(Qatar) Almoez Ali	Puma	Al Rayan Bank
Al-Gharafa	(Portugal) Pedro Martins	(Algeria) Yacine Brahimi	Erreà	N/A
Al-Markhiya	(Algeria) Madjid Bougherra	(Qatar) Talal Al-Shila	Joma	N/A
Al-Rayyan	(Portugal) Leonardo Jardim	(Qatar) Abdulaziz Hatem	Nike	Baladna; Mall of Qatar
Al Sadd	(Qatar) Wesam Rizik	(Qatar) Hassan Al-Haydos	New Balance	Qatar Airways
Al-Shamal	(Sweden) Poya Asbaghi	(Argentina) Matías Nani	Zat Outfit	N/A
Al-Wakrah	(Spain) José Murcia	(Qatar) Ahmed Fadhel	Puma	N/A
Muaither	(Uruguay) Jorge da Silva	(Qatar) Saif Al-Mohannadi	Jako	N/A
Qatar SC	(Portugal) Hélio Sousa	(Iraq) Bashar Resan	Erreà	N/A
Umm Salal	(France) Patrice Carteron	(Algeria) Andy Delort	Puma	N/A

== League table ==
Pos	Team	Pld	W	D	L	GF	GA	GD	Pts	Qualification or relegation
1	Al-Sadd (C)	22	15	4	3	65	21	+44	49	Qualification for the AFC Champions League Elite League stage
2	Al-Rayyan	22	15	2	5	50	26	+24	47	Qualification for the AFC Champions League Elite League stage
3	Al-Gharafa	22	13	5	4	53	36	+17	44	Qualification for the AFC Champions League Elite play-off round
4	Al-Wakrah	22	11	5	6	40	30	+10	38	Qualification for the AFC Champions League Two group stage
5	Al-Arabi	22	7	8	7	42	38	+4	29	Qualification for the AGCFF Gulf Club Champions League group stage
6	Al-Duhail	22	8	4	10	42	45	−3	28	
7	Umm Salal	22	7	7	8	32	37	−5	28	
8	Qatar SC	22	7	4	11	39	47	−8	25	
9	Al-Shamal	22	6	7	9	28	37	−9	25	
10	Al-Ahli	22	7	2	13	37	58	−21	23	
11	Al-Markhiya (R)	22	5	3	14	20	50	−30	18	Qualification for Relegation play-off
12	Muaither (R)	22	3	5	14	34	57	−23	14	Relegation to Qatari Second Division

Source: QSL, Soccerway
Rules for classification: 1) Points; 2) Goal difference; 3) Number of goals scored;
(C) Champions; (R) Relegated

== Results ==
Home \ Away	AHL	ARA	DUH	GHA	MAR	RAY	SAD	SHA	WAK	MUA	QAT	UMM
Al-Ahli	—	1–1	1–2	1–4	1–4	0–4	1–9	1–2	1–0	4–2	2–4	1–2
Al-Arabi	2–3	—	3–3	0–1	1–2	2–3	2–2	1–1	2–1	4–3	1–0	1–1
Al-Duhail	3–5	2–2	—	1–4	0–0	3–2	3–1	3–1	2–3	4–1	1–1	0–1
Al-Gharafa	1–2	5–4	3–2	—	2–0	3–0	2–2	1–1	1–1	5–2	2–1	1–1
Al-Markhiya	0–2	0–4	1–2	3–2	—	0–1	1–2	2–1	0–3	0–2	1–2	1–1
Al-Rayyan	4–1	1–0	2–0	3–4	6–0	—	4–0	2–1	3–0	1–0	1–0	2–2
Al-Sadd	4–2	0–1	3–1	4–0	5–0	4–0	—	4–0	0–0	4–2	3–0	6–0
Al-Shamal	2–1	0–0	1–2	1–0	2–0	3–4	0–4	—	0–0	0–0	1–2	1–3
Al-Wakrah	3–2	2–4	2–1	2–4	1–2	3–2	0–0	2–2	—	3–0	1–0	2–1
Muaither	1–1	2–2	2–5	0–2	5–2	0–0	0–2	2–2	2–4	—	3–5	1–3
Qatar SC	1–3	3–4	4–2	4–4	4–0	0–3	1–3	0–2	1–5	3–2	—	1–1
Umm Salal	3–1	2–1	2–0	1–2	1–1	0–2	1–3	3–4	0–2	1–2	2–2	—

Source: Flashscore
Legend: Blue = home team win; Yellow = draw; Red = away team win.

== Relegation play-off ==
5 May 2024
21:30 UTC+3

Al-Markhiya	1–3	Al Shahaniya

Al Thumama Stadium

== Season statistics ==
=== Top scorers ===
As of 28 April 2024 (Flashscore)

Rank	Player	Team	Goals
1	(Qatar) Akram Afif	Al-Sadd	26
2	(Algeria) Yacine Brahimi	Al-Gharafa	21
3	(Brazil) Róger Guedes	Al-Rayyan	19
4	(Syria) Omar Al Somah	Al-Arabi	17
5	(Algeria) Mohamed Benyettou	Al-Wakrah	16
6	(Kenya) Michael Olunga	Al-Duhail	15
7	(Ivory Coast) Yohan Boli	Qatar SC	13
8	(Cape Verde) Ricardo Gomes	Al-Shamal	12
9	(Tunisia) Naim Sliti	Al-Ahli	10
9	(Morocco) Achraf Bencharki	Al-Rayyan	10

== Team of the Year ==
No	Position	Nat.	Player	Club	Ref.
1	Goalkeeper	(Qatar)	Meshaal Barsham	Al-Sadd	
2	Defender	(Brazil)	Paulo Otávio	Al-Sadd	
3	Defender	(Brazil)	Lucas Mendes	Al-Wakrah	
4	Defender	(Brazil)	Lyanco	Al-Gharafa	
5	Defender	(Qatar)	Bassam Al-Rawi	Al-Sadd	
6	Midfielder	(Egypt)	Hamdy Fathy	Al-Wakrah	
7	Midfielder	(Tunisia)	Ferjani Sassi	Al-Gharafa	
8	Midfielder	(Italy)	Marco Verratti	Al-Arabi	
9	Forward	(Algeria)	Yacine Brahimi	Al-Gharafa	
10	Forward	(Brazil)	Róger Guedes	Al-Rayyan	
11	Forward	(Qatar)	Akram Afif	Al-Sadd	
