= Mohammed Arafah =

Egyptian footballer (born 1991)

Personal information
- Full name: Mohammed Arafah Mesaad
- Date of birth: 3 March 1991 (age 35)
- Place of birth: Egypt
- Position: Defender

Senior career*
Years	Team	Apps	(Gls)
2012–2019	Al-Wakrah	59	(0)
2019–2022	Al-Markhiya		
2022–2023	Al-Khor		
- * Club domestic league appearances and goals

Mohammed Arafah (Arabic:محمد عرفه) (born 3 March 1991) is an Egyptian footballer. He currently plays as a defender.
