= Yohan Boli =

Ivorian footballer (born 1993)

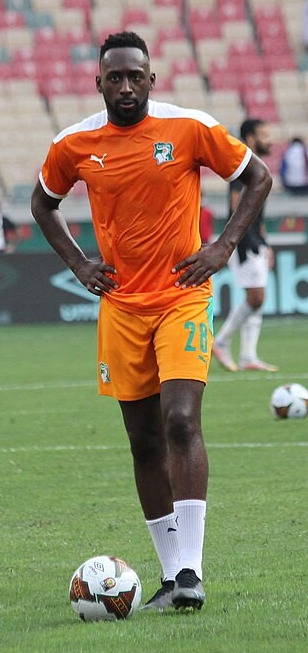
- Boli with the Ivory Coast in 2022

Personal information
- Full name: Yohan Alexandre Mady Boli
- Date of birth: 17 November 1993 (age 32)
- Place of birth: Arras, France
- Height: 1.81 m (5 ft 11 in)
- Position: Forward

Team information
- Current team: Qatar
- Number: 11

Senior career*
Years	Team	Apps	(Gls)
2010–2011	CS Avion	1	(0)
2012–2013	Sedan Ardennes B	24	(9)
2013–2014	Roeselare	21	(3)
2014–2015	Verviétois	21	(23)
2015–2020	Sint-Truiden	120	(39)
2020–2023	Al-Rayyan	68	(36)
2023–2025	Al-Gharafa	12	(6)
2024	→ Qatar (loan)	10	(7)
2024–2025	→ Al-Khor (loan)	11	(1)
2025–2026	Antalyaspor	24	(2)
2026–	Qatar	2	(0)

International career
2017–2022	Ivory Coast	8	(0)
- * Club domestic league appearances and goals as of 17 October 2026

Yohan Alexandre Mady Boli (born 17 November 1993) is a professional footballer who plays as a forward for Qatar Stars League club Qatar. Born in France, he has represented Ivory Coast internationally.

== Club career ==
After progressing through the reserve teams of French clubs CS Avion and Sedan Ardennes, Boli joined Belgian club Roeselare in 2013. He moved to RCS Verviétois the following year, attracting attention after scoring 23 goals in 21 league appearances during the 2014–15 season. After joining Sint-Truiden in 2015, he continued to perform consistently in the Belgian Pro League, scoring 12 goals in the 2018–19 season and a further 10 goals in 17 league appearances during the first half of the 2019–20 season. His performances earned him a move to Qatar Stars League club Al-Rayyan SC in January 2020.

At Al-Rayyan, Boli established himself as the team's first-choice striker. He scored 11 league goals in the 2020–21 season and 13 in the 2022–23 season. After making 68 league appearances and scoring 36 goals over three seasons with Al-Rayyan, he departed the club in May 2023.

In July 2023, Boli signed for Al-Gharafa SC. After scoring six goals in 12 league appearances during the first half of the 2023–24 season, he joined Qatar SC on loan in January 2024, scoring seven goals in 10 league appearances during the second half of the season. In the 2024–25 season, he was loaned to Al-Khor SC, where he scored once in 11 league appearances. He returned to Al-Gharafa in January 2025.

In September 2025, Boli moved to Turkish club Antalyaspor. After playing in the Süper Lig during the 2025–26 season, he parted ways with the club in September 2026 and rejoined Qatar SC. The Qatari club signed Boli to fill the gap left by an injury to Brazilian forward Bruno Tabata.

== International career ==
Boli began his international career with the Ivory Coast national team in September 2017, appearing in both matches against Gabon during the 2018 FIFA World Cup African qualifiers. In 2019, he featured in friendly matches against Comoros, Benin and Tunisia. In November of the same year, he played in the 2021 Africa Cup of Nations qualifiers against Niger and Ethiopia.

Boli made two further appearances in the Africa Cup of Nations qualifiers in March 2021 and featured against Mozambique in the 2022 FIFA World Cup African qualifiers in November of that year. In January 2022, he was included in Ivory Coast's squad for the 2021 Africa Cup of Nations, held in Cameroon, but did not make an appearance in the tournament. Ivory Coast were eliminated in the round of 16 after drawing 0–0 with Egypt and losing in the penalty shoot-out.

Boli made his final international appearance in a friendly against the England in March 2022 and has not played for Ivory Coast since.

== Personal life ==
Boli is the son of the Ivorian former footballer Roger Boli, nephew of French international footballer Basile Boli, and cousin of Ivorian footballer Yannick Boli. Boli's brothers, Kévin Boli and Charles Boli are also professional footballers.

== Career statistics ==
As of match played 8 November 2025

Appearances and goals by club, season and competition
Club	Season	League			National cup (Note: Includes Belgian Cup, Qatari Stars Cup)		League cup (Note: Includes Qatar Cup)		Continental		Other		Total	
Club	Season	Division	Apps	Goals	Apps	Goals	Apps	Goals	Apps	Goals	Apps	Goals	Apps	Goals
Avion	2010–11	CFA	1	0	0	0	—		—		—		1	0
Sedan II	2012–13	Championnat National 3	24	9	0	0	—		—		—		24	9
Roeselare	2013–14	Belgian Second Division	21	3	1	0	—		—		—		22	3
Verviétois	2014–15	Belgian Third Division	21	23	0	0	—		—		—		21	23
Sint-Truiden	2015–16	Belgian Pro League	16	5	—		—		—		—		16	5
Sint-Truiden	2016–17	Belgian Pro League	24	6	3	1	—		—		—		27	7
Sint-Truiden	2017–18	Belgian Pro League	29	6	2	0	—		—		—		31	6
Sint-Truiden	2018–19	Belgian Pro League	34	12	2	2	—		—		—		36	14
Sint-Truiden	2019–20	Belgian Pro League	17	10	1	1	—		—		—		18	11
Sint-Truiden	Total		120	39	8	4	—		—		—		128	43
Al Rayyan	2019–20	Qatar Stars League	7	4	—		—		—		—		7	4
Al Rayyan	2020–21	Qatar Stars League	22	11	5	3	1	0	6 (Note: Appearances in AFC Champions League)	2	4 (Note: Appearances in Emir of Qatar Cup)	3	38	19
Al Rayyan	2021–22	Qatar Stars League	17	8	6	6	0	0	6	4	2	2	31	20
Al Rayyan	2022–23	Qatar Stars League	21	13	0	0	0	0	1	0	1	1	23	14
Al Rayyan	Total		68	36	11	9	1	0	13	6	7	6	99	57
Al-Gharafa	2023–24	Qatar Stars League	12	6	3	3	0	0	—		—		16	9
Qatar (loan)	2023–24	Qatar Stars League	10	7	3	1	0	0	—		—		13	8
Al-Khor (loan)	2024–25	Qatar Stars League	11	1	0	0	5	0	—		—		16	1
Career total			289	124	22	14	6	0	13	6	7	6	340	153
