= Yusupha Njie =

Gambian footballer

Personal information
- Date of birth: 1 March 1994 (age 32)
- Place of birth: Banjul, The Gambia
- Height: 1.88 m (6 ft 2 in)
- Position: Forward

Team information
- Current team: Al-Wakrah (on loan from Al-Markhiya)
- Number: 9

Youth career
- 2002–2004: Wealers FC
- 2004–2011: Cherno Samba Academy

Senior career*
Years	Team	Apps	(Gls)
2011–2013	Real de Banjul		
2013–2018	FUS Rabat	62	(5)
2017–2018	→ Boavista (loan)	17	(4)
2018–2023	Boavista	109	(28)
2023–	Al-Markhiya	28	(7)
2024–2025	→ Santos (loan)	0	(0)
2025	→ Farense (loan)	14	(0)
2026–	→ Al-Wakrah (loan)	0	(0)

International career^{‡}
2007	Gambia U15		
2011	Gambia U17	1	(0)
2017–	Gambia	6	(0)
- * Club domestic league appearances and goals as of 3 June 2025 ‡ National team caps and goals as of 7 May 2023

Yusupha Njie (born 1 March 1994) is a Gambian professional footballer who plays as a forward for Al-Wakrah, on loan from Al-Markhiya and the Gambia national team. He is the son of Biri Biri, who was widely regarded as the greatest Gambian footballer of all time.

== Early years ==
Born in Banjul, Njie began his youth career at local club Wealers FC before switching to Cherno Samba's academy in 2004. In 2007, he was scouted for the national under-15 team; he traveled with them to compete in a cup competition in Norway. Two years later, he underwent a two-week trial with Norwegian club SK Brann, where his half-brother Tijan Jaiteh was playing at the time. Although he impressed team officials, he was not able to return at their request because of obligations with the national under-17 team, including the 2011 African U-17 Championship qualification tournament. He also traveled to Spain for two weeks in 2010 for a trial at his father's former club, Sevilla.

== Club career ==
=== Early career ===
Njie joined first division Gambian side Real de Banjul in 2011 and spent the following two seasons with them, leading them to a league title in 2012. Their win earned them a spot in the 2013 CAF Champions League, where he was instrumental in their 2–1 second-leg victory over Moroccan club FUS Rabat in the preliminary round.

=== FUS Rabat ===
Although Real de Banjul were eliminated on aggregate goals, Njie's play attracted the attention of FUS Rabat manager Jamal Sellami, who signed Njie to a four-year contract after a successful trial with the club in June 2013.

"It was a great feeling to win it and I'm very much thankful right now. I was invited to represent my country and it was my dream to come and play but the time was very tight because we were fighting for the championship which my club had never won so it was history for me."

— Njie after Rabat's title-clinching victory over MC Oujda in June 2016.

After winning the Moroccan Cup with Rabat in 2014, Njie led them to their first-ever league title in 2015–16. That year, he was voted as Rabat's best player and drew further attention from European clubs. He also scored his second and third career CAF Confederation Cup goals that year, but Rabat eventually lost to Algerian club MO Béjaïa in the semi-finals.

Njie scored the game-winning goal in the second leg of a play-off round match-up against Moroccan rivals MAS Fez during 2017 CAF Confederation Cup qualification. After a 2–1 victory in the first match, Njie scored the second goal in a 1–1 draw to ensure a 3–2 aggregate win, sending them to the group stage. In the first group stage match, Rabat defeated the Ugandan domestic champions, KCCA, by a score of 3–0. Njie contributed with a goal and an assist.

=== Boavista ===
In July 2017, Njie joined Portuguese club Boavista FC on a one-year loan, with a buying option in January. He made his debut for the club on 7 August, in a 2–1 away loss to Portimonense SC, and scored his first goal the following 31 January in a 2–1 home win over CS Marítimo.

Boavista activated Njie's buyout clause in June 2018. In July, however, he agreed to move to French club Stade de Reims, but the deal was cancelled due to failed medical tests.

On 22 June 2021, Njie renewed his link with Boavista for two more years.

=== Al-Markhiya ===
On 9 June 2023, Qatari side Al-Markhiya announced the signing of Njie on a two-year deal, after his contract with Boavista had expired. He was the club's top scorer with six goals during the season, as they suffered relegation.

==== Loan to Santos ====
On 2 September 2024, Njie joined Santos on loan until June 2025. He left the club the following January, after failing to make a single appearance.

==== Loan to Farense ====
On 31 January 2025, Njie returned to Portugal after joining Farense on loan.

==== Loan to Al-Wakrah ====
On 4 February 2026, Njie joined Al-Wakrah on loan.

== International career ==
Njie made his senior national debut with Gambia on 11 June 2017 in a 2019 Africa Cup of Nations qualifier, coming on for Hamza Barry during a 1–0 defeat to Benin. He played in the 2021 Africa cup of Nations, his national team's first continental tournament, where they made a sensational quarter-final.

== Personal life ==
In addition to being Biri Biri's son, he is the half-brother of Gambian international footballer Tijan Jaiteh.

== Career statistics ==
=== Club ===
As of 2 September 2024

Appearances and goals by club, season and competition
Club	Season	League			National cup (Note: Includes Taça de Portugal, Emir of Qatar Cup)		League cup (Note: Includes Taça da Liga, Qatari Stars Cup)		Continental		Other		Total	
Club	Season	Division	Apps	Goals	Apps	Goals	Apps	Goals	Apps	Goals	Apps	Goals	Apps	Goals
FUS Rabat	2013–14	Botola	15	1	—		—		—		—		15	1
FUS Rabat	2014–15	Botola	17	1	—		—		—		—		17	1
FUS Rabat	2015–16	Botola	14	3	—		—		—		—		14	3
FUS Rabat	2016–17	Botola	15	0	—		—		9 (Note: Seven appearances and one goal in CAF Confederation Cup, two appearances in CAF Champions League)	1	—		24	1
FUS Rabat	2017–18	Botola	1	0	—		—		5 (Note: Appearance(s) in CAF Confederation Cup)	1	—		6	1
FUS Rabat	Total		62	5	—		—		14	2	—		76	7
Boavista	2017–18	Primeira Liga	17	4	0	0	0	0	—		—		17	4
Boavista	2018–19	Primeira Liga	11	4	0	0	0	0	—		—		11	4
Boavista	2019–20	Primeira Liga	25	1	1	0	1	0	—		—		27	1
Boavista	2020–21	Primeira Liga	21	5	2	1	0	0	—		—		23	6
Boavista	2021–22	Primeira Liga	27	5	1	0	3	2	—		—		31	7
Boavista	2022–23	Primeira Liga	27	13	1	0	4	1	—		—		32	14
Boavista	Total		128	32	5	1	8	3	—		—		141	36
Al-Markhiya	2023–24	Qatar Stars League	21	6	1	0	5	4	—		1 (Note: Appearance(s) in Qatar Stars League relegation play-off)	0	28	10
Santos (loan)	2024	Série B	0	0	—		—		—		—		0	0
Career total			201	43	6	1	13	7	14	2	1	0	235	53

=== International ===
As of 20 August 2024

Gambia
Year	Apps	Goals
2017	1	0
2019	1	0
2021	3	0
2022	1	0
Total	6	0

== Honours ==
Real de Banjul

- GFA League First Division: 2012
- Gambian Super Cup: 2012

FUS Rabat

- Botola: 2015–16
- Coupe du Trône: 2014; runners-up 2015

Santos

- Campeonato Brasileiro Série B: 2024
