= Ali Al-Muhannadi =

Qatari footballer (born 1993)

Personal information
- Full name: Ali Saeed Al-Muhannadi
- Date of birth: 11 September 1993 (age 33)
- Place of birth: Qatar
- Position: Winger

Team information
- Current team: Al Shahaniya (on loan from Al-Shamal)
- Number: 79

Youth career
- Qatar SC

Senior career*
| Years | Team | Apps | (Gls) |
| 2015–2019 | Qatar SC | 34 | (2) |
| 2018 | → Al-Khor (loan) | 2 | (0) |
| 2019–2020 | Al-Markhiya | | |
| 2020 | Al-Khor | 1 | (0) |
| 2020–2024 | Al-Markhiya | 36 | (3) |
| 2024– | Al-Shamal | 0 | (0) |
| 2024–2025 | → Umm Salal (loan) | 16 | (1) |
| 2025– | → Al Shahaniya (loan) | 4 | (0) |
- * Club domestic league appearances and goals as of 17 January 2026

Ali Al-Muhanadi (Arabic:علي المهندي) (born 11 September 1993) is a Qatari footballer. He currently plays for Al Shahaniya, on loan from Al-Shamal as a wingers.
