= Noor Rahman =

Pakistani footballer (born 1997)

Noor Rahman نور رحمان
Personal information
- Full name: Noor Rahman Noor Hashim Arsla Khan
- Date of birth: 28 March 1997 (age 29)
- Place of birth: Pakistan
- Height: 1.77 m (5 ft 10 in)
- Position: Right-back

Team information
- Current team: Al-Markhiya
- Number: 3

Youth career
- Lekhwiya

Senior career*
Years	Team	Apps	(Gls)
2017–2020	Al-Duhail	1	(0)
2019	→ Al-Wakrah (loan)	4	(0)
2020–2022	Al-Shahania		
2022–	Al-Markhiya	18	(0)
- * Club domestic league appearances and goals

Noor Rahman (Arabic:نور رحمان; born 28 March 1997) is a Qatari footballer who plays as a right back for Al-Markhiya.

== Career ==
=== Lekhwiya ===
Noor Rahman started his career at Lekhwiya and is a product of the Lekhwiya's youth system. On 15 April 2017, Noor Rahman made his professional debut for Lekhwiya against Al-Shahania in the Pro League, replacing Khaled Radhwan .

=== Al-Duhail ===
He was playing with Lekhwiya and after merging El Jaish and Lekhwiya clubs under the name Al-Duhail he was joined to Al-Duhail.

=== Al-Wakrah ===
On 1 February 2019 left Al-Duhail and signed with Al-Wakrah on loan until the end of the season.
