= Karib =

Karib (Arabic: كريب) is an Arabic surname. Notable people with the surname include:

- Abu Karib, 4th century ruler of Yemen
- Jenius Karib (born 1993), Malaysian football defender
- Khaled Karib (born 2000), Qatari football player
