= Al Markhiya =

Al Markhiya المرخية
- District
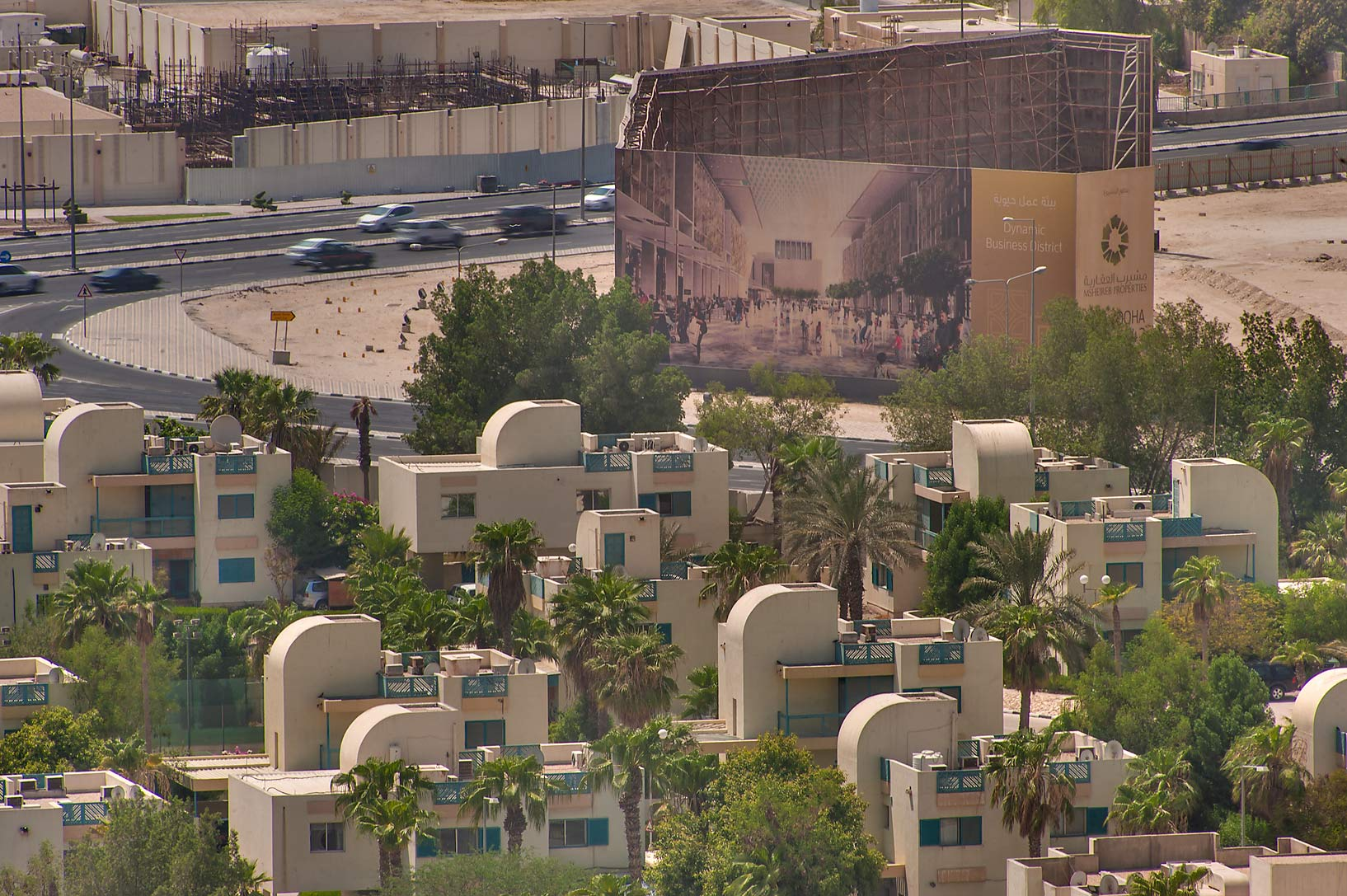
- Doha Compound off Markhiya Street

- Location within Doha Location within Qatar
- Coordinates: 25°19′21″N 51°30′28″E
- Country: Qatar
- Municipality: Doha
- Zone: Zone 33
- District no.: 31

Area
  - Total: 2.7 km^{2} (1.0 sq mi)

Population
  - Total: 5,197
  - Density: 1,900/km^{2} (5,000/sq mi)

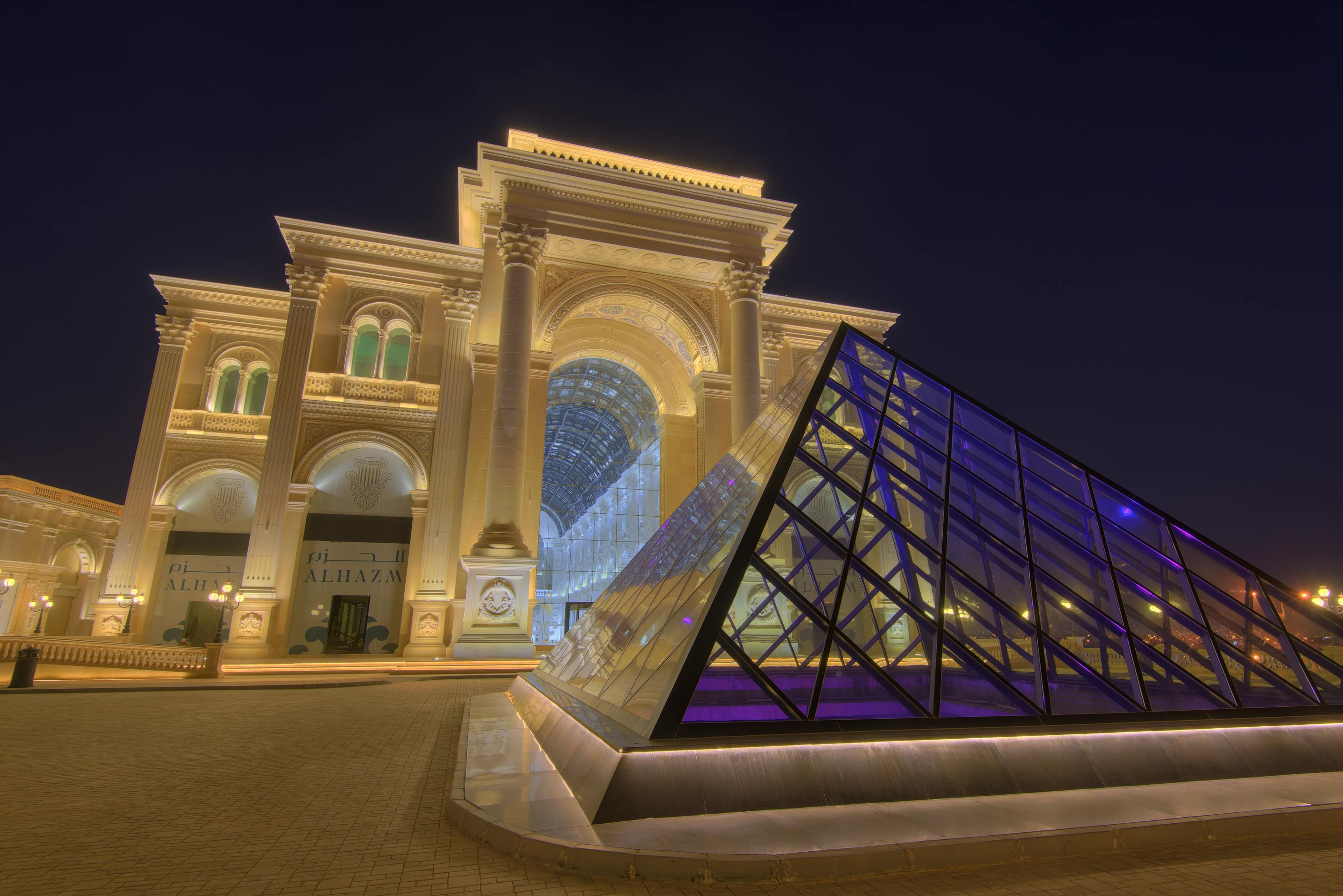
Al Hazm Mall in Al Markhiya

Al Markhiya (Arabic: المرخية, romanized: Al Markhīyah) is a neighborhood of the Qatari capital Doha. It is one of the later-developed areas of northern Doha. The district hosts three awsaq al-furjan complexes, which are part of a public development project to host all commercial establishments in centralized areas.

== Etymology ==
The district derives its name from the markh tree (Leptadenia pyrotechnica), a species that grows abundantly in the area.

== History ==
In J.G. Lorimer's 1908 geography section of the Gazetteer of the Persian Gulf, Al Markhiya was described as a camping ground with a masonry well and a garden. The garden, which was established by former emir Jassim bin Mohammed Al Thani, was enclosed by a wall and was used for date palm cultivation. Lorimer noted that it appeared to be one of the only seven sizable date palm plantations in Qatar.

== Geography ==
Al Markhiya borders the following districts:

- Lejbailat to the east, separated by Abdul Aziz Bin Jassim Street.
- Hazm Al Markhiya to the north, separated by Al Markhiya Street.
- Dahl Al Hamam to the west, separated by Bu Shaddad Street.
- Fereej Kulaib to the south, separated by Khalifa Street.

== Landmarks ==
=== Al Hazm Mall ===
Partially opened in May 2017 by Al Emady Enterprise, Al Hazm Mall is a luxurious shopping complex bearing Italian-style architecture. At a cost of QR 3 billion, the marble was imported from Italy, the stone from Palestine, and its architects were flown in from Rajasthan, India. It is accessible through Al Markhiya Street.

=== Al Markhiya Sports Club ===
Al Markhiya Sports Club's headquarters and stadium are located off of Al Markhiya Street.

== Transport ==
Major roads that run through the district are Abdul Aziz Bin Jassim Street, Al Markhiya Street and Khalifa Street.

== Demographics ==
As of the 2010 census, the district comprised 1009 housing units and 200 establishments. There were 5,197 people living in the district, of which 56% were male and 44% were female. Out of the 5,179 inhabitants, 69% were 20 years of age or older and 31% were under the age of 20. The literacy rate stood at 97.2%.

Employed persons made up 53% of the total population. Females accounted for 30% of the working population, while males accounted for 70% of the working population.

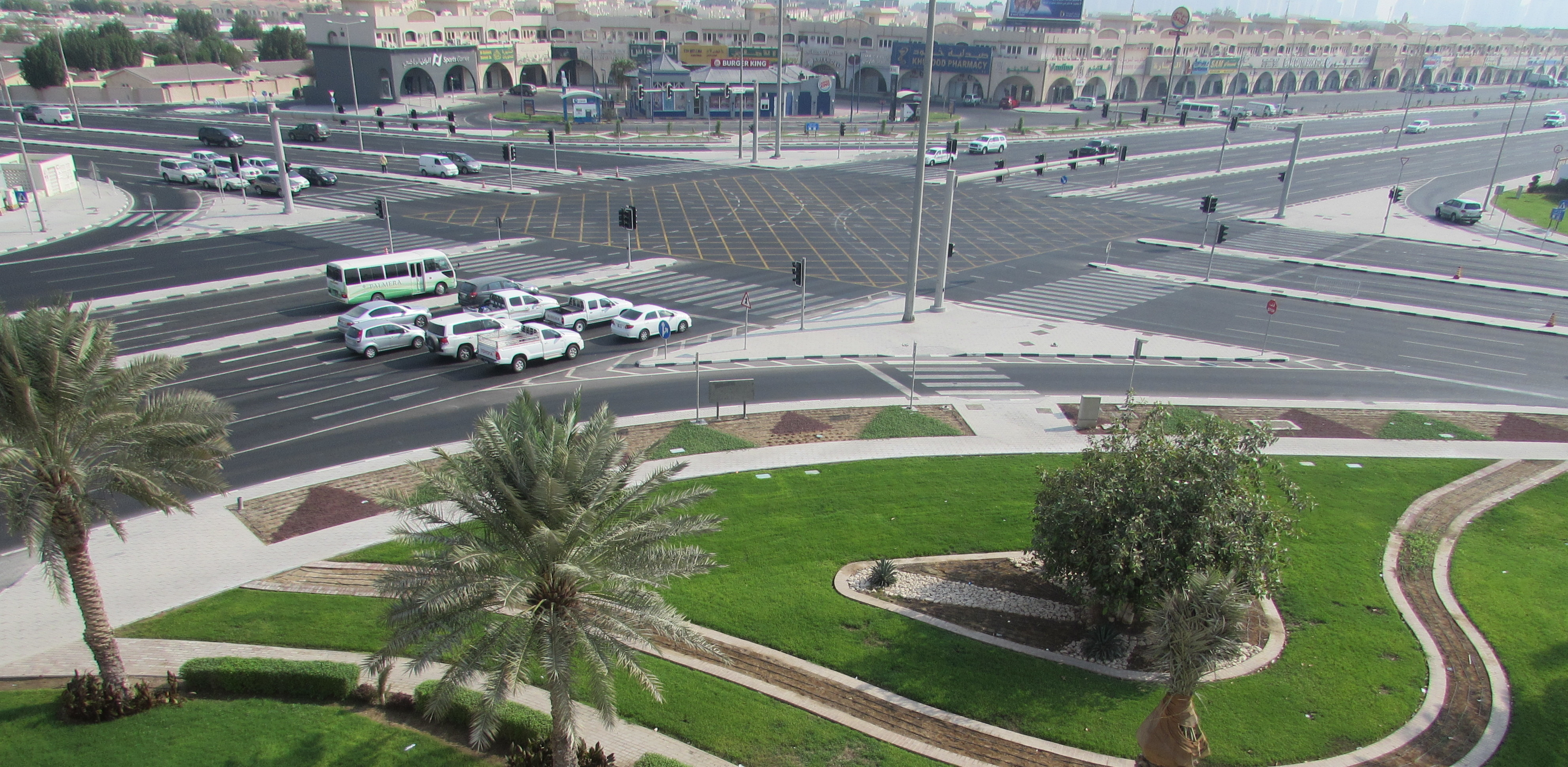
Al Markhiya Intersection

Year	Population
1986	1,419
1997	2,179
2004	2,952
2010	5,197
