= Al Hazm Mall =

Coordinates: 25°19′56.0″N 51°29′50.0″E

- الحزم مول
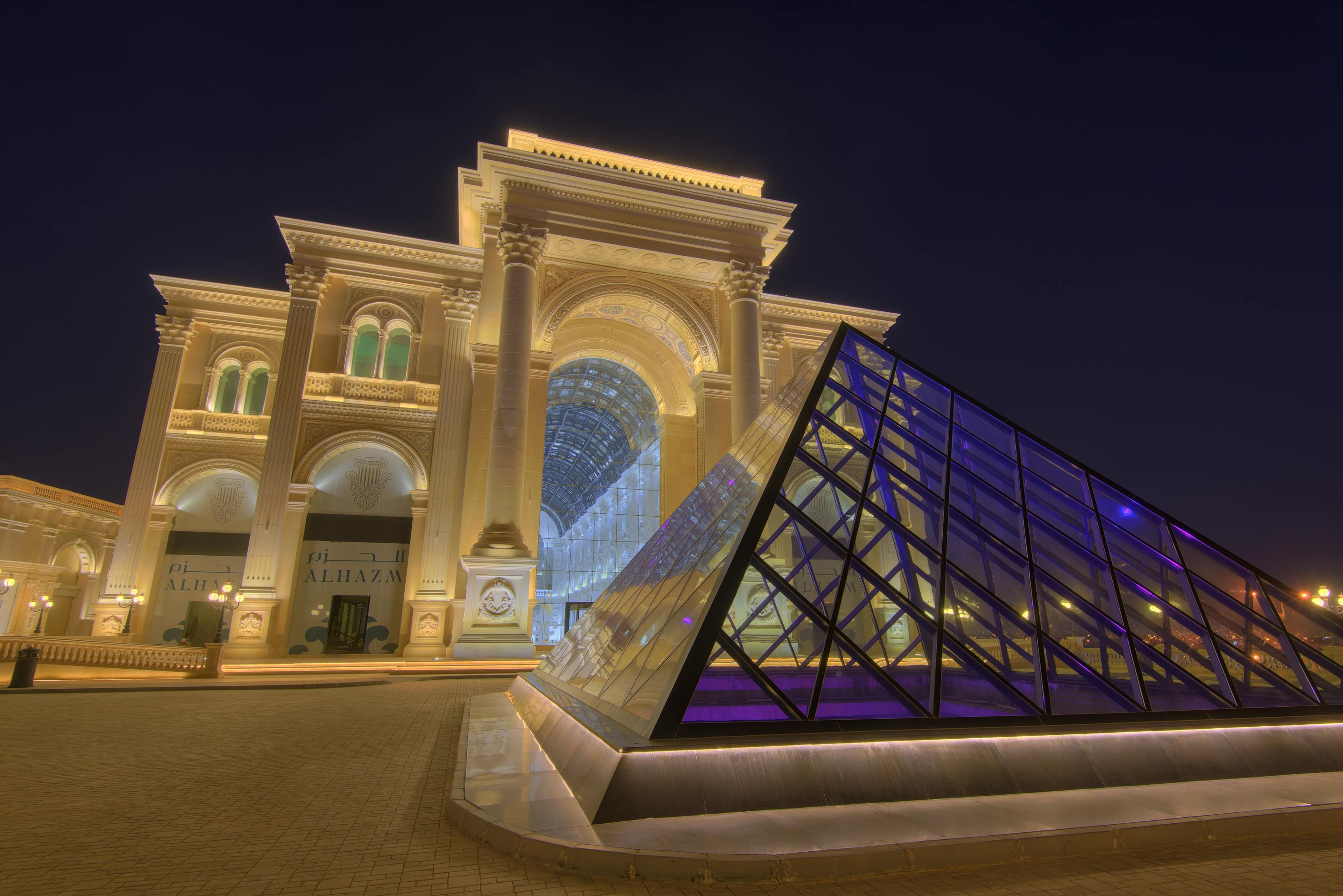
- Entrance to the Galleria Al Hazm mall
- Location: Al Markhiya, Doha, Qatar
- Address: Al Markhiya Street
- Opened: 1 May 2017; 9 years ago
- Developer: Al Emadi Enterprises
- Owner: Mohammed Abdul Karim Al Emadi
- Architect: 15 different architects
- Num. of stores: 125
- Floor area: 36,000 square metres (390,000 ft^{2})
- Parking: Multi-storey car park
- Website: alhazm.com

AlHazm Mall (Arabic: الحزم مول) is a luxury shopping mall located in the Al Markhiya district of Doha, Qatar. It opened in 2017 and was constructed at an estimated cost of $820 million. The mall is noted for its classical Italianate architecture and upscale retail environment.

AlHazm was built using approximately 41,000 tons of marble and stone imported from Tuscany, Italy. The design includes a central promenade surrounded by shops, cafés, and restaurants, as well as a landscaped courtyard featuring olive trees aged between 250 and 600 years, imported from Italy and Spain. The architecture blends European and Arabian influences.

The mall is fully air-conditioned and includes shaded outdoor areas to accommodate Qatar's climate. It is considered family-friendly, offering a range of luxury and contemporary retail brands, along with a variety of popular restaurants and cafés.

AlHazm also serves as a venue for cultural events and exhibitions. Notable exhibitions held at the mall include Teeb AlHazm (perfume and oud), Zinatha (women’s fashion and elegance), Asjad (jewelry), Tegahwa (international coffee), and Razza (men’s fashion).

AlHazm Mall is regarded as a notable destination within Qatar’s luxury retail and tourism sectors.

== Gallery ==
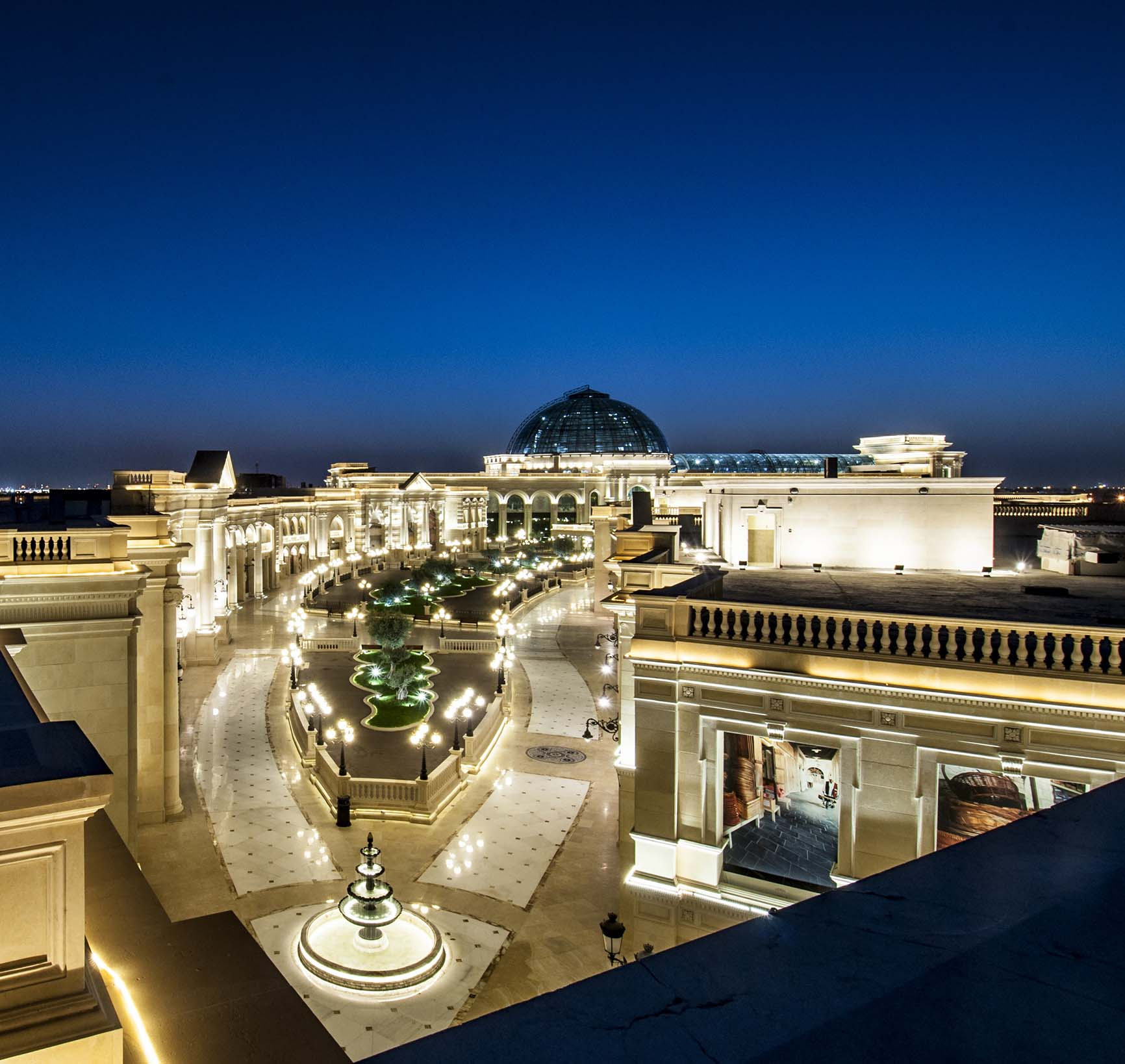
Al Hazm Roof Dome

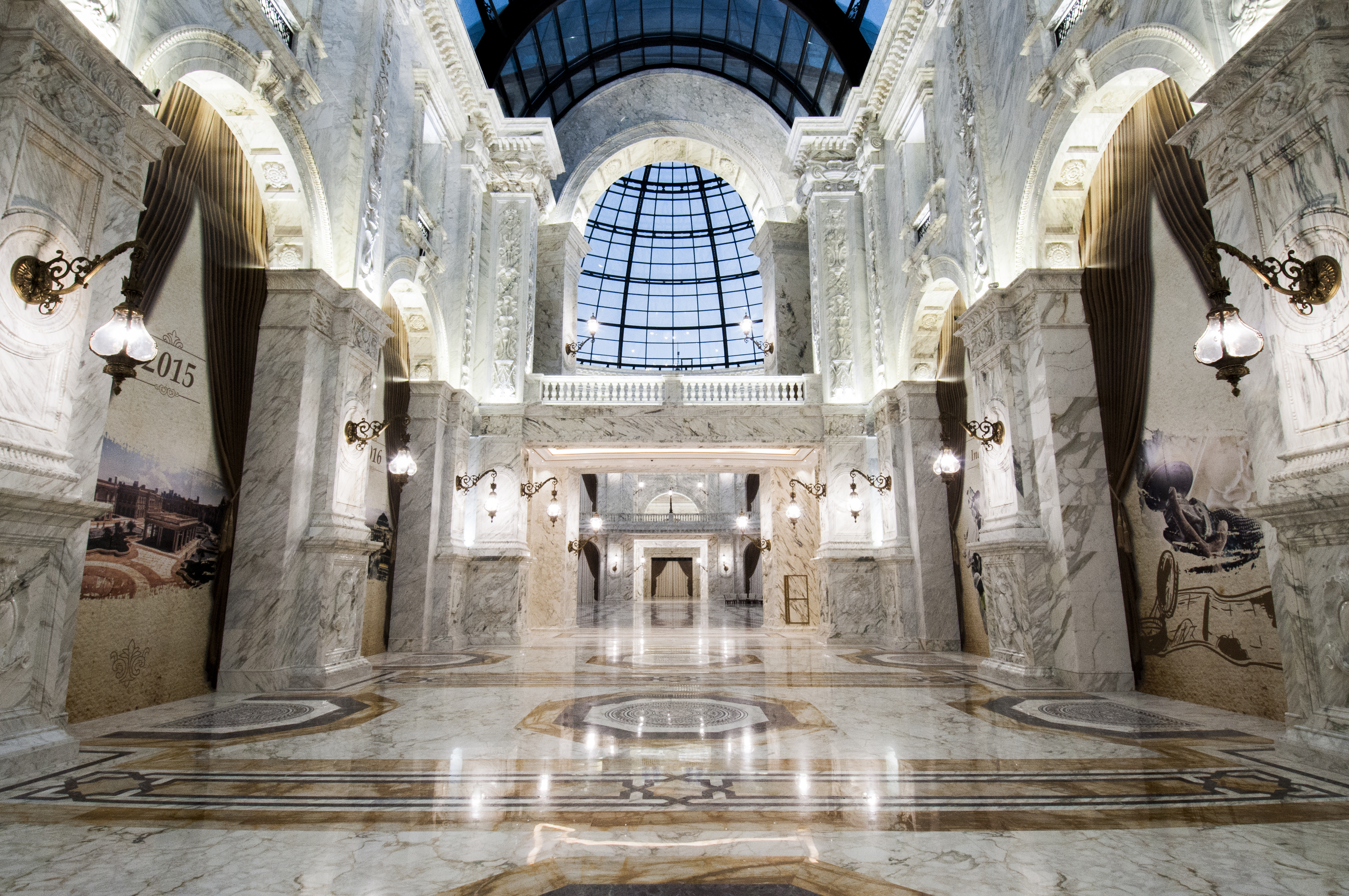
Gallaria Interior

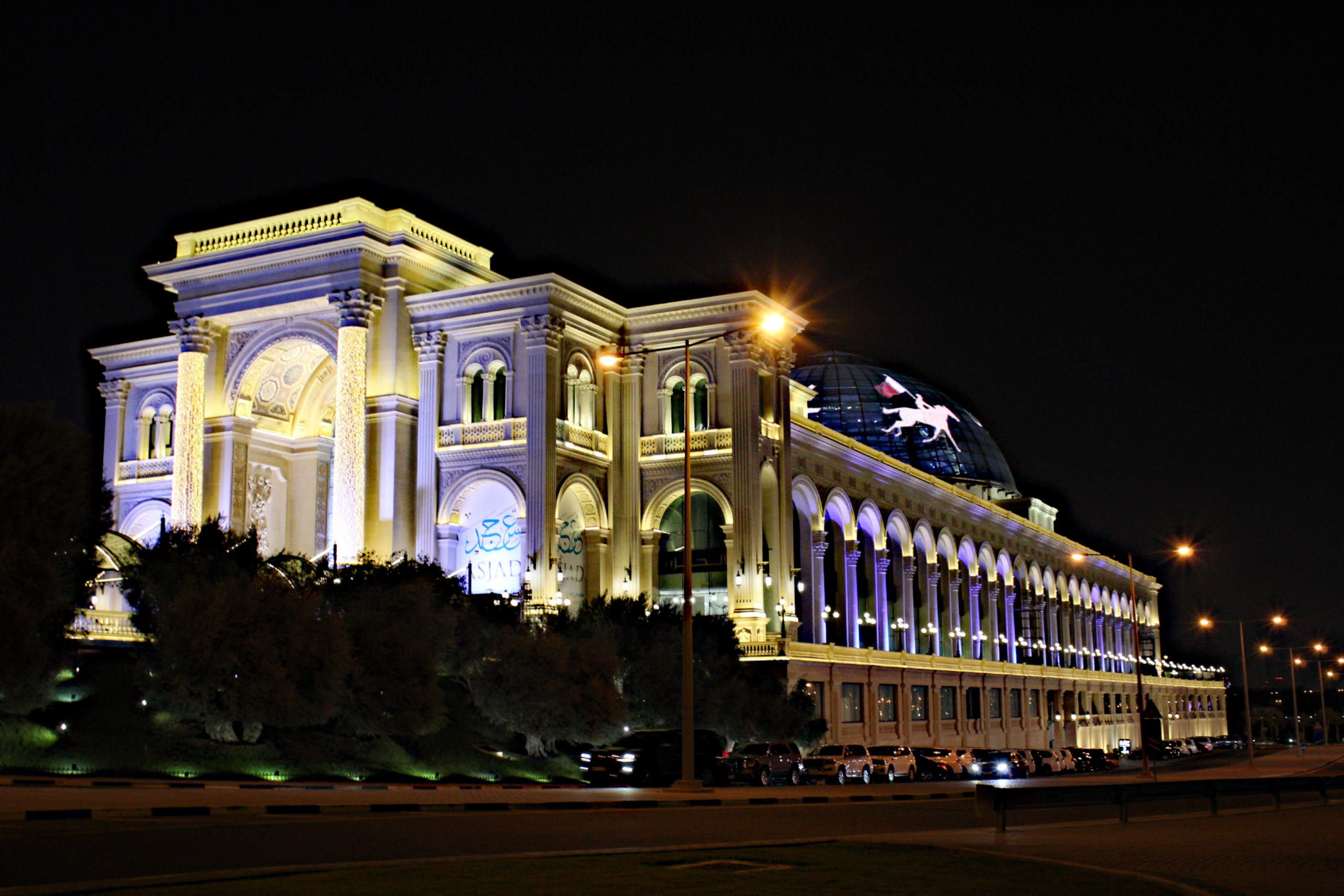
Al Hazm Building

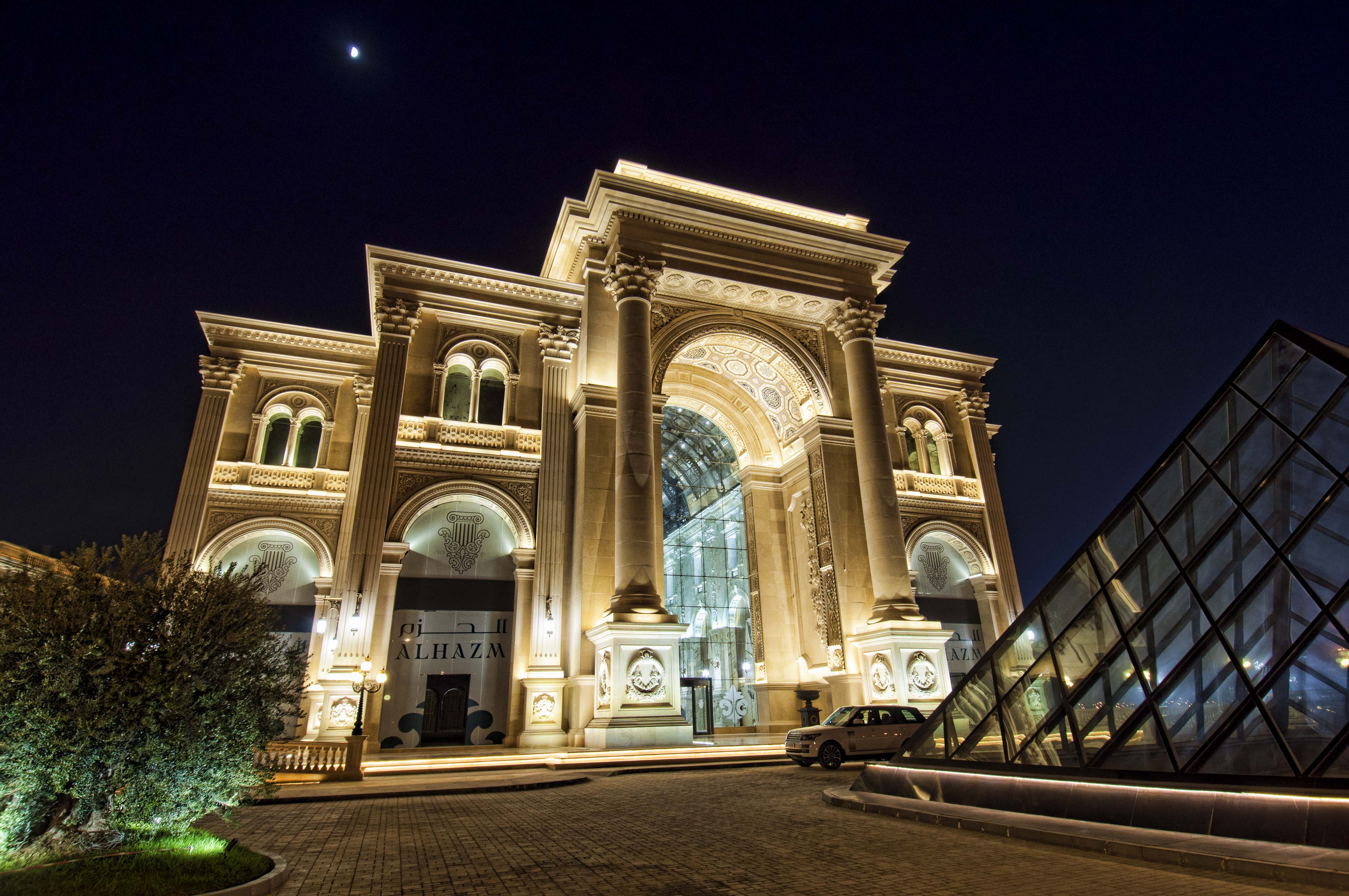
Al Hazm Galleria

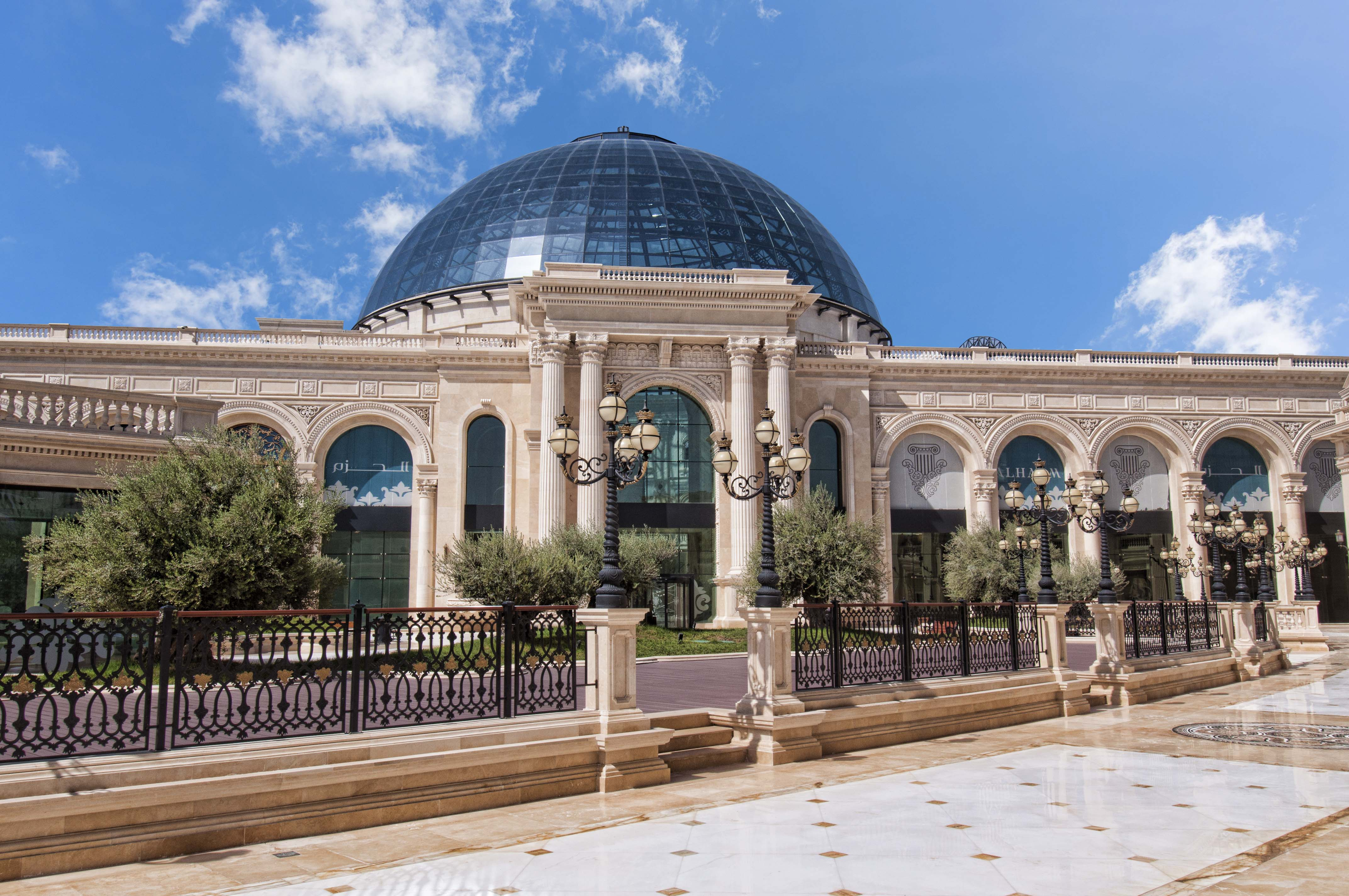
Al Hazm Dome
