= Hassan Afif =

Somali footballer and manager

Personal information
- Full name: Hassan Afif Yahya Al Yafei
- Date of birth: 20 December 1956 (age 69)
- Place of birth: Moshi, Tanzania
- Position: Midfielder

Senior career*
Years	Team	Apps	(Gls)
?	Simba S.C.	101	(27)
?	Horseed FC	5	(1)
-1986	Al Ittihad		

International career
1972–1980	Somalia	20	(?)

Managerial career
- 1986–1987: Al Ittihad
- 2001–2003: Al-Ittifaq
- 2005–2008: Al-Markhiya
- * Club domestic league appearances and goals

Hassan Afif Yahya Al Yafei (Somali: Xasan Cafiif, Arabic: حسن عفيف; born 20 December 1956) is a football manager and former footballer. Born in Tanzania, he played for the Somalia national team.

== Playing career ==
Afif played for Simba in Tanzania and Horseed in Somalia, before moving to Qatar and playing for Al Ittihad. He was later naturalized as a Qatari citizen.

He played internationally for the Somalia national team.

== Managerial career ==
After he retired as a player, he managed Al Gharafa from 1986 till 1987 and Al Markhiya from 2001 till 2003 and again in 2006 and 2007.

== Personal life ==
Born in Moshi, Tanzania, Afif was raised in Somalia. He comes from the Yafa' tribe.

He has six children with his wife, Fayza, from Yemen. His sons Ali and Akram are also footballers. They represented Qatar in the international level.
