= Khaled Radhwan =

Qatari footballer (born 1990)

Khaled Radwan
Personal information
- Full name: Khaled Radwan Sheikh Hassan
- Date of birth: 2 October 1990 (age 36)
- Place of birth: Qatar
- Position: Defender

Youth career
- –2012: Al-Shahania

Senior career*
Years	Team	Apps	(Gls)
2012–2014	Al-Shahania		
2014–2017	Lekhwiya	22	(0)
2016	→ Al-Kharaitiyat (loan)	0	(0)
2017–2025	Al-Khor	86	(3)
2023	→ Al-Markhiya (loan)	12	(0)
2025–2026	Al Ahli	9	(0)
- * Club domestic league appearances and goals

Khaled Radwan (Arabic: خالد رضوان; born 2 October 1990) is a Qatari footballer who currently plays as a Defender.

He is the son of former Syrian footballer Radwan Al-Sheikh Hassan.
