= Ibrahim Elsadig =

Sudanese footballer (born 1999)

Personal information
- Full name: Ibrahim Elsadig Ahmed
- Date of birth: 3 January 1999 (age 27)
- Place of birth: Sudan
- Position: Defender

Team information
- Current team: Al-Markhiya
- Number: 16

Youth career
- Muaither

Senior career*
Years	Team	Apps	(Gls)
2018–2022	Muaither		
2020–2021	→ Umm Salal (loan)	17	(0)
2022–2024	Al-Wakrah	5	(0)
2024–	Al-Markhiya	0	(0)
- * Club domestic league appearances and goals

Ibrahim Elsadig (Arabic: إبراهيم الصادق; born 3 January 1999) is a Sudanese footballer who plays for Al-Markhiya as a defender.
