= Ahmed Aboutrika =

Egyptian footballer (born 2003)

Personal information
- Full name: Ahmed Mohamed Aboutrika
- Date of birth: 14 March 2003 (age 23)
- Place of birth: Egypt
- Position: Attacking midfielder

Team information
- Current team: Al-Markhiya
- Number: 7

Youth career
- –2020: Al-Arabi

Senior career*
Years	Team	Apps	(Gls)
2020–2023	Al-Arabi	7	(0)
2023–	Al-Markhiya	18	(0)
- * Club domestic league appearances and goals as of 11 September 2025

Ahmed Mohamed Mohamed Mohamed Aboutrika (born 14 March 2003), is an Egyptian professional footballer who plays for Al-Markhiya as an attacking midfielder.

== Career ==
Aboutrika started his career at Al-Arabi. is constantly playing with the Al-Arabi U23, with whom he ranked third in the 2019–20 league championship, and scored some goals with the team, On 18 June 2020, he was chosen to join the first team training in Al-Arabi . On 24 July 2020, Aboutrika made his professional debut for Al-Arabi against Al-Gharafa in the Pro League, replacing Aron Gunnarsson .

== Personal life ==
Aboutrika is the son of the former Egypt national team and Al Ahly football player Mohamed Aboutrika.

== Career statistics ==
=== Club ===
As of 25 July 2020.

Club	Season	League			Cup		Continental		Other		Total	
Club	Season	Division	Apps	Goals	Apps	Goals	Apps	Goals	Apps	Goals	Apps	Goals
Al-Arabi	2019–20	Qatar Stars League	1	0	0	0	0	0	0	0	1	0
Career total			1	0	0	0	0	0	0	0	1	0
