= Saif Al-Mohannadi =

Qatari footballer (born 1997)

Personal information
- Full name: Saif Hassan Ali Al-Mohannadi
- Date of birth: 14 April 1997 (age 29)
- Place of birth: Qatar
- Position: Midfielder

Team information
- Current team: Al-Khor
- Number: 7

Youth career
- Al-Khor

Senior career*
Years	Team	Apps	(Gls)
2016–2021	Al-Khor	9	(0)
2021–2024	Muaither	53	(1)
2024	Al Shahaniya	0	(0)
2024–	Al-Khor	8	(0)
- * Club domestic league appearances and goals

Saif Al-Mohannadi (Arabic:سيف المهندي) (born 14 April 1997) is a Qatari footballer who currently plays for Al-Khor as a midfielder.
