= Al-Markhiya Stadium =

Football stadium in Doha, Qatar

Coordinates: 25°19′56.1″N 51°29′39.4″E

- Location in Doha, Qatar Location in Qatar
- Address: Al Markhiya; Qatar
- Location: Doha, Qatar
- Capacity: 300
- Surface: Grass

Construction
- Opened: 1996
- Renovated: 2005
- Expanded: 2011

Tenant
- Al-Markhiya SC

Al-Markhiya Stadium is a football stadium in the Al Markhiya district of Doha, Qatar. The football team Al-Markhiya SC play there. Built in 1996, the Al-Markhiya Stadium covers 68,000 m^{2} (730,000 sq ft) and features a football pitch with a capacity for 300 people, locker rooms and an administrative office.

== Location ==
Al-Markhiya Stadium is accessible via public transportation. The nearest bus stop is on Qurtuba Street, approximately a 25-minute walk from the stadium. The closest metro station is the Doha Exhibition and Convention Center (DECC), about a 30-minute walk away. Bus lines L519 and T607 serve the area, and the M1 metro line stops near the DECC station.
