= Khaled Karib =

Qatari footballer (born 2000)

Personal information
- Full name: Khaled Mossad Karib
- Date of birth: 23 January 2000 (age 26)
- Place of birth: Qatar
- Position: Full-back

Team information
- Current team: Al-Khor
- Number: 17

Youth career
- –2020: Al-Duhail

Senior career*
Years	Team	Apps	(Gls)
2020–2021	Al-Duhail	0	(0)
2021–	Al-Khor	21	(0)
- * Club domestic league appearances and goals as of 13:37, 12 April 2021 (UTC)

Khaled Mossad Karib (Arabic: خالد مسعد كريب; born 23 January 2000) is a Qatari professional footballer who plays as left-back for Qatari club Al-Khor.

== Career ==
Khaled started his career with Al-Duhail and is a product of the Al-Duhail's youth system. On 31 January 2021, he joined Al-Khor.
