= Talal Al-Shila =

Qatari footballer (born 1991)

Talal Al-Shila طلال شلة
Personal information
- Full name: Talal Ali Al-Shila
- Date of birth: 2 December 1991 (age 34)
- Place of birth: Sudan
- Height: 1.80 m (5 ft 11 in)
- Position: Midfielder

Team information
- Current team: Al Ahli
- Number: 4

Youth career
- Al-Shamal

Senior career*
Years	Team	Apps	(Gls)
2012–2016	Al-Shamal		
2016–2025	Al-Markhiya	83	(1)
2018–2019	→ Umm Salal (loan)	14	(0)
2024–2025	→ Al-Shamal (loan)	11	(0)
2025–	Al Ahli	5	(0)
- * Club domestic league appearances and goals as of 17 January 2026

Talal Al-Shila (Arabic:طلال شلة) (born 2 December 1991) is a Qatari footballer. He currently plays as a midfielder for Al Ahli.

== Career ==
He formerly played for Al-Shamal, Al-Markhiya, and Umm Salal.
