= Younes Ali =

Qatari footballer (born 1983)

Personal information
- Full name: Younes Ali Rahmati
- Date of birth: 3 January 1983 (age 43)
- Place of birth: Doha, Qatar
- Height: 1.69 m (5 ft 6 1/2 in)
- Position: Midfielder

Team information
- Current team: Al Shahaniya (head coach)

Senior career*
Years	Team	Apps	(Gls)
2000–2007	Al Ahli	118	(5)
2007–2013	Al-Rayyan	118	(4)
2013–2014	Umm Salal SC	6	(0)
2014–2017	Al Ahli	61	(1)
Total		303	(10)

International career
2003–2013	Qatar	29	(1)

Managerial career
- 2019–2020: Al-Markhiya
- 2020–2021: Qatar SC
- 2021–2024: Al-Arabi
- 2024–2025: Al-Rayyan
- 2025–2026: Al Ahli
- 2026–: Al Shahaniya
- * Club domestic league appearances and goals

Younes Ali Rahmati (Persian: یونس‌علی رحمتی; born 3 January 1983) is a Qatari football coach and a former player who is the currently head coach of Qatar Stars League club Al Shahaniya. He played as a midfielder and was a member of the Qatar national football team.

Ali is nicknamed "Guardiola" because he used to play alongside Pep Guardiola, whom he considered his role model, in Al Ahli.

== Club career statistics ==
Statistics accurate as of 21 May 2019

Club	Season	League	League		Cup^{1}		League Cup^{2}		Continental^{3}		Total	
Club	Season	League	Apps	Goals	Apps	Goals	Apps	Goals	Apps	Goals	Apps	Goals
Al Ahli	2000–01	QSL	16	0								
Al Ahli	2001–02	QSL	0	0								
Al Ahli	2002–03	QSL	14	2								
Al Ahli	2003–04	QSL	15	0								
Al Ahli	2004–05	QSL	22	2								
Al Ahli	2005–06	QSL	26	0								
Al Ahli	2006–07	QSL	25	1								
Al Ahli	Total		118	5								
Al Rayyan	2007–08	QSL	20	0								
Al Rayyan	2008–09	QSL	25	3								
Al Rayyan	2009–10	QSL	20	0								
Al Rayyan	2010–11	QSL	17	0								
Al Rayyan	2011-12	QSL	15	1								
Al Rayyan	2012-13	QSL	21	0								
Al Rayyan	Total		118	4								
Umm Salal SC	2013–14	QSL	6	0								
Al Ahli	2014–15	QSL	24	0								
Al Ahli	2015–16	QSL	19	0								
Al Ahli	2016–17	QSL	18	1								
Al Ahli	Total		61	1								
Career total			303	10								

^{1}Includes Emir of Qatar Cup.

^{2}Includes Sheikh Jassem Cup.

^{3}Includes AFC Champions League.
