= Al-Khor SC =

Association football club in Qatar

- Full name: Al-Khor Sports Club
- Nickname: Al-Fursan (The Knights)
- Founded: 1961; 65 years ago
- Ground: Al Khor Stadium; Al Bayt Stadium; Al Khor, Qatar
- Capacity: 11,015
- Chairman: Nasser Thamer Al-Humaidi
- Head coach: Talal Al-Bloushi (caretaker)
- League: Qatari Second Division
- 2024–25: Qatar Stars League, 12th of 12 (relegated)
- Website: alkhor-club.com
Home colours	Away colours

Al-Khor Sports Club (Arabic: نادي الخور الرياضي) is a Qatari professional sports club based in the city of Al Khor. Al-Khor SC is best known for its football team, which competes in the Qatar Stars League from the 2024-25 season again after a short absence of 2 years in Qatari Second Division. It plays its home games at Al-Khor Stadium.

== History ==
=== Foundation period (1951–1964) ===
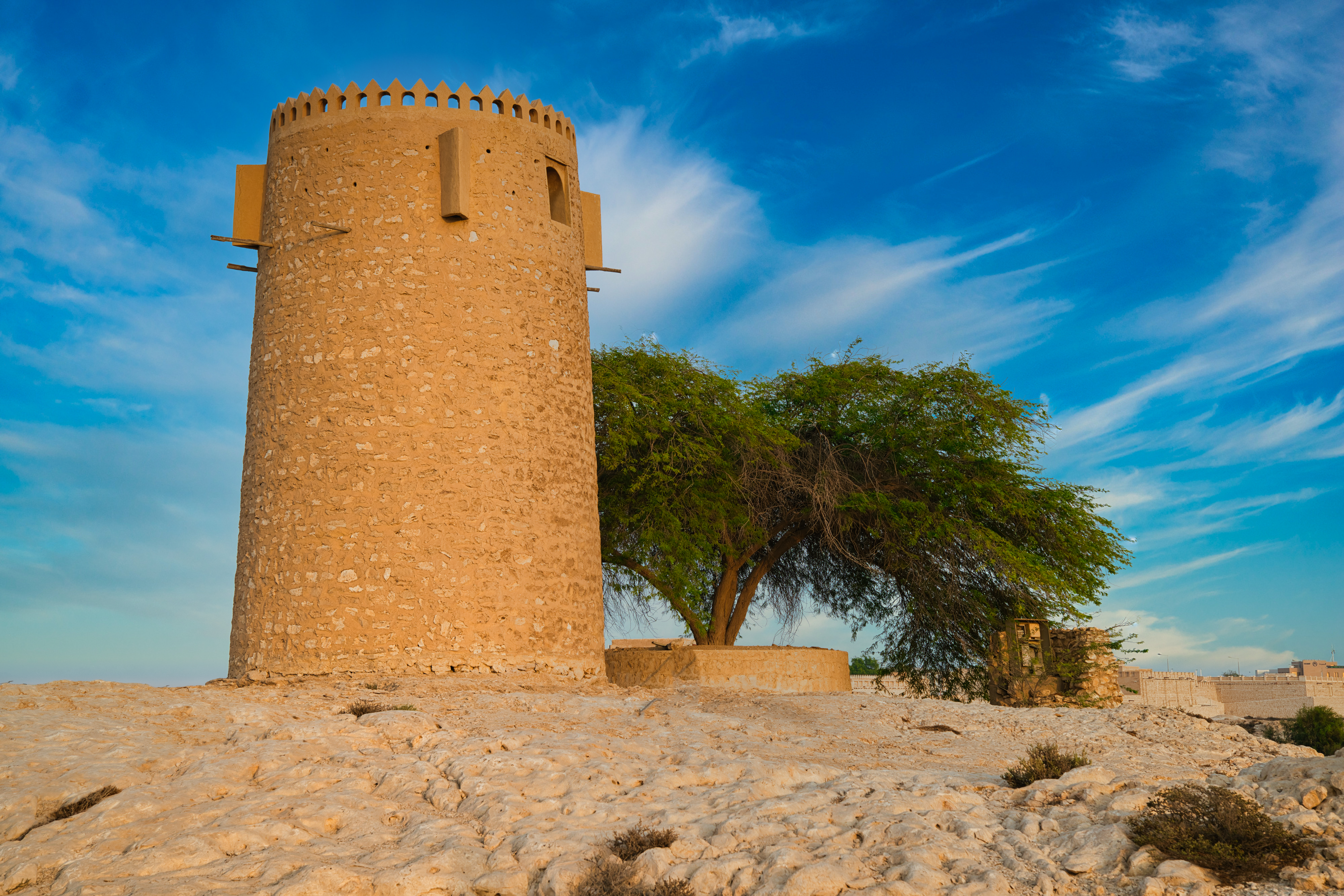
One of the three Al Khor Towers, represented in the club logo

Al-Khor was unofficially established in 1951 as "Al-Taawun", The club was created by oil workers to fulfill their needs with the appropriate facilities to invest their energy after their participation with the multinational oil companies at the time.

In 1961, the club was re-established and set football as its main sport, along with other sports and activities. There were two other clubs in Al Khor, but none of the clubs cooperated. In 1962, Al-Khor SC merged with Al-Jeel Sports Club, one of the other two clubs.

In 1964, they conglomerated with Nahdi Al-Aswad ("Black Sports Club") and formally made a request to join the Qatar Football Association on 10 June that year. From then on, the club was known as Al-Taawun.

=== Post-merger (1964–2004) ===
The club took advantage of the youth movement and was provided with funds for all facilities. He designed plans and programs to increase the number of participants in the majority of sports. Since 1961, yellow and white were the club colors. In 1964 the club entered the football league and changed the colors to blue and white. Currently, all three colors are included in the crest.

=== Renaming to Al Khor (2004–present) ===
In 2004, the club name was changed to Al Khor after the Qatar Olympic Committee had ordered the name change to clarify the location of the club.

== Honours ==
- Qatar Crown Prince Cup
  - Winners (1): 2005
- Qatar Sheikh Jassem Cup
  - Winners (1): 2002
- Qatari 2nd Division:
  - Winners (2): 1983, 2024

== Asian record ==
Competition	Pld	W	D	L	GF	GA
GCC Champions League	51	22	11	18	75	61
Total	15	6	2	7	14	25

- Q = Qualification
- GS = Group stage
- R16 = Round of 16
- QF = Quarter-final
- SF = Semi-final

GCC Champions League

Round	Country	Club	Home	Away	Aggregate
2008
GS	(Saudi Arabia)	Al-Nassr	1–3		
GS	(Kuwait)	Qadsia	0–5		
GS	(Oman)	Al-Nahda	1–1		
GS	(Bahrain)	Al Muharraq	1–1		
2009–10
GS	(Oman)	Sur	1–0	0–1	1–1
GS	(Saudi Arabia)	Al-Nassr	0–4	1–3	1–7
2012
GS	(Kuwait)	Al Naser	2–1	1–0	3–0
GS	(Bahrain)	Busaiteen	2–0	1–2	3–2
QF	(Kuwait)	Al Jahra	1–0		
SF	(United Arab Emirates)	Al Wasl	2–1	0–3	2–4

== Individual honours ==
2009 FIFA Confederations Cup:

The following players have played in the FIFA Confederations Cup whilst playing for Al Khor:
- (Iraq) 2009 – Alaa Abdul-Zahra
- (Iraq) 2009 – Mahdi Karim
- (Iraq) 2009 – Salam Shakir

== Performance in UAFA competitions ==
- Arabian Gulf Club Champions Cup: 3 appearances

2008: Group stage
2010: Group stage
2011: Semi-finals
2012: Semi-finals

== Players ==
As of Qatari Second Division:

Note: Flags indicate national team as defined under FIFA eligibility rules; some limited exceptions apply. Players may hold more than one non-FIFA nationality.

No.	Pos.	Nation	Player
1	GK	BRA	Lacerda
2	DF	QAT	Khaled Karib
3	DF	QAT	Ibrahim Al-Saeed
5	MF	QAT	Youssef Mohamed Ali
6	MF	ESP	Gerard Hernández (on loan from Al-Arabi)
7	FW	QAT	Ali Al-Muhannadi
8	MF	QAT	Saif Al-Mohannadi
10	FW	CPV	Ricardo Gomes
12	DF	QAT	Khaled Mahmoudi
13	DF	NIG	Yassir Boussawi
14	DF	QAT	Helal Mohammed
16	DF	QAT	Khaled Radhwan
17	FW	QAT	Jaime Pombo
18	FW	BRA	Luan Dias
20	MF	QAT	Ahmed Al-Mohanadi

No.	Pos.	Nation	Player
21	MF	FRA	Mayssam Benama
22	GK	QAT	Abdulrahman Al-Shaibah
25	MF	QAT	Mohammed Abdelrahman
27	MF	QAT	Jasser Yahya
42	MF	SEN	Mouhamed Dabo (on loan from Al-Shamal)
49	MF	QAT	Mohamed Khalid
50	GK	QAT	Ziad Shoaib
55	DF	EGY	Youssef Safwat
74	DF	EGY	Abdulrahman Ragab
85	MF	PLE	Mohammad Swelah
97	DF	PLE	Yaser Hamed
99	MF	NGR	Abdulah Oyekanmi
—	DF	POR	Filipe Sousa
—	DF	ESP	Carlos Sánchez

=== Out on loan ===
Note: Flags indicate national team as defined under FIFA eligibility rules; some limited exceptions apply. Players may hold more than one non-FIFA nationality.

No.	Pos.	Nation	Player
19	MF	FRA	Ibrahima Diallo (at Al Shahaniya)

== Personnel ==
=== Current technical staff ===
Last update: May 2024

Coaching staff
Head coach	Salam Shaker (Interim)
Assistant coaches	Pepe Bermúdez
Goalkeeper coach	Pinda
President of the Football device	Hamad Dasmal Al-Kuwari
Director general	Abdul Rahman Hassan Al-Emadi
Fitness coach	Alberto Martínez
Performance Analyst	Hugo Pinto
Team Doctor	Hisham Al-Mutawakel
Therapy specialists	Omar Miladi; Anis Belhadj

== Presidential history ==
From 1963 to 1982.

Period	Chairperson	Period	Chairperson
1963–64	(Qatar) Saleh Mohammed Dawood Mohannadi	1966–75	(Qatar) Saleh Mohammed Dawood Mohannadi
1964–65	(Qatar) Ahmed Abdullah Al Mohannadi	1975	(Qatar) Mohammed Saif Maeoff
1965–66	(Qatar) Ahmed Abdullah Jolo	1975–82	(Qatar) Ahmed Abdul Aziz Al-Hail
1982	(Qatar) Saleh Mohammed Dawood Mohannadi		

== Managerial history ==
As of 11 May 2023

- (England) Ronald Douglas (ca.) (1979)
- (Brazil) Marcos Falopa (1979–80)
- (Qatar) Mohammed Mubarak Al Mohannadi (1980)
- (Brazil) Marcos Falopa (1980–82)
- (Brazil) Alcides Romano Junior (1987–89)
- (Hungary) Antal Szentmihályi (1991–92)
- (Hungary) Szapor Gábor (1993–94)
- (Sweden) Bosse Nilsson (1995)
- (Iraq) Mowaffaq Mawla (1997–98)
- (Brazil) Alcides Romano Junior (1998)
- (Brazil) Roberto Carlos (1998–99)
- (Brazil) José Roberto Ávila (1999–00)
- (Brazil) Paulo Henrique (2000–01)
- (Brazil) João Francisco (2001–02)
- (France) Ladislas Lozano (1 July 2002 – 30 June 2003)
- (Brazil) René Simões (2003)
- (Switzerland) Robert Mullier (2003–04)
- (France) René Exbrayat (2004–06)
- (France) Jean-Paul Rabier (1 July 2006 – 30 June 2008)
- (France) Ladislas Lozano (ca.) (Nov 2007)
- (France) Bertrand Marchand (1 July 2008 – 14 June 2010)
- (France) Alain Perrin (14 June 2010 – 31 May 2012)
- (Romania) László Bölöni (24 June 2012–15)
- (France) Jean Fernandez (2015–2017)
- (France) Laurent Banide (2017 – October 2017)
- (England) Omar Najhi (October 2017)
- (Tunisia) Nacif Beyaoui (October 2017 – May 2018)
- (Tunisia) Adel Sellimi (1 July 2018 – 15 September 2018)
- (England) Omar Najhi (September 2018)
- (France) Bernard Casoni (25 September 2018 – June 30, 2019)
- (England) Omar Najhi (1 July 2019 – 30 September 2020)
- (France) Frédéric Hantz (1 October 2020 – 25 December 2020)
- (Qatar) Mostafa Souiheb (26 December 2020 – 24 January 2021)
- (Germany) Winfried Schafer (25 January 2021 – 12 November 2021)
- (Brazil) Sérgio Farias (23 June 2022 – 17 October 2022)
- (Morocco) Hicham Jadrane (18 October 2022 – 8 April 2023)
- (Qatar) Nabeel Mohammad Anwar (9 April 2023 – 5 January 2024)
- (Qatar) Abdullah Mubarak (8 January 2024 – present)
