= Hicham Jadrane =

Moroccan football manager

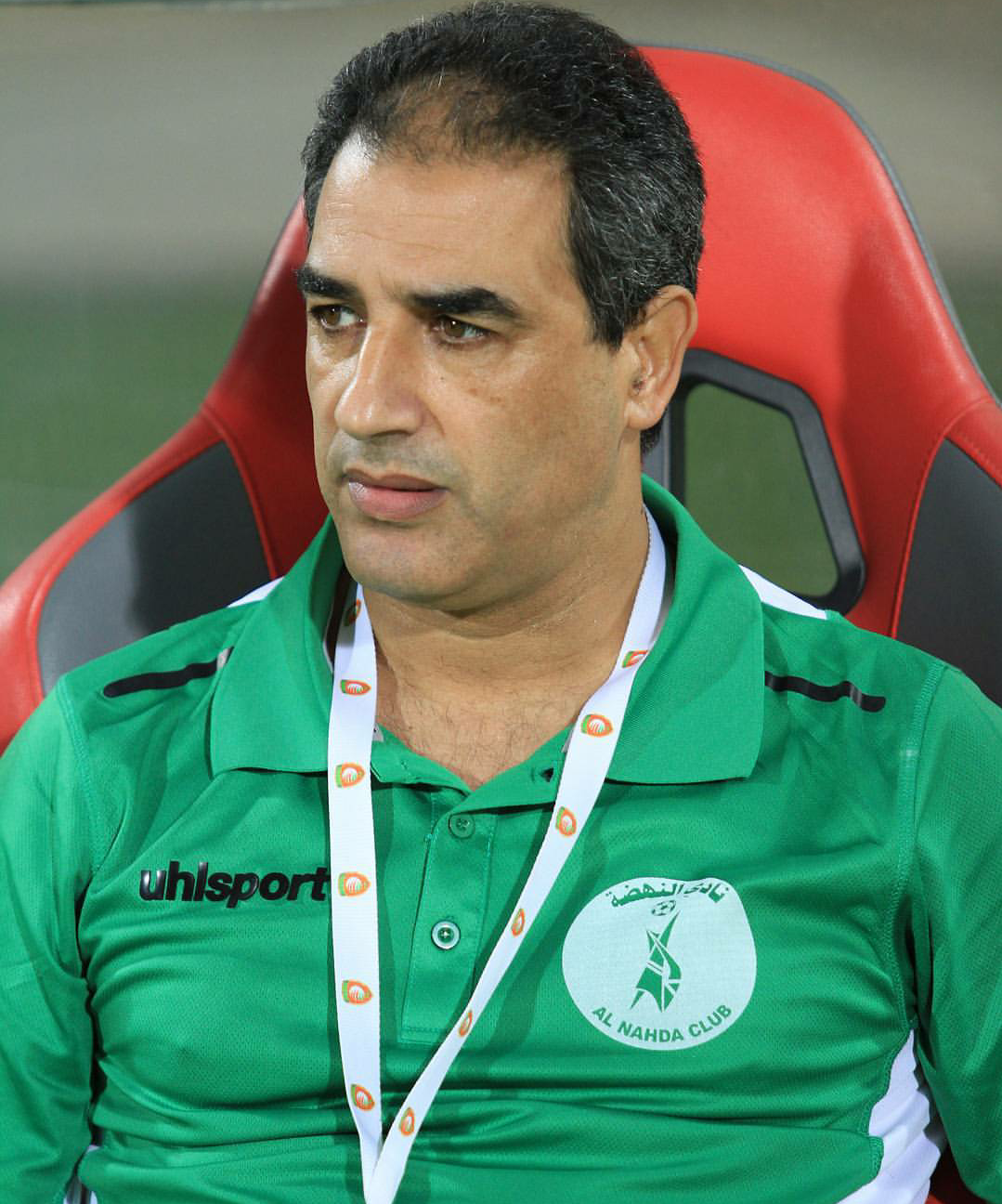
- Hicham Jadrane, Moroccan football manager

Personal information
- Full name: Hicham Jadrane Chazouani
- Date of birth: 12 March 1968 (age 58)
- Place of birth: Rabat, Morocco
- Height: 1.80 m (5 ft 11 in)
- Position: Midfielder

Youth career
- Fath Union Sport

Senior career*
Years	Team	Apps	(Gls)
	Fath Union Sport	?	(?)
1993–1994	Roquetas	?	(?)
1989–1990	Logroñés	?	(?)
Total		?	(?)

Managerial career
- 2000–2002: La Mojonera
- 2002–2003: UD Almería U-20
- 2003–2004: UD Almería
- 2004–2006: Polideportivo Ejido
- 2006–2007: Raja Casablanca (Assistant)
- 2007–2008: Fath Union Sport
- 2008–2009: Las Norias
- 2010–2011: US Témara
- 2011–2012: Polideportivo Ejido
- 2012–2013: Al-Tali'aa
- 2013–2014: Fanja
- 2015–2016: Al-Nahda
- 2016–2017: East Riffa Club
- 2017–2018: Buildcon Football Club
- 2018-2022: Al-Shamal SC
- 2023: Al-Markhiya SC
- * Club domestic league appearances and goals

Hicham Jadrane Chazouani (Arabic: هشام جدران الشزواني; born 12 March 1968) is a Moroccan professional football manager.

== Personal life ==
On 13 May 1995, he received his Spanish passport and hence he shares dual-citizenship between Morocco and Spain. He is a diploma in Experimental Sciences.

== Playing career ==
Hicham began his playing career with the U-14 team of Fath Union Sport, based in his home town, Rabat. He later began his professional footballing career with the first team of Fath Union Sport. In 1988, he moved to Agadir where he signed a two-year contract with Hassania Agadir (then known as ONEP). In 1990, he along with his family moved to Spain for completing his studies and in 1992, he began his footballing career in Spain with Tercera División club, CD Roquetas. In 1994, he moved to Logroño-based club CD Logroñés of La Liga and thus ending his playing career to pursue his further studies.

== Managerial career ==
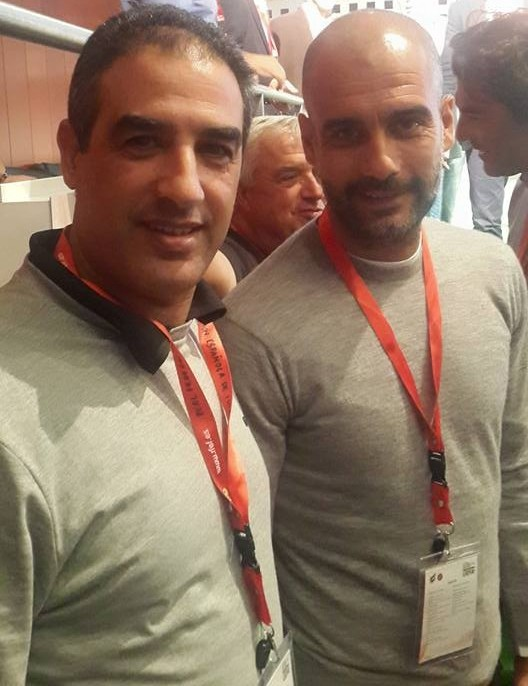
Hicham Jadrane and Pep Guardiola

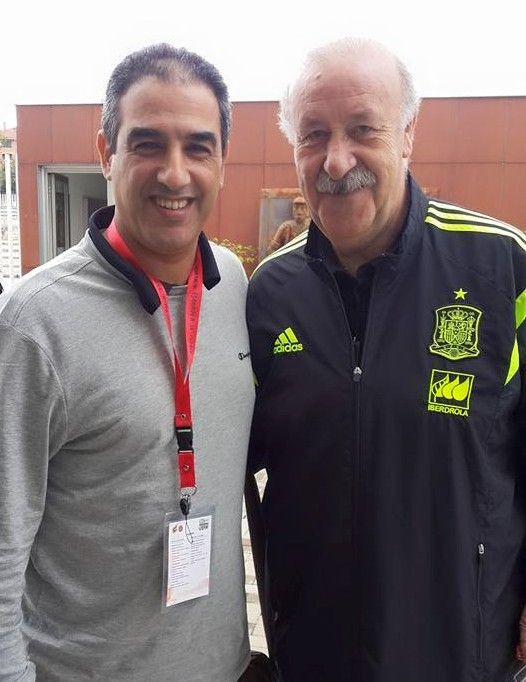
Hicham Jadrane and Vicente Del Bosque

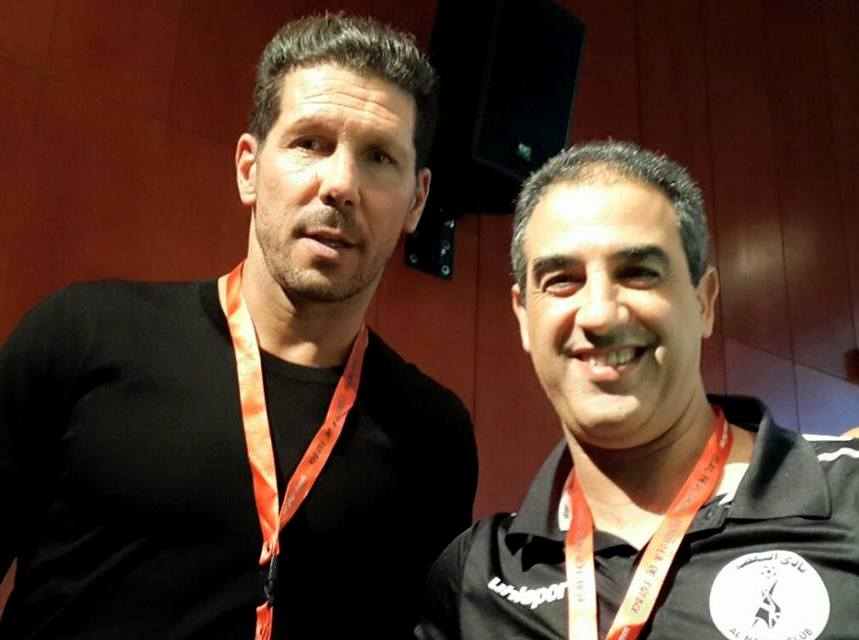
Hicham Jadrane and Diego Simeone

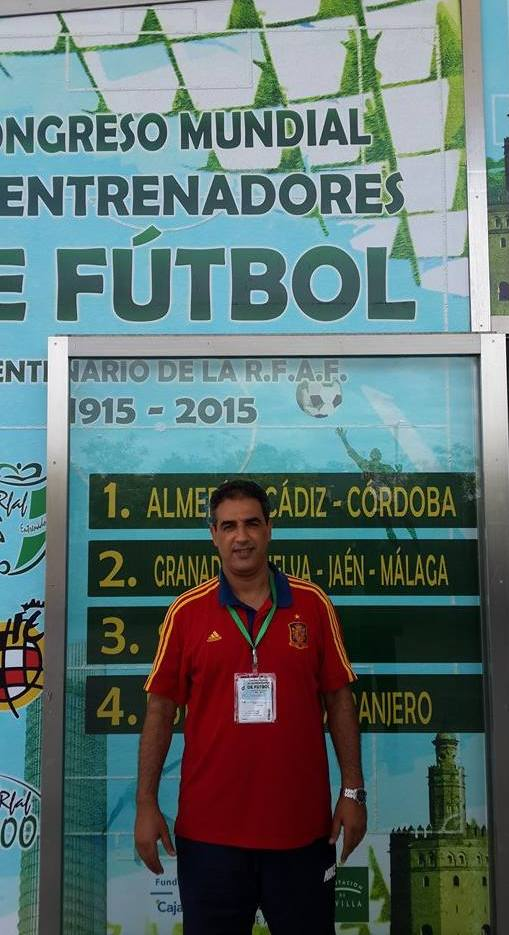
2015 Congreso Mundial de Entrenadores, Sevilla

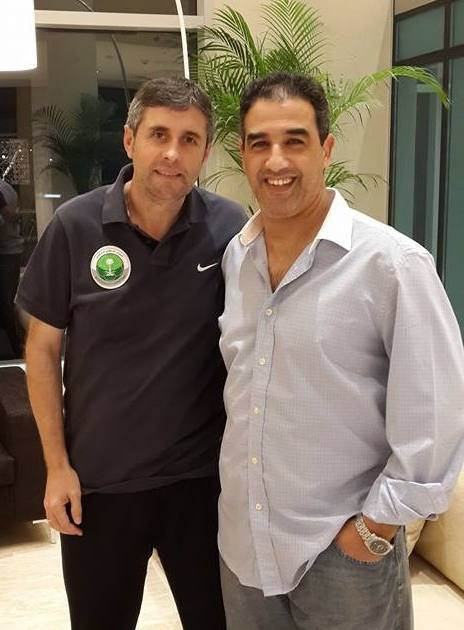
With Juan Ramón López Caro

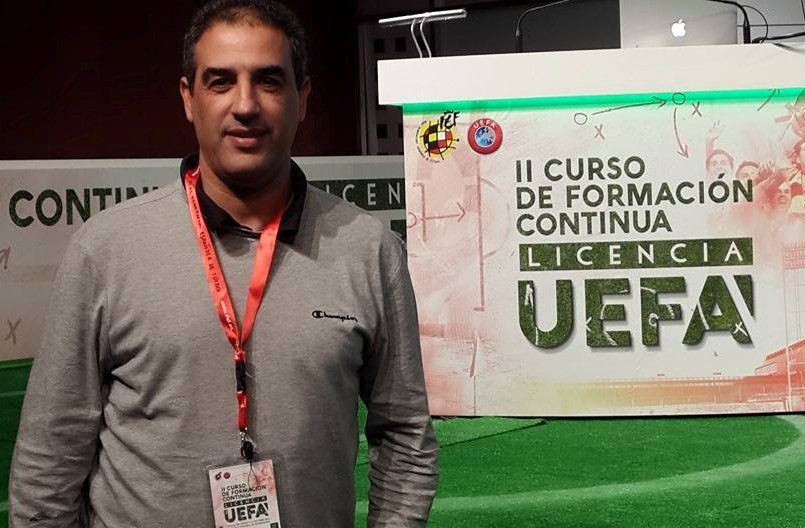
At the 2015 2nd UEFA License Formation, Royal Spanish Football Federation, Las Rozas

Hicham holds the UEFA Pro Licence, the highest football coaching qualification. He received the UEFA Pro Licence on 30 November 2013 from the Royal Spanish Football Federation. He also holds the A Coaching License since 2009 from Royal Moroccan Football Federation and the UEFA A License since 2010 from the Royal Spanish Football Federation. He is also the holder of First Degree and Second Degree diplomas from Andalusia Football Federation (FAF).

=== La Mojonera ===
He began his managerial career with Divisiones Regionales de Fútbol in Andalusia club La Mojonera C.F. in 2000.

=== Polideportivo Ejido ===
In 2002, he moved to El Ejido where he was appointed as the head coach of Segunda División club, Polideportivo Ejido. In the 2004–05 Segunda División, he helped the El Ejido-based club to secure the 13th position in the league table with 52 points from 12 wins and 16 draws and in the 2005–06 Segunda División his club secured the 15th position in the league table with 53 points from 15 wins and 8 draws, thus ending his two-year stay at the club.

=== Raja Casablanca ===
He moved back to his home country Morocco where he was appointed as the assistant coach (to Spanish coach Paco Fortes) of the region's topmost club, Raja Casablanca. In his one-year stay at the Casablanca-based club, he along with his senior Paco Fortes lead the club to its first Arab Champions League title in 2006 when his side defeated ENPPI Club of Egypt 3-1 on aggregate in the finals.

=== Fath Union Sport ===
His return to Morocco and the huge achievement with Raja Casablanca saw him being appointed as the head coach and also the technical director of his parent club, Fath Union Sport in 2007. However, the emotional return was not a very successful one for both the club and the Spanish manager as the Rabat-based club was relegated to Botola 2 as the finished in the relegation zone at the 15th position with 26 points from 4 wins and 14 draws in the 2007–08 Botola.

=== Las Norias C.F. ===
In 2008, he returned to Spain where he was appointed as the head coach of Las Norias C.F.

=== US Témara ===
The year 2009 saw the Morocco-born returning to his home country where he was appointed as the head coach of Botola 2 club, US Témara. He helped the club secure the 13th position with 39 points from 8 wins and 15 draws in the 2010–11 GNF 2 (also known as Botola 2).

=== Al-Tali'aa ===
In 2012, he again moved out of Spain and this time to the Middle East and more accurately to Oman where he signed a one-year contract with Oman Elite League club, Al-Tali'aa SC in September 2012 before the beginning of the 2012–13 Oman Elite League.

=== Fanja ===
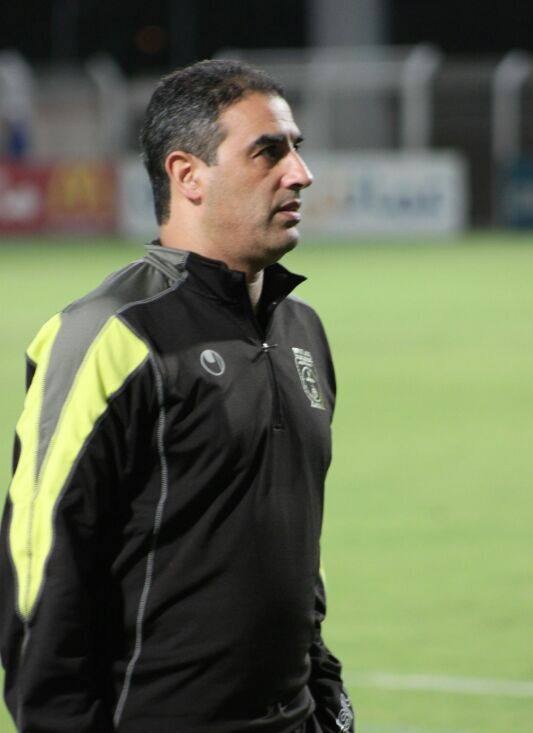
Hicham Jadrane - Fanja SC

In March 2013, 2011–12 Oman Elite League winners, Fanja SC appointed him as the head coach of the club for the rest of the 2012-13 season and also for the inaugural season of Oman Professional League in 2013-14. In his very first season at the Muscat-based club, he helped them secure the runners-up position in the 2012–13 Oman Elite League as his side lost 3-1 against Al-Suwaiq Club in the Championship Play-off (both the clubs finished with 50 points at the end of the season), hence helping them to qualify for the 2014 AFC Cup. Before the beginning of the inaugural season of Oman Professional League, he and his club were very lucky as they got the services of 12 international players who had and are representing Oman in various international competitions. His first match in-charge of the club in the 2013-14 Oman Professional League ended on a disappointing note as his side was held to a 1-1 draw by 2011–12 Oman Elite League runners-up, Al-Shabab Club. Soon after the match, he was criticized by the fans for not packing his squad with senior players available in the club. Later in the second week of the league, his side hosted newly promoted side Al-Ittihad at the Al-Seeb Stadium and the Morocco-born coach's side well silenced the criticizers as they registered an authoritative 4-2 win over Salalah-based club. The Morocco-born Spanish coach soon became a media star in Oman due to his impressive performances with the club, which included a 5-0 victor over Majees SC and qualification for the 2013 AFC Cup.

In his first ever appearance in an Asian Football Confederation tournament as the head coach of any club, the 2013 AFC Cup, he began his campaign in the third week of the tournament in a 1-0 loss against Erbil SC of Iraq. After their first loss in the 2013 edition of the AFC Cup, they next faced the Iraqi side in a home match at Al-Seeb Stadium. The visitors shocked the Omani side as the posted a 4-0 victory over Fanja. His side next faced Al-Ansar SC of Lebanon away at the Camille Chamoun Sports City Stadium, Beirut, whom they had previously defeated 4-0 at home under Omani coach Mohsin Al-Kharusi. The Lebanese side managed to hold the 2011–12 Oman Elite League winners to a 0-0 draw. His side faced Al-Ahli Taizz S.C. in their final encounter of the group stage and recorded a 3-1 victory over the Yemeni side thus securing a spot in the Round of 16. In the knockout stage, his side were sorted with a tough opponent, Al-Qadsia SC and as expected the home team secured a 4-0 victory over the Omani side thus eliminating Hicham Jardrane's side from contention.

In his second consecutive appearance in an Asian Football Confederation tournament as the head coach of any club, the 2014 AFC Cup, he faced a tough competition as his side was drawn with 2012 and 2013 AFC Cup winners, Kuwait SC. In his first AFC Cup match on 26 February 2014 against Syrian club Al-Jaish SC, his side disappointed the whole of nation as they were held to a 0-0 draw against a comparatively lower-leveled side. In their second Group B fixture against defending champions Kuwait SC, Fanja stunned many as they posted a 2-1 victory over the Kuwaiti side. They next faced Nejmeh SC of Lebanon in an away match but the visitors failed to even get a point from the tie as the Lebanese side secured a 1-0 victory over Fanja SC. In their next encounter against the same Lebanese side at home, Fanja managed to secure a point as the match ended in a 0-0 draw at Al-Seeb Stadium. On 5 April 2013, Hicham's side faced relegation threatened Sohar SC in an OPL match at the Sohar Regional Sports Complex and the Spanish coach's side had to face a 1-0 loss against the home side. On 6 April 2013, Hicham stepped down as the head coach of Fanja SC citing medical reasons but the football pundits in Oman claimed that this resignation came as a result of the club's 1-0 loss against Sohar SC.

=== Al-Nahda ===
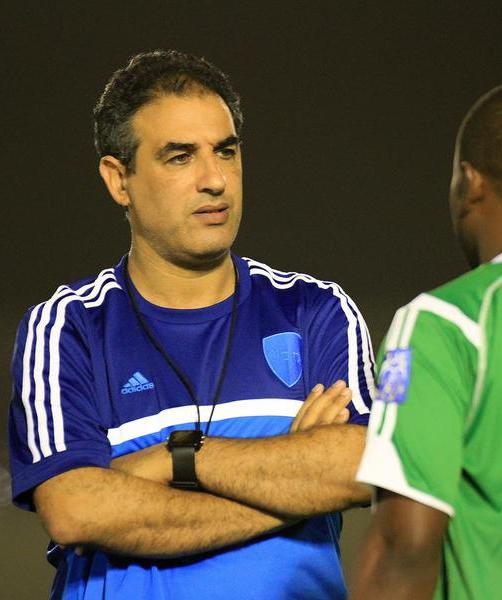
Hicham Jadrane - Al-Nahda Club

Al-Nahda Club

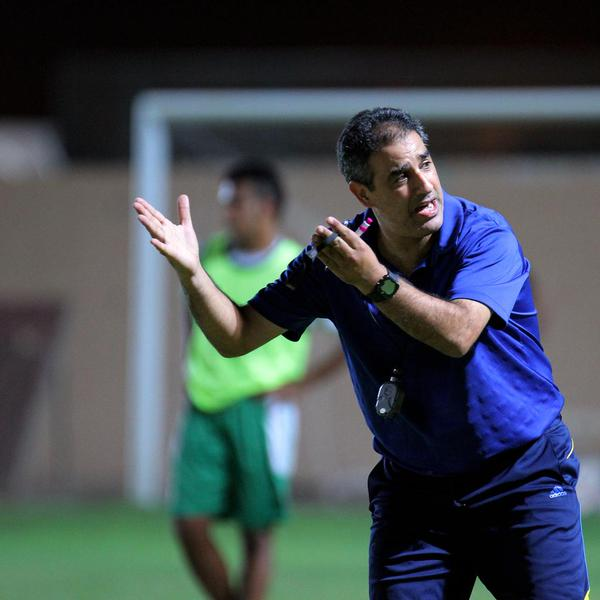

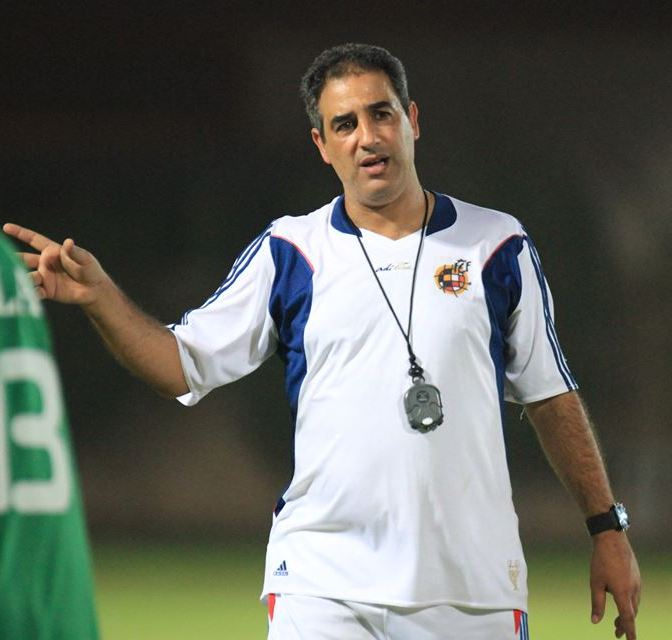

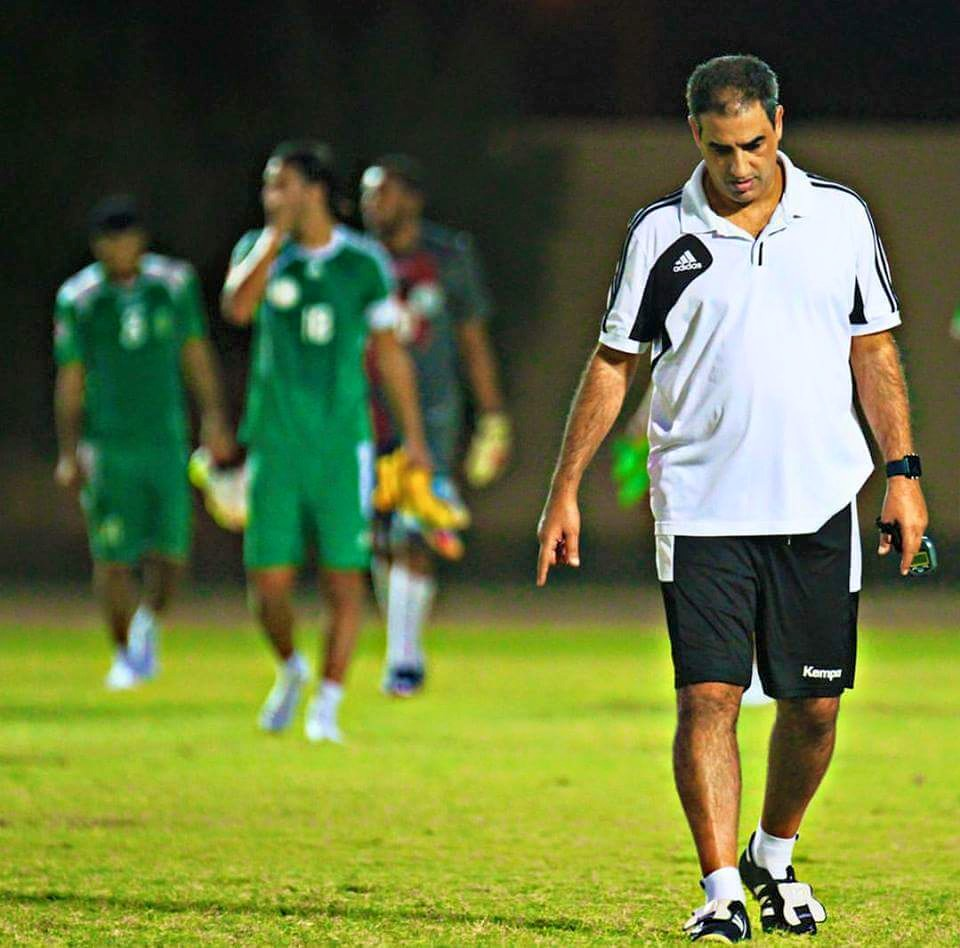

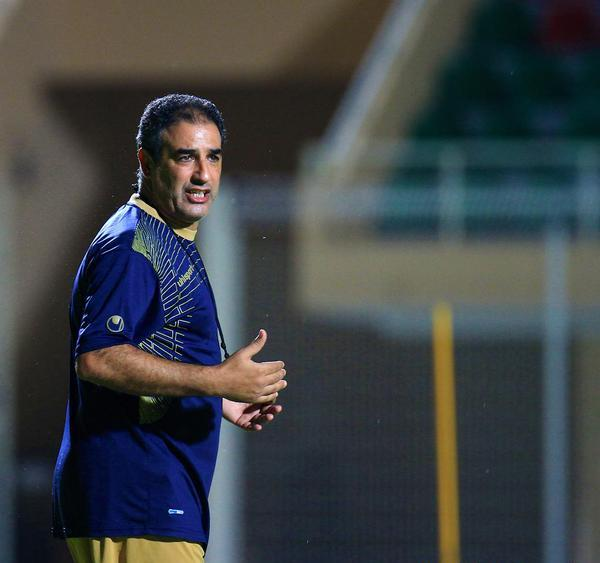

In June 2015, news speculated that Hicham will return to the Middle East and more accurately to Oman where he would coach Omani giants, Dhofar S.C.S.C. for the 2015–16 Oman Professional League season. However, this deal failed to materialize and as a result he was appointed as the manager of Al-Buraimi-based Al-Nahda Club. On 21 July 2015, he signed a one-year contract to be appointed as the manager of Al-Nahda Club. His club began the 2015-16 Oman Professional League campaign on a disappointing note as they faced a huge upset from lower-level side, Al-Musannah SC as they lost 2-1 in their home at the Al-Buraimi Sports Complex.

=== Buildcon Football Club ===
In February 2017, Hicham Jadrane Chazouani engaged with the club of Zambian Superleague Buildcon Football Club. It's his second experience in Africa after Morocco.

=== Al-Shamal SC ===
On July 6, 2018, Hicham Jadrane signed in the Qatari club of Al-Shamal SC.

=== Al-Markhiya SC ===
In April 2023 he joined Qatar Stars League club Al-Markhiya SC.

== Administrative roles ==
Hicham, besides being a football manager, is also a football lecturer, football pundit and a commentator. In 2004, he worked as a football pundit for TV Almería. In 2009, he worked as a football pundit in SNRT Maroc and recently was the commentator for the 2014 FIFA Club World Cup finals between Real Madrid C.F. and San Lorenzo de Almagro which was played in the Stade de Marrakech, Marrakesh.

== Achievements as manager ==
=== Honors ===
- With La Mojonera
- Primera División de Andalucía (2):

- Winners 2000-01

- With Polideportivo Ejido
- Primera División de Andalucía (2):

- Winners 2003-04, 2004-05

- With Raja Casablanca (Assistant)
- Arab Champions League (1):

- Winners 2005-06

- With Fanja
- Oman Elite League (0):

- Runners-up 2012-13

- Oman Super Cup (0):

- Runners-up 2013

=== Individual ===
- Andalusia Football Federation: Best Coach (2004–05) - Silver Medal
- Best coach of Zambia Super League 2017
