= Al-Markhiya SC =

Multi-sports club in Qatar

Al-Markhiya S.C.
- Full name: Al-Markhiya Sports Club
- Nickname: Al-Hazm
- Founded: 1995; 31 years ago
- Ground: Al-Markhiya Stadium, Doha
- Capacity: 450
- Chairman: Ali Al Musaifri
- Head coach: Sultan Al-Musaifri
- League: Qatari Second Division
- 2024–25: 2nd
- Website: almarkhiyasc.qa
Home colours	Away colours

Al-Markhiya Sports Club (Arabic: المرخية) is a Qatari multi-sports club, based in the Al Markhiya district of Doha. Its football department plays in the Qatar Stars League. It was widely regarded as the fastest improving team due to it winning the Second Division league 4 times in the first 5 it has taken part of. It has also entered history by being the first second division club to be promoted to the Qatar Stars League. The club was founded in 1995 as Al-Ittifaq, but was renamed to Al-Markhiya in 2004 to better represent the district where it is located, Al-Markhiya.

== Honours ==
=== Domestic ===
- Qatari Second Division
  - Champions (6): 1995, 1996, 1997, 1999, 2017, 2022

== Stadium ==
Built in 1995, the Al-Markhiya Stadium covers 70,000 m^{2} and features a football pitch with a capacity for 200 people, locker rooms and an administrative office. However, due to its insufficient capacity and facilities, the club frequently uses Saoud bin Abdulrahman Stadium as its homegrounds.

== Crest ==
A new club crest was unveiled in a public ceremony in May 2023. Designed by Qatari entrepreneur Fatima Al Kuwari, the logo features an oryx, the national animal of Qatar, and maroon coloring, a color associated with the country's flag.

== Technical and administrative staff ==
As of 18 October 2023

Name	Role
(United States) Anthony Hudson	Technical director
(Algeria) Sultan Al-Musaifri	Head coach
(Bulgaria) Yasin Mishaui	Assistant coach
(Netherlands) Henk Duut	Assistant coach
(Oman) Badar Al-Maimani	Assistant coach
(Brazil) Ricardo Andrade	Goalkeeper coach
(Qatar) Yassin Grill	Data analyst
(Brazil) Gustavo Silva	Fitness instructor

== Current squad ==
As of Qatari Second Division:

Note: Flags indicate national team as defined under FIFA eligibility rules; some limited exceptions apply. Players may hold more than one non-FIFA nationality.

No.	Pos.	Nation	Player
1	GK	QAT	Osama Adel
3	DF	QAT	Noor Rahman
4	DF	ALG	Abdelghani Lallam
5	MF	BEN	Salmane Salmane
6	DF	QAT	Mohamed Soltani
7	MF	EGY	Ahmed Aboutrika
8	MF	ALG	Sofyan Cola
9	FW	URU	Esteban Crucci
10	MF	QAT	Abdulaziz Mohammed (on loan from Al-Duhail)
11	FW	QAT	Rami Suhail
13	GK	QAT	Mohammed Al-Qadri
14	DF	QAT	Ahmed Abu Shanab
15	MF	QAT	Talal Muneer
16	DF	QAT	Ibrahim Elsadig

No.	Pos.	Nation	Player
17	MF	QAT	Nasser Al-Nasr
18	MF	QAT	Faisal Azadi
19	DF	QAT	Mohamed Tarkhan
20	FW	GAM	Yusupha Njie
24	MF	ESP	Roger Martínez
27	DF	RUS	Ivan Surkov
28	DF	ALG	Fouad Hanfoug
30	MF	QAT	Yousef Salman
33	GK	GER	Robert Kwasigroch
44	MF	QAT	Mahdi Salem
55	FW	QAT	Abdulgadir Ilyas Bakur
77	FW	MAR	Hamza Sanhaji
80	MF	TUN	Youssef Aouida
—	FW	CMR	Ayuck Cosmas (on loan from Al-Gharafa)

== List of managers ==
- (Somalia) Hassan Afif (2001–02)
- (Qatar) Eid Mubarak (2002)
- (Somalia) Hassan Afif (2002–03)
- (Egypt) Talha Ashraf (2004–05)
- (Somalia) Hassan Afif (caretaker) (2005) ^{1}
- (Egypt) Talha Ashraf (2005)
- (Somalia) Hassan Afif (2006–07)
- (Iraq) Saad Hafez (2007)
- (Ghana) Karim Abdul Razak (2007–08)
- (Somalia) Hassan Afif (2008)
- (Egypt) Talha Ashraf (2008)
- (Egypt) Fareed Ramzi (2008)
- (Brazil) Luis Fernando (2009)
- (Brazil) Luizinho (2009)
- (Canada) Omar Meziane (2010)
- (Egypt) Ayman Mansour (2010–11)
- (Sudan) Osama Siksik (caretaker) (2011)
- (Egypt) Talha Ashraf (2011–12)
- (Slovakia) Peter Polák (2012–13)
- (Sudan) Osama Siksik (caretaker) (2013–14)
- (Ghana) Karim Abdul Razak (2014)
- (Brazil) Luizinho (2014–15)
- (Egypt) Ayman Mansour (2015–2016)
- (Netherlands) Silvio Diliberto (2016–2017)
- (Qatar) Yousuf Adam (Aug 2017–Sep 2017)
- (Egypt) Ayman Mansour (Sep 2017–Oct 2017)
- (Qatar) Yousuf Adam (Oct 2017–Feb 2018)
- (Tunisia) Adel Sellimi (Feb 2018–May 2018)
- (Morocco) Hisham Zahid (2019)
- (Qatar) Younes Ali (2019–Aug 2020)
- (England) Omar Najhi (2020–2021)
- (Sudan) Mohamed Ali Yousif (2021)
- (Qatar) Abdullah Mubarak (2021–Apr 16, 2023)
- (Morocco) Hicham Jadrane (Apr 17, 2023–Jun 2023)
- (England) Anthony Hudson (Jun 2023–Oct 2023)
- (Algeria) Madjid Bougherra (Oct 2023–Jun 2024)
- (Qatar) Sultan Al-Musaifri (Jul 2024–present)

Notes

- Hassan Afif served as caretaker coach while Talha Ashraf was on emergency leave due to family matters.
