= 2022 Amir of Qatar Cup =

Amir Cup 2022 (Qatar)
Tournament details
- Country: Qatar
- Dates: 13 February 2022–18 March 2022
- Teams: 16

Final positions
- Champions: Al-Duhail SC
- Runners-up: Al-Gharafa SC

Tournament statistics
- Matches played: 15
- Goals scored: 58 (3.87 per match)
- Top goal scorer: Two players (3 goals each)

The 2022 Amir of Qatar Cup (named Amir Cup since 2019) was the 50th edition of the Qatari cup tournament in men's football. It was played by the first and second level divisions of the Qatari football league structure. Al-Duhail SC defeated Al-Gharafa 5–1 in the final.

== Round of 16 ==
13 February 2022	Al Sadd SC	1–0	Muaither	Doha
16:40	Abdurisag 13'	Report		Stadium: Grand Hamad Stadium; Referee: Mohammed Al-Sherif

13 February 2022	Qatar SC	2–1	Al-Shamal SC	Doha
19:30	Benlamri 26'; Al-Yahyaei (yellow card) 46'; Resan 68' (Benlamri); Al Bustami (yellow card) 78'; Y. Mohammed (yellow card) 90+5'	Report	Mitwali (yellow card) 38'; Jeddo 40' (Olwan); Mohamed (yellow card) 55'; De Nooijer (yellow card) 80'; Nani (yellow card) 90+3'; Attwan (yellow card) 90+6'	Stadium: Grand Hamad Stadium; Referee: Youssef Al sharshani

14 February 2022	Al Ahli	3–0	Al Markhiya	Doha
16:40	Al Hasia (yellow card) 7'; Pozo 15' (Al-Naimat); Al-Harazi 18' (Al-Naimat); Palang 62' (Pozo)	Report	Al Yahmadi (yellow card) 42'; Al Yazidi (yellow card) 60'	Stadium: Jassim bin Hamad Stadium; Referee: Mohammed Al Obedly

14 February 2022	Al-Arabi	0–2	Al-Sailiya SC	Doha
19:30	Diomande (yellow card) 17'; Ilyas (yellow card) 77'	Report	Bwalya 32' (pen.); Muddather (yellow card) 45+3'; Al-Shammeri (yellow card) 45+3'; Haddaf (yellow card) 50'; Khamdamov 63'; Lecomte (yellow card) 86'	Stadium: Jassim bin Hamad Stadium; Referee: Khalid Nabet

15 February 2022	Al-Duhail	4–2	Al-Khor	Doha
16:40	Almoez Ali 9'; Nam Tae-hee 18', 64'; Moustafa 41'	Report	Brahmi 52'; Al-Habsi 78'	Stadium: Thani bin Jassim Stadium; Referee: Sultan Al Sharshani

15 February 2022	Al-Rayyan SC	1–0	Umm Salal SC	Doha
19:30	Malolah (yellow card) 45+5'; Brahimi (yellow card) 66'; Khalilzadeh (yellow card) 75'; Al-Hadhrami (yellow card) 78'; Rodríguez	Report	Al-Sulaimane (yellow card) 36' al-Bakhit (red card) 45+2'; Al-Rashidi (yellow card) 67'; Ababacar (yellow card) 71'; Abdennour (yellow card) 75'	Stadium: Thani bin Jassim Stadium; Referee: Meshari Al Shammari

16 February 2022	Al-Gharafa SC	4–0	Al Kharaitiyat SC	Doha
16:40	Mukhtar (yellow card) 12'; Abdelhay 30' (o.g.); Hanni 45+3'; Tahrat (yellow card) 71'; Alaaeldin 82' 88' (Hanni)	Report		Stadium: Grand Hamad Stadium; Referee: Abdulrahman Al Jassim

16 February 2022	Al-Wakrah SC	3–1	Al Shahaniya SC	Doha
19:30	O. Ali 20' (Lafrid) 66' (Al Yazidi); Mesmoudi (yellow card) 60'; Al Yazidi 81' (Lafrid); Ibrahim (yellow card) 89'	Report	Vázquez (yellow card) 14'; Al-Yahri (yellow card) 57'; Obaid (yellow card) 70'; Al-Fayhani 90+3' (Salhi)	Stadium: Grand Hamad Stadium; Referee: Khamis Al Marri

== Quarter-finals ==
5 March 2022	Al Sadd SC	4–0	Al-Ahli	Doha
16:50	Hassan 3'; Ayew 5'; Tabata 75'; Akram Afif 78'	Report		Stadium: Jassim Bin Hamad Stadium; Referee: Saoud Al Athbah

5 March 2022	Al-Rayyan	3–3 (a.e.t.) (4–5 p)	Al-Wakrah	Doha
19:45	Gelson 45+3' (o.g.); Boli 45+5', 68'	Report	Omar Ali 39'; Benyettou 42'; Ebrahimi 54'	Stadium: Jassim Bin Hamad Stadium; Referee: Abdullah Al Athbah
	Penalties
	Yacine Brahimi (penalty scored); Hashim Ali (penalty scored); Steven Nzonzi (penalty missed); Yohan Boli (penalty scored); Ali Malolah (penalty scored)		(penalty scored) Omar Ali; (penalty scored) Mohamed Benyettou; (penalty scored) Omid Ebrahimi; (penalty scored) Gelson Dala; (penalty scored) Murad Naji

6 March 2022	Al-Sailiya	1–4	Al-Duhail	Doha
16:50	Bwalya 54'	Report	Alderweireld 12'; Mohammad 34'; Moustafa 57'; Boudiaf 76'	Stadium: Grand Hamad Stadium; Referee: Mohammed Al-Shammari

6 March 2022	Qatar SC	1–2	Al-Gharafa	Doha
19:45	Martínez 57'	Report	Surag 24'; Hanni 64'	Stadium: Grand Hamad Stadium; Referee: Salman Ahmad Flahi

== Semi-finals ==
14 March 2022	Al Sadd SC	2–3	Al-Duhail	Doha
19:45	Ayew 33'; Bounedjah 90'	Report	Sassi 7', 80'; Olunga 44'	Stadium: Jassim Bin Hamad Stadium; Referee: Salman Ahmad Flahi

14 March 2022	Al-Gharafa	4–1	Al-Wakrah	Doha
17:00	Gabriel 8'; Diabaté 40', 57'; Homam Ahmed 68'	Report	Gelson 36'	Stadium: Jassim Bin Hamad Stadium; Referee: Saoud Al Athbah

== Final ==
18 March 2022	Al-Duhail	5–1	Al-Gharafa	Doha
19:45	Edmilson Junior 5'; Olunga 18'; Ali 52'; Sassi 58'; Moustafa 85'	Report	Alaaeldin 53'	Stadium: Khalifa International Stadium; Referee: Abdulhadi Al Ruaile

== Top goalscorers ==
Rank	Player	Club	Goals
1	(Ghana) Omar Ali	Al-Wakrah	3
1	(Tunisia) Ferjani Sassi	Al-Duhail	3
3	(Qatar) Ahmed Alaaeldin	Al-Gharafa	2
3	(South Korea) Nam Tae-hee	Al-Duhail	2
3	(Algeria) Sofiane Hanni	Al-Gharafa	2
3	(Democratic Republic of the Congo) Walter Bwalya	Al-Sailiya	2
3	(Ivory Coast) Yohan Boli	Al-Rayyan	2
3	(Qatar) Abdelrahman Moustafa	Al-Duhail	2
3	(Kenya) Michael Olunga	Al-Duhail	2
