= 26th Arabian Gulf Cup squads =

List of footballers

Below are the squads for the 26th Arabian Gulf Cup, which took place in Kuwait from 21 December 2024 to 3 January 2025.

The eight national teams involved in the tournament were required to register a squad with a minimum of 18 players and a maximum of 26 players, at least three of whom had to be goalkeepers. Only players in these squads were eligible to take part in the tournament.

The age listed for each player is as of 21 December 2024, the first day of the tournament. The numbers of caps and goals listed for each player do not include any matches played after the start of the tournament. The nationality for each club reflects the national association (not the league) to which the club is affiliated. The club listed is the last club where the player concerned plays a competitive match before the tournament. A flag is included for coaches that are of a different nationality than their own national team.

== Group A ==
=== Kuwait ===
Kuwait announced a 30-man preliminary list on 24 November 2024. The final squad was announced on 16 December.

Head coach: (Spain) Juan Antonio Pizzi

No.	Pos.	Player	Date of birth (age)	Caps	Goals	Club
1	GK	Khaled Al-Rashidi	20 April 1987 (aged 37)	27	0	(Kuwait Football Association) Al-Qadsia
2	DF	Sami Al-Sanea	9 January 1993 (aged 31)	28	1	(Kuwait Football Association) Al-Kuwait
3	DF	Meshari Ghanem	15 September 1998 (aged 26)	17	0	(Kuwait Football Association) Al-Kuwait
4	DF	Khalid El Ebrahim	28 August 1992 (aged 32)	50	3	(Kuwait Football Association) Al-Qadsia
5	DF	Fahad Al-Hajeri	10 November 1991 (aged 33)	88	6	(Kuwait Football Association) Al-Kuwait
6	MF	Sultan Al-Enezi	29 September 1992 (aged 32)	60	0	(Oman Football Association) Dhofar
7	FW	Mohammad Daham	17 February 2000 (aged 24)	20	5	(Kuwait Football Association) Al-Kuwait
8	MF	Ahmed Al-Dhefiri	9 January 1992 (aged 32)	65	5	(Kuwait Football Association) Al-Kuwait
9	FW	Bandar Bouresli	1 January 1996 (aged 28)	6	0	(Kuwait Football Association) Kazma
10	MF	Faisal Zayid	9 October 1991 (aged 33)	65	7	(Kuwait Football Association) Al-Kuwait
11	MF	Eid Al-Rashidi	25 May 1999 (aged 25)	46	3	(Kuwait Football Association) Al-Qadsia
12	DF	Hamad Al-Harbi	25 July 1992 (aged 32)	38	0	(Kuwait Football Association) Kazma
13	DF	Rashed Al-Dousari	18 July 2000 (aged 24)	15	0	(Kuwait Football Association) Al-Qadsia
14	MF	Redha Hani	22 April 1996 (aged 28)	39	1	(Kuwait Football Association) Al-Kuwait
15	FW	Yousef Majed	14 January 2005 (aged 19)	6	0	(Kuwait Football Association) Al-Arabi
16	MF	Mobarak Al-Faneeni	21 January 2000 (aged 24)	33	5	(Kuwait Football Association) Al-Qadsia
17	FW	Ali Khalaf	16 January 1995 (aged 29)	18	1	(Kuwait Football Association) Al-Arabi
18	MF	Fawaz Ayedh	21 February 1997 (aged 27)	30	1	(Kuwait Football Association) Al-Salmiya
19	MF	Muath Al-Enezi	16 July 2003 (aged 21)	6	0	(Kuwait Football Association) Al-Salmiya
20	FW	Yousef Nasser (captain)	9 October 1990 (aged 34)	114	52	(Kuwait Football Association) Al-Kuwait
21	DF	Hassan Al-Enezi	1 September 2000 (aged 24)	22	1	(Kuwait Football Association) Al-Arabi
22	GK	Sulaiman Abdulghafour	26 February 1991 (aged 33)	47	0	(Kuwait Football Association) Al-Arabi
23	GK	Abdulrahman Al-Fadhli	23 March 2001 (aged 23)	0	0	(Kuwait Football Association) Al-Salmiya
24	DF	Nasser Khader	14 October 2003 (aged 21)	0	0	(Kuwait Football Association) Al-Nasr
25	DF	Muath Al-Dhefiri	20 May 1997 (aged 27)	4	0	(Kuwait Football Association) Al-Qadsia
26	FW	Salman Al-Awadhi	21 May 2001 (aged 23)	12	1	(Kuwait Football Association) Al-Arabi

=== Oman ===
Oman announced a 31-man preliminary squad on 9 December 2024. The final squad was announced on 18 December.

Head coach: Rashid Jaber

No.	Pos.	Player	Date of birth (age)	Caps	Goals	Club
1	GK	Ibrahim Al-Mukhaini	20 June 1997 (aged 27)	37	0	(Oman Football Association) Al-Nahda
2	DF	Mohammed Al-Musalami	27 April 1990 (aged 34)	122	3	(Oman Football Association) Al-Seeb
3	DF	Mulham Al-Sinaidi	15 March 2002 (aged 22)	0	0	(Oman Football Association) Al-Nasr
4	MF	Arshad Al-Alawi	12 April 2000 (aged 24)	51	7	(Oman Football Association) Al-Seeb
5	DF	Ghanim Al-Habashi	4 August 1998 (aged 26)	2	0	(Oman Football Association) Al-Nahda
6	DF	Ahmed Al-Khamisi	26 November 1991 (aged 33)	52	0	(Oman Football Association) Al-Seeb
7	FW	Issam Al-Sabhi	1 May 1997 (aged 27)	50	11	(Oman Football Association) Al-Shabab
8	MF	Zahir Al-Aghbari	28 May 1999 (aged 25)	48	0	(Oman Football Association) Al-Seeb
9	MF	Ahed Al-Mashaiki	30 May 2003 (aged 21)	0	0	(Oman Football Association) Al-Nahda
10	MF	Jameel Al-Yahmadi	27 July 1996 (aged 28)	77	4	(Oman Football Association) Al-Seeb
11	DF	Amjad Al-Harthi	1 January 1994 (aged 30)	31	1	(Oman Football Association) Al-Seeb
12	MF	Abdullah Fawaz	3 October 1996 (aged 28)	48	7	(Oman Football Association) Al-Nahda
13	DF	Thani Al-Rushaidi	16 March 1995 (aged 29)	2	0	(Oman Football Association) Al-Nahda
14	DF	Ahmed Al-Kaabi	15 September 1996 (aged 28)	41	0	(Oman Football Association) Al-Nahda
15	FW	Rabia Al-Alawi	31 March 1995 (aged 29)	13	5	(Oman Football Association) Oman SC
16	DF	Khalid Al-Braiki	3 July 1993 (aged 31)	43	1	(Oman Football Association) Al-Shabab
17	DF	Ali Al-Busaidi	21 March 1991 (aged 33)	94	2	(Oman Football Association) Al-Seeb
18	GK	Faiz Al-Rushaidi (captain)	19 July 1988 (aged 36)	74	0	(Oman Football Association) Sohar
19	MF	Mataz Saleh	28 May 1996 (aged 28)	27	3	(Oman Football Association) Al-Seeb
20	MF	Salaah Al-Yahyaei	17 August 1998 (aged 26)	61	9	(Bahrain Football Association) Al-Khaldiya
21	FW	Abdulrahman Al-Mushaifri	16 August 1998 (aged 26)	21	6	(Oman Football Association) Al-Seeb
22	GK	Ibrahim Al-Rajhi	5 October 2000 (aged 24)	0	0	(Oman Football Association) Al-Nasr
23	MF	Harib Al-Saadi	1 February 1990 (aged 34)	99	1	(Oman Football Association) Al-Nahda
24	MF	Hussein Al-Shahri	26 December 2002 (aged 21)	0	0	(Oman Football Association) Al-Nahda
25	FW	Faraj Al-Kiyumi	17 July 2001 (aged 23)	0	0	(Oman Football Association) Al-Khaburah
26	FW	Abdulsalam Al-Shukaili	25 April 1996 (aged 28)	0	0	(Oman Football Association) Bahla

=== Qatar ===
Qatar announced their 29-man preliminary list on 11 December 2024. The final squad was announced on 19 December.

Head coach: (Spain) Luis García

No.	Pos.	Player	Date of birth (age)	Caps	Goals	Club
1	GK	Salah Zakaria	24 April 1999 (aged 25)	8	0	(Qatar Football Association) Al-Duhail
2	DF	Abdalla Yousif	10 April 2002 (aged 22)	1	0	(Qatar Football Association) Al-Gharafa
3	DF	Abdelaziz Mitwali	20 March 1996 (aged 28)	0	0	(Qatar Football Association) Al-Wakrah
4	DF	Al-Hashmi Al-Hussain	15 August 2003 (aged 21)	1	0	(Royal Spanish Football Federation) Alcorcón
5	DF	Tarek Salman	5 December 1997 (aged 27)	85	0	(Qatar Football Association) Al-Sadd
6	MF	Ahmed Fathy	25 January 1993 (aged 31)	39	0	(Qatar Football Association) Al-Arabi
7	FW	Ahmed Al-Rawi	30 May 2004 (aged 20)	6	2	(Qatar Football Association) Al-Rayyan
8	MF	Jassem Gaber	20 February 2002 (aged 22)	27	1	(Qatar Football Association) Al-Arabi
9	FW	Mohammed Muntari	20 December 1993 (aged 31)	62	15	(Qatar Football Association) Al-Gharafa
10	FW	Akram Afif (captain)	18 November 1996 (aged 28)	118	38	(Qatar Football Association) Al-Sadd
11	FW	Yusuf Abdurisag	6 August 1999 (aged 25)	36	3	(Qatar Football Association) Al-Sadd
12	DF	Lucas Mendes	3 July 1990 (aged 34)	16	1	(Qatar Football Association) Al-Wakrah
13	MF	Ibrahim Al-Hassan	26 October 2005 (aged 19)	8	2	(Royal Spanish Football Federation) Calahorra
14	DF	Homam Ahmed	25 August 1999 (aged 25)	59	3	(Qatar Football Association) Al-Duhail
15	MF	Rabh Boussafi	18 May 2000 (aged 24)	0	0	(Qatar Football Association) Al-Gharafa
16	DF	Bahaa Ellethy	19 April 1999 (aged 25)	0	0	(Qatar Football Association) Al Ahli
17	MF	Abdelrahman Moustafa	5 April 1997 (aged 27)	7	0	(Qatar Football Association) Al Ahli
18	DF	Sultan Al-Brake	7 April 1996 (aged 28)	8	0	(Qatar Football Association) Al-Duhail
19	FW	Almoez Ali	19 August 1996 (aged 28)	118	59	(Qatar Football Association) Al-Duhail
20	MF	Abdullah Al-Ahrak	10 May 1997 (aged 27)	33	1	(Qatar Football Association) Al-Duhail
21	GK	Marwan Badreldin	15 April 1999 (aged 25)	0	0	(Qatar Football Association) Al-Ahli
22	GK	Meshaal Barsham	14 February 1998 (aged 26)	49	0	(Qatar Football Association) Al-Sadd
23	MF	Assim Madibo	22 October 1996 (aged 28)	43	0	(Qatar Football Association) Al-Gharafa
24	MF	Mostafa Meshaal	28 March 2001 (aged 23)	21	2	(Qatar Football Association) Al-Sadd
25	FW	Mohamed Khaled Gouda	26 January 2005 (aged 19)	2	0	(Royal Spanish Football Federation) Calahorra
26	MF	Mubarak Shanan	20 February 2004 (aged 20)	0	0	(Qatar Football Association) Al-Duhail

=== United Arab Emirates ===
United Arab Emirates announced their final squad on 14 December 2024.

Head coach: (Portugal) Paulo Bento

No.	Pos.	Player	Date of birth (age)	Caps	Goals	Club
1	GK	Ali Khasif	9 June 1987 (aged 37)	72	0	(United Arab Emirates Football Association) Al Jazira
2	DF	Abdulla Idrees	16 August 1999 (aged 25)	19	0	(United Arab Emirates Football Association) Al Jazira
3	DF	Zayed Sultan	11 April 2001 (aged 23)	13	1	(United Arab Emirates Football Association) Al Jazira
4	DF	Kouame Autonne	22 September 2000 (aged 24)	5	0	(United Arab Emirates Football Association) Al Ain
5	DF	Lucas Pimenta	17 July 2000 (aged 24)	0	0	(United Arab Emirates Football Association) Al Wahda
6	MF	Majid Rashid	16 May 2000 (aged 24)	19	0	(United Arab Emirates Football Association) Sharjah
8	MF	Tahnoon Al-Zaabi	10 April 1999 (aged 25)	35	1	(United Arab Emirates Football Association) Al Wahda
7	FW	Bruno de Oliveira	10 June 2001 (aged 23)	4	0	(United Arab Emirates Football Association) Al Jazira
9	FW	Harib Abdalla	26 November 2002 (aged 22)	32	7	(United Arab Emirates Football Association) Shabab Al Ahli
10	FW	Fábio Lima	30 June 1993 (aged 31)	33	16	(United Arab Emirates Football Association) Al Wasl
11	FW	Caio Canedo	9 August 1990 (aged 34)	49	9	(United Arab Emirates Football Association) Al Wasl
12	DF	Khalifa Al Hammadi	7 November 1998 (aged 26)	49	2	(United Arab Emirates Football Association) Al Jazira
13	DF	Mohammed Al-Attas	5 August 1997 (aged 27)	31	1	(United Arab Emirates Football Association) Al Jazira
14	MF	Mohammed Abbas	30 September 2002 (aged 22)	7	0	(United Arab Emirates Football Association) Al Ain
15	MF	Yahia Nader	11 September 1998 (aged 26)	14	0	(United Arab Emirates Football Association) Al Ain
16	MF	Marcus Meloni	25 June 2000 (aged 24)	4	1	(United Arab Emirates Football Association) Sharjah
17	GK	Khalid Eisa (captain)	15 September 1989 (aged 35)	83	0	(United Arab Emirates Football Association) Al Ain
18	MF	Mackenzie Hunt	14 November 2001 (aged 23)	4	0	(The Football Association) Fleetwood Town
19	DF	Khaled Ibrahim	17 January 1997 (aged 27)	20	1	(United Arab Emirates Football Association) Sharjah
20	FW	Yahya Al Ghassani	18 April 1998 (aged 26)	25	7	(United Arab Emirates Football Association) Shabab Al Ahli
21	MF	Isam Faiz	6 March 2000 (aged 24)	7	0	(United Arab Emirates Football Association) Ajman
22	GK	Hamad Al-Meqbaali	13 July 2003 (aged 21)	0	0	(United Arab Emirates Football Association) Shabab Al Ahli
23	FW	Fahad Badr	9 March 2001 (aged 23)	3	0	(United Arab Emirates Football Association) Baniyas
24	MF	Solomon Sosu	5 March 2005 (aged 19)	0	0	(United Arab Emirates Football Association) Al Ain
25	DF	Khamis Al-Mansoori	15 January 2004 (aged 20)	0	0	(United Arab Emirates Football Association) Baniyas
26	DF	Faris Khalil	8 October 2000 (aged 24)	0	0	(United Arab Emirates Football Association) Al Wasl

== Group B ==
=== Bahrain ===
Bahrain announced their final squad on 17 December 2024.

Head coach: (Croatia) Dragan Talajić

No.	Pos.	Player	Date of birth (age)	Caps	Goals	Club
1	GK	Ammar Mohamed	10 February 1999 (aged 25)	3	0	(Bahrain Football Association) Al-Khaldiya
2	DF	Amine Benaddi	9 May 1993 (aged 31)	30	0	(Bahrain Football Association) Al-Muharraq
3	DF	Waleed Al Hayam	4 November 1988 (aged 36)	117	0	(Bahrain Football Association) Al-Muharraq
4	MF	Sayed Dhiya Saeed	17 July 1992 (aged 32)	119	8	(Bahrain Football Association) Al-Khaldiya
5	DF	Hamad Al-Shamsan	29 September 1997 (aged 27)	26	0	(Bahrain Football Association) Al-Riffa
6	MF	Ahmed Al-Sherooqi	22 May 2000 (aged 24)	6	0	(Bahrain Football Association) Al-Muharraq
7	MF	Ali Madan	30 November 1995 (aged 29)	94	13	(Bahrain Football Association) Al-Riffa
8	MF	Mohamed Marhoon	12 February 1998 (aged 26)	69	16	(Kuwait Football Association) Kuwait SC
9	MF	Ebrahim Al-Khattal	19 September 2000 (aged 24)	25	4	(Bahrain Football Association) Manama
10	MF	Abdulwahab Al-Malood	7 June 1990 (aged 34)	85	5	(Bahrain Football Association) Al-Muharraq
11	FW	Ismail Abdullatif	11 September 1986 (aged 38)	133	48	(Bahrain Football Association) Al-Khaldiya
12	FW	Mahdi Abduljabbar	25 June 1991 (aged 33)	39	12	(Bahrain Football Association) Manama
13	FW	Mohamed Al-Romaihi	9 September 1990 (aged 34)	46	16	(Bahrain Football Association) Al-Najma
14	MF	Abbas Al-Asfoor	2 February 1999 (aged 25)	16	0	(Bahrain Football Association) Al-Ahli
15	MF	Jasim Al-Shaikh	1 February 1996 (aged 28)	65	4	(Bahrain Football Association) Al-Riffa
16	DF	Sayed Baqer	14 April 1994 (aged 30)	39	2	(Bahrain Football Association) Al-Riffa
17	DF	Hazza Ali	9 June 1995 (aged 29)	12	0	(Bahrain Football Association) Al-Riffa
18	DF	Mohamed Adel	20 September 1996 (aged 28)	37	0	(Bahrain Football Association) Al-Khaldiya
19	MF	Kamil Al-Aswad (captain)	8 April 1994 (aged 30)	110	13	(Bahrain Football Association) Al-Riffa
20	MF	Mahdi Al-Humaidan	19 May 1993 (aged 31)	65	6	(Bahrain Football Association) Al-Khaldiya
21	GK	Sayed Mohammed Jaffer	25 August 1985 (aged 39)	152	0	(Bahrain Football Association) Al-Muharraq
22	GK	Ebrahim Lutfalla	24 September 1992 (aged 32)	26	0	(Bahrain Football Association) Al-Ahli
23	DF	Abdulla Al-Khulasi	2 September 2003 (aged 21)	13	1	(Bahrain Football Association) Al-Muharraq
24	DF	Vincent Emmanuel	29 April 2001 (aged 23)	6	0	(Bahrain Football Association) Sitra Club
25	MF	Sayed Al-Wadaei	8 July 2008 (aged 16)	0	0	(Royal Spanish Football Federation) Villarreal Youth
26	FW	Husain Abdulkarim	14 May 2002 (aged 22)	4	0	(Bahrain Football Association) Al-Muharraq

=== Iraq ===
Iraq announced their 35-man preliminary list on 3 December 2024. The squad was reduced to 27 players on 11 December. Zaid Tahseen replaced the injured Saad Abdul-Amir on 17 December. A day later, Merchas Doski withdrew due to club commitments and was replaced by Ahmed Maknzi. The final squad was announced on 19 December.

Head coach: (Spain) Jesús Casas

No.	Pos.	Player	Date of birth (age)	Caps	Goals	Club
1	GK	Kumel Al-Rekabe	19 August 2004 (aged 20)	0	0	(Royal Spanish Football Federation) Leganés B
2	DF	Rebin Sulaka	12 April 1992 (aged 32)	47	1	(Swiss Football Association) Schaffhausen
3	DF	Mohanad Jeahze	10 April 1997 (aged 27)	4	0	(Norwegian Football Federation) Lillestrøm
4	DF	Munaf Younis	16 November 1996 (aged 28)	20	1	(Iraq Football Association) Al-Shorta
5	DF	Ali Faez	9 September 1994 (aged 30)	49	4	(Iraq Football Association) Al-Najaf
6	DF	Ali Adnan	19 December 1993 (aged 31)	94	7	(Saudi Arabian Football Federation) Al-Najma
7	FW	Ali Yousif	19 January 1996 (aged 28)	2	0	(Iraq Football Association) Al-Zawraa
8	MF	Ibrahim Bayesh	1 May 2000 (aged 24)	60	7	(Saudi Arabian Football Federation) Al-Riyadh
9	MF	Ahmed Yasin	22 April 1991 (aged 33)	69	6	(Swedish Football Association) Örebro SK
10	FW	Mohanad Ali	20 June 2000 (aged 24)	53	20	(Iraq Football Association) Al-Shorta
11	MF	Zidane Iqbal	27 April 2003 (aged 21)	15	1	(Royal Dutch Football Association) Utrecht
12	GK	Jalal Hassan (captain)	18 May 1991 (aged 33)	87	0	(Iraq Football Association) Al-Zawraa
13	FW	Amin Al-Hamawi	17 December 2003 (aged 21)	2	0	(Swedish Football Association) Sandvikens IF
14	MF	Amjad Attwan	12 March 1997 (aged 27)	82	4	(Iraq Football Association) Zakho
15	DF	Mustafa Saadoon	25 May 2001 (aged 23)	7	0	(Iraq Football Association) Al-Quwa Al-Jawiya
16	MF	Amir Al-Ammari	27 July 1997 (aged 27)	35	2	(Polish Football Association) Cracovia
17	MF	Ali Jasim	20 January 2004 (aged 20)	19	2	(Italian Football Federation) Como
18	FW	Aymen Hussein	22 March 1996 (aged 28)	81	30	(Qatar Football Association) Al-Khor
19	MF	Youssef Amyn	21 August 2003 (aged 21)	15	2	(Saudi Arabian Football Federation) Al-Wehda
20	MF	Peter Gwargis	4 September 2000 (aged 24)	0	0	(Iraq Football Association) Duhok
21	MF	Marko Farji	16 March 2004 (aged 20)	0	0	(Norwegian Football Federation) Strømsgodset
22	GK	Mohammad Hassan	1 April 2002 (aged 22)	0	0	(Danish Football Association) Ishøj
23	DF	Ahmed Maknzi	24 September 2001 (aged 23)	0	0	(Iraq Football Association) Al-Najaf
24	DF	Adam Rasheed	10 July 2006 (aged 18)	0	0	(Football Association of Slovenia) Maribor
25	DF	Zaid Tahseen	29 January 2001 (aged 23)	15	1	(Iraq Football Association) Al-Quwa Al-Jawiya
26	MF	Lucas Shlimon	15 February 2003 (aged 21)	2	0	(Swedish Football Association) Örebro SK

=== Saudi Arabia ===
Saudi Arabia announced their 27-man preliminary list on 8 December 2024. Abdulelah Al-Amri wihdrew injured on 17 December and was replaced by Awn Al-Saluli and Saad Al-Mousa. The final squad was announced on 19 December. Later, Firas Al-Buraikan withdrew injured and was replaced by Marwan Al-Sahafi.

Head coach: (France) Hervé Renard

No.	Pos.	Player	Date of birth (age)	Caps	Goals	Club
1	GK	Nawaf Al-Aqidi	10 May 2000 (aged 24)	4	0	(Saudi Arabian Football Federation) Al-Nassr
2	DF	Sultan Al-Ghannam	6 May 1994 (aged 30)	34	0	(Saudi Arabian Football Federation) Al-Nassr
3	DF	Awn Al-Saluli	2 September 1998 (aged 26)	9	0	(Saudi Arabian Football Federation) Al-Taawoun
4	DF	Ali Lajami	24 April 1996 (aged 28)	15	1	(Saudi Arabian Football Federation) Al-Nassr
5	DF	Ali Al-Bulaihi	21 November 1989 (aged 35)	56	2	(Saudi Arabian Football Federation) Al-Hilal
6	MF	Nasser Al-Dawsari	19 December 1998 (aged 26)	26	0	(Saudi Arabian Football Federation) Al-Hilal
7	MF	Musab Al-Juwayr	20 June 2003 (aged 21)	11	3	(Saudi Arabian Football Federation) Al-Shabab
8	MF	Abdulellah Al-Malki	11 October 1994 (aged 30)	36	0	(Saudi Arabian Football Federation) Al-Ettifaq
9	FW	Marwan Al-Sahafi	17 February 2004 (aged 20)	4	0	(Royal Belgian Football Association) Beerschot
10	MF	Salem Al-Dawsari	19 August 1991 (aged 33)	90	23	(Saudi Arabian Football Federation) Al-Hilal
11	FW	Saleh Al-Shehri	1 November 1993 (aged 31)	38	15	(Saudi Arabian Football Federation) Al-Ittihad
12	DF	Muhannad Al-Shanqeeti	12 March 1999 (aged 25)	2	0	(Saudi Arabian Football Federation) Al-Ittihad
13	DF	Yasser Al-Shahrani	25 March 1992 (aged 32)	81	2	(Saudi Arabian Football Federation) Al-Hilal
14	DF	Saad Al-Mousa	10 December 2002 (aged 22)	0	0	(Saudi Arabian Football Federation) Al-Ittihad
15	MF	Abdulelah Hawsawi	2 June 2001 (aged 23)	0	0	(Saudi Arabian Football Federation) Al-Ittihad
16	MF	Ayman Fallatah	2 October 2003 (aged 21)	0	0	(Saudi Arabian Football Federation) Damac
17	DF	Hassan Al-Tambakti	9 February 1999 (aged 25)	35	0	(Saudi Arabian Football Federation) Al-Hilal
18	MF	Mohammed Al-Qahtani	23 July 2002 (aged 22)	4	0	(Saudi Arabian Football Federation) Al-Hilal
19	FW	Abdullah Al-Hamdan	13 September 1999 (aged 25)	32	5	(Saudi Arabian Football Federation) Al-Hilal
20	FW	Abdullah Radif	20 January 2003 (aged 21)	19	2	(Saudi Arabian Football Federation) Al-Ettifaq
21	GK	Mohammed Al-Owais	10 October 1991 (aged 33)	58	0	(Saudi Arabian Football Federation) Al-Hilal
22	GK	Ahmed Al-Kassar	8 May 1991 (aged 33)	8	0	(Saudi Arabian Football Federation) Al-Qadsiah
23	MF	Mohamed Kanno	22 September 1994 (aged 30)	58	3	(Saudi Arabian Football Federation) Al-Hilal
24	MF	Abdulmalik Al-Oyayari	10 December 2003 (aged 21)	0	0	(Saudi Arabian Football Federation) Neom
25	FW	Abdulaziz Al-Othman	2 January 2004 (aged 20)	0	0	(Saudi Arabian Football Federation) Al-Qadsiah
26	DF	Nawaf Boushal	16 September 1999 (aged 25)	1	0	(Saudi Arabian Football Federation) Al-Nassr

=== Yemen ===
Yemen announced their final squad on 18 December 2024.

Head coach: (Algeria) Noureddine Ould Ali

No.	Pos.	Player	Date of birth (age)	Caps	Goals	Club
1	GK	Mohamed Aman	14 April 1997 (aged 27)	11	0	(Yemen Football Association) Ahli Sanaa
2	MF	Ahmed Al-Khamisi	10 September 2003 (aged 21)	0	0	(Royal Dutch Football Association) EFC '58
3	DF	Harwan Al-Zubaidi	15 October 1999 (aged 25)	11	0	(Royal Spanish Football Federation) Quart de les Valls
4	DF	Hamza Al-Rimi	12 February 2002 (aged 22)	14	0	(Iraq Football Association) Al-Talaba
5	DF	Amr Talal	1 January 1997 (aged 27)	1	0	(Yemen Football Association) Al-Wehda Aden
6	DF	Rami Al-Wasmani	1 February 1997 (aged 27)	5	0	(Yemen Football Association) Ahli Sanaa
7	MF	Nasser Al-Gahwashi	24 May 1999 (aged 25)	27	3	(Iraq Football Association) Zakho
8	MF	Anes Al-Maari	9 January 2000 (aged 24)	14	0	(Iraq Football Association) Al-Gharraf
9	FW	Omar Al-Dahi	15 December 1999 (aged 25)	28	4	(Iraq Football Association) Al-Karma
10	MF	Mohammed Al-Najjar	8 April 1997 (aged 27)	5	0	(Yemen Football Association) Al-Wehda Sanaa
11	FW	Abdulwasea Al-Matari (captain)	4 July 1994 (aged 30)	65	11	(Bahrain Football Association) Sitra
12	DF	Mamdooh Bin Agag	29 May 2003 (aged 21)	2	0	(Yemen Football Association) Al-Shaab Hadramaut
13	DF	Ahmed Nasser		1	0	(Yemen Football Association) Al-Shula
14	MF	Mohammed Al-Tiri	4 February 2000 (aged 24)	11	0	(Yemen Football Association) Al-Wehda Sanaa
15	MF	Osama Anbar	20 January 1995 (aged 29)	12	0	(Iraq Football Association) Al-Kahrabaa
16	MF	Omar Al-Golan		2	0	(Yemen Football Association) Al-Tilal
17	MF	Abdul Majeed Sabarah	22 August 2000 (aged 24)	10	1	(Yemen Football Association) Al-Wehda Sanaa
18	FW	Abdulaziz Masnom	6 February 2006 (aged 18)	1	0	(Saudi Arabian Football Federation) Al-Orobah
19	DF	Radhawan Al-Hubaishi	3 July 1993 (aged 31)	6	0	(Yemen Football Association) Ahli Sanaa
20	FW	Hamzah Mahross	5 May 2004 (aged 20)	8	1	(Yemen Football Association) Ahli Sanaa
21	FW	Kassem Al-Sharafi	15 October 2004 (aged 20)	3	0	(Yemen Football Association) Al-Wehda Sanaa
22	GK	Abdullah Al-Saadi	23 April 2002 (aged 22)	5	0	(Saudi Arabian Football Federation) Sharurah
23	GK	Osama Abdullah Haidar	27 February 2002 (aged 22)	0	0	(Yemen Football Association) May 22 San'a
24	DF	Ali Al-Dugin	2 May 2003 (aged 21)	1	0	(Yemen Football Association) Al-Wehda Aden
25	MF	Tareq Shihab	7 March 2001 (aged 23)	1	0	(Football Association of Iceland) HK
26	DF	Hamzah Al-Surabi	7 May 2003 (aged 21)	1	0	(Yemen Football Association) Al-Yarmuk Al-Rawda
