= 2021–22 Al-Duhail SC season =

Al-Duhail
2021–22 season
- Chairman: Khalifa bin Hamad bin Khalifa Al Thani
- Head coach: Luis Castro (from 10 August 2021) (until 18 March 2022); Hernán Crespo (from 24 March 2022)
- Stadium: Abdullah bin Khalifa Stadium
- Qatar Stars League: Runners–up
- Emir of Qatar Cup: Winners
- Champions League: Group stage
- Top goalscorer: League: Michael Olunga (24); All: Michael Olunga (30)
Home colours	Away colours

In the 2021–22 season, Al-Duhail is competing in the Qatar Stars League for the 11th season, as well as the Emir of Qatar Cup and the Champions League.

== Squad list ==
Players and squad numbers last updated on 3 September 2021.
Note: Flags indicate national team as has been defined under FIFA eligibility rules. Players may hold more than one non-FIFA nationality.

No.	Nat.	Position	Name	Date of Birth (Age)	Signed from
Goalkeepers
	(Qatar)	GK	Mohammed Al-Bakri	28 March 1997 (aged 24)	(Qatar) Youth system
21	(Qatar)	GK	Salah Zakaria	24 April 1999 (aged 22)	(Qatar) Al-Wakrah
Defenders
	(Qatar)	RB	Ali Malolah	26 February 1999 (aged 22)	(Qatar) Al-Wakrah
2	(Qatar)	CB	Mohammed Musa	23 March 1986 (aged 35)	(Qatar) Umm Salal
	(Qatar)	CB / RB	Bassam Al-Rawi	16 December 1997 (aged 23)	(Qatar) Al-Rayyan
	(Qatar)	CB	Ahmed Yasser	17 May 1994 (aged 27)	(Qatar) Aspire Academy
4	(Belgium)	CB / RB	Toby Alderweireld	2 March 1989 (aged 32)	(England) Tottenham Hotspur
18	(Qatar)	LB	Sultan Al-Brake	7 April 1996 (aged 25)	(Qatar) Aspire Academy
Midfielders
8	(Qatar)	DM	Luiz Júnior	13 January 1989 (aged 32)	(Brazil) Uniclinic
10	(Belgium)	LW	Edmilson	19 August 1994 (aged 27)	(Belgium) Standard Liège
12	(Qatar)	DM	Karim Boudiaf	16 September 1990 (aged 31)	(France) Nancy
	(Qatar)	AM	Abdullah Al-Ahrak	10 May 1997 (aged 24)	(Spain) Cultural Leonesa
13	(Tunisia)	DM	Ferjani Sassi	18 March 1992 (aged 29)	(Egypt) Zamalek
23	(Qatar)	DM	Assim Madibo	22 October 1996 (aged 24)	(Spain) Cultural Leonesa
19	(South Korea)	AM	Nam Tae-hee	3 July 1991 (aged 30)	(Qatar) Al Sadd SC
Forwards
11	(Qatar)	ST	Almoez Ali	19 August 1996 (aged 25)	(Spain) Cultural Leonesa
7	(Qatar)	RW	Ismaeel Mohammad	5 April 1990 (aged 31)	(Qatar) El Jaish
14	(Kenya)	ST	Michael Olunga	26 March 1994 (aged 27)	(Japan) Kashiwa Reysol
20	(Qatar)	LW	Ali Afif	20 January 1988 (aged 33)	(Qatar) Al Sadd SC
	(Qatar)	ST	Mohammed Muntari	20 December 1993 (aged 27)	(Qatar) El Jaish

== Pre-season and friendlies ==
8 August 2021 Pre-season	SV Seekirchen 1945 (Austria)	0–2	Al-Duhail SC	?, Austria
11:30		Report	Edmilson; Sassi	Stadium: ?

== Competitions ==
=== Overview ===
Competition	Record								Started round	Final position / round	First match	Last match
Competition	G	W	D	L	GF	GA	GD	Win %	Started round	Final position / round	First match	Last match
Qatar Stars League	22	14	5	3	59	24	+35	63.64	Matchday 1	Runners–up	12 September 2021	10 March 2022
Emir of Qatar Cup	4	4	0	0	16	6	+10	100.00	Round of 16	Winners	15 February 2022	18 March 2022
2022 Champions League	6	5	0	1	17	9	+8	83.33	Group stage		7 April 2022	26 April 2022
Total	32	23	5	4	92	39	+53	71.88				

Updated to match played 26 April 2022
Source: Competitions

=== Qatar Stars League ===
==== League table ====
Pos	Team	Pld	W	D	L	GF	GA	GD	Pts	Qualification or relegation
1	Al Sadd (C)	22	20	2	0	80	24	+56	62	Qualification for AFC Champions League group stage
2	Al Duhail	22	14	5	3	59	24	+35	47	Qualification for AFC Champions League play-off round (Note: as 2022 Emir of Qatar Cup winner)
3	Al-Wakrah	22	11	4	7	34	30	+4	37	
4	Al-Arabi	22	11	3	8	34	31	+3	36	
5	Al-Gharafa	22	9	3	10	39	40	−1	30	

Source: QSL, Soccerway
Rules for classification: 1) Points; 2) Goal difference; 3) Number of goals scored;
(C) Champions

==== Results summary ====
Overall								Home						Away					
Pld	W	D	L	GF	GA	GD	Pts	W	D	L	GF	GA	GD	W	D	L	GF	GA	GD
22	14	5	3	59	24	+35	47	7	3	1	29	12	+17	7	2	2	30	12	+18

Last updated: 10 March 2022.
Source: Competitive matches

==== Results by round ====
Round	1	2	3	4	5	6	7	8	9	10	11	12	13	14	15	16	17	18	19	20	21	22
Ground	A	A	H	H	A	H	A	H	H	A	A	H	H	A	A	H	A	H	A	A	H	H
Result	W	W	W	W	L	W	W	W	D	L	W	D	W	W	D	L	W	W	W	D	W	D
Position	1	1	1	2	2	2	2	2	2	2	2	2	2	2	2	2	2	2	2	2	2	2

Updated to match(es) played on 10 March 2022. Source: Competitive matches
A = Away; H = Home; W = Win; D = Draw; L = Loss

==== Matches ====
Win Draw Loss

12 September 2021 Round 1	Al-Khor	1–4	Al-Duhail	Al Khor
19:05	Rafael Vaz 4'	Report	Olunga 34', 68' (pen.); Ismaeel Mohammad 50'; Khaled Mohammed 89'	Stadium: Al-Khor SC Stadium; Referee: Khalid Nabet

16 September 2021 Round 2	Al-Arabi	1–2	Al-Duhail	Doha
20:30	Ilyas 90+5'	Report	Boussafi 53', 66'	Stadium: Khalifa International Stadium; Referee: Mohammed Al-Shammari

22 September 2021 Round 3	Al-Duhail	3–1	Al-Gharafa	Doha
16:45	Almoez Ali 28' (pen.); Moustafa 54', 67'	Report	Alaaeldin 59' (pen.)	Stadium: Khalifa International Stadium; Referee: Salman Ahmad Flahi

26 September 2021 Round 4	Al-Duhail	5–0	Al-Sailiya	Doha
16:45	Olunga 56', 62', 68', 79', 85'	Report		Stadium: Khalifa International Stadium; Referee: Abdulhadi Al Ruaile

21 October 2021 Round 5	Al-Wakrah	4–1	Al-Duhail	Al Wakrah
19:30	Gelson Dala 45', 69'; Benyettou 61'; Shehata 88'	Report	Almoez Ali 29'	Stadium: Saoud bin Abdulrahman Stadium; Referee: Sultan Al Sharshani

17 October 2021 Round 6	Al-Duhail	3–0	Al-Rayyan	Doha
20:10	Luiz Júnior 3' (pen.); Almoez Ali 40' (pen.); Olunga 55'	Report		Stadium: Abdullah bin Khalifa Stadium; Referee: Mohammed Al Shummari

25 October 2021 Round 7	Al-Shamal	0–1	Al-Duhail	Al Khor
17:20		Report	Olunga 54' (pen.)	Stadium: Al-Khor SC Stadium; Referee: Abdulrahman Al Jassim

30 October 2021 Round 8	Al-Duhail	2–1	Qatar SC	Doha
17:15	Nam Tae-hee 38'; Olunga 46'	Report	Martínez 15'	Stadium: Thani bin Jassim Stadium; Referee: Saoud Al Athbah

3 November 2021 Round 9	Al-Duhail	3–3	Al-Sadd	Doha
19:55	Olunga 24', 89'; Pedro Miguel 31' (o.g.)	Report	Bounedjah 4'; Khoukhi 73'; Tabata 74'	Stadium: Thani bin Jassim Stadium; Referee: Meshari Al shammari

25 December 2021 Round 10	Umm Salal	2–1	Al-Duhail	Doha
16:05	al-Bakhit 39'; Isael 85'	Report	Mohammad 29'	Stadium: Thani bin Jassim Stadium; Referee: Abdullah Al Athbah

29 December 2021 Round 11	Al-Ahli	0–6	Al-Duhail	Doha
18:20		Report	Bahzad 4' (o.g.); Olunga 7'; Nam Tae-hee 28'; Almoez Ali 44'; Abdulsalam 71'; Edmilson 79'	Stadium: Hamad bin Khalifa Stadium; Referee: Khamis Al Marri

4 January 2022 Round 12	Al-Duhail	1–1	Al-Khor	Doha
16:10	Nam Tae-hee 7'	Report	El Haddad 32'	Stadium: Grand Hamad Stadium; Referee: Abdulhadi Al Ruaile

8 January 2022 Round 13	Al-Duhail	2–0	Al-Arabi	Doha
16:15	Olunga 4', 48'	Report		Stadium: Grand Hamad Stadium; Referee: Khamis Al Marri

13 January 2022 Round 14	Al-Gharafa	2–4	Al-Duhail	Doha
16:20	Gabriel 59'; Al Ganehi 69'	Report	Edmilson 14'; Olunga 47'; Almoez Ali 56'; Boussafi 90+8'	Stadium: Thani bin Jassim Stadium; Referee: Meshari Al Shammari

17 January 2022 Round 15	Al-Sailiya	1–1	Al-Duhail	Doha
18:30	Majdi Siddiq 90+2'	Report	Olunga 56'	Stadium: Suheim Bin Hamad Stadium; Referee: Abdulrahman Al Jassim

22 January 2022 Round 16	Al-Duhail	0–4	Al-Wakrah	Doha
16:30		Report	Emad 52'; Dala 55'; Khalid Muneer 57'; Benyettou 88'	Stadium: Grand Hamad Stadium; Referee: Salman Ahmad Flahi

5 February 2022 Round 17	Al-Rayyan	0–4	Al-Duhail	Doha
18:05	Nam Tae-hee 21'; Olunga 41', 53'; Mohammed Musa 78'	Report		Stadium: Jassim Bin Hamad Stadium; Referee: Saoud Al Athbah

9 February 2022 Round 18	Al-Duhail	4–1	Al-Shamal	Doha
18:50	Olunga 23', 54'; Nam Tae-hee 45'; Edmilson 61'	Report	Attwan 90+3' (pen.)	Stadium: Jassim Bin Hamad Stadium; Referee: Mohammed Al-Sherif

21 February 2022 Round 19	Qatar SC	0–5	Al-Duhail	Doha
18:55		Report	Olunga 43', 61'; Almoez Ali 65' (pen.), 89'; Hamza 90'	Stadium: Grand Hamad Stadium; Referee: Abdulhadi Al Ruaile

25 February 2022 Round 20	Al Sadd SC	1–1	Al-Duhail	Doha
19:00	Akram Afif 59'	Report	Edmilson 36' (pen.)	Stadium: Jassim Bin Hamad Stadium; Referee: Abdullah Al Athbah

2 March 2022 Round 21	Al-Duhail	6–1	Umm Salal	Doha
16:50	Olunga 12'; Al-Brake 45'; Edmilson 48'; Moustafa 51', 77'; Al Abdulla 86'	Report		Stadium: Jassim Bin Hamad Stadium; Referee: Sultan Al Sharshani

10 March 2022 Round 22	Al-Duhail	0–0	Al-Ahli	Doha
17:00		Report		Stadium: Jassim Bin Hamad Stadium; Referee: Salman Ahmad Flahi

== Emir of Qatar Cup ==
15 February 2022 Round of 16	Al-Duhail SC	4–2	Al-Khor	Doha
16:40	Almoez Ali 9'; Nam Tae-hee 18', 64'; Moustafa 41'	Report	Brahmi 52'; Al-Habsi 78'	Stadium: Thani bin Jassim Stadium; Referee: Sultan Al Sharshani

6 March 2022 Quarter-finals	Al-Sailiya	1–4	Al-Duhail SC	Doha
16:50	Bwalya 54'	Report	Alderweireld 12'; Mohammad 34'; Moustafa 57'; Boudiaf 76'	Stadium: Grand Hamad Stadium; Referee: Mohammed Al-Shammari

14 March 2022 Semi-finals	Al Sadd SC	2–3	Al-Duhail SC	Doha
19:45	Ayew 33'; Bounedjah 90'	Report	Sassi 7', 80'; Olunga 44'	Stadium: Jassim Bin Hamad Stadium; Referee: Salman Ahmad Flahi

18 March 2022 Final	Al-Duhail SC	5–1	Al-Gharafa	Doha
19:00	Edmilson 5'; Olunga 18'; Almoez Ali 52'; Sassi 58'; Moustafa 85'	Report	Alaaeldin 53'	Stadium: Khalifa International Stadium; Referee: Abdulhadi Al Ruaile

== 2022 AFC Champions League ==
=== Group stage ===
On 16 February 2022, AFC confirmed hosts for the East group stage. On 3 March 2022, AFC confirmed hosts for the West group stage.

- Group D: Buraidah, Saudi Arabia

==== Group D ====
Pos	Team	Pld	W	D	L	GF	GA	GD	Pts	Qualification	DUH	TWN	SEP	PAK
1	(Qatar) Al-Duhail	6	5	0	1	17	9	+8	15	Advance to Round of 16	—	1–2	5–2	3–2
2	(Saudi Arabia) Al-Taawoun (H)	6	2	1	3	13	12	+1	7 (Note: Head-to-head points: Al-Taawoun 4, Sepahan 1.)		3–4	—	3–0	0–1
3	(Iran) Sepahan	6	2	1	3	8	12	−4	7		0–1	1–1	—	2–1
4	(Uzbekistan) Pakhtakor	6	2	0	4	10	15	−5	6		0–3	5–4	1–3	—

Source: AFC
(H) Hosts
Notes:

7 April 2022 1	Al-Duhail (Qatar)	1–2	(Saudi Arabia) Al-Taawoun	Buraidah
23:15 UTC+3	Edmilson 7'	Report	Tawamba 11'; Medrán 86'	Stadium: King Abdullah Sport City Stadium; Attendance: 5,000; Referee: Mohanad Qasim Sarray (Iraq)

10 April 2022 2	Sepahan (Iran)	0–1	(Qatar) Al-Duhail	Buraidah
20:15 UTC+3		Report	Olunga 84'	Stadium: King Abdullah Sport City Stadium; Attendance: 0 Referee: Sivakorn Pu-udom (Thailand)

14 April 2022 3	Al-Duhail (Qatar)	3–2	(Uzbekistan) Pakhtakor	Buraidah
20:15 UTC+3	Edmilson 66', 71', 84'	Report	Sarkic 44'; Sabirkhodjaev 69'	Stadium: King Abdullah Sport City Stadium; Attendance: 136; Referee: Kim Dae-yong (South Korea)

18 April 2022 4	Pakhtakor (Uzbekistan)	0–3	(Qatar) Al-Duhail	Buraidah
20:15 UTC+3	Al-Rawi 32'; Olunga 45+2'; Ali 47'	Report		Stadium: King Abdullah Sport City Stadium; Referee: Mohd Amirul Izwan Yaacob (Malaysia)

22 April 2022 5	Al-Taawoun (Saudi Arabia)	3–4	(Qatar) Al-Duhail	Buraidah
23:15 UTC+3	Tawamba 21', 37'; Al-Amri 25'	Report	Boudiaf 11'; Edmilson 58', 84' (pen.); Ali 88'	Stadium: King Abdullah Sport City Stadium; Referee: Hiroyuki Kimura (Japan)

26 April 2022 6	Al-Duhail (Qatar)	5–2	(Iran) Sepahan	Buraidah
20:15 UTC+3	Olunga 10', 35'; Edmilson 41', 90'; Sassi 50'	Report	Nejadmehdi 20'; Rafiei 82'	Stadium: King Abdullah Sport City Stadium

== Squad information ==
=== Playing statistics ===
As of 18 March 2022

No.	Pos	Nat	Player	Total		Qatar Stars League		Emir of Qatar Cup		AFC CL1	
No.	Pos	Nat	Player	Apps	Goals	Apps	Goals	Apps	Goals	Apps	Goals
1	GK	(Qatar) QAT	Mohammed Al-Bakri	4	0	4	0	0	0	0	0
21	GK	(Qatar) QAT	Salah Zakaria	19	0	15	0	4	0	0	0
99	GK	(Qatar) QAT	Shehab Ellethy	3	0	3	0	0	0	0	0
2	DF	(Qatar) QAT	Mohammed Musa	17	1	13	1	4	0	0	0
3	MF	(Qatar) QAT	Mohammed Alaaeldin	19	0	17	0	2	0	0	0
4	MF	(Belgium) BEL	Toby Alderweireld	24	1	20	0	4	1	0	0
5	DF	(Qatar) QAT	Bassam Al-Rawi	20	0	17	0	3	0	0	0
15	DF	(Qatar) QAT	Mohammed Al Naimi	4	0	4	0	0	0	0	0
18	DF	(Qatar) QAT	Sultan Al-Brake	20	1	17	1	3	0	0	0
8	MF	(Qatar) QAT	Luiz Júnior	21	0	17	0	4	0	0	0
10	MF	(Belgium) BEL	Edmilson	21	7	17	6	4	1	0	0
12	MF	(Qatar) QAT	Karim Boudiaf	15	1	12	0	3	1	0	0
13	FW	(Tunisia) TUN	Ferjani Sassi	22	3	18	0	4	3	0	0
17	MF	(Qatar) QAT	Abdelrahman Moustafa	11	7	7	4	4	3	0	0
19	MF	(South Korea) KOR	Nam Tae-hee	20	7	16	5	4	2	0	0
23	MF	(Qatar) QAT	Assim Madibo	19	0	16	0	3	0	0	0
27	MF	(Qatar) QAT	Abdullah Al-Ahrak	14	1	14	1	0	0	0	0
39	MF	(Qatar) QAT	Lotfi Madjer	6	0	5	0	1	0	0	0
20	FW	(Qatar) QAT	Ali Afif	15	0	11	0	4	0	0	0
7	FW	(Qatar) QAT	Ismaeel Mohammad	18	3	15	2	3	1	0	0
11	FW	(Qatar) QAT	Almoez Ali	20	9	17	7	3	2	0	0
14	MF	(Kenya) KEN	Michael Olunga	24	26	20	24	4	2	0	0
26	FW	(Qatar) QAT	Rabh Boussafi	13	3	13	3	0	0	0	0
29	FW	(Qatar) QAT	Mohammed Muntari	4	0	4	0	0	0	0	0
36	MF	(Qatar) QAT	Abdulaziz Mohamad Hassan	1	0	1	0	0	0	0	0
Players transferred out during the season

Last updated: 10 March 2022
Source: fr.soccerway.com

=== Goalscorers ===
As of 18 March 2022

Includes all competitive matches. The list is sorted alphabetically by surname when total goals are equal.

No.	Nat.	Player	Pos.	QSL	QEC	CL 1	TOTAL
14	(Kenya)	Michael Olunga	FW	24	2	4	30
10	(Belgium)	Edmilson	MF	4	1	8	13
11	(Qatar)	Almoez Ali	FW	7	2	2	11
19	(South Korea)	Nam Tae-hee	MF	5	2	0	7
17	(Qatar)	Abdelrahman Moustafa	MF	4	3	0	7
13	(Tunisia)	Ferjani Sassi	MF	0	3	1	4
26	(Qatar)	Rabh Boussafi	FW	3	0	0	3
7	(Qatar)	Ismaeel Mohammad	FW	2	1	0	3
12	(Qatar)	Karim Boudiaf	MF	0	1	1	2
2	(Qatar)	Mohammed Musa	DF	1	0	0	1
8	(Qatar)	Luiz Júnior	MF	1	0	0	1
	(Qatar)	Khaled Mohammed	MF	1	0	0	1
27	(Qatar)	Abdullah Al-Ahrak	MF	1	0	0	1
18	(Qatar)	Sultan Al-Brake	DF	1	0	0	1
25	(Qatar)	Mubarak Hamza	FW	1	0	0	1
86	(Qatar)	Rashid Al Abdulla	MF	1	0	0	1
4	(Belgium)	Toby Alderweireld	DF	0	1	0	1
5	(Qatar)	Bassam Al-Rawi	DF	0	0	1	1
Own Goals				2	0	0	0
Totals				59	16	17	92

=== Assists ===
No.	Nat.	Player	Pos.	QSL	QEC	CL 1	TOTAL

== Transfers ==
=== In ===
Date	Pos	Player	From club	Transfer fee	Source
9 July 2021	MF	(South Korea) Nam Tae-hee	Al Sadd SC	Free transfer	
27 July 2021	DF	(Belgium) Toby Alderweireld	(England) Tottenham Hotspur	Undisclosed	
29 July 2021	MF	(Tunisia) Ferjani Sassi	(Egypt) Zamalek	Free transfer	

=== Out ===
Date	Pos	Player	To club	Transfer fee	Source
1 September 2021	DF	(Qatar) Ahmed Yasser	Al-Rayyan	Free transfer	
9 September 2021	DF	(Qatar) Ali Malolah	Al-Rayyan	Loan for one year	
