= Al-Yahri =

Al-Yahri is a surname. Notable people with the surname include:

- Abdulaziz Al-Yahri (born 1990), Qatari footballer
- Othman Al-Yahri (born 1993), Qatari footballer
- Salah Al-Yahri (born 1995), Qatari footballer
- Saleh Al-Yahri (born 1995), Qatari footballer
