= Sayyar =

Sayyar (Arabic: سیار) is a masculine given name and surname of Arabic origin. Notable people with the name include:

== Given name ==
- Sayyar Jamil (born 1952), Iraqi academic

== Father name ==
- Nasr ibn Sayyar (663–748), Arab general and governor
- Ibn Sayyar al-Warraq, 10th-century Arab writer

== Surname ==
- Ahmed Sayyar (born 1993), Qatari football player
- Ali Sayyar (1926–2019), Bahraini journalist and politician
- Mohammed Sayyar (born 1991), Qatari football player

== See also ==
- Sayyar Ahmadabad-e Movali, village in Iran
