= Al Shahaniya SC =

Association football club in Qatar

Al-Shahaniya
- Full name: Al-Shahaniya Sports Club
- Founded: 1996; 30 years ago
- Ground: Grand Hamad Stadium
- Capacity: 13,000
- Chairman: Menahi Al-Shammari
- Head coach: Younes Ali
- League: Qatar Stars League
- 2025–26: Qatar Stars League, 11th of 12
- Website: www.alshahania.qa
Home colours	Away colours

Al-Shahaniya Sports Club (also spelled Al-Shahania) (Arabic: نادي الشحانية الرياضي), is a Qatari sports club based in Al-Shahaniya, a town 20 km from the capital Doha. Founded in 1998, the most prominent section is football club which plays in the Qatari Stars League. The club's home ground is Grand Hamad Stadium.

== History ==
Al Shahaniya was founded in 1996 as Al-Nasr, under the decision of Sheikh Mohammed Bin Eid Al Thani, the chairman of the Public Authority for Youth and Sports (current-day Ministry of Sports and Youth). The club was considered as the spiritual successor of Al Nasr SC, an amateur football club founded in 1951. Al Nasr (Victory) became notable as the first Qatari club to play against international clubs and recruit foreigners.

At the beginning of its establishment, the club's headquarters were located in Al Jemailiya. In 2001, the club relocated to Al-Shahaniya. It was furnished with its own stadium and headquarters, although with limited capacity. In 2004, the club changed its name to Al Shahaniya, in order to better represent the region.

== Players ==
As of 7 September 2026

Note: Flags indicate national team as defined under FIFA eligibility rules; some limited exceptions apply. Players may hold more than one non-FIFA nationality.

No.	Pos.	Nation	Player
2	DF	QAT	Mohammed Alaaeldin
3	DF	QAT	Bahaa Ellethy (on loan from Al-Rayyan)
4	MF	BHR	Mohammed Sayyar
5	DF	ESP	Marc Muniesa
6	MF	ESP	Álvaro Sanz
7	MF	QAT	Abdurahman Mesaad
8	MF	TUN	Amenallah Meherzi
9	FW	CIV	Abdoulaye Traoré
10	MF	BEL	Francesco Antonucci
11	MF	ESP	Jawad El Jemili
14	DF	QAT	Saleh Al-Yahri
15	DF	QAT	Ebrahim Abdo
16	GK	QAT	Mohamed Kadik
17	FW	QAT	Abdelrahman Moustafa (on loan from Al Duhail)
18	MF	QAT	Adel Al-Sulaimane

No.	Pos.	Nation	Player
19	DF	QAT	Abdullah Al-Sulaiti (on loan from Al-Arabi)
20	MF	QAT	Ali Qadry
21	MF	QAT	Mohamed Surag
22	DF	NED	Sven van Beek
23	GK	QAT	Mohamed Saeed Ibrahim
27	MF	FRA	Ibrahima Diallo (on loan from Al-Khor)
31	DF	CRO	Zvonimir Šarlija
32	DF	QAT	Khalid Muftah
77	DF	QAT	Yousef Hani Ballan
81	FW	BRA	Lucão (on loan from Al-Sadd)
88	MF	QAT	Moameen Mutasem (on loan from Al-Rayyan)
96	FW	QAT	Mohammed Al-Raeesi
99	GK	QAT	Shehab Ellethy

== Management ==
As of 20 June 2023

Board of directors
President	(Qatar) Menahi Al Shammari
Vice-president	(Qatar) Salem Al Hajry
General manager	(Qatar) Faisal Mattar Al Shammari

=== Presidential history ===
Updated June 2014.
1. (Qatar) Misfer bin Faisal Al Shahwani (1996–04)
2. (Qatar) Fayez Menahi Al Hajri (2004–07)
3. (Qatar) Misfer bin Faisal Al Shahwani (2007–08)
4. (Qatar) Menahi Al Shammari (2008–present)

== Managerial history ==
- (Brazil) Stefano Impagliazzo (2002)
- (Netherlands) Danny Hoekman (December 2003–March 2004)
- (Egypt) Fareed Ramzi (2004)
- (Iraq) Saad Hafez (2004–2006)
- (Morocco) Said Riziki (2006–2007)
- (France) Stéphane Morello (2007–2008)
- (Iraq) Firas Hazem Al Sheikhly (2008–2009)
- (Brazil) Luizinho (2009)
- (Iraq) Hisham Ali (2009)
- (Syria) Mohammad Sibai (2009–February 2012)
- (Brazil) Luizinho (February–November 2012)
- (Romania) Ion Ion (November 2012–February 2013)
- (Qatar) Yousuf Adam (February–May 2013)
- (Brazil) Milton Mendes (May–September 2013)
- (Portugal) Zé Nando (September 2013–January 2014)
- (Brazil) Alexandre Gama (January–May 2014)
- (Portugal) Luís Martins (May–July 2014)
- (Spain) Miguel Ángel Lotina (July–September 2014)
- (Portugal) Zé Nando (September–November 2014)
- (Croatia) Luka Bonačić (November 2014–2016)
- (Portugal) Zé Nando (October–December 2016)
- (Croatia) Igor Štimac (2016–November 2017)
- (Spain) José Murcia (November 2017–June 2020)
- (Qatar) Nabil Anwar (September 2020–February 2022)
- (Spain) Álvaro Mejía (2022)
