= Alaaeldin =

Alaaeldin is both a given name and a surname. Notable people with the name include:

== Surname ==
- Ahmed Alaaeldin (born 1993), Qatari footballer
- Mohammed Alaaeldin (born 1994), Qatari footballer

== Given name ==
- Alaaeldin Abouelkassem (born 1990), Egyptian fencer

== See also ==
- Aladdin (name)
