= Nasser Sherian =

Qatari footballer (born 1994)

Personal information
- Full name: Nasser Saad Sherian Al-Kaebi
- Date of birth: 11 November 1994 (age 31)
- Place of birth: Qatar
- Position: Winger

Youth career
- Al-Ahli

Senior career*
Years	Team	Apps	(Gls)
2012–2016	Al-Rayyan		
2014–2016	→ Al-Shahania (loan)		
2016–2017	Al-Kharaitiyat		
2017	→ Al-Shahania (loan)		
2017–2018	Al Ahli		
- * Club domestic league appearances and goals

Nasser Sherian (Arabic:ناصر شريان) (born 11 November 1994) is a Qatari footballer who plays as a winger.
