= Yousef Hani Ballan =

Qatari footballer (born 1996)

Yousef Hani
Personal information
- Full name: Yousef Hani Ballan
- Date of birth: 9 December 1996 (age 29)
- Place of birth: Qatar
- Positions: Winger; left back

Team information
- Current team: Al Shahaniya
- Number: 77

Youth career
- Aspire

Senior career*
Years	Team	Apps	(Gls)
2015–2016	Qatar	0	(0)
2016–2017	Al Shahaniya	17	(0)
2017–2020	Qatar	3	(0)
2017–2019	→ Al Shahaniya (loan)	30	(2)
2020–2022	Al Shahaniya	20	(0)
2022–2024	Al-Markhiya	14	(0)
2024–	Al Shahaniya	18	(0)
- * Club domestic league appearances and goals as of 17 January 2026

Yousef Hani Ballan (Arabic:يوسف هاني بلان) (born 9 December 1996) is a Qatari footballer who plays for Al Shahaniya as a winger or a left back.
