= Toby Alderweireld =

Belgian footballer (born 1989)

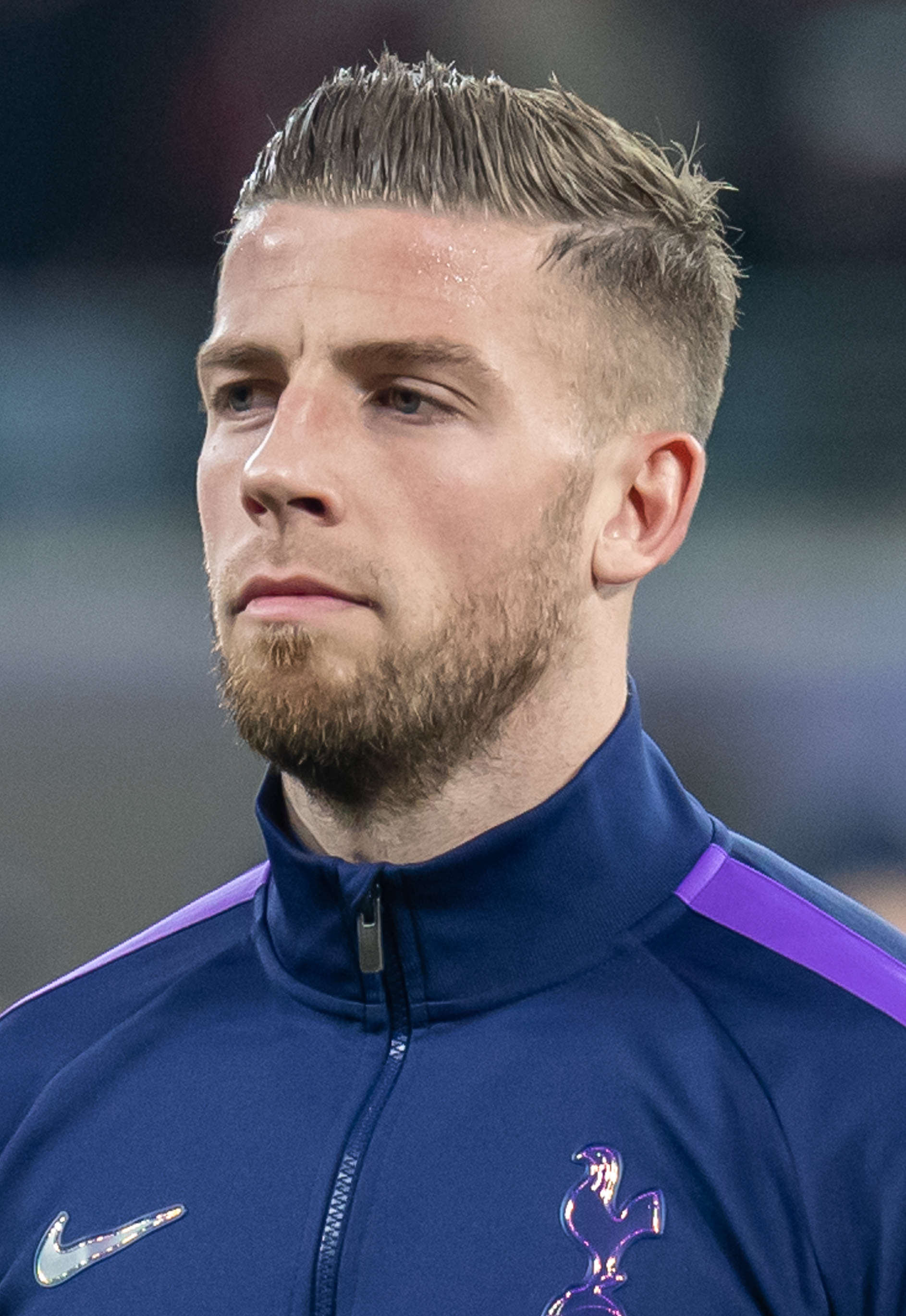
- Alderweireld with Tottenham Hotspur in 2020

Personal information
- Full name: Toby Albertine Maurits Alderweireld
- Date of birth: 2 March 1989 (age 37)
- Place of birth: Antwerp, Belgium
- Height: 1.86 m (6 ft 1 in)
- Position: Centre-back

Youth career
- 1994–1999: Germinal Ekeren
- 1999–2004: Germinal Beerschot
- 2004–2008: Ajax

Senior career*
Years	Team	Apps	(Gls)
2008–2013	Ajax	128	(7)
2013–2015	Atlético Madrid	12	(1)
2014–2015	→ Southampton (loan)	26	(1)
2015–2021	Tottenham Hotspur	174	(8)
2021–2022	Al-Duhail	20	(0)
2022–2025	Royal Antwerp	103	(13)
Total		463	(30)

International career
2004	Belgium U15	3	(1)
2004	Belgium U16	2	(0)
2005–2006	Belgium U17	17	(3)
2006	Belgium U18	3	(0)
2006–2007	Belgium U19	9	(0)
2009–2010	Belgium U21	5	(0)
2009–2022	Belgium	127	(5)
Medal record
Men's football
Representing Belgium
FIFA World Cup
Third place	2018 Russia
- * Club domestic league appearances and goals

Toby Albertine Maurits Alderweireld (Dutch pronunciation: [ˈɑldərˌʋeːrəlt]; born 2 March 1989) is a Belgian former professional footballer who played as a centre-back.

Alderweireld began his professional career at Dutch club Ajax, where he won honours including three consecutive Eredivisie titles. In 2013, he moved to Atlético Madrid, where he won La Liga and reached the UEFA Champions League final in his first season. After a year on loan at Southampton, he moved to Tottenham Hotspur in 2015 and once again reached the Champions League final in 2019. He left Tottenham in 2021, having made 236 official appearances in all competitions, to join Al-Duhail. After one season in Qatar, he returned to Belgium and signed for his hometown club Royal Antwerp, winning the Belgian Pro League in his first season there and scoring the title-winning goal, before retiring from football in 2025.

Having been a senior Belgium international from 2009, Alderweireld earned 127 caps and represented the country at the FIFA World Cup in 2014, 2018, and 2022, and the UEFA European Championship in 2016 and 2020. He retired from international football in March 2023.

== Club career ==
=== Ajax ===
Born in Antwerp, Alderweireld moved to Ajax's youth academy in August 2004 from Germinal Beerschot. On 22 February 2007, he signed his first professional contract, tying him to the club until 30 June 2010. He was promoted to the first team for the 2008–09 season, but only made his first team debut on 18 January, in the 4–2 victory over NEC. On 26 February, he made his European debut during a 1–1 draw against Fiorentina in the UEFA Cup. Although he only made several appearances for the remainder of the season, he was awarded a new long-term contract extension until 2014.

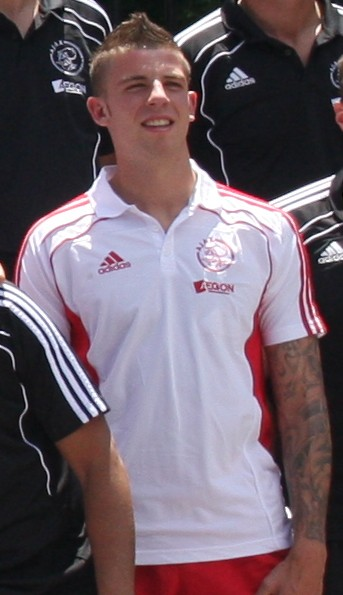
Alderweireld with Ajax

During the early stages of the 2009–10 season, Alderweireld established himself in the first team and starting XI. He became first-choice centre back along with fellow Belgian Jan Vertonghen following the departure of former captain Thomas Vermaelen to Arsenal. New Ajax coach Martin Jol praised the two defenders and kept faith in the duo after a string of good performances. During the 3–0 win against Heracles on 4 September, he scored his first league goal for the club when he opened the scoring with a header from Luis Suárez's corner-kick. On 27 January, he scored a late equaliser in extra time during the KNVB Cup quarter-final against NEC; Siem de Jong scored five minutes before the final whistle to steal a 3–2 win for Ajax. At the end of the 2009–10 season, Alderweireld was named Ajax Talent of the Year. He assured himself of a place in the Eredivisie giants' history books on 3 November 2011, heading in Ajax's 100th UEFA Champions League goal in the 2–1 Group G defeat by Auxerre. In the 2010–11 season, he scored a stunning 25-yard strike at the San Siro against Champions League group rivals AC Milan in a 2–0 away win. He followed this spectacular goal with an even more impressive 32-yard strike against Feyenoord in a 2–0 home win. In the 2011–12 season, Alderweireld made significant strides in his ability as a footballer, also forming a formidable partnership in the heart of the Ajax defensive with captain and fellow Belgian Jan Vertonghen. Alderweireld also showed some impressive offensive ability, scoring a remarkable goal against Heerenveen.

On 5 August 2012, during the Johan Cruyff Shield encounter against PSV, Alderweireld managed to score for Ajax in the 44th minute, bringing his club back within a goals difference going into halftime 2–1. It was a match Ajax would lose 4–2, making it the third Johan Cruyff Shield which Alderweireld participated in and finished as runners-up. The following 2012–13 season, however, would be a successful one, marking the third year in a row that Alderweireld would play Champions League football, and also winning his third consecutive Eredivisie title for Ajax and 32nd overall, having played as a starting centre back for Ajax in all three championship pursuits. Alderweireld scored a further three goals that season for Ajax, including two goals during the regular season against PEC Zwolle and Twente, as well as scoring another goal in a 2–0 home victory against Steaua București at the Amsterdam Arena, in the first leg of the Round of 32 in the 2012–13 UEFA Europa League. Having been drawn into a group with Manchester City, Real Madrid and eventual runners-up Borussia Dortmund during its Champions League campaign, Ajax had entered into the Europa League at the knockout phase having secured third place in their group, but failed to advance, losing in the second leg match in Romania 4–2 on penalty kicks after extra time.

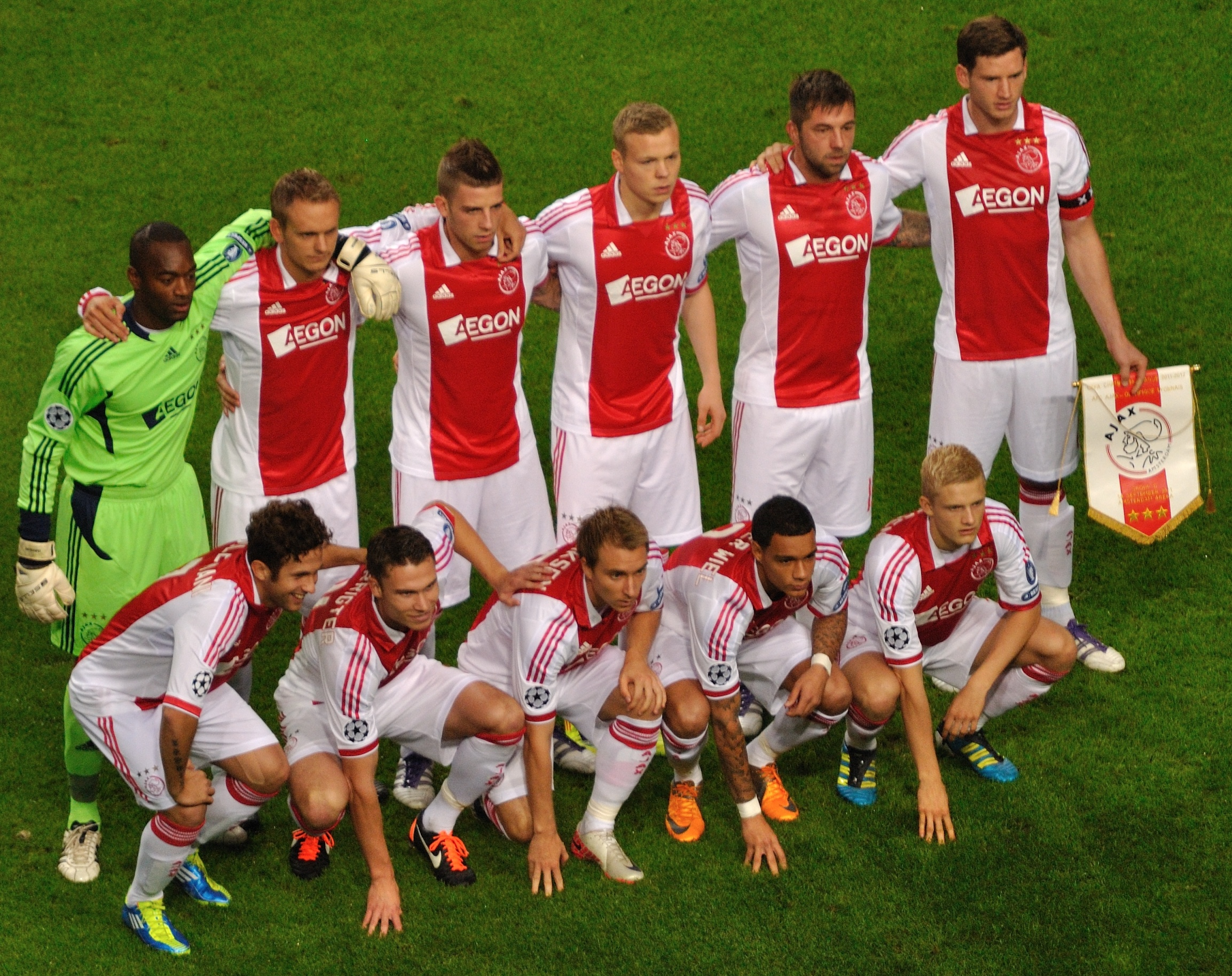
Alderweireld with Ajax teammates in 2011

With one more year remaining on his contract, Alderweireld opted not to extend his contract with Ajax, subsequently receiving plenty of interest during the off-season, with Bayer Leverkusen, Liverpool, Napoli and Norwich City being mentioned as the most keen to sign the young defender.

=== Atlético Madrid ===
On 2 September 2013, Alderweireld joined Atlético Madrid on a four-year contract for an estimated €7 million (£6.16 million) transfer fee. He played 12 matches as the club won La Liga; on 11 May, he headed his only goal of the season, an equaliser in a 1–1 home draw with Málaga in the penultimate round of fixtures, ensuring that Atlético remained in the title race. Alderweireld played the final seven minutes and extra time of the 2014 Champions League final for Atlético in place of Filipe Luís; the team was beating city rival Real Madrid 1–0 when he entered the field of play, but Atlético eventually lost 1–4.

==== Southampton (loan) ====
Alderweireld was sent on a season-long loan to English Premier League side Southampton on 1 September 2014, with the option for Southampton to buy him at the end of the season. He made his Southampton debut on 13 September, helping to keep a clean sheet in a 4–0 victory against Newcastle United. On 26 December, he scored his first goal for the club, Southampton's third in a 3–1 away win away to Crystal Palace by heading James Ward-Prowse's corner kick.

Southampton had a £6.8 million option to buy Alderweireld, but in July 2015 Atlético cancelled the clause for £1.5 million in order to sell to the highest bidder. Subsequent reports claimed that Atlético failed to exercise their buy-out in time.

=== Tottenham Hotspur ===
On 8 July 2015, Alderweireld joined Tottenham Hotspur on a five-year contract which ran until the summer of 2020 at White Hart Lane, despite Southampton threatening legal action over the transfer. At Spurs, he was reunited with former Ajax teammates Christian Eriksen and Jan Vertonghen, who previously joined the north London side from Ajax. On 30 July, Alderweireld made his club debut in the 2015 MLS All-Star Game in Denver, Colorado.

==== 2015–16: First season with Spurs ====
On 26 September, Alderweireld scored his first goal for Tottenham in a 4–1 win over Manchester City at White Hart Lane. His second goal for the club came in another 4–1 victory over London rivals West Ham United on 22 November. On 5 March 2016, in the 183rd North London Derby, Alderweireld scored for Tottenham in a 2–2 draw against Arsenal. A month later, he was Spurs' second scorer in a 3–0 win against Manchester United.

During his first season at Tottenham, Alderweireld has been recognised by commentators as one of the best defenders in the Premier League, forming impressive central defensive partnerships with national team colleague Jan Vertonghen and later the Austrian Kevin Wimmer. This form helped Tottenham to achieve the best defensive record in the Premier League, with only 25 goals conceded from 34 games. Over the season the club had the joint-lowest number of goals conceded (35) in the Premier League. He was chosen as a centre back for the PFA Team of the Year.

==== 2016–2021 ====
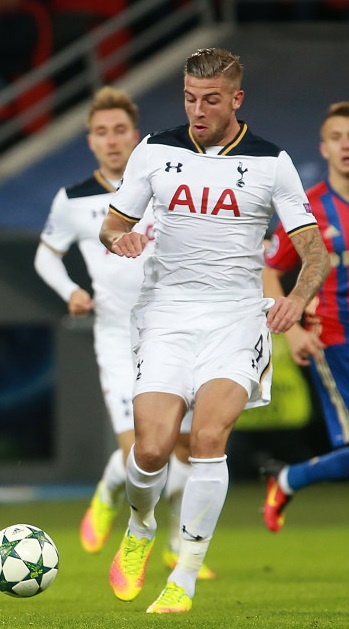
Alderweireld with Spurs in 2016

In the 2016–17 season, he was a regular in the Spurs starting line-up until an injury sustained at West Bromwich Albion on 15 October. This injury kept him on the injury list for several weeks, until he made his return in the Champions League as a substitute against CSKA Moscow on 7 December. Alderweireld picked up the final goal of the season for Tottenham, coming in the 7–1 win over already-relegated Hull City on 21 May 2017. He was part of the Tottenham defense that achieved the best defensive record in the club's history, with only 26 goals conceded in the Premier League this season (only 9 of which were conceded in home league games), 6 better than the previous record of 32 conceded that was set in the 1908–09 season in the Second Division.

Alderweireld played in all the Premier League and Champions League games from the start of the 2017–18 season, but on 1 November 2017, he suffered a hamstring injury in the home game against Real Madrid that ended in a 3–1 win. The injury would keep him out of the team for a few months. On 7 February 2018, he returned to the starting lineup in the fourth round replay of the FA Cup against Newport County, which Tottenham won 2–0. However, an injury to the tendon of his hamstring suffered while training two weeks later meant that he was again out of the team. He returned to the squad in April towards the end of the season.

After a season curtailed by injuries and being out of favour, Alderweireld again became a regular player for Tottenham in the 2018–19 season. In January 2019, Tottenham took up an option to extend his contract until 2020. He scored an own goal in the last minute in the tightly fought game against Liverpool, losing 2–1.

On 20 December 2019, Alderweireld signed a contract extension to 2023. On 16 February 2020, Alderweireld scored his first goal for the club since May 2017, making amends for an earlier own goal, and helped Tottenham win 3–2 away to Aston Villa. On 12 July 2020, he scored an 81st-minute winner against Arsenal in a North London derby to help his team to a 2–1 victory.

On 2 January 2021, Alderweireld scored his first goal of the 2020–21 season in a 3–0 home win against Leeds United.

=== Al-Duhail ===
On 27 July 2021, Tottenham Hotspur announced that Alderweireld would join Qatar Stars League club Al-Duhail. He made 29 appearances for the side during the 2021–22 season, scoring once in the quarter-final match of their Emir of Qatar Cup-winning campaign, a 4–1 win over Al-Sailiya on 6 March 2022.

=== Royal Antwerp ===
On 15 July 2022, Alderweireld joined Belgian First Division A club Royal Antwerp on a three-year deal. On 30 April 2023, Alderweireld won the Belgian Cup with Antwerp. Just over a month later, on 4 June, Alderweireld scored a goal in the 94th minute of the final match day to secure a dramatic 2–2 draw against Genk, handing Royal Antwerp their first league title in 66 years. The goal denied Genk the title themselves, and came just as Union Saint-Gilloise were conceding three late goals to Club Brugge to deny them also.

On 30 August 2023, he helped the club secure a spot in the group stage of the UEFA Champions League for the first time ever, following a 3–1 aggregate win over AEK Athens in the play-off round.

On 18 November 2024, Alderweireld announced his retirement from professional football at the end of the 2024–25 season, after retiring from international football the previous year. Alderweireld said "I can say with almost certainty that this is my last year, sometimes I'm looking forward to my retirement, but on the other hand I also have a lot of ambition to accelerate with Antwerp. I will do that for another half year. In the meantime, I'm going to try and enjoy every moment"

On 16 March 2025, in the 85th minute of a 0–0 league draw away at Standard Liège, Alderweireld sustained a quadriceps tear that sidelined him for most of the championship playoffs. Royal Antwerp put out a statement reading "Recovery from such injuries often takes a considerable period of time, which unfortunately makes Toby's appearance in the play-offs uncertain. From today on, everything is focused on his rehabilitation. Wishing you a speedy recovery, Captain!". Alderweireld put out his own statement soon after, reading "I never expected this… Right now, I don’t have the words for this. What I do know is that I will do everything I can to wear that beautiful shirt one more time. To be captain of the most beautiful club in the world one more time… It will be a tough battle against time, and I know I’m not on the winning side. I want to thank everyone for the heart-warming messages and the support I’ve received. You are all fantastic!"

On 17 May 2025, Alderweireld returned to action for Antwerp during the penultimate championship playoff match against Union Saint-Gilloise. Later that month, on 29 May, he made his final home appearance in the European competition play-off match against Charleroi.

== International career ==
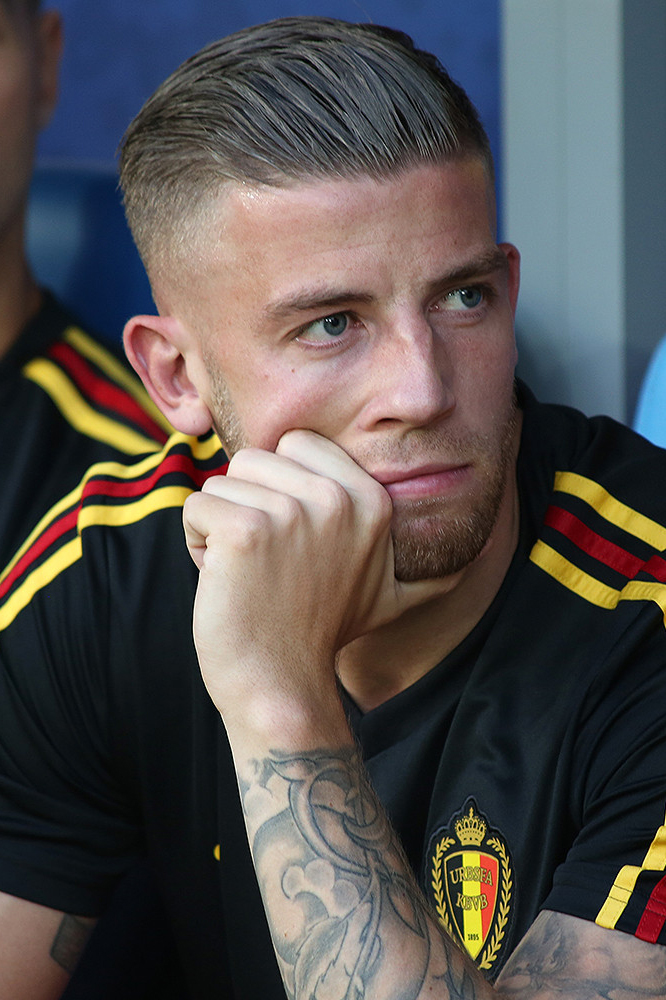
Alderweireld with Belgium at the 2018 FIFA World Cup

Alderweireld first represented Belgium at under-17 level in October 2005 and took part in the 2006 UEFA U17 Championship. After the 2008–09 season concluded, he made his senior debut for Belgium in a friendly tournament, Kirin Cup, against Chile on 29 May 2009. However, his full senior debut came three months later in a match against the Czech Republic. He was named in several 2010 World Cup qualifying squads, but was mostly an unused substitute. In October 2009, he came on as a second-half substitute for Daniel Van Buyten in the 2–0 defeat to Estonia.

Alderweireld was called up to the Belgian U21 squad for the 2011 UEFA U21 Championship qualifier against Ukraine on 13 November 2009, with the match finishing 2–0 to Ukraine. He played right back during the 2012 UEFA Euro qualification match against Turkey on 7 September 2010.

On 13 May 2014, Alderweireld was named in the squad to go to the 2014 FIFA World Cup. He started in all five games of Belgium's tournament run, including its 1–0 defeat against Argentina in the quarter-finals. In the 2018 FIFA World Cup, he won a bronze medal with Belgium after a 2–0 win over England. On 8 September 2020, Alderweireld played his 100th match for Belgium in a 5–1 win against Iceland.

On 10 November 2022, Alderweireld was selected in manager Roberto Martínez's 26-man Belgian squad for the 2022 FIFA World Cup.

On 6 March 2023, Alderweireld announced his retirement from international football.

== Personal life ==
Alderweireld married Shani Van Mieghem in Ekeren, Antwerp on 19 June 2015. They had their first child Ayla born in September 2018. His son Jace was born in February 2020.

In 2025, Alderweireld took part in the fifth season of the Belgian edition of the reality singing competition series The Masked Singer, performing as Oehoe the Owl and being unmasked in the third episode.

== Career statistics ==
=== Club ===
Appearances and goals by club, season and competition
Club	Season	League			National cup (Note: Includes KNVB Cup, Copa del Rey, FA Cup, Emir of Qatar Cup, Belgian Cup)		League cup (Note: Includes EFL Cup)		Continental		Other		Total	
Club	Season	Division	Apps	Goals	Apps	Goals	Apps	Goals	Apps	Goals	Apps	Goals	Apps	Goals
Ajax	2008–09	Eredivisie	5	0	0	0	—		3 (Note: Appearances in UEFA Europa League)	0	—		8	0
Ajax	2009–10	Eredivisie	31	2	6	1	—		8	0	—		45	3
Ajax	2010–11	Eredivisie	26	2	4	0	—		12 (Note: Eight appearances and two goals in UEFA Champions League, four appearances and one goal in UEFA Europa League)	3	1 (Note: Appearance in Johan Cruyff Shield)	0	43	5
Ajax	2011–12	Eredivisie	29	1	3	0	—		7 (Note: Five appearances in UEFA Champions League, two appearances and one goal in UEFA Europa League)	1	1	1	40	3
Ajax	2012–13	Eredivisie	33	2	3	0	—		8 (Note: Six appearances in UEFA Champions League, two appearances and one goal in UEFA Europa League)	1	1	1	45	4
Ajax	2013–14	Eredivisie	4	0	0	0	—		0	0	1	0	5	0
Ajax	Total		128	7	16	1	—		38	5	4	2	186	15
Atlético Madrid	2013–14	La Liga	12	1	6	1	—		4 (Note: Appearances in UEFA Champions League)	0	—		22	2
Southampton (loan)	2014–15	Premier League	26	1	2	0	0	0	—		—		28	1
Tottenham Hotspur	2015–16	Premier League	38	4	1	0	0	0	10	0	—		49	4
Tottenham Hotspur	2016–17	Premier League	30	1	4	0	0	0	5 (Note: Three appearances and one goal in UEFA Champions League, two appearances in UEFA Europa League)	1	—		39	2
Tottenham Hotspur	2017–18	Premier League	14	0	2	0	1	0	4	0	—		21	0
Tottenham Hotspur	2018–19	Premier League	34	0	0	0	4	0	12	0	—		50	0
Tottenham Hotspur	2019–20	Premier League	33	2	3	0	0	0	6	0	—		42	2
Tottenham Hotspur	2020–21	Premier League	25	1	3	0	2	0	5	0	—		35	1
Tottenham Hotspur	Total		174	8	13	0	7	0	42	1	—		236	9
Al-Duhail	2021–22	Qatar Stars League	20	0	4	1	—		5 (Note: Appearances in AFC Champions League)	0	—		29	1
Royal Antwerp	2022–23	Belgian Pro League	36	7	6	0	—		5 (Note: Appearances in UEFA Europa Conference League)	0	—		47	7
Royal Antwerp	2023–24	Belgian Pro League	39	3	6	1	—		7	0	1 (Note: Appearance in Belgian Super Cup)	0	53	4
Royal Antwerp	2024–25	Belgian Pro League	28	3	5	0	—		—		1 (Note: Appearance in Belgian Pro League European play-off)	0	34	3
Royal Antwerp	Total		103	13	17	1	—		12	0	2	0	134	14
Career total			463	30	58	4	7	0	101	6	6	2	635	42

=== International ===
Appearances and goals by national team and year
National team	Year	Apps	Goals
Belgium	2009	4	0
Belgium	2010	6	0
Belgium	2011	5	0
Belgium	2012	5	0
Belgium	2013	11	1
Belgium	2014	13	0
Belgium	2015	9	0
Belgium	2016	12	2
Belgium	2017	8	0
Belgium	2018	15	0
Belgium	2019	10	2
Belgium	2020	6	0
Belgium	2021	14	0
Belgium	2022	9	0
Total		127	5

Belgium score listed first, score column indicates score after each Alderweireld goal.

List of international goals scored by Toby Alderweireld
No.	Date	Venue	Cap	Opponent	Score	Result	Competition
1	19 November 2013	King Baudouin Stadium, Brussels, Belgium	31	Japan	2–3	2–3	Friendly
2	26 June 2016	Stadium Municipal, Toulouse, France	60	Hungary	1–0	4–0	UEFA Euro 2016
3	7 October 2016	King Baudouin Stadium, Brussels, Belgium	64	Bosnia and Herzegovina	3–0	4–0	2018 FIFA World Cup qualification
4	9 September 2019	Hampden Park, Glasgow, Scotland	94	Scotland	3–0	4–0	UEFA Euro 2020 qualification
5	10 October 2019	King Baudouin Stadium, Brussels, Belgium	95	San Marino	5–0	9–0	UEFA Euro 2020 qualification

== Honours ==
Ajax

- Eredivisie: 2010–11, 2011–12, 2012–13
- KNVB Cup: 2009–10
- Johan Cruyff Shield: 2013

Atlético Madrid

- La Liga: 2013–14
- UEFA Champions League runner-up: 2013–14

Tottenham Hotspur

- EFL Cup runner-up: 2020–21
- UEFA Champions League runner-up: 2018–19

Al-Duhail

- Emir of Qatar Cup: 2022

Antwerp

- Belgian Pro League: 2022–23
- Belgian Cup: 2022–23; runner-up: 2023–24
- Belgian Super Cup: 2023

Belgium

- FIFA World Cup third place: 2018

Individual

- Ajax Talent of the Year: 2010
- AFC Ajax Club of 100: 2013
- PFA Team of the Year: 2015–16 Premier League
- UEFA Europa League Squad of the Season: 2015–16
- Tottenham Hotspur Player of the Year: 2015–16
- Belgian Golden Shoe: 2023
- Belgian Goal of the Year: 2023

== See also ==
- List of men's footballers with 100 or more international caps
