= Abdurahman Mesaad =

Qatari footballer (born 1996)

Personal information
- Full name: Abdurahman Mesaad Ali Al-Shaqmi
- Date of birth: 14 March 1996 (age 30)
- Place of birth: Qatar
- Position: Midfielder

Team information
- Current team: Al Shahaniya
- Number: 7

Senior career*
Years	Team	Apps	(Gls)
2015–2020	Al-Wakrah	25	(0)
2020–2022	Lusail	18	(4)
2022–	Al Shahaniya	48	(5)
- * Club domestic league appearances and goals as of 17 January 2026

Abdurahman Mesaad (Arabic: عبد الرحمن مسعد; born 14 March 1996) is a Qatari footballer. He currently plays for Al Shahaniya as a midfielder.
