= Rabh Boussafi =

Qatari footballer (born 2000)

Rabh Boussafi رابح بوصافي
Personal information
- Full name: Rabh Yahia Boussafi
- Date of birth: 18 May 2000 (age 26)
- Place of birth: Qatar
- Position: Winger

Team information
- Current team: Al-Gharafa
- Number: 17

Youth career
- Al-Duhail

Senior career*
Years	Team	Apps	(Gls)
2018–	Al-Duhail	19	(3)
2020–2021	→ Umm Salal (loan)	18	(0)
2023	→ Al-Shamal (loan)	11	(1)
2023–2024	→ Al-Wakrah (loan)	19	(1)
2024–	Al-Gharafa	24	(0)

International career^{‡}
2021	Qatar U23	1	(0)
2024–	Qatar	1	(0)
- * Club domestic league appearances and goals as of 17 January 2026 ‡ National team caps and goals as of 27 December 2024

Rabh Boussafi (Arabic:رابح بوصافي) (born 18 May 2000) is a Qatari footballer who plays as a winger for Al-Gharafa. He has also appeared for the Qatar U23 team and the Qatar national team.

== Career ==
Boussafi started his career at Al-Duhail and is a product of the Al-Duhail's youth system. On 17 March 2018, Boussafi made his professional debut for Al-Duhail against Al-Markhiya in the Pro League, replacing Abdelrahman Moustafa.

== Honours ==
=== Club ===
Al-Duhail SC

- Qatar Stars League: 2017-18, 2019-20
- Emir of Qatar Cup: 2018, 2019, 2022
- Qatar Cup: 2018
