= Lucas Shlimon =

Iraqi footballer

Personal information
- Full name: Lucas Sarhaddon Shlimon
- Date of birth: 14 February 2003 (age 23)
- Place of birth: Sweden
- Height: 1.82 m (6 ft 0 in)
- Position: Midfielder

Team information
- Current team: Anagennisi Karditsa
- Number: 6

Youth career
- 2017–2020: Jönköpings Södra IF

Senior career*
Years	Team	Apps	(Gls)
2020–2022	Assyriska IK	38	(0)
2022–2025	Örebro SK	76	(1)
2025–2026	Assyriska FF	11	(4)
2026	Egaleo	11	(1)
2026–	Anagennisi Karditsa	0	(0)

International career^{‡}
2022	Sweden U19	3	(0)
2024–	Iraq	4	(0)
- * Club domestic league appearances and goals as of 25 April 2026 ‡ National team caps and goals as of 25 March 2025

Lucas Sarhaddon Shlimon (Arabic: لوكاس سليمان; born 14 February 2003) is a professional footballer who plays as a midfielder for Super League Greece 2 club Anagennisi Karditsa. Born in Sweden and of Assyrian ethnicity, he represents the Iraq national team.

== Club career ==
Shlimon is a youth product of the Swedish club Jönköpings Södra IF. In the summer of 2020, he transferred to Assyriska IK in the Ettan. In his second season with the club he played 26 games and was named Talent of the Year in the Ettan. On 7 January 2022, he transferred to the Superettan club Örebro SK on a 3-year contract. On 19 February 2024, he extended his contract with Örebro SK over the 2025 season.

== International career ==
Shlimon was born in Sweden to Iraqi parents, and moved to Sweden at a young age - he holds both Iraqi and Swedish citizenships. He is a former youth international for Sweden, having played for the Sweden U19s in 2022. In October 2024, he was called up to the senior Iraq national team for a set of 2026 FIFA World Cup qualification matches. On 10 October 2024, he made his debut with Iraq as a substitute in a 1–0 win over Palestine.
