= Saleh Al-Yahri =

Qatari association football player (born 1995)

Saleh Al-Yahri صالح اليهري
Personal information
- Full name: Saleh Mohammed Al-Yahri
- Date of birth: 30 May 1995 (age 31)
- Place of birth: Qatar
- Height: 1.79 m (5 ft 10 in)
- Position: Defender

Team information
- Current team: Al-Markhiya
- Number: 31

Youth career
- Al-Gharafa

Senior career*
Years	Team	Apps	(Gls)
2016–	Al-Markhiya	-	(-)
2019–2020	→ Al-Shahania (loan)	19	(0)
2020–2021	→ AL-Wakrah (loan)	4	(0)
- * Club domestic league appearances and goals

Saleh Al-Yahri (Arabic:صالح اليهري) (born 30 May 1995) is a Qatari footballer. He currently plays for Al-Markhiya as a defender .

== Career ==
=== Al-Gharafa ===
Al-Yahri started his career at Al-Gharafa and is a product of the Al-Gharafa's youth system.

=== Al-Markhiya ===
On 2016-2017 Season left Al-Gharafa and signed with Al-Markhiya. On 16 September 2017, Al-Yahri made his professional debut for Al-Markhiya against Al-Sadd in the Pro League, and the team won 2-0 However, the Disciplinary Committee of the Football Association decided to adopt the club Al-Sadd victory over Al-Markhiya with three clean goals, after the illegal participation of the arrested player Saleh Al-Yahri against Al-Sadd . On 13 June 2018, renewed his contract with Al-Markhiya.

=== Al-Shahania (loan) ===
On 23 July 2019, left Al-Markhiya and signed with Al-Shahania on loan of the season. On 22 August 2018, Al-Yahri made his professional debut for Al-Shahania against Al-Gharafa in the Pro League .

=== Al-Wakrah (loan) ===
On 4 November 2020, left Al-Markhiya and signed with Al-Shahania on loan of the season.
