= Sayed Al-Wadaei =

Bahraini footballer (born 2008)

Personal information
- Full name: Sayed Ahmed Alaa Ahmed Al-Wadaei
- Date of birth: 8 July 2008 (age 18)
- Place of birth: Manama, Bahrain
- Position: Forward

Team information
- Current team: Villarreal

Youth career
- Manama
- Villarreal

International career^{‡}
Years	Team	Apps	(Gls)
2024–	Bahrain	1	(0)
- ‡ National team caps and goals as of 30 July 2025

Sayed Ahmed Alaa Ahmed Al-Wadaei (Arabic: سيد الوادعي; born 8 July 2008) is a Bahraini footballer who plays as a forward for Villarreal and the Bahrain national team. Known for his youth and skills scouted by the Villarreal academy at a young age age, Sayed Ahmed has won the gulf cup with the Bahraini national team.

== Early life ==
Al-Wadaei was born on 8 July 2008. Born in Manama, Bahrain, he is the son of Amina Al-Asfour.

== Club career ==
Al-Wadaei joined the youth academy of Bahraini side Manama at the age of seven. Following his stint there, he joined the youth academy of Spanish La Liga side Villarreal, helping the under-16 team win the 2024 Villarreal Academy Cup and achieve second place at the 2024 Yellow Yellow Cup, where he was the top scorer.

== International career ==
Al-Wadaei is a Bahrain international. On 28 December 2024, he debuted for the Bahrain national football team during a 1-2 loss to the Yemen national football team in the Gulf Cup. Eventually, Bahrain won the 26th Arabian Gulf Cup.

== Honours ==
Bahrain

- Arabian Gulf Cup: 2024–25
