= Zé Nando =

Portuguese footballer

José Fernando da Silva Gonçalves (born 21 April 1975), commonly known as Zé Nando, is a Portuguese retired footballer who played as a left back.

== Club career ==
In his extensive career, Penafiel-born Zé Nando played for hometown's F.C. Penafiel (his first and his last club, where he started professionally in 1994), Leça F.C. (1998–99), Gil Vicente F.C. (1999–2000), F.C. Paços de Ferreira (2000–04) and Vitória de Guimarães (2004–05).

Additionally, he played three years in Cyprus with AEK Larnaca FC (2005–07) and AEL Limassol (2007–08), and amassed Primeira Liga totals of 128 games and two goals, both scored for Paços. He retired from football in June 2010 at the age of 35, continuing to work with Penafiel as a coach.
