= Sayyar Ahmadabad =

Sayyar Ahmadabad سياراحمداباد
- Village
- Location within Iran
- Coordinates: 31°23′54″N 48°13′36″E
- Country: Iran
- Province: Khuzestan
- County: Hoveyzeh
- Bakhsh: Central
- Rural District: Hoveyzeh

Population (2006)
  - Total: 264
- Time zone: UTC+3:30 (IRST)
  - Summer (DST): UTC+4:30 (IRDT)

Sayyar Ahmadabad (Persian: سياراحمداباد, also Romanized as Sayyār Aḩmadābād) is a village in Hoveyzeh Rural District, in the Central District of Hoveyzeh County, Khuzestan Province, Iran. At the 2006 census, its population was 264, in 45 families.

Sayyar Ahmadabad-e Movali (Persian: سياراحمدابادموالي, also Romanized as Sayyār Aḩmadābād-e Movālī; also known as Sayyār Aḩmadābād and Sayyār-e Movālī) is nearby or identical. At the 2006 census, its population was 313, in 49 families.
