= Ghanem Haddaf =

Qatari footballer (born 1991)

Personal information
- Full name: Ghanem Haddaf Al-Qahtani
- Date of birth: 27 September 1991 (age 35)
- Place of birth: Qatar
- Position: Midfielder

Senior career*
Years	Team	Apps	(Gls)
2010–2024	Al-Sailiya	79	(0)
- * Club domestic league appearances and goals

Ghanem Haddaf (Arabic:غانم هداف) (born 27 September 1991) is a Qatari professional footballer who plays as a midfielder.

== Honours ==
=== Club ===
Al-Sailiya SC

- Qatar FA Cup: 2021
- Qatari Stars Cup: 2020-21, 2021-22
