= Motasem Al Bustami =

Jordanian footballer (born 1999)

Personal information
- Full name: Motasem Majed Al Bustami
- Date of birth: 6 June 1999 (age 27)
- Place of birth: Jordan
- Position: Goalkeeper

Team information
- Current team: Qatar
- Number: 31

Youth career
- El Jaish

Senior career*
Years	Team	Apps	(Gls)
2018–	Qatar SC	19	(0)
- * Club domestic league appearances and goals

Motasem Al Bustami is a Jordanian footballer who plays as a goalkeeper for Qatar Stars League side Qatar SC.
