= Mohammed Sayyar =

Bahraini footballer (born 1991)

Personal information
- Full name: Mohammed Bader Sayyar
- Date of birth: 16 February 1991 (age 35)
- Place of birth: Bahrain
- Height: 1.72 m (5 ft 7 1/2 in)
- Positions: Midfielder; defender

Team information
- Current team: Al Shahaniya
- Number: 4

Youth career
- Al-Gharafa

Senior career*
Years	Team	Apps	(Gls)
2009–2014	Al-Gharafa	16	(0)
2014–2017	Al Shahaniya	44	(3)
2017–2018	Al-Khor	17	(0)
2018–2020	Al-Rayyan	8	(0)
2020–2024	Al-Arabi	41	(1)
2024–	Al Shahaniya	33	(2)
- * Club domestic league appearances and goals as of 17 January 2026

Mohammed Sayyar (Arabic:محمد سيار, born 16 February 1991) is a Bahraini footballer who plays for Al Shahaniya as a midfielder or defender.
