= Shehab Ellethy =

Qatari footballer (born 2000)

Personal information
- Full name: Shehab Mamdouh Mamdouh Abdelfadel Ellethy
- Date of birth: 18 April 2000 (age 26)
- Position: Goalkeeper

Team information
- Current team: Al Shahaniya
- Number: 99

Youth career
- –2017: Aspire Academy

Senior career*
Years	Team	Apps	(Gls)
2017–2025	Al-Duhail	20	(0)
2019–2021	→ Al-Kharaitiyat (loan)	37	(0)
2024–2025	→ Al Shahaniya (loan)	19	(0)
2025–	Al Shahaniya	22	(0)

International career^{‡}
2018	Qatar U19	1	(0)
2018–2021	Qatar U20	4	(0)
2024–	Qatar	1	(0)
- * Club domestic league appearances and goals as of 14:13, 7 June 2026 (UTC) ‡ National team caps and goals as of 22:04, 11 June 2024 (UTC)

Shehab Mamdouh Mamdouh Abdelfadel Ellethy (Arabic: شهاب ممدوح ممدوح عبد الفضل الليثي; born 18 April 2000) is a Qatari footballer who plays as a goalkeeper for Al Shahaniya and the Qatar national team.

== Career statistics ==
=== Club ===
As of 29 May 2019.

Club	Season	League			Cup		Continental		Other		Total	
Club	Season	Division	Apps	Goals	Apps	Goals	Apps	Goals	Apps	Goals	Apps	Goals
Al-Duhail	2017–18	Qatar Stars League	1	0	0	0	–		0	0	1	0
Al-Duhail	2018–19	Qatar Stars League	0	0	1 (Note: Appearances in the Qatar Cup)	0	–		0	0	1	0
Career total			1	0	1	0	0	0	0	0	2	0
