= Abdulaziz Al-Yahri =

Qatari footballer (born 1990)

Personal information
- Full name: Abdulaziz Mohammed Al-Yahri
- Date of birth: 26 June 1990 (age 36)
- Place of birth: Qatar
- Position: Winger

Team information
- Current team: Al-Markhiya
- Number: 10

Youth career
- –2009: Umm Salal

Senior career*
Years	Team	Apps	(Gls)
2009–2014	Umm Salal	35	(5)
2014–2015	Al Ahli	16	(0)
2015–2020	Umm Salal	40	(4)
2020–2025	Al Shahaniya		
2025–	Al-Markhiya		

International career
2011	Qatar	1	(0)
- * Club domestic league appearances and goals as of 25 January 2020

Abdulaziz Mohammed Al-Yahri (Arabic: عبد العزيز اليهري; born 26 June 1990) is a Qatari international footballer who plays for Al-Markhiya as a winger.
