= Adel Al-Sulaimane =

Qatari footballer (born 1995)

Personal information
- Full name: Adel Alawi Abdoh Al-Sulaimane
- Date of birth: 25 August 1995 (age 31)
- Place of birth: Qatar
- Position: Midfielder

Youth career
- ASPIRE

Senior career*
Years	Team	Apps	(Gls)
2014–2025	Umm Salal	182	(4)
2019–2020	→ Al-Wakrah (loan)	7	(0)
2025–2026	Al-Shamal	3	(0)
- * Club domestic league appearances and goals

Adel Al-Sulaimane (Arabic: عادل السليماني; born 25 August 1995) is a Qatari footballer. He currently plays for as a midfielder.
