= Abdelaziz Mitwali =

Egyptian footballer (born 1996)

Abdelaziz Mitwali عبد العزيز متولي
Personal information
- Full name: Abdelaziz Khaled Saad Mitwali
- Date of birth: 20 March 1996 (age 30)
- Place of birth: Egypt
- Position: Right-back

Team information
- Current team: Al-Sailiya (on loan from Al-Wakrah)
- Number: 14

Youth career
- Qatar

Senior career*
Years	Team	Apps	(Gls)
2015–2020	Qatar	23	(0)
2018	→ Al-Khor (loan)	6	(0)
2020	→ Al-Khor (loan)	8	(0)
2020–2023	Al-Shamal	40	(0)
2023–2024	Al-Markhiya	6	(0)
2024–	Al-Wakrah	12	(0)
2025	→ Al-Khor (loan)	4	(0)
2025–	→ Al-Sailiya (loan)	0	(0)
- * Club domestic league appearances and goals

Abdelaziz Mitwali (Arabic:عبد العزيز متولي; born 20 March 1996) is an Egyptian footballer who plays as a right back for Al-Sailiya, on loan from Al-Wakrah.

== Career ==
=== Qatar ===
Mitwali started his career at Qatar and is a product of the Qatar youth system. On 9 December 2015, Mitwali made his professional debut for Qatar against Al-Gharafa in the Pro League .

=== Al-Khor (loan) ===
On 1 February 2018, he left Qatar and signed with Al-Khor on loan until the end of the season. On 3 February 2018, Mitwali made his professional debut for Al-Khor against Al-Gharafa in the Pro League .
