= Mohamed Saeed Ibrahim =

Qatari footballer (born 1998)

Mohamed Saeed Ibrahim محمد سعيد إبراهيم
Personal information
- Full name: Mohamed Saeed Ibrahim Abulkhair
- Date of birth: 17 January 1998 (age 28)
- Place of birth: Qatar
- Position: Goalkeeper

Team information
- Current team: Al-Arabi
- Number: 30

Youth career
- Aspire Academy
- Al-Wakrah

Senior career*
Years	Team	Apps	(Gls)
2018–2024	Al-Wakrah	13	(0)
2020	→ Al-Markhiya (loan)	1	(0)
2023–2024	→ Al-Duhail (loan)	0	(0)
2024–	Al-Arabi	2	(0)
- * Club domestic league appearances and goals as of 17 January 2026

Mohamed Saeed Ibrahim Abulkhair (Arabic: محمد سعيد إبراهيم أبو الخير; born 17 January 1998) is a Qatari professional footballer who plays as a goalkeeper for the Qatar Stars League side Al-Arabi.
