= Mohammed Alaaeldin =

Egyptian footballer

Personal information
- Full name: Mohammed Alaaeldin Abdelmotaal
- Date of birth: 24 January 1994 (age 32)
- Place of birth: Egypt
- Height: 1.89 m (6 ft 2 in)
- Position: Right-back

Team information
- Current team: Al-Wakrah
- Number: 27

Senior career*
Years	Team	Apps	(Gls)
2012–2021	Al-Rayyan	113	(2)
2021–2023	Al-Duhail	19	(0)
2023–2025	Al-Arabi	8	(0)
2025	Qatar	0	(0)
2025–	Al-Wakrah	5	(0)
- * Club domestic league appearances and goals as of 17 January 2026

Mohammed Alaaeldin Abdelmotaal (Arabic:محمد علاء الدين; born 20 February 1995) is an Egyptian footballer who currently plays for Al-Wakrah as a right back.
