= Abdelrahman Moustafa =

Qatari association football player (born 1997)

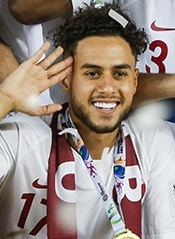
- Moustafa celebrating Qatar's win at the 2019 AFC Asian Cup

Personal information
- Full name: Abdelrahman Mohamed Fahmi Moustafa
- Date of birth: 5 April 1997 (age 29)
- Place of birth: Cairo, Egypt
- Height: 1.68 m (5 ft 6 in)
- Position: Winger

Team information
- Current team: Al Ahli (on loan from Al-Duhail)
- Number: 11

Youth career
- Aspire Academy

Senior career*
Years	Team	Apps	(Gls)
2016–	Al-Duhail	34	(9)
2018–2020	→ Al-Ahli (loan)	26	(6)
2021	→ Al-Wakrah (loan)	7	(3)
2021	→ Al-Arabi (loan)	12	(1)
2024	→ Al-Markhiya (loan)	10	(0)
2024–	→ Al-Ahli (loan)	23	(2)

International career^{‡}
2016	Qatar U19	3	(0)
2016–2021	Qatar U23	8	(0)
2018–	Qatar	4	(0)
Medal record
Men's football
Representing Qatar
AFC Asian Cup
Winner	2019 UAE	Team
- * Club domestic league appearances and goals as of 17 January 2026 ‡ National team caps and goals as of 10 September 2024

Abdelrahman Mohamed Fahmi Moustafa (Arabic: عَبْد الرَّحْمٰن مُحَمَّد فَهْمِيّ مُصْطَفَى; born 5 April 1997) is a professional footballer who plays as a winger for Qatar Stars League club Al Ahli, on loan from Al-Duhail. Born in Egypt, he plays for the Qatar national team.

He represented Qatar in their victorious 2019 AFC Asian Cup campaign.

== Career statistics ==
=== International ===
As of 4 October 2022

Qatar
Year	Apps	Goals
2018	1	0
2022	1	0
2024	2	0
Total	4	0

== Honours ==
=== Club ===
Al-Duhail

- Qatar Stars League: 2016–17, 2017–18
- Emir of Qatar Cup: 2016, 2018
- Qatar Cup: 2018
- Qatari Sheikh Jassim Cup: 2016

=== International ===
Qatar

- AFC Asian Cup: 2019
