= Étoile Sportive du Sahel =

Association football club in Tunisia

- Full name: Étoile Sportive du Sahel
- Nicknames: L'Étoile; Hamra & Bidha (The Red & White); Jawharat El-Sahel (Pearl of the Coast)
- Short name: ESS
- Founded: 12 May 1925; 101 years ago
- Ground: Sousse Olympic Stadium
- Capacity: 50,000
- Chairman: Karim Akrout
- Manager: Christian Bracconi
- League: Tunisian Ligue Professionnelle 1
- 2025–26: Ligue 1, 7th of 16
- Website: https://etoile-du-sahel.com
Home colours	Away colours	Third colours

Étoile Sportive du Sahel (Arabic: النجم الرياضي الساحلي), known as ES Sahel or simply ESS for short, is a Tunisian football club based in Sousse in the Sahel region of Tunisia. Their home stadium, Sousse Olympic Stadium, has a capacity of 50,000 spectators. The club is currently playing in the Tunisian Ligue Professionnelle 1, the Tunisian top-flight football league.

The club was founded on 11 May 1925 after a general meeting under the chairmanship of Chedly Boujemla, Ali Laârbi and Ahmed Zeglaoui, at the headquarters of the Association of the ancient French-Arab School in Laroussi Zarouk Street, in the heart of the old town of Sousse. The aim of the meeting was to establish a sports education society. The Tunisian flag was chosen in the selection of the colors of the team. The red shirt with the star and the white shorts. The French colonial authorities prevented the use of these colors, but with the insistence of the team leaders they prevailed and in the latter they played this kit. In English the name means Sport (or Athletic) Star of the Sahel (coast).

On the continental side, Étoile du Sahel has won 9 trophies of competitions of the Confederation of African Football, more than any other Tunisian team. The club has 1 CAF Champions League, 2 CAF Cups, 2 CAF Super Cups titles, 2 CAF Confederation Cups titles and 2 African Cup Winners' Cups.

Internationally, Étoile du Sahel was the first Tunisian club to participate in the FIFA Club World Cup. They competed in the fifth edition that took place in 2007 in Japan. The club became the second club to reach the FIFA Club World semi-final as the representative of CAF, after Al Ahly SC in 2006, as they defeated Pachuca CF at the quarter-final of 2007 FIFA Club World Cup.

== History ==
=== Beginnings (1925–1931) ===
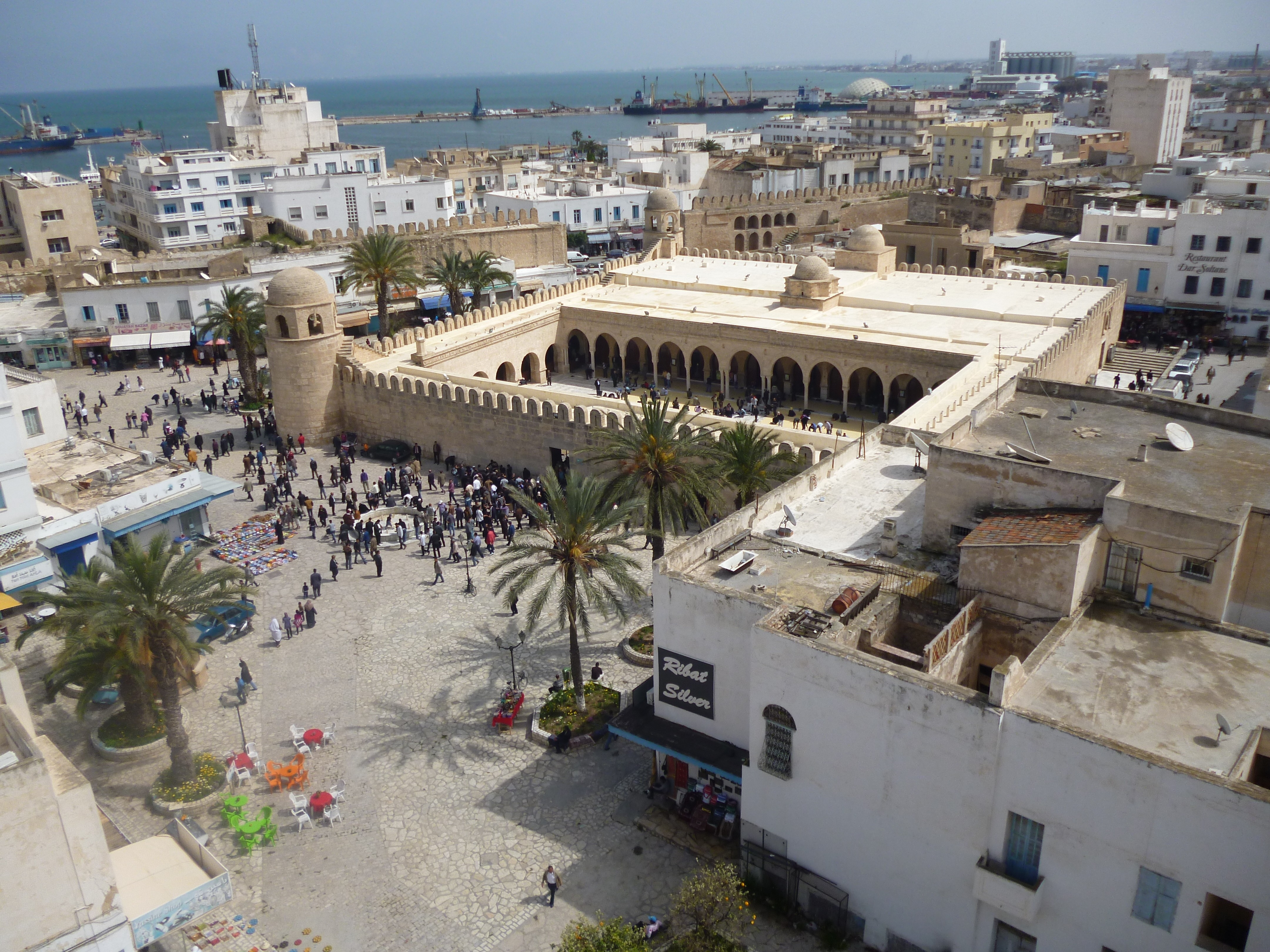
Old town of Sousse where the team was founded

The club was founded during a public meeting at the French-Tunisian school on Laroussi Zarrouk Street, in Sousse. Chedli Boujemla was elected as the first chairman of the multi-sport club. La Soussienne and La Musulmane ("The Muslim") were rejected as club names in favor of Etoile Sportive. Club members eventually settled on Etoile Sportive du Sahel to reflect the goal of representing a broader region than Sousse alone. The Protectorate administration officially recognized the club on 17 July 1925. In March 1926, Ali Larbi became chairman of the soccer section of the club, which entered the Tunisian Football Federation.

Its first team members were Mohamed Bouraoui, Abdelkader Ben Amor, Abdelhamid Baddaï, Sadok Zmentar, Ali Guermachi, Mohamed Mtir, Benaïssa Hicheri, Béchir Dardour et Tahar Kenani.

In March 1926, Ali Laarbi became president of the football section affiliated to the Tunisian Football League (number 4922). After a year of running in which the club played friendly matches, it enters the Honor Promotion Division Center, which corresponds to the second division ranked under the South-South Division of Honor, which awards the title of regional champion.

ESS played in the final of the national championship against the North Champion. The lineup was: Mohamed Bouraoui, Abdelkader Ben Amor, Abdelhamid Baddai, Sadok Zmentar, Sadok Chalouat, Ali Guermachi, Mohamed Mtir, Benaïssa Hicheri, Bashir Dardour and Tahar Kenani.

The club played the leading roles and matured in 1930–1931, where it won the regional championship and then played against the champions of the Southwest (La Gafsienne) and the South (Club Sportif Gabesien). He entered the honor division to no longer experience a lower division demotion.

=== Stability and improvement (1931–1939) ===
On 25 June 1931, the club held its general meeting early enough to prepare the new season. The elected committee is composed of:

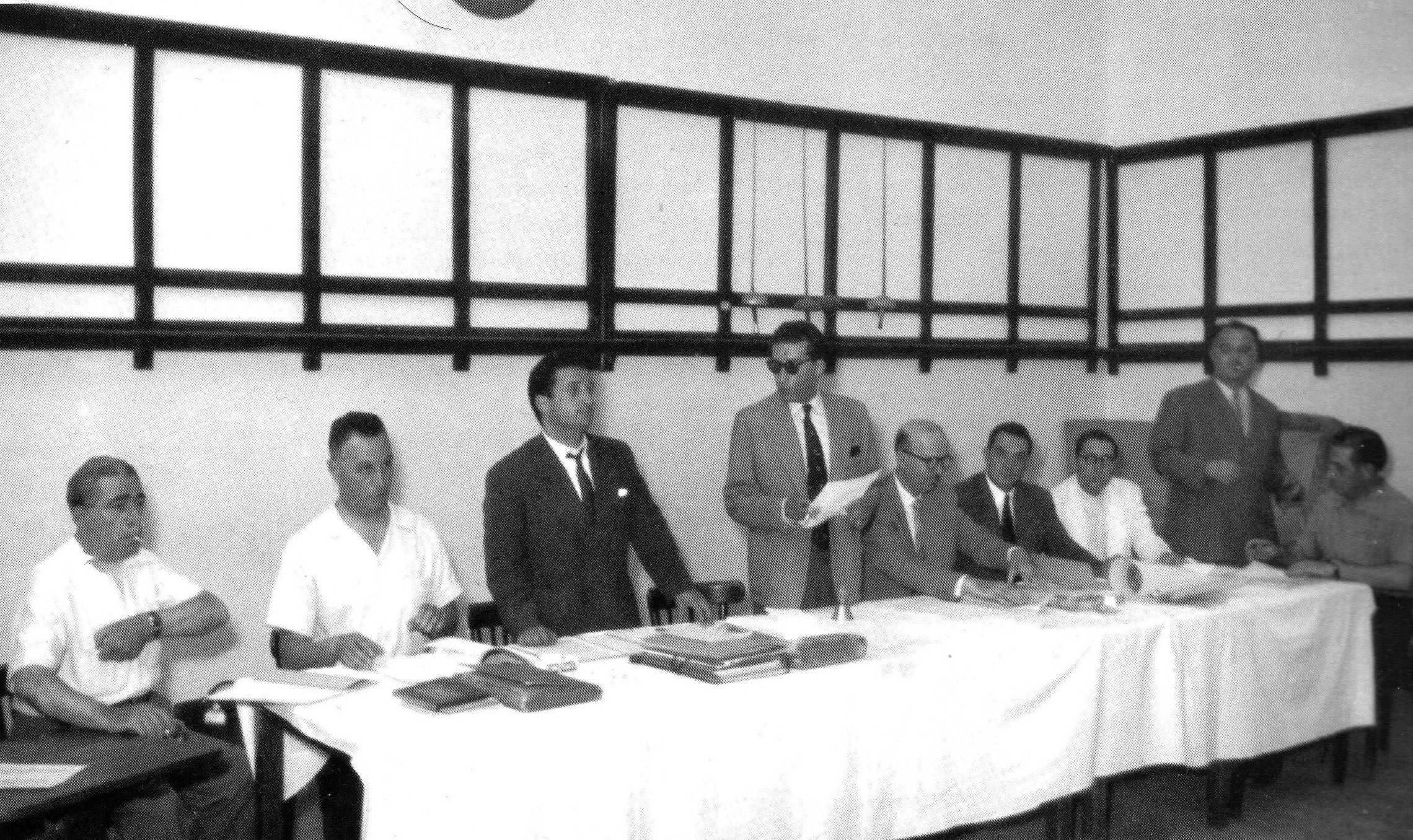
A meeting of the Tunisian Football Association League, which has organized competitions in that period.

- Ali Laâdhari (President)
- Abderrahman Limam and Mustapha Ghachem (vice-president)
- Salah Baddaï (Secretary General)
- Bouraoui Nabli (Assistant Secretary)
- Mohamed Letaïef (treasurer)
- Hassine Kamoun (Assistant Treasurer)
- Ahmed Mlayeh and Salem Ben Hmida (members)

Abdelhamid Baddai is appointed coach. With young Habib Sayeh, Mustapha Ksia, Bouraoui Gnaba and Abdessalem Saad joining in quickly, the club won the district championship by scoring 31 goals in fourteen games and conceding ten goals. But it fails at the national level against the Italia, champion of the North (1–3 with a goal of Bashir Dardour and 2–4 with goals of Sadok Zmentar and Bashir Dardour), after leading 2–0 in the middle. time.

In 1934, he hired for the first time a qualified coach, the first Tunisian to obtain the license of the French Football Federation, Mohamed Boudhina, former coach of Esperance Sports Tunis and former player of FC Metz and AS Nancy. The team improves and reaches the semi-finals of the Tunisian Football Cup in 1937 and the final in 1939.

The Ligue de Tunisie de Football Association (LTFA) which was a Tunisian body affiliated to the French Football Federation has organized the national competitions during this period of the French protectorate of Tunisia.

=== Disruptions (1940–1946) ===
The outbreak of the Second World War disrupts sports activity: the team plays against El Makarem de Mahdia and the Patriote de Sousse in 1941 and a lost final of a Center-South region against the CS Gabèsien in 1942. This period saw the confirmation of great players like Habib Mougou, Sadok Soussi, Abdallah Ghomrasni, Abdelhamid Blal and Aleya Douik. The halting of competitions in the region leads to join the ranks of Grombalia Sports. The team resumed its activity in 1946: they won the Center-South championship but failed against the CA Bizertin in the national final and also lost the final of the Tunisian Cup against the other club of Bizerte, the Patrie Football Club bizertin.

=== Privileged position at the national level (1947–1955) ===
From 1946 to 1947, the Tunisian football championship was organized at the national level. The team that has never left the national division that called "Division of Excellence". In 1947, the team settled in fourth place in the local league in addition to the early exit of the cup from the round of 16 against the US Béja and Habib Mougou scored 13 goals to be the scorer of the team followed by Hamed Douik with 6 goals.

In the following year, ES Sahel maintained the same position in the league and was defeated in the Cup against Patrie Football Club bizertin in the semi-final. Mougou was the team's top scorer for the second year in a row with 11 goals.

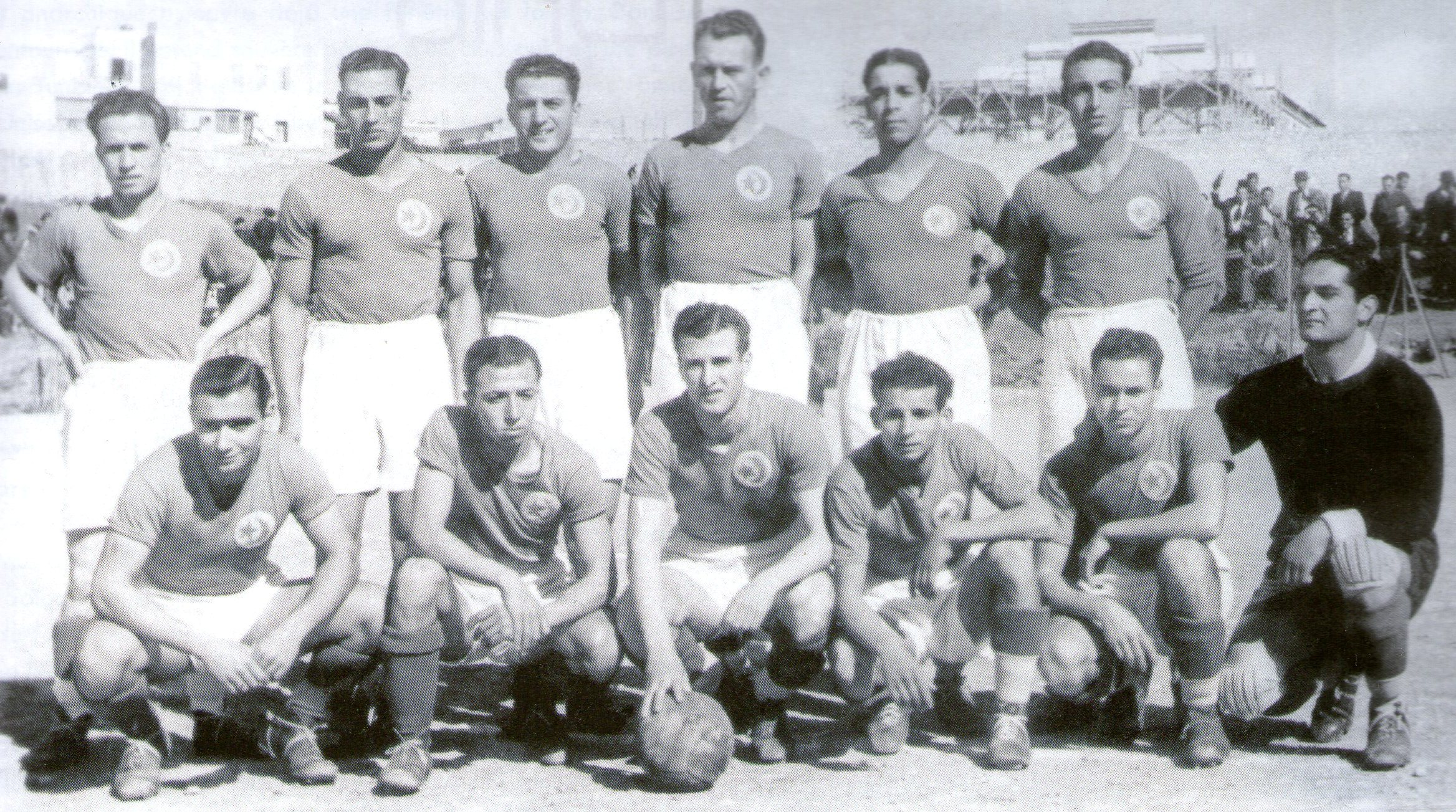
Rachid Sehili sitting (third from the right) managed the team in 1954.

In 1949 the team advanced and a finished second in the tournament and Habib Mougou was again a scorer with 10 goals and withdrew from the cup in the quarter-finals against the CS Hammam-Lif.

The team waited until 1950 to win their first league title, and Habib Mougou was the national league's top scorer with 20 goals, but he lost the cup final to CS Hammam-Lif again. ESS's first major honour was the Tunisian Ligue Professionnelle 1 title in 1950, but they had to wait 8 years to pick it up again.

In the year that followed this season, the team finished sixth in the championship, as was Bechir Jerbi, the team's top scorer, ending the domination of Mogou, in addition to the exit from the quarter-final against CS Hammam-Lif for the third year.

The tournament was interrupted in 1952 because of the political events and the demands for Tunisia's independence from France. This did not prevent the end of the cup competition in which ES Sahel lost to ES Tunis in the quarter-final.

The tournament came back two years later and the team finished in fourth place and Habib Mougou scored 11 goals and the team lost in the cup against CS Hammam-Lif in the final.

In the following year, the team was in the same position finished us the fact that he was defeated in the cup against the same team but from the quarter-finals. Habib also finished the season with 12 goals.

They also reached the quarter-finals of the North African Cup in 1950 by eliminating the Racing de Casablanca, the oldest Moroccan clubs still active.

=== Post-independence and dissolution (1956–1961) ===
After the independence of the country, the club often oscillated between first and third place. He played four successive finals of the Tunisian Cup but won only one, and won the championship in 1958. They won their first Tunisian President Cup in 1959, and completed a league and cup double in 1963.

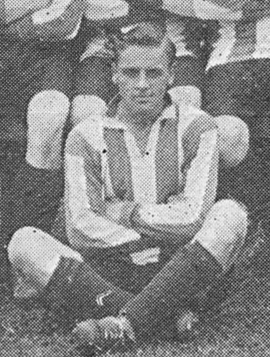
George Berry, the only English coach of the team. He guided ESS to win their first title after the independence.

The team settled in the second place of the Tunisian league which was organized by the Tunisian Football Federation after being organized by the French Football Federation. Habib Mougou has scored 25 goals to be the scorer of the championship, despite not winning the title of how they lost to Club Africain in the Tunisian Cup in the quarterfinals 3–0. In the following year, the team signed with coach George Berry to be the first English coach of the team and the team could get third place in the championship and reached the final of the cup before losing to Espérance de Tunis 2–1.

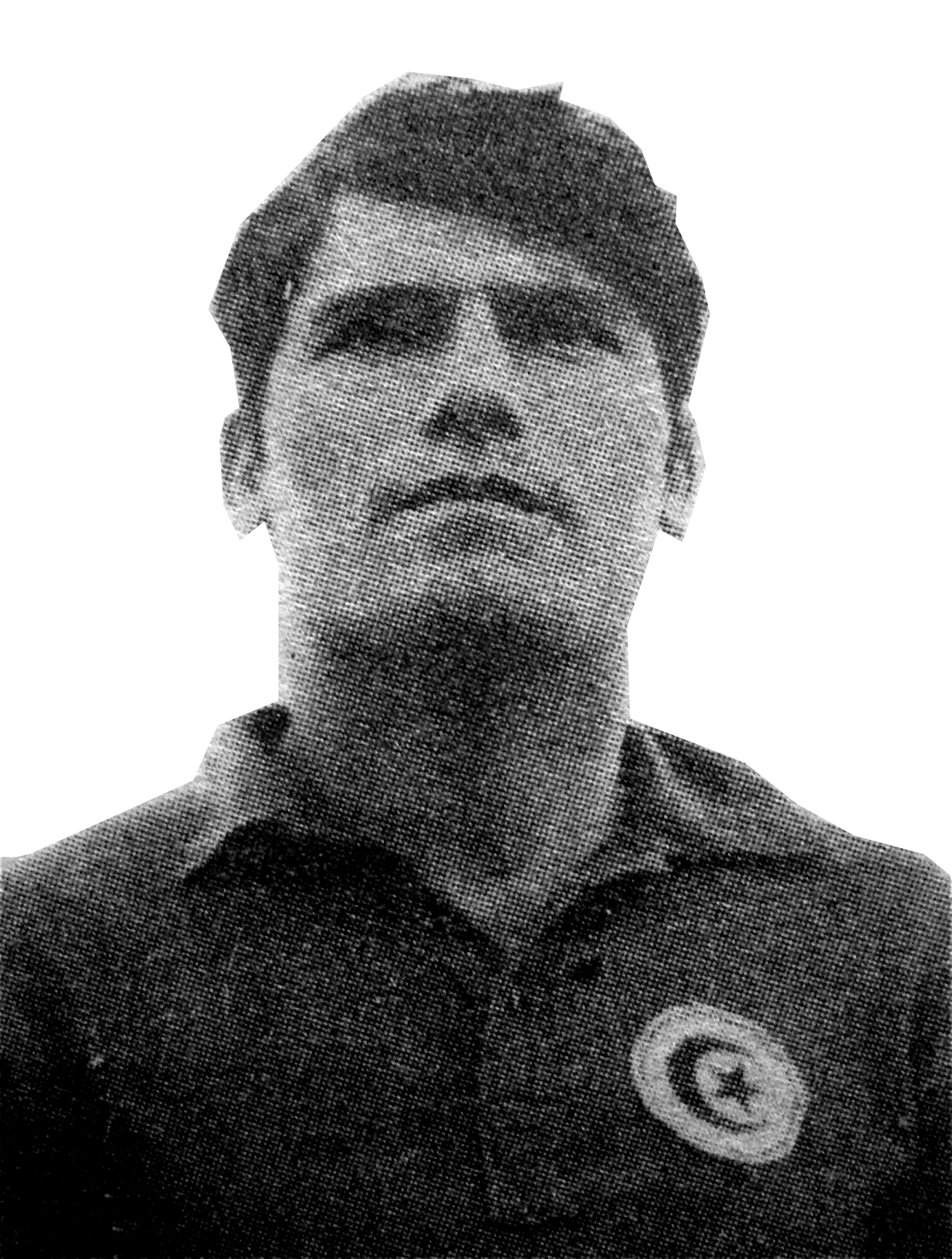
Abdelmajid Chetali in the beginning of his career in 1960.

Berry remained in charge for the season, where ES Sahel won the league title and reached the Tunisian Cup final before losing to Stade Tunisien 2–0. In 1959, the team finished second in the local league, but won the Tunisian Cup for the first time in their history after beating ES Tunis in the final 3–2.

In 1960, the team's level dropped as they finished at the seventh place in the league and was defeated in the Cup final against Stade Tunisien 2–0.

The 1961 season was catastrophic for ES Sahel after being defeated in the Cup from the quarter-final against Esperance 2–0 and the team which was in third place and competing for the title until the round 17 before being dissolved.

His rivalry with Esperance sportive de Tunis unleashes passions and excesses occur after a match lost in the quarterfinals of the Cup in 1961, against the rival of always (0–2). The national authorities then decide to dissolve the club; the youth and sports directorate issued a statement indicating that the President of the Republic received, on 20 March at 5 pm, at his home in Monastir, the steering committee to inform his members of his deep dissatisfaction: that the incidents which occurred during the match in question are likely to feed the animosity and the hatred in the hearts of the young people and to sow discord among them ... As these incidents reached a such as the safety of citizens may be in danger, as the leaders of the association in question have not lived up to their duty and to bring all football officials in Tunisia to meditate on in this example, the President of the Republic has decided – in addition to ongoing legal proceedings – to dissolve the association of the Etoile Sportive du Sahel and to suspend its leaders and players.

=== Outstanding results (1962–1978) ===
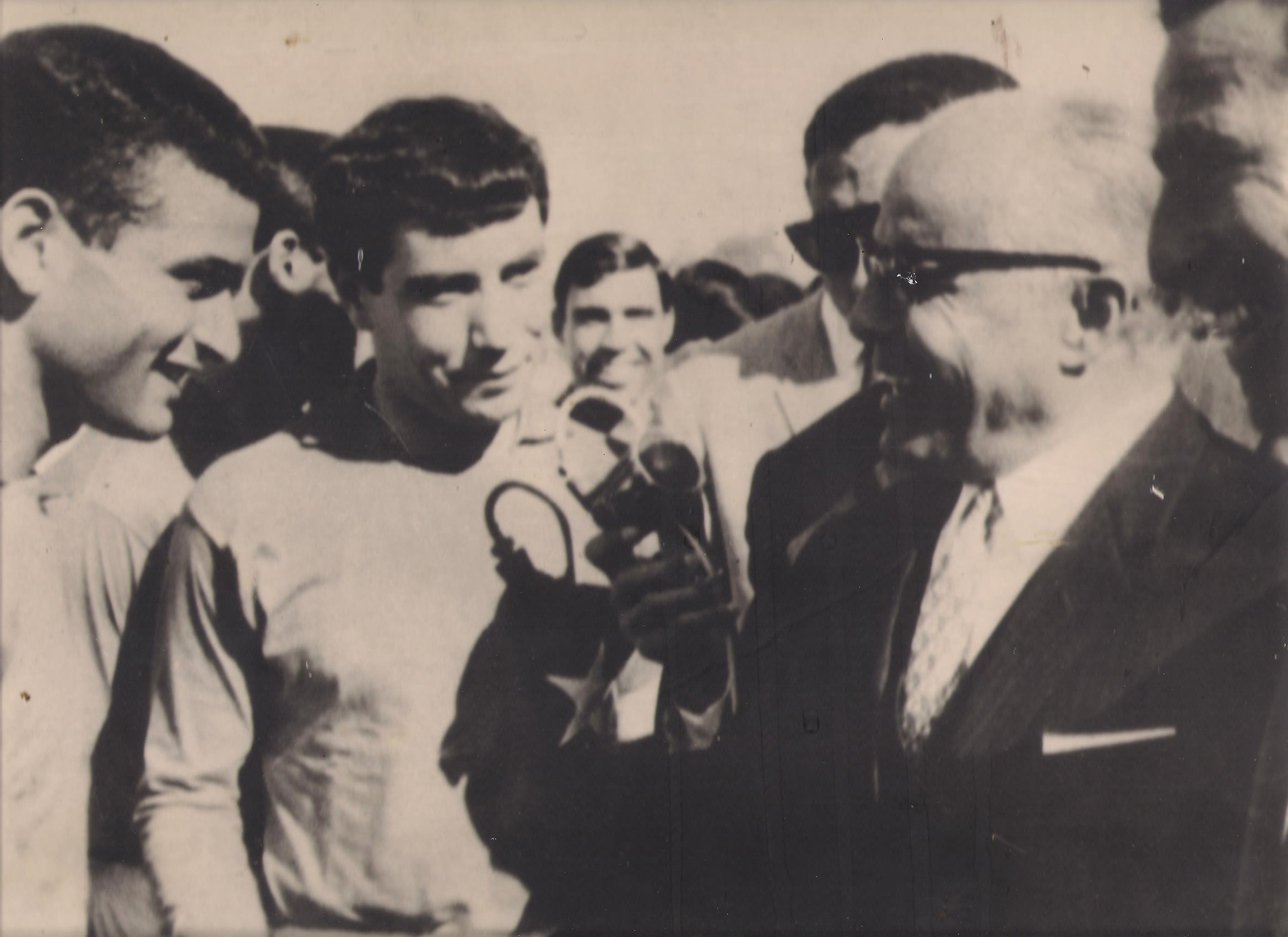
Tunisian president Habib Bourguiba with ESS players in 1966.

Back, after a year of dissolution, it is a period of ostentation during which the club wins titles at the national and Maghreb. Two figures symbolize this period: President Hamed Karoui (1961–1981) and Abdelmajid Chetali, player until 1970 then coach (1971–1978).

The team's return to the competition was accompanied by the arrival of Yugoslavian coach Božidar Drenovac and was able to win the league title and the Tunisian Cup after beating Club Africain 2–1 to achieve the first-ever double for the team. In the next season, the team finished the season in sixth place and defeated them in the quarter-finals of the Cup against Stade Tunisien in the quarter-finals 2–0. Drenovac continued to lead the team to 1965 where they finished third in the league but withdrew from the cup early after the sudden defeat to AS Marsa 1–0 to end the five-year-old Yugoslav coach.

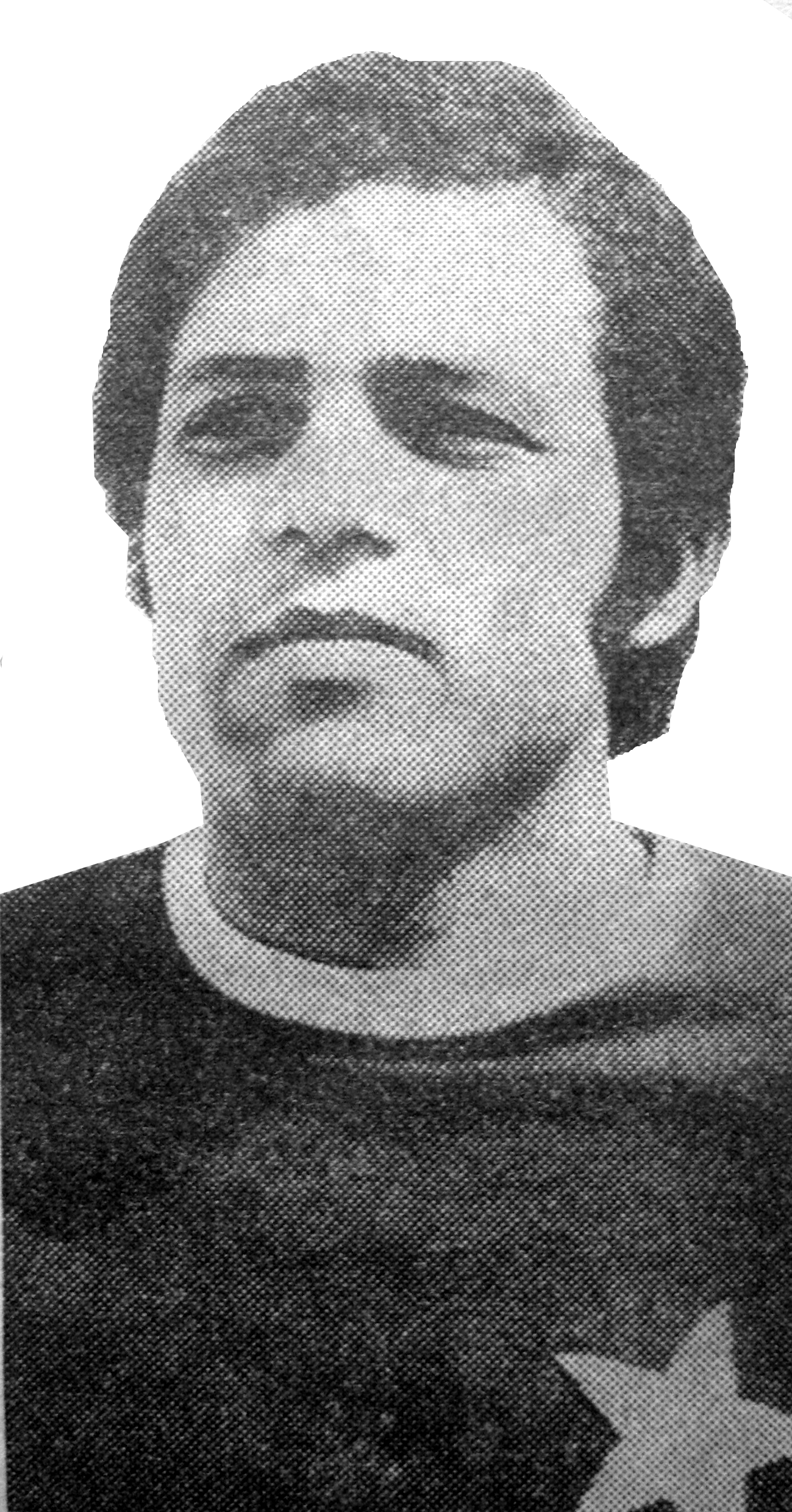
Othman Jenayah in 1973.

The team management continued to recruit foreign coaches to coach Soviet coach Aleksei Paramonov, who won the local league. Habib Akid and Salem Kedadi scored 17 goals as the team's top scorers, but the team lost their quarter-final in the Cup to the future of the game again. In the following year, the team finished second in the tournament and was defeated in the Cup final against Club Africain 2–0, which contributed to the departure of coach Paramonov. The next period was characterized by instability in the coaches by the arrival of Hungarian coach Harzeg where the team finished season in fourth place and withdrew from the cup against Club Africain 1–0 in the round of 32. Former players Bechir Jerbi and Habib Mougou also coached the team in 1969 but the team finished the season in fifth place and came out early in the cup competition against Stade Sportif Sfaxien. Yugoslav coach Dorinovac returned to lead the team, finishing third in the competition and out of the Tunisian Cup against AS Marsa 3–2.

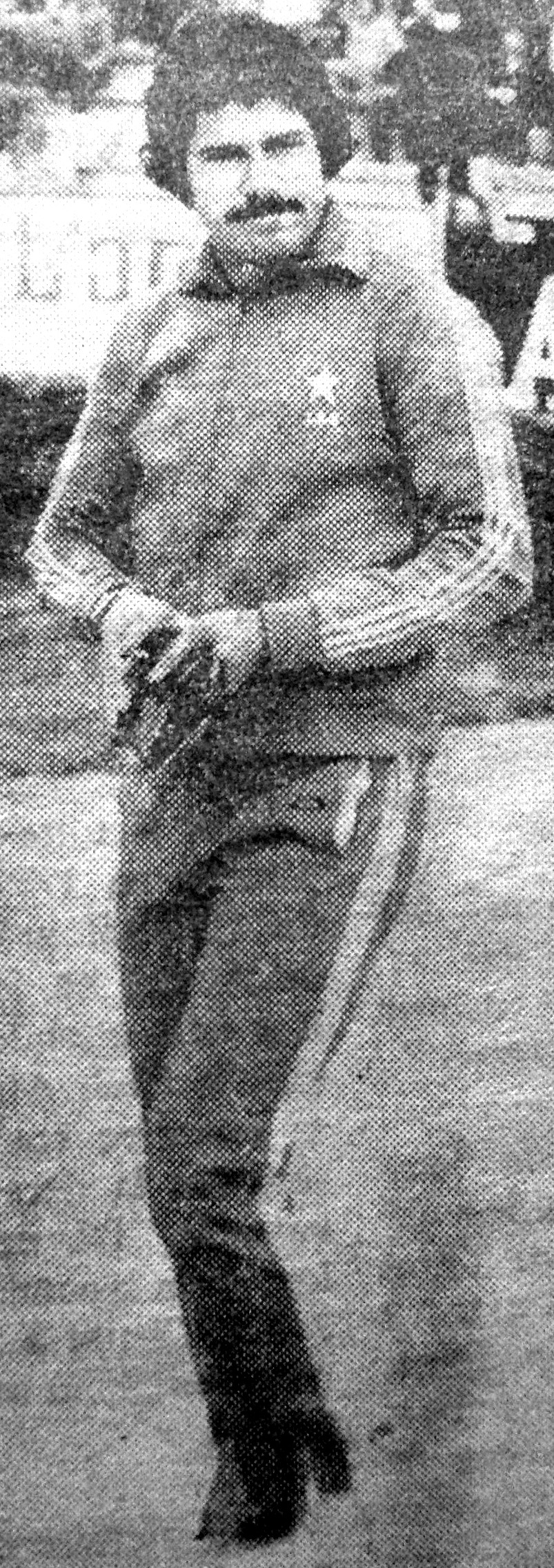
Chetali managing Étoile du Sahel in 1973

In 1970, the club appointed the club's son Abdelmajid Chetali to lead the team and finished the season in fourth place and reached the final of the Cup that was won by Esperance. The coach won in the year following the league title and Adhouma ended the season with nine goals, but the team came out of the cup in the quarter-finals against Club Africain 1–0. In 1973, ES Sahel entered the regional competition and won the Maghreb Champions Cup for the first time in his history after beating Algeria's club CR Belouizdad 2–0. He also won the Tunisian Super Cup for the first time after a 5–2 win over Club Africain. This year was not successful locally after being second in the championship and defeat in the quarter-finals of the Cup against Stade Tunisien 1–0. In 1974 the team finished the season in third place locally. He also won the trophy for the third time by beating Club Africain 1–0. The team also took part in the Maghreb Champions Cup and reached third place after defeating JS Kabylie in the semi-finals on penalties and beating Morocco's KAC Kénitra in third place match 1–0.

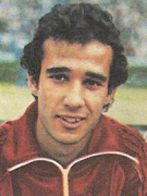
Raouf Ben Aziza in 1978.

In 1975, the team finished third in the season for the second time. The team also won the Cup again by defeating El Makarem de Mahdia in the final 3–0. Which enabled the team to play the Maghreb Cup Winners Cup and win it after overcoming Union Sidi Kacem, MC Alger and SCC Mohammédia in the final, thus ending the period of training of Chetali. The following years have known that the team will continue to play the same way, but this has not been rewarded for winning the trophies despite finishing the season in first place in 1976, but was defeated in a playoff against Espérance de Tunis. The team was defeated also in the semi-final of the cup against Club Africain 1–0. The Soviet coach Paramonov returned to lead the team but the team finished the season as fourth and lost to Club Africain in the final of the Cup 3–1. In 1978, the team finished third in the local championship. The cup competition did not play that year because of the overcrowding of the calendar after Tunisia's qualification for the FIFA World Cup World Cup for the first time in its history in 1978 under the leadership of the son of the team Abdelmajid Chetali.

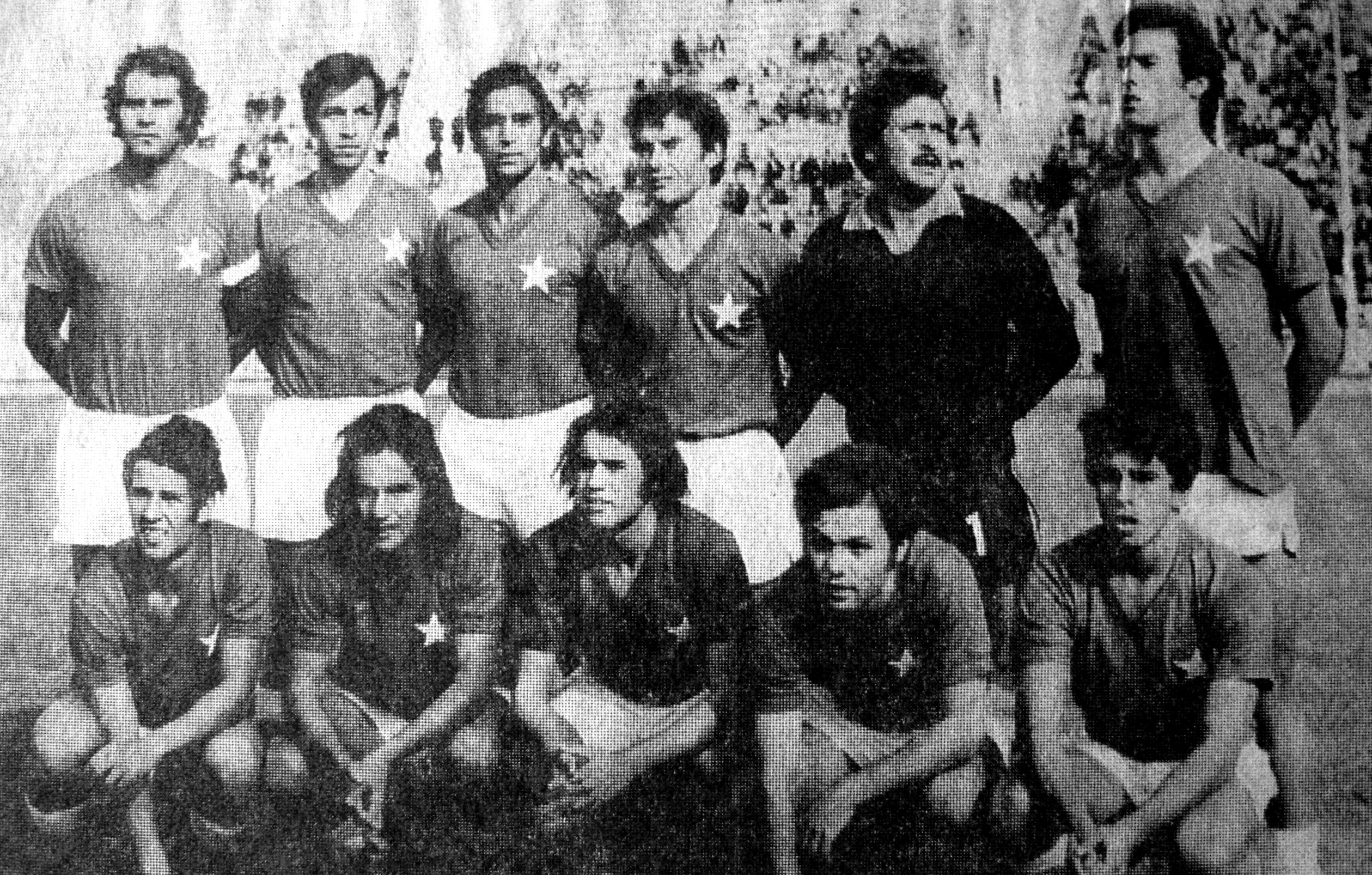
Line-up of the team in 1971

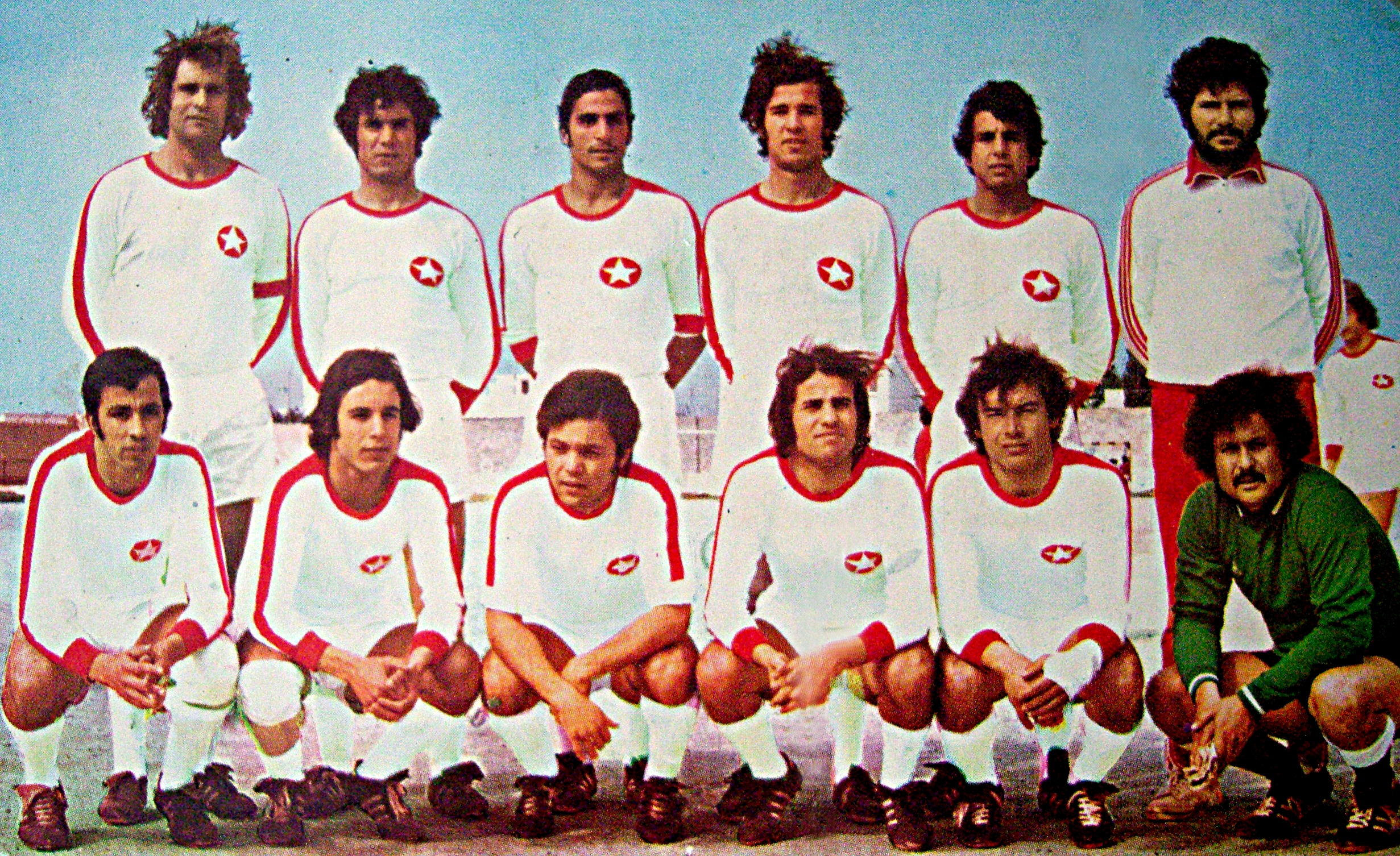
Line-up winning the 1973 Maghreb Champions Cup

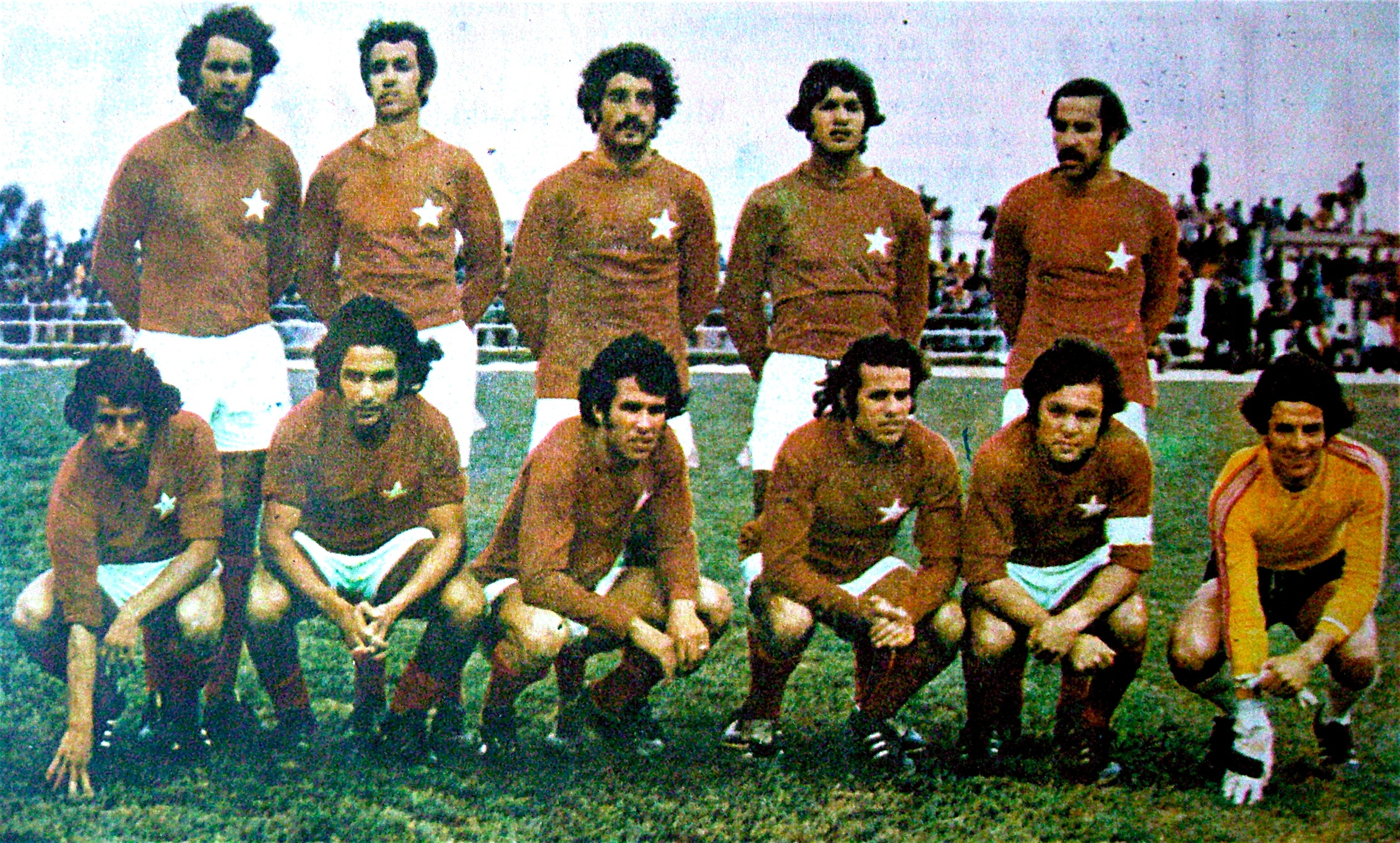
Line-up winning the 1974 Tunisian Cup

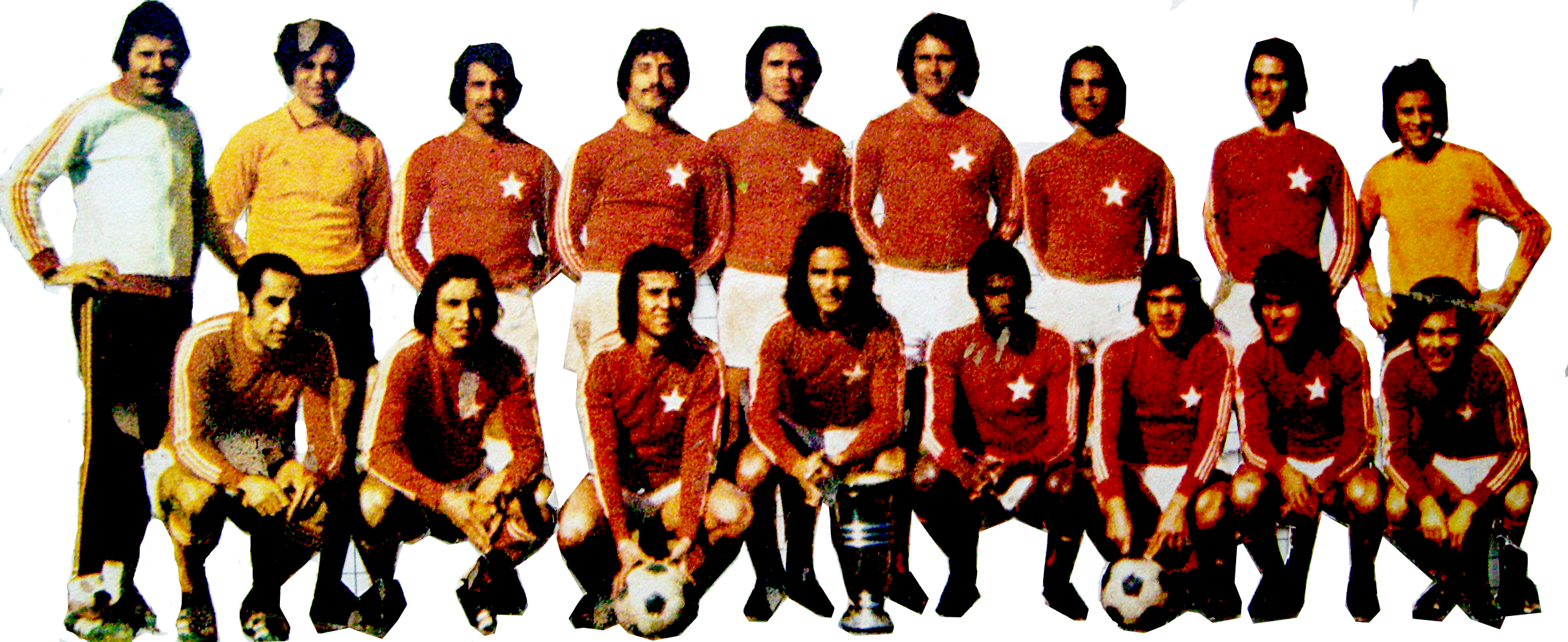
Line-up winning the 1975 Tunisian Cup

=== Local stability (1978–1993) ===
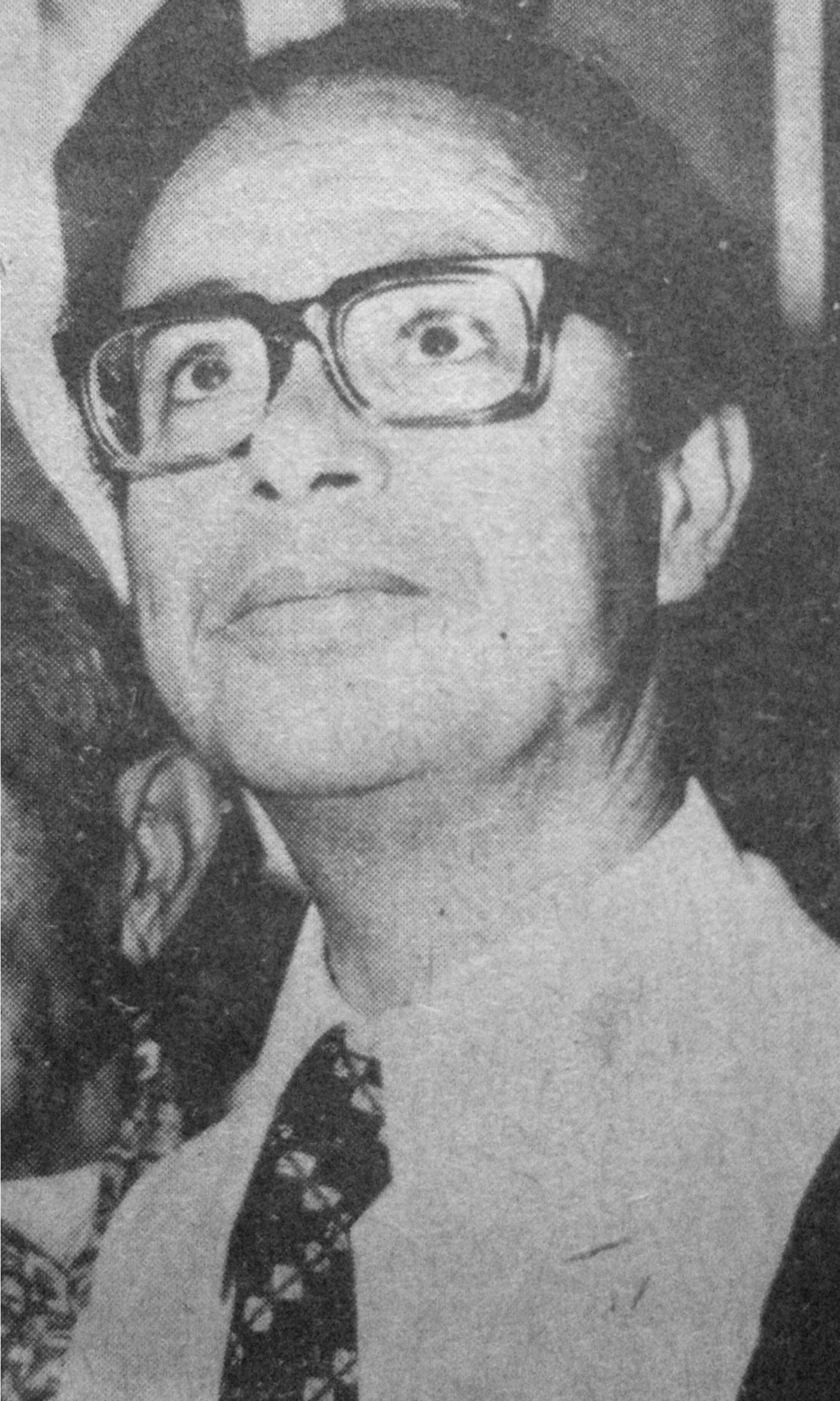
Hamed Karoui during his presidency of the team.

ES Sahel finished in the third place in the local championship and was defeated by JS Kairouan 1–0 in the Tunisian Cup in the round of 16 to leave early. The 1980 season was similar to the previous one after finishing in the same position and went out in the cup of the same round against CS Sfaxien 1–0. In the following season, the president Hamed Karoui left the team to devote himself to political work after 20 years as president of the team. The club's son Mohsen Habacha was also appointed as coach of the team and despite the fact that the team reached fourth place in the league, he won the Tunisian Cup after beating Stade Tunisien 3–1. In 1982, ESS remained in the same positions and finished third in the league and went out in the quarterfinals of the Cup against CA Bizertin 2–1. In 1983, the team came in the sixth place in the local league despite winning the Tunisian Cup after winning the final against the AS Marsa 2–1.

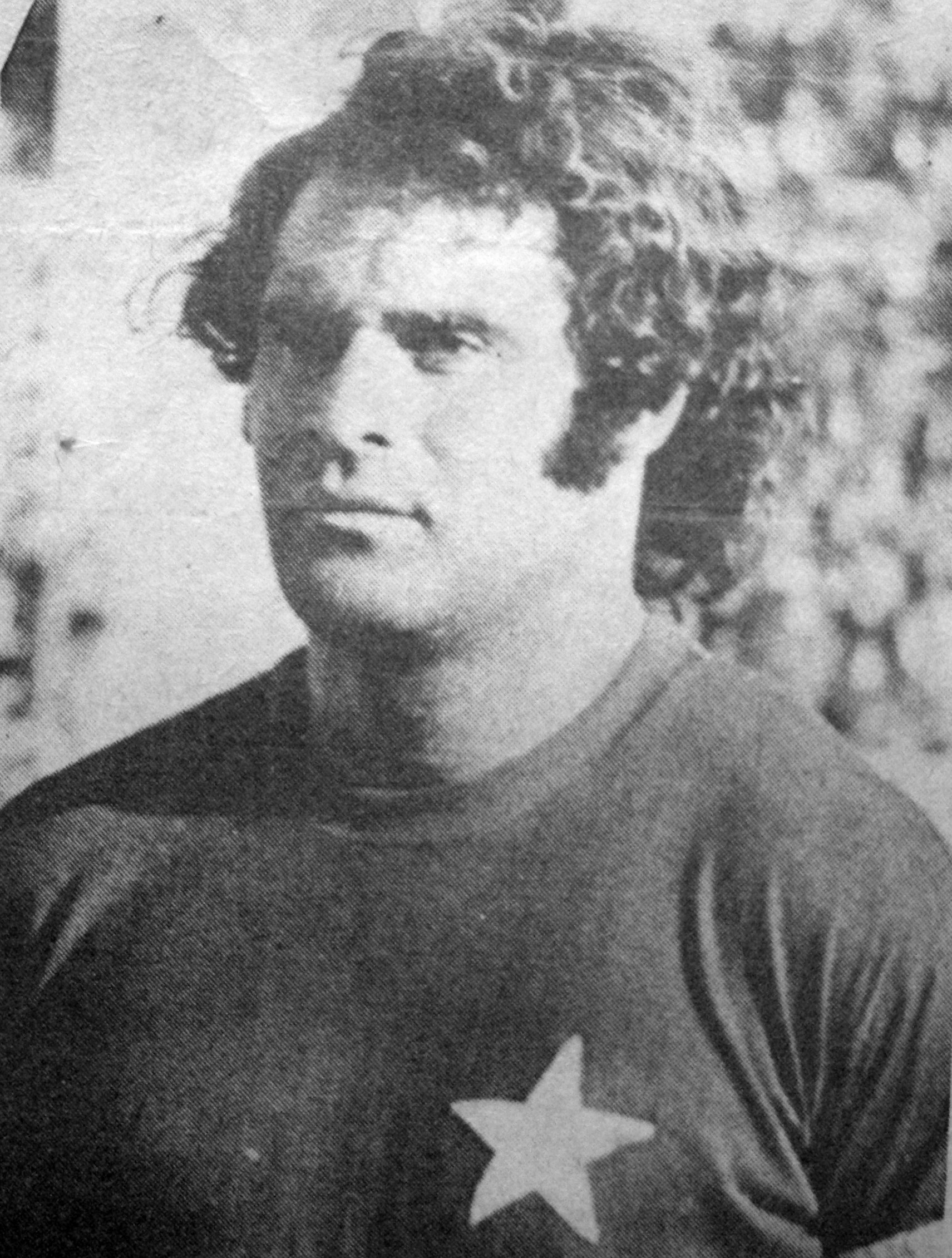
Mohsen Habacha, coach from 1980 to 1983 and won 2 Tunisian Cups.

In 1984 the team finished third in the championship and came out of the Cup in the 16th round against CS Hammam-Lif 2–1. The following year, the team finished fourth and also lost in the cup against CS Sfaxien 2–1 in the quarter-finals. Coach Amor Dhib, who despite his failure in the Tunisian Cup, was forced to leave in the 16th round against Espérance 2–0, but managed to restore the local league to the team's coffers after a 14-year absence. They won also the Tunisian Super Cup for the second time in their history by beating Espérance. In 1986, the young coach Faouzi Benzarti was appointed as head coach of the team. He won the local league for the second time in a row, in addition to the exit from the Tunisian Cup in the 16th round against CO Transports on penalties. The team also won the local Super Cup for the second time in front of the CA Bizertin. The team also participated in 1987 Arab Club Champions Cup, they passed the first round against JS Kabylie and Raja Casablanca before withdrawing in the second round defeat against the Iraqi Al-Rasheed and the Saudi Al-Ittihad. And in the late eighties and early nineties the level of the team fell to miss the podiums and the period was also accompanied by a significant change in the number of coaches and in the management of the team which did not know the stability after the arrival of more than one president during that period, they finished in fifth place in 1988 and came out of the Cup in the semi-finals against Club Africain on penalties and in 1989 the team finished third in the league and also lost in the semifinals again against Espérance 1–0. The team also participated in the 1989 Arab Club Champions Cup, which passed the first round which includes JS Kabylie and CLAS Casablanca and reached the semi-finals after the victory over Wydad Casablanca before the defeat against Al-Hilal of Saudi Arabia. In 1990 the team finished the season in fourth place and also suffered a spectacular defeat in the 16th round of the Tunisian Cup in front of the Océano Club de Kerkennah 3–0. In 1991, Faouzi Benzarti returned to coach the team and finished third, and reached the final of the cup before losing to Espérance 2–1 at El Menzah Stadium. In 1992, ESS finished the season in fifth place and came out of Tunisia Cup in the semi-final against Club Africain on penalties. The 1993 season was disastrous for the team as they came in the ninth-place, the worst position they have ever had since the Tunisian independence, and a humiliating defeat against AS Marsa 4–0 in the semi-finals of the Cup. The president of the team, Hammadi Mestiri left the team that season to succeed him the club's son Othman Jenayah in the presidency of the club.

=== Jenayah era: Continental brilliance (1993–2006) ===
After the appointment of Othman Jenayah as president of the team, Algerian coach Rabah Saâdane was hired to coach the team. He reached the final of the Cup in 1994 before being defeated against AS Marsa and ended the season in second place behind Espérance. The team also participated in the 1993 Arab Cup Winners' Cup and reached the semi-final before the defeat against CO Casablanca. In the following season, Brazilian coach José Dutra dos Santos was appointed as coach to be the first coach of South America to take the team to the third place in the domestic league before going out in the round of 16 of the cup against the Olympique Béja and returned to compete for regional competitions this year after obtaining the Maghreb Cups in the seventies as the team reached the final of the 1995 Arab Cup Winners' Cup before being defeated against fellow Club Africain at the Stade Olympique de Sousse. The team won the 1995 CAF Cup for the first time in their history to be their first continental trophy ever after their final win over AS Kaloum Star of Guinea 2–0. The administration decided to renew confidence in the Brazilian coach. The team won the Tunisian Cup 13 years later by beating JS Kairouan in the final 2–1 and the team finished second in the league. The team also reached the final of the CAF Cup in the same year before the final defeat to the Kawkab Marrakech by Away goals rule. In the 1997 season, the team won the league title after 10 years despite disappointing results in the cup after the quarter-final against JS Kairouan. The team also won the 1997 African Cup Winners' Cup the same year after overcoming teams such as Hearts of Oak of Ghana and the Al-Mokawloon before winning the final against FAR Rabat 2–1. The contract was terminated with the Brazilian coach and was contracted with Croatian Ivan Buljan, who won the CAF Super Cup for the first time in its history and also achieved the third place in the league and also was defeated in the quarter-finals of the Cup to AS Marsa 2–1. The management of the team appointed Jean Fernandez, the team settled in fourth place in the national championship and came out early in the cup against ES Zarzis on penalty shootout.

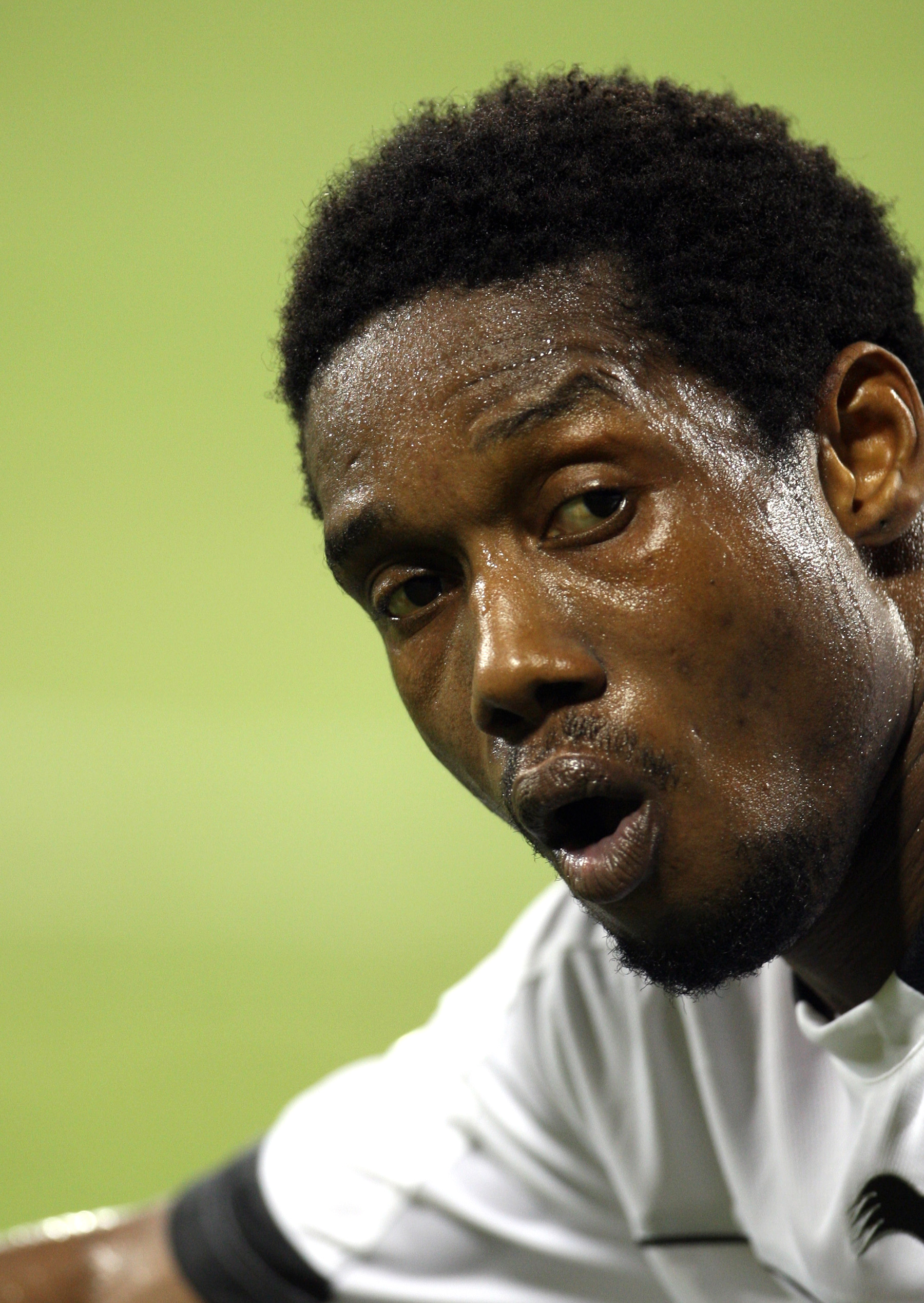
Kader Keita began his professional career in ESS before European brilliance.

The team then signed with coach Lotfi Benzarti to train the club. Lotfi won the CAF Cup in 1999 after overcoming clubs such as Zamalek in the semi-final and Wydad Casablanca in the final. ESS continued his performances in African competitions and the team reached the second place in 2000 in addition to withdrawing from the semi-finals against Club Africain. In the next season with the Serbian coach Ivica Todorov, the team won second place before being defeated in the Cup final against CS Hammam-Lif in the first match at the Stade 7 November in Radès which was opened for the 2001 Mediterranean Games. The team also reached the CAF Cup final in the same year before the defeat against JS Kabylie. In 2002, ESS won second place in the league for the third time in a row but did not play Tunisian Cup that year due to the overcrowding after Tunisia qualified for the 2002 FIFA World Cup.

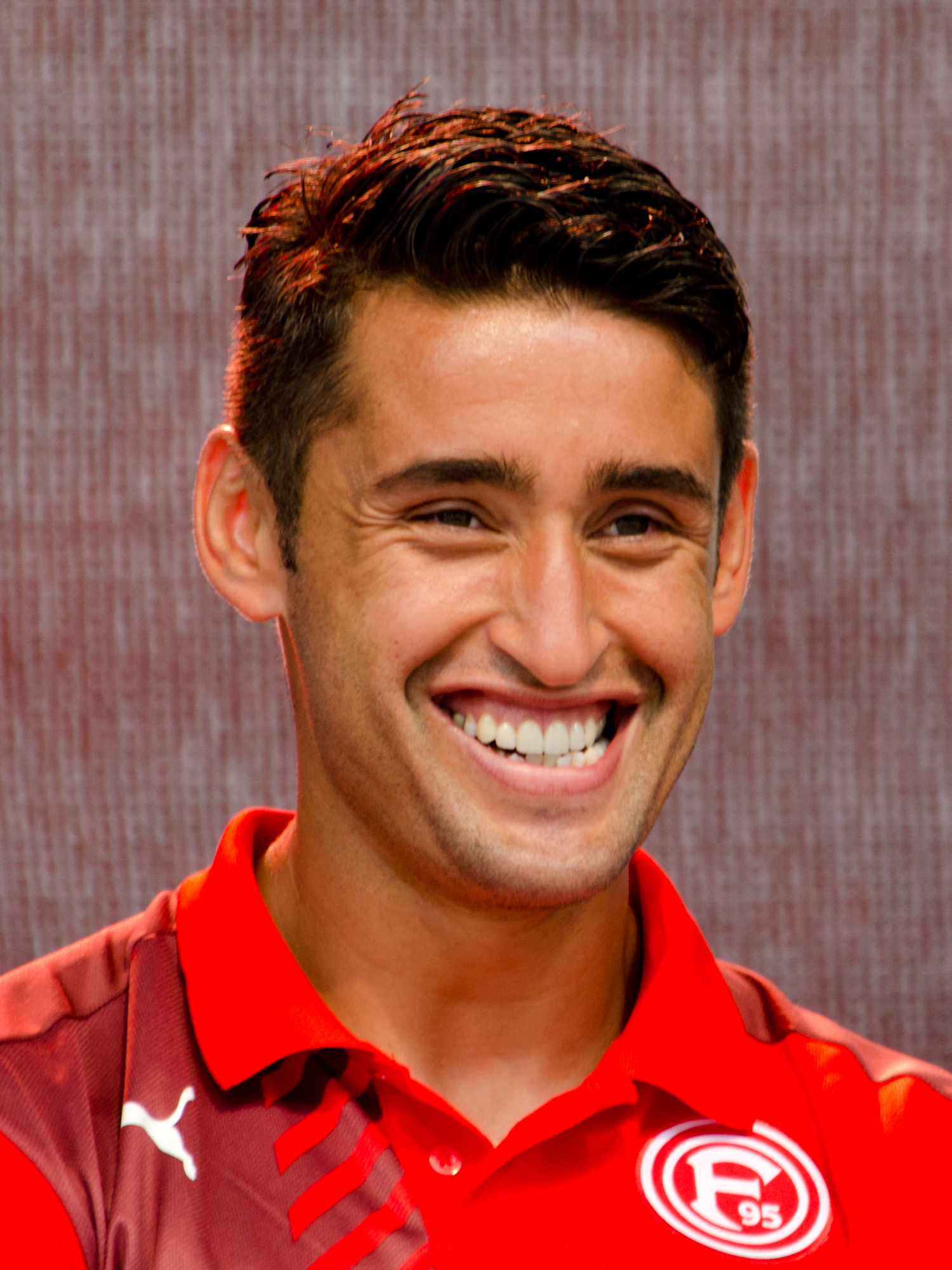
Karim Haggui, one of the most important players of the team in 2003.

In 2003, Frenchman René Lobello was named coach of the club and the team continued to win second place in the local tournament again, in addition to defeating Espérance in the quarter-final 1–0, but the team won the 2003 African Cup Winners' Cup after beating the Nigerian team Julius Berger 3–0 so that ES Sahel came the most Tunisian teams winning the African titles. The team continued to fight with the French school to appoint Bernard Simondi as coach of the club. The team took second place in the local championship to become the node of the team and they came out of the semi-finals of the cup against Espérance on penalties and also was defeated in the African Super Cup against Enyimba. The team played in the same season the 2003–04 Arab Champions League before coming out in the second round against Al Ahly SC and Ismaily SC of Egypt with difficulty.

At the end of the year, Abdelmajid Chetali took charge of the team after reaching the final of the African Champions League for the first time in their history before being defeated against Enyimba in the final on penalty shootout. In 2005, the team went out of the final round of the cup against Espérance on penalties and took second place in the tournament after equal points with CS Sfaxien before FIFA decided to settle for the latter. In July of the same year, the team signed a contract with the Bosnian coach Mehmed Baždarević who managed to reach the final of the 2005 CAF Champions League for the second time in their history and after the FAR Rabat exceeded the second round and Raja Casablanca in the semi-finals, but was defeated again in the final against Al-Ahly 3–0. In the local Cup, the team went out against CS Hammam-Lif 2–1. Baždarević was fired by Étoile on 12 April 2006, after a 1–0 home defeat to US Monastir in their final league game which cost them the Tunisian championship with just one point behind Espérance in the league. The team signed two days later with coach Faouzi Benzarti to lead the team next season.

=== African domination and rise to the international level (2006–2008) ===
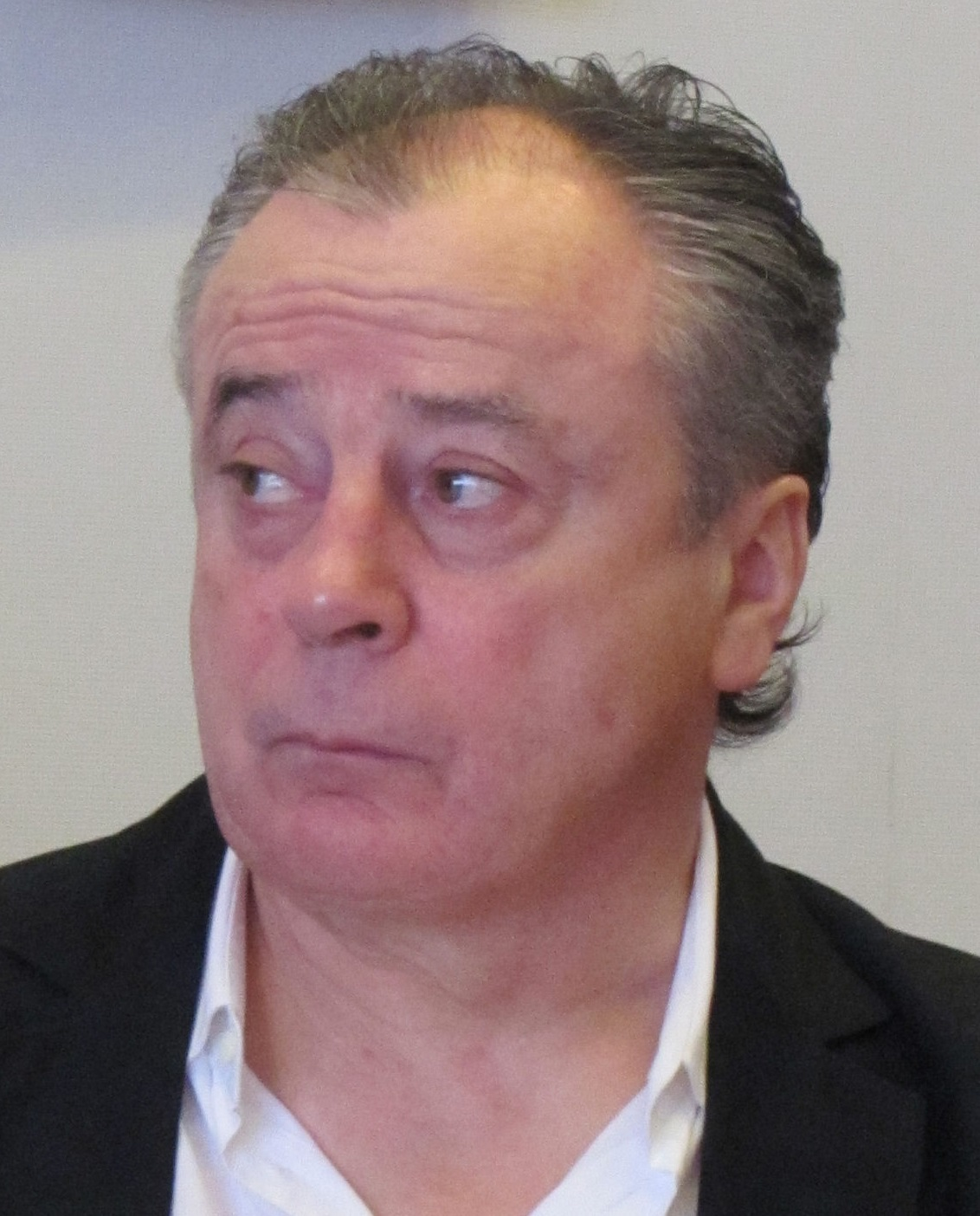
Bertrand Marchand guided his team to win the CAF Champions League.

Moez Driss became president on 8 June 2006 and Faouzi Benzarti was the team's coach. Benzarti was contracted with the team in order to resolve the second place node of the championship and continue to shine African and had what he wanted as the team was able to win the 2006 CAF Confederation Cup after beating his compatriot Espérance by winning at home and away and winning the Moroccan FAR Rabat in the final and is what enabled the club to play the African Super Cup against Al Ahly of Egypt but was defeated by penalties in Addis Ababa Stadium in Ethiopia. Benzarti won the league title finally after finishing second in seven consecutive years despite the early exit in the Cup against CS Hammam-Lif on penalties in the quarter-finals.

ESS starting line-up against Al Ahly at the 2007 CAF Champions League Final, a match they won 3–1.

In May 2007, Moez Driss announced the sudden dismissal of Faouzi Benzarti from the team's training before the start of the CAF Champions League. The Frenchman Bertrand Marchand, who was the coach of Club Africain in that period was appointed. He succeeded in the group stage of the African competition by surpassing JS Kabylie, the Al-Ittihad and the FAR Rabat before winning the semi-final of the Al-Hilal of Sudan to qualify for the final match for the third in only 4 years and was the final with Al-Ahly, who holds the record in the number of titles and also won ESS in the 2005 final and exceeded his compatriot CS Sfaxien in 2006 for the victory of Al-Ahly sixth title, especially after the end of the first leg in Sousse with a draw 0–0. On 9 November 2007, ES Sahel made a surprise by beating Al Ahly in Cairo 3–1.

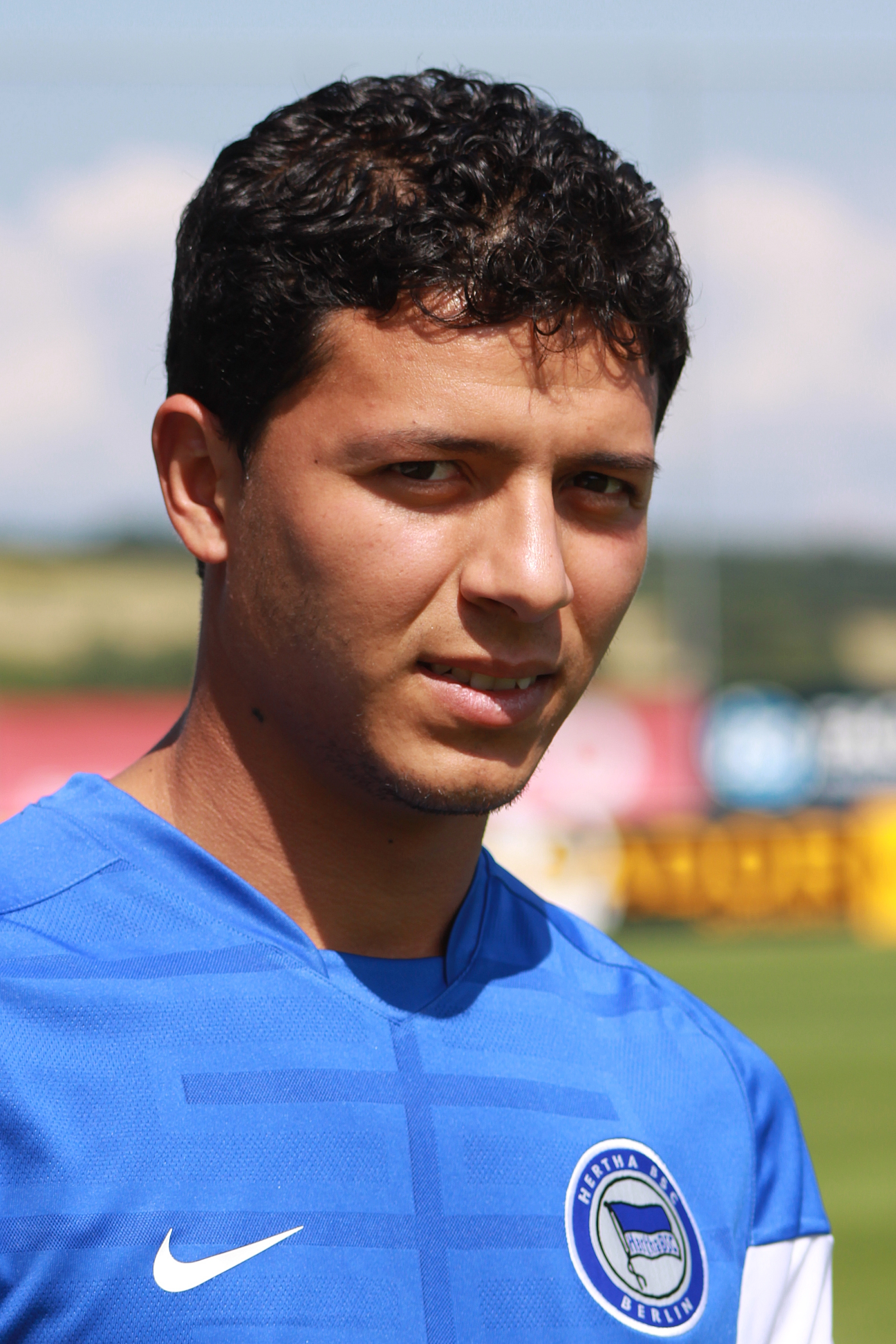
Amine Chermiti who scored the winning goal for his team in CAF Champions League.

The win enabled the team to qualify for the FIFA Club World Cup in Japan for the first time in their history to meet one of the best clubs in the world, like AC Milan as the European champions of 2007 and Boca Juniors also after winning the Copa Libertadores. In the quarter-finals, the team met Pachuca of Mexico, one of the best clubs in North America, especially after winning the CONCACAF Champions League title. But the Tunisian team managed to beat it with the goal of the Ghanaian player Moussa Narry in the 85th minute to be the second African team after Al-Ahly to qualify for the semi-finals. The team found itself against Boca Juniors in the semi-finals. Boca Juniors won 1–0 to prevent ES Sahel from meeting AC Milan in the final.

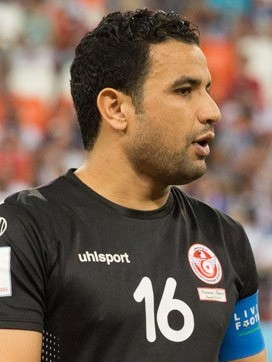
Aymen Mathlouthi one of the best goalkeepers in ESS who achieved almost all possible titles.

In the third-place match, ESS tied the host and the Asian champions Urawa Red Diamonds 2–2 after the goal of Chermiti for his team before the end of the game with a quarter of an hour, but the penalty shootout led to the victory of the Japanese team. ESS ended the World Cup in fourth place in his first appearance. After these performances, ES Sahel found itself as first in Tunisia and Africa in the IFFHS club ranking.

Locally, ES Sahel was just around the corner to maintain the league title, especially as it was the best club in Tunisia in that period before the title went to the Club Africain in the last round narrowed by just two points. Marchand announced his departure so the management appointed Swiss coach Michel Decastel to lead the team. The team reached the final of the Cup before losing to Espérance 2–1 in a game that was widely contested after the German referee Florian Meyer refused 3 correct goals for the team. In spite of the absence of the CAF Champions League this year, ES Sahel continued their performances surpassing Espérance in the first round 2–0, JS Kabylie, Al-Merrikh and Asante Kotoko in the group stage to find themselves in front of their compatriot CS Sfaxien in the final. However, the title went to CS Sfaxien after a draw in Sousse 2–2 to be followed by dismissal of the coach and begin a phase of instability.

=== Disappointments (2008–2013) ===
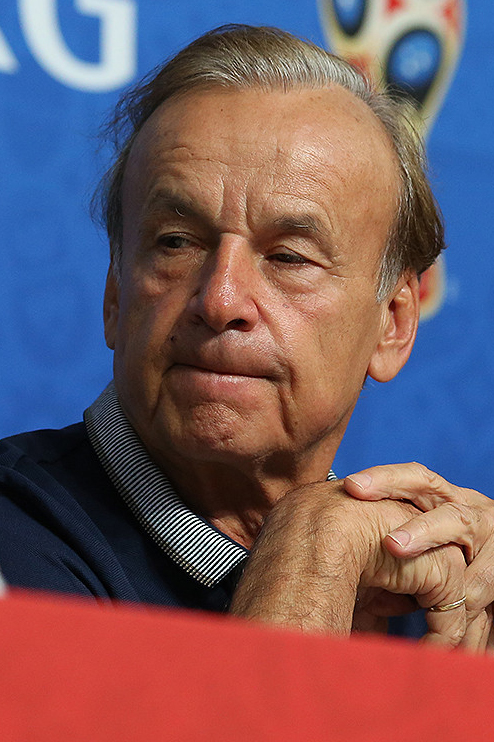
Gernot Rohr managed the team in 2009.

The team came in third place in the local league, which prevented ESS from participating in the African Champions League. The team came out also of the Cup of Tunisia in the quarter-finals after the defeat against Espérance 1–0 which contributed to the departure of Rohr from the team. The former coach of US Monastir Lotfi Rhim has been appointed as coach of the team in May 2009, which witnessed the group stage of the African Champions League after overcoming ASO Chlef and Al Ahly Tripoli in the first round.

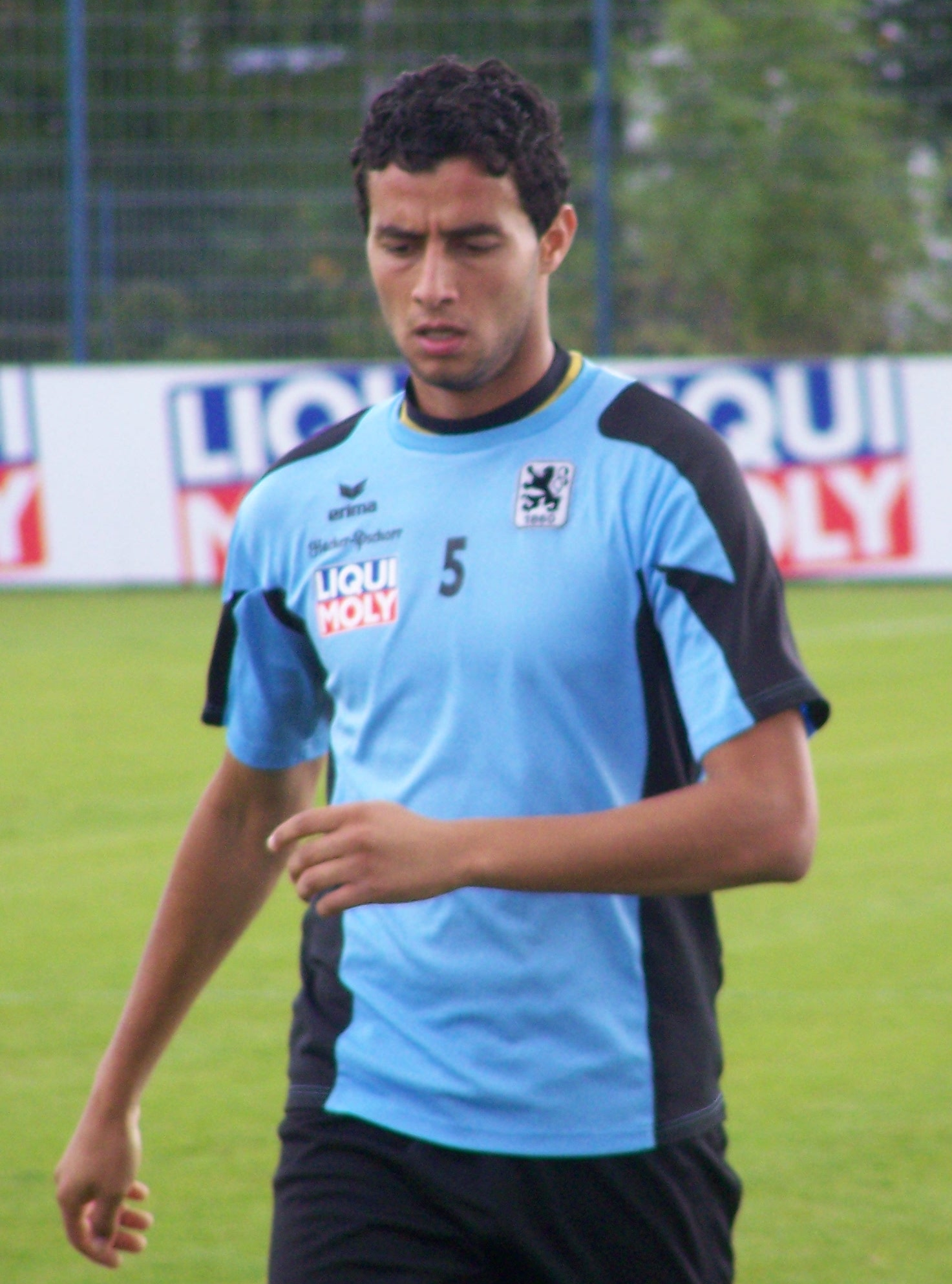
Radhouène Felhi did not leave the team in bad moments.

However, ESS failed to qualify for the semi-finals after being defeated against TP Mazembe and Heartland FC as they came out from the Tunisian Cup early after the defeat against the AS Marsa on penalties. The Dutch coach Piet Hamberg also failed to emerge the team from the crisis after the early withdrawal of the 2010 CAF Confederation Cup and the third place in the league. All these disappointments contributed to the resignation of the team management and the election of a new body headed by the former player Hamed Kammoun. Moroccan coach Mohamed Fakhir was hired to lead the team and despite the good start in the local championship, the training period did not exceed 4 months to be replaced by Mondher Kebaier who improved the results of the team and returned to compete for the league title after beating Espérance 5–1 in that period and the arrival in the Cup final. However, the team lost these titles to Espérance in the end. In the African competitions and after winning the first round against Ashanti Gold, the team refused to travel to Nigeria to meet Kaduna United for security reasons, which led to the exclusion of the team from the competition.

The resignation of Hamed Kammoun from the presidency of the team in May 2011 to the emergence of a major crisis in the team affected the performance of the team which knew 4 coaches in one season which was bad for the fans of ES Sahel after the fourth position in the league in 2012. The Cup of Tunisia was not terminated because of political events in Tunisia in 2011. The team's new management, headed by Hafedh Hmaied, was unable to end the crisis in the team. Ridha Charfeddine was appointed to this post in May 2012. ESS qualified for the group stage of the 2012 CAF Champions League. The riot at Stade Olympique de Sousse on August 18, 2012, led to make a decision by the CAF to exclude them from the tournament. This contributed to the aggravation of the team's crises.

=== Local and continental return (2013–2019) ===
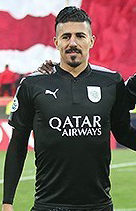
Baghdad Bounedjah.

In February 2013, former Cameroon coach Denis Lavagne was appointed to lead the team to qualify for the playoff phase of the local championship and competed for the last round before finishing in third place. In fact, ESS was champions in the first half of the last round. And despite the team exceeded JSM Béjaïa in the first round, the team failed to qualify for the semi-finals of the 2013 CAF Confederation Cup after losing to CS Sfaxien and Stade Malien. As for the 2012 Tunisian Cup, which was completed in 2013, ES Sahel won it after beating CS Sfaxien 1–0 to be the first trophy they have won in the last five years.

In December 2013, Frenchman Roger Lemerre was hired to lead the team. He won the 2014 Tunisian Cup for the second time in the final after beating CS Sfaxien in the final. The team signed with Serbian Dragan Cvetković, who did not stay in office more than a month after the catastrophic results of the 2014 CAF Confederation Cup by finishing last in the group to be replaced by coach Faouzi Benzarti.

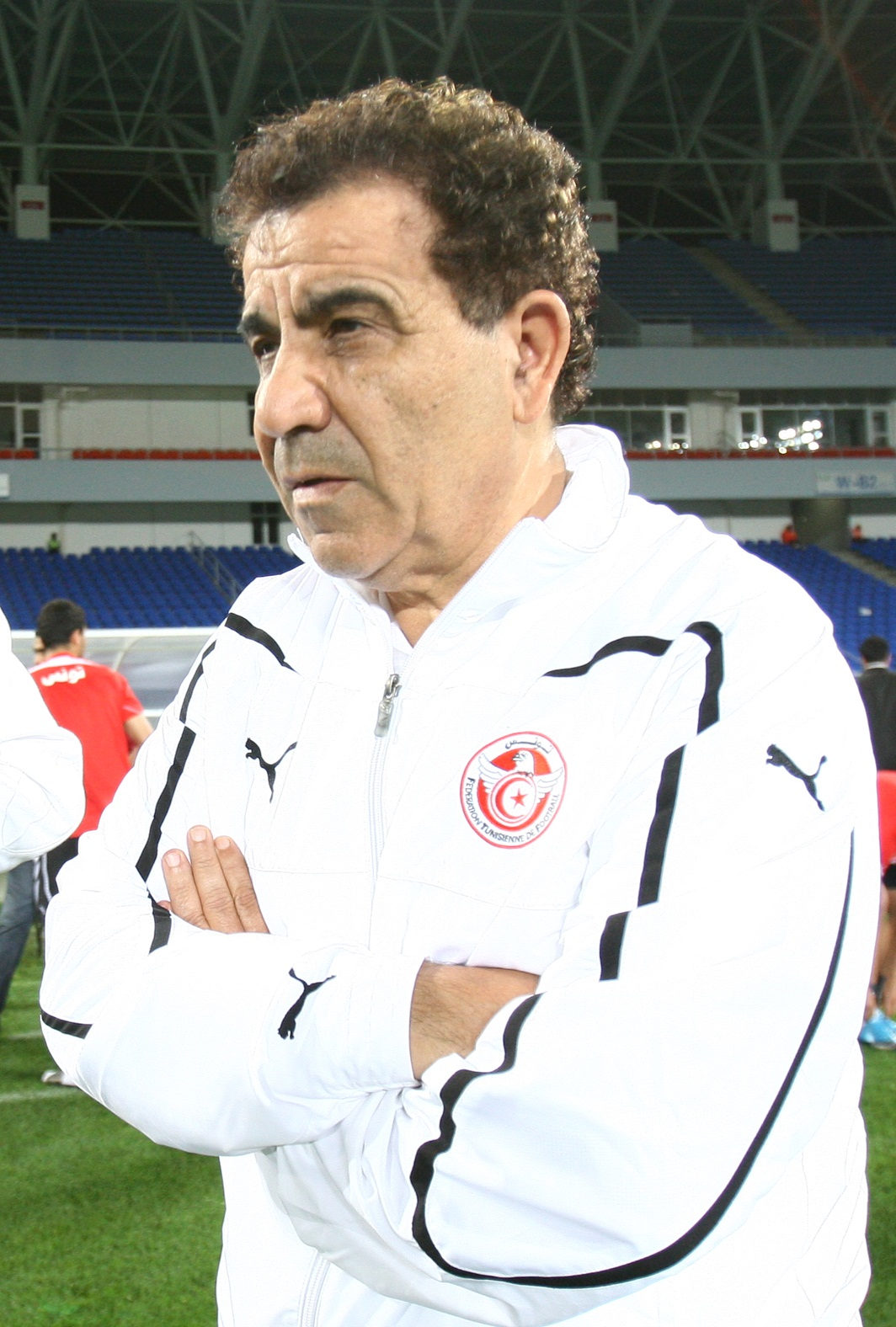
Faouzi Benzarti won with ESS 4 Tunisian leagues (1987, 2007, 2016 and 2023).

The team finished the season in second place of the local championship after an arbitration dispute led to the refusal of the team management to play the game of CS Hammam-Lif. However, the team won the local cup after beating Stade Gabèsien 4–3 in the final to win the trophy for the third time. As for the continent, the team played in the 2015 CAF Confederation Cup, surpassing Moroccan Raja Casablanca in the first round as they qualified for the semi-finals after passing Stade Malien and its compatriot Espérance and winning Al Ahly of Egypt and then beat Zamalek in the semi-finals in a match 5–1 for ESS before going beyond Orlando Pirates in the final to win the first African title since 2008 dedicated to his return to Africa and become the most capped CAF Cup team with 4 titles.

This African title win allowed ESS to play in the 2016 CAF Super Cup against TP Mazembe, but the team lost 2–1. Locally, the team won the league after nine years to collect 77 points. The team was eliminated from the quarterfinals of the Cup after a defeat against Espérance 1–0 and in the same year the team was unable to qualify for the group stage from the African Champions League after defeating Enyimba narrowly 4–3 to qualify for the 2016 CAF Confederation Cup, which was close to the maintenance of the title after the qualification the semi-final, surpassing in the Group FUS Rabat, Kawkab Marrakech and Al Ahly of Tripoli before coming out in front of TP Mazembe in the semi-finals. After nearly three years at the helm of the team, Faouzi Benzarti and the team management were separated for financial reasons to go to Espérance de Tunis.

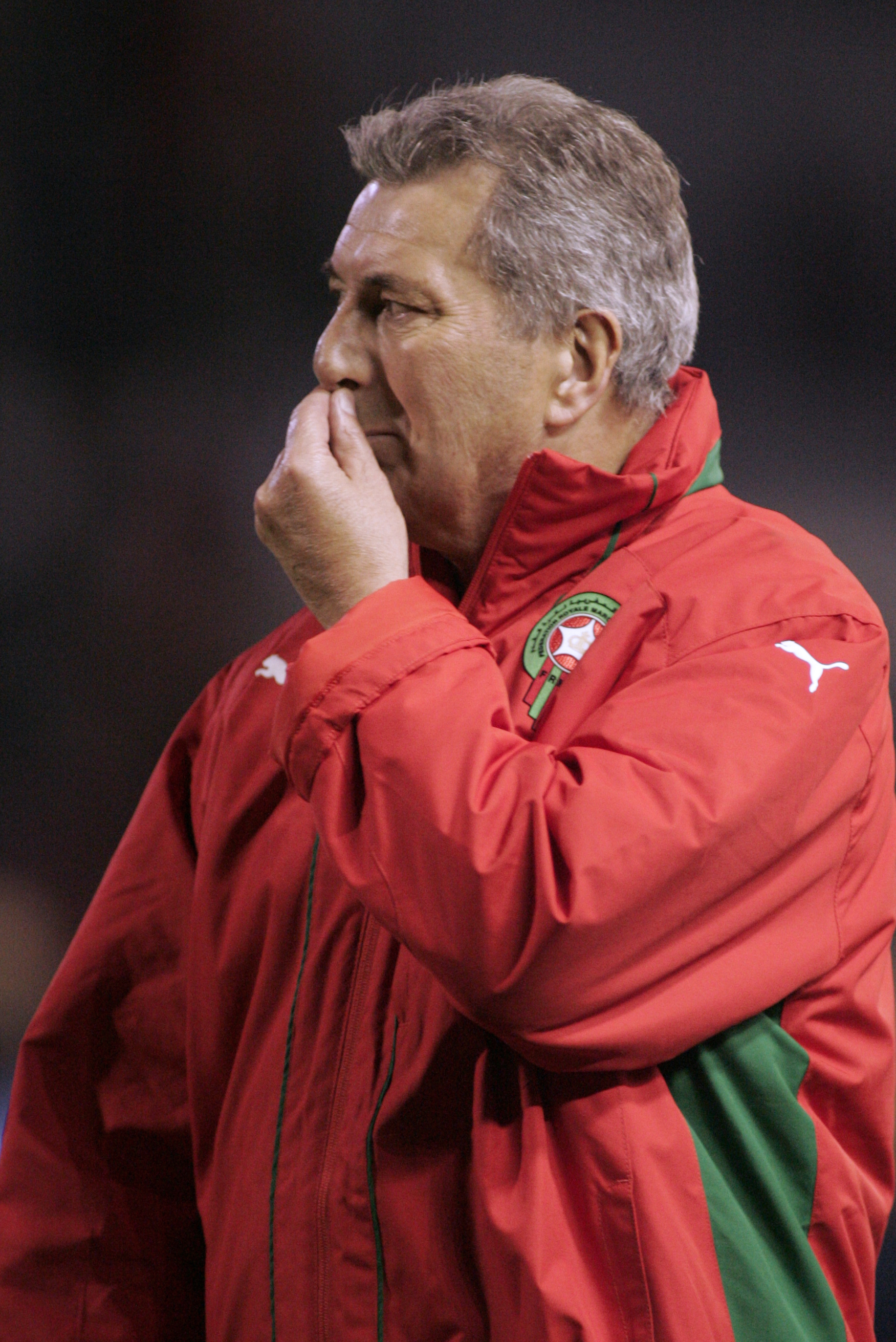
Roger Lemerre, one of the most successful coaches of ES Sahel.

The team's managing director appointed the former coach of TP Mazembe, Hubert Velud to coach the team, leaving the quarter-finals of the Cup against CS Hammam-Lif on penalties before coming in second place in the league after competing with Espérance in the last round. Continentally, The team managed to move beyond the group stage of the African Champions League, bypassing the two teams of Sudan: Al-Hilal and Al-Merrikh, and to beat Al Ahli Tripoli in the quarter-finals 2–0 to qualify for the semi-finals of the tournament for the first time in 10 years where they won the competition. But ESS lost to Al-Ahly 7–3 to get out of the competition and the dismissal of the French coach Velud. Most of the members of the administration, such as Ziad Jaziri and Hussein Jenayah, resigned.

With the arrival of Algerian coach Kheïreddine Madoui, the team reached the final of the Tunisian Cup before losing to the Club Africain 4–1 in addition to the end of the season in third place despite the equal points with Club Africain before the deduction is based on direct confrontations. After that, Chiheb Ellili was hired but he did not stay much after the Champions League exit to Espérance in the quarterfinals with difficulty. The Belgian coach Georges Leekens did not survive because of the unconfirmed results in the Tunisian league. Roger Lemerre was relegated by the management, improving the team's results to finish second in the league, just two points from the top, and managed to reach the final of Tunisia Cup. Outside of Tunisia, the team managed to qualify for the semi-finals of the 2019 CAF Confederation Cup after beating Al-Hilal of Sudan before they struggled out against Zamalek. In addition, the team succeeded in winning the Arab Club Champions Cup for the first time in its history after beating Al-Ramtha of Jordan in the first round, and the two Moroccan clubs of Casablanca: Wydad and Raja, then Al-Merrikh of Sudan in the semi-final before winning the final in Hazza bin Zayed Stadium at Al Ain in UAE, after beating Al-Hilal of Saudi Arabia 2–1 to win $6 million.

=== Decline and away from the stadium (2019–present) ===
The 2–0 victory over Club Africain in June 2019 was the last match held at the Stade Olympique de Sousse before its closure and the launch of its expansion, which coincided with the team's decline in results. During the renovation period, the team was obliged to play its home matches at the Bou Ali Lahouar Stadium in Hammam Sousse.

The stadium was reopened on 4 May 2022 during the second fixture of the playoff phase of the 2021–22 season, which ended in a 1–1 draw against CS Sfaxien.

== Rivalries ==
The Tunisian classico is a football match between Étoile Sportive du Sahel and the other major Tunisian clubs: Espérance Sportive de Tunis (EST), Club Africain (CA) and Club Sportif Sfaxien (CSS). This denomination is inspired by the Spanish El Clásico between Real Madrid and FC Barcelona.

In terms of location, ESS are quite an isolated club, so games against US Monastir (USM) are considered local derbies.

=== Étoile Sportive du Sahel – Espérance Sportive de Tunis ===
The two teams met for the first time in the league during the 1944–1945 criterium; their first match ended in a draw 0–0. They met regularly from 1946 to 1947, after the unification of the north and south Championships, except in 1961–1962 when the Etoile Sportive du Sahel was dissolved.

Before independence, the two teams met only 16 times, Espérance won 7 of them and Étoile in 5 matches while the teams tied on 4 occasions. Espérance scored 22 goals while Étoile scored 20 goals

In the national championship, which was founded after independence, the statistics are very close. Espérance won 46 games and Étoile in 38, while 42 games ended with a draw and Espérance scored 130 goals while ESS scored 117 goals.

In the Tunisian Cup, despite winning Espérance in 12 games and ESS won in 11 and tied in 3, but Étoile Sportive du Sahel scored 27 goals while Espérance scored 25 goals.

But in the African competitions, both in the CAF Champions League and the CAF Confederation Cup, the cusp tends in the caf confederation league to ESS who won 5 games while Espérance won 4 matches in the caf champions league and the teams tied in 3 of them.

==== Classico statistics ====
- As of 23 August 2026

Tournament	Games Played	EST Victory	Draw	ESS Victory
Before 1956	16	7	4	5
Ligue Professionnelle 1	141	58	45	38
Tunisian Cup	26	12	3	11
Tunisian Super Cup	1	0	1	0
Champions League	10	7	3	0
Confederation Cup	6	0	1	5
TOTAL	200	84	57	59

=== Étoile Sportive du Sahel – Club Africain ===
In the national championship, which was founded in 1956, Club Africain won 45 games and Étoile du Sahel in 42, while 38 games ended with a draw and Club Africain scored 129 goals while ESS scored 124 goals.

In the Tunisian Cup, despite winning Étoile Sportive du Sahel in 10 games and CA won in only 7 and tied in 3, but Club Africain scored 21 goals while ES Sahel scored 20 goals.

In the Tunisian Super Cup, there is just one match between the teams with a large victory for ESS which won 5–2.

Outside of Tunisia, the two teams met in one match in the Arab cup final, which ended in favour of CA in the extra time.

Competitions	Pld	ESS	CA	Draw
Tunisian League	132	45	45	42
Tunisian Cup	22	10	7	5
Tunisian Super Cup	1	1	0	0
Arab Cup Winners' Cup	1	0	1	0
Total	156	56	53	47

=== Étoile Sportive du Sahel – Club Sportif Sfaxien ===
The two teams met for the first time in the league in December 1955; their first match ended for CS Sfaxien 3–1. They met regularly from 1946 to 1947, the reunion season for the North and South Championships, except in except in 1961–1962 when the Etoile Sportive du Sahel was dissolved.

In the national championship, which was founded in 1956, Étoile du Sahel won 54 games and Club Sfaxien in 31, while 43 games ended with a draw and ESS scored 154 goals while CSS scored 116 goals.

In the Tunisian Cup, Étoile du Sahel won in 3 games and Club Sfaxien in 2, while 2 games ended with a draw.

But in the African competitions, both in the CAF Cup and the CAF Confederation Cup, the cusp tends to CSS who won 3 games while ÉSS won 1 match and the teams tied in 4 of them.

Competitions	Pld	ESS	CSS	Draw
Tunisian League	133	55	34	44
Tunisian Cup	7	3	2	2
CAF Confederation Cup	6	0	3	3
CAF Cup	2	1	0	1
Total	143	59	39	50

== Honours ==
Étoile Sportive du Sahel was the first African club to have won all official club competitions recognized by the Confederation of African Football.

Type	Competition	Titles	Winning Seasons
Domestic	Tunisian Ligue Professionnelle 1	11	1949–50, 1957–58, 1962–63, 1965–66, 1971–72, 1985–86, 1986–87, 1996–97, 2006–07, 2015–16, 2022–23
Domestic	Tunisian Cup	10	1958–59, 1962–63, 1973–74, 1974–75, 1980–81, 1982–83, 1995–96, 2011–12, 2013–14, 2014–15
Domestic	Tunisian League Cup	1	2004–05
Domestic	Tunisian Super Cup	3	1973, 1986, 1987
Continental	CAF Champions League	1	2007
Continental	CAF Confederation Cup	2	2006, 2015
Continental	African Cup Winners' Cup	2	1997, 2003
Continental	CAF Cup	2	1995, 1999
Continental	CAF Super Cup	2	1998, 2008
Regional	Arab Club Champions Cup	1	2018–19
Regional	Maghreb Champions Cup	1	1972
Regional	Maghreb Cup Winners' Cup	1	1975
International	FIFA Club World Cup	0	Fourth Place: 2007

== Statistics ==
=== African competitions ===
African Club Competitions
Year	CAF Champions League	African Cup Winners' Cup	CAF Cup	CAF Super Cup
1964–83	did not enter	did not enter	Started in 1992	Started in 1993
1984	did not enter	Round 1	Started in 1992	Started in 1993
1985	did not enter	did not enter	Started in 1992	Started in 1993
1986	did not enter	did not enter	Started in 1992	Started in 1993
1987	Round 2	did not enter	Started in 1992	Started in 1993
1988	Round 2	did not enter	Started in 1992	Started in 1993
1989	did not enter	did not enter	Started in 1992	Started in 1993
1990	did not enter	did not enter	Started in 1992	Started in 1993
1991	did not enter	did not enter	Started in 1992	Started in 1993
1992	did not enter	Round 1	did not enter	Started in 1993
1993	did not enter	did not enter	did not enter	did not enter
1994	did not enter	did not enter	did not enter	did not enter
1995	did not enter	did not enter	Winner	did not enter
1996	did not enter	did not enter	Runner-up	did not enter
1997	did not enter	Winner	did not enter	did not enter
1998	Group Stage	did not enter	did not enter	Winner
1999	did not enter	did not enter	Winner	did not enter
2000	did not enter	did not enter	Quarter-final	did not enter
2001	did not enter	did not enter	Runner-up	did not enter
2002	did not enter	did not enter	Quarter-final	did not enter
2003	did not enter	Winner	did not enter	did not enter
		CAF Confederation Cup		
2004	Runner-up	did not enter		Runner-up
2005	Runner-up	did not enter		did not enter
2006	Round 2	Winner		did not enter
2007	Winner	did not enter		Runner-up
2008	Round 2	Runner-up		Winner
2009	Group Stage	did not enter		did not enter
2010	did not enter	Round 1		did not enter
2011	did not enter	Round 2		did not enter
2012	Disqualified	did not enter		did not enter
2013	did not enter	Group Stage		did not enter
2014	did not enter	Group Stage		did not enter
2015	did not enter	Winner		did not enter
2016	Round 2	Semi-final		Runner-up
2017	Semi-final	did not enter		did not enter
2018	Quarter-Final	did not enter		did not enter
2019	did not enter	Semi-final		did not enter
2020	Quarter-Final	did not enter		did not enter
2021	did not enter	Group Stage		did not enter
2022	Group Stage	did not enter		did not enter
2023	did not enter	did not enter		did not enter
2024	Group Stage	did not enter		did not enter

Records

Competition	NS	GP	GW	GD	GL	GF	GA	DF	Points	Titels	Runners-up
CAF Champions League	16	134	66	30	38	184	119	+65	228	1	2
FIFA Club World Cup	1	3	1	1	1	3	3	0	4	–	–
CAF Cup Winners' Cup	4	22	11	5	6	36	20	+16	38	2	–
CAF Super Cup	5	5	1	2	2	5	6	-1	5	2	3
CAF Cup	6	48	29	3	16	93	47	+46	90	2	2
CAF Confederation Cup	10	96	48	28	20	136	74	+62	172	2	1
Total	42	308	156	69	83	457	269	+188	537	9	8
As of CAF Champions League 23-2024.

=== National competitions ===
Tunisian Clubs Competitions
Year	Tunisian League	Tunisian Cup	Super Cup
1925–26	did not enter	did not enter	Started in 1960
1926–27	did not enter	did not enter	Started in 1960
1927–28	did not enter	Not held	Started in 1960
1928–29	did not enter	Not held	Started in 1960
1929–30	did not enter	Round of 32	Started in 1960
1930–31	did not enter	Round 1	Started in 1960
1931–32	did not enter	Round of 16	Started in 1960
1932–33	did not enter	Round of 16	Started in 1960
1933–34	did not enter	Round 1	Started in 1960
1934–35	did not enter	Round of 16	Started in 1960
1935–36	did not enter	did not enter	Started in 1960
1936–37	did not enter	Semi-final	Started in 1960
1937–38	did not enter	Round of 16	Started in 1960
1938–39	did not enter	Runner-up	Started in 1960
1939–40	did not enter	Not held	Started in 1960
1940–41	did not enter	Not held	Started in 1960
1941–42	did not enter	Semi-final	Started in 1960
1942–43	did not enter	Not held	Started in 1960
1943–44	did not enter	Not held	Started in 1960
1944–45	did not enter	Round of 16	Started in 1960
1945–46	did not enter	Runner-up	Started in 1960
1946–47	Fourth Place	Round of 16	Started in 1960
1947–48	Fourth Place	Semi-final	Started in 1960
1948–49	Runner-up	Quarter-final	Started in 1960
1949–50	Winner	Runner-up	Started in 1960
1950–51	6th Place	Quarter-final	Started in 1960
1951–52	Fifth Place	Not held	Started in 1960
1952–53	Not held	Not held	Started in 1960
1953–54	Fifth Place	Runner-up	Started in 1960
1954–55	Fourth Place	Semi-final	Started in 1960
1955–56	Runner-up	Quarter-final	Started in 1960
1956–57	Third Place	Runner-up	Started in 1960
1957–58	Winner	Runner-up	Started in 1960
1958–59	Runner-up	Winner	Started in 1960
1959–60	7th Place	Runner-up	did not enter
1960–61	Dissolved	Quarter-final	Dissolved
1961–62	Dissolved	Dissolved	Dissolved
1962–63	Winner	Winner	Not held
1963–64	6th Place	Quarter-final	Not held
1964–65	Third Place	Round of 32	Not held
1965–66	Winner	Quarter-final	Runner-up
1966–67	Runner-up	Runner-up	Not held
1967–68	Fourth Place	Round of 32	did not enter
1968–69	Fifth Place	Round of 32	Not held
1969–70	Third Place	Round of 32	did not enter
1970–71	Fourth Place	Semi-final	Not held
1971–72	Winner	Quarter-final	Winner
1972–73	Runner-up	Quarter-final	Winner
1973–74	Third Place	Winner	Not held
1974–75	Third Place	Winner	Not held
1975–76	Runner-up	Semi-final	Not held
1976–77	Fifth Place	Round of 16	Not held
1977–78	Third Place	not held	Not held
1978–79	Third Place	Round of 32	did not enter
1979–80	Third Place	Round of 32	Not held
1980–81	Fourth Place	Winner	Not held
1981–82	Third Place	Quarter-final	Not held
1982–83	6th Place	Winner	Not held
1983–84	Third Place	Round of 32	did not enter
1984–85	Fourth Place	Quarter-final	did not enter
1985–86	Winner	Round of 32	Winner
1986–87	Winner	Round of 32	Winner
1987–88	Fifth Place	Semi-final	Not held
1988–89	Third Place	Semi-final	Not held
1989–90	Fourth Place	Round of 32	Not held
1990–91	Third Place	Runner-up	Not held
1991–92	Fifth place	Semi-final	Not held
1992–93	9th Place	Semi-final	Not held
1993–94	Runner-up	Runner-up	did not enter
1994–95	Third Place	Round of 16	did not enter
1995–96	Runner-up	Winner	Not held
1996–97	Winner	Quarter-final	Not held
1997–98	Third Place	Quarter-final	Not held
1998–99	Fourth Place	Round of 16	Not held
1999–2000	Runner-up	Semi-final	Not held
2000–01	Runner-up	Runner-up	did not enter
2001–02	Runner-up	Round of 16	Not held
2002–03	Runner-up	Quarter-final	Not held
2003–04	Runner-up	Semi-final	Not held
2004–05	Runner-up	Round of 16	Not held
2005–06	Runner-up	Round of 16	Not held
2006–07	Winner	Quarter-final	Not held
2007–08	Runner-up	Runner-up	Not held
2008–09	Third Place	Quarter-final	Not held
2009-10	Third Place	Round of 32	Not held
2010-11	Runner-up	Runner-up	Not held
2011-12	Fourth Place	Winner	Not held
2012-13	Third Place	did not enter	Not held
2013-14	Third Place	Winner	Not held
2014-15	Runner-up	Winner	Not held
2015-16	Winner	Quarter-final	Not held
2016-17	Runner-up	Quarter-final	Not held
2017-18	Third Place	Runner-up	Not held
2018–19	Runner-up	Runner-up	Withdrew
2019–20	Fourth Place	Round of 16	did not enter
2020–21	Runner-up	Round of 16	did not enter
2021–22	Fifth Place	Round of 32	did not enter
2022–23	Winner	Round of 16	Runner-up

== Individual honours ==
=== Top Scorers ===
Name	Season	Goals
(Tunisia) Habib Mougou	1955–56	25 goals
(Tunisia) Habib Mougou	1957–58	28 goals
(Tunisia) Othman Jenayah	1969–70	15 goals
(Tunisia) Abdesselam Adhouma	1970–71	17 goals
(Tunisia) Abdesselam Adhouma	1973–74	16 goals
(Tunisia) Raouf Ben Aziza	1975–76	20 goals
(Tunisia) Raouf Ben Aziza	1977–78	22 goals
(Brazil) / (Tunisia) Francileudo Santos	1998–99	14 goals
(Tunisia) Ahmed Akaichi	2010–11	14 goals
(Algeria) Baghdad Bounedjah	2013–14	14 goals
(Tunisia) Aymen Sfaxi	2020–21	09 goals
(Tunisia) Firas Chaouat	2024-25	17 goals

=== Tunisian Golden Boot ===
Year	Name
1970	(Tunisia) Othman Jenayah
1978	(Tunisia) Raouf Ben Aziza
1986	(Tunisia) Kamel Azzabi
1995	(Tunisia) Zoubeir Baya
1996	(Tunisia) Zoubeir Baya
2006	(Tunisia) Yassine Chikhaoui
2007	(Tunisia) Amine Chermiti
2016	(Tunisia) Hamza Lahmar
2019	(Tunisia) Wajdi Kechrida

=== African Competitions Golden Boot ===
Year	Name
2007	(Tunisia) Amine Chermiti

=== Arab Golden Boot ===
Year	Name
1999	(Tunisia) Kaies Ghodhbane

== IFFHS rankings ==
=== Club world ranking ===
Footballdatabase club's points 2 August 2020.

Pos.	Team	Points
186	(Colombia) Atlético Nacional	1549
187	(France) Monaco	1547
188	(Tunisia) Étoile du Sahel	1546
189	(Bulgaria) Levski Sofia	1545
190	(Argentina) Newell's Old Boys	1545

=== CAF club rankings ===
Footballdatabase club's points 2 August 2020.

Pos.	Team	Points
3	(Democratic Republic of the Congo) TP Mazembe	1591
4	(Sudan) Al Merrikh	1551
5	(Tunisia) Étoile du Sahel	1546
6	(Sudan) Al Hilal	1545
7	(Egypt) Zamalek	1542

=== National club rankings ===
Footballdatabase club's points 2 August 2020.

Pos.	Team	Points
1	(Tunisia) Espérance de Tunis	1640
2	(Tunisia) Étoile du Sahel	1546
3	(Tunisia) CS Sfaxien	1522
4	(Tunisia) Club Africain	1465
5	(Tunisia) US Monastir	1395

== CAF rankings ==
CAF Overall Ranking
Rank	Club	Points
1	(Egypt) Al Ahly	87
2	(Tunisia) Étoile du Sahel	60
3	(Tunisia) Espérance de Tunis	61
4	(Morocco) Wydad Casablanca	60
5	(South Africa) Mamelodi Sundowns	54
6	(Egypt) Zamalek	48
7	(Morocco) RS Berkane	42
8	(Tanzania) Simba	39
9	(Angola) Petro de Luanda	39
10	(Democratic Republic of the Congo) TP Mazembe	38

Ranking for 2019–20 CAF competitions
Rank	Club	2015	2016	2017	2018	2018–19	Total
1	(Tunisia) Espérance de Tunis	0.5	0	3	6	6	63.5
2	(Democratic Republic of the Congo) TP Mazembe	6	5	5	3	4	63
3	(Morocco) Wydad Casablanca	0	4	6	3	5	63
4	(Egypt) Al-Ahly	3	2	5	5	3	57
5	(Tunisia) Étoile du Sahel	5	3	4	3	3	50
6	(South Africa) Mamelodi Sundowns	0	6	3	2	4	49
7	(Egypt) Zamalek	3	5	2	0	5	44
8	(Guinea) Horoya	0	0	1	3	3	30
9	(Morocco) RS Berkane	0	0	0	2	4	28
10	(Algeria) USM Alger	5	0	4	2	0	25

== Management ==
Position	Name
President	(Tunisia) Foued Kacem
Vice-President in charge of indoor sports	(Tunisia) Ahmed Gafsi
General Secretary	(Tunisia) Mohamed Aissa Lanouar
Deputy General Secretary	(Tunisia) Kais Haj Khelifa
Treasurer	(Tunisia) Alya Maktouf
Legal Affairs Manager	(Tunisia) Yousra Safi
Manager for Relations with Sports Bodies	(Tunisia) Lotfi Slimane
Marketing Manager for the Centenary	(Tunisia) Adel Gannoun
Marketing Manager	(Tunisia) Walid Bousnina
Communications Manager	(Tunisia) Hatem Reguig
Senior Football Section Manager	(Tunisia) Montassar Ammar
Basketball Section Manager	(Tunisia) Sami Chermiti
Handball Section Manager	(Tunisia) Haroun Ben Hassine
Volleyball Section Manager	(Tunisia) Slim Jaidane

== Coaching staff ==
Position	Name
Head coach	(Tunisia) Mohamed Ali Nafkha
Assistant coach	(Tunisia) Iskander Guerdebbou
Assistant coach	(Tunisia) Wael Belaid
Goalkeeping coach	(Tunisia) Hamdi Beyoud
Physical coach	(Tunisia) Haythem Ben Othmane
Physical coach	(Tunisia) Khalil Zouaghi
Fitness coach	(Tunisia) Zaid Chelly
Fitness coach	(Tunisia) Bayrem Ben Mansour
Fitness coach	(Tunisia) Raouf Mathlouthi
Head of Statistics and Analysis	(Tunisia) Mohamed Ali Bakouch
Team doctor	(Tunisia) Faycel Khachnaoui

=== Current squad ===
As of 15 September 2026

Note: Flags indicate national team as defined under FIFA eligibility rules; some limited exceptions apply. Players may hold more than one non-FIFA nationality.

No.	Pos.	Nation	Player
1	GK	TUN	Khaled Youssef
2	DF	TUN	Wajdi Kechrida
3	DF	TUN	Anas Grira
5	DF	FRA	Philippe Lanquetin
6	MF	NGR	Ambrose Ochigbo
7	FW	TUN	Achref Ben Dhiaf
8	MF	TUN	Oussama Abid
9	FW	TUN	Mohamed Yassine Chaabani
10	MF	TUN	Abdallah Amri
11	FW	TUN	Ayoub Fajari
13	MF	TUN	Ahmed Zorgati
14	DF	TUN	Najeh Ferjani
15	MF	SEN	Ousmane Diakhaté
16	GK	TUN	Sabri Ben Hessen
17	FW	TUN	Nizar Smichi

No.	Pos.	Nation	Player
18	FW	TUN	Yassine Rjab
19	MF	TUN	Mohamed Bouslama
20	MF	FRA	Raïd Najjar
23	MF	TUN	Adem Ouertani
24	FW	NGR	Sunday Megwo
25	DF	SEN	Babacar Diarra
26	DF	TUN	Mohamed Hassine
27	DF	TUN	Azmi Ghouma
29	FW	SEN	Moussa Senghor
30	FW	TUN	Mohamed Anan
31	FW	MLI	Oumar Bah
33	DF	TUN	Houssem Dagdoug
34	MF	TUN	Rayan Gara
36	GK	TUN	Raed Gazzeh

== Managers ==
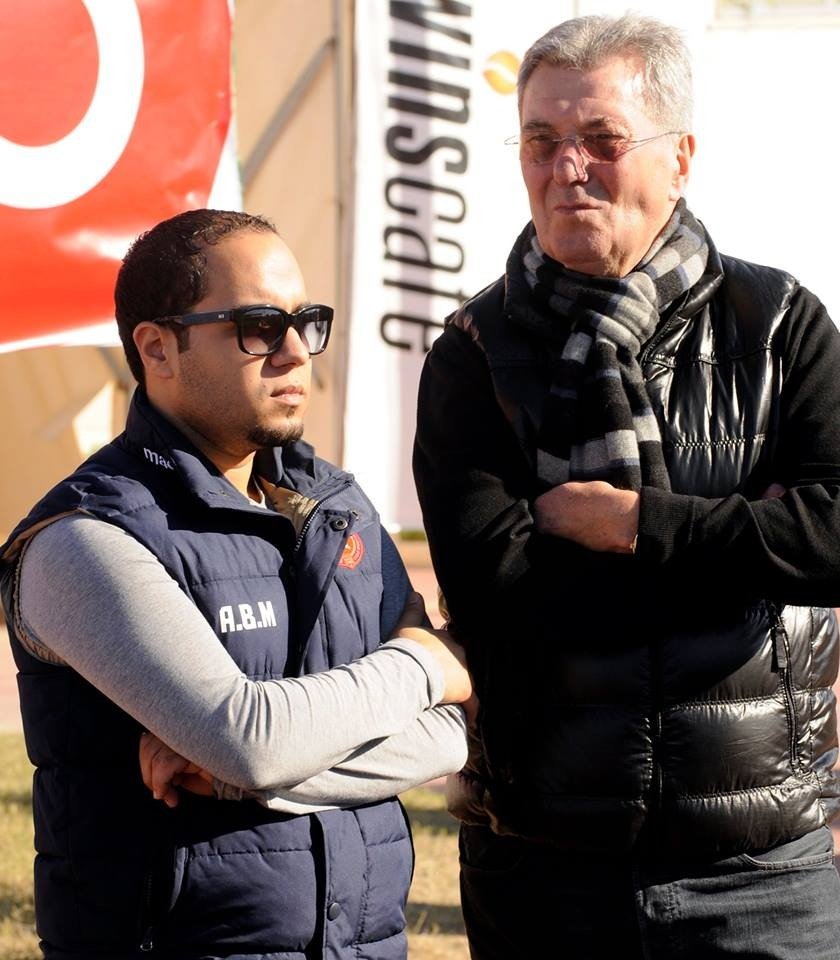
Roger Lemerre while coaching the team at Stade Olympique de Sousse.

Nat	Name	From	To	Honours
(Tunisia)	Ali Dardour	1925	1929	
(Tunisia)	Abdelhamid Beddaï	1929	1934	
(Tunisia)	Mohamed Boudhina	1934	1954	1949–1950 Tunisian League
(Tunisia)	Rachid Sehili	1953	1954	
(France)	Roger Chrétin	1954	1955	
(France)	Boumedienne Abderrhamane	1955	1956	
(England)	Georges Berry	1956	1958	1957–1958 Tunisian League
(Tunisia)	Habib Mougou	1958	1959	1958–1959 Tunisian Cup
(Algeria)	Said Ibrahimi	1959	1960	
(Socialist Federal Republic of Yugoslavia)	Božidar Drenovac	1960	1965	1962–1963 Tunisian Cup; 1962–1963 Tunisian League
(Soviet Union)	Aleksei Paramonov	1965	1967	1965–1966 Tunisian Lague
(Hungary)	Bella Harzeg	1967	1968	
(Hungary)	Turay	1968	1968	
(Tunisia)	Bechir Jerbi	1968	1969	
(Tunisia)	Habib Mougou	1969	1969	
(Socialist Federal Republic of Yugoslavia)	Božidar Drenovac	1969	1970	
(Tunisia)	Abdelmajid Chetali	1970	1975	1971–1972 Tunisian League; 1973 Maghreb Champions Cup; 1973 Tunisian Super Cup; 1973–1974 Tunisian Cup; 1974–1975 Tunisian Cup; 1975 Maghreb Cup Winners Cup
(Tunisia)	Raouf Ben Aziza	1975	1976	
(Soviet Union)	Aleksei Paramonov	1976	1978	
(Tunisia)	Ammar Ben Ahmed	1978	1980	
(Tunisia)	Mohsen Habacha	1980	1983	1980–1981 Tunisian Cup; 1982–1983 Tunisian Cup
(Socialist Federal Republic of Yugoslavia)	Dragan Vasiljević	1983	1984	
(Tunisia)	Ammar Ben Ahmed	1984	1985	
(Tunisia)	Amor Dhib	1985	1986	1985–1986 Tunisian League; 1986 Tunisian Super Cup
(Tunisia)	Faouzi Benzarti	1986	1988	1986–1987 Tunisian League; 1987 Tunisian Super Cup
(Soviet Union)	Nicolaï Koudiev	1988	1989	
(Bulgaria)	Asparuh Nikodimov	1989	1990	
(Tunisia)	Raouf Ben Amor	1990	1990	
(Tunisia)	Ahmed Ajlani	1990	1991	
(Tunisia)	Faouzi Benzarti	1991	1992	
(Russia)	Ivan Chteline	1992	1993	
(Algeria)	Rabah Saadane	1993	1994	
(Brazil)	José Dutra dos Santos	1994	1997	1995 CAF Cup; 1995–1996 Tunisian Cup; 1996 CAF Cup; 1996–1997 Tunisian League; 1997 African Cup Winners' Cup
(Croatia)	Ivan Buljan	1997	1998	1998 CAF Super Cup
(France)	Jean Fernandez	1998	1999	
(Tunisia)	Lotfi Benzarti	1999	2000	1999 CAF Cup
(Algeria)	Mahieddine Khalef	2000	2000	
(Serbia)	Ivica Todorov	2000	2001	
(France) (Tunisia)	Bernard Casoni; Chedly Mlik	1 July 2001	30 June 2002	2001 CAF Cup
(Brazil)	Paulo Rubim	2002	2002	
(Tunisia)	Ammar Souayah	2002	2003	
(France)	René Lobello	1 July 2003	30 December 2003	2003 African Cup Winners' Cup
(France)	Bernard Simondi	23 January 2004	30 June 2004	2004 CAF Super Cup
(Tunisia)	Mrad Mahjoub	2004	2004	
(Tunisia)	Abdelmajid Chetali	2004	2005	2004 CAF Champions League
(Bosnia and Herzegovina)	Mehmed Baždarević	1 July 2005	12 April 2006	2005 CAF Champions League
(Tunisia)	Faouzi Benzarti	14 April 2006	30 May 2007	2006 CAF Confederation Cup; 2007 CAF Super Cup; 2006–07 Tunisian League
(France)	Bertrand Marchand	1 June 2007	30 June 2008	2007 CAF Champions League; 2007 FIFA Club World Cup Fourth place 2008 CAF Super Cup
(Switzerland)	Michel Decastel	May 2008	November 2008	2008 CAF Confederation Cup
(Germany)	Gernot Rohr	27 November 2008	15 May 2009	
(Tunisia)	Lotfi Rhim	27 May 2009	16 December 2009	
(Netherlands)	Piet Hamberg	22 December 2009	15 April 2010	
(Morocco)	Mohamed Fakhir	1 July 2010	4 October 2010	
(Tunisia)	Mondher Kebaier	4 October 2010	3 October 2011	
(Tunisia)	Khaled Ben Sassi	3 October 2011	12 February 2012	
(Austria)	Bernd Krauss	12 February 2012	26 March 2012	
(Tunisia)	Faouzi Benzarti	27 March 2012	10 June 2012	
(Tunisia)	Mondher Kebaier	12 June 2012	27 February 2013	
(France)	Denis Lavagne	28 February 2013	8 December 2013	‡ 2011–12 Tunisian Cup
(France)	Roger Lemerre	8 December 2013	30 June 2014	2013–14 Tunisian Cup
(Serbia)	Dragan Cvetković	10 July 2014	11 August 2014	
(Tunisia)	Faouzi Benzarti	12 August 2014	27 December 2016	2014–15 Tunisian Cup; 2015 CAF Confederation Cup; 2016 CAF Super Cup; 2015–16 Tunisian League
(France)	Hubert Velud	27 December 2016	18 November 2017	
(Algeria)	Kheïreddine Madoui	18 December 2017	24 May 2018	
(Tunisia)	Chiheb Ellili	4 June 2018	9 October 2018	
(Belgium)	Georges Leekens	10 October 2018	26 November 2018	
(France)	Roger Lemerre	17 December 2018	2 July 2019	2018–19 Arab Champions Cup
(Tunisia)	Faouzi Benzarti	5 July 2019	25 September 2019	
(Spain)	Juan Carlos Garrido	18 November 2019	8 February 2020	
(Tunisia)	Kais Zouaghi	18 February 2020	16 March 2020	
(Brazil)	Jorvan Vieira	29 November 2020	11 January 2021	
(Tunisia)	Lassaad Dridi	14 January 2021	4 November 2021	
(France)	Roger Lemerre	15 November 2021	6 March 2022	
(Tunisia)	Lassaad Chabbi	8 March 2022	9 May 2022	
(Tunisia)	Mohamed Mkacher	8 August 2022	21 February 2023	
(Tunisia)	Faouzi Benzarti	28 February 2023	25 July 2023	2022–23 Tunisian League
(Tunisia)	Imed Ben Younes	25 July 2023	7 January 2024	
(Tunisia)	Ahmed Ajlani	1 February 2024		

Notes:

- ‡ Suspended in 2012 and resumed in 2013.

== Presidents ==
Since its creation, Hamed Karoui remains the one who was the longest president of the club (twenty years from 1961 to 1981). In July 2007, the former player of the club, Othman Jenayah, was named honorary president.

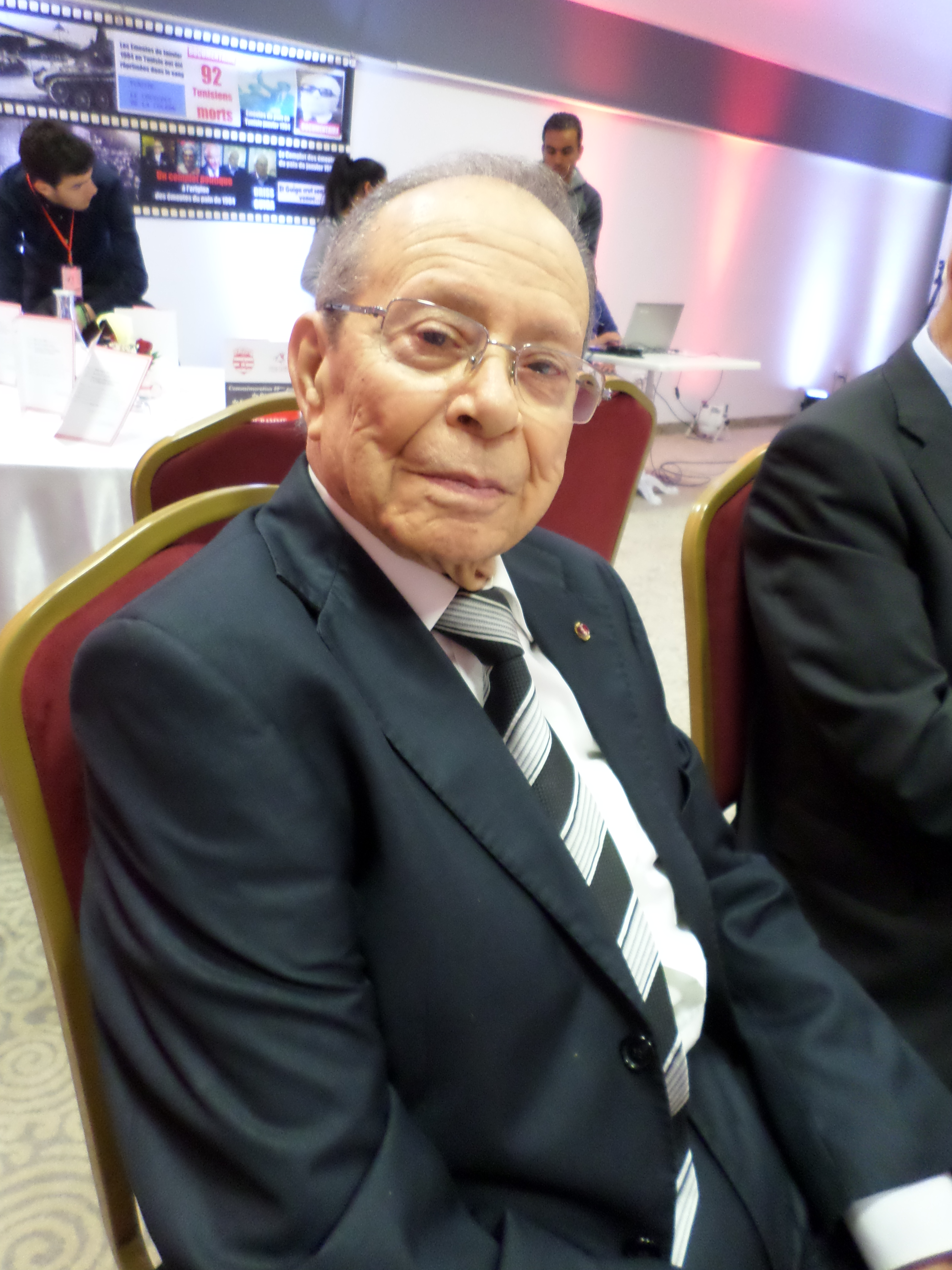
Hamed Karoui, the longest-serving president of the team (1961–1981).

N°	Nat	Name	Period	N°	Nat	Name	Period
1	(Tunisia)	Chedly Boujemla	1925–1926	14	(Tunisia)	Abdeljelil Bouraoui	1981–1984
2	(Tunisia)	Ali Laârbi	1926–1927	15	(Tunisia)	Hamadi Mestiri	1984–1988
3	(Tunisia)	Younès Bouraoui	1927–1929	16	(Tunisia)	Abdeljelil Bouraoui	1988–1990
4	(Tunisia)	Ali Laâdhari	1929–1932	17	(Tunisia)	Hamadi Mestiri	1990–1993
5	(Tunisia)	Mohammed Maârouf	1932–1935	18	(Tunisia)	Othman Jenayah	1993–2006
6	(Tunisia)	Hamed Akacha	1935–1944	19	(Tunisia)	Moez Driss	2006–2009
7	(Tunisia)	Mohamed Ghachem	1944–1953	20	(Tunisia)	Hamed Kammoun	2009–2011
8	(Tunisia)	Sadok Mellouli	1953–1954	21	(Tunisia)	Hafedh Hmaied	2011–2012
9	(Tunisia)	Abdelhamid Sakka	1954–1956	22	(Tunisia)	Ridha Charfeddine	2012–2021
10	(Tunisia)	Ali Driss	1956–1959	23	(Tunisia)	Maher Karoui	2021–2022
11	(Tunisia)	Mohamed Atoui	1959–1960	24	(Tunisia)	Othman Jenayah	2022–2024
12	(Tunisia)	Ali Driss	1960–1961	25	(Tunisia)	Zoubeir Baya	2024–
13	(Tunisia)	Hamed Karoui	1961–1981				

== Infrastructure ==
=== Home stadium ===
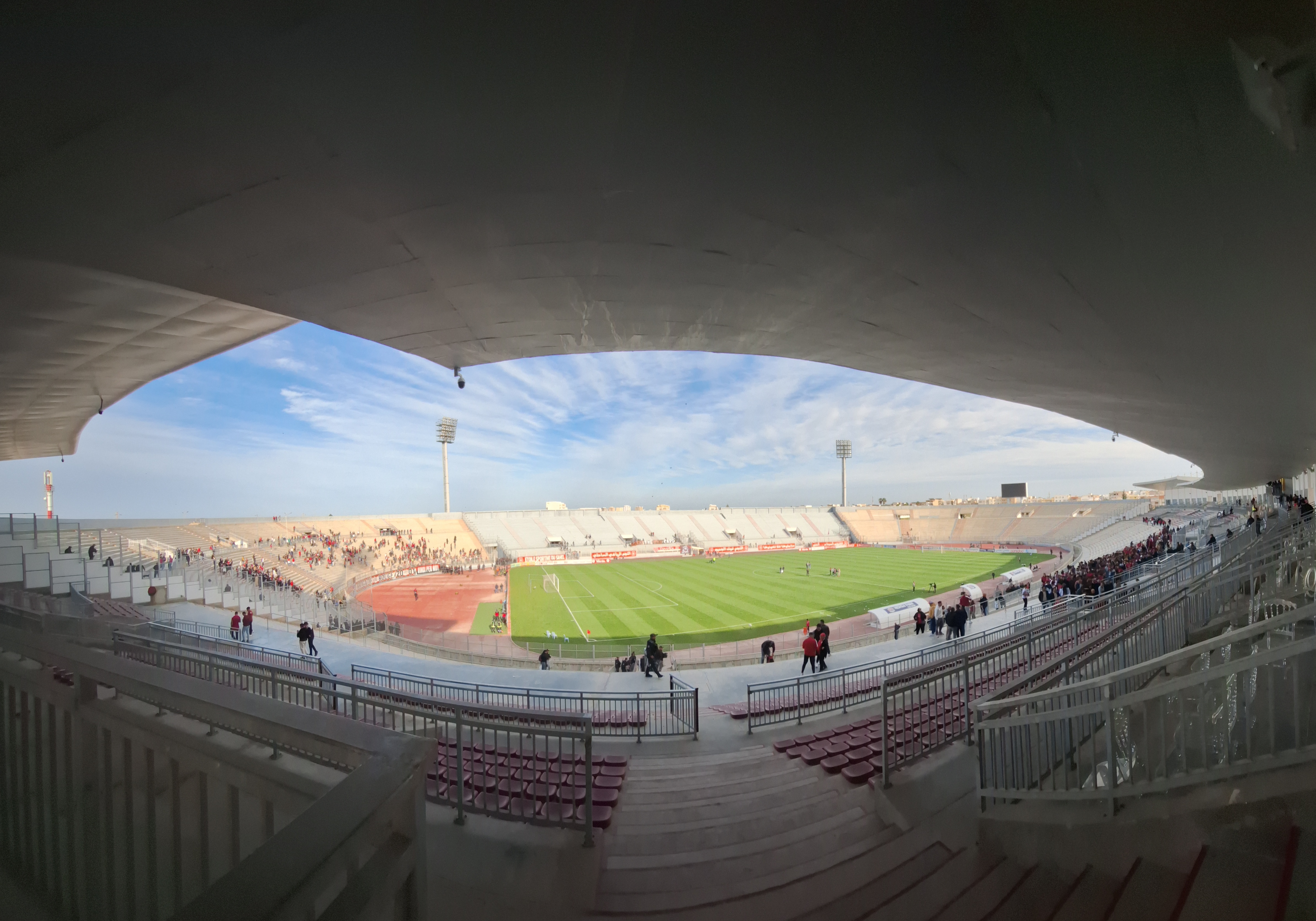
Stade Olympique de Sousse, nicknamed as The cemetery of the invaders.

The home stadium of Étoile du Sahel is the Olympic Stadium of Sousse which is a multi-purpose stadium in Sousse that was inaugurated in 1973. For many decades, Sousse footballers knew only the clay surfaces and knew the turf surfaces only when the stadium was inaugurated with an initial capacity of 10,000 places. Another expansion was carried out in 1999 to bring the capacity of the stadium to 28,000 seats for the 2001 Mediterranean Games, a reorganization of the gallery of honor was carried out, from a capacity of 70 to 217 places. It hosted 1977 FIFA World Youth Championship, 1994 African Cup of Nations, 2001 Mediterranean Games and 2004 African Cup of Nations.

In November 2017, on a visit to the President of the Republic, Beji Caid Essebsi, to Sousse, he gave an indication of the beginning of the expansion of the stadium and thus in 2019, the inauguration ceremony of the beginning of works of the Stadium in order to be able to accommodate 40,000 spectators instead of the current capacity.

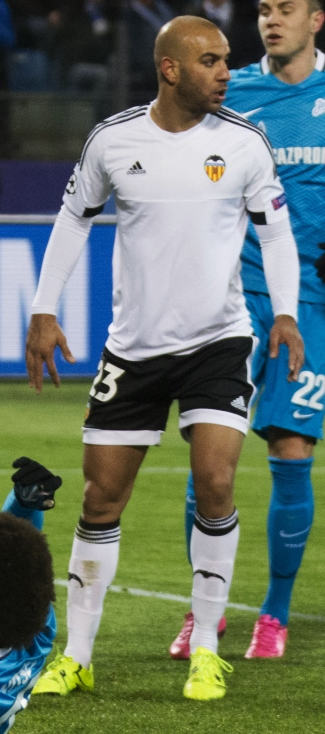
Aymen Abdennour with Valencia in the UEFA CL against Zenit.

The cost of completing the total works was estimated initially at 32 million dinars, including 4 million dinars as a contribution from the Municipality of Sousse and 2 million dinars from the contribution of the team and coastal and is expected to include the expansion of the stadium, which was expected to extend for 27 months, especially covered runways and open runways in the east and north and south will also include works. The Municipality of Sousse decided to enable the team to play local matches at the Stade Municipal Bou Ali-Lahouar in Hammam Sousse in the next two seasons until the completion of the work in the team's stronghold. The Hammam Sousse stadium hosted the 1965 African Cup of Nations and can accommodate 6,500 spectators while the continental matches will be played in Stade 7 November in Radès, biggest stadium of Tunisia. Finally, the works of extension finished at the end of April, 2022 and the first game of the team back in its new 40,000-seater stadium was held on the 4th of May, 2022 against Club Sportif Sfaxien.

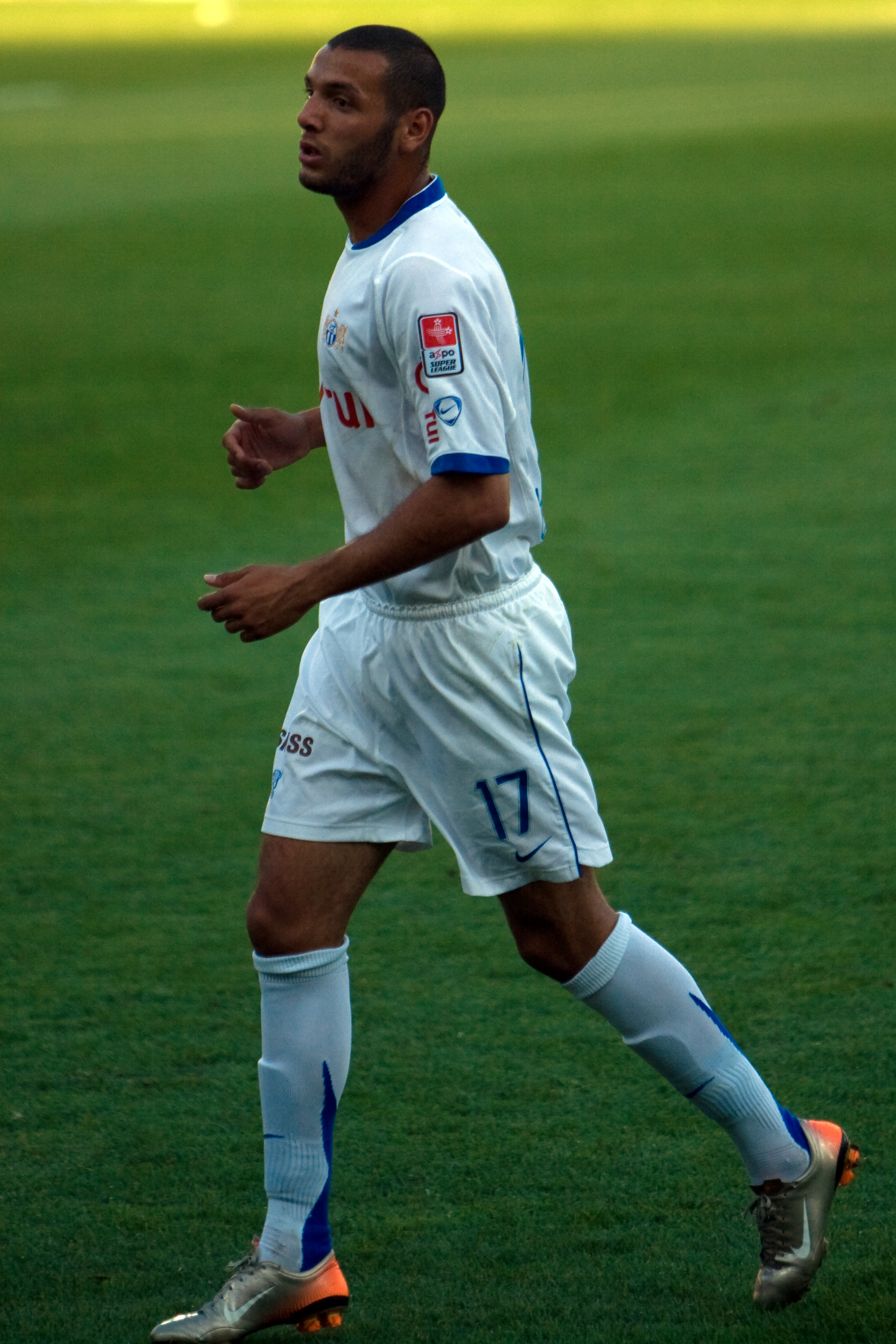
Son of the team Yassine Chikhaoui with FC Zürich.

=== Youth Training Center ===
Taking the example of the European clubs, Étoile Sportive du Sahel has a forming and training center for players located in Sousse. It consists of six football fields including two synthetic, a restaurant, a weight room, a 3-star hotel called "Star's Sport Residence" and a thalassotherapy center. The center allowed the club to export talents to Europe.

The youth training center is hosting 8 types of young football talent active in national and regional championships. Each category includes 20 players and 3 goalkeepers, adding that each category includes a coach, an assistant coach, a goalkeeping coach, a physical coach and a doctor.

== Colors and crests ==
The Étoile Sportive du Sahel has opted from its origin for the colors red and white of the flag of Tunisia. At home, the player wears a red jersey with a five-pointed white star, white shorts and red socks. Outside of Sousse, the player wears a white jersey with a five-pointed red star, red shorts and white socks, or also in blue kits.

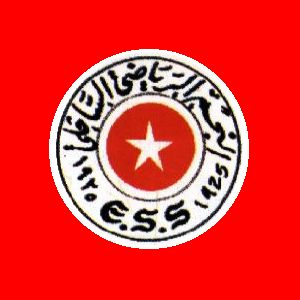
Crest of the team from its foundation in 1925 until independence in 1956

Crest of the team after independence until this moment

Étoile du Sahel's Press Conference Room crest

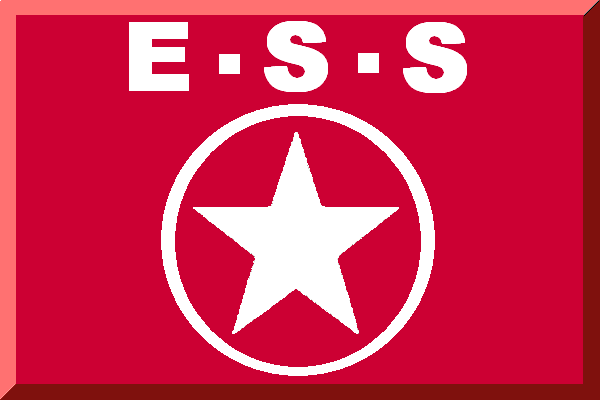
Colors of Étoile Sportive du Sahel

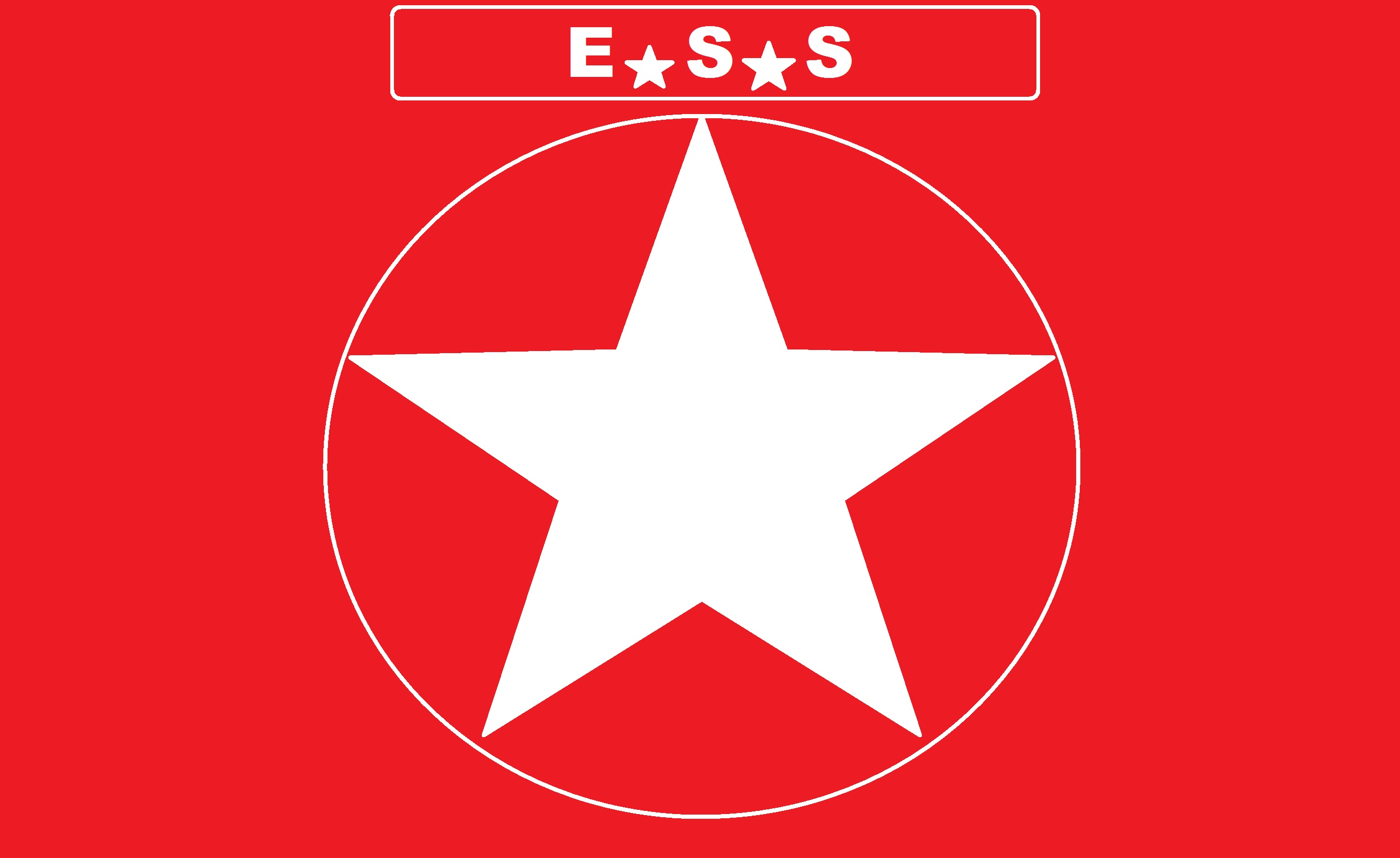
Colors of Étoile Sportive du Sahel

== Supporters ==
Several groups take care of the shows preceding the matches or the beginning of the second half, commonly called dakhla. Brigade Rouge, created in 2001, is a group of supporters belonging to the barra brava movement.

Bouha, the official mascot of the team

Two sources of funding allow the club to survive: sales of by-products (t-shirts, caps, sweaters, scarves, albums, etc.), donations from powerful businessmen and fans. Other groups appeared such as Fanatics in 2003, Saheliano in April 2007, Hools Squad and Red Fans in 2009 or No Fear in 2010.

Name	Abbreviation	Creation Date	Mentality
Brigade Rouge	BR.01	2001	Barra brava
Fanatics	F.03	2003	Ultras
Saheliano	S.07	2007	Ultras
Hools Squad	H.09	2009	Ultras
Red Fans	RF.09	2009	Barra brava
No Fear	NF.10	2010	Ultras

== Kit suppliers and shirt sponsors ==
Period	Kit supplier	Shirt sponsor
1995–1998	(Germany) Adidas	(United States) Coca-Cola
1998–2001	(Germany) Adidas	(United States) Coca-Cola
2001–2003	(Germany) Adidas	(United States) Coca-Cola
2003–2006	(Germany) Adidas	(South Korea) LG (Tunisia) Boga (Tunisia) Tunisie Telecom
2006–2009	(Germany) Adidas	(South Korea) LG (Tunisia) Boga (Tunisia) Tunisie Telecom
2009–2011	(Italy) Diadora	(France) Orange
2011–2012	(United States) Nike	(France) Orange
2012–2017	(Italy) Macron	(Qatar) Ooredoo
2017–2018	(Germany) Adidas	(Qatar) Ooredoo
2018–2021	(Italy) Macron	(South Korea) SsangYong
2021–	(England) Umbro	(Tunisia) Tunisie Telecom
