= Khalid =

Male given name from Arabic

- Pronunciation: Arabic: [ˈxæːlɪd, ˈxæːled, ˈχɑːlɪd]
- Gender: Male

Origin
- Origin: Arabic
- Meaning: "eternal", "endless" or "im-mortal"
- Region of origin: Arabia (Middle East)

Other names
- Related names: Khalida (fem.), Halid (Bosnian), Halit (Turkish), Halide (fem.), Xalîd (Kurdish)

Khalid or Xalîd is a masculine given name and surname of Arabic origin meaning "eternal, everlasting, immortal." Notable people with the name include:

== Given name ==
=== Khalid ===
- Khalid (Bangladeshi singer) (1963/64–2024), Bangladeshi singer
- Khalid (singer) (born 1998), American singer and songwriter
- Khalid (writer) (1930–1994), Indian novelist
- Khalid of Saudi Arabia (1913–1982), Saudi royal
- Khalid El-Aabidi (born 1995), Moroccan Olympic weightlifter
- Khalid El Aamri (born 1977), Moroccan runner
- Khalid Hassan Abbas (1936–2015), Sudanese general and politician
- Khalid Abdalla (born 1980), British actor
- Khalid Abdalla Adam (born 1993), Qatari basketball player
- Khalid Abdel-Hadi (born 1988/89), Jordanian LGBT rights activist and model
- Khalid Abdulla (footballer) (born 1997), Emirati footballer
- Khalid Abdullah (Egyptian), Sudanese-Egyptian fiancé of Zaynab Khadr
- Khalid Abdullah (linebacker) (born 1979), American football player
- Khalid Abdullah (running back) (born 1995), American football player
- Khalid Abdulrahman (born 1965), Saudi singer, actor, musician, poet, and songwriter
- Khalid Abdulraouf (born 1989), Qatari footballer
- Khalid Salim El Abed (born 1993), Dutch-Jordanian footballer
- Khalid Adem (born 1975), Ethiopian-American convicted for female genital mutilation
- Khalid S. Al-Ageel, Saudi engineer and politician
- Khalid Ahmad (1943–2013), Pakistani poet, playwright, and columnist
- Khalid Bashir Ahmad, Indian author, poet, and civil servant
- Khalid Ahmed, Pakistani TV director, producer, and actor
- Khalid Ajab (born 1986), Kuwaiti footballer
- Khalid Akhtar (1920–2002), Pakistani poet
- Khalid Akhtar (sailor) (born 1941), Pakistani sailor
- Khalid Kbiri Alaoui (born 1996), Moroccan footballer
- Khalid Albaih (born 1980), Sudanese political cartoonist, civil rights activist, and journalist
- Khalid Ali (born 1981), Emirati footballer
- Khalid Abu Ali (born 1966), Saudi journalist
- Khalid Omar Ali, Somali politician
- Khalid Alioua (born 1949), Moroccan politician
- Khalid Almoayed, Bahraini businessman and politician
- Khalid Abdullah Almolhem (born 1957), Saudi businessman
- Khalid Mobarak Habeeb-Allah Alqurashi (died 2004), Saudi terrorist
- Khalid Alvi (born 1962), Indian poet and academic
- Khalid Alvi (cricketer) (born 1957), Pakistani cricketer
- Khalid Amayreh (1957–2023), Palestinian journalist
- Khalid Amin (born 1966), Moroccan writer, academic, and researcher
- Khalid El-Amin (born 1979), American basketball player
- Khalid bin Mohammed Al Angari (born 1952), Saudi politician
- Khalid al-Ansari, Syrian judge and politician
- Khalid A. H. Ansari, Indian businessman and journalist
- Khalid Anwar, Indian politician
- Khalid Anwer (1938–2025), Pakistani lawyer and jurist
- Khalid Mahmud Arif (1930–2020), Pakistani Army general
- Khalid al-Aruri (1967–2020), Palestinian-Jordanian Islamic militant
- Khalid Hussain Asad (born 1958), Pakistani Army general
- Khalid ibn Abdallah ibn Khalid ibn Asid, Umayyad prince and statesman
- Khalid Askri (born 1981), Moroccan footballer
- Khalid al-Asmr (born 1963), Jordanian Guantanamo detainee
- Khalid Assar (born 1992), Egyptian table tennis player
- Khalid bin Mohammad al-Attiyah (born 1967), Qatari politician
- Khalid Aucho (born 1993), Ugandan footballer
- Khalid Azim (1975–2023), Indian politician
- Khalid Aziz (1937–2011), Pakistani cricket umpire
- Khalid al-Azm (1903–1965), Syrian politician
- Khalid Baba (born 1996), Bahraini swimmer
- Khalid Abu Bakar (born 1957), Malaysian police officer
- Khalid Bakdash (1912–1995), Syrian politician
- Khalid El Bakouri (born 1994), Dutch-Moroccan kickboxer
- Khalid El Bakraoui (1989–2016), Belgian-Moroccan terrorist
- Khalid Balogun (born 1998), American soccer player
- Khalid Al-Baloushi (born 1999), Emirati footballer
- Khalid Balti (died 2022), Pakistani Tehrik-i-Taliban member
- Khalid bin Barghash of Zanzibar (1874–1927), Sultan of Zanzibar
- Khalid ibn Barmak (709–781/82), Abbasid governor
- Khalid Basalamah (born 1975), Indonesian preacher
- Khalid Bashir (born 1968), Pakistani field hockey player
- Khalid Batarfi (died 2024), Saudi militant
- Khalid Bazzi (1969–2006), Lebanese military commander
- Khalid Belisle (born 1981), Belizean politician
- Khalid Benmahdi (born 1988), Algerian middle-distance runner
- Khalid El-Bied (born 1955), Moroccan footballer
- Khalid Yahya Blankinship (born 1949), American historian
- Khalid Boukichou (born 1992), Belgian-Moroccan basketball player
- Khalid Boulahrouz (born 1981), Dutch footballer
- Khalid Boulami (born 1969), Moroccan long distance runner
- Khalid El-Boumlili (born 1978), Moroccan long-distance runner
- Khalid Saeed al-Bounein, Qatari real estate investor and charity coordinator
- Khalid Bourdif (born 1981), Dutch-Moroccan kickboxer
- Khalid Boutaïb (born 1987), French-Moroccan footballer
- Khalid Al-Braiki (born 1993), Omani footballer
- Khalid bin Hamad Al Busaidi (born 1964), Omani business owner, musician, and sportsman
- Khalid bin Hilal Al Busaidi, Omani politician
- Khalid Butt (actor) (1946–2024), Pakistani actor
- Khalid Butt (footballer) (born 1958), Pakistani footballer
- Khalid Manzoor Butt, Pakistani academic
- Khalid Chalqi (born 1971), Moroccan footballer
- Khalid Ghani Chaudhry (born 1958), Pakistani politician
- Khalid Choukoud (born 1986), Dutch-Moroccan athlete
- Khalid Mahmud Chowdhury (born 1970), Bangladeshi politician
- Khalid Al-Dakhil, Saudi academic
- Khalid Dalwan (born 1984), Qatari singer-songwriter and artist
- Khalid Abbas Dar (born 1946), Pakistani actor
- Khalid Darwish (born 1979), Emirati footballer
- Khalid Al-Dawsari (born 1986), Saudi footballer
- Khalid Deeb (born 1982), Australian rugby league footballer
- Khalid Mohammed Salih Al Dhuby (born 1981), Yemeni Guantanamo detainee
- Khalid Mehmood Dogar, Pakistani politician
- Khalid Al-Dubaysh (born 1998), Saudi footballer
- Khalid Duke (born 2001), American footballer
- Khalid Duran (1939–2010), American academic
- Khalid El Ebrahim (born 1992), Kuwaiti footballer
- Khalid Eisa (born 1989), Emirati footballer
- Khalid Al-Faisal (born 1940), Saudi politician, artist, and poet
- Khalid A. Al-Falih (born 1960), Saudi businessman and politician
- Khalid Fared (footballer) (born 1987), Qatari footballer
- Khalid Farooqi, Afghan politician
- Khalid al-Fawwaz (born 1962), Saudi terrorist
- Khalid ibn Abi Habib al-Fihri (died 740), Arab military commander
- Khalid Fouhami (born 1972), Moroccan football coach and player
- Khalid Gadallah (born 1955), Egyptian footballer
- Khalid Al Hud Al Gargani (1882–1971), Libyan royal advisor in Saudi Arabia
- Khalid Al-Ghamdi (born 1988), Saudi footballer
- Khalid Al-Ghannam (born 2000), Saudi footballer
- Khalid Ghuloom (born 1996), Emirati footballer
- Khalid Al-Ghunaim (1911–1990), Kuwaiti politician
- Khalid Javed Asghar Ghural (born 1968), Pakistani politician
- Khalid Javaid Ghurki (1955–2011), Pakistani politician
- Khalid Al-Ghwinem (born 1999), Saudi footballer
- Khalid Gonçalves (born 1971), American actor
- Khalid Masud Gondal (born 1962), Pakistani university vice-chancellor
- Khalid Habib (died 2008), Egyptian terrorist
- Khalid Hachadi (born 1998), Moroccan footballer
- Khalid Hafiz (1938–1999), Indian Islamic leader
- Khalid Abu El Haija (born 2005), German-Palestinian footballer
- Khalid Al-Hail, Qatari businessman
- Khalid Al-Hajri (born 1994), Omani footballer
- Khalid Hamdaoui (born 1981), Dutch footballer
- Khalid Hameed, Baron Hameed (born 1941), Indian-British scientist and politician
- Khalid Hameed (newscaster), Pakistani newscaster
- Khalid Hamid (born 1962), Pakistani field hockey player
- Khalid Al-Harbi (born 1975), Saudi table tennis player
- Khalid Hasan (1934–2009), Pakistani journalist and writer
- Khalid Hasan (cricketer) (1937–2013), Pakistani cricketer
- Khalid Al-Hashemi (born 1997), Emirati footballer
- Khalid Hashim, Egyptian engineer and politician
- Khalid Hassan (died 2007), Iraqi journalist
- Khalid Hassanali, Trinbagonian businessman
- Khalid Hossain (1935–2019), Bangladeshi singer
- Khalid Hotak (born 1991), Afghan wushu practitioner
- Khalid Sulayman Jaydh Al Hubayshi (born 1975), Saudi Guantanamo detainee
- Khalid ibn Sufyan al-Hudhali (died 625), Arab tribesman
- Khalid bin Ali Al Humaidan (born 1955), Saudi intelligence officer
- Khalid Hussain (born 1969), Norwegian-Pakistani writer and film producer
- Khalid Hussain (Punjabi writer) (born 1945), Indian writer
- Khalid Ibrahim (1946–2022), Malaysian politician
- Khalid Iqbal (1929–2014), Pakistani painter and art teacher
- Khalid Irfan (born 1977), Pakistani-American poet and humorist
- Khalid Ishaq (1926–2004), Pakistani jurist
- Khalid Al-Islambuli (1955–1982), Egyptian assassin
- Khalid Ismail (born 1965), Emirati footballer
- Khalid Izri (born 1969), Moroccan singer
- Khalid Al-Jaber, Qatari academic
- Khalid Mohamed Al Jaber, Qatari biker and traveler
- Khalid Jaberti (born 1984), Ethiopian footballer
- Khalid al-Jader (1922–1988), Iraqi artist, administrator, and scholar
- Khalid Jalal (born 1991), Emirati footballer
- Khalid Jamai (1944–2021), Moroccan journalist, writer, and political analyst
- Khalid Jamil (born 1977), Indian football player and manager
- Khalid Jamil (Pakistan Navy officer), Pakistani naval officer and politician
- Khalid Jassem (born 1974), Qatari television presenter, television host, interviewer, and writer
- Khalid Javed, Pakistani politician
- Khalid Jawad (1954–1972), Palestinian militant
- Khalid Duhham Al-Jawary (born 1945), Jordanian-Iraqi convicted terrorist
- Khalid Jawed (born 1960), Indian novelist
- Khalid Ibrahim Jouma (born 1962), Bahraini sprinter
- Khalid Al Jubaya (born 1999), Saudi footballer
- Khalid al-Juhani (died 2003), Saudi terrorist
- Khalid Kaabi (born 1992), Saudi footballer
- Khalid Kadyrov (born 1994), Russian footballer
- Khalid Kail (born 1996), Pakistani cricketer
- Khalid Karami (born 1989), Dutch footballer
- Khalid Kareem (born 1998), American footballer
- Khalid Kelly (1967–2016), Irish terrorist
- Khalid bin Abdullah Al Khalifa (born 1944), Bahraini royal, engineer, and politician
- Khalid bin Ahmed Al Khalifa (born 1960), Bahraini diplomat
- Khalid bin Ali Al Khalifa, Bahraini royal
- Khalid bin Hamad Al Khalifa (born 1989), Bahraini royal and military officer
- Khalid Khan (Hong Kong cricketer) (born 1971), Hong Kong cricketer
- Khalid Khan (politician), Pakistani politician
- Khalid Amir Khan (1934–??), Pakistani diplomat and politician
- Khalid Ibrahim Khan (1948–2018), Pakistani politician
- Khalid Jawed Khan, Pakistani lawyer
- Khalid Nawaz Khan, Pakistan Army general
- Khalid Khannouchi (born 1971), Moroccan-American marathoner
- Khalid Ahmed Kharal (1939–2017), Pakistani politician
- Khalid Khawaja (1951–2010), Pakistani fighter pilot and intelligence officer
- Khalid Khurshid (born 1980), Pakistani politician
- Khalid Kishtainy (1929–2023), Iraqi writer and satirist
- Khalid Al-Koroni (born 1959), Saudi football coach and player
- Khalid Al-Kulaibi (born 1986), Omani swimmer
- Khalid Labied (born 1955), Moroccan footballer
- Khalid Lachheb (born 1975), French pole vaulter
- Khalid Latif (cricketer) (born 1985), Pakistani cricketer
- Khalid Latif (imam) (born 1982), Indian Muslim chaplain
- Khalid Tawfik Lazim (born 1944), Iraqi sprinter
- Khalid Lebhij (born 1985), Moroccan footballer
- Khalid Ahmed Khan Lund, Pakistani politician
- Khalid al-Maaly (born 1956), Iraqi writer, poet, and publisher
- Khalid Hussain Magsi (born 1960), Pakistani politician
- Khalid bin Mahfouz (1949–2009), Saudi businessman and suspected terrorist
- Khalid Mahmood, multiple people
- Khalid Mahmud (1925–2020), Pakistani Islamic scholar
- Khalid ʽAbd al-Majid (born 1960), Palestinian politician and militia leader
- Khalid Mansoor, Pakistani businessman and politician
- Khalid Al-Mansour (born 1965), Saudi footballer
- Khalid Maqbool (born 1948), Pakistani military officer
- Khalid bin Omar bin Said al Marhoon, Omani politician
- Khalid ibn Abd al-Malik al-Marwarrudhi, Iranian astronomer
- Khalid Al Maskati (born 1959), Bahraini businessman and politician
- Khalid Zaffar Masoodi (born 1979), Indian doctor
- Khalid al-Masri, German citizen detained and interrogated by the CIA
- Khalid Masud (1935–2003), Pakistani Islamic scholar
- Khalid Ali Matar (born 1989), Emirati footballer
- Khalid Al Mawali (born 1975), Omani politician and entrepreneur
- Khalid Mehsud (died 2018), Pakistani terrorist
- Khalid Al Merreikhi (born 1968), Qatari footballer
- Khalid Ali Mia (1932–1981), Bangladeshi politician
- Khalid al-Mihdhar (1975–2001), Saudi terrorist
- Khalid Hassan Milu (1960–2005), Bangladeshi singer
- Khalid al-Mishri (born 1969), Libyan politician
- Khalid Mohamed, Indian journalist, editor, film critic, screenwriter, and film director
- Khalid Ahmed Mohamed (born 1976), Bahraini sport shooter
- Khalid Salum Mohamed (born 1961), Tanzanian politician
- Khalid Mohammed (footballer) (born 1998), English footballer
- Khalid Sheikh Mohammed (born 1964), Kuwaiti-born Pakistani militant
- Khalid Moore (born 2000), American basketball player
- Khalid Saleem Mota (born 1947), Pakistani comedian and actor
- Khalid Moultrie (born 1995), American actor
- Khalid Muftah (born 1992), Qatari footballer
- Khalid Abdul Muhammad (1948–2001), American Black Nationalist
- Khalid Muhmood (born 1970), English academic and entrepreneur
- Khalid Mumin, American educator
- Khalid Muneer (bron 1998), Qatari footballer
- Khalid Al Munif (born 1975), Saudi author
- Khalid Mushir (born 1981), Iraqi footballer
- Khalid Abdullah Mishal al Mutairi (born 1975), Kuwaiti Guantanamo detainee
- Khalid Naciri (1946–2023), Moroccan politician
- Khalid Al-Nafisi (1937–2006), Kuwaiti actor
- Khalid Al-Nasrallah (born 1987), Kuwaiti writer
- Khalid Abdel Nasser (1949–2011), Egyptian activist and dissident
- Khalid Zubair Nisar, Pakistani politician
- Khalid Nizami (1947–2026), Pakistani actor and music composer
- Khalid al-Odah, Kuwaiti activist
- Khalid Ait Ouarkhane (born 2000), Moroccan footballer
- Khalid Outaleb (born 1963), Moroccan tennis player
- Khalid Pashtoon (born 1959), Afghan politician
- Khalid Payenda, Afghan politician
- Khalid bin Ahmad Al Qasimi (died 1950), Emirati royal
- Khalid bin Muhammad Al Qasimi (1931–1972), Emirati politician
- Khalid bin Saqr Al Qasimi (born 1940), Emirati royal
- Khalid bin Sultan Al Qasimi (fashion designer) (1980–2019), Emirati royal and fashion designer
- Khalid bin Sultan Al Qasimi (ruler) (died 1868), Emirati royal
- Khalid Hussain Qasmi (born 1978), Indian Islamic scholar, educator, and writer
- Khalid al-Qasri (died 743), Umayyad governor of Mecca and Iraq
- Khalid Al Qassimi (born 1972), Emirati rally driver
- Khalid Qazi, Indian-American internist and residency program director
- Khalid Qureshi (1928–2016), Pakistani cricketer
- Khalid Raad, Syrian economist and politician
- Khalid Radhy (born 1981), Saudi footballer
- Khalid Raghib (born 1969), Moroccan footballer
- Khalid Rahilou (born 1966), French-Moroccan boxer and kickboxer
- Khalid Abdul Rahim (born 1962), Bahraini business magnate and construction tycoon
- Khalid Rahman (born 1990), Indian film director and actor
- Khalid Saifullah Rahmani (born 1956), Indian Muslim scholar, author, and jurist
- Khalid Ranjha, Pakistani lawyer and a politician
- Khalid Al-Rashaid (born 1974), Saudi footballer
- Khalid Rashid (born 1970), Saudi Islamic preacher
- Khalid Reeves (born 1972), American basketball player
- Khalid Rehmat (born 1968), Pakistani Roman Catholic bishop
- Khalid Al Rowaihi (1972–1993), Saudi footballer
- Khalid Rushaka (born 1980), Tanzanian competitive swimmer
- Khalid Ali Sabah (born 2001), Qatari footballer
- Khalid Mohammed Sabbar (born 1973), Iraqi footballer
- Khalid Saeed (politician) (born 1958), Pakistani politician
- Khalid ibn Sa'id (died 634), Arab companion of the prophet Muhammad
- Khalid Salimi (born 1954), Norwegian-Pakistani human rights activist and arts critic
- Khalid Salleh (1948–2018), Malaysian actor and poet
- Khalid Salman (born 1962), Qatari footballer
- Khalid Abdul Samad (born 1957), Malaysian politician
- Khalid bin Abdullah Al Saud (1937–2021) (1937–2021), Saudi royal
- Khalid bin Abdullah Al Saud (1941–1985) (1941–1985), Saudi royal
- Khalid bin Abdullah Al Saud (born 1950) (born 1950), Saudi royal
- Khalid bin Bandar Al Saud (born 1951) (born 1951), Saudi royal
- Khalid bin Bandar Al Saud (born 1977) (born 1977), Saudi royal and diplomat
- Khalid bin Muhammad Al Saud (1904–1938), Saudi royal
- Khalid bin Salman Al Saud (born 1988), Saudi diplomat and politician
- Khalid bin Saud Al Saud (1925–2020), Saudi royal
- Khalid bin Saud Al Saud (1811–1865) (1811–1865), Saudi politician
- Khalid bin Sultan Al Saud (born 1948), Saudi businessman, royal, and politician
- Khalid bin Talal Al Saud (born 1962), Saudi royal and businessman
- Khalid bin Sayeed (1926–2011), Pakistani-Canadian political scientist and historian
- Khalid Sebil (born 1987), Emirati footballer
- Khalid Sekkat (born 1984), Moroccan footballer
- Khalid bin Mohsen Shaari (born 1991), Saudi record holder
- Khalid Bin Mubarak Al-Shafi, Qatari columnist
- Khalid Hasan Shah (1934–1991), Pakistani Islamic religious leader
- Khalid Shahanshah (died 2008), Pakistani politician
- Khalid Shahdan (born 1964), Malaysian football player and coach
- Khalid Shahmah, Libyan military officer
- Khalid Al-Shaibani (born 1997), Emirati footballer
- Khalid Sharahili (born 1988), Saudi footballer
- Khalid Sharrouf (born 1981), Australian-Arab hate speaker and terror suspect
- Khalid Shatta (born 1989), Norwegian–Sudanese contemporary visual artist
- Khalid al-Shaybani (born 1979), Egyptian poet, novelist, and screenwriter
- Khalid ibn Yazid al-Shaybani, Arab general and governor for the Abbasid Caliphate
- Khalid Al-Shehhi (born 1997), Emirati footballer
- Khalid Sheldrake (1888–1947), English pickle manufacturer and philanthropist
- Khalid Al-Shenaif (born 1973), Saudi footballer
- Khalid Al-Shuwayyi (born 1996), Saudi footballer
- Khalid Siddiqui (born 1971), Indian model and actor
- Khalid Maqbool Siddiqui, Pakistani politician
- Khalid Sinouh (born 1975), Dutch-Moroccan footballer
- Khalid Al-Siyabi (1972/73–2019), Omani civil servant and mountaineer
- Khalid Skah (born 1967), Moroccan athlete
- Khalid Mehmood Soomro (1959–2014), Pakistani physician, politician, and religious leader
- Khalid Springer (born 1982), Barbadian cricketer
- Khalid Al-Subaie (born 1999), Saudi footballer
- Khalid Suliman (born 1987), Qatari basketball player
- Khalid Habash Al-Suwaidi (born 1984), Qatari shot putter
- Khalid Tadmine (born 1995), Dutch-Moroccan footballer
- Khalid Taha (born 1992), German mixed martial artist
- Khalid Aït Taleb (born 1966), Moroccan medical professor and politician
- Khalid Al-Temawi (born 1969), Saudi footballer
- Khalid bin Hamad Al Thani (born 1986), Qatari royal
- Khalid bin Hamad Al Thani (born 1935) (born 1935), Qatari royal and politician
- Khalid bin Khalifa bin Abdul Aziz Al Thani (born 1968), Qatari politician
- Khalid Tighazouine (born 1977), Moroccan middle distance runner
- Khalid Al-Turais (born 1987), Saudi football referee
- Khalid ibn Urfuta, Arab military leader
- Khalid Usman (born 1986), Pakistani cricketer
- Khalid Bin Vilayat (born 1967), Pakistani politician
- Khalid ibn al-Walid (died 642), Arab military commander in the service of the Rashidun Caliphate
- Khalid Wazir (1936–2022), Pakistani cricketer
- Khalid Wooten (born 1990), American football player
- Khalid Shameem Wynne (1953–2017), Pakistani Army general
- Khalid Kamal Yaseen (born 1982), Bahraini long-distance runner
- Khalid Yasin (born 1946), American Islamic preacher
- Khalid Iqbal Yasir (born 1952), Pakistani author, scholar, poet, and journalist
- Khalid ibn Yazid (668–??), Umayyad prince and purported alchemist
- Khalid Zahedi (born 1998), Afghan cricketer
- Khalid al-Zahrani, Saudi Guantanamo detainee
- Khalid ibn Hamid al-Zanati, Zenata Berber chieftain and military commander
- Khalid Al-Zari (born 1996), Emirati footballer
- Khalid Zoubaa (born 1977), French long-distance runner

=== Xalîd ===
- Xalîd Reşîd (born 1968), Iraqi-Swedish musician

== Surname ==
- Aisha Khalid (born 1972), Pakistani artist
- Jameela Ali Khalid, Maldivian diplomat
- Rehman Khalid (born 1993), Pakistani baseball player
