= Munif =

Munif is an Arabic male given name, which means "exalted". Munif may refer to:

- Abdel Rahman Munif (1933–2004), Saudi Arabian novelist
- Ali Münif Yeğenağa, Ottoman politician and government minister
- Djelal Munif Bey (died 1919), Turkish diplomat
- Khalid Al Munif, Saudi Arabian author
- Mehmed Tahir Münif Pasha, Ottoman writer and statesman
- Munif al-Razzaz (1919–1984), Syrian politician
- Munif Mohammed Abou Rish (died 1974), Palestinian journalist
- Ras Munif, a town in Jordan

== See also ==
- Manaf (disambiguation)
- Munaf (disambiguation)
