= Al-Khalidiya =

al-Khalidiya or al-Khalidiyah (Arabic: الخالدية, "belonging to Khalid") may refer to:

- al-Khalidiya, Iraq, a city in Iraq
- al-Khalidiya, Kuwait City, a suburb of Kuwait City
- al-Khalidiya, Mecca, a district in Mecca, Saudi Arabia
- al-Khalidiyah, al-Hasakah Governorate or Khanik, the easternmost settlement of Syria
- al-Khalidiyah, Syria, another village in Syria

Khalidiya or Khalidiyah may also refer to:

- Khalidiyah Mall in Abu Dhabi

== See also ==
- Khalidiyya, a Naqshbandiyya Sufi lineage
- Khalidi (surname)
- Khalid (disambiguation)
