= Khalid Said =

Khalid Sa'id or Khalid Saeed is the name of:

- Khalid ibn Sa'id (d. 634 CE), a companion of Muhammad
- Khalid Saeed Ahmad al Zahrani, Saudi Arabian al-Qaida militant and Guantanamo detainee
- Khalid Saeed Batarfi, Saudi Arabian al-Qaida militant
- Khalid Saeed Khan (born 1954), Pakistani physiotherapist
- Khalid Saeed (politician) (born 1958), Pakistani politician
- Khalid Saeed Sajna, Pakistani Taliban commander
- Khalid Saeed Yafai (born 1989), British boxer
- Khaled Mohamed Saeed (1982–2010), Egyptian victim of police brutality leading to the 2011 Egyptian Revolution; see Death of Khaled Mohamed Saeed
