= Khaled (surname) =

Khaled is a surname. Notable people with the surname include:

- Amr Khaled, an American Muslim activist and television preacher
- Ahmed Khaled, an Egyptian football player
- Fares Khaled, an Egyptian football player
- Leila Khaled, a Palestinian refugee and member of the Popular Front for the Liberation of Palestine
- Mahjabeen Khaled, a Bangladeshi politician from the Bangladesh Awami League party

== See also ==
- Khaled (disambiguation)
- Khalid
