= Humaid Saleh =

Emirati association football player (born 1996)

Humaid Saleh حميد صالح
Personal information
- Full name: Humaid Abdulla Saleh Al-Hammadi
- Date of birth: 7 April 1996 (age 30)
- Place of birth: Emirates
- Height: 1.70 m (5 ft 7 in)
- Position: Winger

Youth career
- 2008–2014: Al-Shaab

Senior career*
Years	Team	Apps	(Gls)
2014–2017	Al-Shaab	37	(1)
2017–2018	Al-Sharjah	0	(0)
2018–2022	Ajman	32	(1)
2023	Al Dhaid		
2023–2024	Al Arabi		
2024	Al Taawon		
2025	Al Jazirah Al-Hamra		
- * Club domestic league appearances and goals

Humaid Abdulla Saleh (Arabic:حميد عبد الله صالح) (born 7 April 1996) is an Emirati footballer who plays as a winger.

== Career ==
=== Al-Shaab ===
Humaid Saleh started his career at Al-Shaab and is a product of the Al-Shaab's youth system. On 7 February 2014, Humaid Saleh made his professional debut for Al-Shaab against Al-Ahli in the Pro League, replacing Ahmad Eisa Kamil.

=== Al-Sharjah ===
He was playing with Al-Shaab and after merging Al-Sharjah, and Al-Shaab clubs under the name Al-Sharjah he was joined to Al-Sharjah.

=== Ajman ===
On 8 September 2018, left Al-Sharjah and signed with Ajman. On 13 December 2018, Humaid Abdulla made his professional debut for Ajman against Al-Dhafra in the Pro League, replacing Mohammed Ahmad.
