= Shabeeb bin Arar =

- شبيب بن عرار
- Born: Shabeeb bin Arar Alnuaimi; 15 August 1981 (age 45); Doha, Qatar
- Education: Qatar University
- Occupations: Singer-songwriter, poet
- Years active: 2008–present

Shabeeb bin Arar (Arabic: شبيب بن عرار; born 15 August 1981) is a Qatari singer-songwriter and poet.

== Education and Career ==
Shabeeb bin Arar Alnuaimi was born in Doha. He holds a bachelor's degree in economics from the Qatar University. He belongs to the Al Nuaimi tribe.

Bin Arar was elected president of Qatar Poetry Center, which is affiliated with the Qatari Ministry of Culture.

== See also ==
- Khalid Dalwan
