= Majid Al-Majid =

Saudi Arabian folk singer (1966–2018)

Majid Al-Majid (Arabic: ماجد الماجد;1966 – 5 August 2018) was a Saudi folk singer who started his career in the mid-1980s, and produced 14 albums, including "Stronger Hajar", "Remember Me" and "Ya Hajri".

Al-Majid collaborated with many poets and composers, like Khalid Abdul Rahman in the song "Ra'ash Alby Sahar Einak" and "From the torment of dimension". He also collaborated with Khalid Al-Olayan, Mubarak Al Mansour, Salah Mohammed, Ahmed Al-Jufi, Fahad Al-Madi and Khalid Al Majed.

Majed al-Majid was shot in the head by mistake and was transferred to intensive care after the incident. He died on Sunday evening 5 August 2018. His funeral was held at Al-Bawardi Mosque in Al-Azizia district in Riyadh and he was buried in the Mansurian cemeteries.

== Discography ==
- Tabki Eini
- A Tear of Sadness
- Yalli Rahlati
- Remember Me
- The Moon Has Gone
- People of Singing
- Message
- Ya Hajarni
- Your Mark
- Flood
- Expatriate in Torment - collaboration with Khalid Abdulrahman
- Strengthens Abandonment
