= Halit =

Halit is the Turkish spelling of the Arabic masculine given name Khalid (Arabic: خَالِد khālid) meaning eternal, everlasting, immortal.

== People named Halit ==
- Halit Akçatepe (1938–2017), Turkish actor
- Halit Akmansü (1883–1953), Ottoman Turkish military officer
- Halit Haluk Babacan (born 1966), Turkish sailor
- Halit Balamir (1922–2009), Turkish wrestler
- Halit Edip Başer (1942–2021), Turkish general
- Halit Berzeshta (1840–1909), Albanian warlord
- Halit Cıngıllıoglu (born 1954), Turkish businessman
- Halit Deringör (1922–2018), Turkish football player
- Halit Ergenç (born 1970), Turkish actor
- Halit Karsıalan (1883–1925), commonly known as "Deli" Halid Pasha, Ottoman Turkish military officer
- Halit Kılıç (born 1992), Turkish athlete
- Halit Kıvanç (1925–2022), Turkish journalist
- Hâlit Ziyâ Konuralp (1904–2005), Turkish physician
- Halit Refiğ (1934–2009), Turkish film director
- Halit Özgür Sarı (born 1993), Turkish actor
- Halit Shamata (born 1954), Albanian author and politician
- Halit Ziya Uşaklıgil (1866–1945), Turkish author

== Middle name ==
- Colo Halit Ahmet (born 1986), known as Colo Halit, Swedish football player
- Yaşar Halit Çevik (born 1955), Turkish diplomat
- Refik Halit Karay (1888–1965), Turkish writer and journalist

== See also ==
- Khalid (disambiguation)
