= Ministry of Civil Service =

Ministry of Civil Services or Ministry of Civil Service may refer to:

- Ministry of Civil Service (Ethiopia)
- Ministry of Civil Service (Kuwait)
- Ministry of Civil Service (Oman)
- Ministry of Civil Service (Saudi Arabia)
- Ministry of Civil Service (Taiwan)
- Ministry of Civil Service Affairs and Housing, Qatar
- Ministry of Civil Service and Administrative Reforms, Mauritius
- Ministry of Civil Service and Insurance, Yemen
- Ministry of Civil Service and Sports (Austria)
- Ministry of the Civil Service (Barbados)
- Shikibu-shō, a ministry in the Imperial Japanese court
