= Khaled =

Khaled is a male Arabic name after Khalid ibn al-Walid who was the general of the first Caliph Abu Bakr; it may refer to:

== People ==
- Khaled Azhari (born 1966), Egyptian politician
- Khaled Chehab (1886–1978), Lebanese politician
- Khaled El Sayed (born 1948), Lebanese actor and voice actor
- Khaled Jarrar (born 1976), Palestinian visual artist
- Khaled Louma (1955–2025), Algerian musician and radio presenter
- Khaled Sheikh, Yemeni diplomat
- Khaled Sobhi (born 1995), Egyptian footballer
- Khaled (musician) (born 1960), an Algerian Raï musician
- DJ Khaled (born 1975), a Palestinian-American DJ
- Khaled (surname), surname

== Other ==
- Khaled (album), the self-titled album by the Algerian musician (above)
- Khaled (film), a 2001 Canadian drama film, directed by Asghar Massombagi
- Khaled (horse), thoroughbred racehorse
- Khaled: A Tale of Arabia, an 1891 novel by F. Marion Crawford

== See also ==
- Khalid (disambiguation)
