= Khalid Dalwan =

Qatari singer, poet & artist (born 1984)

- خالد دلوان
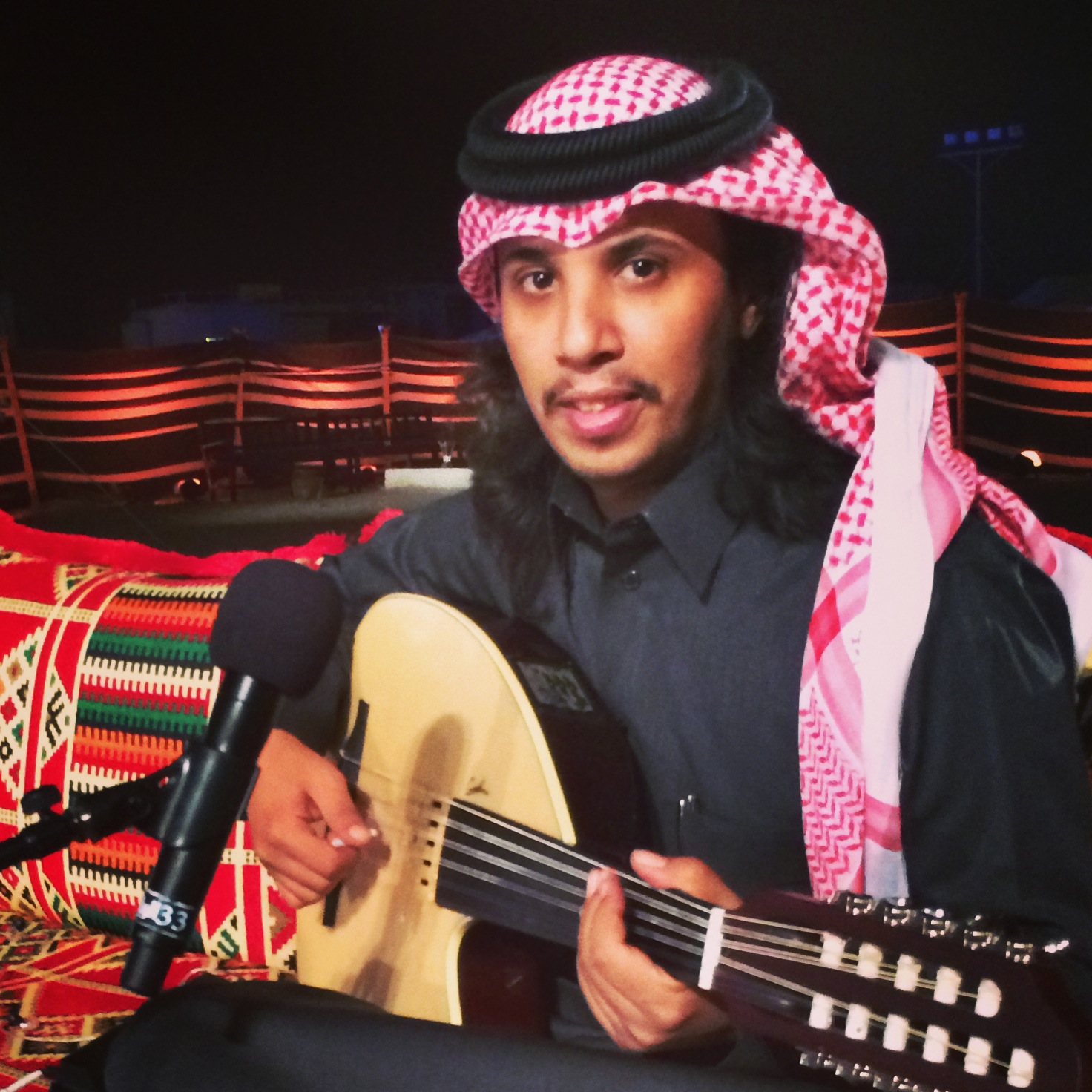
- Born: Khalid Dalwan; 21 August 1984 (age 42); Doha, Qatar
- Education: Qatar University
- Occupations: Singer-songwriter, artist
- Years active: 2008–present

Khalid Dalwan (Arabic: خالد دلوان; born 21 August 1984) is a Qatari singer-songwriter and artist.

== Education ==
Khalid Dalwan was born in Doha. He holds a bachelor's degree in mathematics from Qatar University. He belongs to the Al Murrah tribe, specifically the Al Buhayh clan. In 1994, the Qatari Minister of Education, Abdullah bin Turki, honored him with a shield of excellence and a certificate of appreciation after he sang one of his father's poems. His father, the poet Fahd Al-Marri, was one of Qatar's most prominent poets, and Khalid sang his poem "Ya Zein Shouf Al-Barr".

His beginnings were limited to poetry before he started singing. He appeared in a patriotic music video alongside Qatari singers and went on to have several artistic works. He collaborated with many singers, most notably the Saudi artist Khalid AbdulRahman, the Saudi folk artist Azazi, and the Yemeni artist Aboud Khawaja. He participated in Qatari festivals such as the Souq Waqif Spring Festival and the Doha Festival.

Dalwan is a member of Tethkar Art Production Company and Al Rayyan Media Company.
