= Khalid Al-Zari =

Emirati footballer (born 1996)

Personal information
- Full name: Khalid Nasser Rashed Al-Zari
- Date of birth: 13 May 1996 (age 30)
- Place of birth: United Arab Emirates
- Height: 1.70 m (5 ft 7 in)
- Position: Right back

Youth career
- Al-Sharjah

Senior career*
Years	Team	Apps	(Gls)
2015–2018	Al-Sharjah	13	(1)
2018–2021	Ajman	31	(0)
2021–2025	Kalba	30	(0)
2024–2025	→ Dubai United (loan)		
2025–2026	Emirates		
- * Club domestic league appearances and goals

Khalid Al-Zari (Arabic:خالد الزري) (born 13 May 1996) is an Emirati footballer. He currently plays as a right back.

== Career ==
=== Al-Sharjah ===
Al-Zari started his career at Al-Sharjah and is a product of the Al-Sharjah's youth system. On 22 January 2016, Al Zari made his professional debut for Al-Sharjah against Al-Jazira in the Pro League, replacing Maicosuel .

He was playing with Al-Sharjah and after merging Al-Sharjah, and Al-Shaab clubs under the name Al-Sharjah he was joined to Al-Sharjah.

=== Ajman ===
On 22 June 2018, left Al-Sharjah and signed with Ajman. On 26 October 2018, Al Zari made his professional debut for Ajman against Al-Ain in the Pro League, replacing Mohammed Ahmad .
