= Khalid Mahmood =

Khalid Mahmood may refer to:

- Khalid Mahmood (athlete), Pakistani Paralympic athlete
- Khalid Mahmood (British politician) (born 1961)
- Khalid Mahmood (civil servant), Pakistani civil servant
- Khalid Mahmood (cricketer) (born 1976), Pakistani cricketer
- Khalid Mahmood (field hockey) (1941–2026), Pakistani field hockey player
- Khalid Mahmood (Jamaat-e-Islami) (born 1956), Pakistani politician
- Khalid Mahmood (Norwegian politician) (born 1959), Pakistani-Norwegian politician
- Khalid Mahmood (umpire) (born 1969), Pakistani cricket umpire
- Khalid Mahmood Mithu (1960–2016), Bangladeshi film director and painter
- Khalid Mahmood Ranjha, Pakistani politician
- Khalid Mahmood Rashid, Pakistani terror suspect
- Khalid Mahmud (1925–2020), Pakistani Islamic scholar
- Khaled Mahmud (born 1971), Bandladeshi cricketer
