= Manaf =

Manaf (Arabic: مناف Manāf ) may refer to:

- Manaf (deity), a pre-Islamic Arabian deity

Ancient Arab names based on the phrase Abd Manaf (lit. slave of Manaf):

- Abd Manaf ibn Qusai, great-great-grandfather of the Islamic prophet Muhammad
- Hashim ibn Abd Manaf great-grandfather of the Islamic prophet Muhammad
- Muttalib ibn Abd Manaf, one of the ancestors of the Sahaba (Muhammad's companions)

A modern male given name:

- Manaf Abushgeer (born 1980), Saudi Arabian football player
- Manaf Abd al-Rahim al-Rawi (died 2013), Iraqi jihadist
- Manaf Suleymanov (1912–2001), Azerbaijani writer
- Manaf Tlass (born 1964), Syrian general

== See also ==
- Munaf (disambiguation)
- Munif
