= Tethkar Art Production =

Tethkar Art Production تذكار للانتاج الفني
- Company type: Private
- Industry: Entertainment
- Founded: 2000; 26 years ago
- Founder: Faleh bin Ghanem Al-Thani
- Headquarters: Doha and Kuwait City, Qatar
- Products: Feature films; Documentaries; Music; Show; Series; Short Film
- Owner: Faleh bin Ghanem Al-Thani
- Website: tethkar.qa/index-arb.html

Tethkar Art Production (Arabic: تذكار للانتاج الفني) is a Qatari film, music and art production company based in Doha and Kuwait. The company was established in 2000 by Faleh bin Ghanem Al-Thani. The company activities initially focused on television production and expanded over time to include the creation of multiple television programs, advertisements, and music videos. By 2018, the company had produced approximately 17 television projects.

Tethkar also launched its own radio station, Tethkar FM, and is the owner of Olive FM, a private Hindi-language radio station in Qatar.

== Theatre ==
Year	Title	Notes	Ref
2000	Nour Felqasr Almahjor		
2006	زعتر مان (Zaatar Man)	Children's play	
2006	Fulla and Majod		
2006	Yawash Yawash		
2007	ABCD Kuwaiti Childreen		
2007	Zoro		
2007	Shamshom Alshrer		
2007	شاطر شاطر (Shater Shater)	Children's play	
2023	ينانوة سيلين (Ynanw Seleen)		
2023	المغيسل (Almogesl)		
2024	Alyathoom		
2024	Made in Kuwait		
2025	1 كيفان قطعة		

== Television ==
Year	Title	Notes	Ref
2014	خف علينا (Khof Alena	Series broadcast on Qatar Television	
2017	الشرخ (Alsharkh)	TV film broadcast on Qatar Television	
2018	برودكاست (Broadcast)	Series broadcast on Qatar Television	
2020	العمر مرة (Alomr Mara)	Series broadcast on Qatar Television	
