= Munaf =

Munaf may refer to:

- Munaf Patel, Indian cricket player
- Mohammad Munaf, Iraqi-American terror suspect
- Mohammad Munaf (cricketer), Pakistani cricket player
- Manaf (deity) (also Manaf), a pre-Islamic deity

== See also ==
- Manaf (disambiguation)
