= Khalid Hussain Asad =

Pakistani general

- Born: Khalid Hussain Asad; 1958 (age 67–68)
- Military career
- Allegiance: Pakistan
- Branch: Pakistan Army
- Service years: 1983-2018
- Rank: Major General
- Unit: Pakistan Army Medical Corps

Khalid Hussain Asad is a retired two-star general in Pakistan Army, who served as the DG Medical Services, Azad Kashmir (DGMS AK). He was promoted to the rank of Major General on 11 February 2014.
