= Khalid bin Omar bin Said al Marhoon =

Omani politician

Minister of Civil Service
- Appointed by: Sultanate of Oman
- Monarch: Qaboos bin Said al Said

Khalid bin Omar bin Said al Marhoon is an Omanis politician and governor of Muscat. He is the minister of civil service in the Sultanate of Oman.
