= Khalid Al-Dakhil =

Saudi Arabian journalist

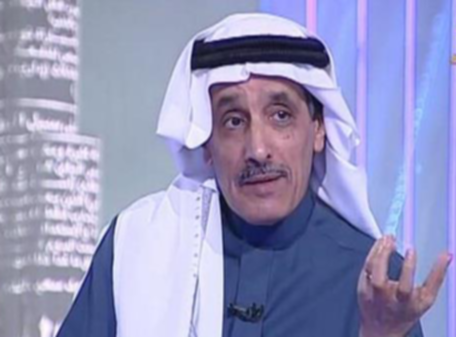
Dr Khalid Al-Dakhil

Dr. Khalid Al-Dakhil (Arabic: خالد الدخيل) is a Saudi Arabian assistant professor of political sociology at King Saud University in Saudi Arabia. He has been a columnist for London's Al-Hayat newspaper (صحيفة الحياة) and is now a columnist for the Al-Ittihad newspaper (صحيفة أبو ظبي). He is widely published in Arabic journals. He received his Ph.D. and M.A. from the University of California, Los Angeles.

During his four-month tenure at the Carnegie Endowment, his research and outreach focused on Saudi politics, history, and reform as well as the country's relations with the United States. His contribution augmented the Middle East Political Reform Initiative of Carnegie's Democracy and Rule of Law Project. He has also called for demphasizing Wahhabism in Saudi history, which he believes is given ahistorical weight. "We've written the state history improperly, which is why most Saudis don’t know the history of the Saudi state or the Arabian Peninsula, unfortunately".
