= Ras Munif =

Coordinates: 32°22′51″N 35°48′22″E

Ras Munif رأس منيف
- Town
- Location in Jordan
- Country: Jordan
- Governorate: Ajloun Governorate

Population
  - Total: 2,047 (2,015)
- Time zone: UTC + 2

Ras Munif (Arabic: رأس منيف) is a town located in the Gilead hills of Northern Jordan in the Ajloun Governorate. The town lies in an area with some of the most fertile land in the Kingdom and due to that it has a population of mainly farmers. Ras Munif has some ruins of old houses that are approximately 200 years old in its western side. The town had a population of about 2047 residents according to the last census in 2015.

== Climate ==
The region experiences extremely cold winters, characterized by heavy rainfall and significant snowfall. Temperatures can sometimes drop to –15 °C or lower, making Al-Qa’idah the coldest area in the Ajloun Mountains. It is also among the regions in Jordan—and within the Ajloun area specifically—that most frequently witness substantial snow accumulation. In contrast, the summer climate is mild and pleasant, often accompanied by fog and light drizzle. The entire Ajloun region is considered a favored summer resort due to its moderate weather and natural beauty.
