= Khalid Amin =

Moroccan writer

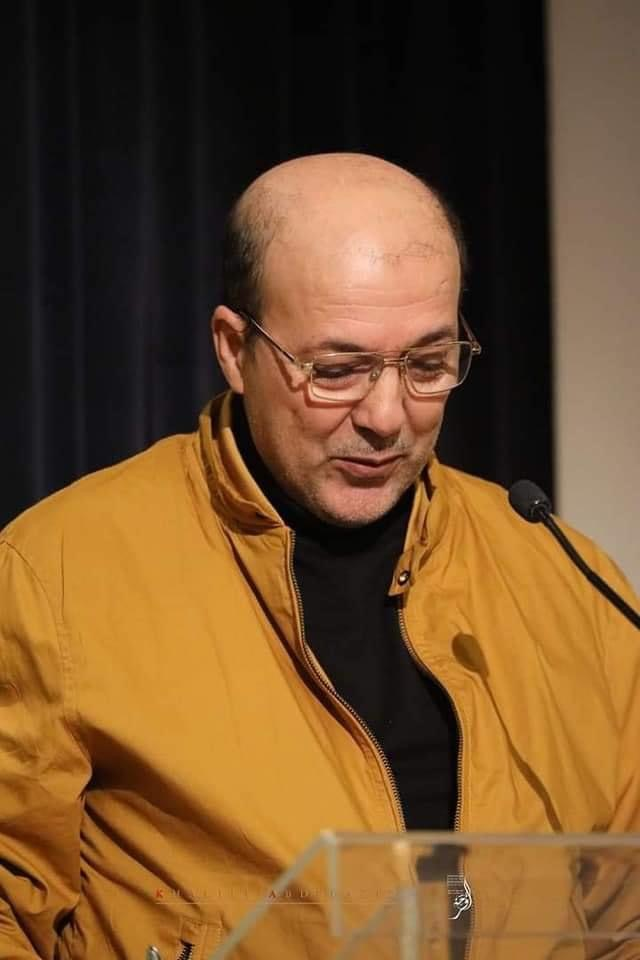
- Born: 15-02-1966
- Occupations: Collage professor, writer, researcher

Khalid Amin (Arabic: خالد أمين; born 15 February 1966) is a Moroccan writer, academic and researcher. He is a professor of Higher Education at the Faculty of Arts and Human Sciences in Tetouan, belonging to Abdelmalek Essaâdi University. He specializes in English literature, theater, performance, and cultural studies. He is the founder and president of the International Center for Performance Studies in Tangier and a member of the advisory board of the International Institute for the Interweaving of Performance Cultures at the University of Berlin. His work also integrates with the voices of Post-Colonial Studies.

== His path ==
He was born in Tetouan on February 15, 1966, and settled in Tangiers. After obtaining his bachelor's degree from Zainab Al-Nafzweyya High School in Tangiers, he studied at the English Language Department at the Faculty of Arts and Humanities in Tétouan. Amin traveled to England to obtain a master's degree from the University of Essex.

After obtaining his master's degree from the University of Essex in modern literature, he returned to Morocco and worked as a professor of higher education in 1993. Khalid Amin was keen to study the arts of Moroccan and Arab Performance and to introduce it to the whole world, based on the idea that a performance is human practice, not confined to a specific culture. In 2000, he discussed his doctoral thesis in comparative literature in which he studied Shakespeare in Moroccan Theater under the joint supervision of England and Morocco.

Khalid Amin founded the International Center for Performance Studies, which was initially linked to the Research Group in Theater and Drama at the Faculty of Arts in Tetouan. He established partnerships with Moroccan and international research and performance centers, including the University of London and the "International Research Center for the Interweaving of Performance Cultures" at the University of Berlin, founded by German theater scholar Erika Fischer Lichte.

== Works ==
=== individual works ===
- What is after Brecht (Arabic title: Ma ba'd Byrshat), Al-Sindi Publications, Meknes, 1996.
- Moroccan Theater Between East and West-in English (Arabic title: Almasrah Al-Magribi Bain Manshoorat Al-Sinde), Book Club Publications, Faculty of Arts, Tetouan, 2000.
- Theatrical art and the Myth of Origin (Arabic title: Al-Fan Al-Masrahe wa is'toraat Al-Asil), publications of the Faculty of Arts, Tetouan, 2002, publications of the International Center for Performance Studies.
- Spaces of Silence (Arabic title: Masahat Al-samit) - The Seduction of Al-Mabaineyya in Our Theatrical Imaginary.Publications of the Moroccan Writers Union, Rabat, 2004.
- Theater and Performance Studies (Arabic: Al-Masrah wa Dirasat Al-Farjah), Publications of the International Center for the Studies of Performance, 2012.
- Theater and Fugitive Identities (Arabic title: Al-Masrah wa Al-Hiwayat Al-Hariba), Publications of the International Center for the Studies of Performance, 2019.
- Dancing on the Hyphen. Tetouan, 2020.

== Translated works ==
Erika Fischer Lichte, From the Theater of Acculturation to the Interweaving of Performance Cultures. Publications of the International Center for Performance Studies, 2015.

Patrice Bavis, Dramaturgy and Beyond Dramaturgy, co-translated with Said Karimi. Publications of the International Center for the Performance Studies, 2014.

=== Co-authored works ===
- The Theater and its Bets (Arabic title: Al-Masrah Wa Rihanati'h), Khaled Amin and Hassan Al-Manai'i, Publications of the International Center for the Performance Studies, 2012.
- Post-Drama Theatre (Arabic title: Masrah Ma Baed Al-Drama), Kristel Weiler, Hassan Al-Manai, Khaled Amin and Mohamed Seif, Publications of the International Center for the Performance Studies, 2012.
- Theaters of Morocco, Algeria, and Tunisia: Traditions of Phrasing in the Big Maghreb, Khaled Amin and Marvin Carlson, Palgrave Macmillan: London/New York, 2012.
- Dramaturgy: From Theatrical Work to the Spectator, Mohamed Seif / Khaled Amin, Tangiers, Publications of the International Center for Performance Studies, 2014.

=== Edited books ===
- Interfacing between Theatre and Anthropology, Publications of the Research Group in Theatre and Drama belonging to Abdul Malik Al-Saadi University, 2002.
- Improvised Discourse in Theatre, Discourse and Components, Publications of the Research Group in Theater and Drama belonging to Abdelmalek El-Saadi University, Tetouan, 2003.
- Moroccan Theater between Theorizing and Professionalism, publications of the Research Group in Theater and Drama belonging to Abdelmalek Saadi University, Tetouan, 2004.
- Margins of Theories and Theories of Margins, Conference Proceedings, Abdelmalek Essaadi University, Faculty of Humanities, Tetouan 2003.
- Writing Tangier, Conference Proceedings, Abdelmalek Essaadi University, Tetouan 2005.
- Voices of Tangier, Conference Proceedings, Abdelmalek Essadi University, Tetouan 2006.
- Performance and Cultural Diversity, Publications of the International Center for Performance Studies, 2010
- Theater and Media, Publications of the International Center for Performance Studies, 2013
- Performance Transformations / Transformations of Performance, Publications of the International Center for Performance Studies, 2013.
- A Performance and the Public Sphere, Publications of the International Center for Performance Studies, 2014.
