= Khalid Al-Shehhi =

Emirati association football player (born 1997)

Khalid Al-Shehhi خالد الشحي
Personal information
- Full name: Khalid Mohamed Obaid Al-Shehhi
- Date of birth: 17 July 1997 (age 29)
- Place of birth: Emirates
- Height: 1.74 m (5 ft 9 in)
- Position: Midfielder

Youth career
- Ittihad Kalba

Senior career*
Years	Team	Apps	(Gls)
2015–2023	Ittihad Kalba	25	(0)
2021	→ Al-Bataeh (loan)		
- * Club domestic league appearances and goals

Khalid Al-Shehhi (Arabic:خالد الشحي) (born 17 July 1997) is an Emirati footballer who plays as a midfielder.

== Career ==
Al-Shehhi started his career at Ittihad Kalba and is a product of the Ittihad Kalba's youth system. On 8 May 2015, Al-Shehhi made his professional debut for Ittihad Kalba against Emirates Club in the Pro League, replacing Said Fettah . landed with Ittihad Kalba from the UAE Pro League to the UAE First Division League in 2014-15 season. ended up with Ittihad Kalba from the First Division League to the Pro League in the 2015-16 season. landed again with Ittihad Kalba from the Pro League to the First Division League in 2016-17 season. ended up with Ittihad Kalba from the First Division League to the Pro League in the 2017-18 season.
