= Khalid Lebhij =

Moroccan footballer

Personal information
- Date of birth: 27 December 1985 (age 40)
- Place of birth: Oujda, Morocco
- Height: 1.75 m (5 ft 9 in)
- Positions: Attacking midfielder; left winger

Team information
- Current team: Hassania Agadir
- Number: 10

Senior career*
Years	Team	Apps	(Gls)
2005–2009	Mouloudia Club d'Oujda	76	(5)
2009–2011	Wydad Casablanca	31	(3)
2011–2012	FUS	11	(1)
2012–2013	Hassania Agadir	28	(4)

International career^{‡}
2006	Morocco U20	7	(0)
2008–	Morocco U23	8	(0)
2008	Morocco	1	(0)
- * Club domestic league appearances and goals ‡ National team caps and goals as of 1 October 2010

Khalid Lebhij (Arabic: خالد لبیج – born 27 December 1985, Oujda) is a Moroccan footballer who plays as a midfielder.

== Honors ==
=== Club ===
- Wydad Casablanca
  - Moroccan League: 2009-10
