= Khalid El-Aabidi =

Moroccan weightlifter (born 1995)

Personal information
- Nationality: Moroccan
- Born: 14 September 1995 (age 30)
- Height: 1.78 m (5 ft 10 in)
- Weight: 85 kg (187 lb)

Sport
- Country: Morocco
- Sport: Weightlifting

Khalid El-Aabidi (born 14 September 1995) is a Moroccan Olympic weightlifter. He represented his country at the 2016 Summer Olympics.
