= Khalid Al Maskati =

Bahraini businessman and politician

- Born: January 23, 1959 (age 67)
- Occupations: Businessman and politician

Khalid Al Maskati (Arabic: خالد المسقطي, January 23, 1959) is a Bahraini businessman and politician. He became a member of the Shura Council in 2002.

== Career ==
Al Maskati was born in Manama on January 23, 1959. He went to Lebanon in 1974 to study at the American University of Beirut but left it shortly when the Lebanese Civil War started. He traveled to the United States and obtained his Bachelor of Business Administration with a concentration in Industrial Management from Texas Tech University, graduating in 1979 with honors.

He entered the private sector, becoming the vice-chairman of the Board of Directors of Maskati Brothers & Company (MBCO). In addition, he has served on the boards of directors of the following companies:

- Hussein Mahdi Al Maskati & Sons
- Maskati Commercial Services
- Bahrain Training Institute
- Royal Humanitarian Foundation
- Trafco
- Bahrain Water Plant
- Central Bank of Bahrain
- Gulf Union Insurance & Reinsurance Company

He also served as a local managing director for United Paper Industries. He was first appointed to the Shura Council in 1996, serving until 2000 but returning in 2002.

== Awards ==
- Isa Award
