= Khalid Shahmah =

- Military career
- Allegiance: Libyan Arab Jamahiriya (until 2011); Libya (2011-)
- Branch: (Libya) National Liberation Army
- Rank: Major-General
- Conflicts: 2011 Libyan civil war * First Battle of Zawiya

Major-General Khalid Shahmah is a senior Libyan military officer. Though once under the employ of Muammar Gaddafi's government, he is now loyal to the National Transitional Council of Libya. After the use of Gaddafi's forces to repress a series of protests and the subsequent uprising beginning on 15 February 2011, on 10 March 2011 it was reported by Libya's state news that Major-General Khalid Shahmah had defected. Shahmah's defection was a contributing factor in a change of strategy for Gaddafi's remaining loyal forces during the 2011 Libyan civil war.

Libya's state-controlled television station reported in an "urgent" on-screen cation that Major-General Khalid Shahmah, switched sides to join the rebels in the city of Zawiya, one of two fiercely contested western cities that were strongholds of the opposition at the time of Shahmah's defection. Coinciding with the defection, Western military analysts, like the International Institute for Strategic Studies based in London, determined that Colonel Gaddafi had begun curbing the use of his ground troops because his commanders feared mass defections.
