= Khalid Ghani Chaudhry =

Pakistani politician

Member of the Provincial Assembly of the Punjab
- In office 29 May 2013 – 31 May 2018

Personal details
- Born: 9 December 1958 (age 67) Shorkot
- Party: Pakistan Muslim League (Nawaz)

Khalid Ghani Chaudhry is a Pakistani politician who was a Member of the Provincial Assembly of the Punjab, from May 2013 to May 2018.

== Early life and education ==
He was born on 9 December 1958 in Shorkot.

He has a degree of Bachelor of Arts and a degree of Bachelor of Laws which he obtained in 1984 from Punjab University Law College.

== Political career ==
He was elected to the Provincial Assembly of the Punjab as a candidate of Pakistan Muslim League (Nawaz) from Constituency PP-80 (Jhang-VIII) in the 2013 Pakistani general election.
