= Khalidiyah Mall =

- Location: Abu Dhabi, United Arab Emirates
- Coordinates: 24.47°N 54.3515°E
- Opened: January 2007
- Num. of stores: 160
- Floor area: 86,000 m^{2} (930,000 sq ft)
- Floors: 3

Khalidiyah Mall is a shopping mall in Abu Dhabi, the capital of the United Arab Emirates, in the densely populated residential area of Al Khalidiyah. It houses 160 stores including Lulu Hypermarket and has an area of 86,000 sq m (about 800,000 square feet). The mall was opened in January 2007 and is run by Lulu Group International.

== History ==
EMKE Group announced plans for the 800,000 sq ft (74,000 m^{2}) mall in May 2004, which was expected to cost Dh200 million. In July 2004, EMKE Group received bids from eight companies for the construction of the mall, and by September, all major contracts had been awarded, development had begun and negotiations were taking place with retailers. The development contract was awarded to the Belbadi Contracting Company, based in Abu Dhabi. Lt Gen Shaikh Mohammad Bin Zayed Al Nahyan, Abu Dhabi Deputy Crown Prince and Chief of Staff of the UAE Armed Forces, unveiled the logo for the development in October, saying "Such ambitious mega projects will certainly boost the global economic profile of Abu Dhabi."

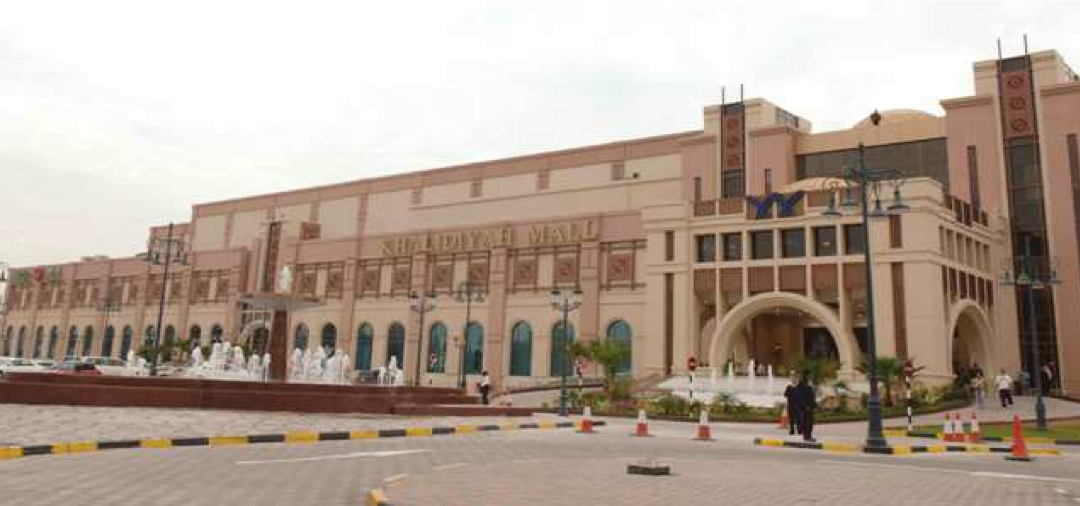
Khalidiyah Mall

The mall was expected to be completed in July 2006 and have three floors with room for 600 cars in semi-basement parking and parking for 2,500 cars in total, and have a hypermarket, cinemas and food court in addition to a variety of stores.
