= Aisha Khalid =

Pakistani contemporary visual artist

- Born: 1972 (age 53–54); Lahore, Pakistan
- Known for: Visual art, Miniature painting
- Website: aishakhalid.com

Aisha Khalid (born 1972 in Faisalabad, Pakistan) is a female contemporary visual artist, working with miniature painting, textiles, video and site specific installations in architectural spaces.

Khalid is one of a generation of artists from Pakistan who have transformed the tradition of miniature painting into an internationally celebrated form of contemporary art. In recent years, Khalid’s practice has extended to significantly larger paintings, murals and installations. She is a member of what has come to be called the Pakistani 'neo-miniature' school.

== Biography ==
Khalid graduated from the National College of Arts, Lahore in 1993 and completed her post-graduate degree in Fine Art from Rijksakademie, Amsterdam in 2003. Khalid was schooled in classical miniature painting and has become a leading figure in developing the contemporary miniature.

She has described her two-year fellowship at the Rijksakademie as a real learning experience, due to the culture shocks she encountered. She has described how the reaction from audiences in Amsterdam to her miniatures differed compared to reactions in Pakistan:

My miniatures were considered beautiful and exotic but beyond that the viewers could not read anything significant in them. They would ask me, is it about religion, ethnicity or typical oriental traditions? It was surprising to discover the difference in perception, in Pakistan my miniature was labeled as unconventional and modern while western audiences considered them archaic.

As a result, her experience in Amsterdam led her to change her style and adopt more contemporary mediums to make her work more accessible to her hosts.

== Work ==
Khalid works with paintings, murals, video, installations, and textile works. She was initially trained as a traditional miniaturist, and is known for reviving old techniques in contemporary ways.

=== Themes ===
Many of Khalid's works deal with the theme of gender. Her work has been described as having a 'feminine sensibility', coming partly from references to traditionally feminine crafts such as textiles and needlework. This comes both from her use of textiles in her work, but also from her focus on repeated geometric patterns, taken from traditional Islamic patterns, combined with floral motifs.

In keeping with the theme of gender, she has also made repeated use of the theme of the covered or uncovered female figure, using motifs such as curtains, burqas, and flowers. This theme took on a new dimension after her fellowship at the Rijksakademie in Amsterdam, where she encountered familiar patterns of male dominance and female submissiveness, but with new dimensions. Her flower and curtain symbols took on new meanings: the red-light district, for example, had different types of curtains, drawn to indicate the conduct of business.

After 9/11, a new political dimension appeared in her work. Conversation, for example, is a video installation made during Khalid's time at the Rijksakademie. The work was about her response to the violence inflicted on Afghanistan in the name of counter-terrorism. Throughout the work, a rose is slowly embroidered by a brown-skinned hand, while at the same time another rose is unpicked, removed, and subsequently erased by a white hand using a needle.

== Awards ==
Khalid received the Alice Award (artist book category) in 2012, and was a finalist for the Jameel Art Prize in 2011, winning the People’s Choice Award in 2011. She is among a handful of Pakistani artists who have had solo shows of their work, including 'Two worlds as one' Statens Museum for Kunst, Copenhagen (2016); Garden of ideas, Aga Khan Museum, Toronto (2014); Larger Than Life, Whitworth Art Gallery, United Kingdom (2012); Larger Than Life, Corvi-Mora, London (2012); Pattern to Follow, Chawkandi Art, Karachi (2010); Conversations, Pump House Gallery, London (2008). She participated at the 2009 Venice Biennale, the 2011 Sharjah Biennial and 2013 Moscow Biennale.

== Books and Articles ==
- Book: Aisha Khalid: The Divine is in the Detail (artist monograph, catalog), Gallery Isabelle van den Eynde, Dubai, 2013
- Book: Aisha Khalid: Larger than Life (artist monograph, catalog), Whitworth Art Gallery, The University of Manchester, Manchester, 2012
- Book: Aisha Khalid: Pattern to Follow (artist monograph, catalog), Gandhara-art, Hong Kong, 2010
- Book: Aisha Khalid: Name, Class, Subject (artist book, artist monograph) Raking Leaves, Colombo, 2009
- Book: Portraits & Vortexes: Aisha Khalid (artist monograph, catalog), Gandhara-art, Hong Kong, 2007
- Book: Aisha Khalid: Tales Carried by the Breath (artist monograph, catalog), Anant Art Gallery, New Delhi, 2006
- Book: Aisha Khalid 2001-2002 (artist monograph), 2002
- Book: The Eye Still Seeks: Pakistani Contemporary Art (anthology) Penguin Books India, 2015
- Book: Colour and Line: The Naqvi Collection (catalog) 2015
- Book: Art and Polemic in Pakistan: Cultural Politics and Tradition in Contemporary Miniature Painting (monograph) Tauris Academic Studies, London, 2010
- Book: Journeys of the Spirit: Pakistan Art in the New Millennium (monograph) FOMMA, Karachi, 2008
- Book: Memory, Metaphor, Mutations: Contemporary Art of India and Pakistan (monograph) Oxford University Press, New Delhi, 2007
- Book: Vasl 2005-2006 (anthology) Vasl International Artists’ Workshop, Karachi, 2006
- Book: Asian Art Newspaper (Vol. 8, Issue 3; Jan 2005) (magazine), Asian Art Newspaper, London, 2005
- Book: Art Tomorrow (monograph) Marc Parent/Terrail, Paris, 2002
- Book: Unveiling the Visible: Lives and Works of Women Artists of Pakistan (monograph), Sang-e-Meel Publication, Lahore, 2001
- Article: "Reinventing Tradition" by Rachel Duffell, Kee Magazine, 2010
- Article: "Reading Through the Lense of the Political: Contemporary Art in Pakistan", Asia Art Archive, Sep 2009
- Article: Pakistan's Contemporary Painting Workshop, HK, Quintessentially: Insider, 2007
