= Khalid Almoayed =

Bahraini politician

Member of Consultative Council
- In office 2006–2010

Personal details
- Occupation: Business and politics

Khalid Almoayed (Arabic: خالد المؤيد) is a Bahraini businessman and politician.

== Career ==
Almoayed was born in Muharraq. He holds a Bachelor's degree in Civil Engineering at the University of Birmingham in the United Kingdom. He chairs the board of directors of the following companies:

- Khalid Almoayed & Sons
- Abdulrahman Khalil Almoayed Group
- ACE Almoayed Engineering Consultants
- Bahrain Fresh Fruits Company
- Manama Travel Centre and Manama Tours
- iMachines
- At Computers
- Mediaagenic Advertising Company
- Wells Arabia
- Infusion Hospitals

He also serves on the board of Trafco.

He was appointed to the Consultative Council, on which he served from 2006 to 2010. He was elected president of the Bahrain Chamber of Commerce and Industry 2014.
