= Khalid Jamil (Commodore) =

Khalid Jamil was a Pakistani naval officer and politician who served as the vice chief of the naval staff from 1953 to 1954 and retired from the Pakistan Navy with the rank of commodore. He also served as acting commander-in-chief of the Pakistan Navy until 1956, when he was demoted and court-martialed for theft from navy barracks.

== Life ==
Jamil was born in Dadayun and later earned honours in Persian from Lucknow University. He joined the Royal Indian Navy Volunteer Reserve in 1937 and received a permanent commission in 1939. He migrated to Pakistan with his wife and three children after the creation of Pakistan.

During the presidency of Ayub Khan, Jamil joined the Convention Muslim League and was a member of the 3rd and 4th National Assemblies of Pakistan. In the same period, he became an industrialist and founded the first plastic factory in Pakistan.
