= Khalid Al-Hail =

Qatari businessman

President of the Qatar National Democratic Party (QNDP)

Personal details
- Occupation: Business and politics

Khalid Al-Hail is a Qatari businessman based in London and Monaco. He is the founder and president of the Qatar National Democratic Party (QNDP), which advocates for a constitutional monarchy in Qatar.

A former associate of Qatar's ex-prime minister, Hamid bin Jassim, Al-Hail supports a "bloodless coup." As a result of his political activity, Al-Hail was jailed and tortured in Qatar. He moved to London in February 2015. He is often referred to in press reports as the leader of the Qatari National Democratic Party.

== Career ==
In 2010, Al-Hail helped form the Qatari Youth Rescue Movement. In 2014, Al Hail said membership had increased to 30,000. That same year, Al-Hail reported having more than 9,000 documents demonstrating the corruption of the Qatari officials. Al-Hail supports Royal Family of Qatar and fight corruption in the country.

Al-Hail organized and financed the Qatar, Global Security and Stability Conference, held in London on September 14, 2017. Foreign policy experts from the United States, United Kingdom and the Gulf discussed Qatar's support of terrorism, human rights abuses and its strained relationship with its Gulf neighbors. Speakers included Lord Paddy Ashdown, Ambassador Bill Richardson, Iain Duncan Smith, Member of Parliament Daniel Kawczynski and General Chuck Wald, Brigadier General Shlomo Brom.

== Personal life ==
Al-Hail is a distant relative of Sheikha Mouza Bint Nassir, whose son, Tamim bin Hamad Al Thani, is the current emir of Qatar.
