= Khalid (disambiguation) =

Khalid is a common Arabic masculine given name in many Arab and Asian countries, which means "eternal, everlasting, immortal".

Khalid may also refer to:

- Khalid (American singer) (born 1998), American R&B singer and songwriter
- Khalid (Bangladeshi singer) (1963/1964–2024), Bangladeshi singer
- Khalid (writer), Indian author
- Khalid, a fictional character portrayed by Saif Ali Khan in the 2009 Indian film Kurbaan
- Khalid, a video game character from Baldur's Gate
- Khalid ibn al-Walid, a seventh century military leader
- Bani Khalid, an Arab tribal confederation of eastern and central Arabia
- Al-Khalid tank, a Pakistani tank
- Captain Khalid Rahmani, fictional R&AW agent in the 2019 Indian film War, portrayed by Tiger Shroff and Ayaan Zubair Rahmani

== See also ==
- Khaled (disambiguation)
