= Khalid Bin Vilayat =

Pakistani politician

Member of the Provincial Assembly of Sindh
- In office 29 May 2013 – 28 May 2018

Personal details
- Born: 16 July 1967 (age 58) Karachi, Sindh, Pakistan
- Party: MQM-P (2023-present)
- Other political affiliations: PSP (2016-2023); MQM-L (2013-2016)

Khalid Bin Vilayat is a Pakistani politician who had been a Member of the Provincial Assembly of Sindh, from May 2013 to May 2018.

== Early life and education ==
He was born on 16 July 1967 in Karachi.

He has a degree of Bachelors in Commerce, a degree of Master of Arts in political science and a degree of Bachelor of Laws, all from Karachi University.

== Political career ==
He was elected to the Provincial Assembly of Sindh as a candidate of MQM-L from Constituency PS-105 KARACHI-XVII in the 2013 Pakistani general election. In August 2016, he quit MQM-L to join PSP.
