= Khalid Abu Ali =

Saudi journalist

Khalid bin Abdullah bin Abdul Rahman Bou Ali
- Born: 13 November 1966 (age 59)
- Education: King Faisal University
- Occupations: journalist, editor and chief executive officer of the Eastern Printing and Media Foundation.

Khalid bin Abdullah bin Abd Al Rahman Bu Ali (Arabic: خالد بن عبدالله بن عبد الرحمن بو علي) (13 November 1966) a Saudi journalist, editor of Al Sharq since 2013 and a chief executive officer of the Eastern Printing and Media Foundation. He is also a member of the Board of Directors of the Saudi Journalists Authority.

== Education ==
Bu Ali studied at King Faisal University in Al-Ahsa and majored in project management. He obtained his bachelor's degree in 1990. He also attended a number of training courses in journalism and media, including specialized journalism courses at Saudi Research and Publishing Company in London and the Head Centre in Jeddah in 1991/1992. He received practical training in Middle Eastern and Morning papers.

== Career ==
Bu Ali began his career in 1987 as a correspondent for a number of Saudi and Gulf publications until 1989, when he joined Saudi Research and Publishing Company, where he worked as an editor for the Middle East newspaper and "Noon" newspaper during the second Gulf War. He later became an official to liberate the Middle East in the Eastern Region, after which he joined the foundation team of the Sabah Newspaper, "Noon". Year later, he started to work at Al-Estiya newspaper which was launched by the Saudi Research and Publishing Company. He was appointed Director of Economic Editorial in 2003 and Director of the Office of Saudi Research and Publishing Company in the Eastern Region until 2007. He also established the Saudi Public Relations Department in Bahrain's Eastern Region and the Customer Relations Department. In2007, he joined the Eastern Press and Media Foundation as supervisor and Director-General of the Orient Newspaper Launch Project, and was appointed Editor-in-Chief in 2013.

== Notable works ==
Khalid Bu Ali worked on press coverage of a number of high-profile events such as the Second Gulf War coverage in the Middle East and Noon newspapers, the 1996 news bombings of the Middle East, Economic and Arab News newspapers, America's war in Iraq in 2003 for the economic newspaper, and terrorist operations in the eastern region of economic, eastern and magazine newspapers.

=== Works ===
Sources:

- Khalid Bu Ali has a number of compositions.
- Eastern in the heart of the King, Eastern in the heart of Sultan.
- Sands of gold in his first and second parts, and Abdullah Fuad.
- Challenge and Insistence, Abdul Aziz Kanu.
- The rich experience.

== Memberships ==
=== Current memberships ===
Member of the board of directors of the Saudi Journalists Authority, the board of directors of the Gulf Press Union and the General Assembly of the Arab Distributors' Union. Commission on Investment and Resource Development of the Journalists' Commission, founder and member of the Eastern Orphans Association.

=== Previous memberships ===
Member of the Proactive Media Committee of the Twentieth Summit, member of the Municipal Council of the Eastern Region, first session, The Municipal Council of the Eastern Region, second session, and the Investment Committee of the Municipal Council of the Eastern Region The board of directors of the National Distribution Company and the executive committee of the National Distribution Company, Saudi Media and Communication Association, member of the Saudi-French Business Council, member of the Saudi-Bahraini Business Council Arab Distributors' Union, Arab Association for Culture, Thought and Literature; Saudi Cancer Care Charity and Disabled People's Association Media Committee in the Eastern Region.
