= Khalid Shatta =

Norwegian–Sudanese contemporary visual artist

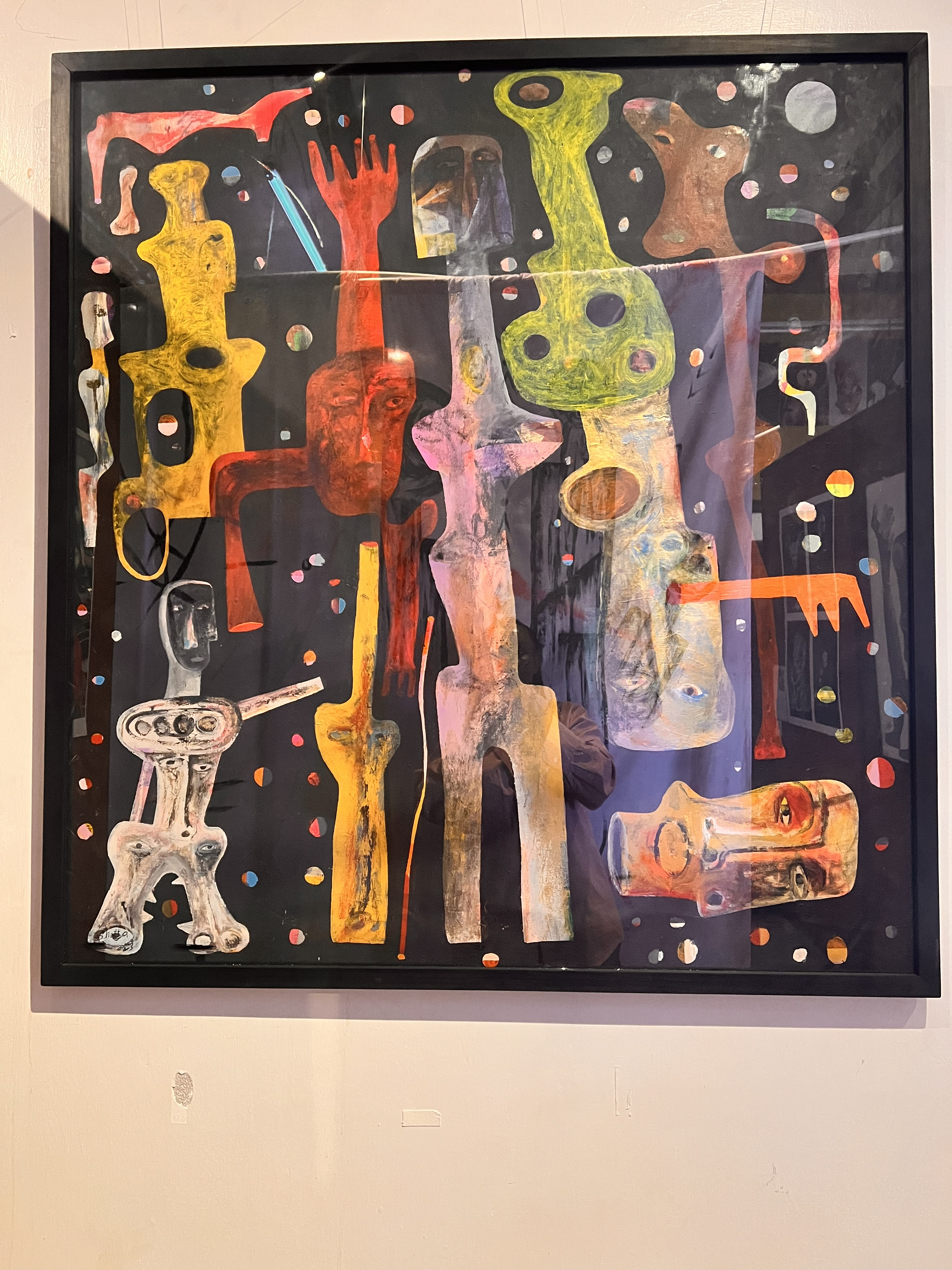
Candy War - 2023

Khalid Shatta (born 1989, Nuba Mountains, Sudan) is a Norwegian–Sudanese contemporary visual artist whose work explores the intimate connection between humans and nature. He employs geometric abstraction and incorporates ancient Kemetic and Cushitic symbols from the historical Nile valley civilizations to challenge dominant media narratives about Sudan and to celebrate indigenous systems of knowledge.

== Early life and education ==
Shatta was born in 1989 in the Nuba Mountains of South Kordofan, more than 500 km southwest of Khartoum. Due to ongoing conflict in the region, he relocated to Khartoum Bahri, the northern part of Sudan's tri-city capital, early in his life. He developed an early interest in drawing and photography.

Shatta attended the Sudan University of Science and Technology's Faculty of Fine and Applied Arts, becoming the first member of his family to attend university. He was unable to complete his studies due to growing political strikes in Sudan.

One of his first projects involved photographing life in the Nuba Mountains, where he became interested in the intimate connections between humans and nature, as well as children's innocence and childhood despite difficult circumstances. In Sudan, he worked with organizations such as Save the Children, youth forums, and initiatives to integrate child soldiers and South Sudanese refugees.

== Career ==
With the support of a peer, Shatta's work was nominated for the 2012 EFA Global Monitoring Report art contest, a UNESCO competition, which he won and earned a short residency in Paris. As the situation in Sudan became increasingly difficult, he migrated to Norway at the end of 2011, seeking asylum. He has been living in Norway since, moving between cities before settling in Oslo in 2018 after being accepted to Prosjektskolen kunstskole. Shatta now considers Norway his "home" after spending 13 years in the country.

Shatta works primarily in painting and photography. His work is inspired by modernist painters, including Hussein Gamaan, Kerry James Marshall, Jean-Michel Basquiat, and Paul Klee, as well as photographers such as Malick Sidibé, Seydou Keïta, and Gordon Parks. He draws significant inspiration from ancient Sudanese history and the art of the Nile valley civilizations.

== Themes and style ==
Shatta's work employs geometric abstraction and incorporates ancient Kemetic and Cushitic symbols from the historical kingdoms of the Nile valley civilizations. His series Migration of the Soul explores the sensation of being out of place and feeling disconnected from one's own body and existence. He celebrates indigenous systems of knowledge and belonging, urging audiences to consider larger, unifying concepts that can create common ground for connection.

== Selected exhibitions and projects ==
- 2023: Migration of the Soul: A Conversation with Visual Artist Khalid Shatta, INSPIRE Seminar Series, PRIO Centre on Culture, Conflict and Coexistence
- 2024: Liberation and Imagination? About art, Congo, Haiti, and Sudan, Munch Museum, Oslo
- 2025: Gods in Action, Nairobi
- 2026: Inside Archives: Interventions on Leni Riefenstahl's Nuba Work
