= Khalid Ali Matar =

Emirati association football player (born 1989)

Khalid Ali Matar خالد علي مطر
Personal information
- Full name: Khalid Ali Matar Al-Baloushi
- Date of birth: 26 July 1989 (age 37)
- Place of birth: Emirates
- Height: 1.71 m (5 ft 7 in)
- Position: Left-back

Youth career
- 2006–2011: Al-Nasr

Senior career*
Years	Team	Apps	(Gls)
2011–2014	Al-Nasr		
2014–2020	Hatta		
2020	→ Masfout (loan)		
2020–2022	Al Dhaid		
- * Club domestic league appearances and goals

Khalid Ali Matar (Arabic: خالد علي مطر) (born 26 July 1989) is an Emirati footballer. He currently plays as a left back.

== Career ==
Khalid Ali started his career at Al-Nasr and is a product of the Al-Nasr's youth system, and after then played for Hatta, Masfout, and Al Dhaid.
