= Khalid Mohamed Al Jaber =

Long-distance motorcycle rider

- خالد محمد الجابر
- Born: Qatar
- Education: Masters in Innovative Technology
- Honours: First Arab Biker for crossing the longest road from pole to pole

Khalid Mohamed Al Jaber (خالد محمد الجابر) is a record holder Qatari biker and traveler who travels to spread messages and create awareness about specific subjects. In 2017, he traveled 21,000 km at the silk route, from London to Beijing, promoting the work of charitable health projects that work for children without limbs. He traveled 43,000 km from Alaska to Argentina in 2018, spreading the idea of traveling and exploring among young people. The trip was supported by the Ministry of Culture and Sports of Qatar. The last trip was the road to Tasili in Algeria promoting the Algerian tourism destination in 2021 that was supported by the Ministry of tourism and handicrafts of Algeria.

== Early life ==
Khalid Mohamed Al Jaber's passion for motorcycles began at an early age of 8. He holds a Bachelor’s degree in Network Engineering and a master's degree in Innovative Technology (Computer Crime). He is a computer network engineer and also works in film production. He obtained his driver's license in 2010 and started with a classic bike. Al Jaber's first long distance travel was of 800 km which he covered by circling Qatar.

== Awards and recognition ==
- First Arab Biker for crossing the longest road from pole to pole
