= Khalid Fared (footballer) =

Qatari footballer (born 1987)

Personal information
- Full name: Khalid Fared Fairouz Almass Alabdullah
- Date of birth: 7 January 1987 (age 39)
- Place of birth: Qatar
- Height: 1.77 m (5 ft 10 in)
- Position: Defender

Youth career
- ASPIRE Sports Academy

Senior career*
Years	Team	Apps	(Gls)
2002–2010	Al-Arabi SC	47	(0)
2010–2015	→ Al Duhail SC (loan)	18	(1)
2015	→ Al-Shahania (loan)	10	(0)
2016–2017	→ Al-Sailiya SC (loan)	12	(7)
2017–2018	Mesaimeer SC	15	(0)

International career^{‡}
2010–	Qatar	2	(0)
- * Club domestic league appearances and goals as of 9 April 2012 ‡ National team caps and goals as of 15 November 2010

Khalid Fared Fairouz Almass Alabdullah (born 7 January 1987) is a Qatari former professional footballer who played is a defender. He formerly played for the Qatar national team.

== Career ==
Fared played for the youth teams of Al-Arabi SC. He achieved recognition by the national team coach, Bruno Metsu, for scoring decisive goals in the Sheikh Jassem Cup in 2010.

He previously played for Al-Arabi SC, Al Duhail SC, Al-Sailiya SC, Al-Shahania, and Mesaimeer SC. In 2024, he was elected as an administrator in the Al-Arabi SC.
