= Khalid Moultrie =

American actor

- Born: 1995 (age 29–30); Silver Spring, Maryland, U.S.
- Occupation: Actor

Khalid Moultrie (born in 1995) is an American actor best known as the voice of Traction Jackson on Sesame Street. He also appeared in the promo for the HBO original series The Wire as Young Omar.

== Career ==
Khalid Moultrie started modeling at the age of 18 months and acting at the age of four years. His acting, modeling, and music experiences include various professional projects. He has had prominent roles in the theatrical productions of Carousel at the Olney Theatre, as directed by Bill Pasquanti. Khalid also appeared as a chorister for the Washington National Opera at the John F. Kennedy Center for the Performing Arts in the Italian opera TOSCA, under General Director Plácido Domingo. Khalid has performed as a singer (solo) for the Suicide Prevention Action Network and an actor for the National Bar Association. Khalid attended Montgomery County Public Schools in Olney, Maryland.
