= Khalid bin Ali Al Khalifa =

Kingdom of Bahrain royal family member

Shaikh Khalid bin Ali Al Khalifa
- Education: Cairo University and University of Nottingham
- Occupations: State Prosecutor (2003–2004); Undersecretary of the Ministry of Justice (2004–2006); Minister of Justice and Islamic Affairs (since 2006); Head of the High Elections Committee
- Family: Al Khalifa

Shaikh Khalid bin Ali Al Khalifa is a member of the royal family of the Kingdom of Bahrain. Since 2006, he has been the minister of justice and Islamic affairs, president of the National Committee for International Humanitarian Law, a member of the board of directors of the Judicial Studies Institute of Bahrain, and head of the High Elections Committee.

== Education and professional career ==
He studied law and obtained a master's degree in public law and criminal sciences at Cairo University and a master's degree in public international law at the University of Nottingham, United Kingdom. He began working at the Ministry of Justice and Islamic Affairs in 1994 as a legal researcher in the field of international judicial cooperation. In 2003, when the Public Prosecution was established, he was appointed as its head. In 2004, he became the undersecretary of the Ministry of Justice, and in 2006 he was promoted to minister and reappointed to the same position in 2014 by King Hamad.

== Controversies in the High Elections Committee ==
=== Intervention in the elections ===
The minister of justice, Shaikh Khalid bin Ali Al Khalifa, is also the head of the High Elections Committee and, therefore, one of those responsible for the manipulation of the only elections held in the country: those of the Lower House.

Since the peaceful pro-democracy protests of 2011, repression against the political opposition has been increasing exponentially. In terms of political participation in state bodies, the individuals who can run have been limited. Thus, anyone who has been imprisoned cannot be a candidate—preventing the participation of the 4,000 people who have been prisoners of conscience in Bahrain since 2011—the major opposition figures are in prison, and opposition political societies have been banned.

In 2014, the Minister of Justice asked the courts for the temporary suspension of the two major opposition political societies, Al-Wefaq and Wa'ad, to prevent their participation in that year's elections. In 2016, he definitively dissolved Al-Wefaq in a process that was closed on the same day, and in 2017, with charges of "incitement to terrorist acts and violence to overthrow the political regime," he dissolved Wa'ad. For the 2018 elections, none of the major political societies could participate. However, to ensure, if possible, a Lower House more aligned with the Al Khalifa regime, electoral constituencies were organized in such a way that the majority Shia population and leftist and Sunni Islamist groups were underrepresented in the final results due to the proportions generated by the districts.

== Controversies as Minister of Justice and Islamic Affairs ==
=== Ministerial control over religious communities ===
Sunni Islam is the state religion. However, Bahrain allows the establishment of other religious communities as long as the Ministry of Justice and Islamic Affairs accepts them and has received a financial donation. For the construction of mosques, it is the Ministry of Justice that evaluates and consents to the construction. The clerics of the mosques are appointed by royal decree and remunerated by the government; they are also imposed with the sermons they must deliver.

In 2011, 30 Shia mosques were destroyed. The Ministry committed to their reconstruction, and by 2018 celebrated the repair of 27. However, the opposition group Al-Wefaq reported that 11 of the mosques had not been repaired, and several NGOs claimed that the Ministry had not approved the reconstruction of mosques even when there had been numerous requests from the community.

In 2016, the Ministry of Justice prohibited four clerics from exercising their functions and asked them to sign a commitment that they would deliver the sermons stipulated by the authorities. Only one of them agreed to sign the commitment and was able to resume his activity.

=== Involvement in the withdrawal of licenses of human rights lawyers ===
According to several human rights organizations, the Ministry of Justice, under the orders of Shaikh Khalid bin Ali Al Khalifa, follows a pattern of harassment against human rights defense lawyers. They are arbitrarily accused and barred from practicing law.

In 2019, the Public Prosecutor's Office accused Abdullah Hashim of sharing "fake news" on Twitter about government corruption and other social and political issues in Bahrain. He was detained for a week for interrogation and to obtain more information.

Al-Shamlawi is a lawyer and human rights defender who has represented figures like Sheikh Ali Salman, the imprisoned leader of the opposition party Al-Wefaq. He was convicted for two tweets in which he expressed critical opinions about religious practices related to Ashura and for sharing erroneous information on his social networks. For this last charge, he was accused two years after the publication and having been previously interviewed by the prosecution.

In 2020, pending a sentence, the Bahraini Lawyers Disciplinary Board prohibited al-Shamlawi from practicing law for one month at the request of the minister of justice. This board is composed of lawyers and judges appointed by the minister for two-year terms.

=== Involvement in the dissolution of political groups opposed to the government ===
For the 2014 elections, the Ministry of Justice asked the courts to suspend Al-Wefaq and Wa'ad for three months, thus preventing their participation.

==== Dissolution of Al-Wefaq ====
The largest opposition political group, Al-Wefaq, was suspended in 2016 after a court ruling requested by the minister of justice on the same day, accusing the group of promoting violence and terrorism. The authorities froze their accounts, blocked the website, and closed the offices. Two days later, the High Civil Court of Bahrain formally dissolved Al-Wefaq.

==== Dissolution of Wa'ad ====
The National Democratic Action Society, a secular group known as Wa'ad, was dissolved in May 2017 for its statements about the constitutional crisis that Bahrain was experiencing during the pro-democracy protests of 2011. It was dissolved by a court at the request of Shaikh Khalid bin Ali Al Khalifa, the minister of justice. In the same ruling, the association's funds were liquidated. The minister also filed a lawsuit against Wa'ad for violating the Law on Political Associations; supporting Bahrain's largest opposition party, Al-Wefaq; and for having elected Ebrahim Sharif, a political prisoner jailed in 2011, as a member of the association's Central Committee. Additionally, he accused Wa'ad of inciting and defending terrorism.

"The allegations made by the Minister of Justice against Wa'ad and its leaders are unfounded and absurd," said Lynn Maalouf, Director of Research at Amnesty International's Beirut Regional Office. "The only crime they have committed is exercising their right to freedom of expression and association."
