= Khalid Mahmood Rashid =

Khalid Mahmood Rashid is a Pakistani national who went missing in South Africa during November 2005, and was later discovered to have been extradited to Pakistan. The South African government only admitted to this in June 2006, and then only after being ordered to do so by the High Court in Pretoria. His lawyer, Zehir Omar, has raised concerns that South Africa was taking part in the United States' program of extraordinary rendition, and has also started a legal battle to force the Department of Home Affairs to release more information about his client's disappearance, even going so far as to petition the International Criminal Court to investigate the matter.

The South African Department of Home Affairs has responded by claiming that it was a simple deportation, and in line with international practices relating to illegal immigration. Aziz Pahad, Deputy Foreign Affairs Minister for South Africa, acknowledged the amount of publicity this case has generated, both locally and internationally, and admitted that many people were inclined to believe that South Africa endorsed the extraordinary rendition programme.
