= Khalid S. Al-Ageel =

Saudi politician

Khalid bin Saad Al-Ageel
- خالد بن سعد العقيل
- Occupation: Secretary General of the Higher Commission for Industrial Security in the Ministry of Interior of Saudi Arabia.

Khalid bin Saad Al-Ageel, (Arabic: خالد بن سعد العقيل) was the Secretary General of the Higher Commission for Industrial Security in the Ministry of Interior of Saudi Arabia.

He involved in planning, designing and implementing all strategies, policies and processes related to industrial security for National Infrastructure Facilities in Saudi Arabia. An expert in the field of industrial security, his research interests include innovations in industrial security and process engineering.

By order of the former Crown Prince Muhammad bin Nayef, he facilitated the organization and also participated in national conferences and other regional events that support and promote industrial security. These have included the International Conference and Exhibition for industrial security, in collaboration with IFSEC International, as well as participating regularly in events held regionally by ASIS International.

He also served as a board member of the King Abdullah City for Atomic and Renewable Energy.

== Education ==
- Ph.D. in Chemical and Process Engineering, University of Sheffield, 1999.
- M.Sc. in Chemical Engineering, University of Sheffield, 1995, specializing in the field of process safety and loss prevention.
- B.Sc. in Industrial Engineering, King Saud University, 1990.

== Publications ==
- Experimental and Modelling Studies of Compartment Jet Fire Suppression Using Water Spray.
- Mitigation of Compartment Jet Fire Using Water Spray.
