= Khalid al-Shaybani =

Egyptian poet and novelist

- Born: December 10, 1979 (age 46); Saudi Arabia
- Education: Helwan University
- Occupations: Poet, writer

Khalid Al-Shaybani is an Egyptian poet, novelist, and screenwriter born in December 1979. He studied media at the Faculty of Arts and specialized in journalism and worked in many Egyptian and Arabic newspapers and magazines, and later on he devoted himself to literary and artistic writings.

- Member of the Egyptian Writers Union, member of the International Association of Authors, Composers and Publishers in France, and a member of the Egyptian Authors Association.
- One of his most famous poems is "The Spokesman for Love", which achieved an awakening in classical poetry and brought back followers from all over the Arab world after a long period of hiatus.
- He has received many local and international awards, mentioned in detail in the Awards and Honors section.
- He has written many popular commercials and recently directed one of the ads he had written.
- He wrote the poem "Anwar al-Burdah" in praise and love of Mohammad, following the footsteps of the poem Al-Burdah by Imam Al-Busiri, in which the number of verses in ‘Anwar al-Burdah’ exceeded those of Al-Burdah and Nahj Al-Burda by the prince of poets Ahmed Shawqi. Al-Shaybani committed to the fact that the verses rhymed without repeating a word from the beginning till the end of his poem, which is something that "Shawqi" or "Al-Busiri" did not adhere to in their poems, making his poem the longest and most unique poem in loving Mohammad.

== Life ==
Khalid Al-Shaybani was born on the 10th of December 1979 in the Kingdom of Saudi Arabia to Egyptian parents who work there, but they soon returned to Cairo and settled in the Egyptian capital where al-Shaybani grew up. His parents ’origins gave him multiple points of view for the Egyptian society. His father is from Upper Egypt from the "Al- Shaybani" family in Sohag, and his mother is from Lower Egypt from the "Munis" family in Mansoura. Khalid lives in the Maadi neighborhood in Cairo, so he developed an image with many dimensions of the Egyptian society in its various directions, and this was driven by his work in journalism and his study of it at an early age. But soon he devoted himself to literary and artistic writings, to show his creativity in poetry, novel, song writing and script. Al-Shaybani is considered the first to combine these four arts of creative writing. Today, He is one of the few who write classic Arabic poetry.

== Awards and honors ==
- Honoring from Ain Shams University for all his artistic and literary works.
- His short film "Chess Turn دور شطرنج " won the Cairo World Cup Shield Award for Artistic Works, the Best Film Award from the Media Science Festival (Bronze), and the Audience Award at the Youssef Chahine Festival 2017.
- He won the Excellence in Poetry Award for the poetry of Snow White from the National Theater Festival in 2018 and he is the first poet to receive an award in poetry from the festival despite reaching its eleventh session.
- He won the Best Story, Screenplay and Dialogue Award from the Sakia Festival for Short Films for his short film ''Chess Turn'' 2019.
- His short film "Chess Turn" won the Best Film Award at the Jerash International Film Festival in Jordan (Bronze).

== Personal life ==
Al-Shaybani is married and has a son, Yassin, and 3 daughters, Fatima, Rodina, and Sajda.

== Poetic works ==
Poetry	Year of Publication	Language Style	Publisher
Baqi min al-Zaman Hayaatak	2002	Classical Arabic	Madbouly for publishing and distribution
Rehlat al-Layl wa Hekayat al-Nahar	2004	Classical Arabic	Madbouly for publishing and distribution
Moahadat Salaam ma' al-Qamar	2012	Classical Arabic	Madbouly for publishing and distribution
'Arsh li Kol Muwaten	2014	Classical Arabic	Madbouly for publishing and distribution
al-Hob wa al-Baroud	2017	Classical Arabic	Madbouly for publishing and distribution
Raheel al-Majarra	2019	Classical Arabic	al-Hasnaa' for publishing and distribution
Zi'baq wa Fedha wa Akhron	2020	Classical Arabic	Bibliomania for publishing and distribution
Hawaa' Ya Watan al-Qalb	under printing	Classical Arabic	–
Eshroun Qessat Hob	under printing	Classical Arabic	–
Doroub al-Samaa – Fi Ishq Allah	under printing	Classical Arabic	–
Alfiyyat al-Quds	under printing	Classical Arabic	–

== Fictional works ==
Novel	Year of Publication	Publisher
Tarkat al-Am Hisab – al-Wasiyah	2016	Madbouly for publishing and distribution
Bila Judran	2017	Madbouly for publishing and distribution
Tarkat al-Am Hisab – Ibn Ghayr Shar'i	2018	Al-Hasnaa for publishing
Al-Harf al-Sadis	2018	Al-Hasnaa for publishing
Tarkat al-Am Hisab – al-Meerath al-Mafqood	2019	Al-Hasnaa for publishing
Ardh al-Uranium	2019	Bibliomania for publishing and distribution
Jannat al-Akatheeb	2020	Bibliomania for publishing and distribution
Mowajaha Fi Alam al-Maraya	under printing	–
Badeel Arabi	under printing	–

== Dramatic works written by him (story, screenplay and dialogue) ==
Title	Type	Year of Publication	Starring	Directed and produced by
Phobia	Feature film	2017	Rami Gheit Amr Ramzy Mirhan Hussein Randa El Behery Ahmed Rateb Nihal Anber Jana Rania Mahmoud Yassin Ayman Kandil Hassan Abdel Fattah Soleiman Eid Badriya Tolba Sabry Abdel Monem Alaa Morsy	Directed by: Ebram Nashaat Production: Samer Jamil
Chess Turn: Won the Cairo Mondial Shield for Artworks 2017; Won the Media Science Festival (Bronze) award 2017; Won the audience award from Youssef Shaheen Festival 2017; Rami Gheit won the best actor from the 2017 Youssef Chahine Festival; Participated in the Alexandria International Film Festival in the official competition 2017; Participate in Sharjah International Festival in the official competition 2018; Khalid Al Shaybani won the best composer from the Sakia Festival 2019; Won the Jerash International Festival Award for Best Film 2019 (Bronze)	short film	2017	Sameh El-Sereety Rami Gheit Sabry Abdel Monem Munir Makram	Directed by: Rami Ayman Production: Salah Hasan
Tarkat al-Am Hisab	Series	under preparation		
Hilogrephy	Feature film	under preparation		
Nayzak Dakrori	Feature film	under preparation	Hani Ramzi	Directed by: Tarek Abdel Moaty

== Lyrics for Dramatic Works ==
Work	Type	Year of Production	Composer and producer	Author and director	Singers	Starring
Snow White	Play	2017	Composer: Hasan Donya Producer: Shareef Mansour	Written and directed by: Mohsen Rezq	El Abtal	Marwa Abdel Moneim Aida Fahmy Moustafa Hagag
Phobia	Film	2017	Composer: Hasan Donya, Wael Aqeed Producer: Shareef Mansour, Mohammed Kattan	Written by: Khalid al-Shaybani Director: Khalid Nash'at	Riko Bahaa al-Hasan Hossam El Sharkawi Ahmed Reda Hossam Amr El Abtal	Rami Gheit Amro Ramzy Mirhan Hussein Randa El Behery Ahmed Rateb Nihal Anbar
Al-Barron	Series	2017	Composer: Wael Aqeed Producer: Shareef Mansour	Written by: Ahmed Sobhi Director: Ehab Amro	Mahmoud Moawad	Amro Abdeljaleel Donya Abdelazeez
Chess Turn	Short film	2017	Composer: Fares al-Watan Producer: Shareef Mansour	Written by: Khalid al-Shaybani Director: Rami Ayman	Bahaa al-Hasan Heba Sulayman	Sameh al-Sorayti Rami Gheit Sabri Abdelmonem Munir Makram
Kalabsh	Series	2017	Composer: Hasan Donya Producer: Rimon Faye'	Written by: Baher Dowaidar Director: Peter Mimi	Khalid Mustafa	Ameer Karara Mohammed Lotfi
Hob Ala Nadafa	Play	2016	composer: Wael Aqeed producer: Mostafa al-Shareef	Written and directed by: Shareef Helmi	El Abtal	Edward Eman Sayyid Mayyar el Gheity
Ana El Ra'ees	Play	2015	composer: Wael Aqeed producer: Samer Adel	written by: Youssif Aof director: Mohsen Rizq	El Abtal	Samih Hossein Hanan Motawe' Nadya Shokri Fathi Saad
Haara Mazno'a	Film	2015	composer: Hasan Donya producer: Rimon Faye'	written by: Mustafa Hamdi director: Peter Mimi	Nader Abu el-Leef	Ahmed Fathi Ola Ghanim Khalid Hamzawy Ayman Mansour
Bard al-Sheta	Film	2015	composer: Hasan Donya, Madeeh Mohsen producer: Sherrif Mansour, Mohammed Kattan	written and directed by: Peter Mimi	Bahaa al-Hasan Ahmad Shawqi	Ramez Ameer Randa el Behery Youssif Shaaban Mamdooh Maddah Nidal Najm
Ahla Kora ma' Barakat	Show	2015	composer: Wael Aqeed producer: Samer Adel, Mohammed Kattan	Radio 9090	Nader Abu el-Leef	Mohammed Barakat
Taheyya Tayyiba wa Saad	Radio drama	2015	composer: Hasan Donya producer: Rimon Faye'	written and directed by: Mohsen Rizq	Amani Nabil	Intisar Yaser al-Tobaji Hasan Hosni Maryam Amin Mohammad Nash'at
El Shayib	Film	2014	composer: Karim Afifi producer: Nawar al-Behery	written by: Sameh Faraj director: Ibram Nash'at	Riko	Riko Sama al-Masri
Hameha wa Harameha	Series	2014	composer: Wael Aqeed, Sharrif el Ghandour producer: Adam Hussein	written by: Mohsen Rizq director: Isam Shaaban	Nader Abu el-Leef Ameena May Kassab El Abtal	Sameh Hussein May Kassab Enjy Wejdan Ahmed Siyam Ayda Reyad Samira Sodqi Ayman Zeydan
Fi El Hawa Sawa	Show	2014	composer: Wael Aqeed producer: Amro Abdelfattah	Al-Nahaar Channel	Edward	Edward

== Song Lyrics ==
Song	SInger	Year of Production
Lon Sha'rek	Kareem Abu Zaid	2004
Feha Haga Di	Jessy	2004
Toffahit Adam	Kareem Abu Zaid	2005
Mesheet Fi Sekka	Akmal Raslan	2006
Mesh Ba'eed	Akmal Raslan	2007
Sallemli Ala Albak	Tareq al-Shaikh	2007
Esma' Wenta Saket	Khaled Radhi	2007
Men Hena wo Rayeh	Laila Ghofran	2008
Nadani Hodnik Ya Omi	Hatem Amour	2008
Albi Hab	Hayfaa Wehbe	2009
Kan Beyetsalla	Leqa' Suwaidan	2010
Seheet men el Noom	May Khayyat	2010
Mahma Olt	Aimee	2010
Misr al-Horra	Atef al-Mak'hel	2011
Awlad Misr	May Khayyat	2012
Shukran Ala el-Risalah	Saeed al-Imam	2013
Al-Mahkama	Shahinaz	2013
Al-Ayyam Dol	Ameena	2013
Ayleen Beyehlamo	May Kassab	2013
Hameha wa Harameha	Nader Abu el-Leef	2013
So'al Beyetrah Nafso	Nader Abu el-Leef	2013
Fi el-Esh Asfoura	Ahmad al-Alem	2013
Fi Set Ayyam	Bahaa Sultan	2014
Asfoura Tayra	Bahaa Sultan	2014
Bad'i Ya Rab	Bahaa Sultan	2014
Rabena Bewasina	Bahaa Sultan	2014
Men Haara Mazno'a	Nader Abu el-Leef	2015
Malaksh Makan	Bahaa el-Hasan	2015
Kolena Ebadek	Nader Abu el-Leef	2015
Habibte Wahshani	Ahmad Fathi	2015
Fedak Nafsi	Mahmoud Yassin el-Tohami	2015
Fi Eshq Allah	Ayda al-Ayyoubi	2015
El Hob Aleeh Hagat	Sameh Houssein Hanan Motawe	2015
Agmal Arousa	Sameh Houssein, Hanan Motawe	2015
Ana el-Ra'ees	Sameh Houssein	2015
Shallout Seyadtak	Sameh Houssein	2015
Ehna el Habeesha	El Abtal	2015
Afareet wa Abalesa	Sameh Houssein, Hanan Motawe	2015
Beladi Ya Mahd al-Hadaara	Sameh Houssein, Hanan Motawe	2015
Hob Men Gheer Amal	Soma	2016
Ya Arham al-Rohamaa	Mahmoud Yassin el-Tohami	2016
Ersem Sekket Ahlamak	Edward, Mayyar el-Gheity	2016
Nemar Fi Bataye'	Mahmoud Moawad	2016
Gammed Albak	Riko	2017
Kan Andi Phobia	Houssam al-Sharqawi	2017
Khod el Hayaa Bel Hodn	Bahaa al Hasan	2017
Ya Salaam Al Shabab	Ahmad Reda	2017
Saheb	Jana	2017
el-Pajama	Houssam Amr	2017
Dor Shatranj	Bahaa el Hasan, Heba Soulayman	2017
Nami Ya Habibat Albi	Marwa Abdelmonem	2017
Bohairet el Omneyat	Marwa Abdelmonem	2017
Merayti ya Merayti	Aida Fahmi	2017
Youm Wahed Bas	El Abtal	2017
Esma'o Kalamha	Aida Fahmi	2017
Malak ya am al-Sayyad	Marwa Abdelmonem	2017
Esabat el'Sabaa Aqzam	Marwa Abdelmonem, El Abtal	2017
Homa Tabo	Marwa Abdelmonem, El Abtal	2017
Saada Fi Saada	El Abtal	2017
Athadda Daafak	Khalid Mostafa	2017
Badaaf Odamo	Mariam Khalifa	2018
Hafakkar Fi Nefsi	Mariam Khalifa	2018
Tedhak Alaya	Mariam Khalifa	2018
Hekayato Kteer	Mariam Khalifa	2018
Mrakkez Maaya	Hanan Marsawi	2018
Wo Galak Ain	Shareef el-Ghandour	2018
010	Hamada al-Tayyib	2019
Neseet Wala Lessa	Rami Gamaal	soon
