= Khalid Zaffar Masoodi =

Indian doctor

Khalid Zaffar Masoodi is an Indian doctor.

== Career ==
Masoodi published his first scientific paper in 2013, describing the use of animal model to increase the efficacy of Intermittent Androgen deprivation therapy for prostate cancer patients.

From 2010 to 2015 The focus of his research was extensively on 3 aspects of Drug discovery and gene discovery against Prostate cancer.

1. Modifying old therapies for Prostate cancer
2. Drug discovery for treating Prostate cancer using small molecule inhibitors (nanoparticles)
3. Gene discovery for prostate cancer that can act as new targets for different therapies.

i. Androgen deprivation therapy (ADT) is the standard treatment for patients with prostate-specific antigen progression after treatment for localized prostate cancer. An alternative to continuous ADT is intermittent ADT (IADT), which allows recovery of testosterone during off-cycles to stimulate regrowth and differentiation of the regressed prostate tumor. His findings suggest that short off-cycle coupled with 5ɑ-reductase inhibition could maximize suppression of prostate tumor growth and, thus improve potential survival benefit achieved in combination with IADT. He found out that the efficacy of IADT can be improved by finasteride or dutasteride administration when short fixed off-cycle intervals are used. Further extrapolating this study in mice he found out that 5α-reductase inhibition in shorter off-cycles of testosterone recovery could maximize tumor growth inhibition during IADT and perhaps increase survival. This finding can be used to help design future clinical trials testing whether 5ARI coupled with short off-cycles can prolong the survival of prostate cancer patients on IADT. For his work Dr. Khalid Masoodi was conferred with Travel Award by the Society of Basic Urology Research (SBUR, USA) for the SBUR 2012 SBUR Fall Symposium held on 15–18 November 2012 at the Trump International Beach Resort in Miami, Florida, USA.

Dr. Khalid Z. Masoodi helped in discovering the role of Four major genes that have a role in prostate cancer progression. The data suggested that DHX15 enhances AR transcriptional activity and contributes to PCa progression through Siah2 mediated ubiquitination of androgen receptor. Another gene Prp8 was shown to be a novel AR cofactor that interacts with NES(AR) and regulates AR function in prostate cancer cells. The study suggested that PABPC1 another candidate is an important AR co-regulator capable of promoting AR nuclear localization and function via interaction with the NTD region. Elevated expression of PABPC1 in prostate cancer specimens is likely to play an important role in prostate carcinogenesis by enhancing AR signalling pathways. Elongation factor, RNA polymerase II, 2 (ELL2) and its pathway genes were shown to play an important role in the development and progression of prostate cancer. For this finding he was conferred with Journal Award for publishing best paper in Endocrinology by Society of Endocrinology, Glasgow, United Kingdom on 19 Nov 2018.

He and his co-workers described high-throughput high-content screening (HCS) campaign to identify small-molecule inhibitors of AR nuclear localization in the C4-2 CRPC cell line stably transfected with GFP-AR. The implementation of this HCS assay to screen a library of 219,055 compounds led to the discovery of 3 small molecules capable of inhibiting AR nuclear localization and function in C4-2 cells, demonstrating the feasibility of using this cell-based phenotypic assay to identify small molecules targeting the subcellular localization of AR.

In 2018, he published four scientific works related to modern biotechnology and cancer research. He discovered three new Synthetic Small Molecules and two Plant based molecules against Prostate cancer, Furthermore, the three hit compounds provide opportunities to develop novel AR drugs with potential for therapeutic intervention in CRPC patients who have relapsed after treatment with anti-androgens, such as abiraterone and/or enzalutamide. These findings suggest that EPPI, CPPI and IMTPPE the three new small molecules could serve as lead structures for the development of therapeutic agents for CRPC including those resistant to enzalutamide. His achievement was highlighted in national Media.

After joining Sher-e-Kashmir University of Agricultural Sciences and technology of Kashmir he continued working in collaboration with University of Pittsburgh apart from venturing into Agricultural Sciences being a PhD in Plant Biotechnology. He started working on medicinal plants and various biotic and abiotic stress in agriculture/horticulture crops. The Himalayan region of J&K being a rich repertoire of around 3054 medicinal and aromatic plant species (MAPs) that are endogenous to Kashmir valley and were not explored for anticancer properties against prostate cancer through Transcriptomics. He consolidated 150 Medicinal plants in form of the first book he published.

Simultaneously at SKUAST-Kashmir he started working on Cold tolerance in tomato and Biotic stress like Apple Scab and Chili wilt. He conducted a thorough study on Apple scab pathogen from all regions of J&K for the first time. While working on Scab he deciphered the whole transcriptome of Apple of endogenous varieties for the first time (GEO, NCBI.nlm.nih.gov).
