= Khalid Shahanshah =

Pakistani official

Khalid Shahanshah (Urdu: خالد شهنشاه) was a Pakistani official who served as security chief of President Benazir Bhutto's residence. He was also a close advisor to President Asif Ali Zardari.

In 2002, Shahanshah participated in the elections for a seat in the National Assembly of Pakistan.
