= Khalid Hussain Qasmi =

Indian Islamic scholar, mufti and writer (b. 1978)

Mufti Mohammad Khalid Hussain Qasmi
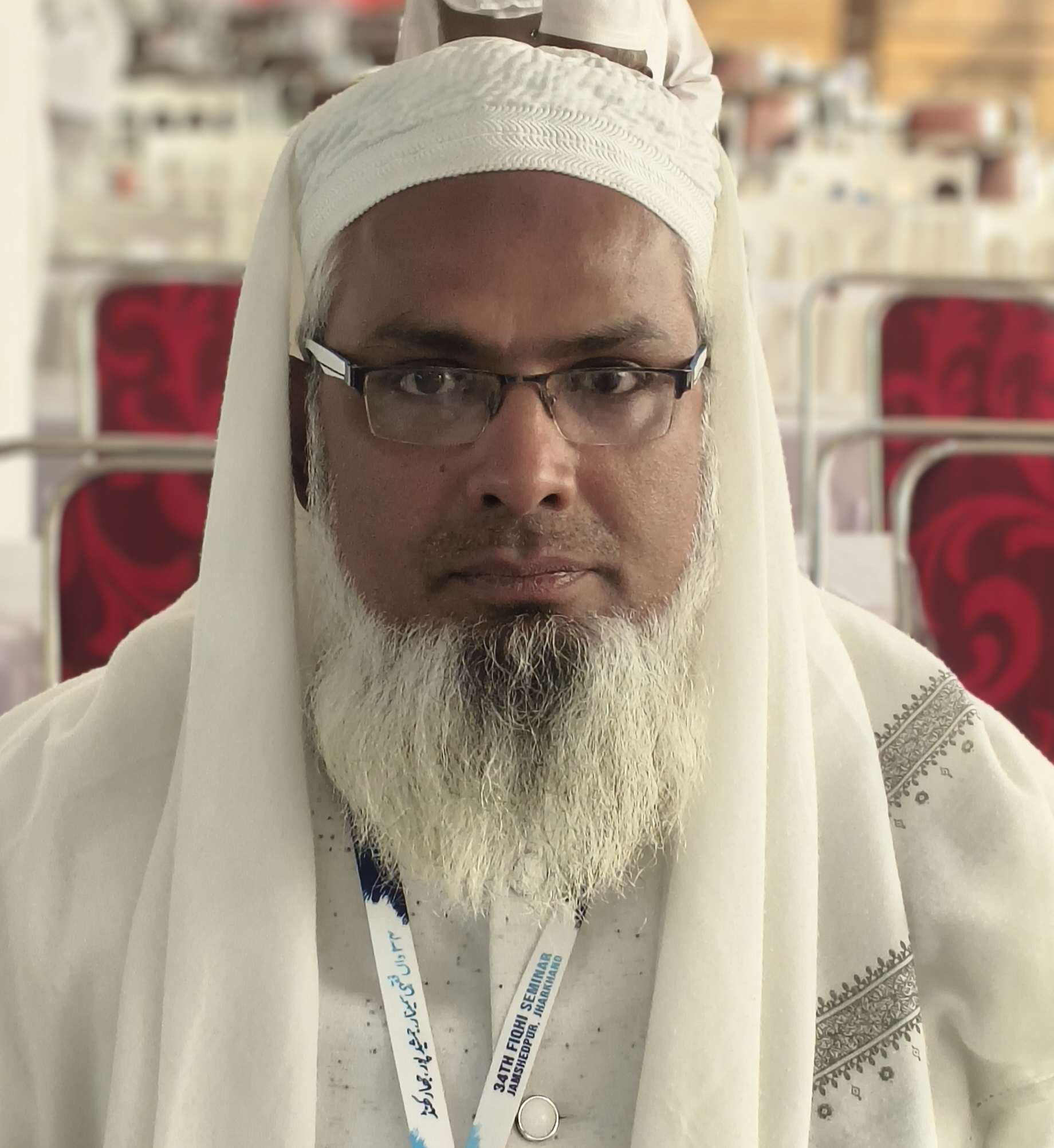
- Qasmi at the 34th Seminar of the Islamic Fiqh Academy (India), held in Jamshedpur, Jharkhand
- Born: 1978 (age 47–48); Neema, Begusarai district, Bihar, India
- Education: Darul Uloom Deoband, Maulana Azad National Urdu University
- Occupations: Islamic scholar, writer, teacher
- Known for: Urdu language advocacy, Islamic scholarship
- Awards: National Award to Teachers (2013)

Mohammad Khalid Hussain Qasmi (born 1978), commonly known as Mufti Khalid Nimvi, is an Indian Islamic scholar, educator, and writer from Bihar. He is noted for his contributions to Urdu literature, Islamic jurisprudence, and religious education in India.

== Early life and education ==
Mohammad Khalid Hussain Qasmi was born in 1978 in Neema, a village in the Begusarai district of Bihar, India. He began his Islamic education at local madrasas and later joined Darul Uloom Deoband, graduating in 1996. He completed a specialization in Islamic jurisprudence (Ifta) in 1997 and teacher training in 1998. He also earned a B.A. from Maulana Azad National Urdu University, Hyderabad.

== Career ==
=== Teaching and administration ===
Qasmi began his teaching career at Darul Uloom Deoband as an assistant teacher. In 2000, he was appointed as the first Sadr Mudarris (Head Teacher) at Darul Uloom Islamia of Imarat-e-Shariah, Patna, where he served until 2006. He is currently serving as the principal of Madrasa Badr al-Islam in Begusarai.

He has been involved in teacher training workshops and educational reforms, particularly in combining traditional and modern teaching methodologies.

=== International participation ===
In 2023, Qasmi participated in the general assembly of the International Union of Muslim Scholars in Doha, Qatar. He represented India and addressed themes related to religious education and Islamic identity.

== Awards and recognition ==
Qasmi was one of the recipients of the National Award to Teachers in 2014 for the year 2013 in the category of Arabic/Persian educators. The award was conferred by President Pranab Mukherjee on Teachers’ Day.

== Views ==
In 2014, Qasmi commented on a case in Bihar where a Muslim woman was reportedly expelled from her home for attending an Independence Day function. He stated that such participation is not against Islamic law and criticized the misuse of Shariah in the case.

In an interview published by The Indian Express on Teachers' Day 2014, Qasmi expressed his desire to instill a sense of social and national responsibility among students. He emphasized that Muslim students have enthusiasm to contribute to the nation and urged that they be provided appropriate platforms to realize their potential.

== Literary works ==
Qasmi began writing while still a student. His first article, Islami Qanoon ki Jami'iyat, was published in Ayina-e-Darul Uloom.

He has authored articles on jurisprudence, Islamic history, and socio-religious topics. Some of his notable essays discuss legal issues such as annulment of marriage due to discord (Shiqāq Bain al-Zawjain), modern issues in fasting, and the status of currency notes in Islamic law.

His published books include:

- Khawateen ki Azmat aur unke Huqooq Islam ki Nazar mein (Women’s Rights in Islam), published by the All India Muslim Personal Law Board
- Ahadith al-Nawahi
- Jamhuri Nizam mein Intikhabat se Mutalliq Masa'il (Elections in a Democratic System: Shari‘ah Perspectives)
- Tafsir wa Usool al-Tafsir: Ek Ta'aruf (Introduction to Tafsir and its Principles)
- Tadrees mein Tasheel aur Asbab ka Istemaal (Facilitating Education and Use of Tools)
