= Ministry of Civil Service (Oman) =

Governmental body in the Sultanate of Oman

Coordinates: 23°36′7″N 58°25′26″E

Sultanate of Oman Ministry of Civil Service
- وزارة الخدمة المدنية
- National emblem of Oman

Agency overview
- Formed: 21 February 1988
- Dissolved: 18 August 2020
- Jurisdiction: Government of Oman
- Headquarters: Muscat (Oman)
- Agency executives: Khalid bin Omar Al Marhoon, Minister; Salem bin Musallam Al Busaidi, Undersecretary for Management Development; Abdul Rahman Al Abri, Undersecretary for Civil Service Affairs
- Website: Former official website

The Ministry of Civil Service was a ministry of the Sultanate of Oman responsible for all matters relating to the civil service. It was abolished on 18 August 2020 under Royal Decree 89/2020, which transferred its assets, rights, obligations, holdings and employees to the newly established Ministry of Labour.

Khalid bin Omar Al Marhoon served as Minister of Civil Service. Abdulrahman bin Ibrahim Al Abri served as Undersecretary for Civil Service Affairs, while Salim bin Mussalam Al Busaidi served as Undersecretary for Administrative Development Affairs.

== History ==
The civil service administration in Oman predates the establishment of the Ministry. In 1975, Royal Decree 27/75 introduced the Civil Service Law and Royal Decree 28/75 set out the composition of the Civil Service Council. A revised Civil Service Law was subsequently enacted under Royal Decree 8/80 in February 1980, replacing the earlier legislation. The founding decree appointed Ahmed bin Abdulnabi Makki as Minister of the Civil Service and Juma bin Hamad Al Nasri as undersecretary. The decree also placed the Institute of Public Administration under the newly established ministry. The ministry's organisational structure was initially approved under Royal Decree 48/88 on 14 June 1988. Subsequently, its responsibilities and organisational structure were revised by Royal Decree 89/98 on 2 December 1998. It was reorganised again under Royal Decree 142/2008 on 29 December 2008. On 6 July 2009, Abdulrahman bin Ibrahim Al Abri and Salem bin Mussalam Al Busaidi were both appointed as undersecretaries by Royal Decree 41/2009. Meanwhile, Khalid bin Omar Al Marhoon was appointed Minister of Civil Service in the cabinet reshuffle on 7 March 2011 under Royal Decree 31/2011.

On 18 August 2020, Royal Decree 89/2020 abolished the Ministry of the Civil Service, the Ministry of Manpower, the Civil Service Council, the National Training Fund, and the National Employment Centre. The responsibilities of these bodies were transferred to the newly formed Ministry of Labour.

== Responsibilities ==
According to Royal Decree 142/2008, the Ministry of the Civil Service was responsible for developing and implementing policies relating to public administration, human resources and organisational development within government institutions subject to the Civil Service Law. The ministry's duties included proposing civil service legislation and regulations, supporting the Civil Service Council, reviewing organisational structures and coordinating administrative reforms. It monitored compliance with civil service regulations through inspections, examined employee complaints and enquiries, and coordinated security clearances with the relevant authorities. It also provided technical assistance to government institutions and supported the development of administrative procedures and information systems.

The ministry administered centralised recruitment procedures and coordinated Omanisation programmes with the aim of increasing the number of Omani employees in the government. The ministry also oversaw employee training and professional development. It reviewed staffing requirements, job classifications, and qualification standards, and proposed personnel budgets, including salaries, allowances, and compensation. It was also responsible for evaluating government positions, assessing training programmes and maintaining electronic human resource management systems. Recruitment depended on the staffing needs identified by individual government institutions and the budgetary allocations approved for them. The ministry's authority generally excluded institutions operating under separate personnel legislation.
