= Khalid bin Sayeed =

Pakistani Canadian political scientist and historian (1926–2011)

- Born: November 20, 1926; Bellary, British India
- Died: April 11, 2011 (aged 84); Canada
- Education: Madras University; London School of Economics; McGill University
- Occupations: Political scientist, historian, academic
- Known for: Scholarship on the political history of Pakistan
- Notable work: Pakistan: The Formative Phase, 1857–1948 (1960); The Political System of Pakistan (1967); Politics in Pakistan: The Nature and Direction of Change (1980); Western Dominance and Political Islam (1995)
- Spouse: Janet Noel Callender (m. 1954)
- Children: 2
- Awards: Fulbright Grant (1953–54); Ford Foundation Grant (1957–59); Nuffield Grant (1961)

Khalid bin Sayeed (20 November 1926 – 11 April 2011) was a Pakistani-born Canadian political scientist and historian who wrote books on the politics of Pakistan and Muslim nationalism in South Asia. He served for over three decades as Professor of Political Studies at Queen's University in Kingston, Ontario, Canada, where he was later professor emeritus and adjunct professor of history.

== Early life and education ==
Khalid bin Sayeed was born on 20 November 1926 in Bellary, British India, the eldest son of Abdul Rahman and Sayeeda Sayeed. He grew up in Hyderabad Deccan and studed at the Jesuit-run Loyola College in Madras. He completed a bachelor's degree and a Master of Arts at the University of Madras in 1948, followed by a BSc in economics from the London School of Economics in 1951. He moved to North America and completed his PhD at McGill University in Montreal.

== Career ==
After the partition of India, Sayeed worked on the reconstruction of the University of Dacca in East Pakistan. He held research fellowships including a Fulbright (1953–54), a Ford Foundation grant (1957–59) and a Nuffield grant (1961).

Sayeed began his academic career in Canada as assistant professor at the University of New Brunswick from 1959 to 1961, before moving to Queen's University in Kingston, Ontario in 1961. He rose through the ranks to full Professor of Political Studies and remained at Queen's until his retirement in 1992, when he was named professor emeritus and appointed adjunct professor of history.

== Selected works ==
- Pakistan: The Formative Phase (Karachi: Pakistan Publishing House, 1960; revised editions Oxford University Press, 1968, 1992).
- The Political System of Pakistan (Houghton Mifflin, 1967).
- Politics in Pakistan: The Nature and Direction of Change (Praeger, 1980).
- Western Dominance and Political Islam: Challenge and Response (SUNY Press, 1995).
