= Faleh bin Ghanem Al-Thani =

Sheikh Faleh bin Ghanem Al-Thani الشيخ فالح بن غانم آل ثاني

Vice President of General Union of Arab Producers
- In office 11 January 2021 – now

Personal details
- Born: Sheikh Faleh bin Ghanem Al-Thani; 1 February 1967 (age 59) Doha, Qatar
- Height: 1.70 m (5 ft 7 in)
- Occupation: Qatari media and sport personality, founder, and CEO of Tethkar for art and music production company and Olive FM

Sheikh Faleh bin Ghanem Al-Thani (Arabic: الشيخ فالح بن غانم آل ثاني; born 1 February 1967) is a Qatari media and sport personality from the ruling family of Qatar the House of Thani, a prominent businessman, and the Vice President of the General Union of Arab Producers and President of the Qatari Producers Union. He is also the owner, founder, and CEO of Tethkar for art and music production company, and Founder of Olive FM and Tethkar FM.

== Education and career ==
Al-Thani married with four children and he studied at Jassim Bin Hamad High School and graduated. He holds a bachelor's degree in business administration from Beirut Arab University. He was elected by acclamation as Vice President of the General Union of Arab Producers, and is currently the President of the Qatari Producers Union. He is the owner, founder, and CEO of Tathkar Art Production Company. He was a player for Al-Wakrah SC, then retired and became the head of the football department at Al-Wakrah SC between 1997 and 2002.

== See also ==
- Al-Wakrah SC
