= Mahjabeen Khaled =

Bangladeshi politician

- মাহজাবিন খালেদ
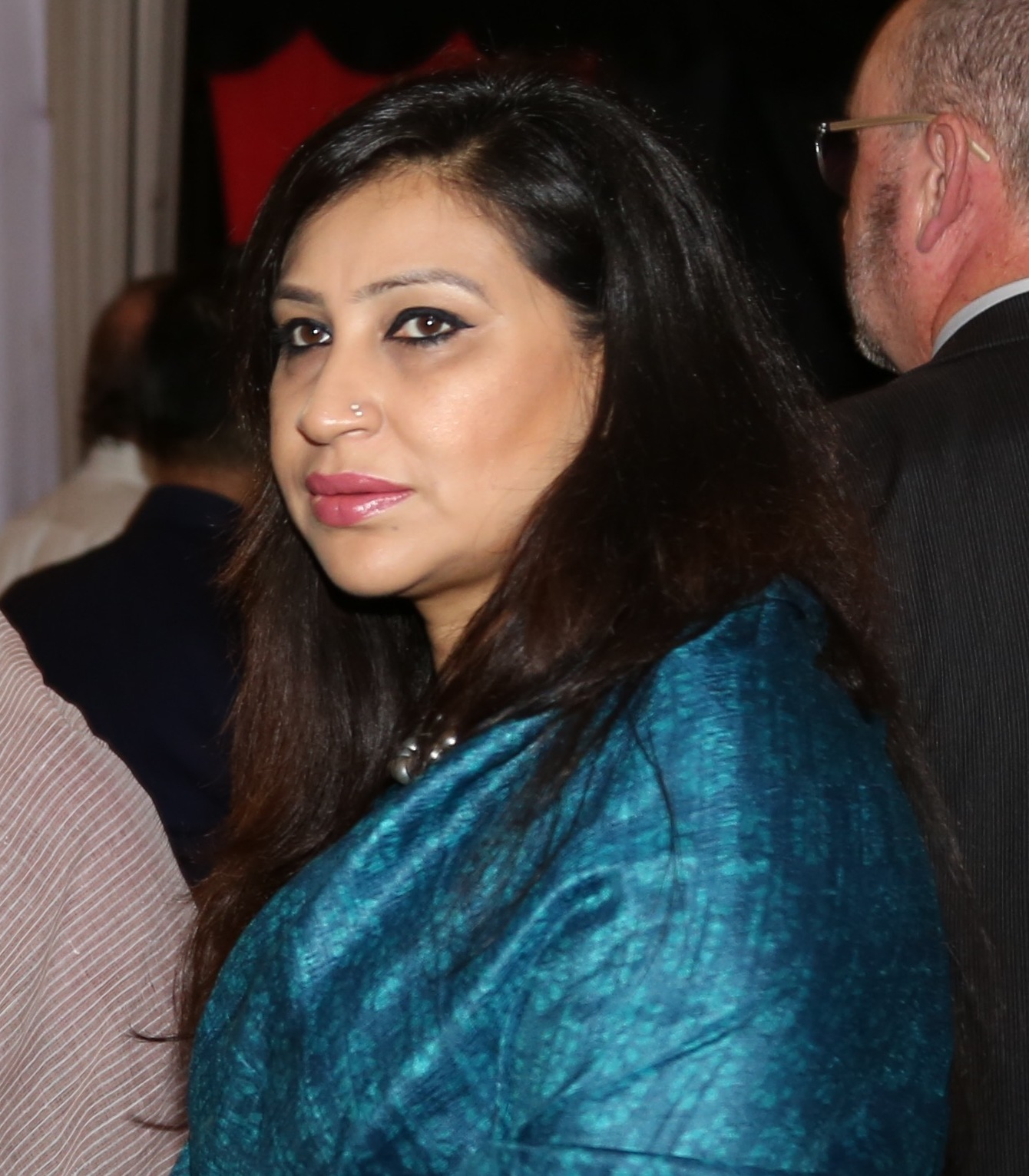

Member of Parliament
- In office 20 March 2014 – 20 March 2019
- Constituency: Women's Reserved Seat-18

Personal details
- Born: 16 December 1966 (age 59)
- Party: Awami League
- Parent: Khaled Mosharraf (father)
- Occupation: Politician

Mahjabeen Khaled (born 16 December 1966) is a Bangladeshi politician. She is a former Member of Parliament from Women's Reserved Seat. She was a former member of the Parliamentary Standing Committee on Foreign Affairs. She is the daughter of Major General Khaled Mosharraf.

== Early life ==
Mahjabeen Khaled was born on 16 December 1966 in Dhaka. Her father, Major General Khaled Musharraf, was the Sector Commander of the Mukti Bahini's Sector 2 and the Commander-in-Chief of the K Force. Later he became the Chief of General Staff (CGS) of the Bangladesh Army.

Her Father Khaled mosharraf was killed on 7 November 1975. She is the eldest daughter of him.

== Education ==
Mahjabin Khaled passed Secondary School Certificate (SSC) from Holy Cross School and College. She studied at Loreto College, Darjeeling. Later did BA (Hons).

== Career ==
As a member of the Awami League, Mahjabin Khaled was a Member of Parliament. As a member of the Parliamentary Standing Committee for Foreign Affairs, she has toured various countries with a delegation of delegates to enhance the country's diplomatic communication skills. Mahzabin is also working to raise global awareness on the liberation war and war crimes in Bangladesh. Child Rights has played a role in the Caucus and Climate Parliament as part of the Bangladeshi delegates to the UN General Assembly.

Earlier in her career, she has been active in various development agencies and has been vocal on contemporary issues of national interest, human rights, rule of law, interfaith issues, peace, economy and the rights of people with disabilities.
