= Khalid bin Hamad Al Busaidi =

Omani royal

- Born: 7 June 1964 (age 61); Muscat, Oman
- Arabic: خالد بن حمد بن حمود البوسعيدي
- House: Al Said
- Religion: Ibadi Islam

Sayyid Khalid bin Hamad Al Busaidi (Arabic: خالد بن حمد بن حمود البوسعيدي, romanized: Khālid ibn Ḥamad ibn Ḥammūd al-Būsaʻīdī; born 7 June 1964 in Muscat) is an Omani, business owner, musician and sportsman. He is also the former chairman of the Oman Football Association.

== Early life ==
Al Busaidi attended Sultan School before completing his MBA at Henley Business School at the University of Reading, England. In 1986, after finishing his studies, Al Busaidi relocated back to Oman to take up a sports role as the vice president of Fanja Sports Club until 1988.

== Career ==
Al Busaidi is chairman of SABCO Group (1988 – present), based in Oman, which is one of the largest business groups in the country. Currently SABCO group is home to a large portfolio of companies including Amouage, one of the most well-known niche fragrance and luxury brands in the world.

The group also includes:

- SABCO Media: Al Wisal FM, Merge 104.8, Virgin Radio Oman, Outdoor Media
- Events & Exhibitions Connect, SABCO Sports
- Manufacturing National Mineral Water Company, Voltamp, Oman Abrasives
- Automotive / Electrical OMASCO
- SABCO Properties SABCO Centre

== Football ==
Al Busaidi is best known for his role as chairman of the Oman Football Association (OFA) which began in 2007. During his leadership the Oman National Team won the 19th Gulf Cup for the first time ever in 2009. Following this achievement, he received the Order of Oman Civil Decoration from The Late His Majesty Sultan Qaboos bin Said. He went on to hold this position until 2016.

In 1988 Al Busaidi assumed the presidency of Fanja Club until 1991 making him one of the most well-known sports and social figures in the country. During his time Fanja Club qualified, for the first time in the history of Omani sports, to the Arab Football Finals and achieved fourth place at the Asian Finals during the same game. The club went on to win the seventh Football Gulf Cup for Clubs in 1989, an achievement which was marked as an unmatched attainment for Omani clubs in the history of Omani sports. He went on to become the first-ever elected chairman of the Oman Football Association in the first direct elections to be held in Oman and the Gulf region in 2007.

He delivered a vision for the future of Omani football entitled ‘Transforming Football into a prosperous industry’. Joseph Sepp Blatter, the president of the International Football Federation FIFA and Mohammed bin Hammam Al Abdullah, the president of the Asian Football Confederation (AFC) then invited him to visit FIFA and the AFC to learn more about his vision.

== Oman Olympic Committee ==
Al Busaidi became a board director of the Oman Olympic Committee in 2012. He was one of the torch bearers of the International Olympics for the Beijing Olympics in 2008 as it passed through Muscat, the Omani capital. In August 2019 he was elected as the chairman of the Oman Olympic Committee and held this position for a number of years.

== Music ==
Al Busaidi's compositions have been used locally, regionally and international by multiple performers (most notably by singer and television personality Ahlam Al Shamsi). Al Busaidi has composed more than 200 songs, the most famous being a national song titled ‘The Years Glow With You’.

His lifelong interest in music began in primary school when he began playing the accordion and drums in a music group and partaking in school theatres and performances. He began composing at the age of 18 and his first two songs (titled ‘A Greeting of Love’ and ‘Bright Beacon’) were released in 1983 airing on Oman TV. In 2004, he became vice-chairman of the Omani Song Festival and later went on to appear as a judge on Dubai TV's Gulf Talent show.

Al Busaidi plays the oud, lute, keyboard, accordion and Kanoun, and continues to create music on a regular basis in Oman (Muscat and Salalah), United Arab Emirates and Egypt.
