= Khalid Al Munif =

Saudi writer

Khaled Almunif
- Born: 1975 (age 50–51)
- Citizenship: Saudi Arabia
- Education: Bachelors in religion
- Occupation: Author
- Notable work: book (Royal phase)

Khalid bin Saleh bin Ibrahim (Arabic:خالد المنيف) is a Saudi author. He has written books on psychology and self-development. He was born in 1975. He writes weekly for Al-Jazeera newspaper. Also, he supervises on Refresh your life page, and he has written many self-improvement publications like Open the Window There's a Light, and Royal Phase.

== Education ==
- Bachelor's Degree – Collage Of Sharia – Major in Islamic Sharia .
- Bachelor's Degree in Administration Science – Accounting major.
- Master Of Business Administration – Human Resources Administration.

== Works ==
- Open the window there is a light
- Color your life
- A date with life 1 & 2
- Falls with roses
- You are spring so what if something shriveled
- You are born to win
- Ideas to live by
- On the shore of joy
- Tastes
- Your morning smile
- Happiness grocery
- Royal phase
- Khaled selections
- Grow up your brain
