= Khalid Saeed (politician) =

Pakistani politician

Member of the Provincial Assembly of the Punjab
- In office 29 May 2013 – 31 May 2018

Personal details
- Born: 1 January 1958 (age 68)
- Party: Pakistan Muslim League (Nawaz)

Haji Khalid Saeed is a Pakistani politician who was a Member of the Provincial Assembly of the Punjab, from May 2013 to May 2018.

== Early life ==
He was born on 1 January 1958.

== Political career ==
He was elected to the Provincial Assembly of the Punjab as a candidate of Pakistan Muslim League (Nawaz) from Constituency PP-66 (Faisalabad-XVI) in the 2013 Pakistani general election.
