= Mohammed Ahmad (footballer, born 1992) =

Emirati footballer

Mohammed Ahmad محمد أحمد
Personal information
- Full name: Mohammed Ahmad Bin Yousef Al-Shehhi
- Date of birth: 3 September 1992 (age 34)
- Place of birth: Emirates
- Height: 1.81 m (5 ft 11 in)
- Position: Midfielder

Youth career
- 2006–2013: Al-Shabab

Senior career*
Years	Team	Apps	(Gls)
2013–2014	Al-Shabab		
2014–2015	Hatta		
2015–2017	Dibba Al-Hisn		
2017–2022	Ajman	81	(0)
2022–2023	Al Bataeh	18	(0)
2023–2025	Al Urooba		
2024–2025	→ Al-Hamriyah (loan)		
- * Club domestic league appearances and goals

Mohammed Ahmad (Arabic:محمد أحمد) (born 3 September 1992) is an Emirati footballer who plays as a midfielder.

== Career ==
He formerly played for Al-Shabab, Hatta, Dibba Al-Hisn, and Ajman.
