= Khalid al-Zahrani =

Saudi terrorist and former Guantanamo Bay detainee

Khalid Saeed Ahmad al-Zahrani
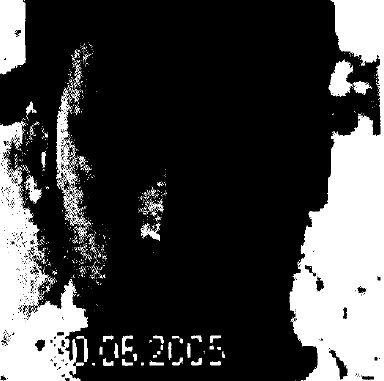
- Detained at: Guantanamo
- ISN: 234
- Charge: no charge extrajudicial detention
- Status: repatriated in July 2007

A Saudi candidate to become one of the September 11 hijackers, Khalid Saeed Ahmad al-Zahrani (often misspelled as Zaharni) was an al-Qaeda member, held in extrajudicial detention in the United States's Guantanamo Bay detention camps, in Cuba. His Guantanamo Internment Serial Number was 234. His arrival in Guantanamo is recorded as February 11, 2002. His repatriation is recorded as July 17, 2007. His first interrogation was recorded on April 20, 2002.

According to the 9/11 Commission, he attended "terrorist training camps", including Al Farouq in Afghanistan for eleven years. The 9/11 Commission reports:

Khalid Saeed Ahmad al-Zahrani. He traveled to Afghanistan illegally after being prohibited by Saudi authorities from leaving Saudi Arabia. After being assigned to a mission in the U.S., he secretly reentered the Kingdom but failed in an attempt to have his name removed from the list of prohibited travelers so that he could obtain a U.S. visa. See Intelligence reports, interrogations of detainee, April 20, 2002; October 4, 2002; April 3, 2003.

He was sent, but failed, to convince Mushabib al-Hamlan not to abandon his training, after Hamlan left the training camp to remain with his ill mother.

He was later selected for an unknown mission in the United States, believed to have been the 9/11 hijackings, and re-entered Saudi Arabia to apply for a legitimate travel visa, but was denied an application because his name was on a Saudi watchlist of persons to be refused to travel outside the country.

== Combatant Status Review Tribunal ==
Combatant Status Review Tribunals were held in a 3 x 5 meter trailer. The captive sat with his hands and feet shackled to a bolt in the floor. Three chairs were reserved for members of the press, but only 37 of the 574 Tribunals were observed.

Initially the Bush administration asserted that they could withhold all the protections of the Geneva Conventions to captives from the war on terror. This policy was challenged before the Judicial branch. Critics argued that the USA could not evade its obligation to conduct competent tribunals to determine whether captives are, or are not, entitled to the protections of prisoner of war status.

Subsequently, the Department of Defense instituted the Combatant Status Review Tribunals. The Tribunals, however, were not authorized to determine whether the captives were lawful combatants—rather they were merely empowered to make a recommendation as to whether the captive had previously been correctly determined to match the Bush administration's definition of an enemy combatant.

=== Summary of Evidence memo ===
A Summary of Evidence memo was prepared for Combatant Status Review Tribunal on September 24, 2004. The memo listed seven allegations:

a. The detainee is a Taliban member and is associated with al Qaida:

1. The detainee is a Saudi Arabian national who volunteered to travel to Afghanistan to fight against the Northern Alliance in May 2001.
2. The detainee traveled to Kut Bakram training camp in Kabul, Afghanistan, where he received training on the Kalishnikov rifle and rocket-propelled grenades (RPGs).
3. The detainee was in possession of a Casio watch and the model is linked to bombings committed by al Qaida and other radical Islamic terrorists.

b. The detainee engaged in hostilities against the United States or its coalition partners.

1. The detainee was on the front line in an area called Kut Kalif in Kabul, Afghanistan.
2. The detainee was in a fighting position in the Tora Bora mountain region from 23 November 2001 until 18 December 2001.
3. The detainee stated when the United States began bombing his area his group was ordered to leave the area and go to Pakistan.
4. The detainee stated he was captured after crossing the border into Pakistan.

== Hunger strike ==
In 2005, he partook in a hunger strike to protest the Qur'an desecration controversy.

=== Administrative Review Board ===
Detainees whose Combatant Status Review Tribunal labeled them "enemy combatants" were scheduled for annual Administrative Review Board hearings. These hearings were designed to assess the threat a detainee might pose if released or transferred, and whether there were other factors that warranted his continued detention.

=== 2005 Administrative Review Board hearing ===
A Summary of Evidence memo was prepared for Khalid al-Zahrani's first annual Administrative Review Board. The three page memo listed 16 "primary factors [which] favor continued detention" and 1 "primary factor [which] favors release or transfer".

Among the factors al-Zahrani faced were:

- The allegation that he visited an audio store owned by "Abu Hassan", where he listened to jihad speeches.
- The allegation that Sheik Bin Gebreen and Sheik Bin Augla gave him advice on travel routes for traveling to Afghanistan for jihad.
- The allegation that he served on the front line in Kut Kalif in Kabul.
- The allegation that "was in a fighting position in the Tora Bora mountain region from 23 November 2001 until 18 December 2001."
- The allegation that he trained on AK-47s and rocket-propelled grenades at the Kut Bakrarn training camp in Kabul.
- The allegation that his name was found on a list of 324 Arabic names, and several other suspicious lists.
- The allegation that his name was found on a file "titled 'al jawazat.doc' which translates to 'passports .doc'. This document contains tables labeled: name, nationality, safety-deposit box number, contents and comments."
- The allegation that "a chat session from 2 September 2002 which contained the following entry: 'Khalid bin Muhammad bin'Ali al-Zahrani Abu al-Jarah from al Kharg-al Jazirah which is his parents."
- The allegation that he was in possession of a Casio F91W.

=== 2006 Administrative Review Board hearing ===
A Summary of Evidence memo was prepared for Khalid Mohammed Al Zahrani's second annual Administrative Review Board. The three page memo listed 20 "primary factors [which] favor continued detention" and 1 "primary factor [which] favors release or transfer".

Among the additional factors al-Zahrani faced were:

- The allegation that his name was found in a chat session recovered from the computer of one of the individuals involved in an attack on US Marines at Faylaka Island, Kuwait in October 2002.
- The allegation that he traveled to Afghanistan in May 2001.
- The allegation that his name was found on a list of mujahedin that arrived in Afghanistan in December 2001.

== Repatriation ==
On November 26, 2008, the Department of Defense published a list of the dates captives were transferred from Guantanamo. According to that list, al-Zahrani was repatriated on July 15, 2007.
