= Khalid Abdulrahman =

Khalid Abdulrahman خالد عبد الرحمن
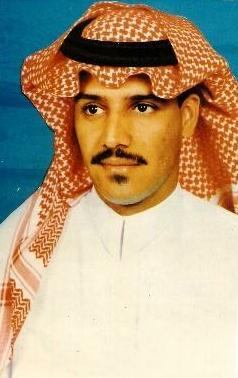
- Khalid Abdulrahman, c. 1989

Background information
- Born: Khalid ibn Abdulrahman ibn Mohammed al-Wadani al-Dosari خالد بن عبد الرحمن بن محمد الودعاني الدوسري; 22 April 1965 (age 60)
- Origin: Riyadh, Saudi Arabia
- Genres: Saudi Arabian, Arabic Music
- Occupations: Singer, actor, composer, songwriter
- Instrument: Oud
- Years active: 1980's–present

Khalid Abdulrahman (Arabic: خالد عبدالرحمن; born 22 April 1965) is a Saudi singer, actor, musician, poet, and songwriter. He is also a member of the Dawasir tribe. He first published poetry under the pseudonym 'Night Dweller' (Arabic: مخاوي الليل) before revealing his true identity. Though Khalid did not want to be famous for his singing as he wanted to be for his poetry and retired for a month, but peers and fellow artists urged him to take up singing again.

He started singing in 1988. Some of his top songs are "Ahat" (Arabic: اهات), "Sarihini" (Arabic: صارحيني), "Sudiqini" (Arabic: صدقيني), "Khuberooh" (Arabic: خبروه), "Tedhkar" (Arabic :تذكار), and "Al-ata" (Arabic: العطا) and a lot more. He released an album Rouh Rouhey (Arabic: روح روحي) (Soul of my Soul) in 2008. It contains 8 songs. He continued his career with works such as Khalideat (Arabic: خالديات) in 2010, Thani (Arabic: ثاني) in 2013, La Yrooh Balk (Arabic: لا يروح بالك) in 2014, and Al Hob Alkabeer (Arabic: الحب الكبير) in 2016. His latest song is (تنتخي بي).

Khalid Abdulrahman is known for his authenticity and often wrote music on his own to convey his personal emotions and experiences. Regardless of his fame, he's a private person and rarely appears in media interviews, allowing his music to speak for itself.
