= List of Qatari football transfers summer 2012 =

This is a list of Qatari football transfers for the 2012 summer transfer window by club. Only transfers of clubs in the Qatar Stars League are included.

Players without a club may join one at any time, either during or in between transfer windows.

== Qatar Stars League ==
=== Al-Arabi ===
In: Note: Flags indicate national team as defined under FIFA eligibility rules; some limited exceptions apply. Players may hold more than one non-FIFA nationality.

No.	Pos.	Nation	Player
—	FW	MAR	Youssouf Hadji (from (France) Rennes)
—	MF	MAR	Houssine Kharja (from (Italy) Fiorentina)
—	DF	AUS	Matthew Špiranović (from (Japan) Urawa Red Diamonds)
—	DF	QAT	Emad Nasser (from Al Ahli)
—	DF	SEN	Baba Keita (from Al-Wakrah)
—	FW	BRA	Baré (from (United Arab Emirates) Al Jazira Club)

Out: Note: Flags indicate national team as defined under FIFA eligibility rules; some limited exceptions apply. Players may hold more than one non-FIFA nationality.

No.	Pos.	Nation	Player
8	DF	QAT	Waleed Mohiuddin (to Umm Salal)
2	DF	QAT	Maaz Yousef (to Al-Wakrah)
23	DF	QAT	Yusuf Jafar (to Al Kharaitiyat)
55	DF	IRN	Hadi Aghili (to Qatar SC)
10	FW	ARG	Leonardo Pisculichi (to (China) Shandong Luneng)
5	DF	QAT	Johar Al Kaabi (to Al-Wakrah)

=== Al-Gharafa ===
In: Note: Flags indicate national team as defined under FIFA eligibility rules; some limited exceptions apply. Players may hold more than one non-FIFA nationality.

No.	Pos.	Nation	Player
—	DF	QAT	Meshal Mubarak (from Al Rayyan)
—	DF	QAT	Ali Jumaa (from Al Khor)
—	MF	QAT	Jawad Ahnash (on loan from Umm Salal)
—	MF	BRA	Alex (from (Brazil) Corinthians)
—	FW	QAT	Waleed Hamza (from Al Wakrah)
—	MF	AUS	Mark Bresciano (from Al Nasr)

Out: Note: Flags indicate national team as defined under FIFA eligibility rules; some limited exceptions apply. Players may hold more than one non-FIFA nationality.

No.	Pos.	Nation	Player
8	FW	CIV	Aruna Dindane (to Al Sailiya)
14	MF	QAT	Mohammed Yasser (to Umm Salal)
18	MF	QAT	Mirghani Al Zain (to Al Sailiya)
20	DF	MAR	Otmane El Assas (on loan to Umm Salal)
33	DF	QAT	Ahmed Faris Al-Binali (retired)
91	FW	QAT	Mohammed Harees (on loan to Al Kharaitiyat)
—	DF	QAT	Saeed El Hadj (to Umm Salal)

=== Al Kharaitiyat ===
In: Note: Flags indicate national team as defined under FIFA eligibility rules; some limited exceptions apply. Players may hold more than one non-FIFA nationality.

No.	Pos.	Nation	Player
—	MF	QAT	Yusuf Jafar (from Al-Arabi)
—	MF	QAT	Mohammed Harees (on loan from Al-Gharafa)
—	MF	IRN	Andranik Teymourian (from (Iran) Esteghlal)
—	MF	QAT	Abdulaziz Karim (from Al Ahli)
—	DF	BRA	Domingos (from (Brazil) Guarani)
10	FW	COD	Alain Dioko (on loan from Al Ahli)

Out: Note: Flags indicate national team as defined under FIFA eligibility rules; some limited exceptions apply. Players may hold more than one non-FIFA nationality.

No.	Pos.	Nation	Player
—	MF	NGA	Onyekachi Okonkwo (to (South Africa) Orlando Pirates)

=== Al-Khor ===
In: Note: Flags indicate national team as defined under FIFA eligibility rules; some limited exceptions apply. Players may hold more than one non-FIFA nationality.

No.	Pos.	Nation	Player
—	MF	QAT	Hamood Al Yazidi (from Al Sadd)
—	DF	QAT	Saleh Mousa (from Lekhwiya)
—	DF	QAT	Sultan Saleem (from Al Ahli)
—	DF	QAT	Sultan Mahoush Al-Ruwaili (from Al-Shahaniya)

Out: Note: Flags indicate national team as defined under FIFA eligibility rules; some limited exceptions apply. Players may hold more than one non-FIFA nationality.

No.	Pos.	Nation	Player
9	FW	BFA	Moumouni Dagano (loan return to Lekhwiya)
10	MF	ALG	Mourad Meghni (loan return to Umm Salal)
12	DF	QAT	Mosaab Mahmoud (to El Jaish)
13	DF	QAT	Ali Jumaa (to Al-Gharafa)
31	DF	IRQ	Salam Shakir (released)

=== Al Rayyan ===
In: Note: Flags indicate national team as defined under FIFA eligibility rules; some limited exceptions apply. Players may hold more than one non-FIFA nationality.

No.	Pos.	Nation	Player
—	DF	QAT	Abdullah Alawi (from Qatar SC)
—	DF	QAT	Musa Haroon (from Umm Salal)
—	FW	BRA	Nilmar (from (Spain) Villarreal)

Out: Note: Flags indicate national team as defined under FIFA eligibility rules; some limited exceptions apply. Players may hold more than one non-FIFA nationality.

No.	Pos.	Nation	Player
2	DF	QAT	Waheed Mohammed (to Al-Wakrah)
6	DF	QAT	Meshal Mubarak (to Al-Gharafa)
11	FW	QAT	Fahad Khalfan (to Al Sailiya)
18	DF	QAT	Murad Naji (to Qatar SC)
25	DF	QAT	Mosaab Mahmoud (loan return to Al-Khor)

=== Al Sadd ===
In: Note: Flags indicate national team as defined under FIFA eligibility rules; some limited exceptions apply. Players may hold more than one non-FIFA nationality.

No.	Pos.	Nation	Player
—	FW	ESP	Raúl (from (Germany) FC Schalke 04)

Out: Note: Flags indicate national team as defined under FIFA eligibility rules; some limited exceptions apply. Players may hold more than one non-FIFA nationality.

No.	Pos.	Nation	Player
17	MF	QAT	Hamood Al Yazidi (to Al-Khor)
99	FW	BRA	Leandro (on loan to (Japan) Gamba Osaka)

=== Al Sailiya ===
In: Note: Flags indicate national team as defined under FIFA eligibility rules; some limited exceptions apply. Players may hold more than one non-FIFA nationality.

No.	Pos.	Nation	Player
—	MF	QAT	Mirghani Al Zain (from Al-Gharafa)
—	DF	QAT	Abdulla Madebo (from Al-Wakrah)
—	MF	TUN	Khaled Korbi (from (Tunisia) Espérance)
—	FW	BFA	Moumouni Dagano (from Al-Khor)
—	FW	CIV	Aruna Dindane (from Lekhwiya)
—	FW	QAT	Fahad Khalfan (from Al Rayyan)
—	DF	QAT	Khalid Muftah (from Lekhwiya)}

Out: Note: Flags indicate national team as defined under FIFA eligibility rules; some limited exceptions apply. Players may hold more than one non-FIFA nationality.

No.	Pos.	Nation	Player
—	DF	QAT	Rashid Ali Hassan (to Umm Salal)

=== Al-Wakrah ===
In: Note: Flags indicate national team as defined under FIFA eligibility rules; some limited exceptions apply. Players may hold more than one non-FIFA nationality.

No.	Pos.	Nation	Player
—	DF	QAT	Maaz Yousef (from Al-Arabi)
—	FW	PER	Reimond Manco (from (Peru) León de Huánuco)
—	DF	QAT	Waheed Mohammed (from Al Rayyan)
—	DF	QAT	Hassan Shami (from Al Ahli)
—	DF	QAT	Johar Al Kaabi (from Al-Arabi)
—	FW	FRA	Pierre-Alain Frau (from (France) Caen)
—	FW	BRA	Michel (on loan from (Portugal) Benfica)

Out: Note: Flags indicate national team as defined under FIFA eligibility rules; some limited exceptions apply. Players may hold more than one non-FIFA nationality.

No.	Pos.	Nation	Player
18	DF	QAT	Aden Ali Aden (to Umm Salal)
80	DF	QAT	Abdulla Madebo (to Al Sailiya)
92	MF	BRA	Netinho (to (Brazil) Palmeiras)
10	FW	QAT	Waleed Hamza (to Al Gharafa)
8	MF	NED	Saïd Boutahar (to Umm-Salal)
4	DF	SEN	Baba Keita (to Al-Arabi)

=== El Jaish ===
In: Note: Flags indicate national team as defined under FIFA eligibility rules; some limited exceptions apply. Players may hold more than one non-FIFA nationality.

No.	Pos.	Nation	Player
—	DF	QAT	Mosaab Mahmoud (from Al Rayyan)
—	GK	QAT	Basil Zaidan (from Al Ahli)

Out: Note: Flags indicate national team as defined under FIFA eligibility rules; some limited exceptions apply. Players may hold more than one non-FIFA nationality.

No.	Pos.	Nation	Player

=== Lekhwiya ===
In: Note: Flags indicate national team as defined under FIFA eligibility rules; some limited exceptions apply. Players may hold more than one non-FIFA nationality.

No.	Pos.	Nation	Player
—	DF	EGY	Ahmed Abdelmaqsoud (from Al Ahli)
—	FW	QAT	Adel Ahmed (from Al Ahli)
—	FW	QAT	Sebastián Soria (from Qatar SC)
—	FW	SEN	Issiar Dia (from (Turkey) Fenerbahçe)
—	MF	TUN	Youssef Msakni (from (Tunisia) Espérance Tunis)
—	MF	ALG	Mourad Meghni (from Umm Salal)
—	DF	PRK	Jon Kwang-Ik (from (North Korea) Amrokgang)

Out: Note: Flags indicate national team as defined under FIFA eligibility rules; some limited exceptions apply. Players may hold more than one non-FIFA nationality.

No.	Pos.	Nation	Player
2	DF	QAT	Saleh Mousa (to Al-Khor)
14	FW	CIV	Bakari Koné (to Qatar SC)}
15	FW	CIV	Aruna Dindane (to Al Sailiya)
16	DF	QAT	Khalid Muftah (to Al Sailiya)}
28	FW	BFA	Moumouni Dagano (to Al Sailiya)

=== Qatar SC ===
In: Note: Flags indicate national team as defined under FIFA eligibility rules; some limited exceptions apply. Players may hold more than one non-FIFA nationality.

No.	Pos.	Nation	Player
—	FW	CIV	Bakari Koné (from Lekhwiya)
—	DF	QAT	Murad Naji (from Al Rayyan)
—	DF	IRN	Hadi Aghili (from Al-Arabi)

Out: Note: Flags indicate national team as defined under FIFA eligibility rules; some limited exceptions apply. Players may hold more than one non-FIFA nationality.

No.	Pos.	Nation	Player
3	DF	QAT	Abdullah Alawi (to Al Rayyan)
23	FW	QAT	Sebastián Soria (to Lekhwiya)

=== Umm Salal ===
In: Note: Flags indicate national team as defined under FIFA eligibility rules; some limited exceptions apply. Players may hold more than one non-FIFA nationality.

No.	Pos.	Nation	Player
—	MF	QAT	Mohammed Yasser (from Al-Gharafa)
—	DF	QAT	Rashid Ali Hassan (from Al Sailiya)
—	DF	QAT	Walid Mohiuddin (from Al-Arabi)
—	FW	IRQ	Yasser Kadhim (from Al-Mu'aidar)
—	DF	MAR	Otmane El Assas (on loan from Al-Gharafa)
—	DF	QAT	Aden Ali Aden (from Al-Wakrah)
—	DF	AUS	Saša Ognenovski (from (South Korea) Seongnam Ilhwa Chunma)
—	MF	NED	Saïd Boutahar (from Al-Wakrah)
—	DF	QAT	Saeed El Hadj (from Al Gharrafa)

Out: Note: Flags indicate national team as defined under FIFA eligibility rules; some limited exceptions apply. Players may hold more than one non-FIFA nationality.

No.	Pos.	Nation	Player
20	MF	QAT	Jawad Ahnash (on loan to Al-Gharafa)
23	MF	ALG	Mourad Meghni (to Lekwhyia)
24	DF	QAT	Musa Haroon (to Al Rayyan)
