= Qatari football clubs in Asian competitions =

The Qatar Stars League clubs in the AFC Champions League.This details the participation and performances in the competition since its based at 2002 as a result of the merger between the Asian Club Championship, the Asian Cup Winners' Cup and the Asian Super Cup.

== Participations ==
- Q : Qualified, PO = Play-off stage, GS : Group Stage, LS : League Stage, R16 : Round of 16, QF : Quarterfinals, SF : Semifinals, RU : Runners-Up, W : Winners

Participations
Team	Qualified	2003	2004	2005	2006	2007	2008	2009	2010	2011	2012	2013	2014	2015	2016	2017	2018	2019	2020	2021	2022	2023–24	2024–25	2025–26
(Qatar) Al Sadd	20 Times	GS	GS	QF	GS	GS	GS		GS	W			QF	R16	PO	PO	SF	SF	R16	GS	GS	GS	QF	TBD
(Qatar) Al Rayyan	13 Times			GS		GS				GS	GS	GS	GS			GS	GS	GS	PO	GS	R16		R16	
(Qatar) Al-Duhail	13 Times										GS	QF	GS	QF	R16	R16	QF	R16	GS	GS	SF	GS		TBD
(Qatar) Al Gharafa	13 Times				GS		GS	GS	QF	GS	GS	R16					GS	PO		PO	GS		LS	TBD
(Qatar) El Jaish SC	5 Times											R16	GS	PO	SF	PO								
(Qatar) Al-Arabi	2 Times										GS											PO		
Qatar SC	1 Time		GS																					
(Qatar) Umm Salal SC	1 Time							SF																
(Qatar) Al-Sailiya SC	1 Time																		PO					
(Qatar) Al-Wakrah SC	1 Time																					PO		

As of 5 February 2026

== Overall statistics ==
#	Team	Pld	W	D	L	GF	GA	GD	Pts
1	Al Sadd	51	22	11	18	75	61	+14	76
2	Al Gharafa	31	11	1	16	43	51	−8	37
3	Umm Salal SC	11	4	3	4	11	20	−9	15
4	Al Rayyan	18	3	4	11	7	19	−12	4
5	Qatar SC	4	0	3	1	3	4	−1	3

== Statistics by season ==
Season	Pld	W	D	L	GF	GA	GD	Pts
2003	3	1	0	2	4	5	−1	3
2004	8	1	5	2	4	5	−1	8
2005	14	6	1	7	15	19	−4	19
2006	12	6	1	5	24	19	+5	19
2007	12	1	3	8	9	21	−12	6
2008	12	1	5	6	9	16	−7	8
2009	15	5	3	7	17	27	−10	18
2010	15	8	3	4	28	23	+5	27
2011	26	11	6	9	34	27	+7	39
Total	117	40	27	50	144	162	-18	147

== Finals ==
Performance by clubs
Club	Winners	Runners-up	Years won	Years runners-up
Al Sadd	2	0	1988–89 ، 2011	
Al-Arabi	0	1		1994–95

== Statistics by club ==
=== Al Gharafa ===
Al Gharafa Statistics
Team	GP	W	D	L	GF	GA	GD
(Qatar) Al Gharafa	31	11	1	16	43	51	−8

Al Gharafa Results
Season	Round	Results	Team 2	Venue	Scorer(s)
March 8, 2006	Group Round	0 – 2	(Iran) Saba BatteryC	Doha, Qatar	
March 22, 2006	Group Round	0 – 2	(United Arab Emirates) Al-Wahda	Abu Dhabi, United Arab Emirates	
April 12, 2006	Group Round	4 – 0	(Syria) Al-Karamah	Doha, Qatar	A'ala Hubail (2), Lawrence Quaye, Ismaiel Ali
April 26, 2006	Group Round	1 – 3	(Syria) Al-Karamah	Homs, Syria	Lawrence Quaye
May 3, 2006	Group Round	1 – 4	(Iran) Saba BatteryC	Tehran, Iran	Abdulla Al-Mazroa
May 17, 2006	Group Round	5 – 3	(United Arab Emirates) Al-Wahda	Doha, Qatar	A'ala Hubail (3), Fahad Al Shammari, Sergio Ricardo
March 12, 2008	Group Round	1 – 1	(Iraq) Arbil	Zarqa, Iraq	Araújo
March 19, 2008	Group Round	2 – 2	(Uzbekistan) Pakhtakor	Doha, Qatar	Younis Mahmoud, Araújo
April 9, 2008	Group Round	0 – 1	Al Qadisiya Kuwait	Kuwait City, Kuwait	
April 23, 2008	Group Round	0 – 1	Al Qadisiya Kuwait	Doha, Qatar	
May 7, 2008	Group Round	0 – 1	(Iraq) Arbil	Doha, Qatar	
May 21, 2008	Group Round	0 – 2	(Uzbekistan) Pakhtakor	Tashkent, Uzbekistan	
March 10, 2009	Group Round	1 – 3	(Saudi Arabia) Al-Shabab	Doha, Qatar	Araújo
March 17, 2009	Group Round	2 – 0	(United Arab Emirates) Sharjah	Sharjah, United Arab Emirates	Nasser Kamil, Araújo
April 8, 2009	Group Round	1 – 3	(Iran) Persepolis	Tehran, Iran	Fernandão
April 21, 2009	Group Round	5 – 1	(Iran) Persepolis	Doha, Qatar	Fernandão, Araújo (3), Nashat Akram
May 6, 2009	Group Round	0 – 1	(Saudi Arabia) Al-Shabab	Riyadh, Saudi Arabia	
February 23, 2010	Group Round	2 – 1	(United Arab Emirates) Al-Jazira	Abu Dhabi, United Arab Emirates	Otmane El Assas, Younis Mahmoud
March 9, 2010	Group Round	3 – 2	(Saudi Arabia) Al-Ahli	Doha, Qatar	Mirghani Al Zain, Saad Al-Shammari, Araújo
March 23, 2010	Group Round	0 – 3	(Iran) Esteghlal	Tehran, Iran	
March 31, 2010	Group Round	1 – 1	(Iran) Esteghlal	Doha, Qatar	Younis Mahmoud
April 14, 2010	Group Round	4 – 2	(United Arab Emirates) Al-Jazira	Doha, Qatar	Araújo (3), Otmane El Assas
April 28, 2010	Group Round	1 – 0	(Saudi Arabia) Al-Ahli	Jeddah, Saudi Arabia	Naser Kamil
May 11, 2010	Round of 16	1 – 0	(Uzbekistan) Pakhtakor	Doha, Qatar	Araújo
September 15, 2010	Quarterfinal	'0 – 3	(Saudi Arabia) Al-Hilal	Riyadh, Saudi Arabia	
September 22, 2010	Quarterfinal	'4 – 2	(Saudi Arabia) Al-Hilal	Doha, Qatar	Mirghani Al Zain, Younis Mahmoud (2), Otmane El Assas
March 1, 2011	Group Round	0 – 0	(United Arab Emirates) Al-Jazira	Abu Dhabi, United Arab Emirates	
March 15, 2011	Group Round	0 – 1	(Saudi Arabia) Al-Hilal	Doha, Qatar	
April 5, 2011	Group Round	0 – 2	(Iran) Sepahan	Isfahan, Iran	
April 29, 2011	Group Round	1 – 0	(Iran) Sepahan	Doha, Qatar	Amara Diané
May 4, 2011	Group Round	5 – 2	(United Arab Emirates) Al-Jazira	Doha, Qatar	Younis Mahmoud (3), Amara Diané, Mirghani Al Zain
May 11, 2011	Group Round	0 – 2	(Saudi Arabia) Al-Hilal	Riyadh, Saudi Arabia	

=== Al Rayyan ===
Al Rayyan Statistics
Team	GP	W	D	L	GF	GA	GD
(Qatar) Al Rayyan	18	3	4	11	7	19	−12

Al Rayyan Results
Season	Round	Results	Team 2	Venue	Scorer(s)
March 8, 2005	Group Round	1 – 2	(Iran) PAS	Tehran, Iran	Frank de Boer
March 16, 2005	Group Round	2 – 1	(Kuwait) Al Salmiya	Al Rayyan, Qatar	Nasser Kamil, Frank de Boer
April 6, 2005	Group Round	2 – 0	(Iraq) Al-Shorta	Al Rayyan, Qatar	Ali bin Rabiah, Sonny Anderson
April 19, 2005	Group Round	0 – 0	(Iraq) Al-Shorta	Baghdad, Iraq	
May 11, 2005	Group Round	1 – 2	(Iran) PAS	Al Rayyan, Qatar	Waleed Jassem
May 25, 2005	Group Round	0 – 2	(Kuwait) Al Salmiya	Kuwait City, Kuwait	
March 7, 2007	Group Round	0 – 1	(United Arab Emirates) Al-Wahda	Al Rayyan, Qatar	
March 21, 2007	Group Round	0 – 0	(Iraq) Al-Zawraa	Al Rayyan, Qatar	
April 11, 2007	Group Round	1 – 1	(Kuwait) Al-Arabi	Kuwait City, Kuwait	Adel Lamy
April 25, 2007	Group Round	1 – 2	(Kuwait) Al-Arabi	Al Rayyan, Qatar	Thiago Ribeiro
May 9, 2007	Group Round	0 – 3	(United Arab Emirates) Al-Wahda	Abu Dhabi, United Arab Emirates	
May 23, 2007	Group Round	1 – 3	(Iraq) Al-Zawraa	Doha, Qatar	Saoud Khames
March 2, 2011	Group Round	1 – 1	(Saudi Arabia) Al-Shabab	Al Rayyan, Qatar	Itamar
March 16, 2011	Group Round	0 – 2	(United Arab Emirates) Emirates	Ras al-Khaimah, United Arab Emirates	
April 6, 2011	Group Round	1 – 3	(Iran) Zob Ahan	Isfahan, Iran	Jaralla Al Marri
April 19, 2011	Group Round	0 – 1	(Iran) Zob Ahan	Al Rayyan, Qatar	
May 3, 2011	Group Round	0 – 1	(Saudi Arabia) Al-Shabab	Riyadh, Saudi Arabia	
May 10, 2011	Group Round	2 – 0	(United Arab Emirates) Emirates	Al Rayyan, Qatar	Abdul Ghafoor Murad, Ahmed Alaaeldin

=== Qatar SC ===
Qatar SC Statistics
Team	GP	W	D	L	GF	GA	GD
Qatar SC	4	0	3	1	3	4	−1

Qatar SC Results
Season	Round	Results	Team 2	Venue	Scorer(s)
February 25, 2004	Group Round	0 – 1	(Uzbekistan) Pakhtakor	Tashkent, Uzbekistan	
April 6, 2004	Group Round	3 – 3	(Iran) Zob Ahan	Isfahan, Iran	Meshal Mubarak (2), Claudio Caniggia
April 21, 2004	Group Round	0 – 0	(Iran) Zob Ahan	Doha, Qatar	
May 19, 2004	Group Round	0 – 0	(Uzbekistan) Pakhtakor	Doha, Qatar	
