= 2010 Qatar Crown Prince Cup =

2010 Crown Prince Cup
Tournament details
- Host country: Qatar
- Dates: 18–24 April
- Teams: 4

Final positions
- Champions: Al-Gharrafa (2nd title)

Tournament statistics
- Top scorer(s): Clemerson (3 goals)

The 2010 Qatar Crown Prince Cup was the 16th edition of the cup tournament in men's football (soccer). It is played by the top-4 teams of the Qatar Stars League after the end of each season.

== 2010 Participants ==
- Al-Gharrafa : 2009–10 Qatar Stars League Champion
- Al-Sadd : 2009–10 Qatar Stars League Runner-up
- Al-Arabi : 2009–10 Qatar Stars League 3rd Place
- Qatar SC : 2009–10 Qatar Stars League 4th Place

== Bracket ==
Semi-finals
2010-04-18 – Doha
(Qatar) Al-Arabi	1
(Qatar) Al-Sadd	0
2010-04-19 – Doha
Qatar SC	1
(Qatar) Al-Gharrafa	2

Final
2010-04-24 – Doha
(Qatar) Al-Arabi	0
(Qatar) Al-Gharrafa	5

== Match details ==
=== Semi-finals ===
18 April 2010

Al-Sadd	0–1	Al-Arabi
		Cabore 64'

Jassim Bin Hamad Stadium, Doha

19 April 2010

Al-Gharrafa	2–1	Qatar SC
Mirghani Al Zain 15'; Clemerson 30'		Sebastián Soria 4'

Jassim Bin Hamad Stadium, Doha

=== Final ===
24 April 2010

Al-Arabi	0–5	Al-Gharrafa
		Clemerson 3', 49'; Younis Mahmoud 15', 44'; Saad Al Shammari 90'

Jassim Bin Hamad Stadium, Doha
Attendance: 12,896

Qatar Crown Prince Cup
2010 Winners

Al-Gharrafa
2nd Title
