= 2007–08 Qatar Stars League =

44th season of top-tier football league in Qatar

Qatar Stars League
- Season: 2007–08
- Champions: Al-Gharafa
- Relegated: Al-Shamal
- AFC Champions League: Al-Gharafa; Umm Salal
- Gulf Club Champions Cup: Al-Khor; Umm Salal
- Top goalscorer: (Brazil) Clemerson (27 goals)

Statistics of Qatar Stars League for the 2007–08 season.

== Overview ==
It was contested by 10 teams, and Al-Gharafa won the championship.

== Personnel ==
Note: Flags indicate national team as has been defined under FIFA eligibility rules. Players may hold more than one non-FIFA nationality.

Team	Manager
Al-Arabi	(Portugal) José Romão
Al-Gharafa	(Brazil) Marcos Paquetá
Al-Khor	(Spain) Ladislas Lozano
Al-Rayyan	(Brazil) Paulo Autuori
Al Sadd	(Brazil) Émerson Leão
Al-Sailiya	(Brazil) José Paulo
Al-Shamal	(Brazil) Adilson Luís
Al-Wakrah	(Croatia) Goran Miscevic
Qatar SC	(Bosnia and Herzegovina) Džemaludin Mušović
Umm Salal	(France) Laurent Banide

== Foreign players ==
Club	Player 1	Player 2	Player 3	Player 4	Player 5	AFC player	Former players
Al-Arabi	(Argentina) Leonardo Pisculichi	(Bolivia) Juan Carlos Arce	(Brazil) Roger	(France) Matt Moussilou	(Mali) Souleymane Keïta	(Bahrain) Salman Isa	(Iran) Hadi Shakouri (Iraq) Bassim Abbas
Al-Gharafa	(Algeria) Samir Amirèche	(Brazil) Clemerson	(Iraq) Younis Mahmoud	(Morocco) Abdelhaq Ait Laarif	(Morocco) Otmane El Assas	(Oman) Fawzi Bashir	(Algeria) Ahmed Madouni
Al-Khor	(Algeria) Mehdi Méniri	(Brazil) Da Silva	(Brazil) Fabrício Souza	(Brazil) Neguette	(Brazil) Rodrigo Gral	(Bahrain) Sayed Mohamed Adnan	(Bahrain) Ebrahim Al Mishkhas (Iraq) Hawar Mulla Mohammed
Al-Rayyan	(Brazil) Demetrius Ferreira	(Brazil) Fumagalli	(Brazil) Thiago Ribeiro	(Brazil) Wílton Figueiredo	(Morocco) Youssef Mokhtari	(Saudi Arabia) Turky Al-Thagafi	(Bahrain) Hussain Ali Baba (Iraq) Jassim Ghulam Al-Hamd (Senegal) Moussa N'Diaye
Al Sadd	(Brazil) Felipe	(Cameroon) Jean Paul Yontcha	(Ecuador) Carlos Tenorio	(Oman) Khalifa Ayil Al-Noufali		(Oman) Mohammed Rabia Al-Noobi	(Argentina) Mauro Zárate (Brazil) Emerson Sheik
Al-Sailiya	(Brazil) William	(Burkina Faso) Abdoulaye Cissé	(Cape Verde) Nando	(Egypt) Wael Gomaa	(France) José-Karl Pierre-Fanfan	(Oman) Ahmed Kano	(Brazil) Alexandre (Brazil) Gabriel Schacht (Brazil) Will (Oman) Badar Al-Maimani
Al-Shamal	(Brazil) Alexandre	(Cape Verde) Caló	(Cape Verde) Zé Piguita	(Kuwait) Adel Humoud	(Oman) Ahmed Hadid Al-Mukhaini	(Oman) Sultan Al-Touqi	(Brazil) Evando (Brazil) Paulo Cesar (Netherlands) Ronald de Boer
Al-Wakrah	(France) Alain Goma	(Iraq) Haider Obeid	(Morocco) Adil Ramzi	(Morocco) Ali Boussaboun	(Morocco) Anouar Diba	(Iraq) Karrar Jassim	(Libya) Jehad Muntasser
Qatar SC	(Cameroon) Bill Tchato	(Cameroon) Eric Djemba-Djemba	(Iran) Ali Karimi	(Morocco) Talal El Karkouri	(Oman) Amad Al-Hosni	(United Arab Emirates) Fahed Masoud	(Mali) Mamadou Diallo
Umm Salal	(Iraq) Bassim Abbas	(Morocco) Aziz Ben Askar	(Morocco) Yazid Kaïssi	(Portugal) Zeferino	(Senegal) Moussa N'Diaye	(Bahrain) Hussain Ali Baba	(Algeria) Hakim Saci (Brazil) Fábio César (France) Sabri Lamouchi (Morocco) Rachid Rokki (Oman) Ismail Al-Ajmi

== League standings ==
Pos	Team	Pld	W	D	L	GF	GA	GD	Pts
1	Al-Gharafa	27	20	2	5	72	35	+37	62
2	Al Sadd	27	16	5	6	54	38	+16	53
3	Umm Salal	27	16	2	9	45	36	+9	50
4	Qatar SC	27	14	4	9	53	38	+15	46
5	Al-Rayyan	27	12	3	12	39	42	−3	39
6	Al-Arabi	27	8	9	10	37	35	+2	33
7	Al-Khor	27	8	4	15	35	48	−13	28
8	Al-Sailiya	27	7	6	14	33	46	−13	27
9	Al-Wakrah	27	7	6	14	41	67	−26	27
10	Al-Shamal	27	5	3	19	27	51	−24	18

Source: RSSSF

== Top goalscorers ==
Source: goalzz.com

27 goals

- (Brazil) Clemerson (Al-Gharafa)

18 goals

- (Argentina) Leonardo Pisculichi (Al-Arabi)

17 goals

- Sebastián Soria (Qatar SC)

16 goals

- (Iraq) Younis Mahmoud (Al-Gharafa)

15 goals

- (Morocco) Adil Ramzi (Al-Wakrah)
- (Burkina Faso) Abdoulaye Cissé (Al-Sailiya)

13 goals

- (Ecuador) Carlos Tenorio (Al Sadd)
- (Morocco) Ali Boussaboun (Al-Wakrah)
