= 2009–10 Qatar Stars League =

46th season of top-tier football league in Qatar

Qatar Stars League
- Season: 2009–2010
- Champions: Al-Gharafa
- Relegated: Al-Shamal
- AFC Champions League: Al-Gharafa; Al-Rayyan; Al Sadd
- Top goalscorer: (Brazil) Caboré (Iraq) Younis Mahmoud (21 goals each)

The 2009–10 Qatar Stars League season was the 37th edition of top-level football championship in Qatar, which started in September 2009 and ended in April 2010.

== League expansion ==
Qatar Stars League slowly expanded since the turn of the decade, moving from 9 to 10 clubs and then latest setup of 12 clubs for this season campaign.

There are 2 divisions in the Qatari football structure and the league has previously seen one club promoted and relegated each year except in 'expansion' years.

It was announced on 15 April 2009 that no clubs would be relegated from the top flight in the last season, due to expansion reasons. The announcement was made with only one game remaining.

The expansion benefitted relegated Al Kharaitiyat, who would stay in the first division, and would be joined by two second division clubs Al Ahli and Al-Shamal, bringing the number up to 12.

Sheikh Hamad bin Khalifa Al Thani said the expansion would help in improving league action, which was also curtailed to two rounds instead of the prevailing system where the teams played each other three times.

== Teams ==
Locations of teams in the 2009-10 Qatari League

Club	City/Town	Stadium	Head coach
Al Ahli	Doha	Hamad bin Khalifa Stadium	(Netherlands) Erik van der Meer
Al-Arabi	Doha	Grand Hamad Stadium	(Germany) Uli Stielike
Al-Gharafa	Al Gharrafa	Thani bin Jassim Stadium	(Brazil) Caio Júnior
Al Kharaitiyat	Al Kharaitiyat	Ahmad bin Ali Stadium	(France) Bernard Simondi
Al-Khor	Al Khor	Al-Khor SC Stadium	(France) Bertrand Marchand
Al-Rayyan	Al Rayyan	Ahmad bin Ali Stadium	(Brazil) Paulo Autuori
Al Sadd	Doha	Jassim bin Hamad Stadium	(Romania) Cosmin Olăroiu
Al-Sailiya	Al Sailiya	Grand Hamad Stadium	(Bosnia and Herzegovina) Džemal Hadžiabdić
Al-Shamal	Madinat ash Shamal	Al-Shamal SC Stadium	(France) Alain Michel
Al-Wakrah	Al Wakrah	Al Janoub Stadium	(Morocco) Mustapha Madih
Qatar SC	Doha	Suheim bin Hamad Stadium	(Brazil) Sebastião Lazaroni
Umm Salal	Umm Salal	Thani bin Jassim Stadium	(Netherlands) Henk ten Cate

=== Managerial changes ===
Team	Outgoing manager	Reason of departure	Replaced by	Date
Al-Gharafa	(Brazil) Marcos Paquetá	Contract not renewed	(Brazil) Caio Júnior	July 2009
Al Ahli	(Portugal) Carlos Manuel	Contract not renewed	(Brazil) Heron Ferreira	July 2009
Al-Rayyan	(Brazil) Paulo Autuori	Contract not renewed	(Brazil) Marcos Paquetá	July 2009
Al Ahli	(Brazil) Heron Ferreira	Sacked	(Brazil) Ziza	November 2009
Al-Rayyan	(Brazil) Marcos Paquetá	Sacked	(Brazil) Paulo Autuori	November 2009
Al-Shamal	(Brazil) Robertinho	Sacked	(France) Alain Michel	November 2009
Al Ahli	(Brazil) Ziza	Sacked	(Netherlands) Erik van der Meer	January 2010
Umm Salal	(France) Gérard Gili	Sacked	(Netherlands) Henk ten Cate	March 2010

=== Foreign players ===
Club	Player 1	Player 2	Player 3	AFC player	Former players
Al Ahli	(Brazil) Júlio César	(Ivory Coast) Olivier Tia	(Mali) Mamadou Diakité	(Oman) Khalifa Ayil Al-Noufali	(Brazil) Fernando (Iran) Rahman Rezaei (Senegal) Lamine Diatta
Al-Arabi	(Argentina) Leonardo Pisculichi	(Brazil) Caboré	(Brazil) Daniel Carvalho	(Bahrain) Salman Isa	(Brazil) Kim (Croatia) Igor Novaković
Al-Gharafa	(Brazil) Clemerson	(Brazil) Juninho Pernambucano	(Morocco) Otmane El Assas	(Iraq) Younis Mahmoud	
Al Kharaitiyat	(Burkina Faso) Yahia Kébé	(Morocco) Youness Mankari	(Mozambique) Dario Khan	(Iraq) Alaa Abdul-Zahra	(Mali) Souleymane Keïta
Al-Khor	(Bahrain) Sayed Mohamed Adnan	(Burkina Faso) Abdoulaye Cissé	(Burkina Faso) Moumouni Dagano	(Iraq) Salam Shaker	(Algeria) Rafik Saïfi (Cameroon) Bill Tchato (Cameroon) Moussa Pokong
Al-Rayyan	(Brazil) Afonso Alves	(Brazil) Marcelo Tavares	(Ivory Coast) Amara Diané	(Oman) Amad Al-Hosni	(Australia) Danny Allsopp (Guinea) Pascal Feindouno
Al Sadd	(Brazil) Felipe	(Brazil) Leandro	(Ghana) Agyemang Opoku	(Oman) Mohammed Rabia Al-Noobi	(Brazil) Afonso Alves (Ghana) Quincy Owusu-Abeyie
Al-Shamal	(Bahrain) Mahmood Abdulrahman	(Cameroon) Bong Bertrand	(Tunisia) Yamen Ben Zekry	(Kuwait) Adel Humoud	(Brazil) Lima (Brazil) Zé Adriano (Cape Verde) Caló (Iraq) Samer Saeed (Netherlands) Elbekay Bouchiba (Tunisia) Ali Ben Abdelkader
Al-Sailiya	(Brazil) Dennis Souza	(Iraq) Mustafa Karim	(Senegal) Moustapha Dabo	(Iraq) Samer Saeed	(Brazil) Roger (Cameroon) Jean-Emmanuel Effa Owona (United Arab Emirates) Lamjed Chehoudi
Al-Wakrah	(Belgium) Tom Caluwé	(Morocco) Adil Ramzi	(Morocco) Younès Hawassi	(Iraq) Ali Rehema	
Qatar SC	(Brazil) Marcinho	(Morocco) Talal El Karkouri	(Morocco) Youssef Safri	(Iraq) Qusay Munir	(Brazil) Thiago Oliveira (Iraq) Ali Hasan Kamal
Umm Salal	(Brazil) Davi	(Brazil) Magno Alves	(Morocco) Aziz Ben Askar	(Bahrain) Mohamed Husain	(Senegal) Moussa N'Diaye

== Final league table ==
Pos	Team	Pld	W	D	L	GF	GA	GD	Pts	Qualification or relegation
1	Al-Gharafa	22	16	5	1	55	16	+39	53	2011 AFC Champions League group stage and 2010 Qatar Crown Prince Cup
2	Al Sadd	22	15	5	2	55	22	+33	50	2011 AFC Champions League qualifying play-off and 2010 Qatar Crown Prince Cup
3	Al-Arabi	22	12	4	6	52	30	+22	40	2010 Qatar Crown Prince Cup and 2011 GCC Champions League
4	Qatar SC	22	11	5	6	32	23	+9	38	2010 Qatar Crown Prince Cup
5	Al-Rayyan	22	11	4	7	41	30	+11	37	2011 AFC Champions League group stage (Note: Qualified by winning the 2010 Emir of Qatar Cup.)
6	Al Kharaitiyat	22	8	5	9	23	36	−13	29	2011 GCC Champions League
7	Umm Salal	22	7	7	8	27	30	−3	28	
8	Al-Wakrah	22	8	3	11	44	44	0	27	
9	Al-Khor	22	5	5	12	21	30	−9	20	
10	Al Ahli	22	6	2	14	31	53	−22	20	
11	Al-Sailiya	22	4	7	11	16	28	−12	19	Promotion/relegation playoff
12	Al-Shamal (R)	22	2	2	18	17	72	−55	8	Relegation

Updated to match(es) played on 4 April 2010. Source: RSSSF
Rules for classification: 1) points; 2) goal difference; 3) number of goals scored.
(R) Relegated
Notes:
- Al-Sailiya defeated Mesaimeer 2-0 in the end of season relegation playoff to stay in the top flight

Qatar Stars League
2009–10 winners

7th title

== Fixtures and results ==
Home \ Away	SAD	RAY	GHA	QSC	UMM	KHO	WAK	KHA	ARA	SAI	SHA	AHL
Al Sadd		4–3	1–1	3–0	5–0	2–1	0–0	1–1	3–3	2–1	5–1	3–0
Al-Rayyan	1–4		0–3	1–3	0–0	2–1	5–2	0–1	3–1	0–0	3–0	2–0
Al-Gharafa	4–1	4–1		0–0	1–0	4–1	2–3	2–0	2–1	1–0	8–1	4–0
Qatar SC	1–1	5–2	3–3		0–0	2–0	1–0	3–1	1–3	3–0	0–3	2–0
Umm Salal	1–0	1–1	1–3	0–1		1–0	2–2	3–3	1–3	1–0	4–1	3–2
Al-Khor	0–2		0–1		0–1		1–0	2–0	0–0	1–1	0–1	1–1
Al-Wakrah	1–3	0–4	1–4	0–1	3–2	4–1		1–1	0–1	1–2	7–0	5–2
Al Kharaitiyat	0–2	0–1	0–4	0–2		0–1	4–2		0–6	1–1	2–1	2–1
Al-Arabi	0–2	0–5	1–1	2–3	2–1	2–1	3–2	1–2		2–2	6–2	1–2
Al-Sailiya	1–3	0–2	0–1	1–0	0–0	1–2	0–3	0–0	0–2		1–1	0–1
Al-Shamal	0–2	0–3	1–2	0–3	1–1	1–5	1–2	0–1	0–7	0–3		
Al Ahli	2–6	1–2	0–0	1–0	1–4	3–2	4–5	2–3	0–4	1–2	6–2	

Updated to match(es) played on 4 April 2010. Source: QFA Qatar Football Association - Home
Legend: Blue = home team win; Yellow = draw; Red = away team win.

== Top scorers ==
21 goals

- (Brazil) Caboré (Al-Arabi)
- (Iraq) Younis Mahmoud (Al-Gharafa)

20 goals

- (Brazil) Leandro (Al Sadd)

17 goals

- (Morocco) Adil Ramzi (Al-Wakrah)

15 goals

- (Brazil) Clemerson (Al-Gharafa)
- Sebastian Soria (Qatar SC)

11 goals

- (Brazil) Magno Alves (Umm Salal)

10 goals

- (Brazil) Afonso Alves (Al Sadd and Al-Rayyan)
- (Iraq) Alaa Abdul-Zahra (Al Kharaitiyat)

9 goals

- (Brazil) Júlio César (Al Ahli)
