= Mohammed Yasser =

Qatari footballer (born 1982)

Personal information
- Full name: Mohammed Yasser Mohamadi
- Date of birth: October 10, 1982 (age 44)
- Height: 1.74 m (5 ft 9 in)
- Position: Midfielder

Senior career*
Years	Team	Apps	(Gls)
1999–2001	Al-Khor	15	(2)
2001–2004	Al-Rayyan	36	(3)
2004–2008	Qatar SC	84	(1)
2008–2010	Al-Rayyan	52	(1)
2010–2011	Al-Khor	17	(1)
2011–2012	Al-Gharafa	12	(2)
2012–2013	Umm Salal	22	(1)
2013–2014	Al-Gharafa		
2014– 2016	Al Kharaitiyat SC		
2016–2017	Muaither		

International career
2001–2010	Qatar	14	(1)
- * Club domestic league appearances and goals

Mohammed Yasser Mohamadi (born October 10, 1982) is a Qatari former footballer who was a midfielder. He was a member of the Qatar national football team.

His older brother Hussein Yasser, also a Qatari international, has had stints playing in Europe, notably with Manchester City and Manchester United.
