= René Meulensteen =

Dutch football manager (born 1964)

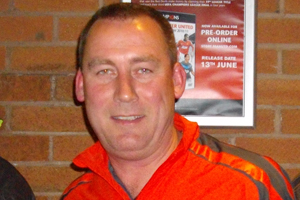
- Meulensteen in 2011

Personal information
- Full name: Reinhard Jozef Petrus Meulensteen
- Date of birth: 25 March 1964 (age 62)
- Place of birth: Beugen, Netherlands
- Position: Midfielder

Team information
- Current team: Iraq (assistant coach)

Youth career
- VIOS '38

Senior career*
Years	Team	Apps	(Gls)
1982–1983	VIOS '38		
1983–1988	RKVV Volharding		
1988–1989	VIOS '38		
1989–1991	De Treffers		
1991–1993	NEC		

Managerial career
- 1993–1999: Qatar U18
- 1999–2000: Al-Ittihad
- 2000–2001: Al-Sadd
- 2006–2007: Brøndby
- 2013: Anzhi Makhachkala
- 2013–2014: Fulham
- 2016–2017: Maccabi Haifa
- 2017–2018: Kerala Blasters
- * Club domestic league appearances and goals

Reinhard Jozef Petrus "René" Meulensteen (born 25 March 1964) is a Dutch professional football manager and former player who is the current Director of Football Methodology at Stockport County.

Meulensteen spent the early parts of his career working in the Netherlands before taking up managerial roles with the Qatar youth teams, as well as clubs Al-Ittihad and Al-Sadd. He then spent 12 years, split either side of a year stint at Brøndby, with Manchester United in various non-managerial capacities. Following his departure from the club in 2013, Meulensteen was in charge for short spells at Anzhi Makhachkala, Fulham, Maccabi Haifa and Kerala Blasters.

== Managerial career ==
=== Early career ===
While still playing, Meulensteen became a youth coach at NEC.

In June 2006, he signed a three-year contract with Danish club Brøndby to become manager of the club, but resigned after six months.

On 18 January 2007, Meulensteen rejoined Manchester United as technical skills development coach mainly to work with the first team. After the departure in July 2008 of their assistant manager, Carlos Queiroz to Portugal as their national team manager, Meulensteen took over as first team coach, with Mike Phelan being promoted to assistant manager. Both assumed their new roles on 13 August 2008.

During his time as first-team coach, he helped Sir Alex Ferguson secure the Premier League title in 2008–09, 2010–11 and 2012–13; the Community Shield in 2008, 2010, 2011, the League Cup in 2008–09 and 2009–10; the UEFA Champions League in 2007–08 and FIFA Club World Cup in 2008.

Manchester United confirmed his departure from the club on 26 June 2013, after incoming manager David Moyes decided to bring in his own coaching team.

On 1 July 2013, Meulensteen signed a contract with Anzhi Makhachkala, joining Guus Hiddink as an assistant coach. Hiddink left Anzhi after only two games into the 2013–14 Russian Premier League season, allowing Meulensteen to step up to head coach. After 16 days in charge, Meulensteen was sacked and replaced by Gadzhi Gadzhiyev.

=== Fulham ===
Meulensteen returned to England in November 2013 to take up a coaching position under Martin Jol at Fulham. Less than three weeks later, Jol was sacked by Fulham after five consecutive league defeats, with Meulensteen taking over as manager. His first match as Fulham manager was a 2–1 loss to Tottenham Hotspur on 4 December, where Ashkan Dejagah scored the only goal for Meulensteen's side. Fulham won their first match under Meulensteen days later on 8 December, beating Aston Villa 2–0 with goals from Steve Sidwell and Dimitar Berbatov. On 14 February 2014, Fulham hired Felix Magath to replace Meulensteen as manager, sacking Meulensteen four days later.

In November 2014, he was hired as a consultant by the Philadelphia Union from Major League Soccer.

=== Maccabi Haifa ===
On 9 August 2016, Meulensteen was presented as head coach by Maccabi Haifa from Israeli Premier League. His appointment lasted just over six months, and then resigned as head coach on 13 February 2017.

=== Kerala Blasters ===
On 14 July 2017, Meulensteen was appointed as head coach of Indian Super League side Kerala Blasters. The club parted ways with Meulensteen after poor start of the season. He resigned as head coach on 2 January 2018.

=== Australia ===
Meulensteen served as an assistant coach with Australia from 2018 to 2024.

== Administrative career ==
On 3 August 2026, Meulensteen was appointed as Stockport County's inaugural Director of Football Methodology, a newly created role. The club said he would oversee the implementation of a unified football philosophy across all levels, from the academy to the first team.

== Personal life ==
Meulensteen's daughter Pien is a television presenter and reporter in the UK, whilst his son Melle is also a footballer.

== Honours ==
=== Manager ===
Al-Ittihad

- Qatar Crown Prince Cup: 2000
- Arab Cup Winners' Cup: 1999

Al-Sadd

- Emir of Qatar Cup: 2000–01

Man United Reserves

- Premier Reserve League: 2005–06
- PRL Northern Division: 2005–06
- Manchester Senior Cup: 2005–06
