= Léo Borges =

Léo Borges may refer to:

- Léo Borges (footballer, born 1985), Brazilian football midfielder
- Léo Borges (footballer, born 2001), Brazilian football left-back for Porto B
