= Mohammed Attiyah (footballer, born 1989) =

Qatari footballer

Personal information
- Full name: Mohammed Attiyah Mahmoud Abdulateef
- Date of birth: 5 May 1989 (age 37)
- Position: Midfielder

Senior career*
| Years | Team | Apps | (Gls) |
| 2010–2018 | Muaither | | |
- * Club domestic league appearances and goals

Mohammed Attiyah (Arabic: محمد عطية) (born 5 May 1989) is a Qatari footballer.
