= Bela Rahma =

- Genre: Drama
- Created by: Zainab Al Askari
- Screenplay by: Asshoman Tawfik
- Directed by: Mohammed Salman
- Starring: Zainab Al Askari; Miriam Al-Saleh; Abeer Al-Jundi; Ali Jumaa; Ibrahim Al-Zageli; Saad Al-Buanen; Hibba Al-Dedri
- Country of origin: Bahrain
- Original language: Arabic
- No. of episodes: 31

Production
- Executive producer: Bint El-Mamlaka
- Producer: Zainab Al Askari
- Production locations: Manama, Bahrain
- Running time: 43 minutes (approx.)
- Production company: (Bint El-Mamlaka)

Original release
- Network: Bahrain TV
- Release: 2006

Bela Rahma is an Arabic television drama.

== Plot ==
A rich beautiful woman (Fajer) lives with her little sister (Wedd) who has Down syndrome, and her struggle with her addicted cousin (Jassim) to live a peaceful life.

== Cast ==
- Zainab Al Askari
- Miriam Al-Saleh
- Abeer Al-Jundi
- Ali Jumaa
- Ibrahim Al-Zageli
- Saad Al-Buanen
- Hibba Al-Dedri

=== Music ===
The song was sung by Nabil She'al

=== Awards ===
Bela Rahma was selected the best gulf series in 2006, and Zainab Al Askari was also selected the best actress for her role for the second time.
