= Lawrence Quaye =

Qatari footballer (born 1984)

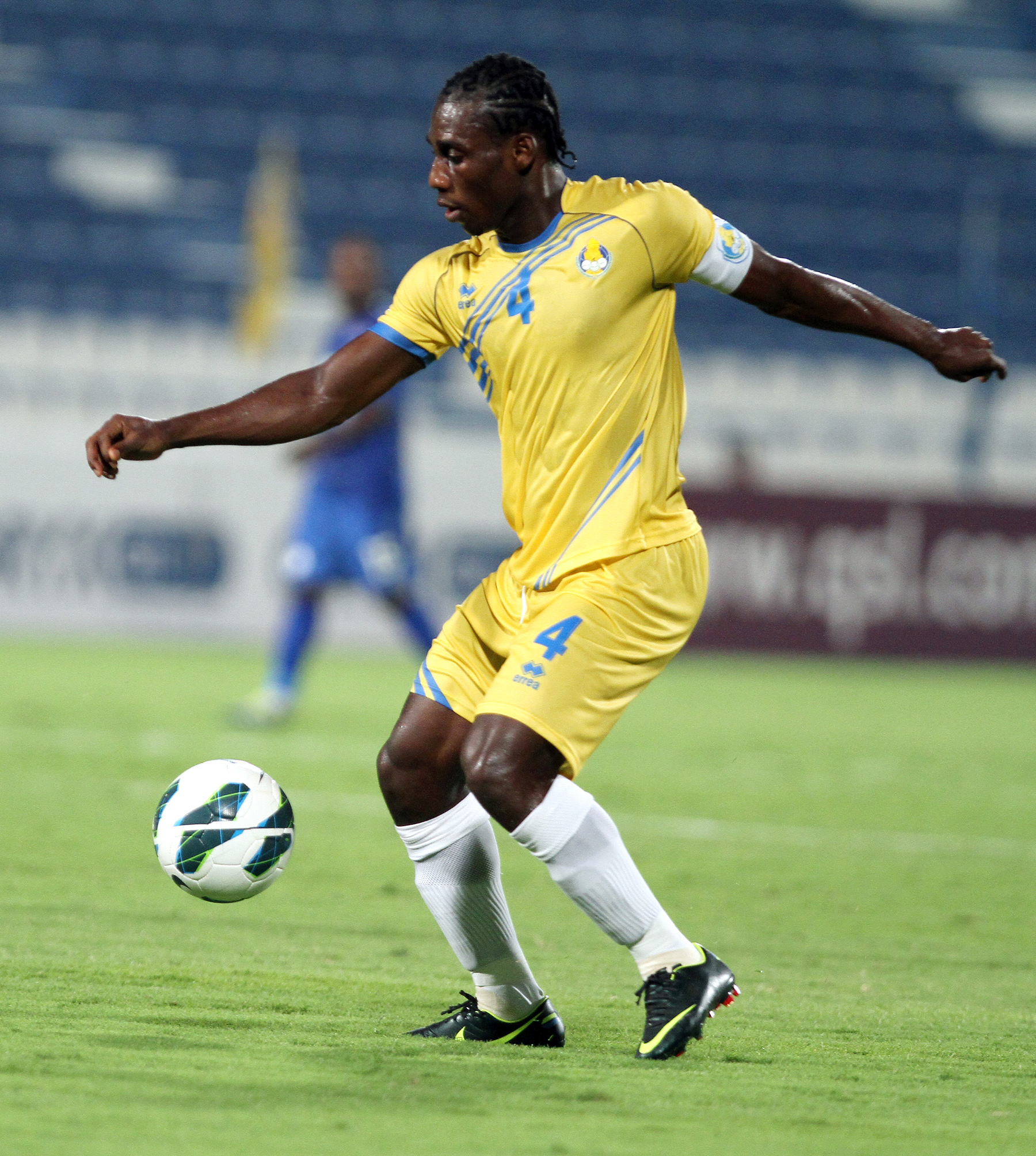
- Quaye (2012)

Personal information
- Full name: Lawrence Awuley Quaye
- Date of birth: 22 August 1984 (age 42)
- Place of birth: Accra, Ghana
- Height: 1.76 m (5 ft 9 in)
- Position: Central midfielder

Youth career
- Liberty Professionals

Senior career*
Years	Team	Apps	(Gls)
2001–2002	Liberty Professionals		
2003–2004	Saint-Étienne	28	(1)
2004–2017	Al-Gharafa	266	(33)
2017–2018	Al-Markhiya	13	(0)
2018–2021	Umm Salal	61	(3)
2021–2023	Al-Kharaitiyat	25	(0)

International career
2001	Ghana U18	3+	(0)
2010–2013	Qatar	33	(0)
- * Club domestic league appearances and goals

Lawrence Awuley Quaye (born 22 August 1984) is a former professional footballer who played as a central midfielder.

Born in Ghana, Quaye gained Qatari citizenship and represented the Qatar national team. He took the Arabic name of Anas Mubarak (Arabic: أنس مبارك) after becoming a Qatari citizen.

== Club career ==
=== Early career ===
Born in Accra, Quaye began his career with Liberty Professionals. In January 2003 he was signed by French Ligue 2 side Saint-Étienne. He played his first Ligue 2 match and first league start on 8 March 2003, a 1–1 draw with Wasquehal. He scored his only goal for the club on 6 December 2003 against Gueugnon, which was the only goal of the match.

=== Al-Gharafa ===
He then left for Qatari club Al-Gharafa.

He played 5 times in 2006 AFC Champions League, and scored twice (1 goal each) against Al-Karamah on matchday 3 & 4. He missed matchday 5 due to injury.

He also a regular starter in 2008 and 2009 edition, played 4 and 5 games respectively. In 2010 edition, he only played in the both legs of the quarter-finals, losing to Al Hilal 4–5 in aggregate.

== International career ==
He played for the Black Starlets at 2001 Meridian Cup, including a 1–1 draw with Portugal U18, losing to Italy U18 0–1 as captain. and losing 0–2 to Spain.

In 2010, he changed to play for Qatar at 2011 AFC Asian Cup, which Qatar as host. He capped for his adoptive nation in warm-up friendlies, against Haiti, Egypt, Estonia, Iran and North Korea. He also played all 3 matches against Kuwait, Yemen and Saudi Arabia in 20th Arabian Gulf Cup. He was the starting central midfielder in all 3 group stage matches and in the quarter-finals, all partnered with Wesam Rizik. After the cup, he played against Russia to prepare for the 2014 FIFA World Cup qualification (AFC). He also capped for Qatar in an unofficial friendly against FC Lausanne-Sport and FC Bayern Munich.

== Personal life ==
Lawrence is the brother of Abdullah Quaye (born Awuley Quaye Jr.). He is the son of Olympics & Ghanaian international defender Awuley Quaye Sr.

== Career statistics ==
=== Club ===
Statistics accurate as of 22 March 2024

Appearances and goals by club, season and competition
Club	Season	League			Cup^{1}		League Cup^{2}		Continental^{3}		Total	
Club	Season	Division	Apps	Goals	Apps	Goals	Apps	Goals	Apps	Goals	Apps	Goals
Al-Gharafa	2004–05	QSL	25	1	1	0						
Al-Gharafa	2005–06	QSL	25	0	4	0			5	1		
Al-Gharafa	2006–07	QSL	25	5	0	0						
Al-Gharafa	2007–08	QSL	24	6	3	0						
Al-Gharafa	2008–09	QSL	26	4	3	1		3	4	0		
Al-Gharafa	2009–10	QSL	9	3	0	0			2	0		
Al-Gharafa	2010–11	QSL	20	7	3	0			6	0		
Al-Gharafa	2011–12	QSL	21	0	4	0	1	0	5	1		
Al-Gharafa	2012–13	QSL	20	0	2	0			7	2		
Al-Gharafa	2013–14	QSL	20	5	3	0	1	0				
Al-Gharafa	2014–15	QSL	9	0	1	0						
Al-Gharafa	2015–16	QSL	23	1	2	0						
Al-Gharafa	2016–17	QSL	19	1	2	0						
Al-Gharafa	Total		266	33	28	1			29	4		
Al-Markhiya	2017–18	QSL	13	0	0	0						
Umm Salal	2018–19	QSL	21	1	2	0						
Umm Salal	2019–20	QSL	20	1	0	0						
Umm Salal	2020–21	QSL	20	1	1	1						
Umm Salal	Total		61	3	3	1						
Al Kharaitiyat	2021–22	QSD	3	0	1	0						
Al Kharaitiyat	2022–23	QSD	9	0	3	0						
Al Kharaitiyat	Total		12	0	3	0						
Career total			351	36	34	2						

^{1}Includes Emir of Qatar Cup and Qatar Second Division Cup.

^{2}Includes Sheikh Jassem Cup.

^{3}Includes AFC Champions League.

=== International ===
Appearances and goals by national team and year
National team	Year	Apps	Goals
Qatar	2010	7	0
Qatar	2011	15	0
Qatar	2012	10	0
Qatar	2013	1	0
Total		33	0

== Honours ==
Saint-Étienne

- Ligue 2: 2004

Al-Gharafa

- Qatar Stars League: 2005, 2008, 2009, 2010
- Emir of Qatar Cup: 2009
- Qatari Stars Cup: 2009
- Qatar Crown Prince Cup: 2010
- Sheikh Jassem Cup: 2006, 2008
