= Enad =

Enad may refer to:

== People ==
- Abdulmajeed Enad (born 1994), Qatari football player
- Abdurahman Enad (born 1996), Qatari football player
- Enad Ličina (born 1979), Serbian boxer
- Thamer Enad (born 1970), Kuwait football manager

== Sport clubs in Cyprus ==
- ENAD Ayiou Dometiou
- ENAD Ayiou Dometiou FC
- ENAD Polis Chrysochous FC

== Other ==
- Enad Global 7, Swedish company
