= Johar Al Kaabi =

Qatari footballer (born 1988)

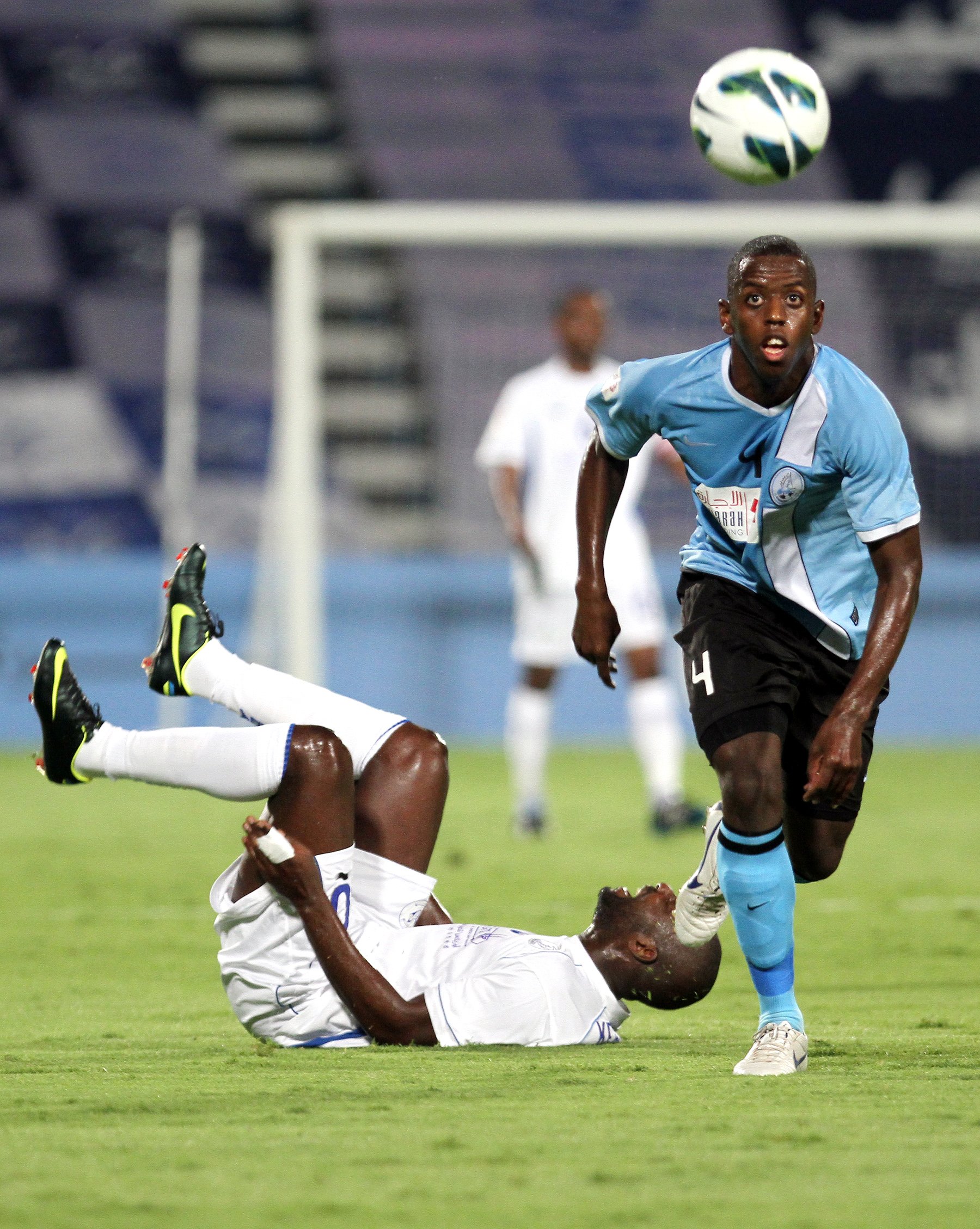
- Johar Al Kaabi (right) in 2012

Personal information
- Full name: Johar Abdulaziz Al Kaabi
- Date of birth: 9 June 1988 (age 38)
- Place of birth: Qatar
- Height: 1.80 m (5 ft 11 in)
- Position: Defender

Senior career*
| Years | Team | Apps | (Gls) |
| 2006–2012 | Al-Arabi | 24 | (0) |
| 2012–2018 | Al-Wakrah | | |
- * Club domestic league appearances and goals as of 11:41, 15 July 2012 (UTC)

Johar Al Kaabi (born 9 June 1988) is a Qatari footballer. He currently plays as a defender.

Al Kaabi played for Qatar at the 2005 FIFA U-17 World Championship in Peru.

== Club career statistics ==
Statistics accurate as of 21 June 2012

| Club | Season | League | League | | Cup^{1} | | League Cup^{2} | | Continental^{3} | | Total | |
| Club | Season | League | Apps | Goals | Apps | Goals | Apps | Goals | Apps | Goals | Apps | Goals |
|---|---|---|---|---|---|---|---|---|---|---|---|---|
| Al-Arabi | 2006–07 | QSL | 0 | 0 | | | | | | | | |
| Al-Arabi | 2007–08 | QSL | 0 | 0 | | | | | | | | |
| Al-Arabi | 2008–09 | QSL | 3 | 0 | | | | | | | | |
| Al-Arabi | 2009–10 | QSL | 14 | 0 | | | | | | | | |
| Al-Arabi | 2010–11 | QSL | 1 | 0 | | | | | | | | |
| Al-Arabi | 2011–12 | QSL | 6 | 0 | | | | | | | | |
| Al-Arabi | Total | | 24 | 0 | | | | | | | | |
| Career total | | | 24 | 0 | | | | | | | | |

^{1}Includes Emir of Qatar Cup.

^{2}Includes Sheikh Jassem Cup.

^{3}Includes AFC Champions League.
