= Mosaab Mahmoud =

Qatari footballer (born 1983)

Mosaab Mohamoud
Personal information
- Full name: Mosaab Mohamoud Mohamed Elhassan
- Date of birth: January 1, 1983 (age 43)
- Place of birth: Al-Fashir, Sudan
- Height: 1.67 m (5 ft 5 1/2 in)
- Position: Full-back

Senior career*
Years	Team	Apps	(Gls)
2003–2004	Al Gharafa	1	(0)
2004–2010	Al-Kharitiyath	50	(3)
2010	→ Al Sadd (loan)	9	(0)
2010–2012	Al-Khor	24	(1)
2011	→ Al-Kharitiyath (loan)	14	(0)
2012	→ Al Rayyan (loan)	5	(0)
2012–2016	El Jaish	39	(0)
2013–2014	→Umm Salal SC (loan)	19	(0)
2015–2016	→ Al Arabi (loan)	20	(2)
2016–2017	Al Rayyan	1	(0)
2017–2018	Al-Markhiya	15	(0)
2019	Umm Salal SC	4	(0)
2019–2023	Al Bidda	-	(-)

International career^{‡}
2013–2020	Qatar	19	(0)
- * Club domestic league appearances and goals ‡ National team caps and goals as of 27 March 2016

Mosaab Mohamoud Mohamed Elhassan (Arabic: مصعب محمود الحسن; born on January 1, 1983) is a former footballer. Born in Sudan, he represented Qatar at international level.

== Career ==
The defender was loaned out in January 2010 to Al Sadd from Al-Kharitiyath.

Mosaab was born and raised in Sudan, but became a naturalized Qatari citizen, and plays for the Qatar national football team.
