= Abdulmajid Anad =

Qatari footballer (born 1994)

Personal information
- Full name: Abdulmajid Anad Al-Diri
- Date of birth: 7 January 1994 (age 32)
- Place of birth: Qatar
- Position: Midfielder

Team information
- Current team: Muaither
- Number: 37

Senior career*
| Years | Team | Apps | (Gls) |
| 2013–2017 | Al-Rayyan | 37 | (4) |
| 2017–2019 | Al-Gharafa | 0 | (0) |
| 2020–2025 | Al-Kharaitiyat | | |
| 2025– | Muaither | | |
- * Club domestic league appearances and goals

Abdulmajid Anad (Arabic:عبد المجيد عناد) (born 7 January 1994) is a Qatari footballer. He currently plays for Muaither as a midfielder.
