= Adan Ali =

Somali footballer (born 1988)

Personal information
- Full name: Adan Ali Adan Quinella
- Date of birth: 27 September 1988 (age 38)
- Place of birth: Somalia
- Height: 1.76 m (5 ft 9 1/2 in)
- Position: Left-back

Senior career*
Years	Team	Apps	(Gls)
2008–2012	Al-Wakrah	48	(2)
2012–2014	Umm Salal	43	(0)
2014–2015	Al Arabi	19	(2)
2015–2017	Al-Gharafa	22	(0)
2017–2021	Al-Markhiya	-	(-)
2022–2023	Al-Kharaitiyat		
- * Club domestic league appearances and goals

Adan Ali Adan Quinella (Arabic: أدن علي أدن; born 27 September 1988) is a Somali footballer plays a left back.
