= Zainab Al Askari =

Bahraini actress and model

Zainab Al-Askari
- زينب العسكري
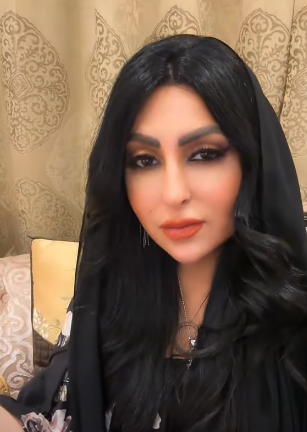
- Born: Zainab Ghuloom Hassan Ali; February 6, 1974 (age 51); Manama, Bahrain
- Occupation(s): actress, screenwriter, model
- Years active: 1990—2008
- Spouse: Abdullah bin Salem Al Qasimi
- Children: Zain, Hala, Ghala

Zainab Al-Askari (Arabic: زينب العسكري; born February 6, 1974) is a Bahraini actress, screenwriter, producer, spokesmodel, and model popular in the Persian Gulf region. She retired from performing in 2009.

== Career ==
Al-Askari has appeared as one of the main characters in several Kuwaiti and Saudi Arabian TV shows as well, she is also a spokesmodel for Parachute in the Persian Gulf region.

In 2005, she appeared in Athary; a series about a kind young girl who faces many challenges in her life that determine her fate. Athary was the first series of Zainab Al Askari's own production company (Bint El-Mamlaka). She was selected as best actress in a Gulf series in 2005 for her role in Athary. Her last appearance was in the series Bela Rahma (Without Mercy). The show was selected the best gulf series in 2006, and Al-Askari was again nominated best actress for her role.

== Work ==
=== Television series ===
Filmography
Year	Series	Role
1992	Another Girl	Najm
1993	Sar Wash Was	
1995	وجوه بلا ملامح	
1995	عيني يا بحر	Sarah
1995	بيت المغتني	Maryam
1995	Sour Sweet	Salwa
1995-2002	Tash ma Tash	several roles
1995	Whales	
1995	Hassan and Nour Al-Sana	Nour Al-Sana
1996	Forgive Me, Father	
1996	Hawazi Al-Dar	several roles
1996	Khallek Maa'i	
1997	Illusion	Mona
1997	'Ahlam Dayiea	Reem
1998	أبواب	
1998	Saadoun	guest star
1998	Tali Al-Omor	Samar
1998	Fayez Al-Toush 4	several roles
1999	Dreams of the Simple	
2000	الزمن والناس	Example
2000	Jawaher 3	Sheikha Mozna (young)
2000	Thank You	
2001	عد وإغلط	
2001	دموع شارع	Layali
2001	أحلام رمادية	
2001	سر الحياة	
2001	Jorouh Baredah	
2002	العود	
2002	Nourah	
2002	Sahem Al-Ghader	Maha
2002	The Nebula	
2003	ناس وناس	Ghazal
2003	ملاذ الطير	Amal
2003	Damaaet Omr	Mashael
2003	بيتنا الكبير	
2003	Hataa Altajamud	Hend
2004	Sawalif Harim	
2004	World for the Mighty	Budur
2004	Map of Umm Rakan	Ruqayya
2004	Calms and Storms	Huda
2005	Alghurub Al'Akhir	
2005	You Are Mubarak	Basma
2005	عذاري	Adhara
2006	Bela Rahma	Fajr
2007	Moment of Weakness	Farah
2008	Curse of a Woman	Ghurur

=== Theatre ===
Acting career
Year	Play	Role
1990	جحا والأرض	
1993	وحش الليل	
1996	Iftah Ya Simsim	
1996	الذيب وليلى	Leila
1998	النوخذة الصغير	Noor
1999	شوق والغابة المسحورة	Shoug
2003	Antar bad al Tajmil	Abla
2004	حب في الفلوجة	Farah

=== Screenwriting ===
Writing career
Year	Work	Contribution
2006	Bela Rahma	screenplay
2007	Moment of Weakness	creator, some dialogue
