= Olivier Tia =

Ivorian footballer

Personal information
- Full name: Olivier Tia Tokbé
- Date of birth: December 22, 1982 (age 43)
- Place of birth: Ivory Coast
- Height: 1.72 m (5 ft 7 1/2 in)
- Position: Forward

Youth career
- Stade d'Abidjanh
- ASEC Mimosas

Senior career*
Years	Team	Apps	(Gls)
2004–2005	KSK Beveren		
2005	Sint-Niklaas		
2006–2007	KFCO Wilrijk		
2007–2008	Olympique Béja		
2008–2011	Al Ahli Doha		
2011–2012	Ajman Club	6	(0)
2012–2013	Al-Fujairah SC		
2013–2014	Al-Merrikh		
2015	Stade d'Abidjanh		
2016	ASI Abengourou		
- * Club domestic league appearances and goals

Olivier Tia Tokbe (born 22 December 1982) is an Ivorian footballer who plays as a forward.
