= Ali Jumaa =

Qatari footballer (born 1982)

Personal information
- Full name: Ali Jumaa Al-Muhannadi
- Date of birth: 1 January 1982 (age 44)
- Place of birth: Qatar
- Height: 1.74 m (5 ft 8 1/2 in)
- Position: Right-back

Senior career*
Years	Team	Apps	(Gls)
2004–2012	Al-Khor		
2007–2008	→ Qatar (loan)		
2012–2013	Al-Gharafa		
2014–2015	Al Ahli		
2015–2016	Al-Khor		
- * Club domestic league appearances and goals

Ali Jumaa (Arabic:علي جمعة; born 1 January 1982) is a Qatari footballer.
