= William (footballer, born 1977) =

Brazilian footballer

Personal information
- Full name: Gilberto William Fabbro
- Date of birth: March 30, 1977 (age 49)
- Place of birth: Foz do Iguaçu, Brazil
- Height: 1.77 m (5 ft 10 in)
- Position: Attacking midfielder

Team information
- Current team: Operário-PR

Youth career
- 1995–1997: Atlético-PR

Senior career*
Years	Team	Apps	(Gls)
1998	→ Ypiranga-RS (Loan)		
1998	→ Gama (Loan)		
1999	→ Qingdao Dahua (Loan)		
2000	→ São José-SP (Loan)		
2000	→ Gama (Loan)	9	(1)
2001–2003	Figueirense	63	(8)
2004	Atlético-PR	30	(0)
2005	→ Juventude (Loan)	11	(2)
2005–2006	→ Tenerife (Loan)		
2006–2007	→ Juventude (Loan)		
2007–2008	Al-Siliya Sports Club		
2008	Ponte Preta		
2009–2010	Joinville		
2010	Paysandu		
2011	Brusque	2	(1)
2011	Brasil de Pelotas		
2011	Fortaleza		
2012–	Operário-PR		
- * Club domestic league appearances and goals

Gilberto William Fabbro or simply William (born March 30, 1977, in Foz do Iguaçu), is a Brazilian attacking midfielder. He currently plays for Operário Ferroviário Esporte Clube.

== Honours ==
- Paraná State League: 1998, 2001
- Brazilian League (2nd division): 1998
- Santa Catarina State League: 2002
