= Erik van der Meer =

Dutch footballer and coach

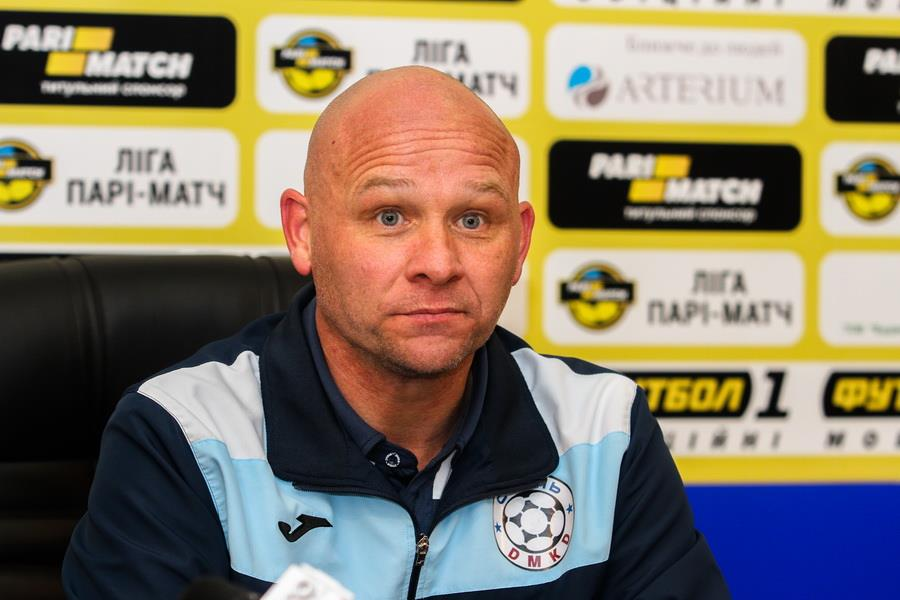

Personal information
- Date of birth: 7 July 1967 (age 59)
- Place of birth: Utrecht, Netherlands
- Height: 1.79 m (5 ft 10 1/2 in)
- Position: Defender

Youth career
- USV Elinkwijk

Senior career*
Years	Team	Apps	(Gls)
1985–1995	FC Utrecht	205	(9)
1995–1996	SC Cambuur	19	(0)
1996–1997	K. Beerschot V.A.C.	8	(0)
1997	Real Murcia	18	(3)
1997–1999	SC Veendam	31	(2)

International career
- Netherlands U-21

Managerial career
- 2002–2004: FC Utrecht (youth)
- 2004–2005: RBC Roosendaal (assistant)
- 2008: Al Ahli SC (assistant)
- 2009: DOVO
- 2010: Al Ahli SC (Doha)
- 2011: Al-Shamal SC (sports director)
- 2011–2014: FC Metalurh Donetsk
- 2014–2015: Frenz United
- 2016: FC Stal Dniprodzerzhynsk
- 2017: Qatar SC
- 2017: Budapest Honvéd FC
- * Club domestic league appearances and goals

Erik van der Meer (Dutch pronunciation: [ˈeːrɪk fɑn dər ˈmeːr]; (Note: In isolation, van is pronounced [vɑn].) born 7 July 1967 in Utrecht) is a Dutch professional football coach and a former player.

== Manager career ==
Since January 2016 he is a head coach of FC Stal Dniprodzerzhynsk. But resigned on 10 August 2016.

=== Budapest Honvéd ===
On 28 May 2017, van der Meer was appointed as the Nemzeti Bajnokság I club Budapest Honvéd FC. On 9 December van de Meer was sacked.
