= Waheed Mohammed Taher =

Qatari footballer (born 1982)

Waheed Mohammed
Personal information
- Full name: Waheed Mohammed Taher
- Date of birth: October 11, 1982 (age 44)
- Place of birth: Umm Salal, Qatar
- Height: 1.64 m (5 ft 4 1/2 in)
- Position: Defensive midfielder

Senior career*
Years	Team	Apps	(Gls)
2000–2007	Al Ahli	64	(1)
2007–2012	Al-Sailiya	49	(3)
2011–2012	→ Al Rayyan (loan)	8	(0)
2012–2018	Al-Wakrah		

International career
2010–2011	Qatar	1	(0)
- * Club domestic league appearances and goals

Waheed Mohammed Taher (born October 11, 1982) is a Qatari footballer who is a defensive midfielder . He is a member of the Qatar national football team.
