= Fuhaid Al-Shammari =

Qatari footballer (born 1982)

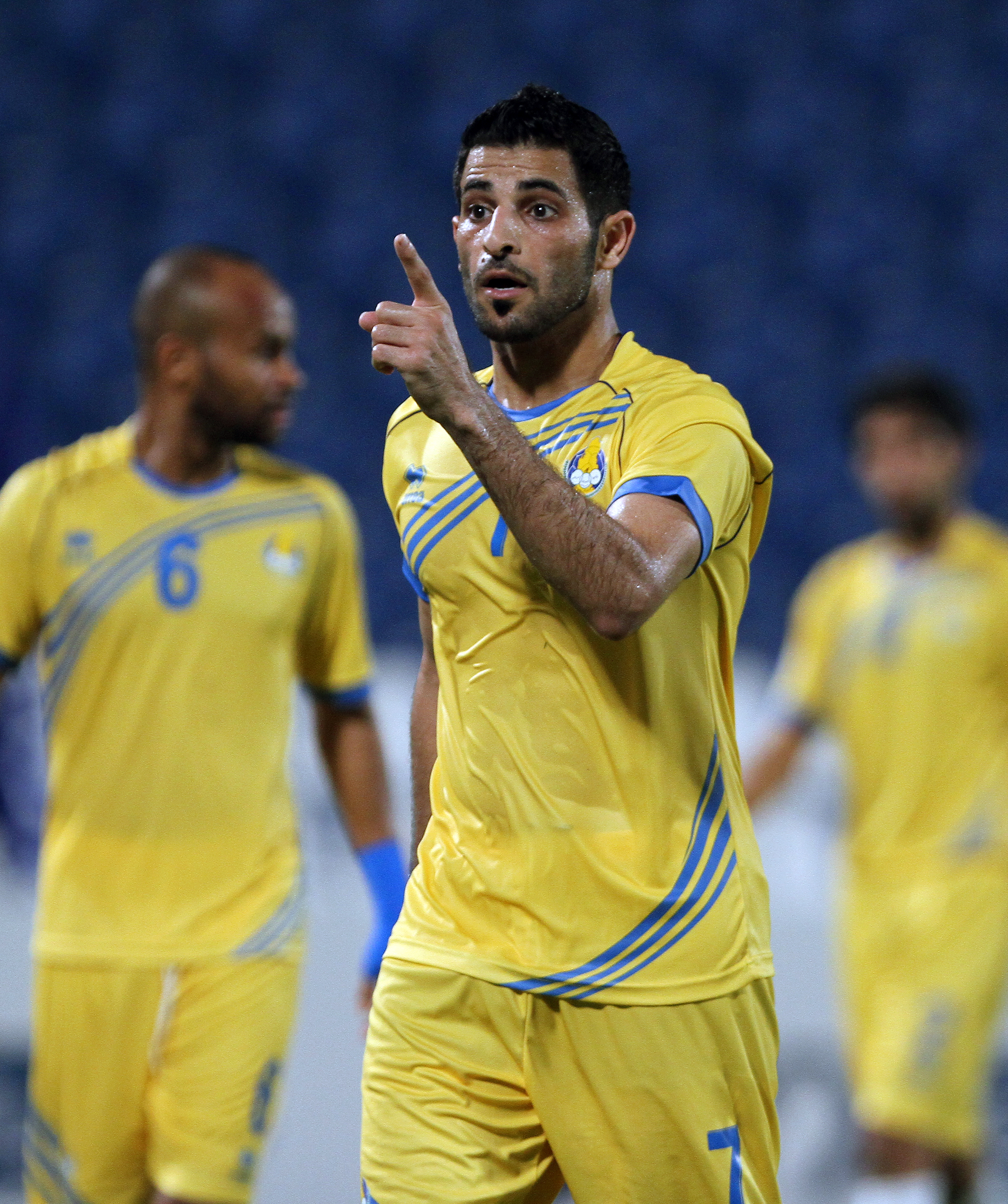
- Al Shammari (2012)

Personal information
- Full name: Fuhaid Sattam Al-Shammari
- Date of birth: 23 July 1982 (age 44)
- Place of birth: Doha, Qatar
- Height: 1.76 m (5 ft 9 1/2 in)
- Position: Winger

Youth career
- 1995–1999: Al Gharafa

Senior career*
Years	Team	Apps	(Gls)
1999–2019	Al Gharafa	280	(20)
Total		280	(20)

International career
2011	Qatar	1	(0)
- * Club domestic league appearances and goals as of 7 February 2012

Fuhaid Sattam Al-Shammari (Arabic: فُهَيْد سَطَّام الشَّمَّرِيّ; born 23 July 1982) is a Qatari footballer who is a winger. He is the brother of Saad Al-Shammari, the former captain of the Qatar national team.

== Club career ==
Shammari started his football career at the age of 12, when he joined the junior team of Al Gharafa under the guidance of Hassan Afif (the father of Ali Afif), who was then the youth coach of Al Gharafa. He advanced rapidly through the ranks of Al Gharafa, until he reached the first team in 1999 at the age of 16, the youngest footballer in the Qatar Stars League at that time. Shammari helped Al Gharafa win the league three consecutive times from 2008 to 2010. In the 2008 season, he scored a goal against Al Sadd, who were then second in the league, in the 4th minute of extra time to draw the game 1-1 to ensure Al Gharafa stayed in first place.

Additionally, in the 2007-2008, he was the top scorer in the reserve league with 14 goals, and was the driving force behind Al Gharafa winning the reserve league. He scored 23 goals in the reserve league the next season.

== Honours ==
=== Individual ===
- Qatari Reserve League Top Scorer

Winner (1): 2008

== Personal ==
Shammari is married and has a son named Tamim.
