= Mobello Baba Keita =

Senegalese footballer

Baba Keita
Personal information
- Full name: Mballo Baba Keita
- Date of birth: November 15, 1987 (age 38)
- Place of birth: Senegal
- Height: 1.80 m (5 ft 11 in)
- Position: Defender

Senior career*
Years	Team	Apps	(Gls)
2008–2011	Al-Sailiya		
2011–2012	Al Wakrah	3	(0)
2012–2013	Al-Arabi	13	(0)
2013–2014	Muaither SC	20	(0)
2014–2015	Umm Salal SC	0	(0)
2015–2016	Al-Khor SC		
- * Club domestic league appearances and goals

Mballo Baba Keita (born 15 November 1987) is a Senegalese footballer, who currently plays for Al-Arabi in the Qatar Stars League as a defender. Baba Keita was born on November 15, 1987. He lived with his family for a while until he moved to Qatar and started playing for teams like, Al-Arabi and Al-Khor.
