= 2000 Qatar Crown Prince Cup =

2000 Crown Prince Cup
Heir Apparent Cup

Tournament details
- Host country: Qatar
- Teams: 4

Final positions
- Champions: Al-Ittihad (1st title)

The 2000 Qatar Crown Prince Cup was the 6th edition of this cup tournament in men's football (soccer). It was played by the top 4 teams of the Q-League.

Al-Ittihad were crowned champions for the first time.

== Results ==
Semi-finals
(Qatar)	Al-Sadd	0	1	1
(Qatar)	Al-Ittihad	2	1	3
(Qatar)	Al-Rayyan	3	4	7
(Qatar)	Al-Arabi	1	3	4

Final
(Qatar)	Al-Rayyan	0 (8)
(Qatar)	Al-Ittihad	0 (9)

2000 Qatar Crown Prince Cup
Winners
Al-Ittihad
1st Title
