= Abdullah Alawi =

Qatari footballer (born 1991)

Personal information
- Full name: Abdullah Alawi Balghaith
- Date of birth: 5 August 1991 (age 35)
- Place of birth: Qatar
- Height: 1.71 m (5 ft 7 1/2 in)
- Position: Left-back

Youth career
- ASPIRE

Senior career*
| Years | Team | Apps | (Gls) |
| 2011–2012 | Qatar SC | 13 | (1) |
| 2012–2015 | Al-Rayyan | 24 | (0) |
| 2015–2017 | Qatar | 19 | (0) |
| 2017–2018 | Al Arabi | 6 | (0) |
| 2018–2019 | Al-Wakra | | |
| 2020 | Al-Shamal | | |
| 2020–2023 | Lusail | | |
- * Club domestic league appearances and goals

Abdullah Alawi (Arabic:عبد الله علوي) (born 5 August 1991) is a Qatari footballer. He currently plays as a left back.
