= Gabriel Schacht =

Brazilian footballer (born 1981)

Personal information
- Date of birth: 8 May 1981 (age 45)
- Place of birth: Carazinho, Brazil
- Height: 1.74 m (5 ft 9 in)
- Position: Midfielder

Team information
- Current team: Juventus

Youth career
- Internacional

Senior career*
Years	Team	Apps	(Gls)
–2001	Internacional		
2001–2002	Villa Nova		
2002–2003	Caxias		
2003–2004	Mogi Mirim		
2004–2005	Ponte Preta		
2005–2006	Marília		
2006–2007	Al Sailiya		
2008–2009	Botafogo		
2009	Brasil de Pelotas		
2010	Aboomoslem	5	(1)
2011–	Juventus		
- * Club domestic league appearances and goals

Gabriel Schacht (born 8 May 1981) is a Brazilian former professional footballer who played as a midfielder.

== Career ==
Schacht joined Aboomoslem in 2010.

== Career statistics ==
Appearances and goals by club, season and competition
Club	Season	League			Cup (Note: Includes Hazfi Cup.)		Continental		Total	
Club	Season	Division	Apps	Goals	Apps	Goals	Apps	Goals	Apps	Goals
Aboomoslem	2009–10	Persian Gulf Cup	5	1			–			
Career total			5	1			0	0		
