= Mirghani Al Zain =

Qatari footballer (born 1978)

Mirghani Al Zain Babiker
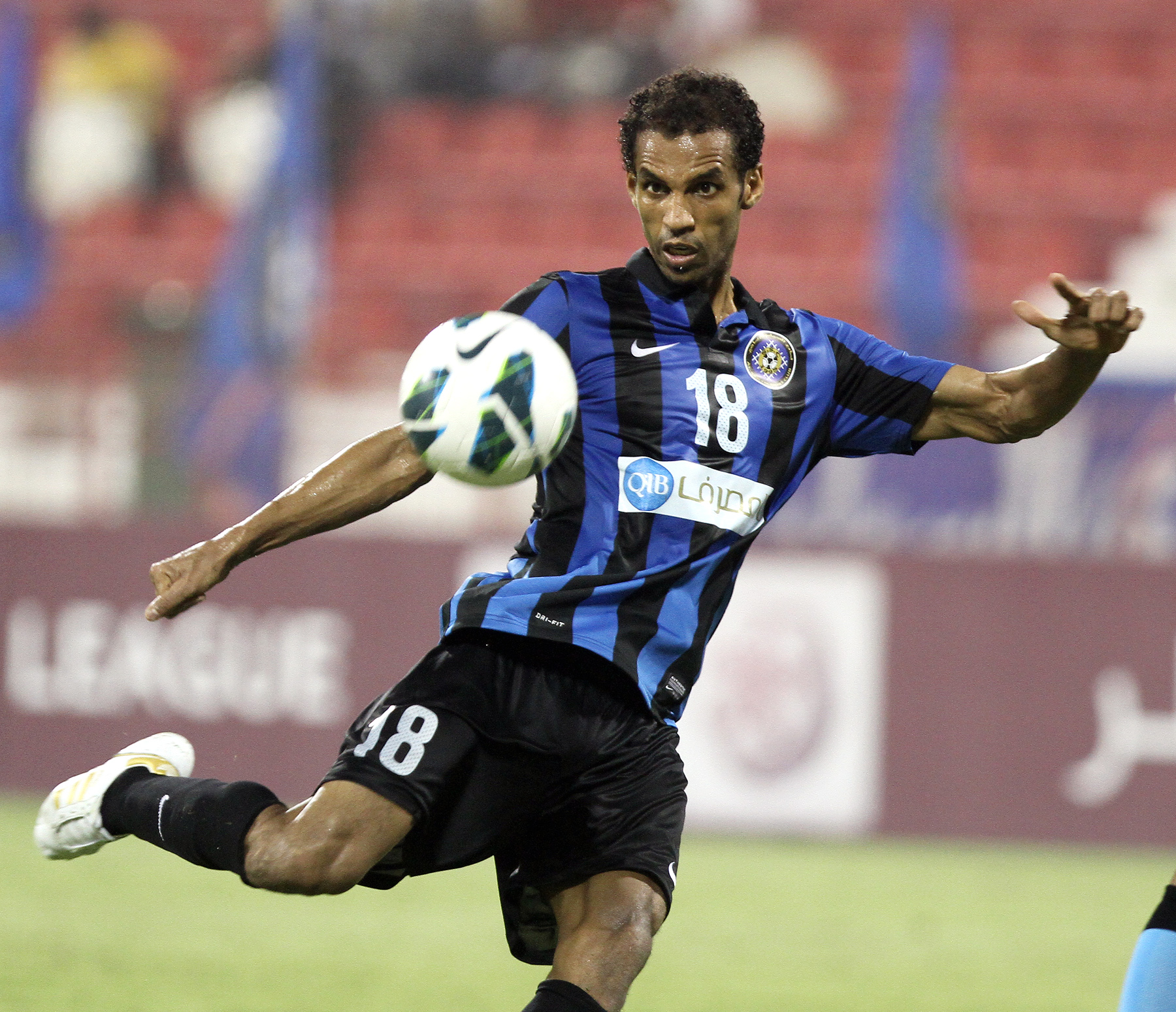
- Al Zain with Al-Sailiya in 2012

Personal information
- Date of birth: 18 August 1978 (age 48)
- Place of birth: Khartoum, Sudan
- Height: 1.83 m (6 ft 0 in)
- Position: Midfielder

Senior career*
Years	Team	Apps	(Gls)
1996–2009	Al-Wakrah	242	(53)
2009–2012	Al-Gharafa	52	(3)
2012–2019	Al-Sailiya	59	(3)

International career
1995	Qatar U17		
2001–2007	Qatar	5	(0)

Managerial career
- 2023–: Al-Sailiya SC
- * Club domestic league appearances and goals

Mirghani Al Zain (born 18 August 1978) is a retired football player and the current coach of Qatar Stars League club Al-Sailiya SC. Mirghani is the record-holder for the oldest player to play in the QSL at age 41. Born in Sudan, he represented Qatar internationally.

== Biography ==
He took part in the 1995 FIFA U-17 World Championship, representing Qatar.

Mirghani is one of the most capped players of all time for Al Wakrah, with 242 caps, according to the official Qatar Stars League website.

He has been the head coach of Qatar Stars League club Al-Sailiya since March 2023.

== Honours ==
=== Club ===
Al-Gharafa SC

- Qatar Stars League: 2009-10
- Emir of Qatar Cup: 2012
- Qatar Cup: 2011
