= Saad Al-Shammari =

Qatari footballer (born 1980)

Saad Al Shammari
Personal information
- Full name: Saad Sattam Saud Al Shammari
- Date of birth: 6 August 1980 (age 46)
- Place of birth: Rafha, Saudi Arabia
- Height: 1.76 m (5 ft 9 in)
- Position: Centre-back

Youth career
- 1990–1995: Al Gharafa

Senior career*
Years	Team	Apps	(Gls)
1997–2004	Al Gharafa	100	(2)
2004	Esbjerg fB	0	(0)
2004–2011	Al Gharafa	129	(7)
2011–2013	El Jaish	26	(0)
2013–2014	Umm Salal	14	(0)
2014–2015	Al-Wakrah	15	(0)
Total		284	(9)

International career^{‡}
2000–2010	Qatar	99	(7)
- * Club domestic league appearances and goals as of 22/03/2024 ‡ National team caps and goals as of 22/03/2024

Saad Sattam Saud Al Shammari (Arabic: سَعْد سَطَّام سُعُود الشَّمَّرِيّ; born 6 August 1980) is a former footballer who played as a central defender. Born in Saudi Arabia, he represented the Qatar national team.

Saad's brother, Fahad Al Shammari is also a former footballer, having played for Al Gharafa.

== Club career ==
He played for newly promoted team Al Jaish after joining them from Al Gharafa in 2011. He previously played for Danish side Esbjerg fB in 2004. He has won the Qatari league three times and several domestic cup titles.

== International career ==
He was a part of the squad that won the Gulf Cup in 2004 over Oman on penalties. He scored one goal in the group stage.

== Honours ==
Al Gharafa

- Qatari League: 2004-05, 2007–08, 2008-09
- Emir of Qatar Cup: 2009
- Qatar Crown Prince Cup: 2000
- Sheikh Jassem Cup: 2005, 2007

Qatar

- Gulf Cup: 2004

== Personal life ==
He married in 2009 in his hometown of Rafha, Kingdom of Saudi Arabia.
