= Léo Borges (footballer, born 1985) =

Brazilian footballer

Personal information
- Full name: Leonardo Borges de Azevedo
- Date of birth: February 1, 1985 (age 41)
- Place of birth: Brasília, Brazil
- Position: Midfielder

Team information
- Current team: Damash Iranian

Senior career*
Years	Team	Apps	(Gls)
2007–2008	Uberaba		
2008	Grande Rio Brescia		
2008–2009	Vasco da Gama	6	(1)
2009–2010	Dom Pedro		
2010–	Damash Iranian	12	(8)
- * Club domestic league appearances and goals as of 17 May 2010 (UTC) ‡ National team caps and goals as of 17 May 2010

Leonardo Borges de Azevedo (born February 1, 1985), known as Léo Borges, is a Brazilian footballer who plays for Damash Iranian F.C. in the Azadegan League.

== Club career ==
Borges joined Damash Iranian F.C. in 2010.

Club performance			League		Cup		Continental		Total	
Season	Club	League	Apps	Goals	Apps	Goals	Apps	Goals	Apps	Goals
Iran			League		Hazfi Cup		Asia		Total	
2009–10	Damash Iranian	Azadegan League	6	2	0	0	-	-	6	2
2010–11	Damash Iranian	Azadegan League	6	4	0	0	-	-	6	4
Total	Iran		12	8	0	0	0	12	8	
Career total			12	8	0	0	0	0	12	8
