= Muaither SC =

Sports club in Qatar

Muaither S.C.
- Full name: Muaither Sports Club
- Nickname: Al Kahilan
- Founded: 1996; 30 years ago
- Ground: Thani bin Jassim Stadium; Al Gharrafa, Qatar
- Capacity: 21,175
- Chairman: Saleh Al-Aji
- Manager: Jorge da Silva
- League: Qatari Second Division
- 2023–24: Qatar Stars League, 12th of 12 (relegated)
- Website: www.muaither.com
Home colours

Muaither SC (Arabic: نادي معيذر الرياضي) is a multi-sports club based in Muaither, Qatar. It is best known for its football department, which plays in the Qatari Second Division.

== History ==
=== 1996–2013: Second division ===
The club was founded in 1996 as "Al Shabab". It changed its name to "Al Muaither" in 2004 by decision of the Qatar Olympic Committee. They played exclusively in the Qatari Second Division until 2013.

Their first promotion play-off was in the 1999–00 season against Al Shamal, losing the match. This was the first promotion play-off to ever take place in Qatar.

In 2004, Muaither became the first team in history from the second division to win the Sheikh Jassem Cup. They defeated Al-Wakrah SC 2–1 in the final.

The club suffered its largest loss in August 2006 in the Sheikh Jassem Cup against Al Sadd, losing 0-21. This loss marked the largest loss of any club in a professional football club in the GCC at the time.

They finished as runners-up of the Second Division in the 2012 and 2013 season, which earned them promotion play-off matches against Umm Salal and Al Arabi. They lost the first match against Umm Salal, which was the club's second promotion play-off match in its history, by a scoreline of 0–1 after extra time in 2012. They also lost 1–2 against Al Arabi after extra time in 2013.

Their president, Saleh Al-Aji, filed a complaint on 23 April against Al Arabi under the pretense that they were fielding a suspended player, Baba Keita. This was according to the league statistics available on the Qatar Football Association's website. The QFA dashed their hope of being promoted by officially stating that the information they presented was not available on the website, and that Muaither must have acquired the information from third-party sources.

=== 2013–present: Promotions and subsequent relegations ===
It was announced on 7 May 2013 that the Qatar Stars League would expand to 14 clubs, which inferred that Muaither would be promoted to the first division despite losing the relegation play-off.

Their first action in the first division was to hire renowned Spanish-French coach, Ladislas Lozano. He was sacked on 1, February 2014 after the club lost 5–0 to Al Duhail SC.

They were relegated at the end of the 2013–14 season, along with Al Rayyan. Coach Ladislaz Lozano was replaced by Moroccan coach Mohammed Sahel, who was then replaced by compatriot Fouad Al Sahabi. Al Sahabi assembled a first team squad comprising three Moroccan professional players, however, despite pushing the club towards the top of the second division league table, the club failed to win promotion back to the Stars League, with its hopes being dashed after a loss to El Jaish's reserve team in April 2015. Al Sahabi was sacked as a result and replaced by the club's youth team coach.

After securing a 1–0 win against Al Rayyan in the second division on 14 March 2016, the team, led by Philippe Burle, was promoted to the Qatar Stars League for the second time in its history. However, Burle's Al Muaither was relegated at the end of the 2016–17 season after losing 16 of its 26 matches.

The club won the Second Division Cup for the second time in its history in December 2019 under coach Philippe Burle after beating Al Markhiya 3–2. Also that year, the club finished as runners-up in the 2019–20 Second Division, earning them a promotion play-off match against Qatar SC. However, Muaither lost the match 0–1.

==== 2022–2024: Promotion to Stars League and subsequent relegation ====
After winning the 2022–23 Second Division title, the club was once promoted to the Stars League for the third time in its history. They finished 12th in 2023–24 and were relegated after spending only a single season in the Stars League.

== Stadium ==
Currently, the club uses Thani bin Jassim Stadium in Al Gharrafa as its home stadium. The club's 42,000 m^{2} headquarters includes an administrative building and two football training grounds, but does not have a professional-capacity stadium.

== Current squad ==
As of Qatari Second Division:

Note: Flags indicate national team as defined under FIFA eligibility rules; some limited exceptions apply. Players may hold more than one non-FIFA nationality.

No.	Pos.	Nation	Player
1	GK	QAT	Majed Abdullatif
3	DF	ALG	Fouad Hanfoug
4	DF	QAT	Mohamed Rabea
7	MF	QAT	Mohammed Abdelkader
8	MF	ESP	Marc Marruecos
11	MF	QAT	Yousef Al-Yahri
12	DF	QAT	Eissa El-Nagar
14	MF	QAT	Mohammed Al-Badr
17	MF	QAT	Abdulrahman Al-Salahi
18	MF	QAT	Raad Majed
19	DF	QAT	Ziyad Tarek
27	DF	CIV	Siriky Diabaté
33	DF	QAT	Salman Foaad

No.	Pos.	Nation	Player
37	MF	QAT	Abdulmajid Anad
40	GK	TUN	Anas Khardani
60	FW	EGY	Amr Abdelfattah
61	MF	JOR	Ibrahim Ali
62	FW	QAT	Suhaib Muaaz
66	MF	QAT	Samer Emad
74	GK	QAT	Mohamed Nagy
77	MF	QAT	Khaldoun Moussa
88	MF	QAT	Abdulrahman Kamal
98	MF	EGY	Waleed Khaled
—	DF	ARG	Lautaro Busto (on loan from Almagro)
—	FW	MAR	Abde Raihani

== Current team staff ==
Coaching staff
Head coach	(Morocco) Mounir Jaaouani
Goalkeeping coach	(Romania) Mihal Barbu (Poland) Michał Chamera
Fitness coach	(Romania) Daniel Rouman
Physiotherapist	(Philippines) Anthony Padayao
Driver	(England) Ben Goodson
Technical staff
Team manager	(Qatar) Mahmoud Ali Mahmoud
Administrator	(Qatar) Hussein Khudair (Qatar) Jamal Saeed (Qatar) Ali Salah

== Honours ==
- Qatari Second Division
  - Winners (2): 2015–16, 2022–23
- Qatari Second Division Cup
  - Winners (2): ??, 2018
- Qatari Sheikh Jassim Cup
  - Winners (1): 2003

== Managerial history ==
- (Egypt) Fareed Ramzi (2004)
- (Egypt) Sabri Miniawy (2004–2006)
- (Iraq) Wamidh Munir (2006)
- (Morocco) Abdelkader Youmir (2006–2007)
- (Morocco) Abdulrahman Taleb (2007–2008)
- (Tunisia) Mohammed Bin Naji (2008)
- (Morocco) Najeeb Al Hanouni (2009)
- (Qatar) Abdullah Saad (2009)
- (Iraq) Wamidh Munir (2009–2010)
- (Netherlands) Silvio Diliberto (2011–2012)
- (Morocco) Mohammed Sahel (2012–2013)
- (Spain) Ladislas Lozano (19 June 2013 – 1 February 2014)
- (Morocco) Mohammed Sahel (1 February 2014–February 2015)
- (Morocco) Fouad Al Sahabi (February 2015–15 April 2015)
- (France) Philippe Burle (June 2015–March 2019)
- (Iraq) Shaker Abdul Latif (March 2019) (interim)
- (France) Philippe Burle (March 2019–October 2019)
- (Morocco) Sami Saleheldin (October 2019) (interim)
- (France) Philippe Burle (October 2019–1 October 2020)
- (Morocco) Mounir Jaaouani (1 October 2020–)
