= Otmane El Assas =

Moroccan footballer (born 1979)

Personal information
- Full name: Otmane El Assas
- Date of birth: 30 January 1979 (age 47)
- Place of birth: Khouribga, Morocco
- Height: 1.76 m (5 ft 9 1/2 in)
- Position: Defensive midfielder

Senior career*
Years	Team	Apps	(Gls)
2000–2002	Olympique Khouribga		
2001–2004	Sharjah FC		(16)
2004–2014	Al Gharrafa	174	(24)
2012–2014	→ Umm Salal (loan)	47	(10)
2016	Olympique Khouribga		

International career
2000–2007	Morocco	15	(1)
- * Club domestic league appearances and goals as of 12 July 2023

Otmane El Assas (Arabic: عثمان العساس; born 30 January 1979) is a retired Moroccan footballer who played most of his career as a midfielder for Qatar Stars League outfit Al Gharrafa.

He was part of the Moroccan 2004 Olympic football team, who exited in the first round, finishing third in group D, behind group winners Iraq and runners-up Costa Rica. He also competed at the 2000 Summer Olympics in Sydney.

He is the longest serving foreign professional footballer in the Qatar Stars League as of 2014.
