= Araújo (footballer, born 1977) =

Brazilian footballer

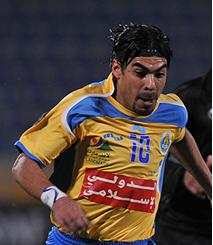

Personal information
- Full name: Clemerson de Araújo Soares
- Date of birth: 8 August 1977 (age 49)
- Place of birth: Caruaru, Brazil
- Height: 1.72 m (5 ft 8 in)
- Position: Forward

Youth career
- 1996: Porto-PE

Senior career*
Years	Team	Apps	(Gls)
1997–2003	Goiás	170	(50)
2004	Shimizu S-Pulse	29	(9)
2005	Gamba Osaka	33	(33)
2006–2007	Cruzeiro	15	(5)
2007–2010	Al-Gharafa	133	(113)
2011–2012	Fluminense	6	(0)
2012	→ Náutico (loan)	33	(8)
2013	Atlético Mineiro	4	(1)
2013–2014	Goiás	35	(9)
2016	Central	14	(4)
2017	Sete de Setembro		
2025–	Porto-PE	4	(1)

International career
1999	Brazil U23	3	(3)
- * Club domestic league appearances and goals

Clemerson de Araújo Soares, best known as Araújo (born 8 August 1977) is a Brazilian former professional footballer who played as a forward.

== Career ==
Araujo was born in Caruaru, PE, Brazil. He played for Japanese side Gamba Osaka in 2005; his 33 league goals helped Gamba to the 2005 J1 League title. 2005 was his last season in Japan. Araujo left for his homeland to sign for Cruzeiro. Two years later Araujo left for Qatar where he the 2007–08 season top scorer award.

=== Al-Gharafa ===
Al-Gharafa, known as Al Fuhud (The Cheetahs) were Qatar's champions for three years in a row. Araujo was a leading star in the team's success, leading the scorers list for the entire 2008 season. On 4 March 2008, after scoring against Al Khor, he matched Gabriel Batistuta's record of 25 goals in one season. He eventually ended the season as the league's top scorer with 27 goals, a record that was broken in December 2018 by Baghdad Bounedjah. He played alongside fellow Brazilian Juninho Pernambucano. He left in 2010 for personal reasons, but in 2012 he stated he was interested in rejoining the club.

== Career statistics ==
Appearances and goals by club, season and competition
Club	Season	League			National cup (Note: Includes Copa do Brasil, Emperor's Cup, Emir Cup.)		League cup (Note: Includes J.League Cup, Sheikh Jassem Cup.)		Continental		Total	
Club	Season	Division	Apps	Goals	Apps	Goals	Apps	Goals	Apps	Goals	Apps	Goals
Goiás	1997	Série A	5	0							5	0
Goiás	1998	Série A	20	10							20	10
Goiás	1999	Série B	29	5							29	5
Goiás	2000	Série A	24	5							24	5
Goiás	2001	Série A	26	7							26	7
Goiás	2002	Série A	25	11							25	11
Goiás	2003	Série A	41	12							41	12
Goiás	Total		170	55							170	55
Shimizu S-Pulse	2004	J1 League	29	9	0	0	7	1	–		36	10
Gamba Osaka	2005	J1 League	33	33	2	2	11	6	–		46	41
Cruzeiro	2006	Série A	1	0							1	0
Cruzeiro	2007	Série A	14	5							14	5
Cruzeiro	Total		15	5							15	5
Al-Gharafa	2007–08	Stars League	27	27	3	4	4	3	4	2	38	36
Al-Gharafa	2008–09	Stars League	27	20	3	2	4	4	5	5	39	31
Al-Gharafa	2009–10	Stars League	21	15	0	0	12	17	6	5	39	37
Al-Gharafa	2010–11	Stars League	9	6	0	0	6	3	2	0	17	9
Al-Gharafa	Total		84	68	6	6	24	29	17	12	133	113
Career total			330	164	29	21	152	91	55	35	563	319

== Honours ==
- Goiás State League: 1998, 1999, 2000, 2002, 2003
- Brazilian League (2nd division): 1999
- Brazilian Center-West Cup: 2000, 2001, 2002
- J1 League: 2005
- Minas Gerais State League: 2006
- Qatar Stars League: 2007–08, 2008–09, 2009–10
- Qatari Stars Cup: 2009–10
- Emir of Qatar Cup: 2009
- Qatar Crown Prince Cup: 2009–10

Individual

- World's top scorer in 2005: 33 goals in 33 games, considered world's best striker in 2005 by the International Federation of Football History & Statistics (IFFHS).
- J. League MVP: 2005
- J. League Top Scorer: 2005
- J. League Best Eleven: 2005
- Japanese Footballer of the Year: 2005
- Qatari League Top Scorer: 2007–08
- Super Awards Best Player in Qatar Stars League: 2009
