= Al-Gharafa SC =

Association football club in Qatar

Al-Gharafa
- Full name: Al-Gharafa Sports Club
- Nickname: Al Fuhud (The Cheetahs)
- Founded: 6 June 1979; 47 years ago, as Al-Ittihad
- Ground: Thani bin Jassim Stadium
- Capacity: 21,175
- Chairman: Jassim bin Thamer
- Head coach: Pedro Martins
- League: Qatar Stars League
- 2025–26: Qatar Stars League, 4th of 12
- Website: algharafa.football
Home colours	Away colours	Third colours

Al-Gharafa Sports Club (Arabic: نادي الغرافة الرياضي) is a Qatari multi-sports club based in the Al Gharrafa district of Al Rayyan municipality. The club is best known for its football team, although it also has teams for other sports. The club was established on 6 June 1979 as Al-Ittihad and later officially incorporated into the Qatar Football Association on 23 September of that same year. The club was officially renamed to its current form in 2004 to better represent the district of Al-Gharafa, where the club is located.

The club was founded by Sheikh Mohammed bin Jassim Al Thani, Sheikh Hamad bin Jassim Al Thani, Sheikh Hamad bin Faisal Al Thani, Sheikh Ali bin Abdullah Al Thani and Saad Mohammed Al-Rumaihi. In a documentary produced by Al Kass sports channel about the history of the club, Sheikh Hamad bin Jassim mentioned that the idea was initially suggested by Saad Al-Rumaihi who was working as a sports journalist at the Al Raya newspaper.

== History ==
=== 1980–2000 ===
Al-Gharafa Sports Club was founded on 6 June 1979 and was formally created on 23 September 1979 as Al-Ittihad by the first president of the board of directors, Khalifa Bin Fahad Bin Mohammed Al Thani (1979–1982) under resolution no. 9. Al-Gharafa was founded with the intent of creating sports facilities for the youth in the Al Gharrafa region. It did not occur to the leaders that Al-Gharafa would become as tremendously successful as it is today. The name "Al-Ittihad", which when translated into English, means "United", was chosen in the spirit of the brotherhood and solidarity that characterized the club and its leaders. Yellow and blue were selected as the club colors due to the founders' endearment towards the Brazil national team. Al-Gharafa owes much of its success in the early years to the financial and material support of its Sheikh leaders.

As Al-Gharafa was established relatively late compared to other Qatari clubs at the time, it was sent to the Qatari 2nd Division. It dominated the league and won the title on its debut in the 1979/80 season with Egyptian coach Mahmoud Abu Rujaila, as well three more times, the second by defending the championship in the 1980/81 season, and the third in the 1983/84 season, which, subsequently, was the year that their youth team had also won the league. Their first foreign player was Faisal Hannan, a Sudanese footballer who agreed to a contract one year prior to the club's establishment. Additionally, they won the 1986/87 season of the 2nd Division, allowing them to play in the 1987–88 season of the Qatar Stars League. The club ended up winning its first Stars League title in 1991–92, breaking the 16-year deadlock between the three dominant Qatari clubs Al-Arabi, Al Sadd, and Al-Rayyan. Al-Gharafa's youth team also won the league a year later in the 1992/93 season. The club were runners-up in 1994 to Al-Arabi, before winning the Emir of Qatar Cup four times in a row, from 1995 to 1998, under coach Jamal Haji.

The club won the league for the second time in the 1997/98 season with 32 points after they edged Al-Rayyan by a margin of 3 points. Al-Rayyan finished runners-up, with Al Sadd in third place. The very next year they finished runners-up to Al-Wakrah SC, however, Al-Gharafa had the best goal difference.

=== 2000–2005 ===
On Friday, 28 April 2000, at Khalifa International Stadium, Al-Gharafa won their first Qatar Crown Prince Cup. The match had ended goalless before they beat Al-Rayyan 9–8 in a dramatic penalty shoot-out. They were led by Adel Khamis, the long-time captain of the team. Al-Gharafa also won the Crown Prince Cup in 2010 and 2011.

They won the league championship in the 2000–01 season by defeating Al Sadd in their last game on 1 May 2001 by a scoreline of 1–0. After the match, Tamim bin Hamad Al Thani, then chairman of the olympic committee, delivered an award to Adel Khamis, as well as gold medals to the whole team and a sum of 500,000 Qatari riyals to the club. Rachid Amrane also won the league top goalscorer with a tally of 16 goals.

=== 2005–present ===
The Qatar Stars League was revamped in the 2004/05 season, with many clubs changing their names (including Al-Gharafa), as well as changing the number of games played each season from 18 to 27. The club won the league this year, with only 1 loss from 27 games, bringing their point tally to 66, which was 14 more than the runners-up, Al-Rayyan. They also won their first Sheikh Jassem Cup that year, on 12 September 2005, after defeating Al Ahli 2–1, courtesy of goals from Rodrigo and Fahad Al Shammari.

The next year they were unsuccessful in retaining the league championship, only finishing runners-up to Al Sadd. Although the next season, they won the league once more, besides scoring the highest number of goals in a season with 72 goals, mainly thanks to the efforts of Araújo, who scored 27 goals that season, shattering Gabriel Batistuta's record of 25. Last competition win for Al Gharafa was Qatari stars cup in 18/19

== Stadium ==
Al Gharafa plays its home games at Thani bin Jassim Stadium which is situated in the Al Gharafa suburb of Al Rayyan. The stadium holds 27,000 people and was built in 2003. The stadium hosted 2011 AFC Asian Cup and other international competitions. It is planned to expand the existing 27,000 capacity to 44,740 for the 2022 FIFA World Cup.

== Youth development ==
Al Gharafa has one of the largest youth development programmes in the country. It recruits youth players for every age bracket available, and has produced national team players from its academy. They regularly visit local schools, as well as hold school tournaments, and offer students trials. Currently there are approximately 350 players in the club's youth ranks, with 100 players in its academy, and 240 players in grass roots. Break-up is as follows (as of 2013):

Break-up of all youth players

Total number of youth players	Playing in national teams	In ASPIRE
350	35	45

Break-up of academy players

Category	U–19	U–17	U–15	U–14	Total no. of players
Number of players	25	25	25	25	100
Number of trainers	5	5	5	5	100
Training sessions/week	5	5	4	4	100

Break-up of grass–roots players

Category	U–12	U–11	U–10	U–9	U–8	U–7	U–6	U–15	Total no. of players
Number of players	30	30	30	30	30	30	30	20	240
Number of trainers	5	5	5	5	4	4	4	4	240
Training sessions/week	2	2	2	2	2	2	2	2	240

== Honours ==
- Qatari Stars League
  - Winners (7): 1991–92, 1997–98, 2001–02, 2004–05, 2007–08, 2008–09, 2009–10
- Qatari Second Division
  - Winners (4): 1979–80, 1981–82, 1983–84, 1986–87
- Emir of Qatar Cup
  - Winners (9): 1994–95, 1995–96, 1996–97, 1997–98, 2001–02, 2009, 2012, 2025, 2026
- Qatar Crown Prince Cup
  - Winners (3): 2000, 2010, 2011
- Qatari Stars Cup
  - Winners (3): 2009, 2017–18, 2018–19 (Record)
- Sheikh Jassim Cup
  - Winners (2): 2005, 2007
- Arab Cup Winners' Cup
  - Winners (1): 1999

=== Records & statistics ===
==== Other records ====
Season	Div.	Pos.	Pl.	W	D	L	GS	GA	GD	P	Domestic cups	AFC	Other Competitions
1995–96	QSL	5	16	4	4	8	22	21	+1	16			
1996–97	QSL	3	16	8	5	3	22	14	+8	29			
1997–98	QSL	1	16	10	5	1	23	13	+10	32			
1998–99	QSL	2	16	10	4	2	32	11	+21	34			
1999–2000	QSL	4	16	5	8	3	24	15	+9	23			
2000–01	QSL	5	16	8	4	4	27	19	+8	28			
2001–02	QSL	1	16	13	2	1	42	18	+24	41			
2002–03	QSL	2	18	8	8	2	29	21	+8	32			
2003–04	QSL	6	18	7	5	6	33	24	+9	26			
2004–05	QSL	1	27	20	6	1	71	23	+48	66			
2005–06	QSL	6	27	8	10	9	29	30	-1	34			
2006–07	QSL	2	27	11	10	6	51	41	+10	43			
2007–08	QSL	1	27	20	2	5	72	35	+37	62			
2008–09	QSL	1	27	17	5	5	56	33	+23	56			
2009–10	QSL	1	22	16	5	1	55	16	+39	53			
2010–11	QSL	2	22	14	1	7	51	31	+20	43			
2011–12	QSL	6	22	8	7	7	26	27	-1	31			
2012–13	QSL	6	22	8	6	8	26	28	-2	30			

== Performance in AFC competitions ==
AFC Champions League
Season	Round	Results	Team 2	Venue	Scorer(s)
8 March 2006	Group Round	0 – 2	(Iran) Saba Battery	Doha, Qatar	
22 March 2006	Group Round	0 – 2	(United Arab Emirates) Al-Wahda	Abu Dhabi, United Arab Emirates	
12 April 2006	Group Round	4 – 0	(Syria) Al-Karamah	Doha, Qatar	A'ala Hubail (2), Lawrence Quaye, Ismaiel Ali
26 April 2006	Group Round	1 – 3	(Syria) Al-Karamah	Homs, Syria	Lawrence Quaye
3 May 2006	Group Round	1 – 4	(Iran) Saba Battery	Tehran, Iran	Abdulla Al-Mazroa
17 May 2006	Group Round	5 – 3	(United Arab Emirates) Al-Wahda	Doha, Qatar	A'ala Hubail (3), Fahad Al Shammari, Sergio Ricardo
12 March 2008	Group Round	1 – 1	(Iraq) Arbil	Zarqa, Jordan	Araújo
19 March 2008	Group Round	2 – 2	(Uzbekistan) Pakhtakor	Doha, Qatar	Younis Mahmoud, Araújo
9 April 2008	Group Round	0 – 1	Al Qadisiya Kuwait	Kuwait City, Kuwait	
23 April 2008	Group Round	0 – 1	Al Qadisiya Kuwait	Doha, Qatar	
7 May 2008	Group Round	0 – 1	(Iraq) Arbil	Doha, Qatar	
21 May 2008	Group Round	0 – 2	(Uzbekistan) Pakhtakor	Tashkent, Uzbekistan	
10 March 2009	Group Round	1 – 3	(Saudi Arabia) Al-Shabab	Doha, Qatar	Araújo
17 March 2009	Group Round	2 – 0	(United Arab Emirates) Sharjah	Sharjah, United Arab Emirates	Nasser Kamil, Araújo
8 April 2009	Group Round	1 – 3	(Iran) Persepolis	Tehran, Iran	Fernandão
21 April 2009	Group Round	5 – 1	(Iran) Persepolis	Doha, Qatar	Fernandão, Araújo (3), Nashat Akram
6 May 2009	Group Round	0 – 1	(Saudi Arabia) Al-Shabab	Riyadh, Saudi Arabia	
23 February 2010	Group Round	2 – 1	(United Arab Emirates) Al-Jazira	Abu Dhabi, United Arab Emirates	Otmane El Assas, Younis Mahmoud
9 March 2010	Group Round	3 – 2	(Saudi Arabia) Al-Ahli	Doha, Qatar	Mirghani Al Zain, Saad Al-Shammari, Araújo
23 March 2010	Group Round	0 – 3	(Iran) Esteghlal	Tehran, Iran	
31 March 2010	Group Round	1 – 1	(Iran) Esteghlal	Doha, Qatar	Younis Mahmoud
14 April 2010	Group Round	4 – 2	(United Arab Emirates) Al-Jazira	Doha, Qatar	Araújo (3), Otmane El Assas
28 April 2010	Group Round	1 – 0	(Saudi Arabia) Al-Ahli	Jeddah, Saudi Arabia	Nasser Kamil
11 May 2010	Round of 16	1 – 0	(Uzbekistan) Pakhtakor	Doha, Qatar	Araújo
15 September 2010	Quarter-final	0 – 3	(Saudi Arabia) Al-Hilal	Riyadh, Saudi Arabia	
22 September 2010	Quarter-final	4 – 2	(Saudi Arabia) Al-Hilal	Doha, Qatar	Mirghani Al Zain, Younis Mahmoud (2), Otmane El Assas
1 March 2011	Group Round	0 – 0	(United Arab Emirates) Al-Jazira	Abu Dhabi, United Arab Emirates	
15 March 2011	Group Round	0 – 1	(Saudi Arabia) Al-Hilal	Doha, Qatar	
5 April 2011	Group Round	0 – 2	(Iran) Sepahan	Isfahan, Iran	
29 April 2011	Group Round	1 – 0	(Iran) Sepahan	Doha, Qatar	Amara Diané
4 May 2011	Group Round	5 – 2	(United Arab Emirates) Al-Jazira	Doha, Qatar	Younis Mahmoud (3), Amara Diané, Mirghani Al Zain
11 May 2011	Group Round	0 – 2	(Saudi Arabia) Al-Hilal	Riyadh, Saudi Arabia	

== Players ==
As of 14 September 2026

=== First team ===
Note: Flags indicate national team as defined under FIFA eligibility rules; some limited exceptions apply. Players may hold more than one non-FIFA nationality.

No.	Pos.	Nation	Player
1	GK	SEN	Khalifa Ababacar
2	DF	QAT	Abdulrahman Al-Rashidi
3	FW	QAT	Mohammed Muntari
4	DF	SEN	Seydou Sano
5	DF	QAT	Mostafa Essam
6	DF	QAT	Dame Traoré
7	MF	ROU	Florinel Coman
8	MF	ALG	Yacine Brahimi
9	FW	CMR	Frank Magri
10	MF	ALG	Ismaël Bennacer
11	MF	QAT	Amro Surag
13	MF	TUN	Ferjani Sassi (captain)
15	MF	SYR	Yousef Al-Khalif
16	MF	QAT	Jamil Friakh

No.	Pos.	Nation	Player
18	DF	QAT	Ayoub Al-Oui
19	FW	QAT	Yousef Saeed
20	DF	KOR	Jang Hyun-soo
22	MF	SOM	Abdirashid Saeed
23	DF	QAT	Saifeldeen Fadlalla
26	DF	QAT	Rayyan Al-Ali
27	DF	JAM	Mason Holgate
29	MF	URU	Fabricio Díaz
31	GK	ENG	Ahmed Kone
34	GK	QAT	Mahmood Gamal
90	FW	PLE	Alaa Aldeen Hassan
96	MF	ALG	Adam Ounas
97	MF	QAT	Amjad Nassar
99	MF	PLE	Jamal Hamed

=== Out on loan ===
Note: Flags indicate national team as defined under FIFA eligibility rules; some limited exceptions apply. Players may hold more than one non-FIFA nationality.

No. / Pos. / Nation / Player; 17 / FW / CMR / Ayuck Cosmas (at Al-Markhiya)	No. / Pos. / Nation / Player; 32 / DF / ARG / Matías Nani (at Al-Sailiya)

== Notable players ==
This list includes players whom have made significant contributions to their national team and to the club. At least 100 caps for the club or 70 caps for their national team is needed to be considered for inclusion. Updated 28 March 2016.

Domestic players

- (Qatar) Hamad Shami – 242 caps for Al Gharafa
- (Qatar) Saad Al-Shammari – 229 caps for Al Gharafa
- (Qatar) Lawrence Quaye – 221 caps for Al Gharafa
- (Qatar) Fahad Al Shammari – 203 caps for Al Gharafa
- (Qatar) Qasem Burhan – 193 caps for Al Gharafa
- Bilal Mohammed – 180 caps for Al Gharafa, 108 caps for Qatar
- (Qatar) Abdulaziz Ali – 147 caps for Al Gharafa
- (Qatar) George Kwasi – 132 caps for Al Gharafa
- (Qatar) Ibrahim Al-Ghanim – 114 caps for Al Gharafa
- (Qatar) Yousuf Adam Mahmoud – 114 caps for Al Gharafa
- Adel Khamis – 102 caps for Qatar
- Sebastián Soria – 123 caps for Qatar

Foreign players

- Paulo Wanchope – 73 caps for Costa Rica
- Otmane El Assas – 174 caps for Al Gharafa and 13 caps for Morocco
- Younis Mahmoud – 148 caps for Iraq (record)
- Wesley Sneijder – 134 caps for The Netherlands (record)
- Fawzi Bashir – 124 caps for Oman
- Marcel Desailly – 116 caps for France
- Husain Ali – 101 caps for Bahrain
- Mohamed Husain – 161 caps for Bahrain (record)
- Mark Bresciano – 84 caps for Australia
- Ze Roberto – 84 caps for Brazil
- Juninho Pernambucano – 40 caps for Brazil
- Vladimír Weiss – 74 caps for Slovakia
- Radhi Shenaishil – 80 caps for Iraq
- Hector Moreno – 122 caps for Mexico
- (Brazil) Araújo – 113 caps for Al Gharafa

== Personnel ==
As of 1 November 2026

Coaching Staff
Head Coach	(Portugal) Pedro Martins
Assistant Coach	(Portugal) Rui Pedro
Goalkeeper Coach	(Portugal) Peterson Peçanha
Conditioning Coach	(Portugal) António Henriques
Fitness Coach	(Portugal) Pedro Brito
Assistant Fitness Coach	(Iran) Yousef Daneshyar
Match Analyst	(Morocco) Nabil Haiz
Match Analyst	(Portugal) Luís Lobo
Doctor	(Tunisia) Mourad Mokrani
Physiotherapist	(Tunisia) Aymen Triki
Sports Scientist	(France) Alex Mendes
Masseur	(Brazil) Amilton Apolinário (Brazil) Thadeu Reis
Team Manager	(Qatar) Mugib Hamid Gamer
Operations Manager	(Scotland) Laith Al-Naeme

== Club officials ==
=== Management ===
Position	Staff
President	Sh. Hamad bin Thamer Al Thani
Vice-President	Sh. Khalid bin Ahmed Al Thani
Treasurer	Sh. Thani bin Thamer Al Thani
General Secretary	Jassem Al Mansouri
Vice Secretary	Ahmed Al Shehhi
Board member	Sh. Abdulaziz bin Jassim Al Thani
General Secretary	Sh. Hamad bin Mohammed Al Thani
General Secretary	Sh. Abdullah bin Khalifa Al Thani
General Secretary	Sh. Abdullah bin Hamad Al Thani

Last updated: 18 December 2014
Source: Board of Directors

== Managerial history ==
As of 14 May 2023

- (Sudan) Ibrahim Mohammed Ali "Ibrahoma" (1979)
- (Egypt) Mahmoud Abou-Regaila (c. 1979)
- (Somalia) Hassan Afif (1986–87)
- (Qatar) Saeed Al Missned (1989)
- (Brazil) Sérgio Cosme (1989–90)
- (Serbia) Zoran Đorđević (1991)
- (Brazil) Celso Roth (1992)
- (Bosnia and Herzegovina) Džemal Hadžiabdić (1 Jan 1992 – 30 June 1999)
- (Netherlands) René Meulensteen (1 July 1999 – 30 June 2000)
- (Bosnia and Herzegovina) Mirsad Fazlić (2000–01)
- (Austria) Josef Hickersberger (1 July 2001 – 30 June 2002)
- (France) Christian Gourcuff (1 July 2002 – 30 June 2003)
- (Belgium) Walter Meeuws (July 2003 – Dec 2003)
- (Portugal) Carlos Alhinho (Dec 2003 – March 2004)
- (Netherlands) Remco Boere (March 2004 – 30 June 2004)
- (France) Bruno Metsu (1 July 2004 – 30 June 2005)
- (Iraq) Harres Mohammed ^{1} (March 2006 – April 2006)
- (France) Michel Rouquette (April 2006 – Oct 2006)
- (Germany) Wolfgang Sidka (1 December 2006 – March 2007)
- (Tunisia) Youssef Zouaoui (March 2007 – July 2007)
- (Germany) Edi Stöhr (1 July 2007 – 25 March 2008)
- (Brazil) Marcos Paquetá (March 2008 – July 2009)
- (Brazil) Caio Júnior (1 July 2009 – 13 March 2011)
- (Brazil) Leonardo Vitorino ^{1} (March 2011 – March 2012)
- (France) Bruno Metsu (16 March 2010 – 14 March 2011)
- (Brazil) Paulo Silas (15 March 2012 – 27 November 2012)
- (Tunisia) Habib Sadegh ^{1} (Nov 2012 – Dec 2012)
- (France) Alain Perrin (20 Dec 2012 – 21 February 2013)
- (Tunisia) Habib Sadegh ^{1} (Feb 2013 – Aug 2013)
- (Brazil) Zico (2 Aug 2013 – 29 January 2014)
- (Tunisia) Habib Sadegh ^{1} (29 Jan 2014 – 7 February 2014)
- (Uruguay) Diego Aguirre (7 Feb 2014 – 7 June 2014)
- (Brazil) Marcos Paquetá (7 June 2014 – 6 June 2015)
- (Brazil) Péricles Chamusca (6 June 2015 – 30 December 2015)
- (Portugal) Pedro Caixinha (30 Dec 2015 – 9 March 2017)
- (Tunisia) Habib Sadegh ^{1} (2017)
- (France) Jean Fernandez (2017)
- (Turkey) Bülent Uygun (2017–2018)
- (France) Christian Gourcuff (19 May 2018 – 3 June 2019)
- (Serbia) Slaviša Jokanović (17 Jun 2019 – 27 May 2021)
- (Italy) Andrea Stramaccioni (1 Jul 2021 – 31 Oct 2022)
- (Portugal) Pedro Martins (7 Nov 2022 – present)

Notes

- Note 1 denotes caretaker role
