= 2011–12 Qatar Stars League =

48th season of top-tier football league in Qatar

Qatar Stars League
- Season: 2011–12
- Champions: Lekhwiya
- Relegated: Al Ahli
- AFC Champions League: Lekhwiya; Al-Gharafa; El Jaish; Al-Rayyan
- Matches: 132
- Goals: 371 (2.81 per match)
- Top goalscorer: (Brazil) Adriano (18 goals)
- Biggest home win: Al-Rayyan 8-2 Qatar SC (7 April 2012)
- Biggest away win: Al Kharaitiyat 0–6 El Jaish (2 February 2012)
- Highest scoring: Al-Rayyan 8-2 Qatar SC (7 April 2012)
- Longest winning run: 5 games El Jaish
- Longest unbeaten run: 9 games Al-Rayyan
- Longest losing run: 11 games Al Ahli

The 2011–12 Qatar Stars League was the 39th edition of top-level football championship in Qatar. The season started on 1 September 2011 and finished on 13 April 2012. Lekhwiya were the defending champions.

== Teams ==
Al-Sailiya were relegated to the second-level league after finishing bottom in the last season campaign.

El Jaish were promoted as the 2nd level champions.

=== Stadia and locations ===
Locations of teams in the 2011-12 Qatari League

Club	City/Town	Stadium	Capacity
Al Ahli	Doha	Hamad bin Khalifa Stadium	20,000
Al-Arabi	Doha	Grand Hamad Stadium	15,000
Al-Gharafa	Al Gharrafa	Thani bin Jassim Stadium	27,000
Al Kharaitiyat	Al Kharaitiyat	Ahmad bin Ali Stadium	27,000
Al-Khor	Al Khor	Al-Khor SC Stadium	20,000
Al-Rayyan	Al Rayyan	Ahmad bin Ali Stadium	27,000
Al Sadd	Doha	Jassim bin Hamad Stadium	15,000
Al-Wakrah	Al Wakrah	Al Janoub Stadium	20,000
El Jaish	Duhail	Ahmad bin Ali Stadium	27,000
Lekhwiya	Doha	Suheim bin Hamad Stadium	20,000
Qatar SC	Doha	Suheim bin Hamad Stadium	20,000
Umm Salal	Umm Salal	Thani bin Jassim Stadium	27,000

=== Personnel and kits ===
Note: Flags indicate national team as has been defined under FIFA eligibility rules. Players may hold more than one non-FIFA nationality.

Team	Manager	Captain	Kit manufacturer	Shirt sponsor
Al Ahli	(France) Bernard Simondi	(Qatar) Abdullah Mostafa	Nike	Ahli Co.
Al-Arabi	(France) Pierre Lechantre	(Iran) Hadi Aghily	Adidas	QPM
Al-Gharafa	(Brazil) Paulo Silas (caretaker)	(Morocco) Otmane El Assas	Erreà	Vodafone
Al Kharaitiyat	(France) Laurent Banide	(Bahrain) Jaycee John	BURRDA	Al-Khuratiyat Co.
Al-Khor	(France) Alain Perrin	(Qatar) Mustafa Jalal	Adidas	Qatar Airways
Al-Rayyan	(Uruguay) Diego Aguirre	(Qatar) Fábio César	Adidas	Rayan Co.
Al Sadd	(Uruguay) Jorge Fossati	(Qatar) Abdulla Koni	BURRDA	Vodafone
Al-Wakrah	(Iraq) Adnan Dirjal	(Iraq) Ali Rehema	Nike	Opel
El Jaish	(Brazil) Péricles Chamusca	(Algeria) Karim Ziani	Nike	Masrat Rayan
Lekhwiya	(Algeria) Djamel Belmadi	(Ivory Coast) Bakari Koné	BURRDA	Masrat Rayan
Qatar SC	(Morocco) Saïd Chiba	(Qatar) Sebastián Soria	Adidas	QatarEnergy
Umm Salal	(France) Gérard Gili	(Brazil) Magno Alves	Nike	Global Sports

=== Managerial changes ===
Team	Outgoing manager	Manner of departure	Date of vacancy	Position in table	Incoming manager	Date of appointment
Al-Rayyan	(Brazil) Paulo Autuori	Contract expired	28 July 2011	Pre-season	(Uruguay) Diego Aguirre	27 August 2011
Qatar SC	(Brazil) Sebastião Lazaroni	Resigned	7 August 2011	Pre-season	(Morocco) Saïd Chiba	10 August 2011
Al Kharaitiyat	(France) Bernard Simondi	Contract expired	13 August 2011	Pre-season	(Tunisia) Lotfi Benzarti	22 August 2011
Al Ahli	(Qatar) Abdullah Mubarak	Mutual consent	27 November 2011	12th	(France) Bernard Simondi	28 November 2011
Umm Salal	(Morocco) Hassan Harmatallah	Sacked	15 December 2011	12th	(France) Gérard Gili	16 December 2011
Al Kharaitiyat	(Tunisia) Lotfi Benzarti	Resigned	30 December 2011	11th	(France) Laurent Banide	1 January 2012
Al-Arabi	(Brazil) Paulo Silas	Sacked	2 January 2012	9th	(Qatar) Abdullah Saad (caretaker)	2 January 2012
Al-Gharafa	(France) Bruno Metsu	Sacked	15 March 2012	7th	(Brazil) Paulo Silas (caretaker)	15 March 2012
Al-Arabi	(Qatar) Abdullah Saad	Caretaker role ended	17 March 2012	8th	(France) Pierre Lechantre	17 March 2012

=== Foreign players ===
Club	Player 1	Player 2	Player 3	AFC player	Former players
Al Ahli	(Brazil) Ewerthon	(Democratic Republic of the Congo) Dioko Kaluyituka	(Morocco) Hicham Aboucherouane	(Uzbekistan) Shavkat Mullajanov	(Sweden) Christian Wilhelmsson
Al-Arabi	(Argentina) Leonardo Pisculichi	(Ghana) Ernest Papa Arko	(Togo) Arafat Djako	(Iran) Hadi Aghily	(Brazil) Vandinho (Brazil) Wanderley (Morocco) Mohamed Chihani
Al-Gharafa	(Brazil) Diego Tardelli	(Ivory Coast) Aruna Dindane	(Morocco) Otmane El Assas	(Iran) Farhad Majidi	(Brazil) Edmílson (Brazil) Zé Roberto (Iran) Mohammad Reza Khalatbari
Al Kharaitiyat	(Burkina Faso) Yahia Kébé	(Morocco) Jamal Alioui	(Nigeria) Onyekachi Okonkwo	(Bahrain) Jaycee John Okwunwanne	(Mozambique) Dario Khan
Al-Khor	(Algeria) Mourad Meghni	(Brazil) Júlio César	(Brazil) Madson	(Jordan) Hassan Abdel-Fattah	(Burkina Faso) Moumouni Dagano (Iraq) Salam Shaker (Norway) Pa-Modou Kah (Poland) Ebi Smolarek
Al-Rayyan	(Brazil) Afonso Alves	(Brazil) Leandro	(Brazil) Rodrigo Tabata	(South Korea) Cho Yong-hyung	(Brazil) Moisés Moura
Al Sadd	(Algeria) Nadir Belhadj	(Ivory Coast) Abdul Kader Keïta	(Senegal) Mamadou Niang	(South Korea) Lee Jung-soo	
Al-Wakrah	(Iraq) Nashat Akram	(Morocco) Anouar Diba	(Netherlands) Saïd Boutahar	(Iraq) Younis Mahmoud	(Iraq) Ali Rehema (Iraq) Alaa Abdul-Zahra
El Jaish	(Algeria) Karim Ziani	(Brazil) Adriano	(Brazil) Anderson Martins	(Oman) Ahmed Hadid Al-Mukhaini	(Bahrain) Hussain Ali Baba
Lekhwiya	(Algeria) Madjid Bougherra	(Burkina Faso) Moumouni Dagano	(Ivory Coast) Bakari Koné	(South Korea) Nam Tae-hee	(Iraq) Nashat Akram (Ivory Coast) Aruna Dindane (Ivory Coast) Kanga Akalé (Morocco) Anouar Diba
Qatar SC	(Brazil) Marcinho	(Morocco) Youssef Safri	(Norway) Pa-Modou Kah	(Iraq) Alaa Abdul-Zahra	(Iraq) Ali Hasan Kamal (Morocco) Abdeslam Ouaddou (Uzbekistan) Jasur Hasanov
Umm Salal	(Brazil) Caboré	(Brazil) Magno Alves	(Senegal) Mamadou Baïla Traoré	(Bahrain) Mohamed Husain	(Algeria) Mourad Meghni (Syria) Firas Al-Khatib

== League table ==
Pos	Team	Pld	W	D	L	GF	GA	GD	Pts	Qualification or relegation
1	Lekhwiya (C)	22	12	7	3	36	16	+20	43	2013 AFC Champions League Group stage
2	El Jaish	22	12	5	5	48	24	+24	41	2013 AFC Champions League Group stage
3	Al-Rayyan	22	10	9	3	49	26	+23	39	2013 AFC Champions League Group stage
4	Al Sadd	22	10	6	6	35	24	+11	36	
5	Al-Khor	22	9	5	8	30	29	+1	32	
6	Al-Gharafa	22	8	7	7	26	27	−1	31	2013 AFC Champions League Group stage (Note: Al-Gharafa secured qualification for the 2013 AFC Champions League through winning the 2012 Emir of Qatar Cup)
7	Al-Wakrah	22	8	4	10	30	37	−7	28	
8	Al Kharaitiyat	22	5	10	7	23	34	−11	25	
9	Al-Arabi	22	4	12	6	19	28	−9	24	
10	Qatar SC	22	6	6	10	32	46	−14	24	
11	Umm Salal (O)	22	4	8	10	20	32	−12	20	Promotion/relegation playoff
12	Al Ahli (R)	22	3	3	16	23	49	−26	12	Relegation

Updated to match(es) played on 13 April 2012. Source: RSSSF
Rules for classification: 1) points; 2) goal difference; 3) number of goals scored.
(C) Champions; (O) Play-off winners; (R) Relegated

=== Relegation playoff ===
20 April 2012
18:45 (UTC +3)

Umm Salal (Qatar)	1 - 0 (a.e.t.)	(Qatar) Muaither
Magno Alves 92'

Ahmad bin Ali Stadium, Al Rayyan
Referee: Khamis Al Kuwari (Qatar)

== Fixtures and results ==
Home \ Away	SAD	RAY	GHA	QSC	UMM	KHO	WAK	KHA	ARA	JAI	LEK	AHL
Al Sadd		0–0	0–0	3–3	4–1	3–1	3–1	1–1	4–1	1–1	1–2	1–0
Al-Rayyan	2–1		1–1	2–2	0–0	0–1	1–0	2–2	3–0	4–4	3–1	3–0
Al-Gharafa	3–1	1–5		2–0	0–1	0–2	2–1	0–0	1–1	1–0	0–0	2–2
Qatar SC	1–0	2–8	0–2		2–1	2–1	1–2	3–0	3–3	1–2	0–0	1–0
Umm Salal	1–3	1–1	1–2	4–3		1–2	0–0	1–1	1–1	1–0	0–0	3–0
Al-Khor	1–1	0–0	2–1	0–0	2–0		2–3	1–2	2–2	0–2	0–2	0–1
Al-Wakrah	0–2	1–3	1–0	5–1	3–0	1–1		2–1	0–1	1–6	0–1	2–2
Al Kharaitiyat	0–1	1–4	2–3	2–1	2–1	1–3	0–0		0–0	0–6	1–1	2–1
Al-Arabi	1–0	1–1	0–0	0–0	0–0	2–3	3–2	0–0		0–3	1–1	2–0
El Jaish	2–1	3–2	4–1	3–2	0–0	0–2	4–0	1–1	1–0		2–3	1–2
Lekhwiya	0–1	2–1	2–0	3–0	3–1	4–0	1–2	1–1	3–0	1–1		1–0
Al Ahli	2–3	2–3	1–4	3–4	3–1	1–3	2–3	1–4	0–0	0–2	0–4	

Legend: Blue = home team win; Yellow = draw; Red = away team win.

== Statistics ==
=== Top goalscorers ===
As of April 13, 2012

Rank	Scorer	Club	Goals
1	(Brazil) Adriano	El Jaish	18
2	(Brazil) Rodrigo Tabata	Al-Rayyan	17
3	(Brazil) Afonso Alves	Al-Rayyan	15
4	(Burkina Faso) Moumouni Dagano	Al Khor / Lekhwiya	12
4	(Democratic Republic of the Congo) Dioko Kaluyituka	Al Ahli	12
6	(Brazil) Caboré	Umm Salal	10
6	(Croatia) Wagner Ribeiro	El Jaish	10
8	(Burkina Faso) Yahia Kébé	Al Kharaitiyat	9
8	(Netherlands) Saïd Boutahar	Al-Wakrah	9
8	(Qatar) Sebastián Soria	Qatar SC	9

=== Top assisters ===
As of April 13, 2012

Rank	Scorer	Club	Assists
1	(Algeria) Karim Ziani	El Jaish	13
2	(Brazil) Rodrigo Tabata	Al-Rayyan	9
3	(Algeria) Nadir Belhadj	Al Sadd	8
4	(Morocco) Hicham Aboucherouane	Al Ahli	5
4	(Morocco) Youssef Safri	Qatar SC	5
4	(Qatar) Mosaab Mahmoud	Al-Khor	5
4	(South Korea) Nam Tae-hee	Lekhwiya	5
8	(Democratic Republic of the Congo) Tresor Kangambu	Al-Wakrah	4
8	(Nigeria) Onyekachi Okonkwo	Al Kharaitiyat	4
8	(Qatar) Abdulgadir Ilyas Bakur	El Jaish	4

=== Disciplinary statistics ===
As of April 13, 2012

- Yellow card = 1 point
- Red card = 3 points

Rank	Player	Club	Yellow cards	Red cards	Points
1	(Qatar) Daniel Goumou	Al-Rayyan	9	1	12
2	(Qatar) Ibrahim Al-Ghanim	Al-Gharafa	5	2	11
3	(Morocco) Youssef Safri	Qatar SC	7	1	10
3	(Qatar) Sebastián Soria	Qatar SC	7	1	10
3	(Uzbekistan) Shavkat Mullajanov	Al Ahli	7	1	10
6	(Norway) Pa-Modou Kah	Al-Khor / Qatar SC	6	1	9
6	(Tunisia) Mohammad Mothnani	El Jaish	6	1	9
8	(Morocco) Abdeslam Ouaddou	Qatar SC	5	1	8
8	(Morocco) Otmane El Assas	Al-Gharafa	5	1	8
10	(Brazil) Caboré	Umm Salal	4	1	7
10	(Ethiopia) Khalid Jaberti	Umm Salal	4	1	7
10	(Iraq) Ali Hasan Kamal	Qatar SC	4	1	7
10	(Qatar) Mostafa Mido	Qatar SC	4	1	7

== See also ==
- List of Qatari football transfers summer 2011–12
- List of Qatari football transfers winter 2011–12
- 2011–12 Qatar 2nd Division
- 2011 Sheikh Jassem Cup
- 2012 Emir of Qatar Cup
- 2012 Qatar Crown Prince Cup
