= 2013–14 Qatar Stars League =

50th season of top-tier football league in Qatar

Qatar Stars League
- Season: 2013–14
- Champions: Lekhwiya; 3rd title
- Relegated: Al-Rayyan; Muaither
- AFC Champions League: Lekhwiya; El Jaish; Al Sadd
- Matches: 182
- Goals: 553 (3.04 per match)
- Top goalscorer: (Democratic Republic of the Congo) Dioko Kaluyituka (22 goals)

The 2013–14 Qatar Stars League was the 41st edition of top-level football championship in Qatar. The season started on 1 September 2013 and ended on 11 April 2014. Al Sadd were the defending champions. Lekhwiya won its third league title with 53 points.

== League expansion ==
At the end of the previous season, it was announced that the 2013–14 season would feature 14 teams. The decision to increase the numbers of teams means Al-Sailiya, who finished bottom of the league table, will avoid relegation. Meanwhile, Muaither, who lost to Al-Arabi in the play-offs, will join as the 14th team. The Second Division and the reserve league also merged to create a stronger second tier. On the 6 October 2013 it was announced that the second tier would be known as the QatarGas League due to sponsorship reasons.

== Teams ==
Al Ahli were promoted as champions from the 2nd Division. They were joined by Muaither who came in second place and failed to win the end of season playoff against Al-Arabi but secured promotion due to the league expansion

=== Stadia and locations ===
Locations of teams in the 2013–14 Qatari League

Club	City/Town	Stadium	Capacity
Al Ahli	Doha	Hamad bin Khalifa Stadium	20,000
Al-Arabi	Doha	Grand Hamad Stadium	13,000
Al-Gharafa	Al Gharrafa	Thani bin Jassim Stadium	22,000
Al Kharaitiyat	Al Kharaitiyat	Al-Khor SC Stadium	13,000
Al-Khor	Al Khor	Al-Khor SC Stadium	13,000
Al-Rayyan	Al Rayyan	Ahmad bin Ali Stadium	22,000
Al Sadd	Doha	Jassim bin Hamad Stadium	18,000
Al-Sailiya	Doha	Ahmad bin Ali Stadium ^{1}	22,000
Al-Wakrah	Al Wakrah	Al Janoub Stadium	12,000
El Jaish	Duhail	Suheim bin Hamad Stadium	13,000
Lekhwiya	Doha	Abdullah bin Khalifa Stadium	15,000
Muaither	Muaither	Khalifa International Stadium	50,000
Qatar SC	Doha	Suheim bin Hamad Stadium	13,000
Umm Salal	Umm Salal	Grand Hamad Stadium	13,000

^{1} Al-Sailiya do not have a stadium of their own so they would share with Al-Rayyan.

=== Personnel ===
Note: Flags indicate national team as has been defined under FIFA eligibility rules. Players may hold more than one non-FIFA nationality.

Team	Head coach
Al Ahli	(Czech Republic) Milan Máčala
Al-Arabi	(Brazil) Paulo César Carpegiani
Al-Gharafa	(Uruguay) Diego Aguirre
Al Kharaitiyat	(France) Bertrand Marchand
Al-Khor	(Romania) László Bölöni
Al-Rayyan	(Spain) Manolo Jiménez
Al Sadd	(Morocco) Hussein Ammouta
Al-Sailiya	(Tunisia) Sami Trabelsi
Al-Wakrah	(Tunisia) Maher Kanzari
El Jaish	(Tunisia) Nabil Maâloul
Lekhwiya	(Belgium) Eric Gerets
Muaither	(Spain) Ladislas Lozano
Qatar SC	(Brazil) Sebastião Lazaroni
Umm Salal	(Turkey) Bülent Uygun

=== Managerial changes ===
Team	Outgoing manager	Manner of departure	Date of vacancy	Incoming manager	Date of appointment
Al Kharaitiyat	(France) Bernard Simondi	Contract expired	23 May 2013	(France) Bertrand Marchand	26 May 2013
Al-Sailiya	(Qatar) Abdullah Mubarak	Resigned	8 June 2013	(Tunisia) Sami Trabelsi	8 June 2013
Al-Arabi	(Morocco) Abdelaziz Bennij	Contract expired	8 June 2013	(Germany) Uli Stielike	8 June 2013
Al-Wakrah	(Bosnia and Herzegovina) Mehmed Baždarević	Contract expired	20 June 2013	(Iraq) Adnan Dirjal	20 June 2013
Umm Salal	(France) Alain Perrin	Sacked	30 September 2013	(France) Gérard Gili	30 September 2013
Al-Rayyan	(Uruguay) Diego Aguirre	Sacked	30 October 2013	(Spain) Manolo Jiménez	6 November 2013
Umm Salal	(France) Gérard Gili	Sacked	14 December 2013	(Turkey) Bülent Uygun	14 December 2013
El Jaish	(Romania) Răzvan Lucescu	Sacked	16 January 2014	(Tunisia) Nabil Maâloul	21 January 2014
Al-Arabi	(Germany) Uli Stielike	Sacked	28 January 2014	(Brazil) Paulo César Carpegiani	18 February 2014
Al-Gharafa	(Brazil) Zico	Mutual consent	29 January 2014	(Uruguay) Diego Aguirre	6 February 2014
Al-Wakrah	(Iraq) Adnan Dirjal	Resigned	12 March 2014	(Tunisia) Maher Kanzari	12 March 2014

=== Foreign players ===
Club	Player 1	Player 2	Player 3	AFC player	Former players
Al Ahli	(Bahrain) Abdullah Omar	(Democratic Republic of the Congo) Dioko Kaluyituka	(Democratic Republic of the Congo) Patou Kabangu	(Iran) Mojtaba Jabbari	(Iran) Ferydoon Zandi
Al-Arabi	(Algeria) Karim Ziani	(Brazil) Bruno Rangel	(Brazil) Wanderley	(Brazil) Orestes ^{1}	(Bahrain) Sayed Mohamed Adnan (Venezuela) Jesús Meza
Al-Gharafa	(Argentina) Lisandro López	(Brazil) Nenê	(Venezuela) Miku	(Australia) Mark Bresciano	
Al Kharaitiyat	(Brazil) Domingos	(Burkina Faso) Yahia Kébé	(Morocco) Youssef Kaddioui	(Bahrain) Jaycee John Okwunwanne	
Al-Khor	(Brazil) Júlio César	(Brazil) Madson	(Brazil) William	(Iraq) Salam Shaker	(Brazil) Bruno Mineiro (Iraq) Ali Hasan Kamal (Morocco) Faouzi Abdelghani
Al-Rayyan	(Argentina) Lucho González	(Nigeria) Kalu Uche	(Nigeria) Yakubu	(South Korea) Cho Yong-hyung	(Argentina) Juan Forlín (Brazil) Leandro Padovani (Brazil); Nilmar (Brazil) Rodrigo Tabata
Al Sadd	(Algeria) Nadir Belhadj	(Brazil) Rodrigo Tabata	(Spain) Raúl	(South Korea) Lee Jung-soo	(Brazil) Leandro (Senegal) Mamadou Niang
Al-Sailiya	(Brazil) Marcelo Camacho	(Burkina Faso) Moumouni Dagano	(Democratic Republic of the Congo) Yves Diba Ilunga	(Bahrain) Faouzi Aaish	(Brazil) Marcelo Tavares
Al-Wakrah	(Argentina) Sebastián Sáez	(Brazil) Michel	(Netherlands) Saïd Boutahar	(Iraq) Ali Rehema	(Morocco) Anouar Diba
El Jaish	(Brazil) Anderson Martins	(Brazil) Nilmar	(France) Jirès Kembo Ekoko	(South Korea) Go Seul-ki	(Ecuador) Christian Benítez (Nigeria) Kalu Uche (Oman) Ahmed Hadid Al-Mukhaini
Lekhwiya	(Algeria) Madjid Bougherra	(Slovakia) Vladimír Weiss	(Tunisia) Youssef Msakni	(South Korea) Nam Tae-hee	(Ivory Coast) Issiar Dia
Muaither	(Bolivia) Jhasmani Campos	(Brazil) Rodrigo	(South Korea) Cho Sung-hwan	(South Korea) Ha Sung-min	(The Gambia) Ebrahima Sawaneh (Montenegro) Đorđe Đikanović (Uzbekistan) Fozil Musaev
Qatar SC	(Brazil) Adriano	(Brazil) Douglão	(Brazil) Marcinho	(South Korea) Sin Jin-ho	
Umm Salal	(Brazil) Caboré	(Brazil) Victor Simões	(Morocco) Otmane El Assas	(Iran) Pejman Montazeri	(Australia) Sasa Ognenovski (Ivory Coast) Bakari Koné

^1 Orestes has East Timorese citizenship and was counted as Asian player.

== League table ==
Pos	Team	Pld	W	D	L	GF	GA	GD	Pts	Qualification or relegation
1	Lekhwiya (C)	26	16	5	5	55	30	+25	53	2015 AFC Champions League group stage
2	El Jaish	26	14	6	6	39	27	+12	48	2015 AFC Champions League second qualifying round
3	Al Sadd	26	13	8	5	54	30	+24	47	2015 AFC Champions League second qualifying round
4	Al-Sailiya	26	11	9	6	45	37	+8	42	
5	Al-Arabi	26	11	6	9	41	41	0	39	2015 GCC Champions League group stage
6	Al Ahli	26	9	7	10	48	50	−2	34	
7	Umm Salal	26	9	7	10	34	36	−2	34	
8	Al-Wakrah	26	8	8	10	41	40	+1	32	
9	Al-Gharafa	26	8	8	10	40	41	−1	32	
10	Qatar SC	26	8	7	11	34	40	−6	31	
11	Al-Khor	26	5	15	6	29	30	−1	30	
12	Al Kharaitiyat	26	7	8	11	31	34	−3	29	
13	Al-Rayyan (R)	26	7	8	11	34	40	−6	29	2015 GCC Champions League group stage and relegation to the Second Division
14	Muaither (R)	26	4	2	20	28	69	−41	14	Relegation to the 2014–15 Qatari Second Division

Updated to match(es) played on 11 April 2014. Source: RSSSF
Rules for classification: 1) points; 2) goal difference; 3) number of goals scored.
(C) Champions; (R) Relegated
