= 2008–09 Qatar Stars League =

45th season of top-tier football league in Qatar

Qatar Stars League
- Season: 2008–09
- Champions: Al-Gharafa
- AFC Champions League: Al-Gharafa; Al Sadd
- AFC Cup: Al-Rayyan
- Gulf Club Champions Cup: Al-Khor; Qatar SC
- Top goalscorer: (Brazil) Magno Alves (25 goals)

The 2008–09 Qatar Stars League season was the 36th edition of top level football in Qatar and started on the 13 September 2008.

== Overview ==
The season was played in 3 stages. The 2008–09 calendar released by the QFA saw the first phase run through 13 September till 23 November before phase two kicked off on 27 November to end on 7 February 2009. The final phase started on February 12 and concluded on April 17.

Ten teams played for the title of league champions with each outfit playing 27 matches. The last team in the standings was to be relegated until the QFA announced an expansion to the league for the following season.

The competition was played at the seven stadiums of Al Sadd, Al-Rayyan, Al-Gharafa, Al-Wakrah, Al-Khor, Qatar SC, and Al-Arabi.

Al-Gharafa won the title last season after pipping powerhouse Al Sadd into second place while Al-Shamal were relegated and their place in the top division would be taken up by Al Kharaitiyat.

=== League expansion ===
The league has slowly expanded since the turn of the decade, moving from 9 clubs to 10 clubs and then latest setup of 12 clubs for the next season campaign.

There are two divisions in the Qatari football structure and the league has previously seen one club promoted and relegated each year except in 'expansion' years.

It was announced on 15 April 2009 that no clubs would be relegated from the top flight due to expansion reasons. The announcement was made with only one game remaining.

== Teams ==
Club	City/Town	Stadium	Head coach	Last season	Notes
Al-Gharafa	Al Gharrafa	Thani bin Jassim Stadium	(Brazil) Marcos Paquetá	QSL defending champions	2009 AFC Champions League Qualifier
Al Sadd	Doha	Jassim bin Hamad Stadium	(Romania) Cosmin Olăroiu	2nd in QSL	
Umm Salal	Umm Salal	Thani bin Jassim Stadium	(France) Gérard Gili	3rd in QSL	2009 AFC Champions League Qualifier
Qatar SC	Doha	Suheim bin Hamad Stadium	(Brazil) Sebastião Lazaroni	4th in QSL	
Al-Rayyan	Al Rayyan	Ahmad bin Ali Stadium	(Brazil) Paulo Autuori	5th in QSL	
Al-Arabi	Doha	Grand Hamad Stadium	(Germany) Uli Stielike	6th in QSL	
Al-Khor	Al Khor	Al-Khor SC Stadium	(France) Bertrand Marchand	7th in QSL	2008 Gulf Club Champions Cup Qualifier
Al-Sailiya	Al Sailiya	Suheim bin Hamad Stadium	(Serbia) Nebojša Vučković	8th in QSL	
Al-Wakrah	Al Wakrah	Al Janoub Stadium	(Morocco) Mustapha Madih	9th in QSL	
Al Kharaitiyat	Al Kharaitiyat	Ahmad bin Ali Stadium	(Brazil) Arturzinho	Promoted from 2nd level	

=== Foreign players ===
Club	Player 1	Player 2	Player 3	Player 4	Player 5	AFC player	Former players
Al-Arabi	(Argentina) Leonardo Pisculichi	(Bahrain) Salman Isa	(Brazil) Kim	(Democratic Republic of the Congo) Lomana LuaLua	(Mali) Souleymane Keïta	(Oman) Mohammed Al-Balushi	(Iraq) Younis Mahmoud
Al-Gharafa	(Brazil) Clemerson	(Brazil) Fernandão	(Iraq) Nashat Akram	(Morocco) Otmane El Assas	(Switzerland) Hakan Yakin	(Iraq) Younis Mahmoud	(Algeria) Ahmed Madouni
Al-Khor	(Bahrain) Sayed Mohamed Adnan	(Burkina Faso) Moumouni Dagano	(Cameroon) Bill Tchato	(Iraq) Alaa Abdul-Zahra	(Tunisia) Kamel Zaiem	(Iraq) Salam Shaker	(Brazil) Fabrício Souza (Cameroon) Jean Paul Yontcha (Iraq) Mahdi Karim
Al Kharaitiyat	(Bahrain) Abdulla Baba Fatadi	(Brazil) Fabão	(Brazil) Rodolfo Soares	(Cameroon) Joseph-Désiré Job	(France) Sabri Lamouchi	(Oman) Ashraf Bait Taysir	(Benin) Oumar Tchomogo (Brazil) Irênio Soares (Brazil) Wílton Figueiredo (Iraq) Ali Hasan Kamal
Al-Rayyan	(Brazil) Aloísio Chulapa	(Brazil) Marcelo Tavares	(Ivory Coast) Amara Diané	(Oman) Amad Al-Hosni	(Senegal) Abasse Ba	(Oman) Hassan Mudhafar Al-Gheilani	(Brazil) Élton Arábia (Brazil) Ricardinho (Brazil) Roque Júnior
Al Sadd	(Brazil) Felipe	(Ecuador) Carlos Tenorio	(Ghana) Agyemang Opoku	(Guinea) Pascal Feindouno	(Oman) Khalifa Ayil Al-Noufali	(Oman) Mohammed Rabia Al-Noobi	(United Arab Emirates) Ismail Matar
Al-Sailiya	(Brazil) Alexandre	(Burkina Faso) Abdoulaye Cissé	(Cameroon) Jean-Emmanuel Effa Owona	(Cape Verde) Nando	(Oman) Ahmed Kano	(Oman) Badar Al-Maimani	(Sierra Leone) Mahmadu Alphajor Bah
Al-Wakrah	(Brazil) Wilsinho	(Iraq) Ali Rehema	(Morocco) Adil Ramzi	(Morocco) Anouar Diba	(Netherlands) Delano Hill	(Iraq) Karrar Jassim	(Netherlands) Elbekay Bouchiba
Qatar SC	(Brazil) Marcinho	(Brazil) Roger	(Iraq) Qusay Munir	(Morocco) Talal El Karkouri	(Morocco) Youssef Safri	(Saudi Arabia) Ahmed Al-Dokhi	
Umm Salal	(Brazil) Fabrício Souza	(Brazil) Magno Alves	(Brazil) Nivaldo	(Morocco) Aziz Ben Askar	(Senegal) Moussa N'Diaye	(Bahrain) Mohamed Husain	(Angola) Maurito (France) Sabri Lamouchi

== Final league table ==
Pos	Team	Pld	W	D	L	GF	GA	GD	Pts
1	Al-Gharafa	27	17	5	5	56	33	+23	56
2	Al Sadd	27	15	9	3	60	25	+35	54
3	Al-Rayyan	27	15	7	5	62	35	+27	52
4	Qatar SC	27	11	10	6	42	36	+6	43
5	Al-Khor	27	9	13	5	38	28	+10	40
6	Umm Salal	27	9	8	10	46	45	+1	35
7	Al-Arabi	27	8	5	14	37	51	−14	29
8	Al-Wakrah	27	8	3	16	32	56	−24	27
9	Al-Sailiya	27	5	5	17	31	58	−27	20
10	Al Kharaitiyat	27	3	6	18	19	59	−40	15

Source: RSSSF

Qatar Stars League
2008–09 winners

6th title

== Top scorers ==
25 goals

- (Brazil) Magno Alves (Umm Salal)

21 goals

- (Argentina) Leonardo Pisculichi (Al-Arabi)

20 goals

- (Brazil) Clemerson (Al-Gharafa)

19 goals

- (Ivory Coast) Amara Diané (Al-Rayyan)
- Sebastián Soria (Qatar SC)

15 goals

- (Qatar) Khalfan Ibrahim (Al Sadd)

13 goals

- (Ghana) Agyemang Opoku (Al Sadd)

11 goals

- (Bahrain) Sayed Mohamed Adnan (Al-Khor)
- (Cameroon) Jean-Emmanuel Effa Owona (Al-Sailiya)
- (Guinea) Pascal Feindouno (Al Sadd)
- (Oman) Amad Al-Hosni (Al-Rayyan)

10 goals

- (Brazil) Fernandão (Al-Gharafa)
- (Burkina Faso) Moumouni Dagano (Al-Khor)
- (Morocco) Anouar Diba (Al-Wakrah)
