= List of Qatari football transfers winter 2011–12 =

This is a list of Qatari football transfers for the 2011–12 winter transfer window by club. Only transfers of clubs in the Qatar Stars League are included.

The summer transfer window opened on 1 January 2012, although some transfers took place prior to that date. The window closed at midnight on 31 January 2012. Players without a club may join one at any time, either during or in between transfer windows.

== Qatar Stars League ==
=== Al Ahli ===
In: Note: Flags indicate national team as defined under FIFA eligibility rules; some limited exceptions apply. Players may hold more than one non-FIFA nationality.

No.	Pos.	Nation	Player
—	MF	SWE	Christian Wilhelmsson (on loan from (Saudi Arabia) Al Hilal)
—	MF	QAT	Ahmad Mousa (from Al-Wakrah)
—	FW	BRA	Ewerthon (from (Russia) FC Terek Grozny)

Out: Note: Flags indicate national team as defined under FIFA eligibility rules; some limited exceptions apply. Players may hold more than one non-FIFA nationality.

No.	Pos.	Nation	Player
10	MF	SWE	Christian Wilhelmsson (loan return to (Saudi Arabia) Al Hilal)

=== Al-Arabi ===
In: Note: Flags indicate national team as defined under FIFA eligibility rules; some limited exceptions apply. Players may hold more than one non-FIFA nationality.

No.	Pos.	Nation	Player
—	FW	GHA	Papa Arko (on loan from (Egypt) El-Geish)
—	FW	TOG	Arafat Djako (from (Russia) Anzhi)

Out: Note: Flags indicate national team as defined under FIFA eligibility rules; some limited exceptions apply. Players may hold more than one non-FIFA nationality.

No.	Pos.	Nation	Player
99	FW	BRA	Vandinho (released)
89	MF	QAT	Ziad Al Khatib (to El Jaish)

=== Al-Gharafa ===
In: Note: Flags indicate national team as defined under FIFA eligibility rules; some limited exceptions apply. Players may hold more than one non-FIFA nationality.

No.	Pos.	Nation	Player
70	FW	IRN	Farhad Majidi (on loan from (Iran) Esteghlal)
—	FW	BRA	Diego Tardelli (from (Russia) Anzhi)
—	FW	CIV	Aruna Dindane (from Lekhwiya)

Out: Note: Flags indicate national team as defined under FIFA eligibility rules; some limited exceptions apply. Players may hold more than one non-FIFA nationality.

No.	Pos.	Nation	Player
10	FW	IRN	Mohammad Reza Khalatbari (to (United Arab Emirates) Al Wasl)
8	MF	BRA	Zé Roberto (released)

=== Al Kharitiyath ===
In: Note: Flags indicate national team as defined under FIFA eligibility rules; some limited exceptions apply. Players may hold more than one non-FIFA nationality.

No.	Pos.	Nation	Player
—	DF	MOZ	Dario Khan (from (Mozambique) Liga Muçulmana de Maputo)

Out: Note: Flags indicate national team as defined under FIFA eligibility rules; some limited exceptions apply. Players may hold more than one non-FIFA nationality.

No.	Pos.	Nation	Player
44	MF	QAT	Hamad Al-Obeidi (loan return to Al Rayyan)
22	DF	MAR	Jamal Alioui (released)

=== Al-Khor ===
In: Note: Flags indicate national team as defined under FIFA eligibility rules; some limited exceptions apply. Players may hold more than one non-FIFA nationality.

No.	Pos.	Nation	Player
—	MF	BRA	Madson (on loan from (Brazil) Santos)
—	MF	JOR	Hassan Abdel-Fattah (from (Jordan) Al-Wahdat)
—	FW	QAT	Ibrahim Mohammed Awal (from Al Rayyan)
—	MF	BRA	Júlio César (from (United Arab Emirates) Al Shabab Al Arabi Club)
—	DF	QAT	Chehab Al Diri (from Al Rayyan)

Out: Note: Flags indicate national team as defined under FIFA eligibility rules; some limited exceptions apply. Players may hold more than one non-FIFA nationality.

No.	Pos.	Nation	Player
10	MF	QAT	Ibrahima Nadiya (to Al Rayyan)
9	FW	QAT	Ali Askar (to El Jaish)
11	FW	POL	Ebi Smolarek (to (Netherlands) ADO Den Haag)
9	FW	BFA	Moumouni Dagano (to Lekhwiya)
4	DF	NOR	Pa-Modou Kah (to Qatar SC)

=== Al Rayyan ===
In: Note: Flags indicate national team as defined under FIFA eligibility rules; some limited exceptions apply. Players may hold more than one non-FIFA nationality.

No.	Pos.	Nation	Player
—	MF	QAT	Ibrahima Nadiya (from Al-Khor)
—	MF	QAT	Hamad Al-Obeidi (loan return from Al Kharitiyath)
—	DF	QAT	Marcone (on loan from El Jaish)
—	FW	BRA	Leandro (on loan from Al Sadd)

Out: Note: Flags indicate national team as defined under FIFA eligibility rules; some limited exceptions apply. Players may hold more than one non-FIFA nationality.

No.	Pos.	Nation	Player
14	FW	QAT	Ibrahim Mohammed Awal (to Al-Khor)
24	DF	QAT	Chehab Al Diri (to Al-Khor)

=== Al Sadd ===
In: Note: Flags indicate national team as defined under FIFA eligibility rules; some limited exceptions apply. Players may hold more than one non-FIFA nationality.

No.	Pos.	Nation	Player
—	FW	SEN	Mamadou Niang (from (Turkey) Fenerbahçe)

Out: Note: Flags indicate national team as defined under FIFA eligibility rules; some limited exceptions apply. Players may hold more than one non-FIFA nationality.

No.	Pos.	Nation	Player
66	MF	QAT	Diab Al Annabi (on loan to El Jaish)
20	FW	QAT	Ali Afif (on loan to Lekhwiya)
9	FW	BRA	Leandro (on loan to Al Rayyan)

=== Al-Wakrah ===
In: Note: Flags indicate national team as defined under FIFA eligibility rules; some limited exceptions apply. Players may hold more than one non-FIFA nationality.

No.	Pos.	Nation	Player
—	DF	QAT	Mujeeb Hamid (from Umm Salal)
—	MF	IRQ	Nashat Akram (from free agent)

Out: Note: Flags indicate national team as defined under FIFA eligibility rules; some limited exceptions apply. Players may hold more than one non-FIFA nationality.

No.	Pos.	Nation	Player
17	FW	IRQ	Alaa Abdul-Zahra (to Qatar SC)
77	MF	QAT	Ahmad Mousa (to Al Ahli)
7	DF	SDN	Mohammed Muddather (to Lekhwiya)

=== El Jaish ===
In: Note: Flags indicate national team as defined under FIFA eligibility rules; some limited exceptions apply. Players may hold more than one non-FIFA nationality.

No.	Pos.	Nation	Player
—	MF	KSA	Mohammed Noor (on loan from (Saudi Arabia) Al-Ittihad)
—	FW	SDN	Tamer Jamal (from Umm Salal)
—	MF	QAT	Diab Al Annabi (on loan from Al Sadd)
—	FW	QAT	Ali Askar (from Al-Khor)
—	MF	QAT	Tariq Rashid Al Eid (from Umm Salal)
—	MF	QAT	Ziad Al Khatib (from Al-Arabi)

Out: Note: Flags indicate national team as defined under FIFA eligibility rules; some limited exceptions apply. Players may hold more than one non-FIFA nationality.

No.	Pos.	Nation	Player
7	MF	QAT	Mujtaba Jaafar (to Umm Salal)
16	FW	QAT	Mahir Bakur (to Umm Salal)
3	DF	BHR	Hussain Ali Baba (to Kuwait SC)
5	DF	QAT	Marcone (on loan to Al Rayyan)

=== Lekhwiya ===
In: Note: Flags indicate national team as defined under FIFA eligibility rules; some limited exceptions apply. Players may hold more than one non-FIFA nationality.

No.	Pos.	Nation	Player
—	MF	KOR	Nam Tae-Hee (from (France) Valenciennes FC)
—	MF	CIV	Kanga Akalé (from (France) RC Lens)
—	FW	QAT	Ali Afif (on loan from Al Sadd)
—	DF	SDN	Mohammed Muddather (from Al-Wakrah)
—	FW	BFA	Moumouni Dagano (from Al-Khor)

Out: Note: Flags indicate national team as defined under FIFA eligibility rules; some limited exceptions apply. Players may hold more than one non-FIFA nationality.

No.	Pos.	Nation	Player
16	DF	QAT	Mohammed al-Haj (to Umm Salal)
3	MF	JOR	Rami Fayez (on loan to Umm Salal)
8	MF	MAR	Anouar Diba (released)
25	MF	IRQ	Nashat Akram (released)
81	FW	CIV	Kanga Akalé (end of contract)
15	FW	CIV	Aruna Dindane (to Al-Gharafa)

=== Qatar SC ===
In: Note: Flags indicate national team as defined under FIFA eligibility rules; some limited exceptions apply. Players may hold more than one non-FIFA nationality.

No.	Pos.	Nation	Player
—	FW	IRQ	Alaa Abdul-Zahra (from Al-Wakrah)
—	MF	MAR	Anouar Diba (from Qatar SC)
—	DF	NOR	Pa-Modou Kah (from Al-Khor)

Out: Note: Flags indicate national team as defined under FIFA eligibility rules; some limited exceptions apply. Players may hold more than one non-FIFA nationality.

No.	Pos.	Nation	Player
19	MF	UZB	Jasur Hasanov (to (United Arab Emirates) Emirates Club)

=== Umm Salal ===
In: Note: Flags indicate national team as defined under FIFA eligibility rules; some limited exceptions apply. Players may hold more than one non-FIFA nationality.

No.	Pos.	Nation	Player
—	DF	QAT	Mohammed al-Haj (from Lekhwiya)
—	MF	JOR	Rami Fayez (on loan from Lekhwiya)
—	MF	QAT	Mujtaba Jaafar (from El Jaish)
—	FW	QAT	Mahir Bakur (from El Jaish)
—	FW	BRA	Magno Alves (from free agent)
—	MF	SEN	Mamadou Baila Traoré (from (Morocco) Raja Casablanca)

Out: Note: Flags indicate national team as defined under FIFA eligibility rules; some limited exceptions apply. Players may hold more than one non-FIFA nationality.

No.	Pos.	Nation	Player
9	FW	BFA	Aristide Bancé (loan return to (United Arab Emirates) Al-Ahli Dubai)
7	FW	SDN	Tamer Jamal (to El Jaish)
19	DF	QAT	Mujeeb Hamid (to Al-Wakrah)
10	FW	SYR	Firas Al Khatib (to (Kuwait) Qadsia SC)
77	MF	QAT	Tariq Rashid Al Eid (to El Jaish)
