= Abdulla Al-Kowari =

Qatari footballer (born 1988)

Abdulla Al-Kuwari
Personal information
- Full name: Abdulla Mohammed Al-Kuwari
- Date of birth: 16 June 1988 (age 38)
- Place of birth: Qatar
- Height: 1.68 m (5 ft 6 in)
- Position: Winger

Senior career*
Years	Team	Apps	(Gls)
2008–2015	Qatar		
2015–2016	Al Ahli		
2016–2017	Qatar		
2017–2018	Al Kharaitiyat		
- * Club domestic league appearances and goals

Abdullah Al Kuwari (Arabic:عبد الله الكواري) (born 26 June 1988) is a Qatari footballer.
