= Sulaiman Al Nassr =

Qatari footballer (born 1984)

Personal information
- Full name: Sulaiman Tarrar Al Nassr
- Date of birth: 27 October 1984 (age 42)
- Place of birth: Qatar
- Height: 1.71 m (5 ft 7 1/2 in)
- Position: Full-back

Youth career
- Al-Arabi

Senior career*
Years	Team	Apps	(Gls)
2004–2018	Al-Kharaitiyat		
- * Club domestic league appearances and goals

Sulaiman Al Nassr (Arabic:سليمان النصر; born 27 October 1984) is a Qatari footballer.
