= Abdullah Al-Battat =

Qatari footballer (born 1988)

Personal information
- Full name: Abdullah Abdurahman Al-Battat
- Date of birth: 3 January 1988 (age 38)
- Place of birth: Qatar
- Height: 1.76 m (5 ft 9 in)
- Position: Midfielder

Youth career
- Al-Kharaitiyat

Senior career*
Years	Team	Apps	(Gls)
2008–2017	Al-Kharaitiyat	164	(2)
2017–2018	Al-Khor	7	(0)

International career
2009	Qatar	1	(0)
- * Club domestic league appearances and goals

Abdullah Abdurahman Al-Battat (Arabic:عبد الله البطاط; born 3 January 1988) is a Qatari former professional footballer.

== International career ==
Al-Battat was born in Qatar and is of Palestinian descent. He has represented the Qatar national football team in a friendly 1–0 loss to North Korea on 30 December 2009.
