= 2003–04 FC Lorient season =

FC Lorient
2003–04 season
- President: Marcel Le Mentec
- Head coach: Christian Gourcuff
- Stadium: Stade du Moustoir
- Ligue 2: 4th
- Coupe de France: Round of 64
- Coupe de la Ligue: Round of 32
- Top goalscorer: League: Bakari Koné (9); All: Bakari Koné (11)
- Biggest win: Clermont 0–4 Lorient
- Biggest defeat: Lorient 0–5 Gueugnon

The 2003–04 season was the 78th season in the existence of FC Lorient and the club's second consecutive season in the second division of French football. In addition to the domestic league, FC Lorient participated in this season's editions of the Coupe de France and the Coupe de la Ligue.

== Competitions ==
=== Overall record ===
Competition	First match	Last match	Starting round	Final position	Record							
Competition	First match	Last match	Starting round	Final position	Pld	W	D	L	GF	GA	GD	Win %
Ligue 2	2 August 2003	22 May 2004	Matchday 1	4th	38	17	10	11	57	45	+12	44.74
Coupe de France	22 November 2003	3 January 2004	Seventh round	Round of 64	3	2	1	0	7	2	+5	66.67
Coupe de la Ligue	23 September 2003	28 October 2003	First round	Round of 32	2	0	1	1	0	2	−2	0.00
Total					43	19	12	12	64	49	+15	44.19

Source: Competitions

=== Ligue 2 ===
==== League table ====
Pos	Team	Pld	W	D	L	GF	GA	GD	Pts	Promotion or Relegation
2	Caen (P)	38	20	11	7	56	31	+25	71	Promotion to Ligue 1
3	Istres (P)	38	19	9	10	44	26	+18	66	Promotion to Ligue 1
4	Lorient	38	17	10	11	57	45	+12	61	
5	Sedan	38	15	15	8	42	31	+11	60	
6	Nancy	38	14	13	11	45	36	+9	55	

Source: Ligue 2
(P) Promoted

==== Results summary ====
Overall								Home						Away					
Pld	W	D	L	GF	GA	GD	Pts	W	D	L	GF	GA	GD	W	D	L	GF	GA	GD
38	17	10	11	57	45	+12	61	13	2	4	34	21	+13	4	8	7	23	24	−1

Source: Ligue 2

==== Results by round ====
Round	1	2	3	4	5	6	7	8	9	10	11	12	13	14	15	16	17	18	19	20	21	22	23	24	25	26	27	28	29	30	31	32	33	34	35	36	37	38
Ground	A	H	A	H	A	A	H	A	H	A	H	A	H	A	H	A	H	A	H	A	H	A	H	H	A	H	A	H	A	H	A	H	A	H	A	H	A	H
Result	D	W	L	W	D	L	W	L	W	L	W	L	W	W	W	D	W	D	W	L	W	D	L	L	L	D	W	W	D	L	W	D	D	W	D	W	W	L
Position	9	5	8	4	5	8	4	8	6	9	6	8	5	5	4	3	2	4	3	5	4	4	4	6	6	7	6	6	6	7	6	6	5	4	4	4	4	4

Source: Ligue 2
A = Away; H = Home; W = Win; D = Draw; L = Loss

==== Matches ====
2 August 2003 1	Gueugnon	1–1	Lorient	Gueugnon
--:-- CEST (UTC+2)				Stadium: Stade Jean Laville

10 August 2003 2	Lorient	2–0	Le Havre	Lorient
--:-- CEST (UTC+2)				Stadium: Stade du Moustoir

15 August 2003 3	Saint-Étienne	2–1	Lorient	Saint-Étienne
--:-- CEST (UTC+2)				Stadium: Stade Geoffroy-Guichard

19 August 2003 4	Lorient	2–0	Nancy	Lorient
--:-- CEST (UTC+2)				Stadium: Stade du Moustoir

23 August 2003 5	Châteauroux	2–2	Lorient	Châteauroux
--:-- CEST (UTC+2)				Stadium: Stade Gaston-Petit

30 August 2003 6	Créteil	1–0	Lorient	Créteil
--:-- CEST (UTC+2)				Stadium: Stade Dominique Duvauchelle

5 September 2003 7	Lorient	3–1	Amiens	Lorient
--:-- CEST (UTC+2)				Stadium: Stade du Moustoir

13 September 2003 8	Sedan	2–1	Lorient	Sedan
--:-- CEST (UTC+2)				Stadium: Stade Louis Dugauguez

20 September 2003 9	Lorient	3–1	Valence	Lorient
--:-- CEST (UTC+2)				Stadium: Stade du Moustoir

28 September 2003 10	Istres	1–0	Lorient	Istres
--:-- CEST (UTC+2)				Stadium: Stade Parsemain

4 October 2003 11	Lorient	2–0	Besançon	Lorient
--:-- CEST (UTC+2)				Stadium: Stade du Moustoir

18 October 2003 12	Caen	2–0	Lorient	Caen
--:-- CEST (UTC+2)				Stadium: Stade Michel d'Ornano

25 October 2003 13	Lorient	4–1	Rouen	Lorient
--:-- CEST (UTC+2)				Stadium: Stade du Moustoir

31 October 2003 14	Clermont	0–4	Lorient	Clermont-Ferrand
--:-- CET (UTC+1)				Stadium: Stade Gabriel Montpied

8 November 2003 15	Lorient	2–1	Grenoble	Lorient
--:-- CET (UTC+1)				Stadium: Stade du Moustoir

28 November 2003 16	Laval	2–2	Lorient	Laval
--:-- CET (UTC+1)				Stadium: Stade Francis Le Basser

4 December 2003 17	Lorient	1–0	Troyes	Lorient
--:-- CET (UTC+1)				Stadium: Stade du Moustoir

7 December 2003 18	Angers	1–1	Lorient	Angers
--:-- CET (UTC+1)				Stadium: Stade Raymond Kopa

20 December 2003 19	Lorient	4–2	Niort	Lorient
--:-- CET (UTC+1)				Stadium: Stade du Moustoir

11 January 2004 20	Le Havre	1–0	Lorient	Le Havre
--:-- CET (UTC+1)				Stadium: Stade Jules Deschaseaux

18 January 2004 21	Lorient	2–0	Saint-Étienne	Lorient
--:-- CET (UTC+1)				Stadium: Stade du Moustoir

2 February 2004 22	Nancy	1–1	Lorient	Tomblaine
--:-- CET (UTC+1)				Stadium: Stade Marcel Picot

7 February 2004 23	Lorient	0–1	Châteauroux	Lorient
--:-- CET (UTC+1)				Stadium: Stade du Moustoir

14 February 2004 24	Lorient	0–3	Créteil	Lorient
--:-- CET (UTC+1)				Stadium: Stade du Moustoir

22 February 2004 25	Amiens	1–0	Lorient	Amiens
--:-- CET (UTC+1)				Stadium: Stade de la Licorne

28 February 2004 26	Lorient	1–1	Sedan	Lorient
--:-- CET (UTC+1)				Stadium: Stade du Moustoir

6 March 2004 27	Valence	1–2	Lorient	Valence
--:-- CET (UTC+1)				Stadium: Stade Georges Pompidou

13 March 2004 28	Lorient	2–1	Istres	Lorient
--:-- CET (UTC+1)				Stadium: Stade du Moustoir

20 March 2004 29	Besançon	1–1	Lorient	Besançon
--:-- CET (UTC+1)				Stadium: Stade Léo Lagrange

27 March 2004 30	Lorient	2–3	Caen	Lorient
--:-- CET (UTC+1)				Stadium: Stade du Moustoir

3 April 2004 31	Rouen	0–1	Lorient	Rouen
20:00 CEST (UTC+2)			Luis Robson 51'	Stadium: Stade Robert Diochon; Attendance: 5,551; Referee: Pascal Garibian

10 April 2004 32	Lorient	1–1	Clermont	Lorient
20:00 CEST (UTC+2)	Chabert 43'		Perbet 51'	Stadium: Stade du Moustoir; Attendance: 6,820; Referee: Sandryk Biton

24 April 2004 33	Grenoble	1–1	Lorient	Grenoble
20:00 CEST (UTC+2)	François 85'		Koutouan 16'	Stadium: Stade Lesdiguières; Attendance: 5,707; Referee: Serge Fidri

1 May 2004 34	Lorient	1–0	Laval	Lorient
20:00 CEST (UTC+2)	Gauvin 9'			Stadium: Stade du Moustoir; Attendance: 7,298; Referee: Yves Brizou

10 May 2004 35	Troyes	3–3	Lorient	Troyes
20:45 CEST (UTC+2)	Saïfi 11'; Nadé 46', 68'		Gragnic 24'; Guel 53' (pen.); Luis Robson 85'	Stadium: Stade de l'Aube; Attendance: 5,734; Referee: Patrick Lhermite

13 May 2004 36	Lorient	2–0	Angers	Lorient
20:30 CEST (UTC+2)	Luis Robson 62'; Diop 80'			Stadium: Stade du Moustoir; Attendance: 6,451; Referee: Alexandre Castro

16 May 2004 37	Niort	1–2	Lorient	Niort
20:00 CEST (UTC+2)	Biakolo 74'		Pédron 26'; Bastien 89' (pen.)	Stadium: Stade René Gaillard; Attendance: 5,249; Referee: Jérome Auroux

22 May 2004 38	Lorient	0–5	Gueugnon	Lorient
20:00 CEST (UTC+2)			Boutabout 12', 60', 68'; Maspimby 45'; Aubanel 63'	Stadium: Stade du Moustoir; Attendance: 7,396; Referee: Thierry Auriac

=== Coupe de France ===
22 November 2003 Seventh round	Lorient	3–1	ES Rochelaise	Lorient
--:-- CET (UTC+1)	Bouard 10'; Koné 33'; Kroupi 59'		Ramia 65'	Stadium: Stade du Moustoir

13 December 2003 Eighth round	Stade Mayennais FC	0–3 (a.e.t.)	Lorient	Mayenne
--:-- CET (UTC+1)			Koulibaly 91'; Tony 96'; Koné 119'

3 January 2004 Round of 64	ESA Brive	1–1 (a.e.t.) (3–1 p)	Lorient	Brive-la-Gaillarde
--:-- CET (UTC+1)	Forest 52'		Norbert 84'	Stadium: Stade André Pestourie; Attendance: 2,200; Referee: Claude Medam

=== Coupe de la Ligue ===
28 October 2003 Round of 32	Sedan	2–0	Lorient	Sedan
--:-- CET (UTC+1)	Di Tommaso 43'; Noro 87'			Stadium: Stade Louis Dugauguez; Attendance: 8,500; Referee: Dominique Fraise

== Statistics ==
=== Goalscorers ===
Rank	Pos	No.	Nat	Name	Ligue 2	Coupe de France	Coupe de la Ligue	Total
1	FW	12	(Ivory Coast)	Bakari Koné	9	2	0	11
2	FW	19	(Ivory Coast)	Antonin Koutouan	8	1	0	9
3	DF	4	(France)	Antony Gauvin	8	0	0	8
4	MF	14	(Ivory Coast)	Tchiressoua Guel	7	0	0	7
4	FW	9	(Brazil)	Luis Robson	7	0	0	7
6	MF	21	(France)	David Bouard	3	1	0	4
Totals					57	7	0	64
