= Majed Aman =

Qatari footballer (born 1994)

Personal information
- Full name: Majed Aman Hareb Salmeen
- Date of birth: 6 September 1994 (age 32)
- Place of birth: Qatar
- Position: Midfielder

Youth career
- Al Arabi

Senior career*
| Years | Team | Apps | (Gls) |
| 2014–2017 | Al Arabi | 2 | (0) |
| 2016–2017 | → Al-Khor (loan) | 20 | (0) |
| 2017–2024 | Al-Kharaitiyat | 34 | (0) |
| 2020–2021 | → Qatar (loan) | 6 | (0) |
- * Club domestic league appearances and goals

Majed Aman (Arabic: ماجد أمان; born 6 September 1994) is a Qatari footballer. He currently plays as a midfielder.
