= Cho Yong-hyung =

South Korean footballer (born 1983)

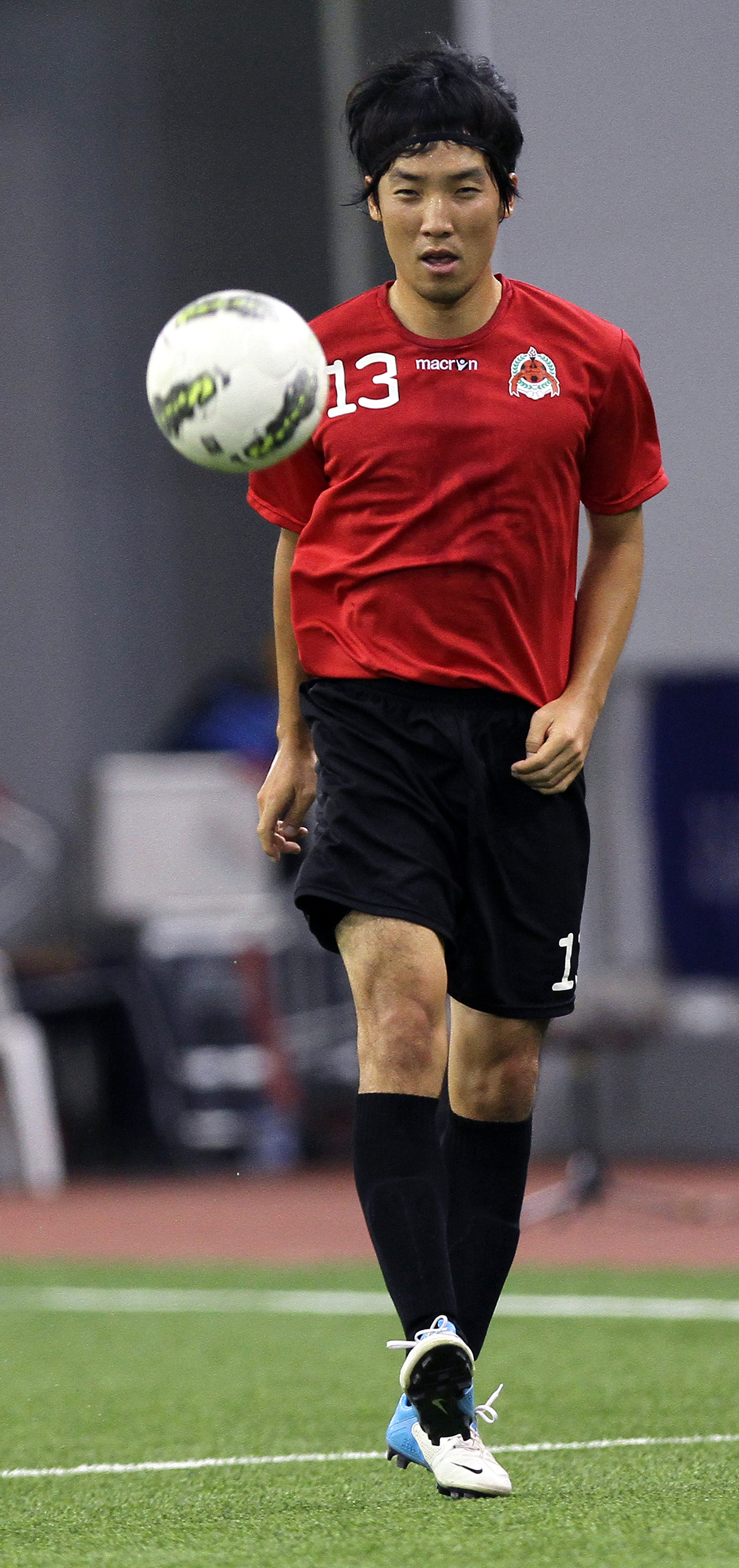
- Cho with Al-Rayyan in 2012

Personal information
- Full name: Cho Yong-hyung
- Date of birth: 3 November 1983 (age 43)
- Place of birth: Incheon, South Korea
- Height: 1.82 m (6 ft 0 in)
- Position: Centre-back

Senior career*
Years	Team	Apps	(Gls)
2005–2006	Jeju United	47	(0)
2007	Gyeongnam FC	0	(0)
2007	Seongnam Ilhwa Chunma	18	(0)
2008–2010	Jeju United	57	(1)
2010–2014	Al-Rayyan	81	(2)
2014–2015	Al-Shamal	12	(2)
2015–2016	Shijiazhuang Ever Bright	52	(2)
2017–2018	Jeju United	33	(0)
2019	Jeju United	5	(0)
Total		305	(7)

International career
2008–2012	South Korea	42	(0)
Medal record
Men's football
Representing South Korea
AFC Asian Cup
Bronze medal – third place	2011 Qatar	Team
EAFF Championship
Gold medal – first place	2008 China	Team
Silver medal – second place	2010 Japan	Team
- * Club domestic league appearances and goals

- Cho Yong-hyung
- Hangul: 조용형
- Hanja: 趙容亨
- RR: Jo Yonghyeong
- MR: Cho Yonghyŏng

Cho Yong-hyung (Korean: 조용형, born 3 November 1983) is a South Korean football coach and former player, who is the assistant coach of South Korea national football team.

== Club career ==
Cho joined K League club Bucheon SK in 2005, and was voted into the K League Best XI after his successful debut season. He continued playing for the club in the 2006 season when it changed its stronghold to Jeju Province. He was called "the next Hong Myung-bo" by showing great potential in Bucheon and Jeju.

Cho was traded to Gyeongnam FC before the 2007 season because Jeju United wanted to bring players whose hometown was located in its region. However, he was sold to Seongnam Ilhwa Chunma just after joining Gyeongnam, and played as a full-back, not a centre-back. He did not live up to expectations in Seongnam due to unfamiliar role.

Cho returned to Jeju United only a year after leaving the club. He once again had a hard time in 2009 season when he was operated on for a knee cartilage injury and showed poor performances. He also conceded eight goals in a match against Pohang Steelers in the middle of the season. However, he helped Jeju maintain its first place in the league until the first half of the next season, and then left a good impression in the 2010 FIFA World Cup.

Some Premier League clubs were interested in Cho in the summer after the World Cup, but they did not give specific offers to him. He moved to Qatar Stars League club Al-Rayyan on a 2-year deal, until the end of the 2011–12 season. There was an unusual option of joining La Liga club Málaga, owned by the owner of Al-Rayyan, at the end of the contract period in his contract with Al-Rayyan. Nevertheless, he extended his contract two years later because he did not have confidence to compete with Málaga defenders.

== International career ==
Cho made his first appearance for South Korean national team against Chile on 30 January 2008.

Cho was named the best defender of the 2010 EAFF Championship, although he had difficulty marking Chinese players in the competition.

Cho was selected for the national team for the 2010 FIFA World Cup, but he was suspected of incompetence by Korean fans. He was largely criticised by being nicknamed "Huh Yong-hyung", which meant manager Huh Jung-moo's son, before the World Cup. However, their flak was changed to praise after his outstanding defence in the World Cup.

== Style of play ==
Cho could play as a full-back or a defensive midfielder, but he showed his best performances when playing as a centre-back. He was praised in the K League for his positional sense and steadiness under pressure.

== Career statistics ==
=== Club ===
Appearances and goals by club, season and competition
Club	Season	League			National cup		League cup		Continental		Total	
Club	Season	Division	Apps	Goals	Apps	Goals	Apps	Goals	Apps	Goals	Apps	Goals
Jeju United	2005	K League	22	0	0	0	12	0	—		34	0
Jeju United	2006	K League	25	0	0	0	10	0	—		35	0
Jeju United	Total		47	0	0	0	22	0	—		69	0
Seongnam Ilhwa Chunma	2007	K League	18	0	1	0	1	0	4	0	24	0
Jeju United	2008	K League	24	0	1	0	7	0	—		32	0
Jeju United	2009	K League	19	1	2	0	4	0	—		25	1
Jeju United	2010	K League	14	0	1	0	1	0	—		16	0
Jeju United	Total		57	1	4	0	12	0	—		73	1
Al-Rayyan	2010–11	Qatar Stars League	20	0					4	0	24	0
Al-Rayyan	2011–12	Qatar Stars League	21	1					6	0	27	1
Al-Rayyan	2012–13	Qatar Stars League	20	1					4	0	24	1
Al-Rayyan	2013–14	Qatar Stars League	20	0			1	0	5	0	26	0
Al-Rayyan	Total		81	2			1	0	19	0	101	2
Al-Shamal	2014–15	Qatar Stars League	12	2					—		12	2
Shijiazhuang Ever Bright	2015	Chinese Super League	26	0					—		26	0
Shijiazhuang Ever Bright	2016	Chinese Super League	26	2					—		26	2
Shijiazhuang Ever Bright	Total		52	2					—		52	2
Jeju United	2017	K League 1	17	0	1	0	—		6	0	24	0
Jeju United	2018	K League 1	16	0	1	0	—		6	0	23	0
Jeju United	Total		33	0	2	0	—		12	0	47	0
Jeju United	2019	K League 1	5	0	0	0	—		—		5	0
Career total			305	7	7	0	36	0	35	0	383	7

== Honours ==
Al-Rayyan

- Emir of Qatar Cup: 2011, 2013
- Qatar Crown Prince Cup: 2012
- Sheikh Jassim Cup: 2012, 2013

South Korea

- AFC Asian Cup third place: 2011
- EAFF Championship: 2008

Individual

- K League All-Star: 2005, 2006
- K League 1 Best XI: 2005
- EAFF Championship Best Defender: 2010
