= Ashraf Bait Taysir =

Omani footballer (born 1982)

Ashraf Taysir
Personal information
- Full name: Ashraf Eid Taysir Bait Taysir
- Date of birth: 29 September 1982 (age 44)
- Place of birth: Oman
- Position: Defender

Senior career*
Years	Team	Apps	(Gls)
2006–2008	Al-Nasr	?	(2)
2008–2010	Al-Kharaitiyat	?	(0)
2010–2011	Dhofar	?	(0)

International career
2005–2008	Oman	5	(0)
- * Club domestic league appearances and goals

Ashraf Eid Taysir Bait Taysir (Arabic: اشرف عيد تيسير بيت تيسير; born 29 September 1982), commonly known as Ashraf Taysir, is an Omani footballer who last played for Dhofar S.C.S.C. in the Oman Elite League.

== Club career statistics ==
Club	Season	Division	League		Cup		Continental		Other		Total	
Club	Season	Division	Apps	Goals	Apps	Goals	Apps	Goals	Apps	Goals	Apps	Goals
Al-Nasr	2007–08	Omani League	-	2	-	0	0	0	-	0	-	2
Al-Nasr	Total		-	2	-	0	0	0	-	0	-	2
Career total			-	2	-	0	0	0	-	0	-	2

== International career ==
Ashraf was selected for the national team for the first time in 2005. He has made appearances in the 2010 FIFA World Cup qualification and has represented national team in the 2007 AFC Asian Cup qualification.
