= Khalid Jaberti =

Ethiopian footballer (born 1984)

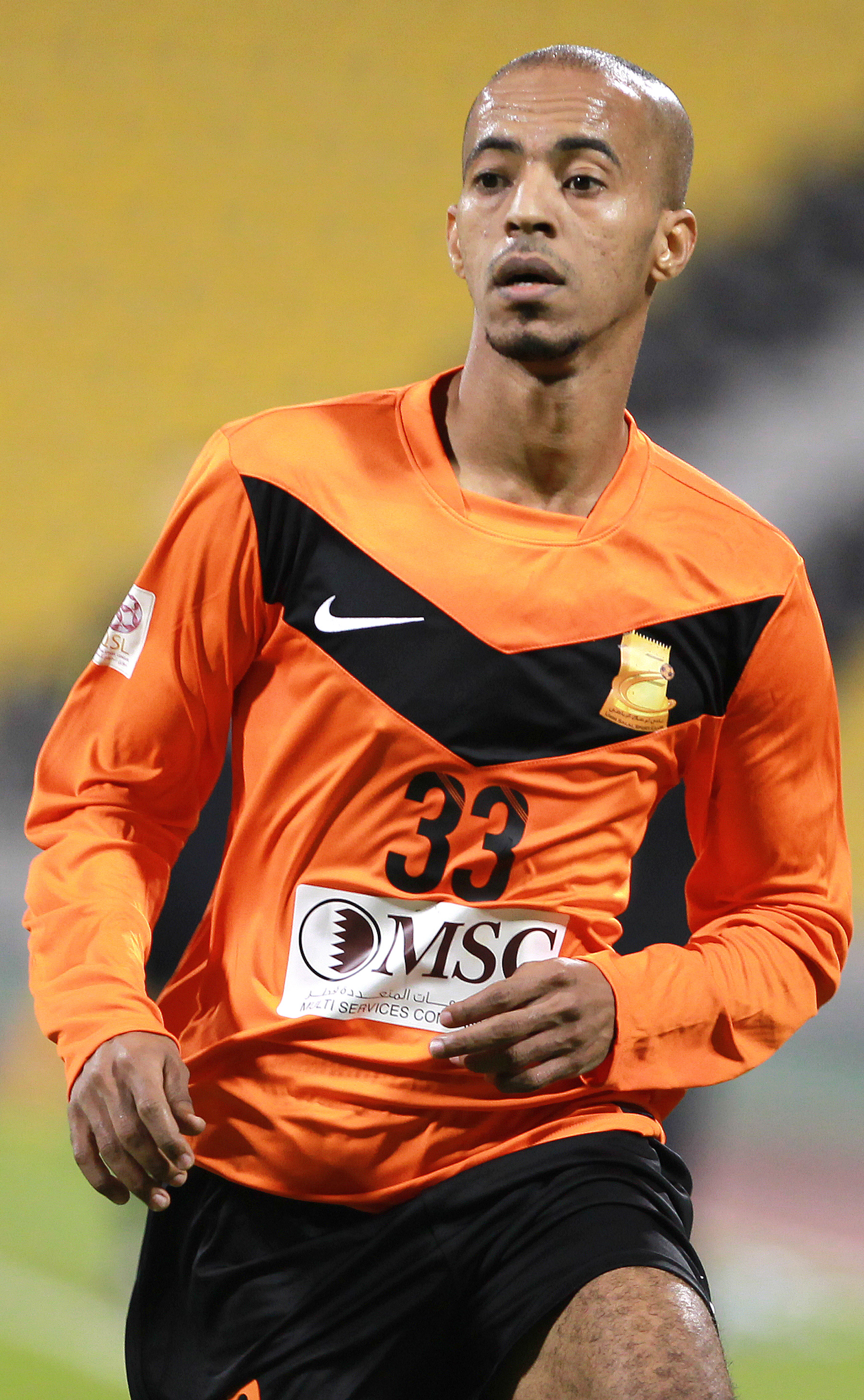

Personal information
- Full name: Khalid Nouruddin Jaberti
- Date of birth: January 1, 1984 (age 42)
- Place of birth: Ethiopia
- Position: Full-back

Senior career*
Years	Team	Apps	(Gls)
2004–2006	Al-Sailiya SC		
2006–2007	Al Rayyan SC		
2007–2008	Al-Khor SC		
2008–2010	Qatar SC		
2010–2011	Al Arabi		
2011–2014	Umm Salal	28	(0)
2014–2015	Al Kharaitiyat SC	10	(0)
2015–2020	Mesaimeer		
- * Club domestic league appearances and goals

Khalid Jaberti is an Ethiopian football player.
