= Bakari Koné =

Ivorian footballer (born 1981)

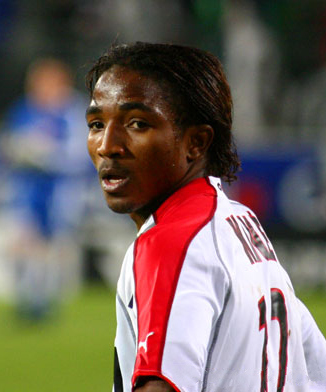
- Koné with Nice in 2005

Personal information
- Full name: Bakari Koné
- Date of birth: 17 September 1981 (age 45)
- Place of birth: Abidjan, Ivory Coast
- Height: 1.67 m (5 ft 6 in)
- Position: Winger

Youth career
- 1994–1999: ASEC Mimosas

Senior career*
Years	Team	Apps	(Gls)
1999–2002	ASEC Mimosas	84	(29)
2002–2003	Al-Ittihad	28	(11)
2003–2005	Lorient	68	(34)
2005–2008	Nice	95	(29)
2008–2010	Marseille	55	(13)
2010–2012	Lekhwiya	37	(14)
2012–2013	Qatar SC	21	(5)
2013–2014	Umm Salal	13	(3)
2014–2016	Ajman	13	(7)
2016	Paris FC	7	(0)
Total		421	(145)

International career
2003–2010	Ivory Coast	42	(9)
- * Club domestic league appearances and goals

Bakari Koné (born 17 September 1981) is an Ivorian former professional footballer who played as a winger.

== Club career ==
=== Early career ===
Koné was born in Abidjan. Like many other Ivorian stars, he began his career at the famed youth academy at ASEC Mimosas, run by Frenchman Jean-Marc Guillou in his home country. Guillou recalls: "One day, when I was passing through his district, some kids stopped me. They kept saying, 'We've got Pelé living here, you've got to take a look at him'. Then, Koné came along. He was slightly built but I never doubted for one moment that he was a real find. I took him into the academy after a trial of just ten minutes, but I did tell him that the Pelé nickname would have to go. That's when he became Baky, and I think it's better that way."

Koné stayed at the academy for five years, before joining the first team and turning professional in 1999. During his time with the ASEC's first team, he won the Ivorian League three times, and also the African Supercup before moving on.

In 2002, he joined Qatari club Al-Ittihad, staying in the Persian Gulf region for just six months, before moving to France, where he joined the then Ligue 2 outfit FC Lorient, following a successful trial. It was here that Koné rose to fame. In his first season at the club, he scored 10 respectable goals, but then bagged an impressive 24 in 35 appearances in the 2004–05 season, earning him the Player of the Year and Top Scorer titles in the Ligue 2. At the end of the season, Lorient narrowly missed out on promotion to Ligue 1, and with speculation mounting linking the Ivorian to top flight sides such as OSC Lille, RC Strasbourg and AJ Auxerre, Koné received a standing ovation in his final appearance for his club. In the summer, Koné finally made his move, relocating to the French Riviera at top flight side OGC Nice, where he signed a four-year contract.

=== Nice ===
Koné made his debut with Nice against Troyes on 30 July 2005. In his first season at the club, he made 32 appearances, scoring seven times, and eight goals in 33 appearances in his second. In his second season at the club, English side Arsenal's manager Arsène Wenger labelled him a 'phenomenon' and one of the hottest prospects in French football, leading to speculation that the forward would be playing in the English Premiership.

Koné made an impressive start to the 2007–08 season for Nice. After signing a contract extension to 2009 with the Côte d'Azur side, he went on to score four times in his first eight appearances for the club. He won the Ligue 1 player of the month award for both September and October 2007, and finished the 2007–08 Ligue 1 season as top scorer for his club, after netting 14 goals in 30 appearances for the Côte d'Azur outfit.

In June 2008, Koné began talks with French club Olympique de Marseille, with a view to move to the club. The proposed transfer was held up however, with a disagreement over the fee, a situation which caused Koné to miss pre-season training at OGC Nice, apparently as a protest. The striker spoke out to state that he had been carrying an injury.

The saga went further, with Nice's president, Maurice Cohen, stating that their south-coast rivals had till 15 July to sign the striker, otherwise the club would speak to other interested parties. One reportedly interested club was capital club Paris Saint-Germain.

The striker was quoted as saying: "I know that this is going to get sorted out but I can't tell you when. If we talk about (the) 15 July (deadline)...I'm not worried about that."

Marseille's president, Pape Diouf, echoed Koné's comments, stating: "Ultimatums not only fail to impress me, but they also never provide a solution. Now, concerning Baki, it doesn't just depend on us but on the wishes of the two clubs and, in particular, the two presidents. Personally I think that good sense can do a lot in this case. I remain calm."

On 17 July, Koné spoke to the media once again, regarding his drawn-out transfer saga. He stated: "It's heading down a good road, I hope that it is all going to be done quickly. The important thing is that the two clubs reach an understanding."

=== Marseille ===
In July 2008, Olympique de Marseille announced the signing of Koné.

In March 2009, Koné was named Ivorian Player of the Year, ahead of FC Barcelona midfielder Yaya Touré.

=== Lekhwiya ===
On 26 May 2010, Koné signed for Qatar League side Lekhwiya along with his Ivorian teammate Aruna Dindane.

In the 2010–11 Qatar Stars League season, Koné led Lekhwiya to their first ever league championship. He was also named the best player of the season by QFA.

=== Qatar SC ===
On 18 May 2012, Koné signed a one-year contract with Qatar SC.

=== Ajman ===
Koné signed for Ajman Club of UAE at the start of the 2013–14 season, signing a two-year contract worth $2 million net per season.

== International career ==
Koné made his international debut for the Ivory Coast national team against Sudan on 5 September 2004.

He was part of the Ivorian team for the 2006 Africa Cup of Nations in Egypt. He scored a vital equaliser against Cameroon in the quarter-final. His team won the penalty shootout 12–11. However, in the final, he was one of two Ivorian players to have his penalty saved as the Ivorians lost to hosts Egypt.

The forward was selected as part of the Ivorian side for the 2006 World Cup in Germany. He was given the number 14 shirt, and played his first match for Ivory Coast against the Netherlands on 16 June 2006. He scored his first World Cup goal in that match, where the Ivory Coast lost 2–1.

Koné was also selected as part of the Ivorian squad for the 2008 Africa Cup of Nations in Ghana. He made four substitute appearances for the Elephants, and scored once against West African rivals Guinea in the quarter final stage, where the Ivorians ran out 5–1 winners.

He was also selected in the preliminary Ivory Coast squad for the 2010 FIFA World Cup, but was eventually dropped along with Gilles Yapi Yapo and Emerse Faé, who played with him in the 2006 World Cup.

== Personal life ==
Koné holds both Ivorian and French nationalities. He is the older brother of fellow Ivorian international Arouna Koné, who is a striker.

== Career statistics ==
=== Club ===
Appearances and goals by club, season and competition
Club	Season	League			National cup		League cup		Continental		Total	
Club	Season	Division	Apps	Goals	Apps	Goals	Apps	Goals	Apps	Goals	Apps	Goals
Al-Ittihad	2002–03	Qatar Stars League	28	11							28	11
Lorient	2003–04	Ligue 2	33	10	3	2	1	0	–		37	12
Lorient	2004–05	Ligue 2	35	24					–		35	24
Lorient	Total		68	34	3	2	1	0	–		2	36
Nice	2005–06	Ligue 1	32	7	0	0	1	0	–		33	7
Nice	2006–07	Ligue 1	33	8	2	0	1	0	–		36	8
Nice	2007–08	Ligue 1	30	14	1	0	1	0	–		32	14
Nice	Total		95	29	3	0	3	0	–		101	29
Marseille	2008–09	Ligue 1	28	9	2	0	0	0	14	1	44	10
Marseille	2009–10	Ligue 1	27	4	1	0	1	0	7	2	36	6
Marseille	Total		55	13	3	0	1	0	21	3	80	16
Lekhwiya	2010–11	Qatar Stars League	21	11					–		21	11
Lekhwiya	2011–12	Qatar Stars League	16	3					6	1	22	4
Lekhwiya	Total		37	14					6	1	43	15
Qatar SC	2012–13	Qatar Stars League	21	5					–		21	5
UMM Salal	2013–14	Qatar Stars League	13	3	2	3			–		15	6
Ajman	2013–14	UAE Pro-League	9	5			4	0	–		13	5
Ajman	2014–15	UAE Pro-League	9	3					–		9	3
Ajman	Total		18	8			4	0	–		22	8
Paris FC	2015–16	Ligue 2	7	0	0	0	0	0	–		7	0
Career total			342	117	11	5	9	0	27	4	389	126

=== International ===
Scores and results list Ivory Coast's goal tally first, score column indicates score after each Koné goal.

List of international goals scored by Bakari Koné
No.	Date	Venue	Opponent	Score	Result	Competition
1	4 February 2006	Cairo Military Academy Stadium, Cairo, Egypt	Cameroon		1–1 (12–11 pen.)	2006 Africa Cup of Nations
2	16 June 2006	Stuttgart, Germany	Netherlands		1–2	2006 FIFA World Cup
3	3 February 2008	Sekondi-Takoradi Stadium, Sekondi, Ghana	Guinea		5–0	2008 Africa Cup of Nations
4	20 August 2008	Chantilly, France	Guinea		2–1	Friendly
5	7 September 2008	Estádio da Machava, Maputo, Mozambique	Mozambique		1–1	2010 FIFA World Cup Qualification
6	29 March 2009	Stade Félix Houphouët-Boigny, Abidjan, Ivory Coast	Malawi		5–0	2010 FIFA World Cup Qualification
7	7 June 2009	Stade du 28 Septembre, Conakry, Guinea	Guinea		2–1	2010 FIFA World Cup Qualification

== Honours ==
ASEC Mimosas

- Côte d'Ivoire Premier Division: 2000, 2001, 2002
- CAF Super Cup: 1999

Nice

- Coupe de la Ligue runner-up: 2005–06

Marseille

- Ligue 1: 2009–10
- Coupe de la Ligue: 2009–10

Lekhwiya

- Qatar Stars League: 2010–11

Ivory Coast

- Africa Cup of Nations runner-up: 2006

Individual

- Ligue 2 Player of the Year: 2004–05
- Ligue 2 Team of the Year: 2004–05
- Ligue 2 Top Scorer: 2004–05
- Ligue 1 Player of the Month: September 2007, October 2007
- Ivorian Player of the Year: 2008
- Qatar Stars League Player of the Season: 2010–11
