= Saeed El-Hadj =

Qatari footballer (born 1992)

Personal information
- Full name: Saeed El-Hadj Ismael
- Date of birth: 2 February 1992 (age 34)
- Place of birth: Qatar
- Height: 1.78 m (5 ft 10 in)
- Position: Defender

Team information
- Current team: Al-Kharaitiyat
- Number: 6

Senior career*
Years	Team	Apps	(Gls)
2010–2022	Al-Gharafa	77	(1)
2012–2013	→ Umm Salal (loan)	8	(0)
2015	→ Al-Kharaitiyat (loan)	4	(0)
2016–2017	→ Muaither (loan)	25	(0)
2022–2023	Al-Sailiya	9	(0)
2023–	Al-Kharaitiyat	3	(0)
- * Club domestic league appearances and goals

Saeed El-Hadj (Arabic:سعيد الحاج) (born 2 February 1992) is a Qatari footballer. He currently plays for Al-Kharaitiyat.

== Club career ==
El-Hadj began his professional career with Al-Gharafa in 2010. Between 2012 and 2017, he was loaned to Umm Salal, Al-Kharaitiyat and Muaither. In July 2022 he joined Al-Sailiya.

== Honours ==
=== Club ===
Al-Gharafa

- Qatar Cup: 2010
- Emir of Qatar Cup: 2012
- Qatari Stars Cup: 2017-18, 2018-19
