= Ahmed Mohamed Musa =

Qatari footballer

Ahmad Musa is a Qatari football midfielder who played for Qatar in the 2004 AFC Asian Cup.
