= Gérard Gili =

French footballer and manager (born 1952)

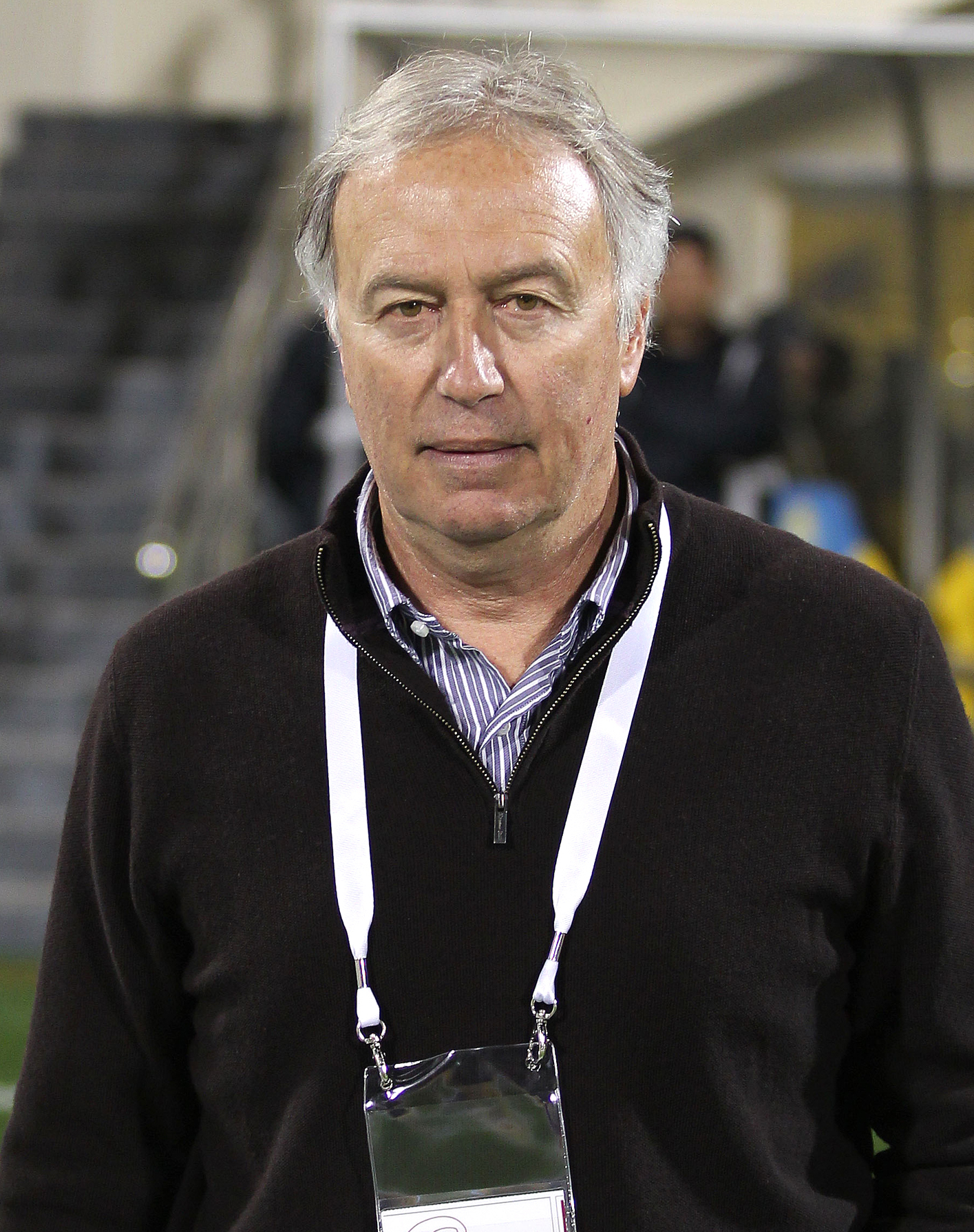
- Gili as Umm Salal manager

Personal information
- Date of birth: 7 August 1952 (age 74)
- Place of birth: Marseille, France
- Height: 1.80 m (5 ft 11 in)
- Position: Goalkeeper

Youth career
- 1967–1971: CA Gombertois

Senior career*
Years	Team	Apps	(Gls)
1971–1973	Marseille		
1973–1976	Bastia		
1976–1978	Rouen		
1978–1979	Olympique Alès		
1979–1980	Rouen		
1980–1981	Bastia		
1981–1983	Marseille		

Managerial career
- 1988–1990: Marseille
- 1990–1991: Bordeaux
- 1992–1994: Montpellier
- 1994: Marseille
- 1995–1997: Marseille
- 1999–2000: Egypt
- 2002–2004: Bastia
- 2004–2006: Ivory Coast (assistant coach)
- 2006–2008: Ivory Coast (youth team)
- 2008: Ivory Coast
- 2008–2010: Umm Salal
- 2011–2012: Umm Salal
- 2013: Umm Salal
- * Club domestic league appearances and goals

Gérard Gili (born 7 August 1952) is a French football manager and former player.

Gili's highest profile appointment was as manager of Ivory Coast. He was named as the Ivorians' head coach in January 2008, following the resignation of Uli Stielike for personal reasons on the eve of the 2008 Africa Cup of Nations. Gili was promoted from within, having been a former coach of the country's Under-23 side with whom he qualified for the 2008 Olympics in Beijing.

After leaving the Ivory Coast job, Gili was named manager of the Qatari club side Umm Salal, but he was sacked in 2010, leaving him unemployed for a year. However, he was reinstated on 15 December 2011 after Umm Salal sacked Moroccan coach Hassan Harmatallah "for unhealthy working environment". The team was at the bottom of the table with no wins so far in mid-season. After the 2011–12 season, Gili was replaced by another French coach Bertrand Marchand.

During his playing career, he was most notably goalkeeper for Olympique de Marseille.

== Career statistics ==
=== Head coach ===
As of 31 May 2013

Nation	Team	From	To	Record				
Nation	Team	From	To	P	W	D	L	Win %
(France)	Marseille	1988	1990	85	48	24	13	56.47
(France)	Bordeaux	1990	1991	44	14	16	14	31.82
(France)	Montpellier	1992	1994	77	27	25	25	35.06
(France)	Marseille	1995	1997	80	35	24	21	43.75
(Egypt)	Egypt	1999	2000	9	5	1	3	55.56
(France)	Bastia	2002	2004	76	21	23	32	27.63
(Ivory Coast)	Ivory Coast	2008	2008	8	5	1	2	62.50
Total				379	155	114	110	40.9

== Honours ==
=== As a manager ===
Marseille

- Ligue 1: 1988–89, 1989–90
- Coupe de France: 1988–89

Montpellier

- Coupe de la Ligue: 1991–92
