= Jean-Cédric Maspimby =

French footballer (born 1977)

Jean-Cédric Maspimby (born 3 October 1977) is a French former professional footballer who played for French Ligue 2 clubs Gueugnon, Brest, Reims and Boulogne. He made one appearance for the Martinique national team.
