= Abdullah Mostafa =

Qatari footballer (born 1988)

Abdullah Mustafa
Personal information
- Full name: Abdullah Mustafa
- Date of birth: 6 March 1988 (age 38)
- Place of birth: Qatar
- Height: 1.75 m (5 ft 9 in)
- Position: Midfielder

Senior career*
Years	Team	Apps	(Gls)
2007–2012	Al Ahli		
2012–2013	El Jaish		
2013–2017	Al-Khor		
- * Club domestic league appearances and goals

Abdullah Mustafa (Arabic: عبدالله مصطفى) (born 6 March 1988) is a Qatari footballer who last played for Al-Khor.
