= Mostafa Mido =

Qatari footballer (born 1981)

Mostafa Mohyi
Personal information
- Full name: Medhat Mostafa Mohyi Al Dein
- Date of birth: January 18, 1981 (age 45)
- Place of birth: Qatar
- Position: Defender

Senior career*
Years	Team	Apps	(Gls)
2002–2004	Al-Gharafa		
2004–2016	Qatar SC		
2012–2013	→ Umm Salal (loan)	15	(0)
2016–2017	Umm Salal		
2017–2019	Al-Markhiya		
- * Club domestic league appearances and goals as of 31 July 2013

Mostafa Mido (Arabic:مصطفى ميدو; born 18 January 1981) is a Qatari football player.
