= Mujtaba Sayed Jaafar =

Qatari footballer (born 1981)

Mujtaba Jaafar
Personal information
- Full name: Mujtaba Sayed Jaafar
- Date of birth: 12 August 1981 (age 45)
- Place of birth: Doha, Qatar
- Height: 1.82 m (6 ft 0 in)
- Position: Midfielder

Senior career*
Years	Team	Apps	(Gls)
1999–2000	Al Arabi	1	(0)
2001–2003	Al Markhiya	22	(0)
2003–2011	Al Arabi	90	(7)
2011	Al Wakrah	9	(1)
2011–2012	El Jaish	3	(0)
2012–2014	Umm Salal	3	(0)
2014–2015	Al Ahli	2	(0)

International career
2005–2008	Qatar	5	(0)
- * Club domestic league appearances and goals

Mujtaba Jaafar (born 12 August 1981) is a Qatari footballer who currently plays for Umm Salal as a midfielder.

== Career ==
In June 2011, Jaafar transferred to the newly promoted club El Jaish. In January 2012, he joined Umm Salal. However, shortly after the transfer materialized, he suffered an injury in his first match which made him miss the rest of the season.
