= Alain Perrin =

French football manager (born 1956)

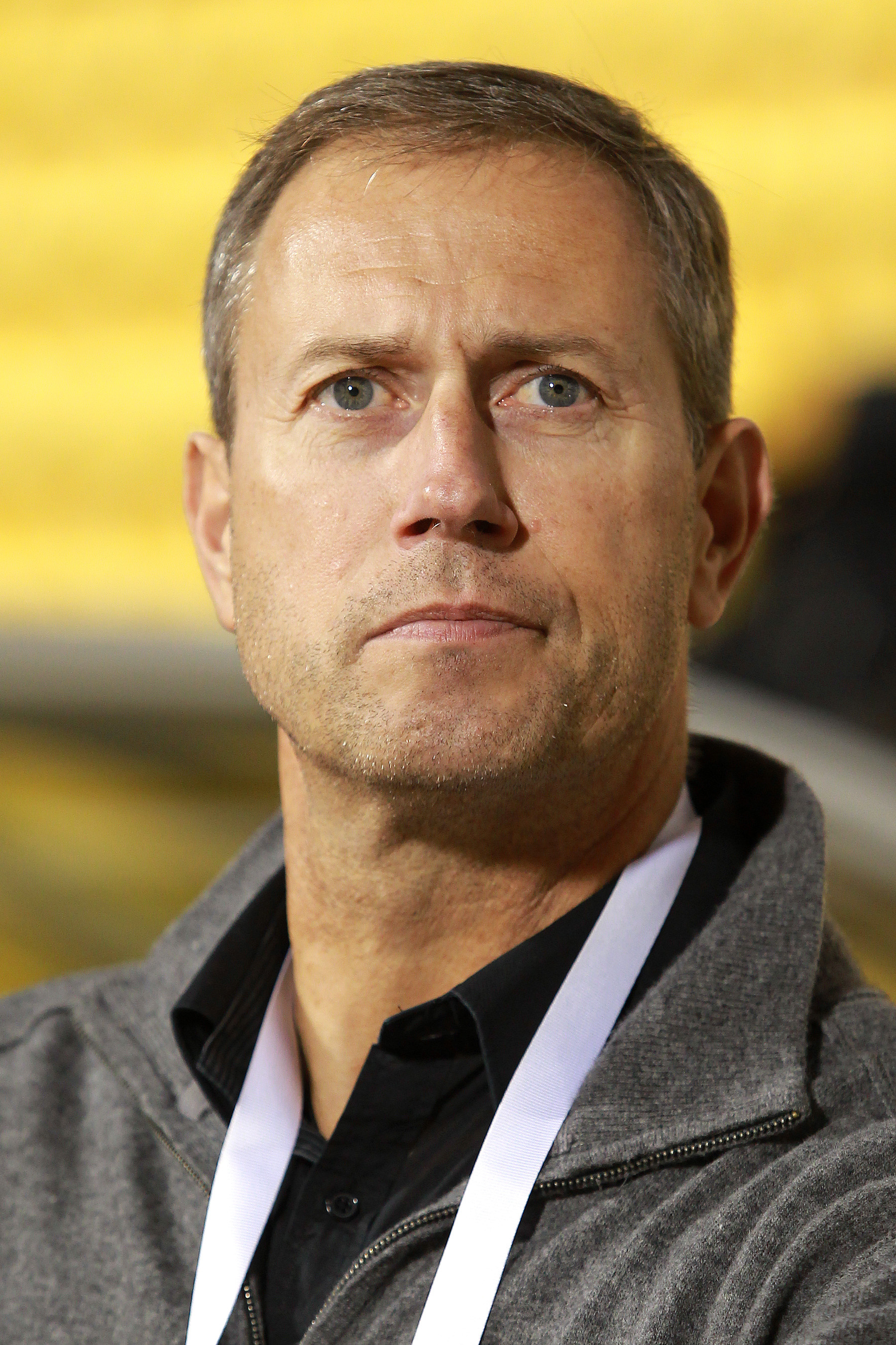
- Perrin as manager of Al-Khor in 2011

Personal information
- Full name: Alain André Christian Perrin
- Date of birth: 7 October 1956 (age 70)
- Place of birth: Lure, Haute-Saône, France
- Position: Defender

Youth career
- 1966–1970: Haguenau
- 1970–1971: Tomblaine
- 1971: Nancy

Senior career*
Years	Team	Apps	(Gls)
1971–1975	Nancy		
1976–1981	Varangéville		
1983–1987	Nancy		

Managerial career
- 1993–2002: Troyes
- 2002–2004: Marseille
- 2004: Al-Ain
- 2005: Portsmouth
- 2006–2007: Sochaux
- 2007–2008: Lyon
- 2008–2009: Saint-Étienne
- 2010–2012: Al-Khor
- 2012–2013: Qatar (Olympic)
- 2012–2013: Al Gharafa
- 2013: Umm Salal
- 2014–2016: China
- 2018–2019: Nancy
- * Club domestic league appearances and goals

Alain André Christian Perrin (French pronunciation: [alɛ̃ ɑ̃dʁe kʁistjɑ̃ pɛʁɛ̃]; born 7 October 1956) is a French professional football manager and former player.

Perrin made his managerial breakthrough at Troyes, whom he took from the fourth tier to Ligue 1 and UEFA Cup qualification by winning the 2001 UEFA Intertoto Cup. He won the Coupe de France with Sochaux in 2007, and the league and cup double for Lyon a year later.

Abroad, Perrin worked for several years in Qatar and had brief spells in the United Arab Emirates and with Portsmouth in the Premier League. Internationally, he led China at the 2015 AFC Asian Cup.

== Early life ==
Alain André Christian Perrin was born on 7 October 1956 in Lure, Haute-Saône.

== Managerial career ==
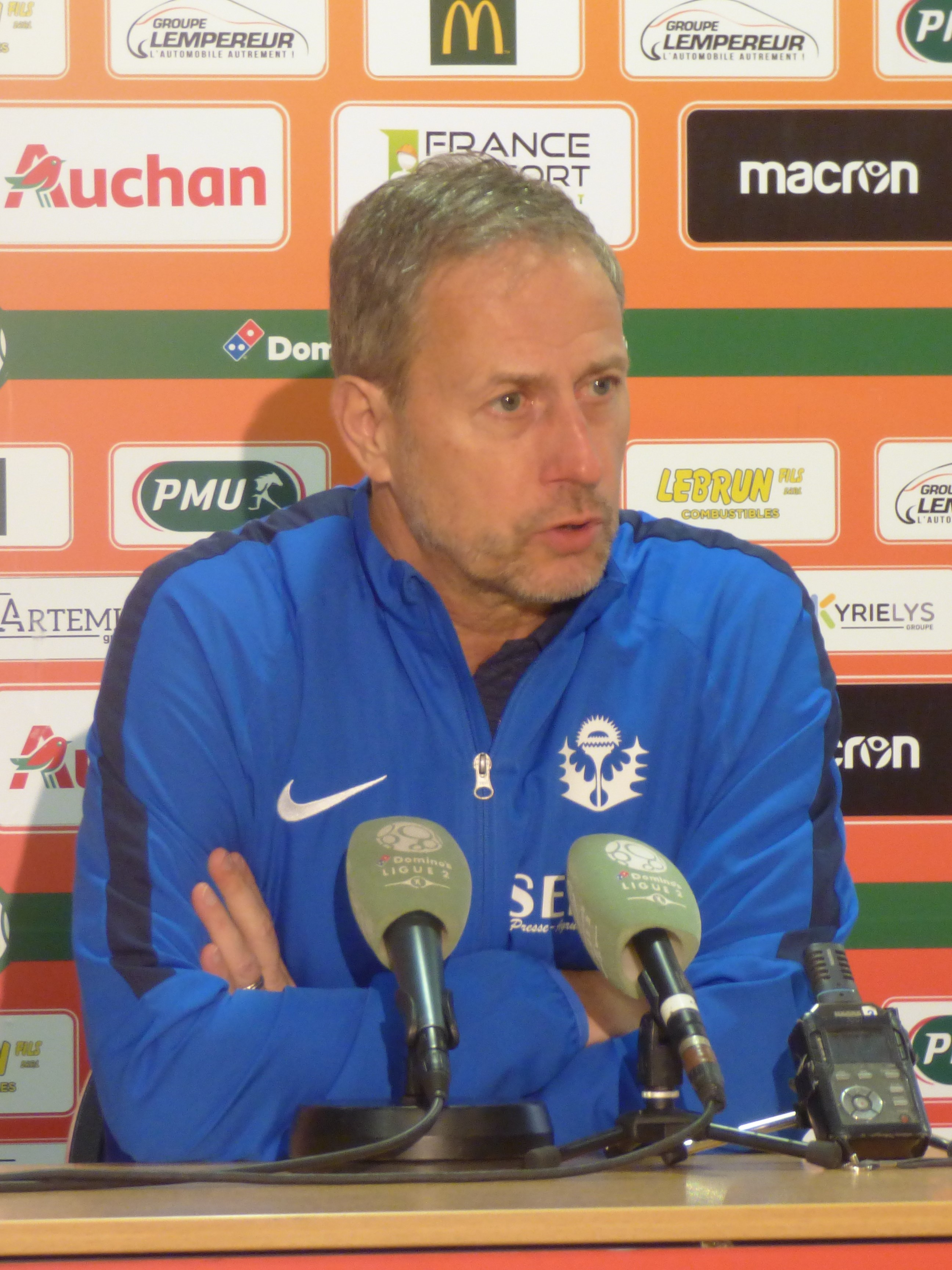
Perrin as manager of Nancy in 2019

=== Troyes ===
Perrin began his coaching career at Nancy in 1983, as junior coach to Arsène Wenger. He built up a reputation as a talented young coach whilst at the club, and was appointed to run the club's academy.

In 1993, Perrin had his first chance at management, taking over as manager of French National 2 (fourth division) club Troyes, quickly taking the club to Ligue 1 after three promotions in six seasons, and qualifying for the UEFA Cup. His side won the 2001 UEFA Intertoto Cup on the away goals rule after a 4–4 draw at Newcastle United.

=== Marseille ===
In May 2002, Perrin signed a three-year deal to succeed Bernard Tapie as manager of Marseille. He was dismissed in January 2004 with the team in sixth, having lost 9 of their last 15 games.

Days after leaving the Stade Vélodrome, Perrin was linked to a number of managerial positions around Europe, including at Premier League club Southampton. However, in July 2004, he was named manager of Al-Ain in the UAE Pro League, and remained there for three months.

=== Portsmouth ===
On 7 April 2005, Perrin did move to the Premier League when he took over at Portsmouth; the club were in 16th place and four points above relegation with seven games to go. On 24 April, his side beat rivals Southampton 4–1 in the South Coast derby, a result that contributed to Pompey staying up and Saints being relegated.

On 24 November 2005, Perrin was sacked by Portsmouth, having won only twice all season.

=== Return to France ===
Perrin returned to Ligue 1 in May 2006, taking over a Sochaux side that had just finished 15th under Dominique Bijotat. On 12 May 2007, he won the Coupe de France against former team Marseille, on penalties after a 2–2 draw; it was the team's first win in the tournament since 1937.

Perrin took over as manager of Lyon on 30 May 2007, after Gérard Houllier resigned earlier that month. In his only season, he led the club to a seventh consecutive Ligue 1 championship title, and retained the cup for the team's first double. He stepped down in June 2008 due to differences with the club's backroom staff.

He was rumoured to take over the position of French national manager, but it was confirmed on 3 July 2008 that Raymond Domenech would remain in the position. On 11 November 2008, he became the new manager of Saint-Étienne, and was fired on 15 December 2009.

=== Qatar ===
On 1 June 2012, Perrin decided to leave Al-Khor to take up the vacant Qatar U23 position. His first assignment was to lead the team at the AFC Under-22 qualifiers, however the team were unable to make the tournament after they were knocked out in the group stages of the qualification process. Despite this disappointment, Perrin continued to lead them into the 2012 GCC U-23 Championship, where the team fared considerably better reaching the semi-finals of the tournament, and eventually coming fourth overall in the competition.

On 20 December 2012, Perrin joined Al Gharafa, and left just two months after. In March 2013, he was appointed new head coach of Umm Salal to replace Bertrand Marchand. He resigned from his post on 30 September 2013 after losing twice in the first three games of the season.

=== China ===
On 28 February 2014, Perrin was named as the new manager of the China national football team, replacing Antonio Camacho. He made his debut five days later in a 3–1 loss to Iraq in the last game of 2015 AFC Asian Cup qualification, but still made it through as the best third-placed team. At the finals in Australia, the team won all three group games before a 2–0 last 16 loss to the hosts.

In August, China finished second to South Korea on home soil at the 2015 EAFF East Asian Cup. The following 8 January, he left his job as the team sat in third in 2018 FIFA World Cup qualification following a loss at Qatar and two draws with Hong Kong.

=== Nancy ===
In April 2018, Perrin was one of 77 applicants for the vacant Cameroon national team job. On 27 October that year, he replaced Didier Tholot as manager of Ligue 2 club Nancy. On 28 May 2019, it was confirmed that Jean-Louis Garcia would be the new manager of the club for the upcoming season.

== Managerial statistics ==
As of 5 June 2021

Team	Nat	From	To	Record				
Team	Nat	From	To	G	W	D	L	Win %
Troyes	(France)	1 July 1993	30 June 2002	324	133	105	86	41.05
Marseille	(France)	1 July 2002	14 January 2004	60	31	9	20	51.67
Al-Ain	(United Arab Emirates)	13 July 2004	24 October 2004	4	2	0	2	50
Portsmouth	(England)	7 April 2005	24 November 2005	21	4	6	11	19.05
Sochaux	(France)	1 August 2006	30 June 2007	47	22	13	12	46.81
Lyon	(France)	1 July 2007	16 June 2008	59	39	11	9	66.10
Saint-Étienne	(France)	12 November 2008	15 December 2009	58	20	13	25	34.48
Al-Khor	(Qatar)	14 June 2010	31 May 2012	65	24	13	28	36.92
Qatar U23	—	1 June 2012	19 December 2012	9	3	3	3	33.33
Al Gharafa	(Qatar)	20 December 2012	21 February 2013	7	3	3	1	42.86
Umm Salal	(Qatar)	13 March 2013	30 September 2013	11	4	2	5	36.36
China	—	28 February 2014	8 January 2016	28	15	9	4	53.57
Nancy	(France)	27 October 2018	30 June 2019	30	14	4	12	46.67
Total				707	300	188	219	42.43

== Honours ==
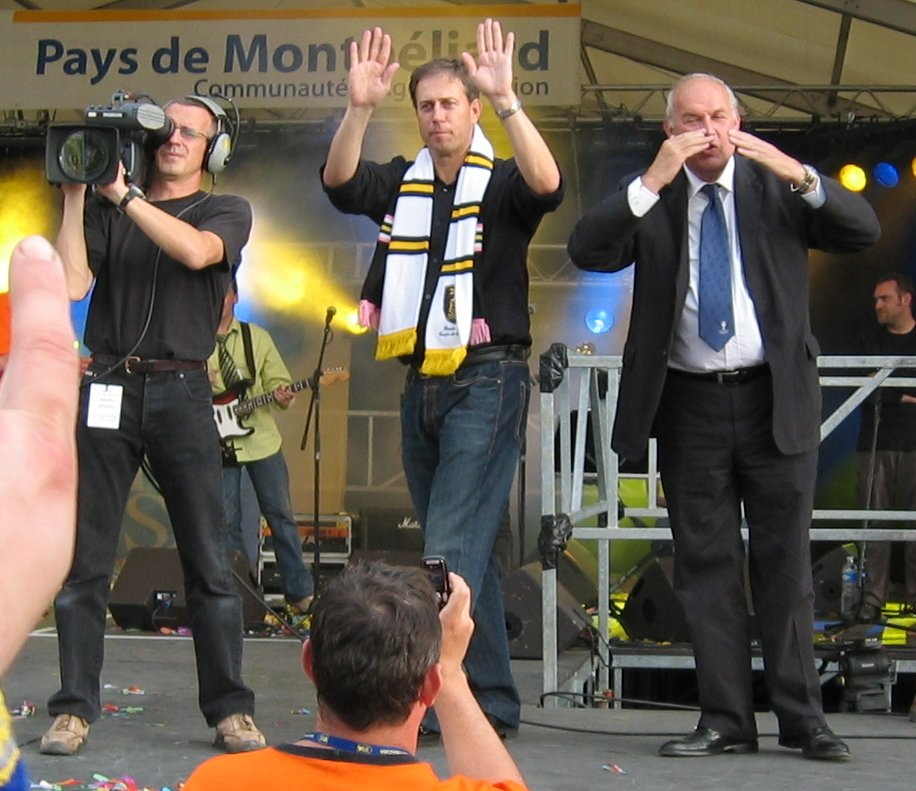
Perrin (centre) celebrating Sochaux's win in the 2007 Coupe de France Final

Troyes

- UEFA Intertoto Cup: 2001

Sochaux

- Coupe de France: 2006–07

Lyon

- Ligue 1: 2007–08
- Coupe de France: 2007–08
- Trophée des Champions: 2007
