= Adriano (footballer, born January 1982) =

Brazilian footballer

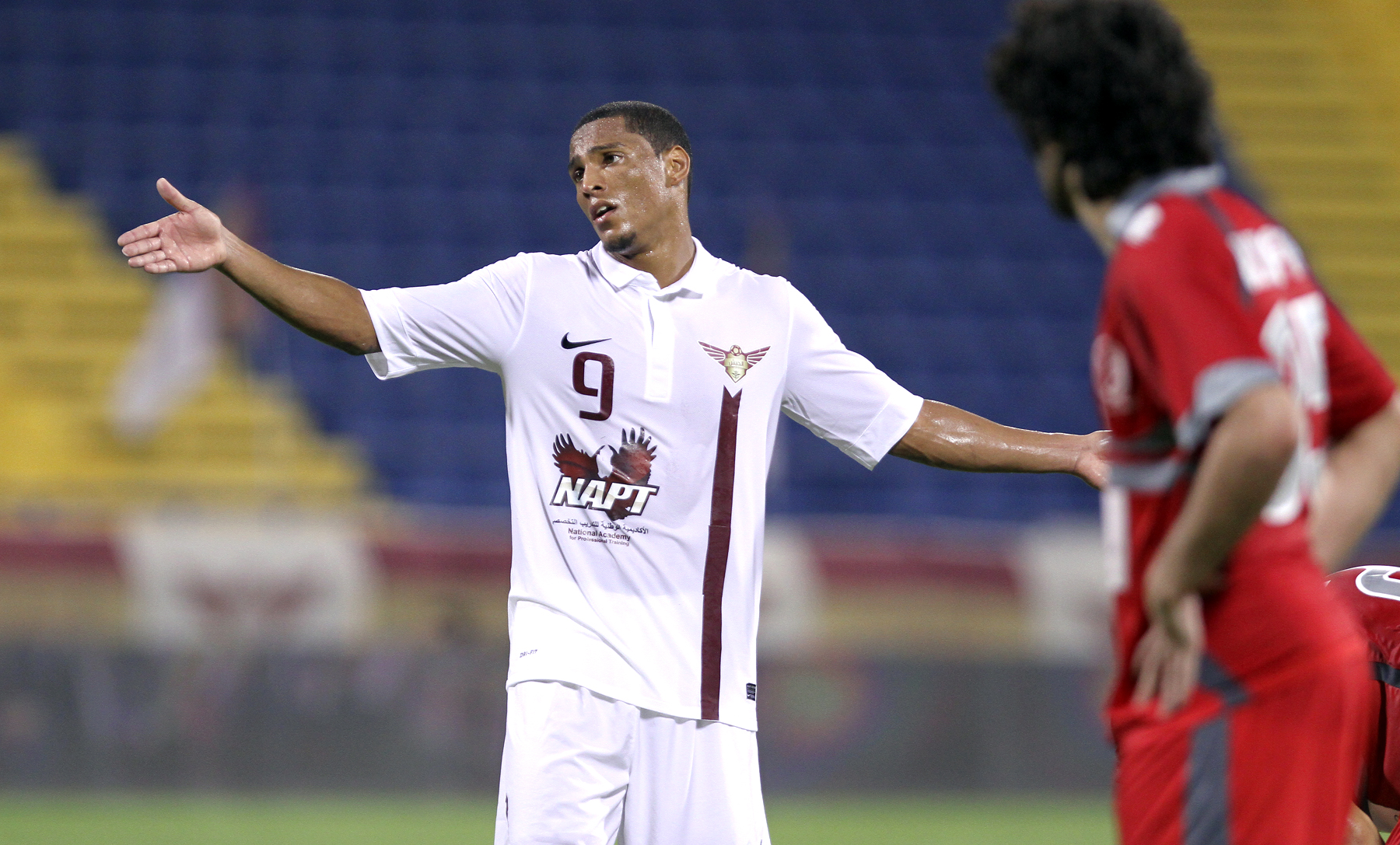

Personal information
- Full name: Adriano Ferreira Martins
- Date of birth: 21 January 1982 (age 44)
- Place of birth: São Paulo, Brazil
- Height: 1.78 m (5 ft 10 in)
- Position: Striker

Youth career
- 1997–2001: Santa Cruz
- 2002: Osasco-SP

Senior career*
Years	Team	Apps	(Gls)
2002	Itararé-SP		
2002	ECO-SP		
2003–2007	ADAP		
2003	→ Treze (loan)		
2004	→ Botafogo-PB (loan)		
2005	→ Arapongas (loan)		
2007–2010	Internacional	49	(8)
2008	→ Málaga (loan)	8	(0)
2009	→ Vasco da Gama (loan)	24	(5)
2010	→ Cerezo Osaka (loan)	27	(14)
2011	Gamba Osaka	8	(9)
2011–2013	El Jaish	41	(26)
2013–2014	Qatar SC	25	(13)
2014	Tokushima Vortis	10	(0)
2015	Ventforet Kofu	12	(1)
2015	Fortaleza	4	(0)
2016–2018	Nova Iguaçu	0	(0)
2017	→ Volta Redonda (loan)	12	(1)
2018	Barra da Tijuca	0	(0)
2020	Portuguesa-RJ	26	(14)
- * Club domestic league appearances and goals

Adriano Ferreira Martins (born 21 January 1982), or simply Adriano, is a Brazilian former professional footballer who played as a striker.

== Career ==
Born in São Paulo (SP), Adriano started his career at Itararé-SP in 2002, after having played for the youth team's of Santa Cruz and Osasco-SP. In the following year he was signed by ADAP, and was later loaned out to Treze (2003), Botafogo-PB (2004) and Arapongas (2005, where he began to gain prominence to be one of the top scorers of the Segunda Divisão Paranaense with 11 goals.

In June 2011, Adriano left Gamba Osaka and joined Qatari club El Jaish, signing a three-year contract with the club. In his first season with El Jaish, Adriano finished as the top scorer in the Qatar Stars League with 18 goals in 20 games.

Adriano expressed interest in playing for the Qatar national team, however he would have to wait until 2014 to be naturalized.

In June 2018, Adriano joined Barra da Tijuca. However, a serious injury prevented him from playing any games for the club. He was then without club until December 2019, where he joined Portuguesa da Ilha.

== Career statistics ==
As of 25 April 2014

== Honours ==
Individual

- Qatar Stars League top scorer: 2011–12 with 18 goals
