= Ali Hasan Kamal =

Iraqi footballer

Personal information
- Full name: Ali Hasan Kamal
- Date of birth: March 7, 1986 (age 40)
- Place of birth: Iraq
- Positions: Defensive midfielder; center-back

Team information
- Current team: Al-Shorta SC
- Number: 5

Senior career*
Years	Team	Apps	(Gls)
2005–2008	Al-Shuala		
2008–2009	Al Kharaitiyat SC		
2009–2012	Qatar SC		
2012–2014	Al-Khor Sports Club		
2014–2016	Zakho FC		

International career^{‡}
2012–	Iraq	0	(0)
- * Club domestic league appearances and goals ‡ National team caps and goals as of November 9, 2012

Ali Hasan Kamal (Arabic: علي حسن كمال) (born March 7, 1986) is an Iraqi midfielder.

News were circulated in November 2012 that Zico called him to the formation against Jordan.
