= Saïd Boutahar =

Dutch footballer (born 1982)

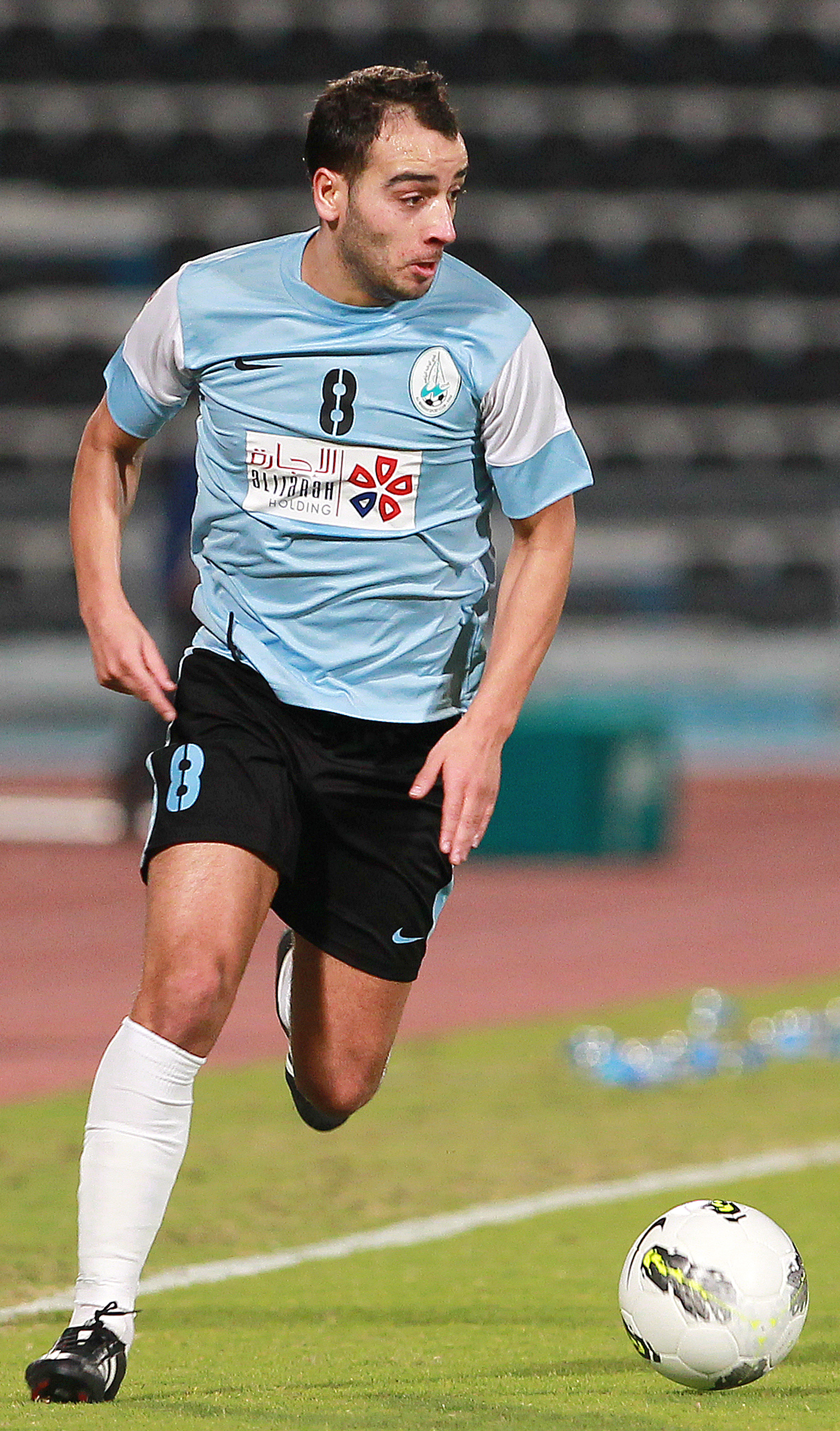
- Boutahar in 2011

Personal information
- Date of birth: 12 August 1982 (age 44)
- Place of birth: Rotterdam, Netherlands
- Height: 1.72 m (5 ft 8 in)
- Position: Midfielder

Youth career
- SDV Rotterdam
- Excelsior
- Feyenoord

Senior career*
Years	Team	Apps	(Gls)
2001–2002	Feyenoord	2	(0)
2002–2003	Excelsior	30	(9)
2003–2004	RKC	33	(8)
2004–2007	NEC	73	(12)
2007–2010	Willem II	104	(16)
2010–2011	Real Zaragoza	20	(2)
2011–2012	Al-Wakrah	18	(9)
2012–2013	Umm-Salal	17	(4)
2013–2014	Al-Wakrah	13	(3)
2014–2016	Al-Shamal	24	(5)
Total		334	(68)

International career
1998	Netherlands U17	6	(0)
2000	Netherlands U18	2	(0)
2002-2003	Netherlands U21	4	(0)
- * Club domestic league appearances and goals

Saïd Boutahar (born 12 August 1982) is a Dutch former professional footballer who played as a midfielder. He made two appearances for the Netherlands national under-18 football team and four for the U21s.

== Club career ==
Born in Rotterdam, Boutahar played alongside the likes of Robin van Persie and Mounir El Hamdaoui in the streets of the Kralingen neighborhood. He made his debut in professional football, being part of the Feyenoord squad in the 2001–02 season. He also played for Excelsior Rotterdam, RKC Waalwijk, N.E.C. and Willem II.

He moved abroad to play for Spanish side Real Zaragoza in 2010 after he decided not to renew his contract with Willem II. In 2014, he appeared to be one of 41 suspects to be involved in a 2011 match-fixing scandal around Zaragoza's win over Levante on the final day of the 2010–11 season which kept Zaragoza up.

In 2011, he moved on to play in the Gulf and joined Al-Wakrah in Qatar. He later played for Umm-Salal and Al-Shamal.
