= Bernard Simondi =

French former footballer and coach (born 1953)

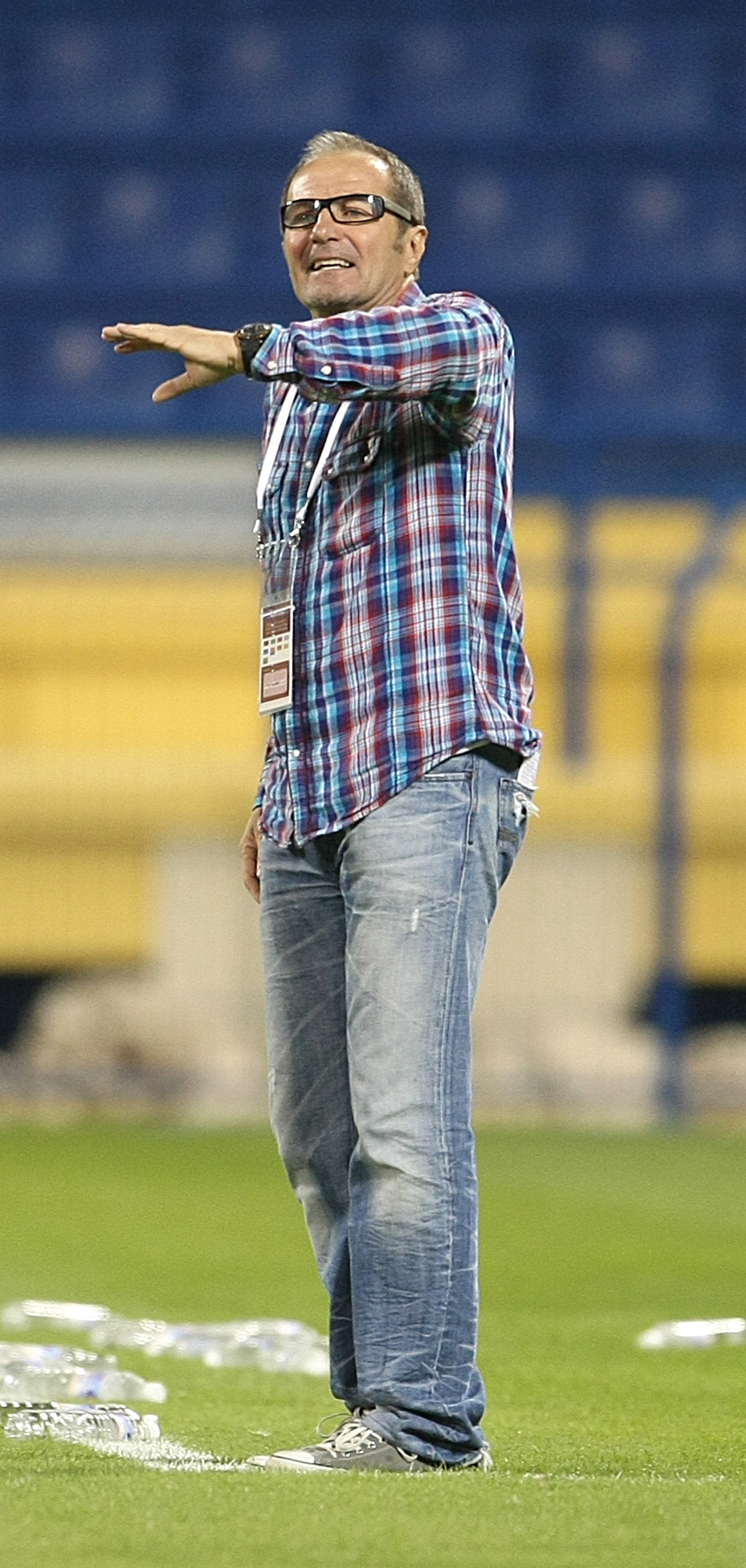

Personal information
- Date of birth: 28 July 1953 (age 73)
- Place of birth: Toulon, France
- Position: Defender

Senior career*
Years	Team	Apps	(Gls)
1970–1977	SC Toulon		
1977–1981	Stade Lavallois		
1981–1983	FC Tours		
1983–1985	AS Saint-Étienne		

Managerial career
- 1986: Al-Nasr
- 1987–1989: Puget
- 1989–1990: Aubagne
- 1991–1993: Grenoble
- 1996–1997: Grenoble
- 1998–1999: US Créteil
- 2000: Guinea
- 2001–2004: Benin (technical director)
- 2004: ES Sahel
- 2005–2006: Burkina Faso
- 2007: Al-Faisaly
- 2007: Al-Tai
- 2007–2008: ES Sétif
- 2008–2011: Al-Kharitiyath
- 2011: Qatar Olympic team
- 2011–2012: Al Ahli
- 2012–2013: Al-Kharitiyath
- 2014: CS Constantine
- 2015: JS Saoura
- 2015–2016: USM Alger (sporting director)
- 2017–2018: Olympique Khouribga
- 2018–2019: Al-Orouba
- 2020–2021: Morocco U-23
- 2021–2022: Al Ahli
- 2023: Niort
- * Club domestic league appearances and goals

Bernard Simondi (born 28 July 1953) is a French football coach and former player. He was most recently the head coach of Championnat National club Niort.

He played for SC Toulon, Stade Lavallois, FC Tours and AS Saint-Étienne.

After his playing career, he became a coach with Al-Nassr, Puget, Aubagne, Grenoble, US Créteil, Guinea, Benin, ES Sahel, Burkina Faso, ES Sétif, Al-Kharitiyath and Al-Ahly Doha.

He was shortlisted for the Guinea national team job in July 2016.
