= Bertrand Marchand =

French footballer and manager (1953–2023)

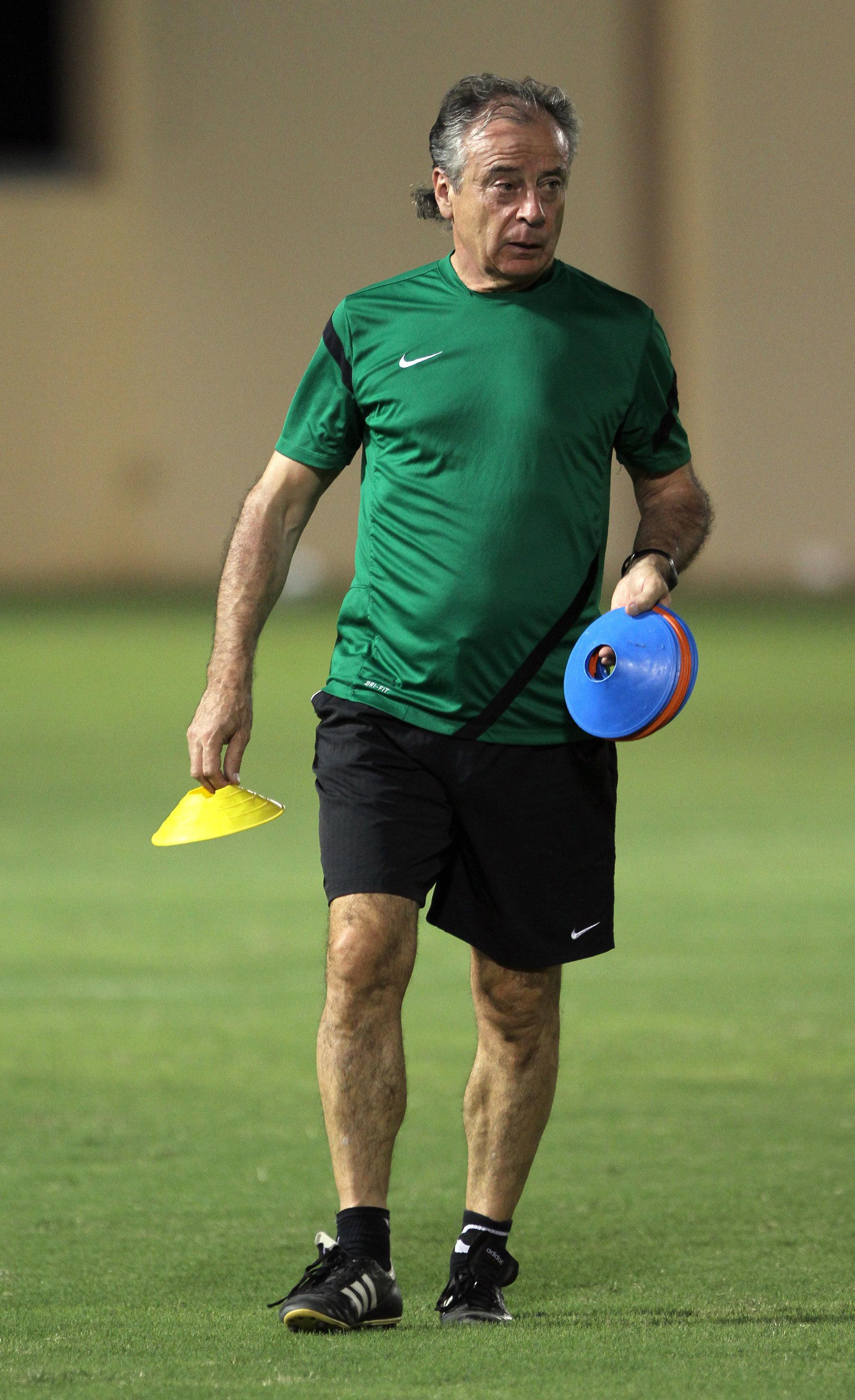
- Marchand in 2012

Personal information
- Date of birth: 27 April 1953
- Place of birth: Dinan, France
- Date of death: 26 August 2023 (aged 70)
- Height: 1.78 m (5 ft 10 in)
- Position: Defender

Youth career
- Entente Méné-Rance

Senior career*
Years	Team	Apps	(Gls)
1972–1980	Rennes		
1980–1982	Montmorillon		
1982–1985	Thouars Foot 79		

Managerial career
- 1985–1997: Thouars Foot 79
- 1997–2002: Rennes (youth)
- 2002–2004: Guingamp
- 2005–2007: Club Africain
- 2007–2008: Étoile du Sahel
- 2008–2010: Al-Khor
- 2010: Tunisia
- 2011–2012: Raja Casablanca
- 2012–2013: Umm Salal
- 2013–2015: Al-Kharaitiyat
- 2015–2016: RS Berkane
- 2017–2018: Club Africain
- 2019–2022: CS Chebba
- 2022: Club Africain
- * Club domestic league appearances and goals

Bertrand Marchand (27 April 1953 – 26 August 2023) was a French football player and manager.

== Career ==
After playing professionally for Rennes Marchand was player-coach then coach at Thouars Foot 79 from 1982 to 1997. Then he was at Rennes (educator at the training center then assistant coach) and at Guingamp (Ligue 1), where he directed the players of the first team of 2002 to 2004.

Marchand also trained in Tunisia with Club Africain and ES Sahel, club based in Sousse with which, in 2007, he won the 2007 CAF Champions League and reached the semi-final of the 2007 FIFA Club World Cup in Japan. He is the only French to date, players and coaches combined, to have achieved this performance. Following this course, he received the UNECATEF trophy. He also won the 2008 CAF Super Cup.

At the end of his contract with the Etoile du Sahel, several clubs in the Persian Gulf began to take an interest in this technician, particularly the Al Wahda FC, which would do anything to get him signed. A second rumor sent him to Egyptian side Zamalek, but it was ultimately in Qatar, at Al-Khor whered he signed for two years.

In June 2010, he became the coach of the Tunisian national team. On 15 December 2010, the federal office of FTF decided to dismiss Bertrand Marchand after two defeats and a draw in CAN 2012 qualifying matches.

The Raja de Casablanca announced in September 2011 that it had recruited the Frenchman Bertrand Marchand for a renewable year as a new coach.

On 16 April 2015, he was appointed head of Al Gharafa, a Qatari football club based in Doha, for a period of one month following the dismissal of Marco Paqueta.

In September 2019, he was appointed new coach of CS Chebba.

== Death ==
Bertrand Marchand died on 26 August 2023, at the age of 70.
