= Al Kharaitiyat SC =

Association football club in Qatar

Al Kharaitiyat
- Full name: Al Kharaitiyat Sport Club
- Nicknames: Thunders الصواعق
- Founded: 1996; 30 years ago
- Ground: Al-Khor SC Stadium
- Capacity: 21,282
- Chairman: Khalifa bin Thamer
- Head coach: Yousuf Adam Mahmoud
- League: Qatari Second Division
- 2024–25: Qatari Second Division, 3rd
- Website: www.alkharaitiyat.com
Home colours	Away colours

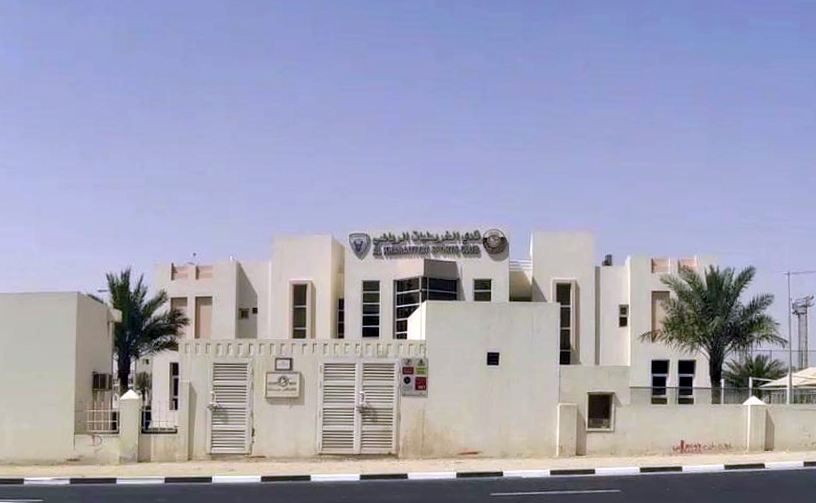
Al Kharaitiyat SC headquarters, Al Ebb Road, Al Kharaitiyat.

Al Kharaitiyat Sport Club (Arabic: نادي الخريطيات) is a Qatari sports club based in the town of Al Kharaitiyat, best known for its football team of the Qatari Second Division. They won promotion in 2004 and played in the Qatari Stars League the following season. However, they were relegated the following season. They once again regained their position in the top flight in the 2008–09 season.

== History ==
Al Kharaitiyat is among the newest sports clubs in Qatar, having been formed in 1996 as Al-Hilal. Among the founders were:

Founders
(Qatar) Sheikh Hamad bin Thamer Al Thani^{1}
(Qatar) Sheikh Khalifa bin Thamer Al Thani
(Qatar) Nasser Al-Mohammad Fadhalla
(Qatar) Meshal Mohammed Al-Ansari
(Qatar) Adel Ibrahim Al-Malik
(Qatar) Hassan Yousef Al-Hakim
(Qatar) Khalifa bin Fahad bin Mohammed Al Thani

Upon its formation, it was entered into the Qatari Second Division. After winning the second division title in 2004, they earned a spot in the top tier, the Qatar Stars League. Shortly after, the club was renamed to its current name, Al Kharaitiyat, on 19 October 2004 by a decision of the vice-president of the Qatar Olympic Committee in order to better represent the district it is located in. The team was relegated from the Stars League in the 2004–05 season after a 3–3 draw with Al Ahli on 6 April 2005 with two matches left to play in the season.

In 2008 the team was once again promoted to the Stars League.

== Supporters ==
A fan club was established in 2008 after the team won promotion to the Qatar Stars League.

== Stadium history ==
Stadium	Period
Qatar SC Stadium	1996–2012
Al-Khawr Stadium	2012–present

== Honours ==
=== Domestic ===
- Qatari Second Division
  - Winners (2): 2004, 2020
- Qatari Stars Cup
  - Runners-up (1): 2012

== Current squad ==
As of Qatari Second Division:

Note: Flags indicate national team as defined under FIFA eligibility rules; some limited exceptions apply. Players may hold more than one non-FIFA nationality.

No.	Pos.	Nation	Player
1	GK	QAT	Mahmoud Zakeri
2	DF	QAT	Abdulhamid Sibai
3	DF	FRA	Presnel Kimpembe
4	DF	URU	Marcos Gómez
5	MF	QAT	Mohammed Abdelnasser
6	DF	QAT	Saeed El-Hadj
7	FW	BUL	Nikolay Zlatev
8	MF	QAT	Issa Ghaderi
9	FW	QAT	Jassem Al-Jalabi
10	FW	ROU	Ștefan Bană
11	FW	QAT	Abdulrahman Al-Jassem
12	DF	QAT	Mohammed Al-Qahtani
13	GK	ECU	Lenín Ayoví
14	FW	QAT	Ahmed Al-Saadi

No.	Pos.	Nation	Player
17	MF	QAT	Ahmed Gamal
19	FW	FRA	Yassin Malloug
20	DF	QAT	Ali Al-Marri
25	MF	SRB	Nikola Krstić
29	MF	QAT	Ali Elgaili
30	GK	QAT	Fahad Al-Qasaimi
49	MF	YEM	Al Fahad Haidara
50	MF	QAT	Mohammed Idris
55	FW	ECU	Maelo Rentería
70	MF	SDN	Muayad Al-Sheikh
72	GK	QAT	Ahmed Al-Bagoori
78	DF	MAR	Kaïs Najeh
88	MF	QAT	Mohammed Afifa
99	MF	LBN	Adnan Iskandarani

== Personnel ==
=== Club staff ===
Last updated 11 November 2018.

Coaching staff
Head coach	(Qatar) Yousuf Adam Mahmoud
Assistant coach	(Chile) Julio Cesar Moreno
Goalkeeping coach	(Serbia) Zoran Stojanovic
Fitness coach	(Chile) Nelson Omar Garrido
Technical staff
Team manager	(Qatar) Torki Aman Salmeen
Director of football	(Qatar) Mansour Mussa
Deputy director	(Qatar) Abdulnasser al-saadi

=== Management ===
Position	Staff
President	Sheikh khalifa bin Thamer Al Thani
Vice-president	Jamal Al-shamlan
General secretary	Sheikh Ahmed bin thamer Al-Thani

Last updated: December 2011
Source: Board of Directors

== Managerial history ==
As of 20 May 2021

- (Qatar) Abdulaziz Ali Al Hammadi (1996)
- (Egypt) Mokhtar Mokhtar (2003–2005)
- (Brazil) João Francisco (2005)
- (Brazil) José Roberto Souza (2005–2006)
- (Egypt) Ayman Mansour (2006–2007)
- (Brazil) Luisinho Lemos (2007–2008)
- (Croatia) Rodion Gačanin (2008)
- (Serbia) Moscofetch Nebojsa (2008)
- (Serbia) Nebojša Vučković (2008)
- (Brazil) José Roberto Souza (2008) (CT)
- (France) Bernard Simondi (2008–2011)
- (Brazil) Arturzinho (2009) (CT)
- (Tunisia) Lutfi Benzarti (2011)
- (France) Laurent Banide (2012)
- (France) Bernard Simondi (2012–2013)
- (France) Bertrand Marchand (2013–2014)
- (Syria) Yasser Sibai (2014)
- (Bosnia and Herzegovina) Amar Osim (2014–2016)
- (Tunisia) Ahmad Al-Ajlani (2016–2018)
- (Syria) Yasser Sibai (2018)
- (Tunisia) Nacif Beyaoui (2018)
- (Morocco) Aziz El Amri (2018)
- (Qatar) Yousuf Adam (2018–2021)

== Notes ==
Note 1: Sheikh Hamad bin Thamer Al Thani served as the first president of the club.
