= List of Al Sadd SC seasons =

Seasons of Qatari football club

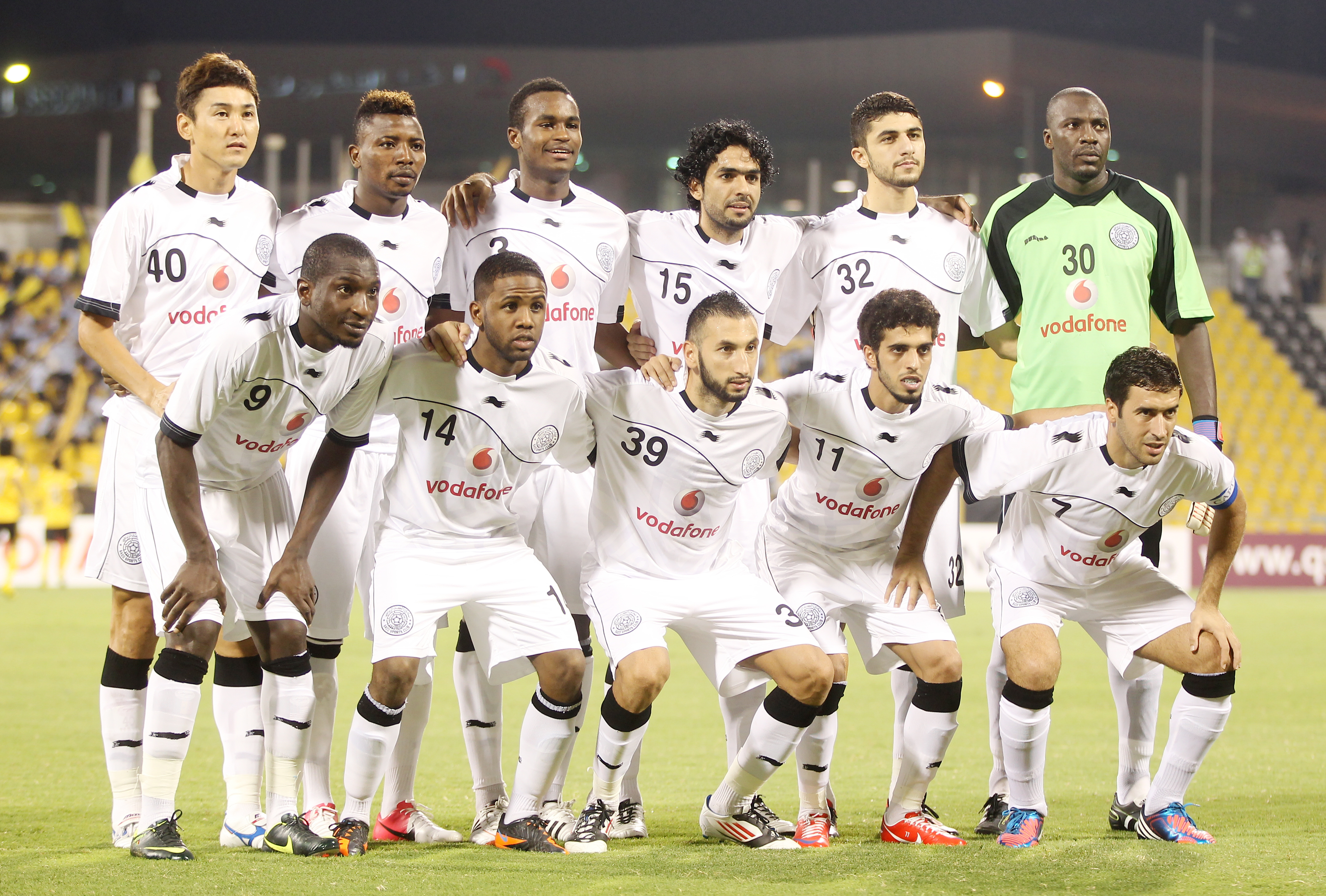
Al Sadd SC's team in 2012 with From Left to Right: Stand Up : Lee Jung-Soo - Kasola - Hassan - Al-Bloushi - Ibrahim Majid - Saqr. Sitting Niang - Khalfan Ibrahim - Belhadj - Al Haidos - Raúl.

Al Sadd Sports Club is a Qatari professional football club based in Doha. The club was formed in 1969 as Al Sadd Sports Club, and played their first competitive match in 1969, The club has won a total of 63 major trophies, At the local level the national championship a record 16 times also won the Emir of Qatar Cup a record 18 times, the Qatar Cup (ex) Crown Prince Cup a record 8 times, and the Sheikh Jassim Cup a record 15 times and outside the AFC Champions League two times and the Arab Champions League once. The club has also never been out of the top division of Qatari football since entering the Football League.

This is a list of the seasons played by Al Sadd SC from 1969 when the club first entered a league competition to the most recent seasons. The club's achievements in all major national and international competitions as well as the top scorers are listed. Top scorers in bold were also top scorers of Qatar Stars League. The list is separated into three parts, coinciding with the three major episodes of Qatari football:

== Seasons ==
(Qatar) QFA – season-by-season record of Al Sadd Sports Club
Season	League									Emir Cup	Other	Asia		Top goalscorer(s)		Ref.
Season	Division	Pos	Pts	P	W	D	L	GF	GA	Emir Cup	Other	Asia		Name	Goals	
1973–74	D1	**1st**								RU						
1974–75	D1									**W**						
1975–76	D1									Unknown						
1976–77	D1									**W**						
1977–78	D1									Unknown	**W**					
1978–79	D1	**1st**								Unknown	**W**			**Hassan Mattar**	11	
1979–80	D1	**1st**								Unknown	**W**					
1980–81	D1	**1st**								Unknown	**W**			**Hassan Mattar**	9	
1981–82	D1									**W**						
1982–83	D1									RU						
1983–84	D1	5th	11	12	4	3	5	12	11	Unknown						
1984–85	D1	5th	11	12	3	5	4	15	15	**W**	**W**					
1985–86	D1									**W**	**W**					
1986–87	D1	**1st**								RU						
1987–88	D1	**1st**								Unknown	**W**			**Hassan Jawhar**	11	
1988–89	D1	**1st**								Unknown		Asian Club Championship	**W**			
1989–90	D1									Unknown	**W**	Asian Club Championship	Grp			
1990–91	D1									**W**		Asian Club Championship	Grp			
1991–92	D1	3rd	22	16	9	4	3	22	14	Unknown		Cup Winners' Cup	R1			
1992–93	D1									RU						
1993–94	D1									**W**						
1994–95	D1									Unknown		Cup Winners' Cup	QF			
1995–96	D1	4th	34	16	9	7	0	24	9	Unknown	SF					
1996–97	D1	5th	27	16	7	6	3	19	9	Unknown	SF			Ali Daei	10	
1997–98	D1	3rd	26	16	7	5	4	25	13	Unknown	**W**			**Hussein Ammouta**	10	
1997–98	D1	3rd	26	16	7	5	4	25	13	Unknown	**W**			**Hussein Ammouta**	10	
1998–99	D1	3rd	33	16	10	3	3	29	15	QF	SF					
1999–2000	D1	**1st**	38	16	12	2	2	36	8	**W**	SF	Asian Club Championship	R2	Fahad Al Kuwari	8	
1999–2000	D1	**1st**	38	16	12	2	2	36	8	**W**	**W**	Asian Club Championship	R2	Fahad Al Kuwari	8	
2000–01	D1	6th	24	16	7	3	6	25	21	**W**		Cup Winners' Cup	R2			
2001–02	D1	4th	25	16	7	4	5	31	30	RU	SF	Cup Winners' Cup	3rd			
2001–02	D1	4th	25	16	7	4	5	31	30	RU	**W**	Cup Winners' Cup	3rd			
2002–03	D1	2nd	31	18	9	4	5	30	14	**W**	**W**	AFC Champions League	Grp			
2002–03	D1	2nd	31	18	9	4	5	30	14	**W**	Grp	AFC Champions League	Grp			
2003–04	D1	**1st**	42	18	13	3	2	38	10	SF	RU	Champions League	Grp	Carlos Tenorio	18	
2003–04	D1	**1st**	42	18	13	3	2	38	10	SF	Grp	Champions League	Grp	Carlos Tenorio	18	
2004–05	QSL	7th	34	27	9	7	1	35	35	**W**	Grp	Champions League	QF	Abdul Kader Keïta	10	
2005–06	QSL	**1st**	52	27	16	4	7	48	32	SF	**W**	Champions League	Grp	**Carlos Tenorio**	21	
2005–06	QSL	**1st**	52	27	16	4	7	48	32	SF	SF	Champions League	Grp	**Carlos Tenorio**	21	
2006–07	QSL	**1st**	55	27	17	4	6	52	29	**W**	**W** **W**	Champions League	Grp	Márcio Emerson Passos	18	
2007–08	QSL	2nd	53	27	16	5	6	54	38	SF	**W**	Champions League	Grp	Carlos Tenorio	13	
2007–08	QSL	2nd	53	27	16	5	6	54	38	SF	SF	Champions League	Grp	Carlos Tenorio	13	
2008–09	QSL	2nd	52	27	15	9	3	60	25	SF	SF; SF			Khalfan Ibrahim	15	
2009–10	QSL	2nd	50	22	15	5	2	55	22	SF	SF; SF	Champions League	Grp	Leandro	20	
2010–11	QSL	6th	36	22	11	3	8	32	26	QF	SF	Champions League	**W**	Ali Afif	8	
2011–12	QSL	4th	36	22	10	6	6	35	24	RU	RU	FIFA Club World Cup	3rd	Khalfan Ibrahim	7	
2011–12	QSL	4th	36	22	10	6	6	35	24	RU	Grp	FIFA Club World Cup	3rd	Khalfan Ibrahim	7	
2012–13	QSL	**1st**	51	22	16	3	3	47	23	RU	RU; RU			Mahmoud, Ibrahim	10	
2013–14	QSL	3rd	47	26	13	8	5	54	30	**W**	SF	Champions League	QF	Khalfan Ibrahim	14	
2013–14	QSL	3rd	47	26	13	8	5	54	30	**W**	Grp	Champions League	QF	Khalfan Ibrahim	14	
2014–15	QSL	2nd	57	26	17	6	3	68	35	**W**	SF	Champions League	R16	Al Haidos, Ibrahim	11	
2014–15	QSL	2nd	57	26	17	6	3	68	35	**W**	**W**	Champions League	R16	Al Haidos, Ibrahim	11	
2015–16	QSL	3rd	47	26	13	8	5	54	38	RU	SF	Champions League	PO	Hassan Al Haidos	12	
2015–16	QSL	3rd	47	26	13	8	5	54	38	RU	RU	Champions League	PO	Hassan Al Haidos	12	
2016–17	QSL	2nd	61	26	18	7	1	77	23	**W**	**W**	Champions League	PO	Baghdad Bounedjah	23	
2017–18	QSL	2nd	49	22	16	1	5	68	25	SF	RU	Champions League	SF	Baghdad Bounedjah	16	
2017–18	QSL	2nd	49	22	16	1	5	68	25	SF	**W**	Champions League	SF	Baghdad Bounedjah	16	
2018–19	QSL	**1st**	57	22	18	3	1	100	22	RU		Champions League	SF	**Baghdad Bounedjah**	39	
2019–20 (Note: The league was halted on 16 March 2020 due to COVID-19 pandemic in Qatar, then later resumed on 24 July 2020.)	QSL	3rd	45	22	14	3	5	51	29	**W**	**W** **W**	Champions League (Note: On 9 July 2020, AFC announced new schedule for 2020 AFC Champions League group stage. On 16 July 2020, AFC announced that Qatar would host 2020 AFC Champions League in the West region from the group stage to the semi-finals. On 27 July 2020, AFC confirmed that Malaysia would host matches of Group G and H.)	R16	**Akram Afif**	15	
2019–20	QSL	3rd	45	22	14	3	5	51	29	**W**	**W** **W**	FIFA Club World Cup	R2	**Akram Afif**	15	
2020–21	QSL	**1st**	60	22	19	3	0	77	14	**W**	**W**	Champions League (Note: On 11 March 2021, AFC confirmed the hosts for the group stage, except for Group H and I whose hosts will be decided at a later date. On 10 May 2021, AFC confirmed the hosts for Group H and I.)	Grp	**Baghdad Bounedjah**	21	
2021–22	QSL	**1st**	62	22	20	2	0	80	24	SF		Champions League	Grp	André Ayew	16	
2022–23	QSL	3rd	44	22	14	2	6	46	26	RU	RU			Baghdad Bounedjah	15	
2023–24	QSL	**1st**	49	22	15	4	3	65	21	**W**		Champions League	Grp	Akram Afif	30	
2024–25	QSL	**1st**	52	22	17	1	4	62	23	QF	**W**	Champions League	QF	Akram Afif	23	
2025–26	QSL									R16		Champions League	Grp			

- Note 1: The first official Qatari Football League season was held in 1972–73.
- Note 2: Competition was not held that year.

== Key ==
Key to league record:

- P = Played
- W = Games won
- D = Games drawn
- L = Games lost
- GF = Goals for
- GA = Goals against
- Pts = Points
- Pos = Final position

Key to divisions:

- 1 = QSL
- 2 = D1

Key to rounds:

- UNW = Unknown
- DNE = Did not enter
- NP = Not played
- PR = Preliminary round
- Grp = Group stage
- R1 = First Round
- R2 = Second Round
- PO = Play-off round
- R32 = Round of 32
- R16 = Round of 16
- QF = Quarter-finals
- SF = Semi-finals
- RU = Runners-up
- W = Winners

Champions	Runners-up	Promoted	Relegated

Division shown in bold to indicate a change in division.
Top scorers shown in bold are players who were also top scorers in their division that season.

== Honours ==
=== National ===
Competition	Titles	Winning years or seasons
Qatar Stars League	16	1971–72, 1973–74, 1978–79, 1979–80, 1980–81, 1986–87, 1987–88, 1988–89, 1999–2000, 2003–04, 2005–06, 2006–07, 2012–13, 2018–19, 2020–21, 2021–22
Emir of Qatar Cup	18	1974–75, 1977–78, 1981–82, 1984–85, 1985–86, 1987–88, 1990–91, 1993–94, 1999–2000, 2000–01, 2002–03, 2004–05, 2006–07, 2014, 2015, 2017, 2020, 2021
Qatar Cup (ex) Crown Prince Cup	8	1998, 2003, 2006, 2007, 2008, 2017, 2020, 2021
Sheikh Jassim Cup	15	1977, 1978, 1979, 1981, 1985, 1986, 1988, 1990, 1997, 1999, 2001, 2006, 2014, 2017, 2019

=== Asia ===
Competition	Titles	Winning years or seasons
AFC Champions League	2	1988–89, 2011

=== Regional ===
Competition	Titles	Winning years or seasons
Arab Champions League	1	2001
GCC Champions League	1	1991
