= Masoud Zeraei =

Qatari footballer (born 1979)

Personal information
- Full name: Masoud Mohmad Gholam Reza Zeraei
- Date of birth: 31 March 1979 (age 47)
- Place of birth: Doha, Qatar
- Height: 1.82 m (6 ft 0 in)
- Position: Goalkeeper

Team information
- Current team: Al Arabi (Goalkeeper Coach)

Youth career
- 1995–1999: Al Arabi

Senior career*
| Years | Team | Apps | (Gls) |
| 1999–2019 | Al Arabi | 126 | (0) |

International career
| 2011 | Qatar U23 | 1 | (0) |
- * Club domestic league appearances and goals as of 11:33, 28 December 2011 (UTC)

Masoud Zeraei (Persian: مسعود زراعی; born 31 March 1979) is a retired footballer who played as a goalkeeper. Born in Doha, Qatar, He is originally of Borazjan descent.

== Playing career ==
Zeraei spent his entire career with Al Arabi, having joined the club at the age of 16 through the efforts of Dr. Abdullah al-Mal. Despite his long-standing commitment, he has voiced frustration over not being regularly included in the first team throughout the years. Zeraei has cited his idols to be Oliver Kahn, Ahmed Khalil, and Farid Mahboub.

Zeraei came through Al Arabi as a academy prodigy and was eventually promoted to the first team as a backup goalie. Making his debut against Al Rayyan in the semi-final of the 1998 Emir Cup. He also played alongside the likes of Stefan Effenberg and Gabriel Batistuta, He reached the peak of his career around the late 2010s, securing the Sheikh Jassem Cup 3 times, in 2008, and then winning it back to back in 2010 and 2011 earning several clean sheets while also featuring regularly as a starter. He also received the role of captaining Al Arabi on multiple occasions due to his leadership skills on the pitch and loyalty to the club.

Zeraei had also received offers from numerous clubs, including notably a 2-year deal from El Jaish SC and an offer from Al Rayyan. He subsequently rejected the offers, claiming his bond with Dr. Abdullah al-Mal, president of Al Arabi, is a father-son bond and vowed he would remain in Al Arabi if asked to. After spending around 20 years at the club he decided to retire in 2019 stating that "He wished his team the best".

Zeraei was called up for the Qatar under-23 team in the 2011 GCC Games for the third place match against UAE. As Al Arabi's game against Al Sadd was postponed due to Al Sadd's involvement in the AFC Champions League. However, Qatar lost the game 2-0 with Abdulla Hassan and Fahad Salim scoring. Qatar came out fourth place in the competition.

== Post-retirement ==
Masoud Zeraei was appointed as the goalkeeping coach of Al Arabi in 2021.

== Career statistics ==
Statistics accurate as of 22 May 2019

| Club | Season | League | League | | Cup^{1} | | League Cup^{2} | | Continental^{3} | | Total | |
| Club | Season | League | Apps | Goals | Apps | Goals | Apps | Goals | Apps | Goals | Apps | Goals |
|---|---|---|---|---|---|---|---|---|---|---|---|---|
| Al-Arabi | 1998–99 | QSL | 0 | 0 | 1 | | | | – | – | | |
| Al-Arabi | 1999–00 | QSL | 1 | 0 | | | | | – | – | | |
| Al-Arabi | 2000–01 | QSL | 0 | 0 | | | | | – | – | | |
| Al-Arabi | 2001–02 | QSL | 1 | 0 | | | | | – | – | | |
| Al-Arabi | 2002–03 | QSL | 0 | 0 | | | | | – | – | | |
| Al-Arabi | 2003–04 | QSL | 5 | 0 | | | | | – | – | | |
| Al-Arabi | 2004–05 | QSL | 4 | 0 | | | | | – | – | | |
| Al-Arabi | 2005–06 | QSL | 19 | 0 | | | | | – | – | | |
| Al-Arabi | 2006–07 | QSL | 13 | 0 | | | | | – | – | | |
| Al-Arabi | 2007–08 | QSL | 3 | 0 | | | | | – | – | | |
| Al-Arabi | 2008–09 | QSL | 9 | 0 | | | | | – | – | | |
| Al-Arabi | 2009–10 | QSL | 10 | 0 | | | | | – | – | | |
| Al-Arabi | 2010–11 | QSL | 2 | 0 | | | | | – | – | | |
| Al-Arabi | 2011–12 | QSL | 2 | 0 | | | | | 1 | 0 | | |
| Al-Arabi | 2012–13 | QSL | 13 | 0 | | | | | – | – | | |
| Al-Arabi | 2013–14 | QSL | 5 | 0 | | | | | – | – | | |
| Al-Arabi | 2014–15 | QSL | 8 | 0 | | | | | – | – | | |
| Al-Arabi | 2015–16 | QSL | 4 | 0 | | | | | – | – | | |
| Al-Arabi | 2016–17 | QSL | 3 | 0 | | | | | – | – | | |
| Al-Arabi | 2017–18 | QSL | 10 | 0 | | | | | – | – | | |
| | 2018–19 | | 13 | 0 | | | – | – | | | | |
| Career total | | | 126 | 0 | 1 | | | | 1 | 0 | 126 | |

^{1}Includes Emir of Qatar Cup.

^{2}Includes Sheikh Jassem Cup.

^{3}Includes AFC Champions League.

== Honours ==
=== Club ===
Player

Al-Arabi

- Sheikh Jassem Cup (3): 2008, 2010, 2011

=== Managerial ===
Goalkeeping Coach

- Qatar–UAE Super Cup: 2023–24
- Emir of Qatar Cup: 2023
- Qatar Stars League runner-up: 2022–23
