= Mustafa Jalal =

Qatari footballer (born 1983)

Personal information
- Full name: Mustafa Jalal Jaafari
- Date of birth: 2 February 1983 (age 43)
- Place of birth: Qatar
- Height: 1.78 m (5 ft 10 in)
- Positions: Center back; defensive midfielder

Senior career*
Years	Team	Apps	(Gls)
1999–2017	Al Khor	343	(5)
2017–2025	Al Shahaniya	53	(0)

International career
2003–2007	Qatar	5	(0)
- * Club domestic league appearances and goals

Mustafa Jalal (Arabic: مصطفى جلال; born 2 February 1983) is a Qatari footballer who plays as a center back or defensive midfielder. He previously played for the Qatar national team between 2003 and 2007.

== Club career statistics ==
Statistics accurate as of 21 December 2014

Club	Season	League	League		League Cup^{2}		Continental^{3}		Total	
Club	Season	League	Apps	Goals	Apps	Goals	Apps	Goals	Apps	Goals
Al Khor	QSL									
Al Khor	QSL	1999–00	2	0						
Al Khor	QSL	2000–01	16	0						
Al Khor	QSL	2001–02	11	0						
Al Khor	QSL	2002–03	16	0						
Al Khor	QSL	2003–04	15	1						
Al Khor	QSL	2004–05	24	1						
Al Khor	QSL	2005–06	11	0						
Al Khor	QSL	2006–07	26	2						
Al Khor	QSL	2007–08	25	0						
Al Khor	QSL	2008–09	27	0						
Al Khor	QSL	2009–10	22	1						
Al Khor	QSL	2010–11	22	0						
Al Khor	QSL	2011–12	21	0						
Al Khor	QSL	2012–13	22	0						
Al Khor	QSL	2013–14	24	0						
Al Khor	QSL	2014–15	23	0						
Al Khor	Total		307	5						
Career total			307	5						

^{2}Includes Sheikh Jassem Cup.

^{3}Includes AFC Champions League.
