= Nayef Mubarak Al-Khater =

Qatari footballer (born 1978)

Nayef Al Khater
Personal information
- Full name: Nayef Mubarak Al Khater
- Date of birth: 10 May 1978 (age 48)
- Place of birth: Qatar
- Height: 1.68 m (5 ft 6 in)
- Position: Defender

Senior career*
Years	Team	Apps	(Gls)
1996–2015	Al Wakrah	218	(14)
2002–2003	→ Al Sadd (loan)	15	(0)
2007	→ Al Rayyan (loan)	7	(0)

International career
1995	Qatar U-17		
2001–2004	Qatar	17	(1)
- * Club domestic league appearances and goals

Nayef Al Khater (born May 10, 1978) is a Qatari football player. He has played for Al Wakrah and the Qatar national team as a defender.

== Biography ==
He took part in the 1995 FIFA U-17 World Championship, representing Qatar. He also represented the senior team from 2001 to 2004, earning 17 caps and 1 goal.

Al Khater played his entire career in Al Wakrah, only going on loan temporarily to other Qatari clubs. He is one of the most capped players of Al Wakrah.

=== Club career statistics ===
Statistics accurate as of 23 February 2012

Club	Season	League	League		Reserve League		League		Reserve League		Total	
Club	Season	League	Apps	Goals	Apps	Goals	Yellow card	Red card	Yellow card	Red card	Apps	Goals
Al Wakrah	1995-96	QSL	1	0	0	0	0	0	0	0	1	0
Al Wakrah	1996–97	QSL	14	0	0	0	3	0	0	0	14	0
Al Wakrah	1997–98	QSL	9	0	0	0	0	1	0	0	9	0
Al Wakrah	1998-99	QSL	11	1	0	0	1	1	0	0	11	1
Al Wakrah	1999-00	QSL	16	4	0	0	2	0	0	0	16	4
Al Wakrah	2000–01	QSL	12	1	0	0	3	0	0	0	12	1
Al Wakrah	2001–02	QSL	13	2	0	0	3	1	0	0	13	2
→ Al Sadd (loan)	2002-03	QSL	15	0	0	0	3	1	0	0	15	0
Al Wakrah	2003-04	QSL	14	0	0	0	5	0	0	0	14	0
Al Wakrah	2004–05	QSL	22	2	0	0	4	0	0	0	22	2
Al Wakrah	2005–06	QSL	22	2	0	0	10	0	0	0	22	2
→ Al Rayyan (loan)	2006–07	QSL	7	0	1	0	3	0	0	0	8	0
Al Wakrah	2006–07	QSL	11	0	0	0	5	0	0	0	11	0
Al Wakrah	2007–08	QSL	25	0	1	0	5	0	1	0	26	0
Al Wakrah	2008–09	QSL	10	0	6	0	2	0	2	0	16	0
Al Wakrah	2009–10	QSL	21	2	3	0	1	0	0	0	24	2
Al Wakrah	2010-11	QSL	12	0	10	0	0	0	2	0	22	0
Al Wakrah	2011-12	QSL	5	0	11	0	0	0	4	0	16	0
Total		QSL	218	14	31	0	44	3	9	0	249	14
Career total			240	14	32	0	50	4	9	0	272	14
