= Hussain Al-Romaihi =

Qatari footballer (born 1974)

Personal information
- Full name: Hussain Ali Sheib Al-Romaihi
- Date of birth: 12 September 1974 (age 52)
- Place of birth: Qatar
- Height: 1.82 m (6 ft 0 in)
- Position: Goalkeeper

Youth career
- 1986–1994: Qatar SC

Senior career*
Years	Team	Apps	(Gls)
1994–2013	Qatar SC	247	(0)

International career
2000–2007	Qatar	38	(0)
- * Club domestic league appearances and goals

Hussain Al-Romaihi (Arabic: حسين الرميحي; born 12 September 1974) is a retired Qatari footballer who played for Qatar SC as a goalkeeper. He also previously played for the Qatar national team.

He was appointed as director of football for Qatar SC in December 2014.

== Career ==
Al-Romaihi played for Qatar SC since he was 12 years old, earning more than 200 caps for the senior team to make him one of the highest capped players of all time for Qatar SC. He was also capped 38 times by the Qatar national team between 2000 and 2007. He also represented Qatar at the 1991 FIFA U-17 World Championship.

His talents were first discovered by the youth coach of Qatar SC, Ahmed Abdul-Azim.

=== Club career statistics ===
Statistics accurate as of 10 February 2012

Club	Season	League	League		Reserve League		League Cup^{2}		Continental^{3}		Total	
Club	Season	League	Apps	Goals	Apps	Goals	Apps	Goals	Apps	Goals	Apps	Goals
Qatar SC	QSL											
Qatar SC	QSL	1994–95	8	0	0	0						
Qatar SC	QSL	1995–96	8	0	0	0						
Qatar SC	QSL	1996–97	15	0	0	0						
Qatar SC	QSL	1997–98	13	0	0	0						
Qatar SC	QSL	1998–99	9	0	0	0						
Qatar SC	QSL	1999–00	14	0	0	0						
Qatar SC	QSL	2000–01	15	0	0	0						
Qatar SC	QSL	2001–02	15	0	0	0						
Qatar SC	QSL	2002–03	16	0	0	0						
Qatar SC	QSL	2003–04	18	0	0	0						
Qatar SC	QSL	2004–05	22	0	0	0						
Qatar SC	QSL	2005–06	25	0	0	0						
Qatar SC	QSL	2006–07	17	0	3	0						
Qatar SC	QSL	2007–08	25	0	0	0						
Qatar SC	QSL	2008–09	3	0	1	0						
Qatar SC	QSL	2009–10	1	0	1	0						
Qatar SC	QSL	2010–11	4	0	2	0						
Qatar SC	QSL	2011–12	7	0	4	0						
Qatar SC	QSL	2012–13	12	0	0	0						
Qatar SC	Total		247	0	8	0						
Career total			247	0	8	0						

^{2}Includes Sheikh Jassem Cup.

^{3}Includes AFC Champions League.

== See also ==
List of one-club men
