= Basel Samih =

Qatari footballer (born 1981)

Personal information
- Full name: Basel Samih M. Zaidan
- Date of birth: 17 June 1981 (age 45)
- Place of birth: Jordan
- Height: 1.88 m (6 ft 2 in)
- Position: Goalkeeper

Senior career*
| Years | Team | Apps | (Gls) |
| 2000–2011 | Al-Sadd | 21 | (0) |
| 2002–2003 | → Al-Arabi (loan) | 15 | (0) |
| 2007–2008 | → Al-Khor (loan) | 11 | (0) |
| 2011–2015 | Al-Ahli | 36 | (0) |
| 2012–2013 | →El Jaish | 0 | (0) |
| 2015–2016 | Mesaimeer | 21 | (0) |
| 2016–2017 | Muaither SC | 26 | (0) |
| 2017–2019 | Umm Salal | 27 | (0) |
| 2019–2021 | Al-Markhiya | | |
- * Club domestic league appearances and goals as of 11:21, 28 December 2011 (UTC)

Basel Samih Zaidan (born 17 June 1981) is a Qatari footballer who is a goalkeeper.

Samih played for Umm Salal in the 2007 AFC Champions League. He also appeared for Qatar in an unofficial match at the 2002 West Asian Games.

== Club career statistics ==
Statistics accurate as of 21 August 2011

| Club | Season | League | League | | Cup^{1} | | League Cup^{2} | | Continental^{3} | | Total | |
| Club | Season | League | Apps | Goals | Apps | Goals | Apps | Goals | Apps | Goals | Apps | Goals |
|---|---|---|---|---|---|---|---|---|---|---|---|---|
| Al-Sadd | 2000–01 | QSL | 1 | 0 | | | | | | | | |
| Al-Sadd | 2001–02 | QSL | 2 | 0 | | | | | | | | |
| Al-Sadd | 2003–04 | QSL | 1 | 0 | | | | | | | | |
| Al-Sadd | 2004–05 | QSL | 2 | 0 | | | | | | | | |
| Al-Sadd | 2005–06 | QSL | 1 | 0 | | | | | | | | |
| Al-Sadd | 2006–07 | QSL | 9 | 0 | | | | | | | | |
| Al-Sadd | 2008–09 | QSL | 1 | 0 | | | | | | | | |
| Al-Sadd | 2009–10 | QSL | 3 | 0 | | | | | | | | |
| Al-Sadd | 2010–11 | QSL | 1 | 0 | | | | | | | | |
| Al-Sadd | Total | | 21 | 0 | | | | | | | | |
| Al-Arabi | 2002–03 | QSL | 15 | 0 | | | | | | | | |
| Al-Arabi | Total | | 15 | 0 | | | | | | | | |
| Al-Khor | 2007–08 | QSL | 11 | 0 | | | | | | | | |
| Al-Khor | Total | | 11 | 0 | | | | | | | | |
| Al-Ahli | 2011–12 | QSL | | | | | | | | | | |
| Al-Ahli | Total | | | | | | | | | | | |
| Career total | | | 47 | 0 | | | | | | | | |

^{1}Includes Emir of Qatar Cup.

^{2}Includes Sheikh Jassem Cup.

^{3}Includes AFC Champions League.
