= Ali Rahma Al-Marri =

Qatari footballer (born 1983)

Ali Rahma Al Marri
Personal information
- Date of birth: 27 December 1983 (age 42)
- Place of birth: Qatar
- Height: 1.70 m (5 ft 7 in)
- Position: Midfielder

Team information
- Current team: Al-Wakrah (manager)

Senior career*
Years	Team	Apps	(Gls)
2001–2007	Al Rayyan	121	(10)
2007–2008	Al Khor	17	(1)
2008–2009	Al Arabi	21	(0)
2009–2011	Al Sailiya	38	(0)
2011–2015	Al-Wakrah	9	(1)

International career
2002–2004	Qatar	15	(0)

Managerial career
- 2024–: Al-Wakrah
- * Club domestic league appearances and goals

Ali Rahma Al Marri (born 27 December 1983) is a former Qatari footballer. He also previously played for the Qatar national team.

== Career ==
He was capped 15 times by the Qatar national team between 2002 and 2004.

=== Club career statistics ===
Statistics accurate as of 10 February 2012

Club	Season	League	League		Reserve League		League Cup^{2}		Continental^{3}		Total	
Club	Season	League	Apps	Goals	Apps	Goals	Apps	Goals	Apps	Goals	Apps	Goals
Al Rayyan	2000–01	QSL	15	0	0	0						
Al Rayyan	2001–02	QSL	12	2	0	0						
Al Rayyan	2002–03	QSL	10	2	0	0						
Al Rayyan	2003–04	QSL	17	0	0	0						
Al Rayyan	2004–05	QSL	23	4	0	0						
Al Rayyan	2005–06	QSL	22	2	0	0						
Al Rayyan	2006–07	QSL	22	0	3	2						
Total		QSL	121	10	3	2						
Al Khor	2007–08	QSL	17	1	6	0						
Al Arabi	2008–09	QSL	21	0	5	1						
Al Sailiya	2009–10	QSL	22	0	0	0						
Al Sailiya	2010–11	QSL	16	0	1	0						
Total		QSL	38	0	1	0						
Al-Wakrah	2011-12	QSL	9	1	3	1						
Career total			206	12	18	4						

^{2}Includes Sheikh Jassem Cup.

^{3}Includes AFC Champions League.
