= Mohammed Saad Al-Sulaiti =

Qatari footballer (born 1985)

Mohammed Al-Sulaiti
Personal information
- Full name: Mohammed Saad Abdullah Salem Al-Sulaiti
- Date of birth: 11 April 1985 (age 41)
- Place of birth: Qatar
- Height: 1.75 m (5 ft 9 in)
- Position: Midfielder

Senior career*
Years	Team	Apps	(Gls)
2002–2018	Al-Wakrah	132	(3)

International career
2005–2006	Qatar	2	(0)
- * Club domestic league appearances and goals

Mohammed Saad Al-Sulaiti (born 4 April 1985) is a Qatari footballer who currently plays as a midfielder. He also previously played for the Qatar national team.

== Career ==
He was capped 2 times by the Qatar national team between 2005 and 2006.

=== Club career statistics ===
Statistics accurate as of 24 February 2012

Club	Season	League	League		Reserve League		League Cup^{2}		Continental^{3}		Total	
Club	Season	League	Apps	Goals	Apps	Goals	Apps	Goals	Apps	Goals	Apps	Goals
Al Wakrah	2002–03	QSL	3	0	0	0						
Al Wakrah	2003–04	QSL	2	0	0	0						
Al Wakrah	2004–05	QSL	14	1	0	0						
Al Wakrah	2005–06	QSL	25	2	0	0						
Al Wakrah	2006–07	QSL	16	0	4	0						
Al Wakrah	2007–08	QSL	3	0	1	0						
Al Wakrah	2008–09	QSL	14	0	4	0						
Al Wakrah	2009–10	QSL	17	0	1	0						
Al Wakrah	2010–11	QSL	21	0	0	0						
Al Wakrah	2011–12	QSL	17	0	0	0						
Al Wakrah	Total		132	3	10	0					142	3
Career total			132	3	10	0					142	3

^{2}Includes Sheikh Jassem Cup.

^{3}Includes AFC Champions League.
