= Khaled Al Zakiba =

Qatari footballer

Personal information
- Full name: Khaled Saleh Al Zakiba
- Date of birth
- Place of birth: Qatar
- Height: 1.75 m (5 ft 9 in)
- Position: Defender

Senior career*
Years	Team	Apps	(Gls)
2004–2007	Al Shamal	26	(0)
2007–2016	Qatar SC	130	(3)
2016–2018	Al-Rayyan	11	(0)
2017–2018	→ Umm Salal (loan)	3	(0)
2018–2019	Muaither		
2019–2020	Al Bidda		

International career
2009	Qatar	5	(0)
- * Club domestic league appearances and goals

Khaled Al Zakiba is a Qatari footballer who is a defender. He is a member of the Qatar national football team.

== Club career statistics ==
Statistics accurate as of 21 August 2011

Club	Season	League	League		Cup^{1}		League Cup^{2}		Continental^{3}		Total	
Club	Season	League	Apps	Goals	Apps	Goals	Apps	Goals	Apps	Goals	Apps	Goals
Al-Shamal	2003–04	QSL	5	0								
Al-Shamal	2004–05	QSL	4	0								
Al-Shamal	2005–06	QSL	0	0								
Al-Shamal	2006–07	QSL	17	0								
Al-Shamal	Total		26	0								
Qatar SC	2007–08	QSL	16	1								
Qatar SC	2008–09	QSL	19	0								
Qatar SC	2009–10	QSL	21	0								
Qatar SC	2010–11	QSL	1	0								
Qatar SC	2011-12	QSL										
Qatar SC	Total		57	1								
Career total			83	1								

^{1}Includes Emir of Qatar Cup.

^{2}Includes Sheikh Jassem Cup.

^{3}Includes AFC Champions League.
