= 2012–13 Qatar Stars League =

49th season of top-tier football league in Qatar

Qatar Stars League
- Season: 2012–13
- Champions: Al Sadd; 13th title
- Relegated: Al-Sailiya
- AFC Champions League: Al Sadd; Lekhwiya; El Jaish
- Top goalscorer: (Qatar) Sebastián Soria (19 goals)

The 2012–13 Qatari League, also known as Qatari Stars League, was the 40th edition of top level football championship in Qatar. The season started on 15 September 2012 and took a monthlong break from 21 December to 21 January 2013 due to the 21st Arabian Gulf Cup. Lekhwiya were the defending champions. Al Sadd won the league for the 13th time in their history, making them the most successful team in the Qatar Stars League.

== Teams ==
Al Ahli were relegated to the second level league after finishing bottom in the last season campaign.

Al-Sailiya were promoted as the 2nd level champions and are back after one season away from the top flight.

=== Stadia and locations ===
Locations of teams in the 2012–13 Qatari League

Club	City/Town	Stadium	Capacity
Al-Arabi	Doha	Grand Hamad Stadium	13,000
Al-Gharafa	Al Gharrafa	Thani bin Jassim Stadium	22,000
Al Kharaitiyat	Al Kharaitiyat	Al-Khor SC Stadium	12,000
Al-Khor	Al Khor	Al-Khor SC Stadium	12,000
Al-Rayyan	Al Rayyan	Ahmad bin Ali Stadium	22,000
Al Sadd	Doha	Jassim bin Hamad Stadium	10,000
Al-Sailiya	Al Sailiya	Ahmad bin Ali Stadium ^{1}	22,000
Al-Wakrah	Al Wakrah	Al Janoub Stadium	12,000
El Jaish	Duhail	Suheim bin Hamad Stadium	12,000
Lekhwiya	Doha	Abdullah bin Khalifa Stadium	10,000
Qatar SC	Doha	Suheim bin Hamad Stadium	12,000
Umm Salal	Umm Salal	Grand Hamad Stadium	13,000

^{1} Al-Sailiya do not have a stadium of their own so they share with Al-Rayyan.

=== Personnel and kits ===
Note: Flags indicate national team as has been defined under FIFA eligibility rules. Players may hold more than one non-FIFA nationality.

Team	Manager	Captain	Kit manufacturer	Shirt sponsor
Al-Arabi	(Morocco) Abdelaziz Bennij	(Qatar) Masoud Zeraei	Adidas	QPM
Al-Gharafa	(Tunisia) Habib Sadegh	(Brazil) Alex	Erreà	Vodafone
Al Kharaitiyat	(France) Bernard Simondi	(Qatar) Nabeel Anwar	BURRDA	Al-Khuratiyat Co.
Al-Khor	(Romania) László Bölöni	(Qatar) Mustafa Jalal	Adidas	Qatar Airways
Al-Rayyan	(Uruguay) Diego Aguirre	(Qatar) Fábio César	Adidas	Rayyan Co.
Al Sadd	(Morocco) Hussein Ammouta	(Qatar) Abdulla Koni	BURRDA	Vodafone
Al-Sailiya	(Qatar) Abdullah Mubarak	(Qatar) Abdulla Darwish	Nike	Qatar Islamic Bank
Al-Wakrah	(Bosnia and Herzegovina) Mehmed Baždarević	(Iraq) Ali Rehema	Nike	Opel
El Jaish	(Romania) Răzvan Lucescu	(Algeria) Karim Ziani	Nike	Masrat Rayan
Lekhwiya	(Belgium) Eric Gerets	(France) Dame Traoré	BURRDA	Masrat Rayan
Qatar SC	(Brazil) Sebastião Lazaroni	(Qatar) Hussain Al-Romaihi	Adidas	QatarEnergy
Umm Salal	(France) Bertrand Marchand	(Australia) Sasa Ognenovski	Nike	Global Sports

=== Managerial changes ===
Team	Outgoing manager	Manner of departure	Date of vacancy	Incoming manager	Date of appointment
El Jaish	(Brazil) Péricles Chamusca	Contract expired	9 May 2012	(Romania) Răzvan Lucescu	9 May 2012
Al Sadd	(Uruguay) Jorge Fossati	Contract expired	19 May 2012	(Morocco) Hussein Ammouta	1 June 2012
Al-Khor	(France) Alain Perrin	Signed by Qatar U-23	21 May 2012	(Romania) László Bölöni	21 June 2012
Al-Wakrah	(Iraq) Adnan Dirjal	Resigned	23 May 2012	(Bosnia and Herzegovina) Mehmed Baždarević	23 May 2012
Umm Salal	(France) Gérard Gili	Contract expired	20 June 2012	(France) Bertrand Marchand	27 June 2012
Qatar SC	(Morocco) Saïd Chiba	Contract expired	8 July 2012	(Brazil) Sebastião Lazaroni	9 July 2012
Al Kharaitiyat	(France) Laurent Banide	Contract expired	20 July 2012	(France) Bernard Simondi	23 July 2012
Al-Arabi	(France) Pierre Lechantre	Sacked	30 September 2012	(Egypt) Hassan Shehata	11 October 2012
Lekhwiya	(Algeria) Djamel Belmadi	Resigned	8 October 2012	(Belgium) Eric Gerets	8 October 2012
Al-Sailiya	(Germany) Uli Stielike	Sacked	8 October 2012	(Tunisia) Maher Kanzari	8 October 2012
Al-Gharafa	(Brazil) Paulo Silas	Sacked	27 November 2012	(Tunisia) Habib Sadegh	27 November 2012
Al-Arabi	(Egypt) Hassan Shehata	Sacked	6 December 2012	(Morocco) Abdelaziz Bennij	6 December 2012
Al-Gharafa	(Tunisia) Habib Sadegh	Temp mandate over	20 December 2012	(France) Alain Perrin	20 December 2012
Al-Sailiya	(Tunisia) Maher Kanzari	Resigned	31 January 2013	(Qatar) Abdullah Mubarak	31 January 2013
Al-Gharafa	(France) Alain Perrin	Resigned	21 February 2013	(Tunisia) Habib Sadegh	21 February 2013

=== Foreign players ===
Club	Player 1	Player 2	Player 3	AFC player	Former players
Al-Arabi	(Brazil) Wanderley	(Morocco) Youssouf Hadji	(Serbia) Đorđe Rakić	(Australia) Matthew Spiranovic	(Brazil) Baré (Morocco) Houssine Kharja
Al-Gharafa	(Brazil) Alex	(Brazil) Nenê	(France) Djibril Cissé	(Australia) Harry Kewell	(Australia) Mark Bresciano (Brazil) Afonso Alves (Brazil) Diego Tardelli (Serbia) Đorđe Rakić
Al Kharaitiyat	(Brazil) Domingos	(Democratic Republic of the Congo) Dioko Kaluyituka	(Portugal) Fábio Paim	(Iran) Andranik Teymourian	(Bahrain) Jaycee John Okwunwanne (Burkina Faso) Yahia Kébé
Al-Khor	(Brazil) Júlio César	(Brazil) Madson	(Iraq) Ali Hasan Kamal	(Iraq) Salam Shaker	(Jordan) Hassan Abdel-Fattah (Norway) Pa-Modou Kah
Al-Rayyan	(Brazil) Nilmar	(Brazil) Rodrigo Tabata	(Uruguay) Álvaro Fernández	(South Korea) Cho Yong-hyung	
Al Sadd	(Algeria) Nadir Belhadj	(Iraq) Younis Mahmoud	(Spain) Raúl	(South Korea) Lee Jung-soo	(Senegal) Mamadou Niang
Al-Sailiya	(Brazil) Keninha Goiano	(Brazil) Marcelo Tavares	(Burkina Faso) Moumouni Dagano	(South Korea) Kim Kee-hee	(Ivory Coast) Aruna Dindane (Tunisia) Khaled Korbi
Al-Wakrah	(France) Pierre-Alain Frau	(Morocco) Nabil Daoudi	(Tunisia) Khaled Korbi	(Iraq) Ali Rehema	(Iraq) Younis Mahmoud (Morocco) Anouar Diba (Peru) Reimond Manco
El Jaish	(Algeria) Karim Ziani	(Brazil) Adriano	(Brazil) Anderson Martins	(South Korea) Go Seul-ki	(Oman) Ahmed Hadid Al-Mukhaini
Lekhwiya	(Algeria) Madjid Bougherra	(Senegal) Issiar Dia	(Tunisia) Youssef Msakni	(South Korea) Nam Tae-hee	(Algeria) Mourad Meghni (Brazil) Marcelo Tavares (France) Simon Dia (Mali) Idrissa Coulibaly
Qatar SC	(Brazil) Marcinho	(Ivory Coast) Bakari Koné	(Morocco) Youssef Safri	(Iran) Hadi Aghily	(Iraq) Qusay Munir
Umm Salal	(Brazil) Caboré	(Morocco) Otmane El Assas	(Netherlands) Saïd Boutahar	(Australia) Sasa Ognenovski	(Guinea) Ismaël Bangoura (Senegal) Mamadou Baïla Traoré

== League expansion ==
At the end of the season it was announced that the 2013–14 season would feature 14 teams. The decision to increase the numbers of teams means Al-Sailiya – who finished bottom of the league – would avoid relegation. Meanwhile, Muaither – who lost to Al-Arabi in the play-offs – would join as the 14th team.

The Second Division and the reserve league would also merge to create a stronger second tier.

== League table ==
Pos	Team	Pld	W	D	L	GF	GA	GD	Pts	Qualification or relegation
1	Al Sadd (C)	22	16	3	3	47	23	+24	51	2014 AFC Champions League group stage
2	Lekhwiya	22	14	4	4	42	22	+20	46	2014 AFC Champions League qualifying play-off
3	El Jaish	22	13	1	8	25	23	+2	40	2014 AFC Champions League qualifying play-off
4	Al-Rayyan	22	11	4	7	49	37	+12	37	2014 AFC Champions League group stage
5	Umm Salal	22	9	4	9	30	37	−7	31	
6	Al-Gharafa	22	8	6	8	26	28	−2	30	
7	Al-Khor	22	7	8	7	26	24	+2	29	
8	Qatar SC	22	7	5	10	31	34	−3	26	
9	Al-Wakrah	22	7	5	10	27	31	−4	26	
10	Al Kharaitiyat	22	4	8	10	21	27	−6	20	
11	Al-Arabi	22	3	8	11	25	40	−15	17	Promotion/relegation playoff
12	Al-Sailiya (R)	22	3	4	15	29	52	−23	13	Relegation

Updated to match(es) played on 18 April 2013. Source: RSSSF
Rules for classification: 1) points; 2) goal difference; 3) number of goals scored.
(C) Champions; (R) Relegated

=== Relegation playoff ===
18 April 2013
18:45 (UTC+03:00)

Al-Arabi (Qatar)	2–1	(Qatar) Muaither
Spiranovic 23'; Al Oraimi 82'	Report; Summary	Laitoula 44' (pen.)

Suheim Bin Hamad Stadium, Doha

== Fixtures and results ==
Home \ Away	ARA	GHA	KHA	KHO	RAY	SAD	SAI	WAK	JAI	LEK	QSC	UMM
Al-Arabi		1–1	1–1	1–1	4–4	4–2	3–0	2–1	0–1	1–3	0–2	0–1
Al-Gharafa	1–1		3–1	2–1	2–1	0–1	3–0	3–1	2–0	1–1	2–0	1–1
Al Kharaitiyat	4–0	0–0		0–0	1–2	0–0	0–2	1–1	1–2	0–1	0–2	1–1
Al-Khor	1–0	2–0	1–0		0–0	1–1	1–1	1–0	2–0	1–2	2–2	0–1
Al-Rayyan	0–0	5–1	2–2	1–3		1–4	1–4	0–2	2–1	3–1	2–1	3–1
Al Sadd	2–1	1–0	3–1	2–1	1–4		3–0	2–1	3–1	2–2	2–1	2–0
Al-Sailiya	2–2	4–1	2–3	1–1	3–7	1–4		0–3	1–2	1–2	1–3	2–3
Al-Wakrah	2–1	2–0	1–0	0–1	1–3	1–3	3–2		0–1	0–4	0–0	2–0
El Jaish	3–0	2–0	0–2	3–2	1–0	1–0	2–0	1–1		1–2	0–3	0–2
Lekhwiya	4–1	1–0	0–1	1–1	3–0	0–3	2–0	2–2	0–1		2–0	4–1
Qatar SC	1–1	0–1	2–1	4–2	1–3	2–5	1–1	1–1	0–1	1–2		3–2
Umm Salal	3–1	2–2	1–1	2–1	0–5	0–1	2–1	3–2	0–1	1–3	3–1	

Updated to match(es) played on 26 January 2013. Source: Qatar Football Association
Legend: Blue = home team win; Yellow = draw; Red = away team win.

== Top scorers ==
As of 18 April 2013

Rank	Player	Club	Goals
1	(Qatar) Sebastián Soria	Lekhwiya	19
2	(Brazil) Nilmar	Al-Rayyan	14
3	(Burkina Faso) Moumouni Dagano	Al-Sailiya	13
4	(Brazil) Júlio César	Al-Khor	10
4	(Brazil) Rodrigo Tabata	Al-Rayyan	10
4	(Iraq) Younis Mahmoud	Al-Wakrah / Al Sadd	10
4	(Qatar) Khalfan Ibrahim	Al Sadd	10
5	(Brazil) Diego Tardelli	Al-Gharafa	9
5	(Qatar) Mohammed Razak	Qatar SC	9
5	(Spain) Raúl	Al Sadd	9
