= Sebastián Soria =

Qatari footballer (born 1983)

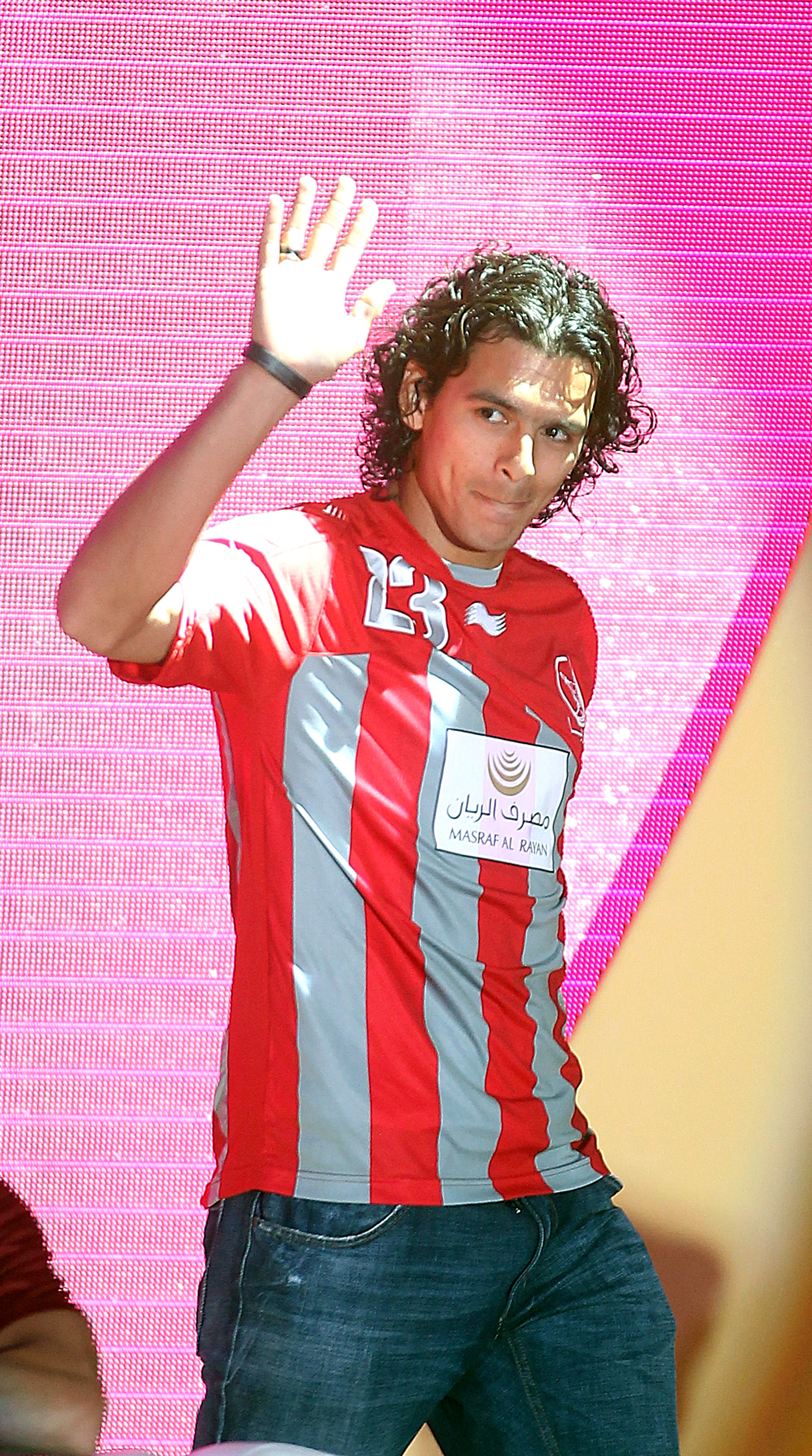
- Soria at the Qatar Stars League launch ceremony in 2012

Personal information
- Full name: Andrés Sebastián Soria Quintana
- Date of birth: 8 November 1983 (age 42)
- Place of birth: Paysandú, Uruguay
- Height: 1.86 m (6 ft 1 in)
- Position: Striker

Team information
- Current team: Qatar
- Number: 23

Youth career
- –2002: Centenario

Senior career*
Years	Team	Apps	(Gls)
2002	Centenario	9	(9)
2002–2004	Liverpool Montevideo	50	(11)
2004–2005	Al-Gharafa	26	(14)
2005–2012	Qatar	152	(104)
2012–2015	Lekhwiya	64	(42)
2015–2020	Al-Rayyan	104	(35)
2020–2021	Al-Arabi	19	(2)
2021–	Qatar	77	(16)

International career^{‡}
2006	Qatar U23	7	(6)
2007–	Qatar	124	(39)
- * Club domestic league appearances and goals as of 14 October 2025 ‡ National team caps and goals as of 14 October 2025

Andrés Sebastián Soria Quintana (Spanish pronunciation: [anˈdɾes seβasˈtjan ˈsoɾja kinˈtana]; Arabic: أندريس سيبستيان سوريا كوينتانا; born 8 November 1983) commonly known as Sebastián Soria, is a professional footballer who plays as a striker for Qatar. Born in Uruguay, he has represented the Qatar national team since 2007. He was shortlisted for the Asian Footballer of the Year award in 2008. He currently holds the record for the fastest goal scored in AFC Champions League history at 9 seconds – a record which was set in 2013 when he was playing for Lekhwiya SC.

== Club career ==
=== Early career ===
As a youngster, Soria had an unsuccessful trial at Uruguayan club Defensor Sporting in Montevideo.

Soria continued playing in the minor leagues, and a new chance soon emerged. In 2001, a cyclist, who had watched Soria playing in the minor leagues and was impressed by his talents, brought him to the attention of a football agent he knew, and Soria was sent to Montevideo to play in Liverpool Montevideo, where he played under coach Julio Ribas. He was sent to the reserve team for a brief while before making it back on the first team. He eventually proved his value and ended up playing the rest of the 2003 season on the first team.

In mid-2004, Soria got an offer from Frenchman Bruno Metsu to play for Al-Gharafa in Qatar. He arrived in Qatar in 2004 and was naturalized in 2006.

=== Al Gharafa ===
Soria joined Al Gharafa in 2004 under the supervision of Bruno Metsu. It was the first time he had played outside of Uruguay. He won the 2004–05 Qatar Stars League with Al Gharafa.

=== Qatar SC ===
Soria transferred to Qatar SC from league winners Al Gharafa in 2005. In 2006, he won the Qatar Stars League's inaugural "Best Player of the Year" award. He won the Qatar Crown Prince Cup with Qatar SC in 2009.

He attracted interest from Europe, with Italian team Udinese and Spanish capital sides Getafe and Atlético Madrid scouting him. However, he chose to extend his contract with Qatar SC in 2010.

When AC Milan came to visit Doha in March 2009, in a farewell match for Jafal Rashed Al-Kuwari, Soria guested for Al Sadd. "They invited me to play for Al Sadd, so of course I said yes. I like to play against the strong defenders," Soria said after his scuffles with Milan defender Philippe Senderos. After being substituted, Soria was swarmed by local fans and patiently signed autographs for approximately 15 minutes.

=== Lekhwiya ===
After transferring to Qatari champions Lekhwiya, Soria had the opportunity to play in the 2013 AFC Champions League. He scored 4 goals in Lekhwiya's first four group stage games, including one of the fastest goals in any Asian competition after 9 seconds against Pakhtakor on 9 April 2013. It is the fastest goal ever scored in Asia's premier continental club competition during the AFC Champions League format.

=== Al Rayyan, Al-Arabi and return to Qatar SC ===
Soria joined Al-Rayyan SC on a one-year deal in 2015, but went on to represent the club for five seasons. He later joined Al-Arabi for the 2020–21 season, before returning to Qatar SC.

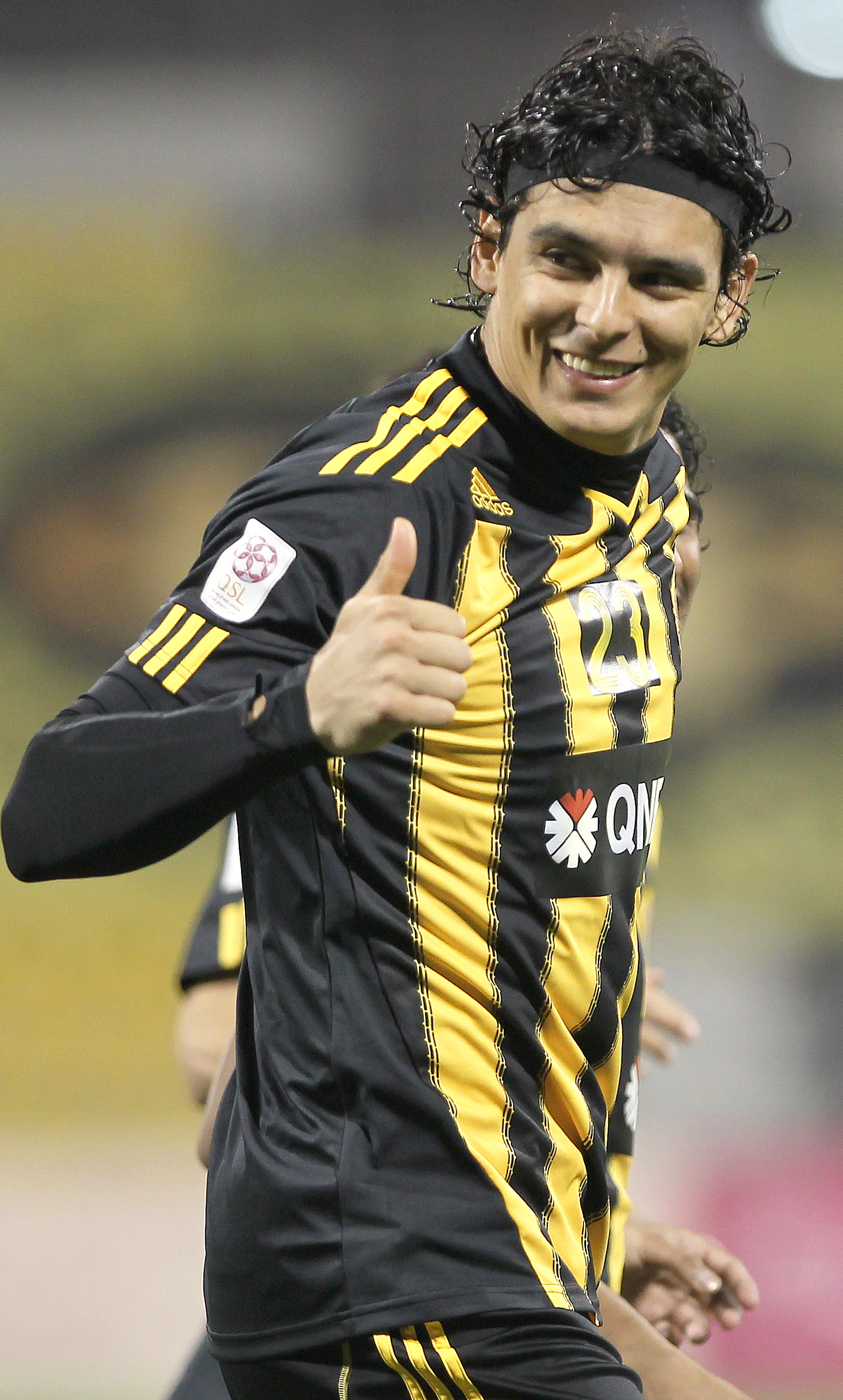
Soria in 2012

== International career ==
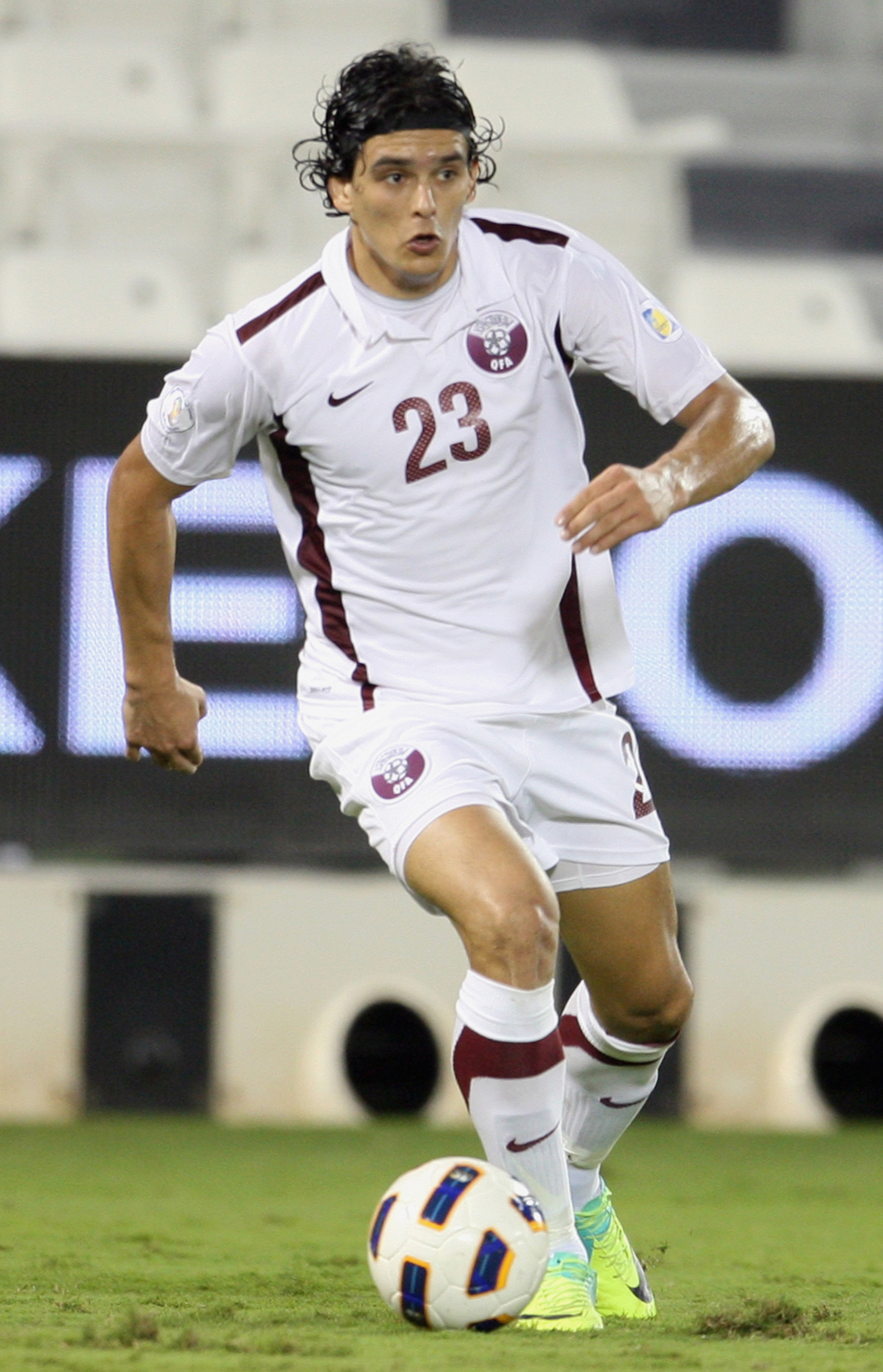
Sebastián Soria is the sixth highest scorer (39) and one of the most capped players (123) of the Qatar national team.

Soria was born and raised in Paysandú, but moved to Qatar early in his footballing career and became a naturalized citizen. He won a gold medal in the 2006 Asian Games for the Qatar U-23 team. The official Qatar SC website has him listed as being born in 1984. In addition, QFA's website lists his actual date of birth as 1983.

Soria saved the Qatari national team by scoring in the last 20 minutes, which helped tie the score. This happened in the AFC 2007 in both their games, one against Japan and the other against Vietnam. He also scored the leading goal against the United Arab Emirates. He is the only Qatari player to score in the 2007 Asian Cup. He scored three goals.

Soria scored a goal against eventual winners Japan in the 2011 Asian Cup quarterfinals, but the home side were silenced after a late goal from Inoha put Japan in the lead to win by a 3–2 margin. However, he was not included in Djamel Belmadi's squad for the 2015 AFC Asian Cup.

In October 2025, eight years after his last appearance for Qatar, coach Julen Lopetegui called up Soria to prepare for the 2026 FIFA World Cup qualification games against Oman and United Arab Emirates. He came in as a late substitute against United Arab Emirates as Qatar won 2–1 and qualified for the 2026 World Cup.

On 12 May 2026, Soria was named to Qatar's 34-man preliminary squad for the 2026 FIFA World Cup. However, he was excluded from the 26-man squad for the tournament.

== Career statistics ==
=== Club ===
As of match played 27 September 2025

Appearances and goals by club, season and competition
Club	Season	League			National cup (Note: Includes Emir Cup)		Continental		Other		Total	
Club	Season	Division	Apps	Goals	Apps	Goals	Apps	Goals	Apps	Goals	Apps	Goals
Centenario	2002	Reg	9	9	–		–		–		9	9
Liverpool	2002	UPD	8	3	–		–		–		8	3
Liverpool	2003	UPD	26	3	7	3	–		–		33	6
Liverpool	2004	UPD	16	5	–		–		–		16	5
Liverpool	Total		50	11	7	3	–		–		57	14
Al-Gharafa	2004–05	QSL	26	14	1	0	0	0	5	3	32	17
Qatar	2005–06	QSL	25	19	2	1	0	0	6	3	33	23
Qatar	2006–07	QSL	21	10	2	3	0	0	0	0	23	13
Qatar	2007–08	QSL	23	18	2	1	0	0	2	0	27	19
Qatar	2008–09	QSL	23	19	2	1	0	0	2	0	27	20
Qatar	2009–10	QSL	20	17	2	1	8	3	4	3	34	24
Qatar	2010–11	QSL	20	12	2	2	0	0	4	4	26	18
Qatar	2011–12	QSL	20	9	2	2	0	0	0	0	22	11
Qatar	Total		152	104	14	11	8	3	18	10	192	128
Al-Duhail	2012–13	QSL	22	19	1	2	7 (Note: Appearances in AFC Champions League)	4	2	0	32	25
Al-Duhail	2013–14	QSL	20	12	0	0	5	2	1	2	26	16
Al-Duhail	2014–15	QSL	22	11	1	0	7	2	3	2	33	15
Al-Duhail	Total		64	42	2	2	19	8	6	4	91	56
Al-Rayyan	2015–16	QSL	25	10	2	1	–		1	0	28	11
Al-Rayyan	2016–17	QSL	22	6	3	0	6	1	2	0	33	7
Al-Rayyan	2017–18	QSL	20	11	0	0	5	1	5 (Note: Appearances in Qatari Stars Cup)	3	30	15
Al-Rayyan	2018–19	QSL	20	6	2	0	6	2	5	5	33	13
Al-Rayyan	2019–20	QSL	17	2	1	0	–		3	1	21	3
Al-Rayyan	Total		104	35	8	1	17	4	16	9	145	49
Al-Arabi	2020–21	QSL	19	2	3	0	–		5 (Note: Four appearances and two goals in Qatari Stars Cup, one appearance in Qatar FA Cup)	2	27	4
Qatar	2021–22	QSL	18	8	2	0	–		3	3	23	11
Qatar	2022–23	QSL	18	4	1	0	–		9	2	28	6
Qatar	2023–24	QSL	18	0	3	0	–		3	0	24	0
Qatar	2024–25	QSL	11	2	0	0	–		6	1	17	3
Qatar	2025–26	QSL	4	0	0	0	–		1	0	5	0
Qatar	Total		69	16	6	0	–		21	6	97	20
Career total			493	231	41	17	44	15	71	34	649	297

=== International ===
As of 14 October 2025.

Competition	Appearances	Goals
Pan Arab Games	1	0
Asian Cup	7	4
Asian Cup Qualifier	7	2
Arabian Gulf Cup	13	0
FIFA World Cup qualifiers	39	10
Friendlies	57 (6)	23 (4)
Total	124	39

- Notes: Values between brackets refer to matches/goals which are not considered full A-internationals.

International goals

Scores and results list Qatar's goal tally first.

#	Date	Venue	Opponent	Score	Result	Competition
–	24 November 2006	Doha, Qatar	China Team XI	1–0	2–0	Unofficial friendly
–	24 November 2006	Doha, Qatar	China Team XI	2–0	2–0	Unofficial friendly
–	19 June 2007	Ascheim	Ghana U-21	3–1	3–1	Unofficial friendly
1.	9 July 2007	Mỹ Đình National Stadium, Hanoi, Vietnam	Japan	1–1	1–1	2007 AFC Asian Cup
2.	12 July 2007	Mỹ Đình National Stadium, Hanoi, Vietnam	Vietnam	1–1	1–1	2007 AFC Asian Cup
3.	16 July 2007	Quân khu 7 Stadium, Ho Chi Minh City, Vietnam	United Arab Emirates	1–0	1–2	2007 AFC Asian Cup
4.	16 October 2007	Thani bin Jassim Stadium, Doha, Qatar	Iraq	2–1	3–2	Friendly
5.	21 October 2007	Sugathadasa Stadium, Colombo, Sri Lanka	Sri Lanka	1–0	1–0	2010 FIFA World Cup qualification
6.	28 October 2007	Jassim Bin Hamad Stadium, Doha, Qatar	Sri Lanka	1–0	5–0	2010 FIFA World Cup qualification
7.	28 October 2007	Jassim Bin Hamad Stadium, Doha, Qatar	Sri Lanka	4–0	5–0	2010 FIFA World Cup qualification
8.	4 March 2008	Jassim Bin Hamad Stadium, Doha, Qatar	Bahrain	1–0	1–2	Friendly
9.	16 March 2008	Jassim Bin Hamad Stadium, Doha, Qatar	Jordan	1–0	2–1	Friendly
10.	23 May 2008	Jassim Bin Hamad Stadium, Doha, Qatar	Kuwait	1–1	1–1	Friendly
11.	27 May 2008	Thani bin Jassim Stadium, Doha, Qatar	Lebanon	1–1	2–1	Friendly
12.	27 May 2008	Thani bin Jassim Stadium, Doha, Qatar	Lebanon	2–1	2–1	Friendly
13.	7 June 2008	Tianjin Olympic Center Stadium, Tianjin, China	China	1–0	1–0	2010 FIFA World Cup qualification
14.	20 August 2008	Khalifa International Stadium, Doha, Qatar	Tajikistan	2–0	5–0	Friendly
15.	10 September 2008	Jassim Bin Hamad Stadium, Doha, Qatar	Bahrain	1–0	1–1	2010 FIFA World Cup qualification
–	30 December 2008	Thani bin Jassim Stadium, Doha, Qatar	Libya	2–1	5–2	Unofficial friendly
16.	21 March 2009	Aleppo International Stadium, Aleppo, Syria	Syria	1–0	2–1	Friendly
17.	21 March 2009	Aleppo International Stadium, Aleppo, Syria	Syria	2–0	2–1	Friendly
18.	8 October 2009	Stadion Kantrida, Rijeka, Croatia	Croatia	2–2	2–3	Friendly
19.	16 December 2010	Khalifa International Stadium, Doha, Qatar	Egypt	1–0	2–1	Friendly
20.	22 December 2010	Khalifa International Stadium, Doha, Qatar	Estonia	1–0	2–0	Friendly
21.	21 January 2011	Thani bin Jassim Stadium, Doha, Qatar	Japan	1–0	2–3	2011 AFC Asian Cup
22.	11 November 2011	Jassim Bin Hamad Stadium, Doha, Qatar	Indonesia	4–0	4–0	2014 FIFA World Cup qualification
23.	3 June 2012	Camille Chamoun Sports City Stadium, Beirut, Lebanon	Lebanon	1–0	1–0	2014 FIFA World Cup qualification
24.	6 September 2012	Audi Sportpark, Ingolstadt, Germany	Tajikistan	1–2	1–2	Friendly
25.	7 November 2012	Jassim Bin Hamad Stadium, Doha, Qatar	Iraq	2–0	2–1	friendly
26.	14 November 2012	Jassim Bin Hamad Stadium, Doha, Qatar	Lebanon	1–0	1–0	2014 FIFA World Cup qualification
27.	9 September 2013	Jassim Bin Hamad Stadium, Doha, Qatar	Lebanon	1–1	1–1	Friendly
28.	13 October 2013	Thani bin Jassim Stadium, Doha, Qatar	Yemen	6–0	6–0	2015 AFC Asian Cup qualification
29.	15 November 2013	Sheikh Khalifa International Stadium, Al Ain, United Arab Emirates	Yemen	1–0	4–1	2015 AFC Asian Cup qualification
30.	6 October 2014	Abdullah bin Khalifa Stadium, Doha, Qatar	Uzbekistan	1–0	3–0	Friendly
31.	24 March 2016	Jassim Bin Hamad Stadium, Doha, Qatar	Hong Kong	2–0	2–0	2018 FIFA World Cup qualification
32.	18 August 2016	Swissporarena, Luzern, Switzerland	Jordan	1–0	3–2	Friendly
33.	18 August 2016	Swissporarena, Luzern, Switzerland	Jordan	2–1	3–2	Friendly
34.	18 August 2016	Swissporarena, Luzern, Switzerland	Jordan	3–2	3–2	Friendly
35.	29 September 2016	Jassim Bin Hamad Stadium, Doha, Qatar	Serbia	1–0	3–0	Friendly
36.	29 September 2016	Jassim Bin Hamad Stadium, Doha, Qatar	Serbia	2–0	3–0	Friendly
37.	29 September 2016	Jassim Bin Hamad Stadium, Doha, Qatar	Serbia	3–0	3–0	Friendly
38.	6 October 2016	Suwon World Cup Stadium, Suwon, South Korea	South Korea	2–1	2–3	2018 FIFA World Cup qualification
39.	17 January 2017	Jassim Bin Hamad Stadium, Doha, Qatar	Moldova	1–0	1–1	Friendly

== Honours ==
=== Club ===
Al Gharafa

- Qatar Stars League: 2004–05
- Sheikh Jassem Cup: 2005

Qatar SC

- Qatar Crown Prince Cup: 2009

Lekhwiya

- Qatar Stars League: 2013–14, 2014–15
- Qatar Cup: 2013, 2015

Al Rayyan

- Qatar Stars League: 2015–16

=== Individual ===
- QFA Player of the Season: 2005–06
- Asian Footballer of the Year nominee: 2008
- Qatar Stars League Top Scorer: 2012–13

== See also ==
- List of men's footballers with 100 or more international caps
