= Akwá =

Angolan footballer (born 1977)

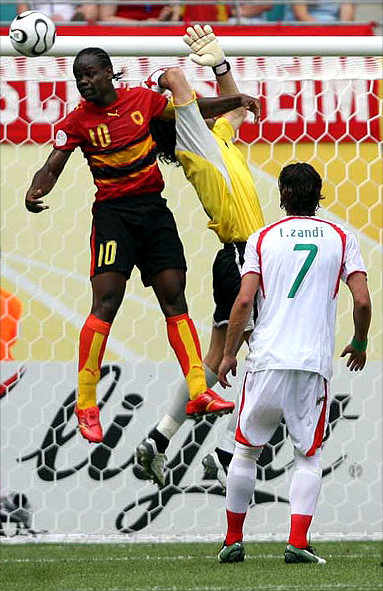
- Akwá at the 2006 FIFA World Cup

Personal information
- Full name: Fabrice Alcebiades Maieco
- Date of birth: 30 May 1977 (age 49)
- Place of birth: Benguela, Angola
- Height: 1.81 m (5 ft 11 in)
- Position: Forward

Senior career*
Years	Team	Apps	(Gls)
1993–1994	Nacional de Benguela	32	(11)
1994–1997	Benfica	5	(0)
1995–1997	→ Alverca (loan)	15	(9)
1997–1998	Académica	19	(1)
1998	Al Shabab FC (Riyadh)		
1998–1999	Al-Wakrah	11	(11)
1999–2000	Al-Gharafa	28	(12)
2000–2006	Qatar	72	(44)
2006–2008	Al-Wakrah	12	(4)
2008–2009	Petro Atlético	19	(12)

International career
1992	Angola national under-17 football team		
1995	Angola national under-20 football team	1	
1995–2006	Angola	78	(38)
- * Club domestic league appearances and goals

Fabrice Alcebiades Maieco (born 30 May 1977), commonly known as Akwá, is an Angolan former professional footballer who played as a forward for the Angola national team. From his international debut in 1995, Akwá represented Angola 78 times, being their all time top goalscorer, and setting a record 39 goals. He played for them in three Africa Cup of Nations and captained the side at the 2006 FIFA World Cup. Akwá has a brother, Rasca, who was a professional football player for Atlético Sport Aviação in Angola.

== Club career ==
Akwá was born in Benguela. He played for three football clubs in Portugal at the start of his career: Benfica, F.C. Alverca, and Académica de Coimbra. He spent four years in Portugal before moving to Qatar where he had the most successful period of his career.

He spent seven years there, playing for three different teams in the Qatar Stars League. He played for Al-Wakrah, Al-Gharafa and Qatar SC. In his time in Qatar he won the Arab Champions League, Qatar Crown Prince Cup and was the league's top scorer in 1999 with 11 goals. After leaving Al-Wakrah for the second time in 2006, he remained unattached until 2007, when he moved to Angolan club Petro Atlético. Akwá remained there for one season before retiring from professional football.

== International career ==
Akwá won his first cap for the Angola national team in 1995 against Mozambique. He accumulated 78 caps in total, scoring 39 goals. One was the winning goal that sent Angola to their first ever World Cup. He played in all three of Angola's games at the 2006 World Cup, but did not score, and they were eliminated from their group. Akwá retired from international football after the tournament.

== Politics ==
Akwa is currently a member of the Angolan legislative assembly. He is interested in major developments in sports in Angola.

== Career statistics ==
=== Club ===
Appearances and goals by club, season and competition
Club	Season	League		Emir of Qatar Cup		Qatar Cup		Sheikh Jassim Cup		Continental		Total	
Club	Season	Apps	Goals	Apps	Goals	Apps	Goals	Apps	Goals	Apps	Goals	Apps	Goals
Al-Wakrah	1998–99	12	11	3	4	2	3	0	0	0	0	17	16
Al-Gharafa	1999–2000	14	7	4	2	3	1	5	7	4 (Note: Appearances in Arab Cup Winners' Cup)	3	30	22
Al-Gharafa	2000–01	14	5	3	0	0	0	1	3	2 (Note: Appearances in Arab Cup Winners' Cup)	2	22	12
Al-Gharafa	Total	28	12	7	2	3	1	6	10	6	5	52	34
Qatar	2001–02	11	8	0	0	0	0	0	0	–		11	8
Qatar	2002–03	18	12	3	0	2	1	0	0	2 (Note: Appearances in GCC Champions League)	1	25	14
Qatar	2003–04	18	13	2	4	3	1	–		–		23	18
Qatar	2004–05	25	11	1	1	1	0	2	0	–		29	12
Qatar	Total	72	44	6	5	6	2	2	0	2	1	88	52
Al-Wakrah	2005–06	12	4	0	0	0	0	0	0	0	0	12	4
Career total		124	71	16	11	11	6	8	10	8	6	176	104

=== International ===
Appearances and goals by national team and year
National team	Year	Apps	Goals
Angola	1995	6	3
Angola	1996	3	1
Angola	1997	8	4
Angola	1998	7	2
Angola	1999	2	3
Angola	2000	9	5
Angola	2001	11	6
Angola	2002	3	1
Angola	2003	6	4
Angola	2004	3	2
Angola	2005	8	2
Angola	2006	12	5
Total		78	38

Scores and results list Angola's goal tally first, score column indicates score after each Akwá goal.

List of international goals scored by Akwá
No.	Date	Venue	Opponent	Score	Result	Competition
1	23 April 1995	Estádio da Cidadela, Luanda, Angola	Guinea	1–0	3–0	1996 Africa Cup of Nations qualification
2	23 April 1995	Estádio da Cidadela, Luanda, Angola	Guinea	3–0	3–0	1996 Africa Cup of Nations qualification
3	4 June 1995	Estádio da Cidadela, Luanda, Angola	Mali	1–0	1–0	1996 Africa Cup of Nations qualification
4	10 November 1996	Estádio da Cidadela, Luanda, Angola	Zimbabwe	1–0	2–1	1998 FIFA World Cup qualification
5	6 April 1997	Estádio da Cidadela, Luanda, Angola	Togo	2–1	3–1	1998 FIFA World Cup qualification
6	8 June 1997	Estádio da Cidadela, Luanda, Angola	Cameroon	1–1	1–1	1998 FIFA World Cup qualification
7	22 June 1997	Estádio da Cidadela, Luanda, Angola	Ghana	1–0	1–0	1998 Africa Cup of Nations qualification
8	27 July 1997	Estádio da Cidadela, Luanda, Angola	Zimbabwe	2–0	2–1	1998 Africa Cup of Nations qualification
9	16 August 1998	Estádio da Cidadela, Luanda, Angola	Benin	1–0	2–0	2000 Africa Cup of Nations qualification
10	16 August 1998	Estádio da Cidadela, Luanda, Angola	Benin	2–0	2–0	2000 Africa Cup of Nations qualification
11	24 January 1999	Estádio da Cidadela, Luanda, Angola	Gabon	1–0	3–1	2000 Africa Cup of Nations qualification
12	24 January 1999	Estádio da Cidadela, Luanda, Angola	Gabon	2–0	3–1	2000 Africa Cup of Nations qualification
13	24 January 1999	Estádio da Cidadela, Luanda, Angola	Gabon	3–1	3–1	2000 Africa Cup of Nations qualification
14	19 June 2000	Estádio da Cidadela, Luanda, Angola	Zambia	1–1	2–1	2002 FIFA World Cup qualification
15	19 June 2000	Estádio da Cidadela, Luanda, Angola	Zambia	2–0	2–1	2002 FIFA World Cup qualification
16	6 July 2000	Praia, Cape Verde	Cape Verde		1–1	Friendly
17	16 July 2000	Estádio da Cidadela, Luanda, Angola	Equatorial Guinea	2–0	4–1	2002 Africa Cup of Nations qualification
18	23 July 2000	Setsoto Stadium, Maseru, Lesotho	Lesotho	2–0	2–0	2000 COSAFA Cup
19	24 January 2001	Estádio da Cidadela, Luanda, Angola	Libya	3–1	3–1	2002 FIFA World Cup qualification
20	11 March 2001	Stade de Kégué, Lomé, Togo	Togo	1–1	1–1	2002 FIFA World Cup qualification
21	25 March 2001	Estádio da Cidadela, Luanda, Angola	Burkina Faso	2–0	2–0	2002 Africa Cup of Nations qualification
22	6 May 2001	Estádio da Cidadela, Luanda, Angola	Cameroon	1–0	2–0	2002 FIFA World Cup qualification
23	29 July 2001	Estádio da Cidadela, Luanda, Angola	Togo	1–0	1–1	2002 FIFA World Cup qualification
24	18 August 2001	Independence Stadium, Lusaka, Zambia	Zambia	1–0	1–1 (4–2 pen.)	2001 COSAFA Cup
25	25 June 2002	Estádio do Maxaquene, Maputo, Mozambique	Mozambique	1–0	1–1	Friendly
26	21 June 2003	Samuel Ogbemudia Stadium, Benin City, Nigeria	Nigeria	2–0	2–2	2004 Africa Cup of Nations qualification
27	6 July 2003	Estádio da Cidadela, Luanda, Angola	Malawi	2–0	5–1	2004 Africa Cup of Nations qualification
28	20 September 2003	Independence Stadium, Windhoek, Namibia	Namibia	3–1	3–1	Friendly
29	16 November 2003	Estádio da Cidadela, Luanda, Angola	Chad	1–0	2–0	2006 FIFA World Cup qualification
30	20 June 2004	Estádio da Cidadela, Luanda, Angola	Nigeria	1–0	1–0	2006 FIFA World Cup qualification
31	3 July 2004	Stade Omar Bongo, Libreville, Gabon	Gabon	1–0	2–2	2006 FIFA World Cup qualification
32	5 June 2005	Estádio da Cidadela, Luanda, Angola	Algeria	2–0	2–1	2006 FIFA World Cup qualification
33	8 October 2005	Amahoro Stadium, Kigali, Rwanda	Rwanda	1–0	1–0	2006 FIFA World Cup qualification
34	17 January 2006	Prince Moulay Abdellah Stadium, Rabat, Morocco	Morocco	1–2	2–2	Friendly
35	29 April 2006	Setsoto Stadium, Maseru, Lesotho	Mauritius	1–1	5–1	2006 COSAFA Cup
36	29 April 2006	Setsoto Stadium, Maseru, Lesotho	Mauritius	2–1	5–1	2006 COSAFA Cup
37	29 April 2006	Setsoto Stadium, Maseru, Lesotho	Mauritius	3–1	5–1	2006 COSAFA Cup
38	2 June 2006	Fortuna Sittard Stadion, Sittard, Netherlands	Turkey	1–0	2–3	Friendly

== Honours ==
Al-Gharafa

- Qatar Crown Prince Cup: 1999, 2000
- Cheikh Qassim Cup: 1999

Qatar SC

- Qatar Crown Prince Cup: 2002, 2004

Angola

- COSAFA Cup: 1999, 2001, 2004

Individual

- Qatar Stars League: Top scorer 1998–99
- Best stranger player in Qatar: 1999, 2004, 2005
- Angolan Player Of The Year: 2006
