= 2014–15 Qatar Stars League =

51st season of top-tier football league in Qatar

Qatar Stars League
- Season: 2014–15
- Champions: Lekhwiya (4th title)
- Relegated: Al Shahaniya; Al-Shamal
- AFC Champions League: Lekhwiya; Al Sadd; El Jaish
- Matches: 182
- Goals: 613 (3.37 per match)
- Top goalscorer: (Democratic Republic of the Congo) Dioko Kaluyituka (25 goals)
- Biggest home win: Al-Gharafa 7–0 Al-Shamal (21 March 2015)
- Biggest away win: Al-Wakrah 0–7 Qatar SC (29 November 2014)
- Highest scoring: Al Kharaitiyat 4–4 Al-Arabi (28 February 2015)
- Longest winning run: Lekhwiya (5 matches)
- Longest unbeaten run: Al Sadd (13 matches)
- Longest winless run: Al-Shamal (17 matches)
- Longest losing run: Al-Wakrah (5 matches)
- All statistics correct as of 16 April 2015.

The 2014–15 Qatari League, also known as Qatari Stars League, was the 42nd edition of top-level football championship in Qatar. The season started on 21 August 2014. Lekhwiya, the defending champions, won their fourth league title with one matchday remaining by winning against Al Ahli on 12 April 2015.

== Teams ==
Al-Shamal were promoted as champions from the 2nd Division. They last played in the top flight in 2009–10. They were joined by 2nd Division runners up Al Shahaniya who entered the top flight for the first time in their history. Relegated teams were Muaither who lasted one season in the top flight and former power-house outfit Al-Rayyan.

=== Stadia and locations ===
Locations of teams in the 2014–15 Qatari League

Club	City/Town	Stadium	Capacity	Head coach
Al Ahli	Doha	Grand Hamad Stadium	13,000	(Croatia) Zlatko Kranjčar
Al-Arabi	Doha	Grand Hamad Stadium	13,000	(Uruguay) José Daniel Carreño
Al-Gharafa	Al Gharrafa	Thani bin Jassim Stadium	25,000	(Tunisia) Habib Sadegh
Al Kharaitiyat	Al Kharaitiyat	Al-Khor SC Stadium	13,000	(Bosnia and Herzegovina) Amar Osim
Al-Khor	Al Khor	Al-Khor SC Stadium	13,000	(Romania) László Bölöni
Al Sadd	Doha	Jassim bin Hamad Stadium	14,000	(Morocco) Hussein Ammouta
Al-Sailiya	Al Sailiya	Jassim bin Hamad Stadium	14,000	(Tunisia) Sami Trabelsi
Al Shahaniya	Al-Shahaniya	Thani bin Jassim Stadium	25,000	(Croatia) Luka Bonačić
Al-Shamal	Madinat ash Shamal	Al-Shamal SC Stadium	5,000	(Serbia) Dragan Cvetković
Al-Wakrah	Al Wakrah	Saoud bin Abdulrahman Stadium	12,000	(Serbia) Goran Tufegdžić
El Jaish	Duhail	Abdullah bin Khalifa Stadium	15,000	(France) Sabri Lamouchi
Lekhwiya	Doha	Abdullah bin Khalifa Stadium	15,000	(Denmark) Michael Laudrup
Qatar SC	Doha	Suheim bin Hamad Stadium	13,000	(Iraq) Radhi Shenaishil
Umm Salal	Umm Salal	Suheim bin Hamad Stadium	13,000	(Turkey) Bülent Uygun

=== Kit manufacturer and sponsors ===
Teams	Kit manufacturer	Sponsors
Al Ahli	Jako	Regency Group
Al-Arabi	Adidas	
Al-Gharafa	BURRDA	
Al Kharaitiyat	BURRDA	ORYX GTL
Al-Khor	Adidas	Al Sultan Beach Resort
Al Sadd	BURRDA	Vodafone
Al-Sailiya	Adidas	QIB
Al Shahaniya	Macron	
Al-Shamal	Hummel	
Al-Wakrah	Jako	Alijarah Holding
El Jaish	Nike	NAPT
Lekhwiya	BURRDA	Masraf Al Rayan
Qatar SC	Hummel	QNB
Umm Salal	Nike	MSC Qatar

=== Stadium changes ===
- El Jaish have moved out of the Suheim bin Hamad Stadium to join Lekhwiya at the Abdullah bin Khalifa Stadium.
- Al Ahli have moved out of the Hamad bin Khalifa Stadium to join Al-Arabi at the Grand Hamad Stadium.
- Al-Sailiya have moved out of the Ahmad bin Ali Stadium to join Al Sadd at the Jassim bin Hamad Stadium.
- Umm Salal have moved out of the Grand Hamad Stadium to join Qatar SC at the Suheim bin Hamad Stadium.

=== Managerial changes ===
Team	Outgoing manager	Manner of departure	Date of vacancy	Position in table	Incoming manager	Date of appointment
Al-Arabi	(Brazil) Paulo César Carpegiani	Mutual contest	11 April 2014	Pre-season	(Romania) Dan Petrescu	11 April 2014
Al-Gharafa	(Uruguay) Diego Aguirre	Resigned	5 June 2014	Pre-season	(Brazil) Marcos Paquetá	7 June 2014
Qatar SC	(Brazil) Sebastião Lazaroni	Mutual consent	1 July 2014	Pre-season	(Czech Republic) Ivan Hašek	1 July 2014
Lekhwiya	(Belgium) Eric Gerets	Mutual consent	1 July 2014	Pre-season	(Denmark) Michael Laudrup	1 July 2014
Qatar SC	(Czech Republic) Ivan Hašek	Sacked	11 September 2014	9th	(Iraq) Radhi Shenaishil	11 September 2014
Al Shahaniya	(Spain) Miguel Ángel Lotina	Resigned	22 September 2014	13th	(Croatia) Luka Bonačić	21 November 2014
Al-Wakrah	(Tunisia) Maher Kanzari	Sacked	28 October 2014	12th	(Algeria) Noureddine Zekri	28 October 2014
Al-Arabi	(Romania) Dan Petrescu	Sacked	1 December 2014	8th	(Uruguay) José Daniel Carreño	1 December 2014
El Jaish	(Tunisia) Nabil Maâloul	Signed by Kuwait	13 December 2014	4th	(France) Sabri Lamouchi	27 December 2014
Al Kharaitiyat	(France) Bertrand Marchand	Sacked	15 December 2014	12th	(Bosnia and Herzegovina) Amar Osim	27 December 2014
Al Ahli	(Czech Republic) Milan Máčala	Sacked	7 February 2015	7th	(Croatia) Zlatko Kranjčar	7 February 2015
Al-Wakrah	(Algeria) Noureddine Zekri	Sacked	20 February 2015	12th	(Serbia) Goran Tufegdžić	23 February 2015
Al-Shamal	(Netherlands) Silvio Diliberto	Sacked		14th	(Serbia) Dragan Cvetković	
Al-Gharafa	(Brazil) Marcos Paquetá	Sacked		7th	(Tunisia) Habib Sadegh	15 April 2015

=== Foreign players ===
Club	Player 1	Player 2	Player 3	AFC Player	Former players
Al Ahli	(Democratic Republic of the Congo) Dioko Kaluyituka	(Democratic Republic of the Congo) Patou Kabangu	(Iran) Jalal Hosseini	(Iran) Mojtaba Jabbari	
Al-Arabi	(Brazil) Junior Dutra	(Brazil) Paulinho	(Romania) Mirel Rădoi	(Iran) Ashkan Dejagah	(Morocco) Anouar Kali (Nigeria) Imoh Ezekiel (Spain) Pablo Hernández
Al-Gharafa	(Brazil) Cícero	(Costa Rica) Christian Bolaños	(Romania) Claudiu Keșerü	(Australia) Mark Bresciano	(Argentina) Lisandro López (Brazil) Nenê (Venezuela) Miku
Al Kharaitiyat	(Brazil) Domingos	(Burkina Faso) Yahia Kébé	(Senegal) Issiar Dia	(Jordan) Hassan Abdel-Fattah	(Democratic Republic of the Congo) Yves Diba Ilunga
Al-Khor	(Brazil) Júlio César	(Brazil) Madson	(Brazil) Marco Antônio	(Jordan) Mohammad Mustafa	(Brazil) Leandro Euzébio (Brazil) William
Al Sadd	(Algeria) Nadir Belhadj	(Brazil) Grafite	(Brazil) Muriqui	(South Korea) Lee Jung-soo	(Brazil) Rodrigo Tabata
Al-Sailiya	(Bahrain) Faouzi Aaish	(Democratic Republic of the Congo) Yves Diba Ilunga	(Tunisia) Issam Jemâa	(Saudi Arabia) Ali Al-Khaibari	(Portugal) Ricardo Costa (South Korea) Sin Jin-ho
Al Shahaniya	(Argentina) Luciano Vázquez	(Iran) Masoud Shojaei	(Spain) Álvaro Mejía	(Iran) Mehrdad Pooladi	(Brazil) Orestes (Brazil) Vinicius Pedroso
Al-Shamal	(Burkina Faso) Moumouni Dagano	(Morocco) Salaheddine Chihab	(Netherlands) Saïd Boutahar	(Jordan) Mohammad Al-Dmeiri	(South Korea) Cho Yong-hyung (Tunisia) Maher Haddad
Al-Wakrah	(Argentina) Sebastián Sáez	(Morocco) Ismail Belmaalem	(Morocco) Mohsine Moutouali	(Iran) Reza Ghoochannejhad	(Morocco) Younès Hawassi (South Korea) Kwak Hee-ju
El Jaish	(Brazil) Anderson Martins	(Brazil) Lucas Mendes	(Brazil) Romarinho	(South Korea) Lee Keun-ho	
Lekhwiya	(Slovakia) Vladimír Weiss	(Spain) Chico Flores	(Tunisia) Youssef Msakni	(South Korea) Nam Tae-hee	
Qatar SC	(Algeria) Rafik Halliche	(South Korea) Cho Young-cheol	(Tunisia) Hamdi Harbaoui	(South Korea) Han Kook-young	
Umm Salal	(Egypt) Ahmed Fathy	(France) Jérémie Aliadière	(Turkey) Tuncay Şanlı	(Iran) Pejman Montazeri	

== League table ==
Pos	Team	Pld	W	D	L	GF	GA	GD	Pts	Qualification or relegation
1	Lekhwiya (C)	26	19	5	2	59	25	+34	62	2016 AFC Champions League group stage
2	Al Sadd	26	17	6	3	68	35	+33	57	2016 AFC Champions League second qualifying round (Note: Since Al Sadd, winners of 2015 Emir of Qatar Cup, have already qualified for the 2016 AFC Champions League via QSL, third-placed El Jaish earned a spot in the same tournament.)
3	El Jaish	26	15	2	9	54	33	+21	47	2016 AFC Champions League second qualifying round
4	Qatar SC	26	14	4	8	51	40	+11	46	
5	Al Ahli	26	11	5	10	48	40	+8	38	2016 GCC Champions League
6	Umm Salal	26	10	7	9	43	37	+6	37	
7	Al-Gharafa	26	11	3	12	48	54	−6	36	
8	Al-Arabi	26	9	8	9	43	38	+5	35	2016 GCC Champions League
9	Al Kharaitiyat	26	8	10	8	37	38	−1	34	
10	Al-Khor	26	7	9	10	38	48	−10	30	
11	Al-Sailiya	26	8	5	13	40	54	−14	29	
12	Al-Wakrah	26	6	5	15	34	52	−18	23	
13	Al Shahaniya (R)	26	5	5	16	26	57	−31	20	Relegation to 2015–16 Qatari Second Division
14	Al-Shamal (R)	26	1	8	17	24	62	−38	11	Relegation to 2015–16 Qatari Second Division

Updated to match(es) played on 16 April 2015. Source: RSSSF
Rules for classification: 1) points; 2) goal difference; 3) number of goals scored.
(C) Champions; (R) Relegated

== Season statistics ==
As of 16 April 2015

=== Top scorers ===
Position	Player	Club	Goals
1	(Democratic Republic of the Congo) Dioko Kaluyituka	Al Ahli	25
2	(Tunisia) Hamdi Harbaoui	Qatar SC	21
3	(Brazil) Júlio Cesar	Al-Khor	16
3	(Brazil) Romarinho	El Jaish	16
3	(Jordan) Hassan Abdel-Fattah	Al Kharaitiyat	16
6	(Argentina) Sebastián Sáez	Al-Wakrah	11
6	(Brazil) Paulinho	Al-Arabi	11
6	(Qatar) Hassan Al-Haydos	Al Sadd	11
6	(Qatar) Khalfan Ibrahim	Al Sadd	11
6	(Qatar) Meshal Abdullah	Al Ahli	11
6	(Qatar) Sebastián Soria	Lekhwiya	11
6	(Tunisia) Issam Jemâa	Al-Sailiya	11
6	(Turkey) Tuncay Şanlı	Umm Salal	11

== Awards ==
=== Monthly awards ===
Month	Manager of the Month		Player of the Month		Reference
Month	Manager	Club	Player	Club	Reference
August	(Denmark) Michael Laudrup	Lekhwiya	(Iran) Mojtaba Jabbari	Al Ahli	
September	(Iraq) Radhi Shenaishil	Qatar SC	(Tunisia) Hamdi Harbaoui	Qatar SC	
October	(Morocco) Hussein Ammouta	Al Sadd	(Brazil) Rodrigo Tabata	Al Sadd	
November	(Turkey) Bülent Uygun	Umm Salal	(Democratic Republic of the Congo) Dioko Kaluyituka	Al Ahli	
December	(Denmark) Michael Laudrup	Lekhwiya	(Qatar) Hassan Al-Haydos	Al Sadd	
February	(Bosnia and Herzegovina) Amar Osim	Al Kharaitiyat	(Jordan) Hassan Abdel-Fattah	Al Kharaitiyat	
