= Keninha Goiano =

Brazilian footballer

Personal information
- Full name: Kenedy Silva Reis
- Date of birth: 25 November 1985 (age 40)
- Place of birth: Inhumas, Brazil
- Height: 1.74 m (5 ft 9 in)
- Position: Attacking midfielder

Senior career*
Years	Team	Apps	(Gls)
2006–2009	Nerópolis		
2007	→ Inhumas (loan)		
2007–2008	→ Grêmio Anápolis (loan)		
2008	→ Anápolis (loan)		
2009	→ Rio Preto (loan)		
2009	→ Santa Helena (loan)		
2009	→ Vila Nova (loan)		
2009	→ Ituiutaba (loan)		
2009	Rio Verde		
2010	Santa Helena		
2010–2011	Atlético Goianiense	10	(0)
2011	Goiânia		
2011	Anapolina		
2012	Pelotas		
2012	Rio Verde		
2012	Guaratinguetá		
2013	Al-Sailiya Sports Club		
- * Club domestic league appearances and goals as of July 16, 2012

Kenedy Silva Reis (born 25 November 1985), commonly known as Keninha Goiano or Keninha, is a Brazilian former professional footballer who played as an attacking midfielder.

== Career ==
Keninha Goiano went through several small clubs in Goiás, São Paulo and other states to reach the Atlético Goianiense. In January 2013, he signed a six-month contract with Qatari club Al-Sailiya.
