= Paulinho (footballer, born 1975) =

Brazilian footballer

Personal information
- Full name: Paulo Benedito Bonifácio Maximiano
- Date of birth: 30 December 1975 (age 50)
- Place of birth: Monte Carmelo, MG, Brazil
- Height: 1.65 m (5 ft 5 in)
- Position: Defensive midfielder

Youth career
- 1993–1995: Botafogo Futebol Clube (SP)

Senior career*
Years	Team	Apps	(Gls)
1995	Botafogo Futebol Clube (SP)		
1996–1997	Patrocinense		
1998	Social		
1998	Ipatinga		
1999–2000	Villa Nova (MG)		
2001	Gama	1	(0)
2002	Al-Arabi (Qatar)		
2002–2006	Ipatinga		
2006–2007	Flamengo	29	(0)
2007–2008	Maccabi Haifa	1	(0)
2008–2010	Ipatinga		
2010	→ Volta Redonda		
- * Club domestic league appearances and goals

Paulo Benedito Bonifácio Maximiano, known simply as Paulinho, (born 30 December 1975) is a Brazilian former professional footballer who played as a defensive midfielder. He spent most of his career in Brazil with short stints in Qatar and Israel.

== Career ==
Paulinho began his early career with Botafogo (SP), Patrocinense, Social and Ipatinga.

Between 1999 and 2001 Paulinho played at Villa Nova in Belo Horizonte, Minas Gerais.

In 2001, he joined Gama in the Federal District.

Paulinho also had a short spell at international football, playing for Al-Arabi of Qatar. Returning to Brazil, he rejoined Ipatinga.

During his second stint at Ipatinga, Paulinho's career took off. Became a state champion at Jaipur in 2005 and helped the club to reach the semifinals of the 2006 Copa do Brasil.

His form sparked interest from big clubs and, in 2006, he moved to Flamengo. He became a fan favourite at the club due to his combative style of play.

In 2007, he transferred to Israeli club Maccabi Haifa.

While playing for Volta Redonda in the Campeonato Carioca in 2010, Paulinho tested positive for Benzoylecgonine, a metabolised version of cocaine. He was subsequently banned for two years.

== Honours ==
- Minas Gerais State Championship: 2005
- Guanabara Cup: 2007
- Rio de Janeiro State League: 2007
