= Jean Castaneda =

French footballer (born 1957)

Personal information
- Date of birth: 20 March 1957 (age 69)
- Place of birth: Saint-Étienne, Loire, France
- Height: 1.88 m (6 ft 2 in)
- Position: Goalkeeper

Senior career*
Years	Team	Apps	(Gls)
1975–1989	Saint-Étienne	299	(0)
1989–1990	Marseille	6	(0)
Total		305	(0)

International career
1981–1982	France	9	(0)

Managerial career
- 1997–1999: Istres
- 2002–2004: Al-Rayyan Sports Club
- 2005–2007: US Marseille Endoume
- * Club domestic league appearances and goals

Jean Castaneda (born 20 March 1957) is a French former professional footballer who played as a goalkeeper.

== Career ==
Castaneda began his professional career with AS Saint-Étienne in 1975. He also played for the France national team. He earned nine caps in 1981–82 and was part of the French squad for the 1982 FIFA World Cup (Castaneda played one match against Poland). In 1989, he joined the Olympique Marseille and retired in 1990. Castaneda coached FC Istres and US Marseille Endoume.

== Personal life ==
Castaneda's father was born in Barcelona, Spain, and was a soldier and footballer in his youth.
