= Habib Sadegh =

Tunisian football manager

Personal information
- Full name: Habib Sadegh
- Place of birth: Tunisia

Team information
- Current team: Al-Gharafa

Managerial career
- Years: Team
- 2012: Al-Gharafa
- 2013: Al-Gharafa
- 2014: Al-Gharafa
- 2015–: Al-Gharafa

Habib Sadegh is a Tunisian football manager. He managed Al-Gharafa in the Qatar Stars League on 4 occasions.
