= João Francisco =

Brazilian football manager

Personal information
- Full name: João Francisco Nóbrega da Silva
- Date of birth: January 28, 1947 (age 79)
- Place of birth: Mangaratiba, Brazil

Managerial career
- Years: Team
- 1974: América Mineiro
- 1976–1977: Vila Nova
- 1978: Cruzeiro
- 1979: Caldense
- 1979–1980: Volta Redonda
- 1981: Inter de Limeira
- 1981–1983: Bangu
- 1983: Madureira
- 1983–1984: Al-Arabi
- 1984–1985: Cruzeiro
- 1985: Villa Nova
- 1985: Joinville
- 1985–1986: Qatar U-20
- 1986–1988: Al-Ain
- 1988: Goiás
- 1988: Bangu
- 1989: Vitória
- 1989: Cruzeiro
- 1989: América Mineiro
- 1989–1990: Sport
- 1990: Valério
- 1990: Criciúma
- 1990: Paysandu
- 1991: Jataiense
- 1992: URT
- 1992–1993: Vitória
- 1993: Bahia
- 1994: Fluminense de Feira
- 1995: Caldense
- 1996: Bahia
- 1997: Vila Nova
- 1997: Ettifaq
- 1998: Remo
- 1999: Al-Shabab
- 2000: Uberlândia
- 2001: Nacional de Manaus
- 2002: Ituano
- 2002: Remo
- 2003: Villa Nova
- 2004: Fluminense de Feira
- 2005: Al-Kharitiyath
- 2008: Fluminense de Feira
- 2009: Barra do Garças
- 2009–2010: URT
- 2011: Anápolis

João Francisco Nóbrega da Silva (born January 28, 1947, in Mangaratiba) is a former Brazilian football manager.

== Honors ==
Vila Nova

- Campeonato Goiano:: 1977

Cruzeiro

- Campeonato Mineiro: 1984

Al-Arabi

- Sheikh Jassim Cup: 1982–83

Joinville

- Campeonato Catarinense: 1985

Vitória

- Campeonato Baiano: 1989, 1992

Criciúma

- Campeonato Catarinense: 1990

Bahia

- Campeonato Baiano:: 1993

Al-Shabab

- Crown Prince Cup: 1998–99
