= 2015 Emir of Qatar Cup =

Tournament details
- Country: Qatar
- Dates: April – 23 May
- Teams: 18

Final positions
- Champions: Al-Sadd
- Runners-up: El Jaish

The 2015 Emir of Qatar Cup was the 43rd edition of a men's football tournament in Qatar. It was played by the 1st and 2nd level divisions of the Qatari football league structure.

The competition features all teams from the 2014–15 Qatar Stars League and the top four sides from the Qatargas League. Four venues are to be used – Al Sadd Stadium, Al Arabi Stadium, Qatar SC Stadium and Khalifa Stadium.

The Emir of Qatar Cup winner is guaranteed a place in the 2016 AFC Champions League.

== Round one ==
Al Rayyan 5-0 Al Markhiya

Al Mesaimeer 2-1 Al Mu'aidar

== Round two ==
Al Khor 4-0 Al Mesaimeer

Al Kharitiyath 3-3 (P) Al Shahaniya

Al Rayyan 2-1 Al Wakrah

Al Sailiya 2-0 Al Shamal

== Round three ==
Al Gharafa 2-2 (P) Al Shahaniya

Al Arabi 1-4 Al Khor

Al Ahli 0-0 (P) Al Rayyan

Umm Salal 3-0 Al Sailiya

== Quarter finals ==
Al Shahaniya 1-4 Qatar SC

Al Rayyan 1-5 El Jaish

Al Khor 1-3 Al Sadd

Umm Salal 0-0 (P) Lekhwiya

== Semi finals ==
Qatar SC 1-2 El Jaish

Al Sadd 2-0 Lekhwiya

== Final ==
23 may 2015

El Jaish 1-2 Al Sadd
