= Hussein Ammouta =

Moroccan footballer and coach (born 1969)

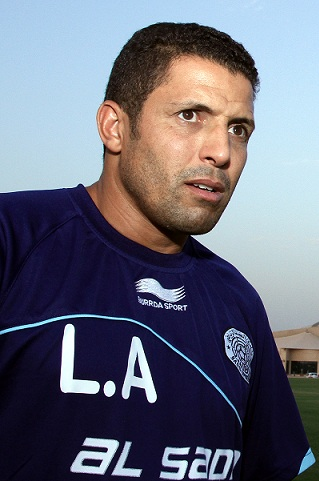
- Ammouta with Al Sadd SC in 2012

Personal information
- Date of birth: 24 October 1969 (age 57)
- Place of birth: Khemisset, Morocco
- Position: Midfielder

Team information
- Current team: Al Ahly (head coach)

Senior career*
Years	Team	Apps	(Gls)
1988–1990	IZ Khemisset		
1990–1996	Fath Union Sport		
1996–1997	Al Riyadh		
1997–2001	Al Sadd SC		
2001–2002	Sharjah		
2002	Qatar SC		

International career
1991–1994	Morocco	5	(1)

Managerial career
- 2003: IZ Khemisset B
- 2005–2008: IZ Khemisset
- 2008–2011: Fath Union Sport
- 2011–2012: Al Sadd (Technical director)
- 2012–2015: Al Sadd
- 2017–2018: Wydad AC
- 2020–2022: Morocco A'
- 2022–2023: Wydad AC
- 2023: AS FAR (General supervisor)
- 2023–2024: Jordan
- 2024–2025: Al Jazira
- 2026–: Al Ahly
Medal record
Men's football
Representing Morocco (as manager)
African Nations Championship
Winner	2020 Cameroon
Representing Jordan (as manager)
AFC Asian Cup
Runner-up	2023 Qatar
- * Club domestic league appearances and goals

Hussein Ammouta (Arabic: الحسين عموتة; born 24 October 1969), also spelled as Houcine Ammouta and Lhoussine Ammouta, is a Moroccan professional football manager and former player, and current manager of Egyptian club Al Ahly.

As a former midfielder, Ammouta spent his entire playing career in the Middle East and Africa, namely IZ Khemisset, Fath Union Sport, Al-Riyadh, Al Sadd, Sharjah and Qatar SC. As a Moroccan international, he was capped on 5 occasions, he also competed in the 1992 Summer Olympics with his nation.

As a manager, Ammouta began his career coaching a local team named Zemmouris. He went on to spend his next 15 years coaching different clubs, most notably Wydad AC, winning the CAF Champions League.

In 2020, Ammouta was named as the new manager of the Morocco A' national football team. He led the team to victory in the 2020 African Nations Championship.

On 27 June 2023, Ammouta was appointed as the Jordan national team coach. Under the leadership of Hussein Ammouta, the Jordanian national team reached the 2023 AFC Asian Cup final for the first time in their history.

== Playing career ==
His career began in his hometown club of Ittihad Khemisset in 1988. He joined Al Sadd SC in 1997, helping them win the Emir Cup and the Crown Prince Cup in his second season at Jassim Bin Hamad Stadium. He was the league top goalscorer that season.

He had spells in United Arab Emirates with Al Sharjah and in Saudi Arabia with Al Riyadh.

== Managerial career ==
He began his managerial career as a player-coach at Ittihad Zemmouri Khemisset in 2003.

In 2007, he returned to his first club, Ittihad Khemisset, winning the league. He left in the 2007–08 season, and from 2008 to 2011, he took over the reins of a well-known club, FUS de Rabat. After he left, he joined Al Sadd as the technical director, before being named as a replacement for head coach Jorge Fossati in 2012.

=== Al Sadd SC ===
His skills would be tested for the 2012 Sheikh Jassem Cup where they played most of their matches with their second team, and were in the final defeated by Al Rayyan SC, 1–0. Talk in the league, even among pundits, praised the team's form having consecutively won the set of nine matches that began the season, setting a league record. Sadd were eventually held to a goalless draw by Al Kharaitiyat on 8 December 2012. Al-Sadd won the league on 13 April 2013, one match before the end of the league. The victory followed a hiatus since the Al-Sadd league victory in 2007.

=== Return to Wydad AC ===
On 5 January 2017, Ammouta was announced as the new Wydad AC head coach, after long negotiations, as the Moroccan coach signed a contract extending for one and a half seasons, replacing French coach Sébastien Desabre.

On 18 August 2022, Ammouta was announced as the new Wydad AC head coach, replacing Walid Regragui who was transferred to coach the Moroccan national team.

=== AS FAR ===
From May to June 2023, he led the AS FAR Club as general supervisor at the end of the remaining season, because the coach law adopted by the Royal Moroccan Football Federation does not allow coaching two teams in the league during the same season, He led them to win the Moroccan League title.

=== Jordan ===
On 27 June 2023, Ammouta was appointed as the Jordan national team coach. In the 2023 AFC Asian Cup, Jordan qualified to the knockout stages as one of the best teams placed third in the group stage. He later led the Jordanians to defeat Iraq 3–2 in the round of 16, and Tajikistan 1–0 in the quarter-finals. In the semi-finals, Jordan achieved a significant victory by defeating South Korea 2–0, which guaranteed their first appearance in the final of the Asian Cup. However, in the final, Jordan was defeated by the hosting country, Qatar, with a score of 3–1. In June 2024, he stepped down as the head coach of Jordan after successfully leading the team to the top of their group in the second round of the 2026 FIFA World Cup qualification, securing their spot in the third round.

=== Al Jazira ===
On 8 July 2024, Ammouta was appointed as the new coach of Emirati club Al Jazira by signing a contract until 2026. He was dismissed by the club on 17 August 2025, following a 3–2 defeat against Khor Fakkan.

=== Al Ahly SC ===
On 15 June 2026, Ammouta was announced as the new coach of Egyptian club Al Ahly, by signing a two-year contract to replace Danish coach Jess Thorup.

== Career statistics ==
=== Managerial ===
As of match played 1 September 2026

Team	From	To	Record				
Team	From	To	G	W	D	L	Win %
(Morocco) FUS de Rabat	2008	2011	161	68	60	33	42.24
(Qatar) Al-Sadd	2012	2015	104	59	27	18	56.73
(Morocco) Wydad AC	2017	2018	45	24	9	12	53.33
Morocco A	2019	2022	10	8	1	1	80.00
(Morocco) Wydad AC	2022	2023	11	7	3	1	63.64
Jordan	2023	2024	20	9	3	8	45.00
(United Arab Emirates) Al Jazira	8 July 2024	17 August 2025	36	16	7	13	44.44
(Egypt) Al Ahly	15 June 2026	present	13	11	2	0	84.62
Total			400	202	112	86	50.50

== Honours ==
=== Player ===
Fath Union Sport

- Moroccan Throne Cup: 1994–95

Al-Sadd

- Qatar Stars League: 1999–2000
- Emir of Qatar Cup: 1999–2000, 2000–01
- Crown Prince Cup: 1998
- Sheikh Jassim Cup: 1997, 1999

Qatar SC

- Qatar Stars League: 2002–03
- Crown Prince Cup: 2002

=== Manager ===
Fath Union Sport

- Botola Pro 2: 2008–09
- Moroccan Throne Cup: 2010
- CAF Confederation Cup: 2010

Al-Sadd

- Qatar Stars League: 2012–13
- Emir of Qatar Cup: 2013–14, 2014–15
- Sheikh Jassem Cup: 2014

Wydad AC

- Botola Pro: 2016–17
- CAF Champions League: 2017

Al Jazira

- UAE League Cup: 2024–25

Morocco A'

- African Nations Championship: 2020

Jordan

- AFC Asian Cup runner-up: 2023

=== Player ===
- Botola Pro Top Goalscorer: 1993–94
- Qatar Stars League Top Goalscorer: 1997–98
- Qatar Emir Cup Top Goalscorer: 2000–01 (7 goals 7 games)

=== Manager ===
- Qatar Stars League Manager of the Season: 2012–13
- Qatar Stars League Manager of the Month: October 2014, April 2015
- Botola Pro Manager of the Season: 2016–17
- African Nations Championship Best Coach: 2020

Order

- Silver Jubilee Medal (Jordan): 2024
