= Thiago Oliveira =

Brazilian footballer

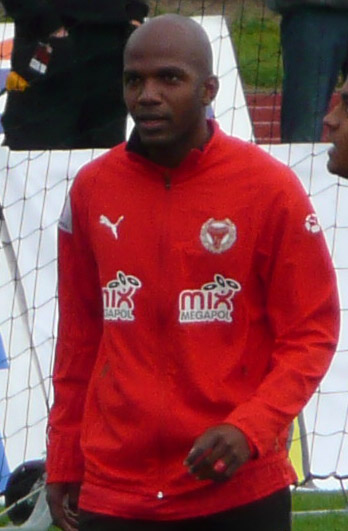
- Oliveira with Kalmar FF in 2007

Personal information
- Full name: Thiago de Oliveira Santos
- Date of birth: 26 May 1981 (age 45)
- Place of birth: Rio de Janeiro, Brazil
- Height: 1.75 m (5 ft 9 in)
- Position: Forward

Team information
- Current team: União São João (head coach)

Youth career
- 1997–2000: São Paulo

Senior career*
Years	Team	Apps	(Gls)
2001–2003	São Paulo	9	(0)
2001	→ Vitória (loan)	9	(0)
2002	→ Matonense (loan)	8	(1)
2003	→ Avaí (loan)	9	(1)
2003–2006	Al Ahli		
2005	→ Portuguesa (loan)	27	(4)
2006	→ Brasiliense (loan)	15	(2)
2007	Caxias	2	(0)
2007	Kalmar FF	2	(1)
2008	Itumbiara	4	(0)
2008–2009	Al Ahli		
2009–2010	Qatar SC		
2011	Rio Branco-SP	12	(0)
2011	Desportivo Brasil	9	(0)
2015	Juventus de Seara	4	(0)

International career
2001	Brazil U20	4	(0)

Managerial career
- 2014: Sinop
- 2015: Dom Bosco
- 2015: Taboão da Serra
- 2016: Batatais
- 2016–2017: Caldense
- 2018: Penapolense
- 2018: Batatais
- 2019: Penapolense
- 2019: Batatais
- 2019–2020: Patrocinense
- 2020: Sertãozinho
- 2021: Patrocinense
- 2021: Sertãozinho
- 2021–2022: Votuporanguense
- 2022: Flamengo de Arcoverde
- 2023: Patrocinense
- 2023: Caldense
- 2024: Bandeirante
- 2024: Uberaba
- 2025: Caldense
- 2026–: União São João
- * Club domestic league appearances and goals

Thiago de Oliveira Santos (born 26 May 1981) is a Brazilian football coach and former player who played as a forward. He is the current head coach of União São João.

== Career ==
After playing for São Paulo, Oliveira signed for Al Ahli in Qatar, where he played with Pep Guardiola, who he discussed tactics with. In 2008, he returned to Al Ahli because his family adapted to Qatar well.

== Honours ==
São Paulo

- Torneio Rio–São Paulo: 2001
- Supercampeonato Paulista: 2002
