= 2009 Qatar Crown Prince Cup =

2009 Crown Prince Cup
Tournament details
- Host country: Qatar
- Dates: 28 April – 1 May
- Teams: 4

Final positions
- Champions: Qatar SC (3rd title)

The 2009 Qatar Crown Prince Cup was the 15th edition of the cup tournament in men's football (soccer). It is played by the top-four teams of the Qatar Stars League after the end of each season.

== 2009 Participants ==
- Al-Gharrafa : Qatari League 2008–09 Champion
- Al-Sadd : Qatari League 2008–09 Runner Up
- Al-Rayyan : Qatari League 2008–09 3rd Place
- Qatar SC : Qatari League 2008–09 4th Place

== Bracket ==
Semi-finals
2009-04-28 - Doha
(Qatar) Al-Sadd	0
(Qatar) Al-Rayyan	3
2009-04-28 - Doha
(Qatar) Al-Gharrafa	1
Qatar SC	2

Final
2009-05-01 - Doha
(Qatar) Al-Rayyan	0 (2)
Qatar SC	0 (4)

== Matches ==
=== Semi-finals ===
28 April 2009

Al-Sadd	0 – 3	Al-Rayyan
		Amara Diané 54' (pen); Ricardinho 57'; Adel Lamy 89'

Jassim Bin Hamad Stadium

28 April 2009

Al-Gharrafa	1 – 2 AET	Qatar SC
Clemerson de Araújo 46'; Qasem Burhan (red card) 115'		Márcio José de Oliveira 14'; Roger Galera Flores 97'

Jassim Bin Hamad Stadium

=== Final ===
1 May 2009

Al-Rayyan	0 – 0 2 - 4 on penalties	Qatar SC

Jassim Bin Hamad Stadium

Qatar Crown Prince Cup
2009 Winners
Qatar SC
3rd Title
