= 2010 Sheikh Jassim Cup =

Football

The 2010 Sheikh Jassim Cup was the 32nd edition of the league cup competition for football teams from Qatar.

Umm-Salal were the defending champions.

== Round One Groups ==
14 clubs were drawn into 4 groups of 4 or 5 teams. The winners qualify for the semi-finals.

All group games are played in one 'host' location, instead of the common home and away format used in other competitions

Group A	Group B	Group C	Group C
Al-Gharafa; Al-Khor; Al-Markhiya; Al-Rayyan; Lekhwiya	El Jaish; Al-Mu'aidar; Al-Shamal; Al-Wakra; Qatar SC	Al-Ahli; Al-Mesaimeer; Al-Sadd; Umm-Salal	Al-Arabi; Al-Kharitiyath; Al-Sailiya; Al-Shahaniya

=== Final standings ===
==== Group A ====
Pos	Team	Pld	W	D	L	GF	GA	GD	Pts
1	Lekhwiya	4	4	0	0	9	2	+7	12
2	Al Khor	4	3	0	1	5	5	0	9
3	Al Gharafa	4	2	0	2	11	3	+8	6
4	Al Rayyan	4	1	0	3	8	11	−3	3
5	Al-Markhiya	4	0	0	4	0	12	−12	0

Source: http://www.goalzz.com/main.aspx?c=4924&stage=1&sch=true
Rules for classification: 1) points; 2) goal difference; 3) number of goals scored.

==== Group B ====
Pos	Team	Pld	W	D	L	GF	GA	GD	Pts
1	Al Wakra	4	4	0	0	9	3	+6	12
2	Qatar SC	4	3	0	1	10	4	+6	9
3	El Jaish	4	2	0	2	13	5	+8	6
4	Al-Mu'aidar	4	1	0	3	6	14	−8	3
5	Al Shamal	4	0	0	4	3	15	−12	0

Source: http://www.goalzz.com/main.aspx?c=4924&stage=1&sch=true
Rules for classification: 1) points; 2) goal difference; 3) number of goals scored.

==== Group C ====
Pos	Team	Pld	W	D	L	GF	GA	GD	Pts
1	Al Sadd	3	2	1	0	8	2	+6	7
2	Umm Salal	3	2	1	0	3	1	+2	7
3	Al Ahli	3	1	0	2	3	6	−3	3
4	Mesaimeer	3	0	0	3	1	6	−5	0

Source: http://www.goalzz.com/main.aspx?c=4924&stage=1&sch=true
Rules for classification: 1) points; 2) goal difference; 3) number of goals scored.

==== Group D ====
Pos	Team	Pld	W	D	L	GF	GA	GD	Pts
1	Al-Arabi	3	2	1	0	9	1	+8	7
2	Al Kharitiyath	3	2	1	0	7	2	+5	7
3	Al Sailiya	3	1	0	2	5	8	−3	3
4	Al Shahaniya	3	0	0	3	0	10	−10	0

Source: http://www.goalzz.com/main.aspx?c=4924&stage=1&sch=true
Rules for classification: 1) points; 2) goal difference; 3) number of goals scored.

== Semi-finals ==
31 August 2010
20:00

Lekhwiya	2–1	Al-Sadd

1 September 2010
20:00

Al-Wakra	2–2	Al-Arabi
Penalties
	3–4

== Final ==
5 September 2010
20:00

Lekhwiya	0 – 1	Al-Arabi
