= Paulão (footballer, born 1973) =

Brazilian footballer

Personal information
- Full name: Paulo Frederico Benevenute
- Date of birth: 26 December 1973 (age 52)
- Place of birth: Santo André, Brazil
- Height: 1.84 m (6 ft 0 in)
- Position: Centre-back

Senior career*
| Years | Team | Apps | (Gls) |
- ?
- Mogi Mirim
| 1999 | São Paulo | 15 | (0) |
| 2000–2001 | Vitória de Guimarães | 28 | (3) |
| 2001 | Santa Cruz | 19 | (1) |
| 2002 | Juventude | 22 | (0) |
| 2003 | Guarani | 20 | (2) |
| 2003–2004 | Al Khor | | |
| 2005 | Atlético Sorocaba | | |
| 2006 | Vasco da Gama | 11 | (1) |
| 2007 | Rio Branco (SP) | | |
| 2007 | Grêmio Barueri | 30 | (3) |
| 2009 | Madureira | | |
- * Club domestic league appearances and goals

Paulo Frederico Benevenute (born 26 December 1973), known as Paulão, is a retired Brazilian footballer.

== Biography ==
Born in Santo André, São Paulo state, Paulão played a season for São Paulo FC in 1999 Campeonato Brasileiro Série A, when he passed out in his presentation; he was nicknamed Paulão Desmaio by the supporters. He then played a season in Portugal for Vitória de Guimarães and moved back to Santa Cruz in August 2001. He played for Juventude in the next season, and left for Guarani in 2003. In October 2003 he left for Al Khor. In January 2005, he returned to Brazil and signed a contract until the end of 2005 Campeonato Paulista with Atlético Sorocaba. He then played for Série A side Vasco da Gama and Grêmio Barueri of Série B, and also played for Rio Branco Esporte Clube at 2007 Campeonato Paulista.
