= Burrda Sport =

Specialized manufacturer of sports equipment

Burrda
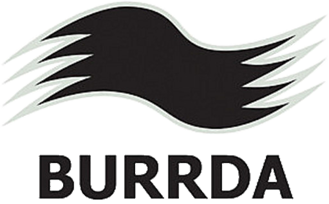
- Industry: Sports equipments
- Founded: 2006; 19 years ago in Geneva, Switzerland
- Headquarters: Doha, Qatar
- Products: Teamwear, sportswear, shoes, sport accessories
- Website: www.burrdasport.com

Burrda Sport is a specialized manufacturer of sports equipment. Since 2007, Burrda Sport has been the supplier and partner of many clubs and national teams in football, rugby, handball and Formula 1, especially in Europe and the Middle East.

== Sponsoring ==
In football, Burrda Sport is a partner with clubs such as Al Sadd Sports Club in Qatar, as well as being a former partner of OGC Nice. Burrda Sport also rose to the Kuwait national team during the 2011 AFC Asian Cup in Qatar, Belgium national team at the 2014 World Cup in Brazil and the Tunisian national team at the 2015 Africa Cup of Nations.
