= Abdoul Salam Sow =

Guinean footballer (born 1970)

Personal information
- Date of birth: 13 August 1970 (age 56)
- Place of birth: Conakry, Guinea
- Position: Midfielder

Youth career
- Thouars Foot 79

Senior career*
Years	Team	Apps	(Gls)
1993–1994	Kortrijk	17	(3)
1994–1995	Ankaragücü	19	(0)
1995–1996	Martigues	23	(3)
1996	Jeonnam Dragons	3	(0)
1997–1998	Belenenses	18	(0)
1998–1999	Skoda Xanthi	2	(0)
2000–2001	Marco	17	(6)
2001–2002	Imortal		
2003–2005	Gharafa		
2005–2006	Hafia		

International career
1993–2005	Guinea	53	(6)
- * Club domestic league appearances and goals

Abdoul Salam Sow (born 13 August 1970) is a Guinean former professional footballer who played as a midfielder for Ankaragücü, FC Martigues, Belenenses, Imortal, Qatar SC and Jeonnam Dragons. He represented the Guinea national team internationally.

== Club career ==
Sow was born in Conakry, Guinea. He played one season with Martigues in the French Ligue 1. He also had a spell with Ankaragücü in the Turkish Süper Lig.

== International career ==
Sow was part of the Guinea national team at the 2004 African Nations Cup, which finished second in their group in the first round of competition, before losing in the quarter-finals to Mali.
