= 2001–02 Qatar Stars League =

38th season of top-tier football league in Qatar

Qatar Stars League
- Season: 2001–02
- Champions: Al-Ittihad
- AFC Champions League: Al-Ittihad; Al Sadd
- Top goalscorer: (Algeria) Rachid Amrane (16 goals)

Statistics of Qatar Stars League for the 2001–02 season.

== Overview ==
Nine teams competed for the championship, which was won by Al-Ittihad.

== Personnel ==
Note: Flags indicate national team as has been defined under FIFA eligibility rules. Players may hold more than one non-FIFA nationality.

Team	Manager
Al Ahli	(Qatar) Eid Mubarak
Al-Arabi	(Qatar) Abdullah Saad
Al-Ittifaq	(Somalia) Hassan Afif
Al-Ittihad	(Austria) Josef Hickersberger
Al-Rayyan	(Brazil) Amarildo
Al Sadd	(Romania) Ilie Balaci
Al-Taawon	(Brazil) João Francisco
Al-Wakrah	(Iraq) Mejbel Fartous
Qatar SC	(Federal Republic of Yugoslavia) Zoran Đorđević

== Foreign players ==
Club	Player 1	Player 2	Player 3	Player 4	Former players
Al Ahli	(Burundi) Juma Mossi	(Iraq) Haidar Abdul-Razzaq	(Morocco) Rachid Daoudi		(Burkina Faso) Seydou Traoré
Al-Arabi	(Brazil) Paulinho	(Kuwait) Mohammed Kamal	(Nigeria) Ayuba Mbwas Mangut		
Al-Ittifaq	(Morocco) Saïd Rokbi	(Tanzania) Bakari Malima	(Tanzania) Mathias Mulumba		(Bahrain) Rashid Al-Dosari
Al-Ittihad	(Algeria) Rachid Amrane	(Brazil) Osvaldo	(Ghana) Tony Yeboah	(Iraq) Emad Mohammed	(Brazil) Toninho
Al-Rayyan	(Colombia) Ricardo Pérez	(Kuwait) Bashar Abdullah	(Kuwait) Jamal Mubarak	(Kuwait) Jasem Al-Huwaidi	
Al Sadd	(Algeria) Ali Benarbia	(Iran) Karim Bagheri	(Morocco) Bouchaib El Moubarki	(Nigeria) John Utaka	
Al-Taawon	(Liberia) Frank Seator	(Morocco) Rachid Rokki			
Al-Wakrah	(Guinea) Ousmane Soumah	(Senegal) Mamoun Diop			
Qatar SC	(Angola) Akwá	(Benin) Léon Bessan	(Brazil) Edmilson	(Iraq) Radhi Shenaishil	(Mali) Boubacar Nientao

== League standings ==
Pos	Team	Pld	W	D	L	GF	GA	GD	Pts
1	Al-Ittihad	16	13	2	1	42	18	+24	41
2	Qatar SC	16	9	2	5	30	17	+13	29
3	Al-Rayyan	16	8	1	7	30	27	+3	25
4	Al Sadd	16	7	4	5	31	30	+1	25
5	Al-Wakrah	16	5	4	7	29	31	−2	19
6	Al Ahli	16	5	4	7	21	28	−7	19
7	Al-Arabi	16	5	3	8	28	32	−4	18
8	Al-Taawon	16	4	6	6	21	26	−5	18
9	Al-Ittifaq	16	2	2	12	12	35	−23	8

Source: RSSSF
