= 2003–04 Qatar Stars League =

40th season of top-tier football league in Qatar

Qatar Stars League
- Season: 2003–04
- Champions: Al Sadd
- AFC Champions League: Al Sadd; Al-Rayyan
- Top goalscorer: (Argentina) Gabriel Batistuta (25 goals)

Statistics of Qatar Stars League for the 2003–04 season.

== Overview ==
It was contested by 10 teams, and Al Sadd won the championship.

For the first time, the QFA allocated each club with $10,000,000 to sign foreign players. As a result, Gabriel Batistuta, Pep Guardiola, Stefan Effenberg, Fernando Hierro, and Claudio Caniggia, among others, joined the league in the summer of 2003.

== Personnel ==
Note: Flags indicate national team as has been defined under FIFA eligibility rules. Players may hold more than one non-FIFA nationality.

Team	Manager
Al Ahli	(Brazil) Pepe
Al-Arabi	(Germany) Wolfgang Sidka
Al-Ittihad	(Belgium) Tom Saintfiet
Al-Khor	(Switzerland) Robert Mullier
Al-Rayyan	(France) Jean Castaneda
Al Sadd	(Croatia) Luka Peruzović
Al-Sailiya	(France) Pierre Lechantre
Al-Shamal	(Brazil) Valdeir Vieira
Al-Wakrah	(Bosnia and Herzegovina) Džemal Hadžiabdić
Qatar SC	(Bosnia and Herzegovina) Džemaludin Mušović

== Foreign players ==
Club	Player 1	Player 2	Player 3	Player 4	Player 5	Player 6	Former players
Al Ahli	(Brazil) Sandro Zamboni	(Brazil) Thiago Oliveira	(Cape Verde) Caló	(Cape Verde) Zé Piguita	(Ivory Coast) Ibrahima Koné	(Spain) Pep Guardiola	
Al-Arabi	(Algeria) Noureddine Drioueche	(Argentina) Gabriel Batistuta	(Germany) Stefan Effenberg	(Kenya) Dennis Oliech	(Morocco) Rachid Benmahmoud	(Slovenia) Fabijan Cipot	(Egypt) Mohamed Barakat
Al-Ittihad	(Algeria) Djamel Belmadi	(Brazil) Amaral	(Cameroon) Pius N'Diefi	(Guinea) Abdoul Salam Sow	(Guinea) Kaba Diawara	(Iraq) Emad Mohammed	
Al-Khor	(Brazil) Osvaldo	(Brazil) Paulão	(France) Pascal Nouma	(Morocco) Rachid Rokki			
Al-Rayyan	(Algeria) Ali Benarbia	(Germany) Mario Basler	(Morocco) Bouchaib El Moubarki	(Spain) Fernando Hierro			
Al Sadd	(Ecuador) Carlos Tenorio	(France) Frank Leboeuf	(Ivory Coast) Abdul Kader Keïta	(Morocco) Youssef Chippo			
Al-Sailiya	(Algeria) Karim Kerkar	(Brazil) Bruno Cazarine	(Cameroon) Nicolas Alnoudji	(France) David Mazzoncini	(France) William Prunier	(Guinea) Titi Camara	(Brazil) Anselmo
Al-Shamal	(Bahrain) Duaij Naser Abdulla	(Benin) Léon Bessan	(Iraq) Ahmad Abdul-Jabar	(Iraq) Haidar Mahmoud	(Iraq) Razzaq Farhan	(Morocco) Abdelhak Benbella	(Netherlands) Omar Boukhari
Al-Wakrah	(Bolivia) Julio César Baldivieso	(Burundi) Omar Mussa	(Democratic Republic of the Congo) Rock Buskapa	(Guinea) Ousmane Soumah	(Morocco) Lahcen Abrami		(Burkina Faso) Romeo Kambou
Qatar SC	(Angola) Akwá	(Argentina) Claudio Caniggia	(Iraq) Radhi Shenaishil	(Morocco) Saïd Chiba			

== League standings ==
Pos	Team	Pld	W	D	L	GF	GA	GD	Pts
1	Al Sadd	18	13	3	2	38	10	+28	42
2	Qatar SC	18	10	4	4	31	17	+14	34
3	Al-Arabi	18	9	4	5	38	32	+6	31
4	Al Ahli	18	7	7	4	33	28	+5	28
5	Al-Rayyan	18	8	3	7	38	32	+6	27
6	Al-Ittihad	18	7	5	6	33	24	+9	26
7	Al-Wakrah	18	7	4	7	26	32	−6	25
8	Al-Khor	18	6	6	6	30	25	+5	24
9	Al-Shamal	18	1	4	13	30	56	−26	7
10	Al-Sailiya	18	0	4	14	20	61	−41	4

Source: RSSSF
