= 2004–05 Qatar Stars League =

41st season of top-tier football league in Qatar

Qatar Stars League
- Season: 2004–05
- Champions: Al-Gharafa
- AFC Champions League: Al-Gharafa; Al Sadd
- Top goalscorer: (Brazil) Sonny Anderson (20 goals)

Statistics of Qatar Stars League for the 2004–05 season.

== Overview ==
It was contested by 10 teams, and Al-Gharafa won the league.

== Personnel ==
Note: Flags indicate national team as has been defined under FIFA eligibility rules. Players may hold more than one non-FIFA nationality.

Team	Manager
Al Ahli	(Brazil) Pepe
Al-Arabi	(Brazil) Valdeir Vieira
Al-Gharafa	(France) Bruno Metsu
Al Kharaitiyat	(Brazil) João Francisco
Al-Khor	(France) René Exbrayat
Al-Rayyan	(Denmark) Jørgen E. Larsen
Al Sadd	(Serbia and Montenegro) Bora Milutinović
Al-Shamal	(Germany) Reinhard Fabisch
Al-Wakrah	(Iraq) Adnan Dirjal
Qatar SC	(Portugal) Carlos Alhinho

== Foreign players ==
Club	Player 1	Player 2	Player 3	Player 4	Player 5	AFC player	Former players
Al Ahli	(Cape Verde) Caló	(Cape Verde) Zé Piguita	(Morocco) Bouabid Bouden	(Portugal) Marco Couto	(Spain) Pep Guardiola	(Syria) Firas Al-Khatib	(Brazil) Thiago Oliveira (Portugal) José Dominguez
Al-Arabi	(Bahrain) Mohamed Salmeen	(Kenya) Dennis Oliech	(Nigeria) Taribo West	(Slovenia) Fabijan Cipot	(Venezuela) Héctor Bidoglio	(Bahrain) Rashid Al-Dosari	(Argentina) Gabriel Batistuta (Brazil) Anderson Barbosa
Al-Gharafa	(Bahrain) A'ala Hubail	(Brazil) Rodrigo Mendes	(France) Marcel Desailly	(Morocco) Otmane El Assas	(Uruguay) Sebastián Soria	(Bahrain) Mohamed Hubail	(Cameroon) Pius N'Diefi (Guinea) Abdoul Salam Sow
Al Kharaitiyat	(Algeria) Djamel Belmadi	(Algeria) Karim Benounes	(Bahrain) Mohamed Husain	(Brazil) Djair	(Guinea) Kaba Diawara	(Bahrain) Sayed Mahmood Jalal	
Al-Khor	(Bahrain) Sayed Mohamed Adnan	(Democratic Republic of the Congo) Camille Muzinga	(Iraq) Qusay Munir	(Morocco) Rachid Rokki	(Morocco) Youssef Rossi	(Iraq) Younis Mahmoud	(Brazil) Paulão (France) Reynald Pedros
Al-Rayyan	(Algeria) Ali Benarbia	(Bahrain) Abdulla Al-Marzooqi	(Brazil) Sonny Anderson	(Netherlands) Frank de Boer	(Netherlands) Ronald de Boer	(Bahrain) Husain Ali	
Al Sadd	(Ecuador) Carlos Tenorio	(Ivory Coast) Abdul Kader Keïta	(Morocco) Youssef Chippo	(Nigeria) Victor Ikpeba		(Iran) Hossein Kaebi	(Argentina) Ezequiel Amaya
Al-Shamal	(Bahrain) Duaij Naser Abdulla	(Brazil) Anderson	(Brazil) Marcone	(Morocco) Abdelhak Benbella	(Portugal) José Soares	(Bahrain) Hussain Ali Baba	(Iraq) Ahmed Salah Alwan
Al-Wakrah	(Democratic Republic of the Congo) Rock Buskapa	(France) Frank Leboeuf	(Iraq) Emad Mohammed	(Morocco) Bouchaib El Moubarki	(Serbia and Montenegro) Vanja Grubač	(Kuwait) Musaed Neda	(Brazil) Fabiano Eller (Guinea) Ousmane Soumah
Qatar SC	(Angola) Akwá	(Bahrain) Saleh Farhan	(Iraq) Radhi Shenaishil	(Morocco) Merouane Zemmama		(Iraq) Razzaq Farhan	(France) Christophe Dugarry

== League standings ==
Pos	Team	Pld	W	D	L	GF	GA	GD	Pts
1	Al-Gharafa	27	20	6	1	71	23	+48	66
2	Al-Rayyan	27	15	7	5	66	34	+32	52
3	Al-Khor	27	14	6	7	46	30	+16	48
4	Qatar SC	27	14	3	10	40	34	+6	45
5	Al-Arabi	27	12	8	7	53	35	+18	44
6	Al-Wakrah	27	9	7	11	37	35	+2	34
7	Al Sadd	27	9	7	11	35	35	0	34
8	Al Ahli	27	7	7	13	35	55	−20	28
9	Al-Shamal	27	4	3	20	22	67	−45	15
10	Al Kharaitiyat	27	2	4	21	24	81	−57	10

Source: RSSSF
