= 2000–01 Qatar Stars League =

37th season of top-tier football league in Qatar

Qatar Stars League
- Season: 2000–01
- Champions: Al-Wakrah
- Asian Club Championship: Al-Wakrah
- Top goalscorer: (Senegal) Mamoun Diop (14 goals)

Statistics of Qatar Stars League for the 2000–01 season.

== Overview ==
It was contested by 9 teams, and Al-Wakrah won the league.

== Personnel ==
Note: Flags indicate national team as has been defined under FIFA eligibility rules. Players may hold more than one non-FIFA nationality.

Team	Manager
Al Ahli	(Brazil) Ziza
Al-Arabi	(Chile) Luis Santibáñez
Al-Ittihad	(Spain) Juan Pedro Benali
Al-Rayyan	(Brazil) Paulo Campos
Al Sadd	(Netherlands) René Meulensteen
Al-Shamal	(Russia) Dmitry Kuzmichev
Al-Taawon	(Brazil) Paulo Henrique
Al-Wakrah	(Brazil) José Paulo
Qatar SC	(Czech Republic) Verner Lička

== Foreign players ==
Club	Player 1	Player 2	Player 3	Player 4	Former players
Al Ahli	(Burkina Faso) Seydou Traoré				
Al-Arabi					
Al-Ittihad	(Angola) Akwá	(Bahrain) Mohamed Husain	(Brazil) Osvaldo	(Brazil) Toninho	
Al-Rayyan	(Brazil) Sílvio	(Kuwait) Jamal Mubarak	(Liberia) Frank Seator	(Tunisia) Sami Trabelsi	
Al Sadd	(Iraq) Radhi Shenaishil	(Morocco) Hussein Ammouta	(Senegal) Alboury Lah		
Al-Shamal					
Al-Taawon	(Morocco) Rachid Rokki				
Al-Wakrah	(Brazil) Sidicley	(Jordan) Abdullah Abu Zema	(Jordan) Badran Al-Shaqran	(Senegal) Mamoun Diop	
Qatar SC	(Benin) Léon Bessan	(Ecuador) Gilson de Souza	(Mali) Boubacar Nientao		(Ghana) Felix Aboagye (Iran) Nader Mohammadkhani

== League standings ==
Pos	Team	Pld	W	D	L	GF	GA	GD	Pts
1	Al-Wakrah	16	10	2	4	29	22	+7	32
2	Al-Arabi	16	8	5	3	28	18	+10	29
3	Al-Taawon	16	8	4	4	25	15	+10	28
4	Al-Rayyan	16	8	4	4	30	22	+8	28
5	Al-Ittihad	16	8	4	4	27	19	+8	28
6	Al Sadd	16	7	3	6	25	21	+4	24
7	Al Ahli	16	5	3	8	32	34	−2	18
8	Qatar SC	16	4	2	10	18	27	−9	14
9	Al-Shamal	16	0	1	15	14	50	−36	1

Source: RSSSF
