= 2002–03 Qatar Stars League =

39th season of top-tier football league in Qatar

Qatar Stars League
- Season: 2002–03
- Champions: Qatar SC
- AFC Champions League: Qatar SC; Al Sadd
- Top goalscorer: (Morocco) Rachid Rokki (15 goals)

Statistics of Qatar Stars League for the 2002–03 season.

== Overview ==
It was contested by 10 teams, and Qatar SC won the championship.

== Personnel ==
Note: Flags indicate national team as has been defined under FIFA eligibility rules. Players may hold more than one non-FIFA nationality.

Team	Manager
Al Ahli	(Portugal) Carlos Alhinho
Al-Arabi	(Brazil) Carlos Roberto Pereira
Al-Ittifaq	(Somalia) Hassan Afif
Al-Ittihad	(France) Christian Gourcuff
Al-Rayyan	(France) Jean Castaneda
Al Sadd	(Croatia) Luka Peruzović
Al-Shamal	(Germany) Uli Maslo
Al-Taawon	(Spain) Ladislas Lozano
Al-Wakrah	(Serbia) Nebojša Vučković
Qatar SC	(Bosnia and Herzegovina) Džemaludin Mušović

== Foreign players ==
Club	Player 1	Player 2	Player 3	Player 4	Player 5	Former players
Al Ahli	(Angola) Joni	(Cape Verde) Caló				
Al-Arabi	(Brazil) Reinaldo	(Kenya) Dennis Oliech	(Morocco) Mohamed Armoumen			(Tunisia) Zoubeir Baya
Al-Ittifaq	(Tanzania) Bakari Malima	(Tanzania) Mathias Mulumba				
Al-Ittihad	(Brazil) Osvaldo	(Chile) Cristián Montecinos	(Chile) Patricio Almendra	(Guinea) Abdoul Salam Sow	(Ivory Coast) Bakari Koné	(Colombia) Ricardo Pérez (Germany) Olaf Marschall
Al-Khor	(Morocco) Mohammed Benchrifa	(Morocco) Rachid Rokki				
Al-Rayyan	(Algeria) Abdelhafid Tasfaout	(Algeria) Lakhdar Adjali	(Brazil) Anderson	(Colombia) Víctor Bonilla	(Ivory Coast) Hamed Modibo Diallo	
Al Sadd	(Brazil) Romário	(Brazil) Sérgio Ricardo	(Ivory Coast) Abdul Kader Keïta	(Oman) Hani Al-Dhabit	(Slovenia) Fabijan Cipot	(Morocco) Bouchaib El Moubarki (Togo) Lantame Ouadja
Al-Shamal	(Iraq) Ahmad Abdul-Jabar	(Iraq) Haidar Mahmoud	(Iraq) Hashim Ridha	(Netherlands) Omar Boukhari		
Al-Wakrah	(Burkina Faso) Romeo Kambou	(Guinea) Ousmane Soumah	(Tunisia) Imed Ben Younes			
Qatar SC	(Angola) Akwá	(Benin) Léon Bessan	(Brazil) Émerson	(Iraq) Radhi Shenaishil	(Morocco) Saïd Chiba	(Burundi) Juma Mossi (Morocco) Hussein Ammouta

== League standings ==
Pos	Team	Pld	W	D	L	GF	GA	GD	Pts
1	Qatar SC	18	10	5	3	24	10	+14	35
2	Al Sadd	18	9	4	5	30	14	+16	31
3	Al-Khor	18	9	4	5	28	20	+8	31
4	Al-Ittihad	18	7	9	2	29	22	+7	30
5	Al Ahli	18	8	5	5	21	16	+5	29
6	Al-Rayyan	18	8	4	6	24	22	+2	28
7	Al-Wakrah	18	7	3	8	20	19	+1	24
8	Al-Arabi	18	6	3	9	23	27	−4	21
9	Al-Shamal	18	3	6	9	17	37	−20	15
10	Al-Ittifaq	18	0	3	15	10	39	−29	3

Source: RSSSF
