= 1999–2000 Qatar Stars League =

36th season of top-tier football league in Qatar

Qatar Stars League
- Season: 1999–2000
- Champions: Al Sadd
- Asian Club Championship: Al Sadd
- Top goalscorer: (Qatar) Mohammed Salem Al-Enazi (14 goals)

Statistics of Qatar Stars League for the 1999–2000 season.

== Overview ==
It was contested by 9 teams, and Al Sadd won the championship.

== Personnel ==
Team	Head coach
Al Ahli	(Brazil) Ziza
Al-Arabi	(Brazil) José Paulo
Al-Ittihad	(Netherlands) René Meulensteen
Al-Rayyan	(Denmark) Jørgen E. Larsen
Al Sadd	(Brazil) Procópio Cardoso
Al-Shamal	(Egypt) Maher Siddiq
Al-Taawon	(Brazil) José Roberto Ávila
Al-Wakrah	(Iraq) Adnan Dirjal
Qatar SC	(Germany) Reinhard Fabisch

== Foreign players ==
Team	Player 1	Player 2	Player 3	Former players
Al Ahli				
Al-Arabi	(Cameroon) Jérémie N'Jock	(Kuwait) Bashar Abdullah		
Al-Ittihad	(Angola) Akwá	(Bahrain) Mohamed Husain	(Brazil) Osvaldo	(Liberia) Frank Seator
Al-Rayyan	(Ecuador) Gilson de Souza	(Kuwait) Abdullah Wabran	(Tunisia) Ferid Chouchane	(Poland) Piotr Rowicki (Senegal) Mamadou Sow (Ukraine) Oleksandr Haiduk
Al Sadd	(Iraq) Radhi Shenaishil	(Morocco) Hussein Ammouta		
Al-Shamal				(Brazil) Regis
Al-Taawon				
Al-Wakrah				
Qatar SC	(Burkina Faso) Seydou Traoré	(Iraq) Samir Kadhim Hassan	(Sudan) Walieldin Mohamed	(Hungary) József Duró

== League standings ==
Pos	Team	Pld	W	D	L	GF	GA	GD	Pts
1	Al Sadd	16	12	2	2	36	8	+28	38
2	Al-Rayyan	16	10	4	2	29	14	+15	34
3	Al-Arabi	16	7	5	4	36	17	+19	26
4	Al-Ittihad	16	5	8	3	24	15	+9	23
5	Al Ahli	16	5	5	6	17	26	−9	20
6	Al-Wakrah	16	5	4	7	22	22	0	19
7	Qatar SC	16	4	6	6	14	24	−10	18
8	Al-Taawon	16	3	7	6	19	23	−4	16
9	Al-Shamal	16	0	1	15	12	60	−48	1

Source: RSSSF
