= Rachid Rokki =

Moroccan footballer

Personal information
- Full name: Rachid Rokki
- Date of birth: 8 November 1974 (age 51)
- Place of birth: Mohammedia, Morocco
- Height: 1.80 m (5 ft 11 in)
- Position: Striker

Team information
- Current team: Al Jazira SCC
- Number: 10

Senior career*
Years	Team	Apps	(Gls)
1997–1998	SCCM de Mohammédia	34	(17)
1998–1999	Sevilla FC	8	(1)
1999–2000	Albacete Balompié	24	(8)
2000–2006	Al Khor	197	(114)
2006–2008	Umm-Salal	28	(15)
2008–2009	SCCM de Mohammédia	25	(11)
2009–2011	FUS de Rabat	25	(12)

International career^{‡}
1998–2004	Morocco	32	(8)
- * Club domestic league appearances and goals as of 25 May 2022 ‡ National team caps and goals as of 10 December 2021

Rachid Rokki (Arabic: رشيد روكي) (born 8 November 1974) is a Moroccan former footballer.

== Career ==
During his career he played for clubs such as Spanish side Sevilla and Albacete Balompié. His position was striker. During the Season 1997–1998, Rokki was the top scorer of his team SCCM de Mohammedia. His performances drew attention on a national scale, which earned him a place in the national squad.

== International ==
He was in the Moroccan squad for the 98 World Cup.
