= Khalid Salman =

Qatari footballer (born 1962)

Personal information
- Full name: Khalid Salman Al-Mahri Al-Muhannadi
- Date of birth: 5 April 1962 (age 64)
- Place of birth: Doha, Qatar
- Height: 1.78 m (5 ft 10 in)
- Positions: Striker; midfielder

Youth career
- 1976–1978: Al Sadd

Senior career*
Years	Team	Apps	(Gls)
1978–1998	Al Sadd		

International career
1981	Qatar Youth	5	(3)
1981–1998	Qatar	36	(4)
1984	Qatar Olympic	2	(2)
- * Club domestic league appearances and goals

Khalid Salman Al-Muhannadi (Arabic: خالد محمد سلمان المحري المهندي; born 5 April 1962) is a Qatari former footballer who represented the national team at the 1981 FIFA World Youth Championship, and multiple Gulf Cup tournaments, as well as the 1984 Summer Olympics. He is regarded as part of Qatar’s “golden generation” of the 1980s and 1990s, alongside Mansour Muftah, Ibrahim Khalfan, Mahmoud Soufi, Adel Khamis, and others. Among his most notable performances was his hat-trick against Brazil at the 1981 FIFA World Youth Championship and also his display against France at the 1984 Olympics. He retired from international football in September 1998, featuring in a farewell match against Sudan under coach Luiz Gonzaga, which ended in a 1–1 draw.

== Club career ==
In 1976, Salman began his club career with Al-Sadd's youth team at the age of fourteen, two years later, he was promoted to the senior squad by coach Hassan Othman. At his time at youth level, he helped the team win the "Youth League" in the 1977–78 season.

At senior level, Salman contributed several trophies during his tenure. One of his most memorable moments was a free-kick goal in the 1988–89 Asian Club Championship final which gave Al Sadd their first Asian title.

== International career ==
Salman first represented the Qatar Youth squad at the 1981 Youth World Cup. He was a key part in the team's progression to the final, scoring a hat-trick against Brazil Youth, finding the back of the net in the 10th, 54th, and 87th minute of the game. Earning Qatar Youth a spot in the final. Salman also represented the Qatar olympic team at the 1984 Summer Olympics, and scored a brace against France Olympic, which account for the only two goals Qatar scored during the tournament. He also played for the Qatar national football team at the Arabian Gulf Cup as well as the 1988 AFC Asian Cup finals, scoring a goal in the group stage.

== Personal life ==
Salman's brother, Salah, was also a football player, who played for Al-Sadd and the Qatar national team.

== Legacy ==
Salman was an influential player for both club and country, helping his club Al Sadd win numerous titles alongside teammates like Badr Bilal. To honour his playing career, his name was selected to be named for Aspire Zone Pitch 4 for the FIFA U-17 World Cup.

== Honours ==
=== Club ===
- Al-Sadd
  - Qatari League (6): 1978–79, 1979–80, 1980–81, 1986–87, 1987–88, 1988–89
  - Emir Cup (7): 1977–78, 1981–82, 1984–85, 1985–86, 1987–88, 1990–91, 1993–94
    - Runners-up (3): 1982–83, 1986–87, 1992–93
  - Sheikh Jassim Cup (9): 1977, 1978, 1979, 1981, 1985, 1986, 1988, 1990, 1997
  - Asian Club Championship (1): 1988–89
    - Runners-up (1): 1992
  - GCC Champions League (1): 1991

=== International ===
- FIFA World Youth Championship runner-up (1): 1981

== Career statistics ==
No.	Date	Venue	Opponent	Score	Result	Competition
1.	10 September 1984	Yuexiushan Stadium, Guangzhou, China	Afghanistan	2–0	8–0	1984 AFC Asian Cup qualification
2.	10 December 1984	National Stadium, Kallang, Singapore	South Korea	1–0	1–0	1984 AFC Asian Cup
3.	9 December 1988	Suheim bin Hamad Stadium, Doha, Qatar	South Korea	1–2	2–3	1988 AFC Asian Cup
4.	9 December 1988	Suheim bin Hamad Stadium, Doha, Qatar	South Korea	2–3	2–3	1988 AFC Asian Cup

== Post-retirement ==
Salman works as an analyst for various Gulf sports channels, frequently for Al-Kass, where he appears in the Al Majlis talk show.

== Ambassador for 2022 FIFA World Cup ==
Salman was selected as one of the local ambassadors for 2022 FIFA World Cup and its legacy programmes.

=== Comments on homosexuality ===
During an interview with German television channel ZDF on 8 November 2022, Salman made comments about homosexuality, saying "during the World Cup, many things would come into the country. For example, let's talk about gays. The most important thing would be that everyone would accept that they come here. But they would have to accept our rules." Salman mentioned that he has problems with children seeing gay men. He argued that children would then learn something that would be not good. He said that being gay is "haram" or forbidden, and described homosexuality as a "damage in the mind". The interview was stopped by a World Cup organizing committee press officer. His comments led to massive criticism in Germany. However, Salman later stated that his comments were misinterpreted and that "damage in the mind" was in relation to alcohol and not homosexuality.
