= List of Al Sadd SC managers =

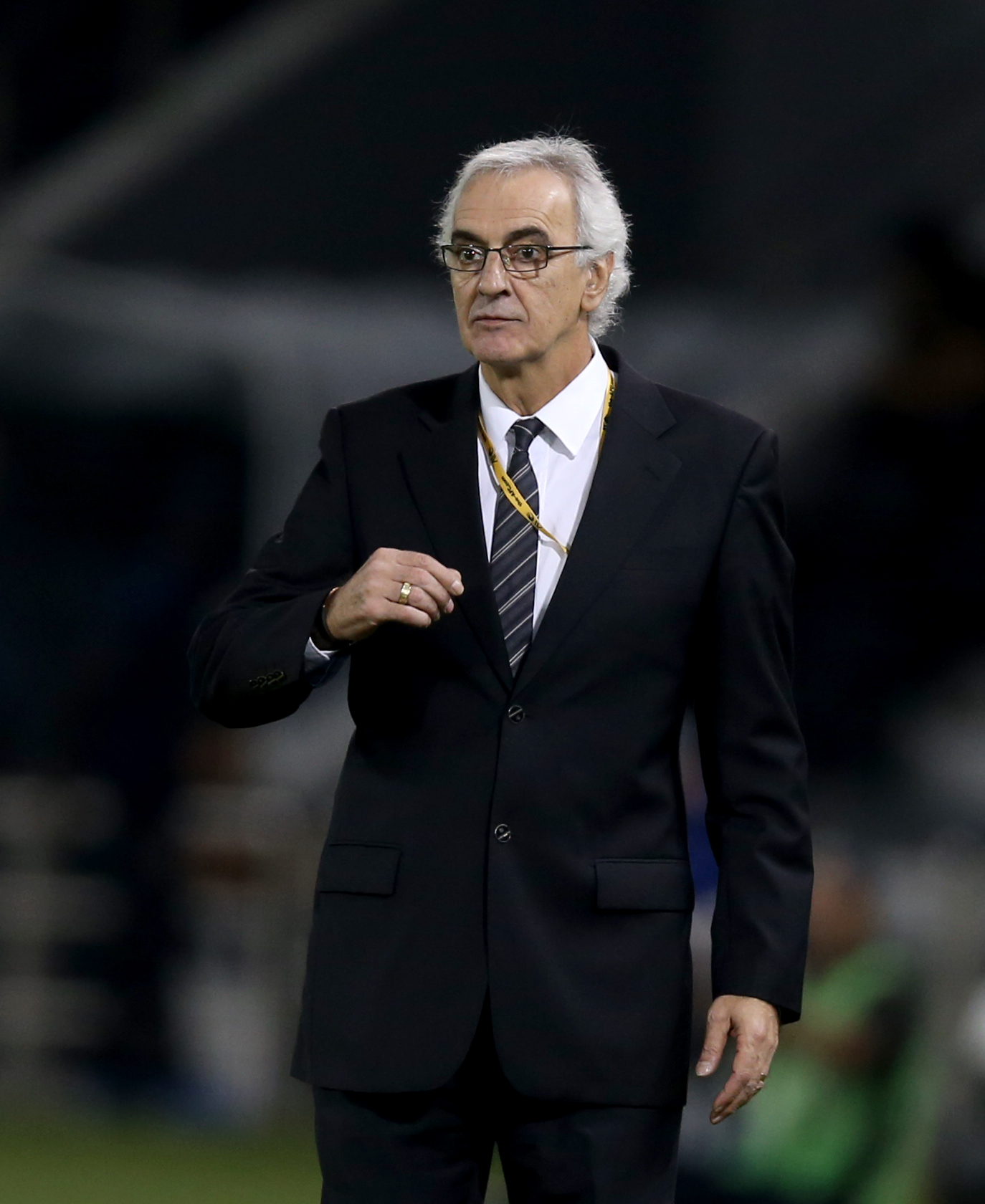
Jorge Fossati With Al Sadd SC won 6 titles, including a historical title in the AFC Champions League in 2011, and participated in the FIFA Club World Cup for the first time.

This is a list of all managers of Al Sadd SC. Since 1969 the first coach was Hamad Al Attiyah, and the first coach to achieve a title with him was the Sudanese Hassan Othman, and more than his coach was the Portuguese Jesualdo Ferreira for four seasons. Current coach Javi Gracia took over for Xavi on 8 December 2021.

== Background ==
The first to coach Al Sadd SC is Hamad Al Attiyah. It did not last long. In the mid-seventies with coaches from Sudan, including Hassan Othman for three years, to begin the stage of contracting with Brazilian coaches from the eighties until the end of the nineties, their number reached 14, most notably Zé Mário, Evaristo de Macedo and Procópio Cardoso, With the beginning of the millennium Al Sadd SC contracted with several coaches and there was no stability and from several nationalities. They are Džemaludin Mušović for the second time after the first season 1994–95, Luka Peruzović, Jorge Fossati, Ilie Balaci, Bora Milutinović, Émerson Leão, Cosmin Olăroiu, René Meulensteen, Co Adriaanse, and for the third time the Bosnian Mušović. On January 14, 2011 Al Sadd SC contracted with Jorge Fossati for the second time after the first in the 2006–07 season which was not successful, but in the second Fossati managed to lead him to win the 2011 AFC Champions League for the second time in its history after the first in 1988–89 to ensure a historic participation in the FIFA Club World Cup where they played against the giant FC Barcelona to occupy third place and guarantee a bronze medal, and at the end of the season after failing to win the 2011–12 Qatar Stars League and not guaranteeing participation in the AFC Champions League, Fossati officially left his post.

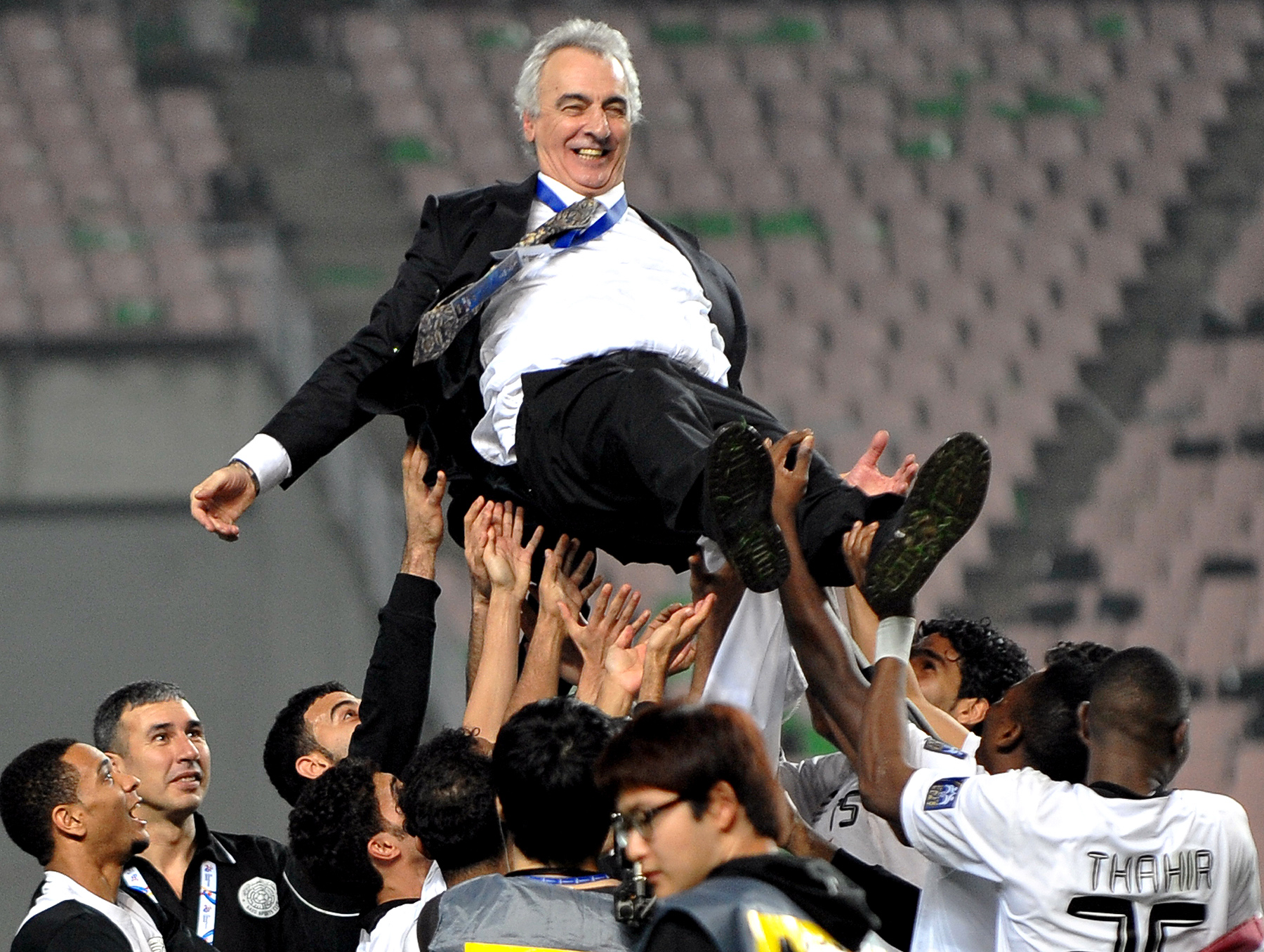
Fossati after winning AFC Champions League in 2011.

He was succeeded by Moroccan Hussein Ammouta where he spent more than three years during which Ammouta achieved four titles, His first test came in the 2012 Sheikh Jassem Cup. Al Sadd, playing most of their matches with their second team, achieved the runners-up position when they lost to Al Rayyan SC in the final. In the league, his team's form won the appraisal of many pundits, with them winning all of their first nine games, setting a new league record. Sadd were eventually held to a goalless draw by Al Kharaitiyat on 8 December 2012. Al-Sadd won the league on 13 April 2013, one match before the end of the league. It was the first Al-Sadd's championship since 2007. On 28 November 2015, Ferreira was named the head coach of Al Sadd SC, on a six-month deal with the option of a further year. Having won the 2018–19 Qatar Stars League with a game to play, he left the team in May and was replaced by Xavi. On 28 May 2019 it was announced that Xavi would take over as manager of Al Sadd on a two-year contract. Xavi helped the club reach the semi-finals of the AFC Champions League, where they were eliminated by Al-Hilal FC 6–5 on aggregate. In the league, the club finished third. In the 2019–20 season, Xavi led his team to win three domestic trophies, including the league and the Qatar Cup. In the 2020 AFC Champions League, Al Sadd reached the round of 16 but were eliminated 1–0 by Persepolis. During his 97 games in charge of Al Sadd, spanning two and a half years, he led the club to seven trophies. On 3 November 2021, Al Sadd drew 3–3 against Al-Duhail in his final game in-charge. Two days later Al Sadd announced Xavi's move to Barcelona after his release clause was paid.

== Managerial history ==
Years	Months	Manager
1969	Unknown	(Qatar) Hamad Al Attiyah^{1}
1969	Unknown	(Qatar) Said Musa^{1}
1969–73	Unknown	Unknown
1973–74	Unknown	(Qatar) Said Musa^{1}
1974	Unknown	(Sudan) Abdulla Balash
1974–77	Unknown	(Sudan) Hassan Othman
1977–79	Unknown	Unknown
1979–82	Unknown	(Brazil) José Faria
1982	Unknown	(Sudan) Hassan Othman
1982–83	Unknown	(England) Jimmy Meadows
1983–84	Unknown	(Brazil) Pepe
1984–85	Unknown	(Sudan) Hassan Othman
1985–87	Unknown	(Brazil) Procópio Cardoso
1987–88	Unknown	(Qatar) Ahmed Omar
1988–89	Unknown	(Brazil) José Carbone
1989	Unknown	(Qatar) Obeid Jumaa
1989	Unknown	(Brazil) José Carbone
1989–90	Unknown	(Brazil) Cabralzinho
1990–91	Unknown	(Brazil) Silas
1991–92	Unknown	(Qatar) Obeid Jumaa
1993	Unknown	(Brazil) Sebastião Lapola
1993–94	Unknown	(Qatar) Ahmed Omar
1994	Unknown	(Brazil) Flamarion Nunes
1994–95	Unknown	(Bosnia and Herzegovina) Džemaludin Mušović
1995	Unknown	(Qatar) Khalifa Khamis
1995–96	Unknown	(Brazil) Sebastião Rocha

Years	Months	Manager
1996–97	Unknown	(Qatar) Ahmed Omar
1997	Unknown	(Morocco) Abdelkadir Bomir
1997	Unknown	(Brazil) Evaristo de Macedo
1997	Unknown	(Brazil) Zé Mário
1997–98	Unknown	(Algeria) Rabah Madjer
1998–99	Unknown	(Morocco) Abdelkadir Bomir
1999	Unknown	(Brazil) Luiz Gonzaga^{2}
1999	Unknown	(Brazil) Evaristo de Macedo
1999	Unknown	(Iraq) Adnan Dirjal
1999–00	Unknown	(Brazil) Procópio Cardoso
2000	Unknown	(Bosnia and Herzegovina) Džemaludin Mušović
2000–01	July – Oct	(Netherlands) René Meulensteen
2001–02	Oct – Oct	(Romania) Ilie Balaci
2002–04	Oct – May	(Croatia) Luka Peruzović
2004–05	May – Oct	(Serbia) Bora Milutinović
2005–06	Oct – May	(Qatar) Mohammed Al Ammari
2006–07	May – Aug	(Uruguay) Jorge Fossati
2007–08	Aug – Jan	(Netherlands) Co Adriaanse
2008	Feb – June	(Morocco) Hassan Hormutallah
2008	June – Nov	(Brazil) Émerson Leão
2008–09	Nov – June	(Bosnia and Herzegovina) Džemaludin Mušović
2009–10	June – Dec	(Romania) Cosmin Olăroiu
2010–12	Dec – May	(Uruguay) Jorge Fossati
2012–15	June – Nov	(Morocco) Hussein Amotta
2015–19	Nov – May	(Portugal) Jesualdo Ferreira
2019–21	May – Nov	(Spain) Xavi
2021–	Nov –	(Spain) Javi Gracia

Notes

- Note 1 denotes player–manager role.
- Note 2 denotes caretaker role.

== List of managers ==
Information correct as of 27 April 2025. Only competitive matches are counted.

Key
*	Caretaker manager

Name	From	To	Matches	Won	Drawn	Lost	Win%
(Netherlands) René Meulensteen							100
(Romania) Ilie Balaci							100
(Croatia) Luka Peruzović							100
(Serbia) Bora Milutinović	2004	2005					100
(Qatar) Mohammed Al Ammari	October 2005	May 2006					100
(Uruguay) Jorge Fossati	22 December 2005	June 2007					100
(Netherlands) Co Adriaanse	27 August 2007	28 January 2008					100
(Morocco) Hassan Hormutallah							100
(Brazil) Émerson Leão	15 July 2008	25 November 2008					100
(Bosnia and Herzegovina) Džemaludin Mušović							100
(Romania) Cosmin Olăroiu	17 April 2009	23 December 2010					100
(Uruguay) Jorge Fossati	14 January 2011	May 2012	44	20	14	10	45.45
(Morocco) Hussein Amotta	1 June 2012	21 November 2015	152	87	35	30	57.24
(Portugal) Jesualdo Ferreira	24 November 2015	20 May 2019	129	80	26	23	62.02
(Spain) Xavi	28 May 2019	5 November 2021	102	67	17	18	65.69
(Spain) Javi Gracia	8 December 2021	18 June 2022	22	16	2	4	72.73
(Spain) Juan Manuel Lillo	18 June 2022	8 May 2023	32	20	2	10	62.5
(Portugal) Bruno Pinheiro	13 July 2023	16 November 2023	15	9	3	3	60
(Qatar) Wesam Rizik	25 November 2023	24 May 2024	21	14	4	3	66.67
(Spain) Félix Sánchez	23 July 2024	Present	33	21	5	7	63.64

== Trophies ==
#	Name	QSL	EQC	CPC	SJC	ACL	ACC	Total
1	(Uruguay) Jorge Fossati	1	1	2	1	1	-	6
1	(Spain) Xavi	1	2	2	1	-	-	6
1	(Sudan) Hassan Othman	1	4	-	1	-	-	6
4	(Morocco) Hussein Ammouta	1	2	-	1	-	-	4
4	(Brazil) Procópio Cardoso	2	1	-	1	-	-	4
4	(Qatar) Ahmed Omar	1	2	-	1	-	-	4
4	(Portugal) Jesualdo Ferreira	1	1	1	1	-	-	4
8	(Brazil) José Faria	2	-	-	1	-	-	3
8	(Croatia) Luka Peruzović	1	1	1	-	-	-	3
10	(Romania) Ilie Balaci	-	1	-	-	-	1	2
10	(Brazil) José Carbone	1	-	-	-	1	-	2
10	(Bosnia and Herzegovina) Džemaludin Mušović	1	1	-	-	-	-	2
10	(Qatar) Wesam Rizik	1	1	-	-	-	-	2
14	(Brazil) Cleyton Silas	-	1	-	-	-	-	1
14	(Netherlands) René Meulensteen	-	1	-	-	-	-	1
14	(Serbia) Bora Milutinović	-	1	-	-	-	-	1
14	(Morocco) Hassan Hormutallah	-	-	1	-	-	-	1
14	(Morocco) Abdelkadir Bomir	-	-	1	-	-	-	1

Bold = current manager
