= Badr Bilal =

Qatari footballer (born 1962)

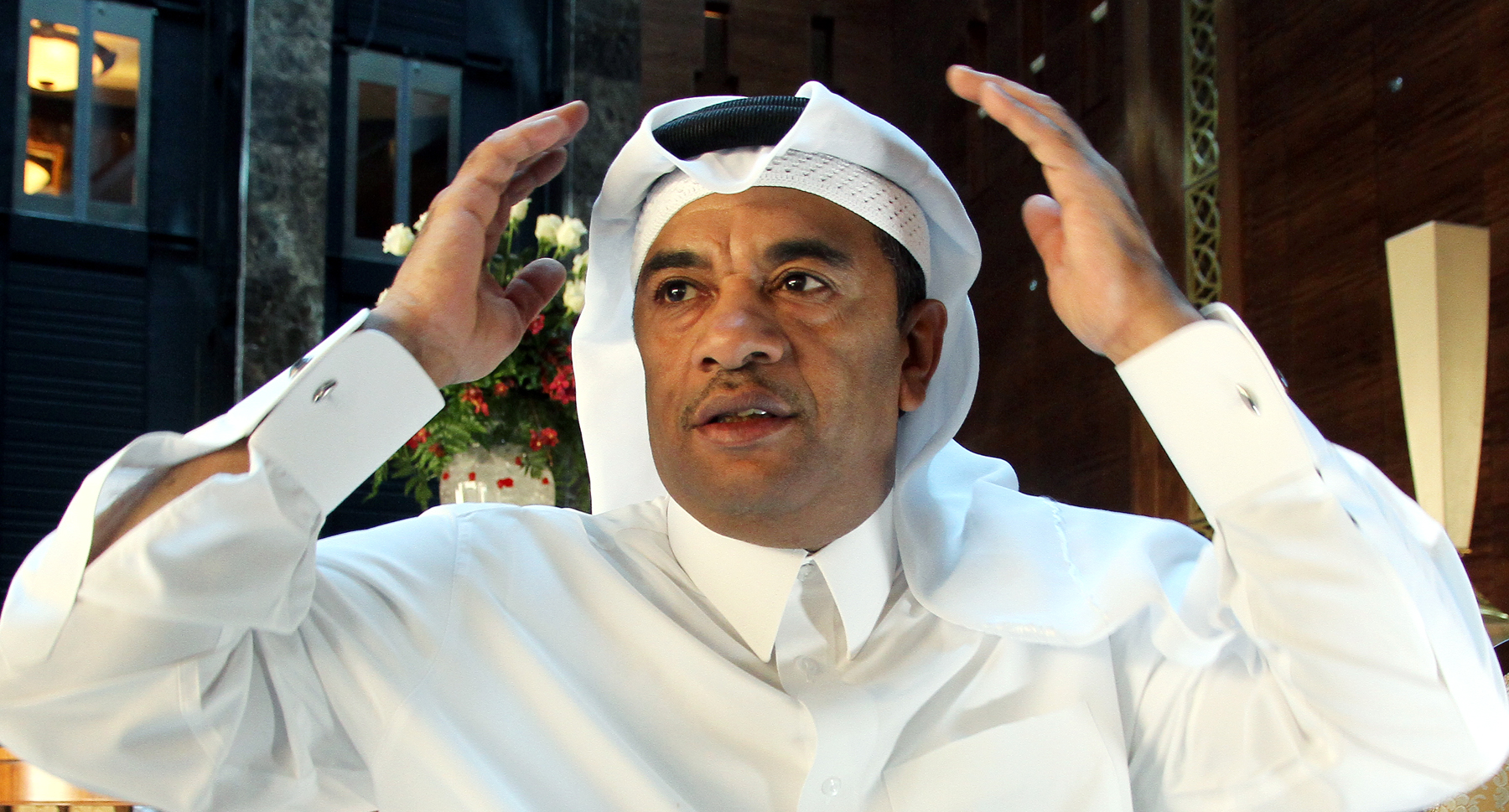
- Bilal in 2012

Personal information
- Full name: Badr Al-Majid Bilal Salem
- Date of birth: 4 November 1962 (age 63)
- Place of birth: Qatar
- Position: Striker

Youth career
- –1977: Al Sadd

Senior career*
Years	Team	Apps	(Gls)
1977–1991	Al Sadd		

International career
1981	Qatar U–20	6	(3)
1981–1986	Qatar	11	(2)
- * Club domestic league appearances and goals

Badr Bilal (Arabic: بدر بلال born 4 November 1962) is a Qatari former striker who played for Al Sadd. He is currently a sports analyst.

== Club career ==
Bilal started his career at Al Sadd in 1977. He rose through the ranks and eventually became a starter when he was a teenager. In 1979, he shared the top goal-scorer award in the 1979/80 season with 5 goals alongside Mansour Muftah, Sharif Abdul-Hamed, and Hamdan Hamed.

In 1982, he scored a crucial goal in the Emir Cup final that year while filling in for an injured Ali Behzad. He went on to win 23 official football championships with Al Sadd. Bilal also won the 1988–89 Asian Club Championship with Al Sadd against Al-Rasheed in the final, scoring several times throughout the tournament.

== International career ==
Due to his performances at Al Sadd, he was selected to play for the Qatar U–20 team which came runners-up in the 1981 FIFA Youth World Cup. During the tournament, he scored 3 goals in 6 matches. against Poland U-20 and USA U-20 in the group stage and also against England U-20 in the semi-finals.

Bilal would go on to represent Qatar national team in the 1980s, where he participated in the 1984 and 1986 editions of the Arabian Gulf Cup.

== Personal life ==
He has 9 children, Laila being the oldest and the youngest being Jassim, as well as Bilal, Mohammed, Khalifa, Aisha, Munira, Dana and Shahad.

== Legacy ==
Bilal was an instrumental player for Al Sadd throughout the 1980s and 1990s, alongside teammate Khalid Salman, they both helped the club win several domestic, international, tournaments. To honour his legacy, Aspire Zone Pitch 3 was named after him, for the FIFA U-17 World Cup held in Qatar.

== Honours ==
=== Club ===
- Al-Sadd
  - Qatari League (6): 1978–79, 1979–80, 1980–81, 1986–87, 1987–88, 1988–89
  - Emir Cup (6): 1977–78, 1981–82, 1984–85, 1985–86, 1987–88, 1990–91
    - Runners-up (2): 1982–83, 1986–87
  - Sheikh Jassim Cup (8): 1977, 1978, 1979, 1981, 1985, 1986, 1988, 1990
  - Asian Club Championship (1): 1988–89
  - Individual: Top goal-scorer (shared) – 1979–80, 5 goals

=== International ===
- FIFA World Youth Championship:
  - runners-up (1): 1981
