= Hassan Jawhar (footballer) =

Qatari footballer and referee

Personal information
- Full name: Hassan Jawhar Al-Ahmad
- Date of birth: Unknown
- Place of birth: Doha, Qatar
- Position: Striker

Senior career*
Years	Team	Apps	(Gls)
1980s	Al-Sadd		

International career
1986–1989	Qatar	6	(1)
- * Club domestic league appearances and goals

Hassan Jawhar, alternatively spelled as Hassan Johar (Arabic: حسن جوهر) is a Qatari former striker who played for Al Sadd throughout the 1980s.

== Club career ==
Jawhar played for Al-Sadd as a striker in the 1980s. Being awarded the Top goal-scorer of the league award in the 1987–88 season with 11 goals.

He also scored in the 1984–85 Emir Cup final against Al-Ahli. As well as in the 1985–86 Emir Cup final, defeating Al-Arabi 2–0.

== International career ==
Jawhar represented Qatar on the International stage from the years 1986 till 1987. Making his debut in the 1986 Gulf Cup against Saudi Arabia. He also played at the 1988 Gulf Cup, In the tournament, he scored a goal against Kuwait.

Jawhar's most notable moment came in the 1988 Olympics Football Qualification, where he scored against arch-rivals Saudi Arabia through a penalty at the 85th minute to win the game for Qatar.

== Post-retirement ==
After retiring, Jawhar went on to become a referee who officiated in Qatari League matches as well as the Emir Cup. Notably supervising the 1994–95 Emir Cup final between Al-Ittihad and Al-Rayyan.

== Honours ==
=== Al-Sadd ===
- Emir Cup:
  - Winners (2): 1984–85, 1985–86
- Qatari League:
  - Winners (2+): 1986–87, 1987–88, 1988–89
