= Mohammed Gholam =

Qatari footballer (born 1978)

Personal information
- Full name: Mohammed Gholam Al Baloushi
- Date of birth: February 19, 1978 (age 48)
- Place of birth: Qatar
- Height: 1.77 m (5 ft 10 in)
- Position: Midfielder

Team information
- Current team: Al Sadd (Sporting director)

Youth career
- 1986–1997: Al Sadd

Senior career*
Years	Team	Apps	(Gls)
1997–2010	Al Sadd	?	(6)

International career^{‡}
2000–2008	Qatar	27	(1)
- * Club domestic league appearances and goals as of December 10, 2006 ‡ National team caps and goals as of December 10, 2006

Mohammed Gholam (born February 19, 1978) is a Qatari former footballer. He currently serves as the sporting director of his lifelong club, Al Sadd.

== Club career ==
Mohammed spent his entire club career at Al-Sadd, starting from the youth setup in 1986, before breaking in to the first team in 1997.

The youngster went on to establish himself in the first team by the turn of the millennium, at a time in which another golden era began for the club. He went on to win numerous titles in a short span, which included the Qatari league shield after a 11-year gap, in addition to the club's first triumph at the Arab Club Champions Cup in 2001.

In 2003, Mohammed had the honour of scoring in two finals, as Al-Sadd went on to win the domestic cup double by winning the Heir Apparent Cup and the Amir Cup.

Quadruple

The biggest achievement of that era came in the 2006–07, when Al-Sadd completed the domestic quadruple, winning all the titles on offer: Sheikh Jassim Cup, Qatar Stars League, Heir Apparent Cup, and Amir Cup. Mohammed captained the team for a significant part of the season, including the latter two cup finals.

After lifting the Amir Cup title following a shootout victory over Al-Khor in the season-ending final, he said: "The success we have achieved this season was not a coincidence, but the result of a well-planned and executed strategy by the players and management over the entire season. The hard work and determination of everyone involved have led us to this historic day that will be cherished in the memories of the players, staff, and fans."

== Testimonial ==
On January 10, 2012, Al Sadd played Bundesliga side FC Schalke 04 in a testimonial friendly held in commemoration of Mohammed Gholam's career. A few former players flew in for the match, such as Felipe Jorge, who scored the winning goal for Al Sadd. Coincidentally, Mohammed scored Al Sadd's only goal against A.C. Milan in a 2–1 defeat in a farewell match for former club legend Jafal Rashed Al-Kuwari in 2009.

== International career ==
Mohammed's international career for Qatar started with the U17 level, earning the captain's armband and moving through the U19 and U23 teams, before being called up to the senior national team. He went on to appear in three AFC Asian Cup tournaments for Al-Annabi.

During his Asian Cup debut in 2000, at the 12th edition in Lebanon, Mohammed was given a start in the opening group stage game against Uzbekistan, and he scored his first international goal in the 60th minute. The game finished 1-1, after Mirjalol Qosimov equalised for Uzbekistan. Mohammed went on to start in the remaining two group games, against Saudi Arabia and Japan, both of which also ended in draws. Qatar qualified for the knockout stage of the competition for the first time as one of the best third-placed teams, and faced China in the quarterfinals. Mohammed started once again but Al-Annabi crashed out after a 3-1 defeat.

== Honours ==
=== Club ===
- Al Sadd

As player

  - Qatar Stars League: 4
  - Emir of Qatar Cup: 5
  - Heir Apparent Cup: 4
  - QFA Cup: 1
  - Joint Tournament: 1
  - Arab Champions League: 1
  - Reserve League / U23 League: 2

As administrator

  - Qatar Stars League: 4
  - Emir of Qatar Cup: 5
  - Heir Apparent Cup: 3
  - AFC Champions League: 1
  - FIFA Club World Cup Third Place: 1
  - Reserve League / U23 League: 3

=== Honours ===
  - The best football player (2002-2003)
  - The Falcon Sports Magazine Football Player (2002-2003)
  - Al Sadd Sports Club Player of the Year (1999-2000)
  - Best Asian player of the month May-2003

== Goals for Senior National Team ==
#	Date	Venue	Opponent	Score	Result	Competition
	August 20, 2008	Doha, Qatar	Tajikistan	5–0	Won	Friendly
