= Al Sadd SC =

Sports club in Qatar

Al-Sadd SC
- Full name: Al Sadd Sports Club
- Nicknames: Al Zaeem (The Boss); Al Dheeb (The Wolf); Malik Al Qulub (King of Hearts)
- Short name: SADD
- Founded: 21 October 1969 (57 years ago)
- Ground: Jassim bin Hamad Stadium
- Capacity: 15,000
- Chairman: Mohammed bin Khalifa Al Thani
- Head coach: Răzvan Lucescu
- League: Qatar Stars League
- 2025–26: Qatar Stars League, 1st of 12 (champions)
- Website: al-saddclub.com
| Home colours | Away colours | Third colours |

Al-Sadd Sports Club (Arabic: نادي السد الرياضي) is a Qatari sports club based in the Al-Sadd district of the capital city Doha. It is best known for its association football team, which competes in the top level of Qatari football, the Qatar Stars League. Locally, it is known primarily by the nickname "Al Zaeem", which translates to "The Leader". It is known as the best team in Qatar and is the only Qatari team that has won the AFC Champions League in Asia. In addition to football, the club has teams for handball, basketball, volleyball, table tennis, and athletics. Al Sadd is the most successful sports club in the country, and holds a national record of 64 official football championships.

The origin of Al Sadd's conception began with Al-Attiyah family members who excelled in football but did not wish to join any of the existing football clubs. After consulting the minister of Youth and Sports, the family, led by Ali Bin Hamad Al-Attiyah, decided to found the club on 21 October 1969 in Qatar's capital city, Doha.

In the 1989 season, they became the first Arab club side to triumph in the Asian Club Championship by defeating Al Rasheed of Iraq on an aggregate of away goals. Twenty-two years later, they won the 2011 AFC Champions League and earned a spot in the 2011 FIFA Club World Cup, in which Al Sadd finished third. They also earned a spot in the 2019 FIFA Club World Cup automatically as host club, in which Al Sadd finished sixth.

== History ==
=== 1969–1980: Foundation and beginnings ===
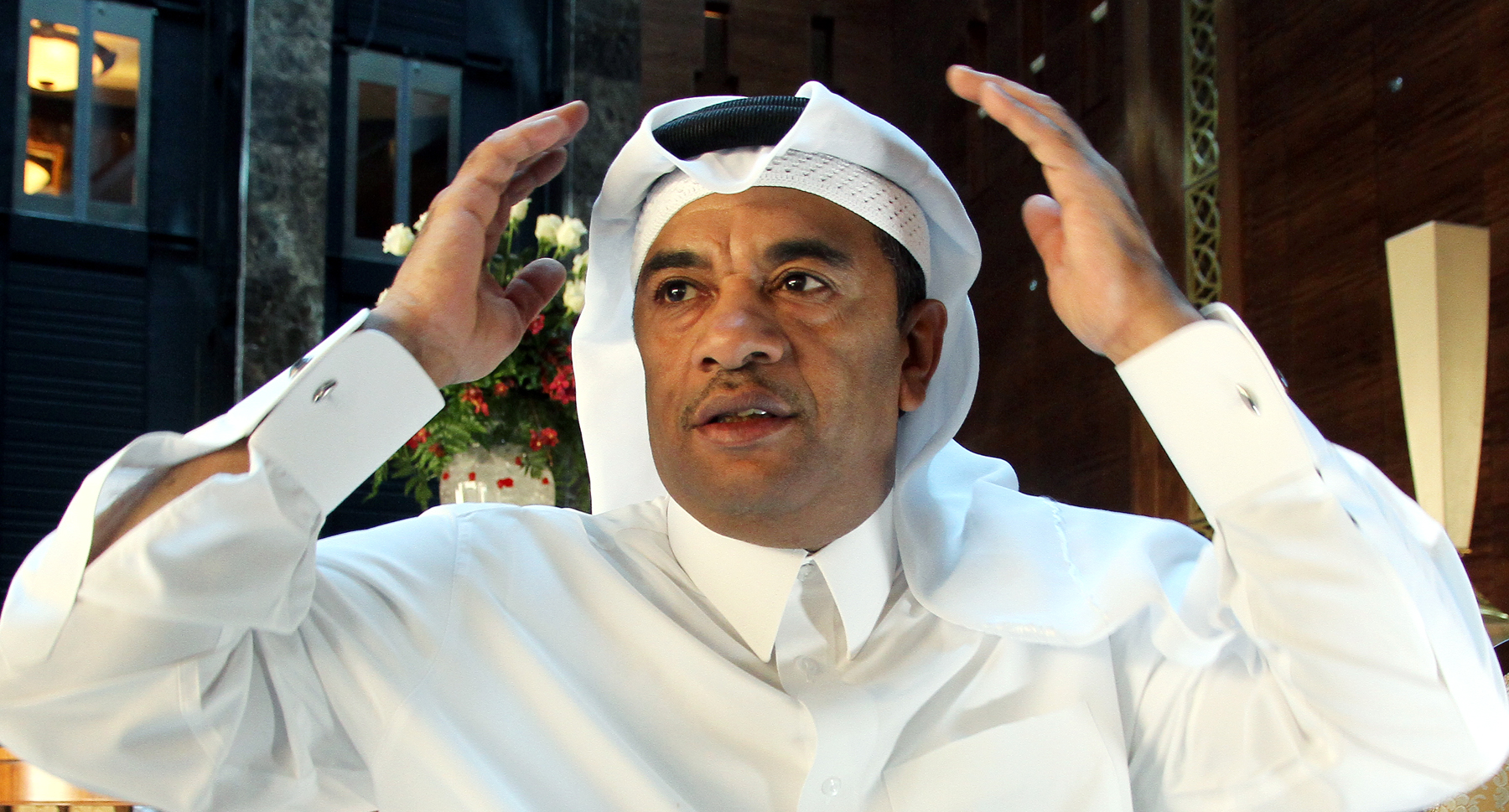
Badr Bilal played for the club from 1979 to 1991.

Al Sadd was established in 1969 by Ali bin Hamad Al Attiyah and his relatives; they excelled in playing football, and refused to join other clubs at the time and decided to make their own club. The reason behind the club's name is that Ali bin Hamad Al Attiyah was born and raised in the Al Sadd district of Doha.

They consulted with Jassim bin Hamad Al Thani, who was the minister of Youth and Sports at the time, at his residence on Al Rayyan Road. He obliged their request, and the next morning, the youth signed the necessary applications and created a club statue which they presented to Abdulaziz Buwazair, the operating manager of the Supreme Sports Committee, resulting in the formation of Al Sadd Sports Club.

Many of the early players and supporters were remnants of Al Ahrar SC, a club which was formed in 1961, also in the district of Al Sadd. The name "Al Ahrar" translates to "the free people", and was chosen to honor the Free Officers Movement led by Gamal Abdel Nasser. It was one of the several early football clubs in Qatar named in honor of a Pan-Arabism movement. By order of ministerial decree, Al Ahrar absorbed another Qatari football club named Al Nasr in 1964, retaining the name "Al "Ahrar". Playing its home matches at the Doha Stadium, Al Ahrar played numerous matches abroad in Saudi Arabia and Kuwait. Following a mass brawl between Al Ahrar and Al Najah in a 1967–68 Qatari League match attended by Jassim bin Hamad Al Thani, the sheikh decided to "permanently and immediately" shut down the club and redistribute its players to other teams, paving the way to the formation of Al Sadd's early squad. The main founder of Al Sadd, Ali bin Hamad Al Attiyah, states that he and the other founders watched all of Al Ahrar's matches as a youth, and that its closure inspired he and his friends to draft plans for their own team.

In their initial year of establishment, Hamad bin Mubarak Al Attiyah coached the club and the team trained on a football pitch in a local high school. Meanwhile, the founder of Al Sadd, Ali bin Hamad Al Attiyah, was overseeing the club's performance and making crucial decisions. Al Sadd's initial popularity was owed in part due to its affiliation with the Al Attiyah tribe, a prominent local tribe, and its close affiliation with then-recently dissolved Al Ahrar club.

The club won the first-ever league title in 1971–72. However, this was one year before the league was officially recognized. Thus, they won their first official QSL title in 1973–74. Sadd, along with Al Arabi and Al Rayyan, went on to dominate Qatari football in the 70s and the 80s by winning many Qatari League trophies and Emir Cups. Youssef Saad, a Sudanese forward who played for the club since its inception, was the first ever professional player to officially join the ranks of Al Sadd. In 1974, while Al Sadd was still in its infancy, they dubiously transferred 14 players, including Mubarak Anber and Hassan Mattar, and head coach Hassan Othman from Al Esteqlal (later to be known as Qatar SC), much to the dismay of club président Hamad bin Suhaim. Transfers could be made unconditionally during this time, meaning Esteqlal's protests were in vain. This was a major factor in them winning their first cup championship the next year in 1975. They defeated Al Ahli 4–3 in a tightly contested match under the leadership of Hassan Osman in order to claim the Emir Cup. Their goals came from Youssef Saad, who scored a brace, and Ali Bahzad and Abdullah Zaini. To this day, it is the joint-largest score in an Emir Cup final match.

They won the first ever Sheikh Jassim Cup held in 1977–78, as well as winning it two more times in the next two years. In 1978–79, the club succeeded in achieving their first domestic double by winning both, the Sheikh Jassim Cup and the league, accomplishing the same feat the next season.

=== 1980–2000: First international success ===
In 1981–82, they won the Emir Cup and Sheikh Jassim Cup, once again under the reigns of Hassan Othman. During this period, Badr Bilal and Hassan Mattar, both of whom were top scorers in the league at one point, led the team to victories in both of the finals. Al Sadd also succeeded in setting a domestic record by defeating Al-Shamal SC 16–2, the largest recorded win in a professional football match in the country's history. They nearly completed a domestic triple in 1987 but lost 2–0 to Al Ahli in the Emir Cup final that year.

They were the first team to play against English side Cheadle Town on their home grounds, Park Road Stadium, under the leadership of Jimmy Meadows in 1982. They were victorious by a 4–1 margin. In August 1985, Al Sadd shifted their headquarters to a new building equipped with modern furnishings and facilities.

Al Sadd won their Champions League debut in 1988 (then known as Asian Club Championship), where they secured the top position in their group. They faced Al-Rasheed of Iraq in the final, defeating them on away goals, thus fending the Iraqis off in order to claim the title of the first Arab team to ever win the championship. The victorious team was largely made up of locals, with the exception of Lebanese Wassef El Soufi and Iranian Amir Ghalenoei, who did not participate in the final due to the Iran–Iraq War. In addition to winning the Asian Champions League, they won the Sheikh Jassim Cup and the league on that year. They were the first team to play in Iran after the Iran–Iraq War, losing 1–0 to Esteghlal in an ACC match in 1991. The 1990s were a lean phase for Al Sadd regarding the league. They could not win even one league championship during that period. However, they did manage to open their account in the Heir Apparent Trophy and also won the Gulf Club Champions Cup in 1991.

=== 2000–2010: New century, new possibilities ===
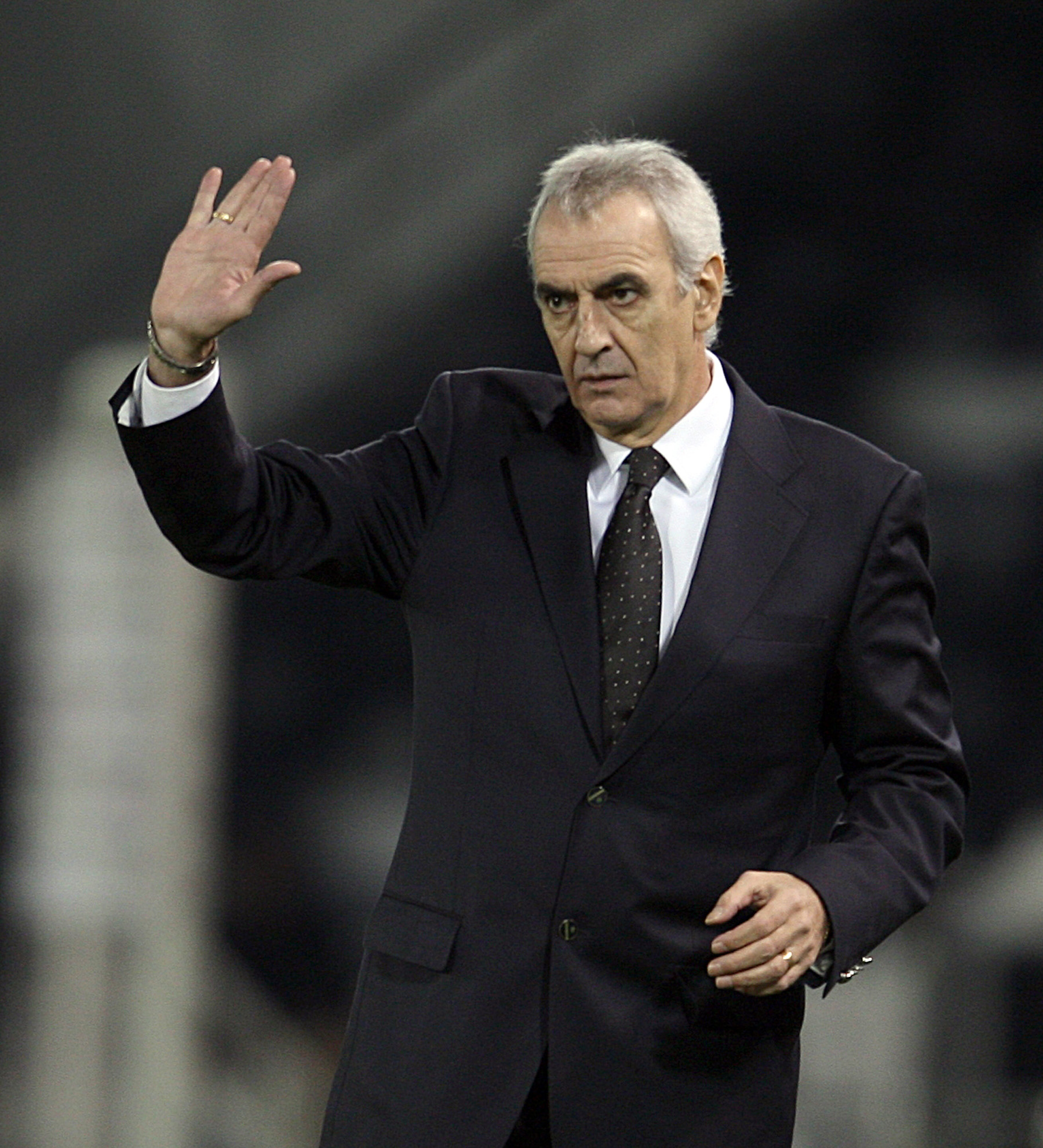
Fossati helped the club achieve a domestic quadruple.

The new millennium opened up a new era for Al Sadd. They returned to winning ways in the Qatari League, won many Emir Cups and Heir Apparent trophies. They also managed a triple crown in regional football by winning the Arab Champions League in 2001.

They recorded the largest-ever win in the Sheikh Jassim Cup in 2006, when they defeated Muaither 21–0. At the time, it was the largest victory margin ever recorded in any football match in the GCC.

In 2007, under the command of Uruguayan coach Jorge Fossati, they achieved a quadruple by winning all four domestic cups. They were the first Qatari team to do so, and also set a league record for the highest winning streak by winning 10 leagues games in a row. In addition, they made a record signing in Qatari football by paying $22 million for the Argentinian Mauro Zárate the same year. In 2010, they were the second team to ever win the QNB Cup by defeating Umm Salal in the final.

=== 2010–2012: Second Fossatti era ===
Al Sadd was placed in the qualifying play-offs of the 2011 Champions League, courtesy of the disqualification of Vietnamese teams due to the non-submission of documents. They beat Al-Ittihad of Syria and Indian club, Dempo SC, 5–1 and 2–0 respectively, to acquire a spot in the group stage. Al Sadd, who were the definite underdogs, overcame the odds and topped their group to play against Al-Shabab, whom they beat 1–0.

The quarter-final against Sepahan would mark the first sign of controversy for the club. Sepahan had initially won the first-leg match against Al Sadd 1–0; however, after the match, Al Sadd lodged a formal complaint to the AFC as Sepahan had fielded an ineligible player, Rahman Ahmadi, who previously received two yellow cards in the tournament with his former club. The match was overturned 3–0 in favor of Al Sadd, virtually ensuring the club a place in the semi-finals.

They later faced Suwon Samsung Bluewings in a highly publicized semi-final. Suwon were favorites to win after knocking last year's runners-up, Zob Ahan, out of the running. The first-leg match was played in Suwon, South Korea. In the 70th minute of the match, Mamadou Niang of Al Sadd had a deflected shot veer past the goalkeeper, settling the score 1–0. Ten minutes later, a Suwon player was inadvertently kicked in the head by an Al Sadd defender, prompting Suwon to kick the ball out of play. While the injured Suwon player was being tended to, Niang sprinted past the keeper to score a second goal, infuriating the Suwon players. The chaos was elevated when a Suwon fan had run onto the pitch, sparking a mass melee which involved both coaching staff and players. After the fight was brought to a halt, the referee sent off a player from each team while Niang later got a red card and Al Sadd's Korean defender Lee Jung-soo had walked off the pitch in frustration.

The melee prompted official investigation from the AFC, who suspended three players from both teams for six games. Al Sadd lost the second leg 1–0, though this allowed them to advance to the final with a 2–1 aggregate to face Jeonbuk Hyundai Motors. Al Sadd later received the nickname "Al-Badd" from the Korean media as a result of their semi-final confrontations.

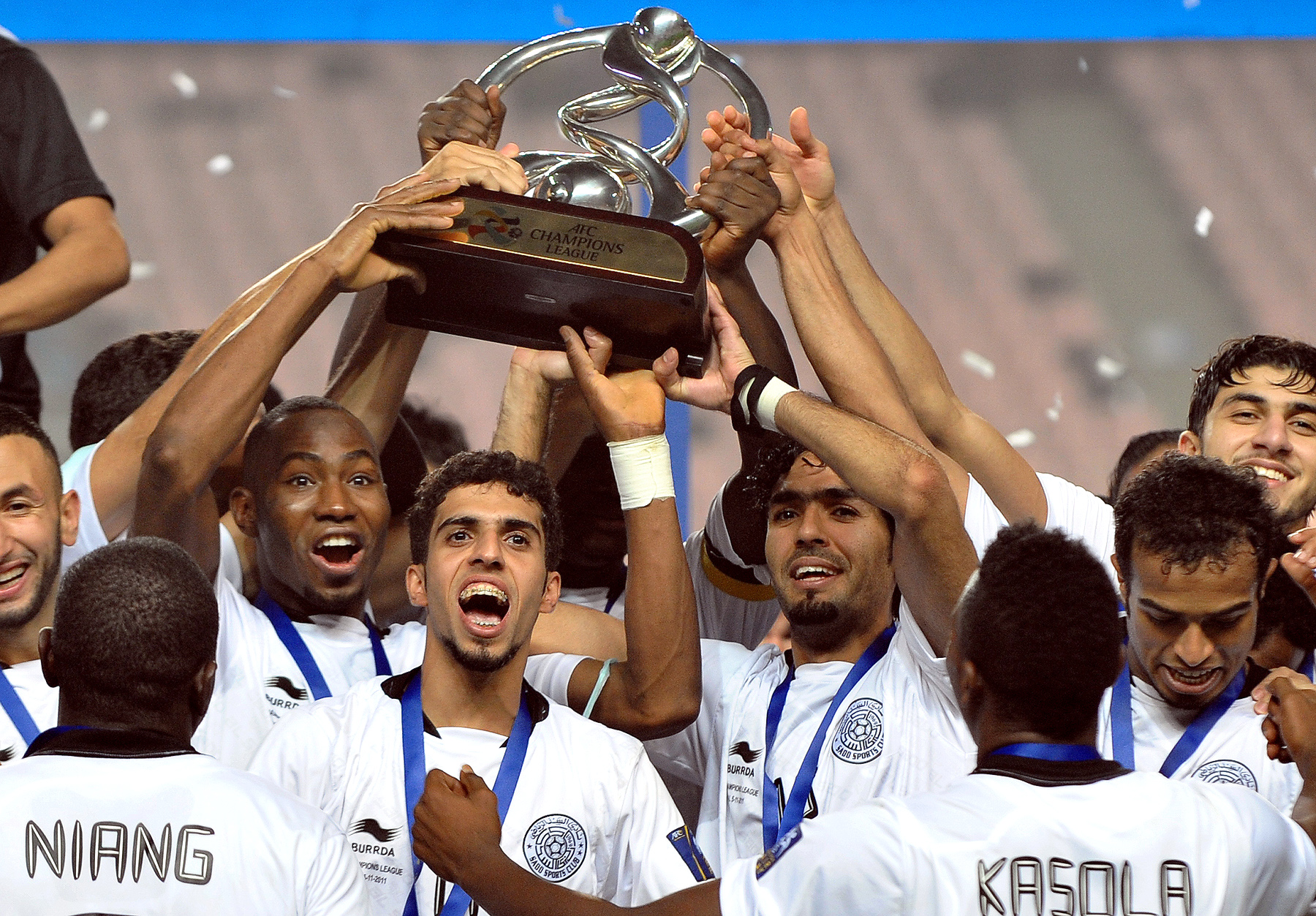
Al Sadd celebrate after winning 2011 AFC Champions League.

They won the 2011 AFC Champions League Final against Jeonbuk, 4–2 on penalties. This earned them a spot in the 2011 FIFA Club World Cup.

To date, this is the best result achieved by a Qatari team in the AFC Champions League under its new format. Al Sadd also became the first team to reach the AFC Champions League knockout stage after starting their campaign in the play-offs in February. Furthermore, Al Sadd was crowned "AFC Club of the Year" in 2011 by AFC after their Champions League conquest. Following their 2011 championship, in honor of the club's owner, the club modified their logo, adding two stars to commemorate their victories in the AFC Champions League in 1988 and 2011.

During the 2011 FIFA Club World Cup, Al Sadd was eliminated in the semi-final stage by Barcelona, which set up a third-place meeting between them and Kashiwa Reysol. This was the first time two clubs from the same confederation faced off each other in a third-place match. Al Sadd won the encounter on penalties to become the first West Asian club to claim the bronze medal in the FIFA Club World Cup.

=== 2012–present: Post-ACL champions ===
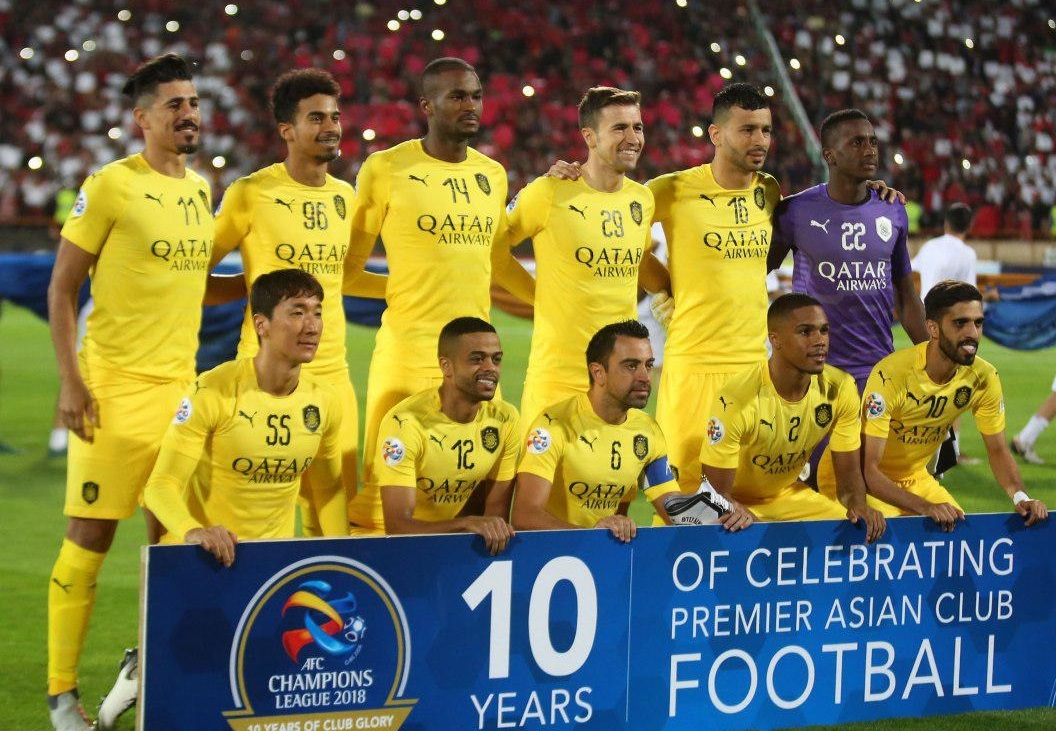
Al Sadd against Persepolis in 2018 AFC Champions League.

After the departure of Fossati, former Al Sadd midfielder Hussein Amotta was named as the new coach in May 2012. The Moroccan had finished as the Qatar League top scorer during his four-year stay at the club from 1997 to 2001. He was working as the club's technical director prior to being promoted to the top job.

Just days before Amouta's appointment, Al Sadd announced the high-profile signing of former Real Madrid captain Raúl, who arrived on a free transfer from Schalke 04.

Managed by Amouta and led by new captain Raúl, Al Sadd set a league record for the best start to the league season ever by winning all of their first nine games, shattering the previous record set by Al Gharafa, who had won seven. The team went on to break Lekhwiya's two-year dominance by winning the 2012–13 Qatar Stars League title, five years after their last triumph in the competition.

Xavi with 117 apps for Al Sadd.

Al Sadd faltered in the next two seasons, however, finishing third and second in 2013–14 and 2014–15 respectively, as Lekhwiya returned to win back-to-back titles once again. In 2015, Al Sadd achieved the coup of signing Barcelona's storied Spanish international Xavi. In 2019 he ended his career as a professional player at the club to start there his career as football manager.

With Qatar as the host of the 2019 FIFA Club World Cup when announced by the FIFA Council on 3 June 2019, Al Sadd automatically qualified as the host club team.

With Xavi as manager, Al Sadd won six cups and one championship title between 2019 and 2021. Xavi departed in 2021 to fill the managerial role at his boyhood club Barcelona.

== Stadium and facilities ==
Home matches are played in the state-of-the-art (football-specific) Jassim Bin Hamad Stadium (also known as Al Sadd Stadium), with a capacity which adds up to 18,000, including VIP stands. The stadium, originally built in 1974, was renovated in 2004 for the Gulf Cup. Situated near central Doha, the venue attracts large numbers of spectators. It is the de facto home stadium of the Qatar national football team.

Jassim Bin Hamad was one of the first stadiums to feature an air-conditioning system.

| Stadium | Period |
|---|---|
| Tariq bin Zayed Stadium | 1969–1975 |
| Jassim Bin Hamad Stadium | 1975–present |

== Colours and crest ==
Among Al Sadd's most popular nicknames are Al Zaeem (The Boss) and Al Dheeb (The Wolf). From the foundation of the club, the common home kit includes a white shirt, black or white shorts, and white socks. White and black colours are also seen in the crest. The away kit of the club is associated with a black background. Pink was adopted as the club's primary colour for their third uniform in 2007.

Their first crest was designed in Lebanon in 1969, and was similar to other football clubs in the region, in the sense that it depicted a football with Arabic writing on it. This crest was an homage to former football club Al Ahrar. Originally, the club wanted to use the same crest as Al Ahrar, but this idea was rejected by the QFA. A second crest was designed in the eighties, and was designed by the founder of the club, Nasser bin Mubarak Al-Ali. It was used until 1999, the year in which their third crest was designed, also by Nasser bin Mubarak Al-Ali, in celebration of the 30th anniversary of the founding of the club. Following their impressive AFC Champions League campaign in 2011, the logo was modified and released in June 2012 to include two golden stars on the top to mark the two Asian titles of 1989 and 2011. The fourth and current crest, a minimalistic version symbolic of a new direction for the club, was unveiled in 2019 and first saw use in the 2020-21 season.

=== Kit suppliers and shirt sponsors ===
| Period | Kit manufacturer | Shirt sponsor |
|---|---|---|
| 2009–2016 | (Switzerland) Burrda | Vodafone |
| 2017–2022 | (Germany) Puma | Qatar Airways |
| 2022–present | (United States) New Balance | Qatar Airways |

== International club twinnings ==
| Country | Club | From | Ref. |
|---|---|---|---|
| (Saudi Arabia) | Al-Hilal | 2010 | |
| (Egypt) | Zamalek | 2012 | |
| (Sudan) | Al-Hilal | 2014 | |
| (Germany) | Schalke 04 | 2015 | |
| (Turkey) | Trabzonspor | 2017 | |

== Youth development ==
The club hosts numerous age brackets with a number of youth coaches. Many notable local footballers have graduated from Al Sadd's academy, including Jafal Al Kuwari, Khalid Salman, Hassan Al-Haydos, and 2006 Asian Footballer of the Year, Khalfan Ibrahim, who is the first Qatari to receive this award. There have been foreign graduates as well, such as UAE's Mutaz Abdulla. They have a youth development programme, which instills philosophies and enforces training ideals among the youth players. The programme had 284 participants enrolled as of 2011.

== Performance in domestic competitions ==
| No. | Season | Opponent | Result | Scorer(s) | Head coach |
Emir Cup
| 1 | 1974 | Qatar SC | 1–2 | Youssef Saad | (Qatar) Said Musa |
| 2 | 1975 | Al Ahli | 4–3 | Youssef Saad (2), Ali Behzad, Abdulla Zaini | (Sudan) Hassan Othman |
| 3 | 1977 | Al Rayyan | 1–0 | Ali Behzad | (Sudan) Hassan Othman |
| 4 | 1982 | Al Rayyan | 2–1 | Badr Bilal, Hassan Mattar | (Sudan) Hassan Othman |
| 5 | 1983 | Al Arabi | 0–1 | N/A | (England) Jimmy Meadows |
| 6 | 1985 | Al Ahli | 2–1 | Hassan Jawhar, Khalid Salman | (Sudan) Hassan Othman |
| 7 | 1986 | Al Arabi | 2–0 | Khalifa Khamis, Hassan Jawhar | (Brazil) Procópio Cardoso |
| 8 | 1987 | Al Ahli | 0–2 | N/A | (Brazil) Procópio Cardoso |
| 9 | 1988 | Al Wakrah | 0–0 (4–3 pen.) | Yousef Adsani, Ebrahim Ghasempour, Salah Salman, Mohammed Al Ammari | (Qatar) Ahmed Omar |
| 10 | 1991 | Al Rayyan | 1–0 | Ali Abdel Razak | (Brazil) Cleyton Silas |
| 11 | 1993 | Al Arabi | 0–3 | N/A | (Brazil) Sebastião Lapola |
| 12 | 1994 | Al Arabi | 3–2 | Isaac Debra (2), Khalid Al Merreikhi | (Qatar) Ahmed Omar |
| 13 | 2000 | Al Rayyan | 2–0 | Diène Faye, Ezzat Jadoua | (Bosnia and Herzegovina) Džemaludin Mušović |
| 14 | 2001 | Qatar SC | 3–2 | Ahmed Khalifa, Radhi Shenaishil, Ali Benarbia | (Netherlands) René Meulensteen |
| 15 | 2002 | Al Gharafa | 1–4 | Jafal Rashed | (Romania) Ilie Balaci |
| 16 | 2003 | Al Ahli | 2–1 | Mohammed Gholam (2) | (Croatia) Luka Peruzović |
| 17 | 2005 | Al Wakrah | 0–0 (5–4 pen.) | N/A | (Serbia) Bora Milutinović |
| 18 | 2007 | Al Khor | 0–0 (5–4 pen.) | N/A | (Uruguay) Jorge Fossati |
| 19 | 2012 | Al Gharafa | 0–0 (3–4 pen.) | N/A | (Uruguay) Jorge Fossati |
Crown Prince Cup
| 1 | 1998 | Al Arabi | 3–2 | Sérgio (2), Hussein Amotta | (Morocco) Abdelkader Youmir |
| 2 | 2003 | Al Gharafa | 2–0 | Zamel Al Kuwari, Mohammed Gholam | (Croatia) Luka Peruzovic |
| 3 | 2004 | Qatar SC | 1–2 | Medhat Mostafa (o.g.) | (Serbia) Bora Milutinovic |
| 4 | 2006 | Qatar SC | 2–1 | Carlos Tenorio, Emerson Sheik | (Uruguay) Jorge Fossati |
| 5 | 2007 | Al Gharafa | 2–1 | Carlos Tenorio (2) | (Uruguay) Jorge Fossati |
| 6 | 2008 | Al Gharafa | 1–0 | Carlos Tenorio | (Morocco) Hassan Hormutallah |
| 7 | 2012 | Al Rayyan | 1–1 (4–5 pen.) | Khalfan Ibrahim | (Uruguay) Jorge Fossati |
| 8 | 2013 | Lekhwiya | 2–3 | Younis Mahmoud, Lee Jung-Soo | (Morocco) Hussein Amotta |

== Players ==
Note: Flags indicate national team as defined under FIFA eligibility rules; some limited exceptions apply. Players may hold more than one non-FIFA nationality.

| No. | Pos. | Nation | Player |
|---|---|---|---|
| 1 | GK | QAT | Saad Al-Sheeb |
| 2 | DF | QAT | Pedro Miguel |
| 3 | DF | FRA | Younes El Hannach |
| 4 | MF | MLI | Mohamed Camara |
| 5 | DF | QAT | Tarek Salman |
| 6 | DF | BRA | Paulo Otávio |
| 7 | MF | QAT | Mohammed Waad |
| 8 | MF | QAT | Guilherme Torres |
| 9 | FW | BRA | Roberto Firmino |
| 10 | MF | QAT | Hassan Al-Haydos (captain) |
| 11 | FW | BRA | Giovani |
| 12 | FW | QAT | Yusuf Abdurisag |
| 13 | DF | QAT | Abdullah Al-Yazidi |
| 14 | MF | QAT | Mostafa Meshaal |
| 15 | MF | QAT | Anas Abweny |
| 16 | DF | QAT | Boualem Khoukhi |

| No. | Pos. | Nation | Player |
|---|---|---|---|
| 17 | MF | QAT | Mohamed Manai |
| 18 | DF | QAT | Abdulrahman Bakri |
| 19 | FW | ESP | Rafa Mújica |
| 20 | DF | ALG | Youcef Atal |
| 21 | DF | ALG | Abdessamed Bounacer |
| 22 | GK | QAT | Meshaal Barsham |
| 23 | MF | QAT | Hashim Ali |
| 26 | DF | ITA | Alessio Romagnoli |
| 30 | FW | QAT | Akram Afif |
| 31 | GK | QAT | Youssef Baliadeh |
| 32 | GK | QAT | Karim Haider |
| 33 | MF | BRA | Claudinho |
| 64 | MF | QAT | Moaz El-Wadie |
| 77 | MF | CRO | Marcelo Brozović |
| 80 | MF | URU | Agustín Soria |
| — | FW | ESP | Cristo González |

=== Out on loan ===
Note: Flags indicate national team as defined under FIFA eligibility rules; some limited exceptions apply. Players may hold more than one non-FIFA nationality.

| No. | Pos. | Nation | Player |
|---|---|---|---|
| 37 | DF | QAT | Ahmed Suhail (at Al-Shamal) |
| 40 | MF | QAT | Yamaan Jarrar (at Qatar U23) |
| 68 | MF | QAT | Zaid Burhan (at Qatar U23) |
| — | GK | QAT | Abubaker Osman (at Qatar U23) |

| No. | Pos. | Nation | Player |
|---|---|---|---|
| — | DF | QAT | Rashid Muneer (at Qatar U23) |
| — | MF | QAT | Bassam Eid (at Qatar U23) |
| — | MF | ESP | Pau Prim (at Qatar) |
| — | FW | BRA | Lucão (at Al-Shahaniya) |

== Staff ==
As of 5 July 2026

Coaching staff
| Head coach | (Romania) Răzvan Lucescu |
| Assistant coach | (Romania) Nicolae Constantin (Italy) Gianpaolo Castorina |
| Goalkeeper coach | (Italy) Giorgio Bianchi |
| Athletic coach | (Italy) Giacomo Ceci |
| Fitness coach | (Italy) Matteo Spatafora |
| Video Analyst | (Italy) Christian Venturini |
| Technical Analyst | (Algeria) Samir Brixi |
| U23 team coach | (Qatar) Abbas Abdulghani |
| U23 team assistant coach | (Qatar) Hamad Thamer |
Medical staff
| Team doctor | (Morocco) Aladdin Rahali |
| Physiotherapist | (Tunisia) Akram Abid (Tunisia) Raouf Bougamra (Spain) Héctor García |
| Medical Therapist | (Brazil) Gore Pereira |
| Medical Therapist | (Brazil) Jefferson Gomes |
Administrative staff
| Director of football | (Qatar) Mohammed Al Ali |
| Sporting director | (Qatar) Mohammed Gholam |
| Media officer | (Qatar) Ahmad Al Ansari |
| Team manager | (Qatar) Abdulla Al Berik |
| First team officer | (Qatar) Mohammed Saeed |
| U23 team manager | (Qatar) Abdulaziz Al Jaiedi |
| Audience & marketing officer | (Qatar) Ahmed Al Sayed |

== Honours ==
Domestic

- Qatar Stars League
  - Winners (19) (record): 1971–72, 1973–74, 1978–79, 1979–80, 1980–81, 1986–87, 1987–88, 1988–89, 1999–2000, 2003–04, 2005–06, 2006–07, 2012–13, 2018–19, 2020–21, 2021–22, 2023–24, 2024–25, 2025–26
- Amir of Qatar Cup
  - Winners (19) (record): 1974–75, 1977–78, 1981–82, 1984–85, 1985–86, 1987–88, 1990–91, 1993–94, 1999–2000, 2000–01, 2002–03, 2004–05, 2006–07, 2014, 2015, 2017, 2020, 2021, 2024
  - Runners-up (11): 1973–74, 1982–83, 1986–87, 1992–93, 2001–02, 2012, 2013, 2016, 2019, 2023, 2026
- Qatar Cup
  - Winners (9) (record): 1998, 2003, 2006, 2007, 2008, 2017, 2020, 2021, 2025
  - Runners-up (4): 2004, 2012, 2013, 2018
- Qatar Super Cup / Sheikh Jassim Cup
  - Winners (15) (record): 1977, 1978, 1979, 1981, 1985, 1986, 1988, 1990, 1997, 1999, 2001, 2006, 2014, 2017, 2019
  - Runners-up (2): 2012, 2015
- Qatari Stars Cup
  - Winners (2): 2010, 2019
  - Runners-up (1): 2013–14

Continental

- AFC Champions League Elite
  - Winners (2): 1988–89, 2011
- Asian Cup Winners' Cup
  - Third place (1): 2001–02
- Arab Champions League
  - Winners (1): 2001
- Arab Cup Winners' Cup
  - Runners-up (1): 1992
- GCC Champions League
  - Winners (1): 1991
- Qatar-UAE Super Shield
  - Winners (1): 2026

International

- Trofeo Santiago Bernabéu
  - Runners-up (1): 2013
- FIFA Club World Cup
  - Bronze Medalist (1): 2011
    - Qualified as host: 2019
- Afro-Asian Club Championship
  - Runners-up (1): 1989

== Records ==
=== Club ===
==== Matches ====
- Largest victory: Al Sadd 21–0 Muaither (2006–07)
- Longest winning run: 9 matches (2011–12) (Record)
- Largest Asian victory: Al Sadd 6–2 Lokomotiv (2014–15)
- Largest Asian defeat: Al Hilal 5–0 Al Sadd (2013–14)

==== Individual ====
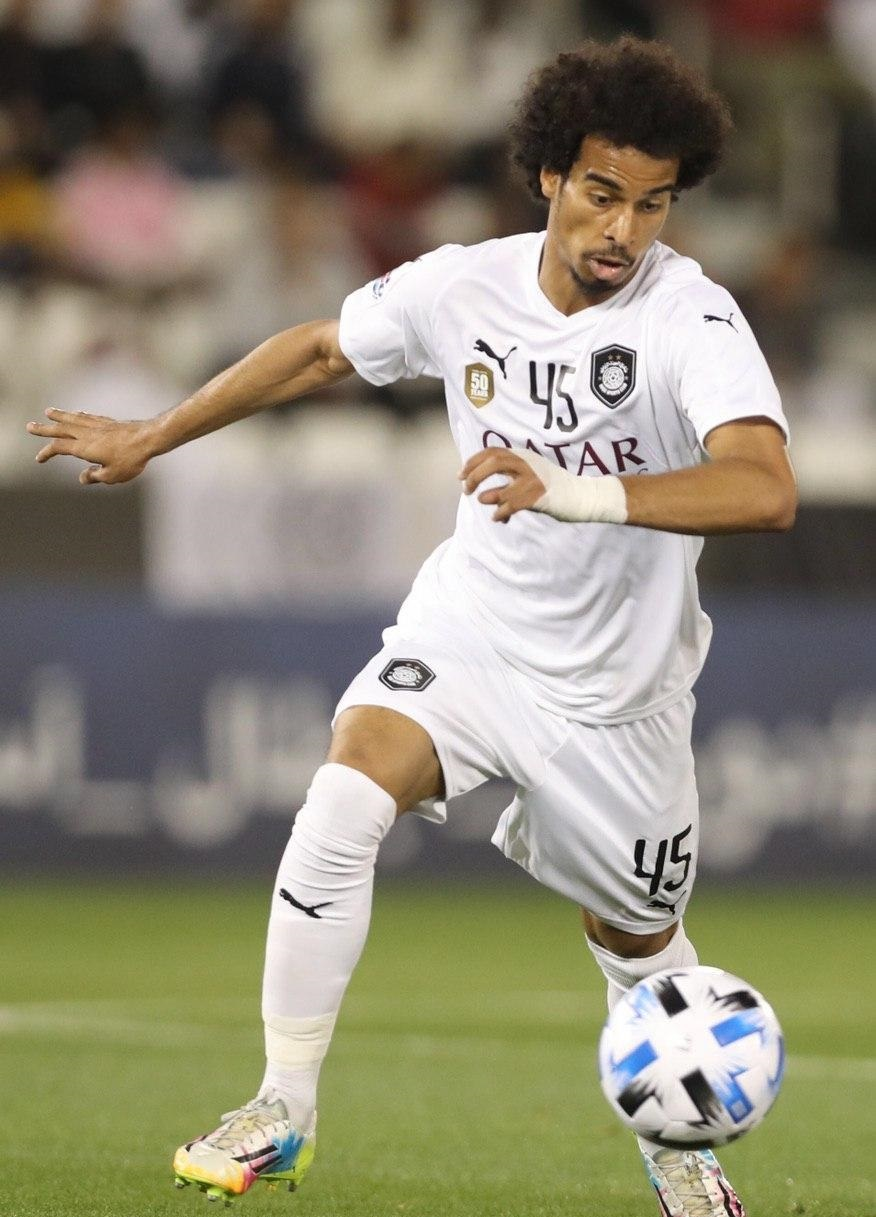
Akram Afif with Al Sadd

Qatar Stars League Top scorers

The following players have won the QSL top goalscorer award while playing for Al Sadd:
- Hassan Mattar – 1979, 1981
- Badr Bilal – 1980
- Hassan Jowhar – 1988
- Hussein Amotta – 1998
- Carlos Tenorio – 2006
- Baghdad Bounedjah – 2019, 2021
- Akram Afif – 2020

=== Players ===
As of 7 December 2024.

Notes: Early years statistics are primarily unknown.
Names in bold are players who are still at the club at present.

==== All-time top goalscorers ====
| Rank | Nation | Name | Years | Goals |
|---|---|---|---|---|
| 1 | Algeria | **Baghdad Bounedjah** | 2016–2024 | 219 |
| 2 | Qatar | **Akram Afif** | 2018– | 136 |
| 3 | Qatar | **Hassan Al-Haydos** | 2007– | 134 |
| 4 | Ecuador | Carlos Tenorio | 2003–2009 | 104 |
| 5 | Qatar | Khalfan Ibrahim | 2004–2017 | 104 |
| 6 | Qatar | Yusef Ahmed | 2005–2015 | 54 |
| 7 | Qatar | Emerson Sheik | 2005–2007; 2008–2009 | 50 |
| 8 | Brazil | Leandro Montera | 2009–2012 | 50 |
| 9 | Morocco | Hussein Amotta | 1997–2001 | 49 |
| 10 | Brazil | Felipe Jorge | 2005–2010 | 40 |

==== All-time most appearances ====
| Rank | Nation | Name | Years | Apps |
|---|---|---|---|---|
| 1 | Qatar | **Hassan Al-Haydos** | 2007– | 492 |
| 2 | Qatar | Abdulla Koni | 1996–2014 | 342 |
| 3 | Qatar | Khalfan Ibrahim | 2004–2017 | 316 |
| 4 | Qatar | Abdelkarim Hassan | 2010– | 312 |
| 5 | Qatar | Mohamed Saqr | 2003–2012 | 287 |
| 7 | Qatar | Talal Al-Bloushi | 2003–2017 | 286 |
| 6 | Qatar | **Saad Al-Sheeb** | 2008– | 280 |
| 8 | Qatar | Mubarak Anber | 1975–1987 | 246 |
| 9 | Qatar | Jafal Rashed Al-Kuwari | 1990–2009 | 245 |
| 10 | Qatar | Mesaad Al-Hamad | 2004–2014 | 239 |

== Noted players ==
Updated 20 May 2019.

This list includes players whom have made significant contributions to their national team and to the club. At least 100 caps for either the national team or club is needed to be considered for inclusion.

Players with significant contributions to club or country
| Player | Nationality | Int. caps / goals | Club caps / goals |
|---|---|---|---|
| Mubarak Anber | Qatar | 100+ (?) | 246 (?) |
| Abdulla Koni | Qatar | 38 (3) | 222 (13) |
| Mohamed Saqr | Qatar | 79 (0) | 185 (0) |
| Mesaad Al-Hamad | Qatar | 44 (0) | 149 (4) |
| Wesam Rizik | Qatar | 101 (9) | 145(16) |
| Talal Al-Bloushi | Qatar | 64 (40) | 142 (3) |
| Khalfan Ibrahim | Qatar | 54 (17) | 130 (45) |
| Dahi Al Naemi | Qatar | 32 (3) | 124 (2) |
| Ali Afif | Qatar | 20 (12) | 123 (33) |
| Felipe Jorge | Brazil | 7 (0) | 107 (45) |
| Raúl | Spain | 102 (44) | 34 (10) |
| Ali Daei | Iran | 149 (109) | 16 (10) |
| Younis Mahmoud | Iraq | 148 (57) | 7 (2) |
| Xavi | Spain | 133 (13) | 115 (23) |

Former captains
| Player | Nationality | Trophies |
|---|---|---|
| Obeid Jumaa | Qatar | Emir Cup: 1975 |
| Mubarak Anber | Qatar | Emir Cup: 1977, 1982, 1985, 1986 |
| Yousef Al Adsani | Qatar | Emir Cup: 1988, 1991; Asian Club Championship:1989 |
| Khalid Salman | Qatar | Emir Cup: 1994 |
| Abdulnasser Al-Obaidly | Qatar | Crown Prince Cup: 1998; Emir Cup: 2000, 2001 |
| Jafal Al Kuwari | Qatar | Emir Cup: 2003, 2005, 2007 |
| Felipe Jorge | Brazil | Crown Prince Cup: 2008 |
| Abdulla Koni | Qatar | AFC Champions League: 2011 |
| Raúl | Spain | Emir Cup: 2014 |
| Talal Al-Bloushi | Qatar | Super Cup: 2014; Emir Cup: 2015 |
| Xavi | Spain | League: 2019; Super Cup: 2017; Emir Cup: 2017 |

== Managerial history ==
As of November 2025.

| Years | Months | Manager |
|---|---|---|
| 1969 | Unknown | (Qatar) Hamad Al Attiyah^{1} |
| 1969 | Unknown | (Qatar) Said Musa^{1} |
| 1969–73 | Unknown | Unknown |
| 1973–74 | Unknown | (Qatar) Said Musa^{1} |
| 1974 | Unknown | (Sudan) Abdulla Balash |
| 1974–77 | Unknown | (Sudan) Hassan Othman |
| 1977–79 | Unknown | Unknown |
| 1979–82 | Unknown | (Brazil) José Faria |
| 1982 | Unknown | (Sudan) Hassan Othman |
| 1982–83 | Unknown | (England) Jimmy Meadows |
| 1983–84 | Unknown | (Brazil) Pepe |
| 1984–85 | Unknown | (Sudan) Hassan Othman |
| 1985–87 | Unknown | (Brazil) Procópio Cardoso |
| 1987–88 | Unknown | (Qatar) Ahmed Omar |
| 1988–89 | Unknown | (Brazil) José Carbone |
| 1989 | Unknown | (Qatar) Obaid Juma |
| 1989 | Unknown | (Brazil) José Carbone |
| 1989–90 | Unknown | (Brazil) Cabralzinho |
| 1990–91 | Unknown | (Brazil) Silas |
| 1991–92 | Unknown | (Qatar) Obaid Juma |
| 1993 | Unknown | (Brazil) Sebastião Lapola |
| 1993–94 | Unknown | (Qatar) Ahmed Omar |
| 1994 | Unknown | (Brazil) Flamarion Nunes |
| 1994–95 | Unknown | (Bosnia and Herzegovina) Džemaludin Mušović |
| 1995 | Unknown | (Qatar) Khalifa Khamis |
| 1995–96 | Unknown | (Brazil) Sebastião Rocha |
| 1996–97 | Unknown | (Qatar) Ahmed Omar |

| Years | Months | Manager |
|---|---|---|
| 1997 | Unknown | (Morocco) Abdelkader Youmir |
| 1997 | Unknown | (Brazil) Evaristo de Macedo |
| 1997 | Unknown | (Brazil) Zé Mário |
| 1997–98 | Unknown | (Algeria) Rabah Madjer |
| 1998–99 | Unknown | (Morocco) Abdelkader Youmir |
| 1999 | Unknown | (Brazil) Luiz Gonzaga^{2} |
| 1999 | Unknown | (Brazil) Evaristo de Macedo |
| 1999 | Unknown | (Iraq) Adnan Dirjal |
| 1999–00 | Unknown | (Brazil) Procópio Cardoso |
| 2000 | Unknown | (Bosnia and Herzegovina) Džemaludin Mušović |
| 2000–01 | July – Oct | (Netherlands) René Meulensteen |
| 2001–02 | Oct – Oct | (Romania) Ilie Balaci |
| 2002–04 | Oct – May | (Croatia) Luka Peruzović |
| 2004–05 | May – Oct | (Serbia) Bora Milutinović |
| 2005–06 | Oct – May | (Qatar) Mohammed Al Ammari |
| 2006–07 | May – Aug | (Uruguay) Jorge Fossati |
| 2007–08 | Aug – Jan | (Netherlands) Co Adriaanse |
| 2008 | Feb – June | (Morocco) Hassan Hormutallah |
| 2008 | June – Nov | (Brazil) Émerson Leão |
| 2008–09 | Nov – June | (Bosnia and Herzegovina) Džemaludin Mušović |
| 2009–10 | June – Dec | (Romania) Cosmin Olăroiu |
| 2010–12 | Dec – May | (Uruguay) Jorge Fossati |
| 2012–15 | June – Nov | (Morocco) Hussein Amotta |
| 2015–19 | Nov – May | (Portugal) Jesualdo Ferreira |
| 2019–21 | May – Nov | (Spain) Xavi |
| 2021–22 | Nov – Jul | (Spain) Javi Gracia |
| 2022–23 | Jul – Jul | (Spain) Juanma Lillo |
| 2023 | Jul – Nov | (Portugal) Bruno Pinheiro |
| 2023–24 | Nov – Jul | (Qatar) Wesam Rizik |
| 2024–25 | Jul – Oct | (Spain) Félix Sánchez |
| 2025–26 | Nov – Jun | (Italy) Roberto Mancini |
| 2026– | Jul – | (Romania) Răzvan Lucescu |

Notes

- Note 1 denotes player–manager role.
- Note 2 denotes caretaker role.

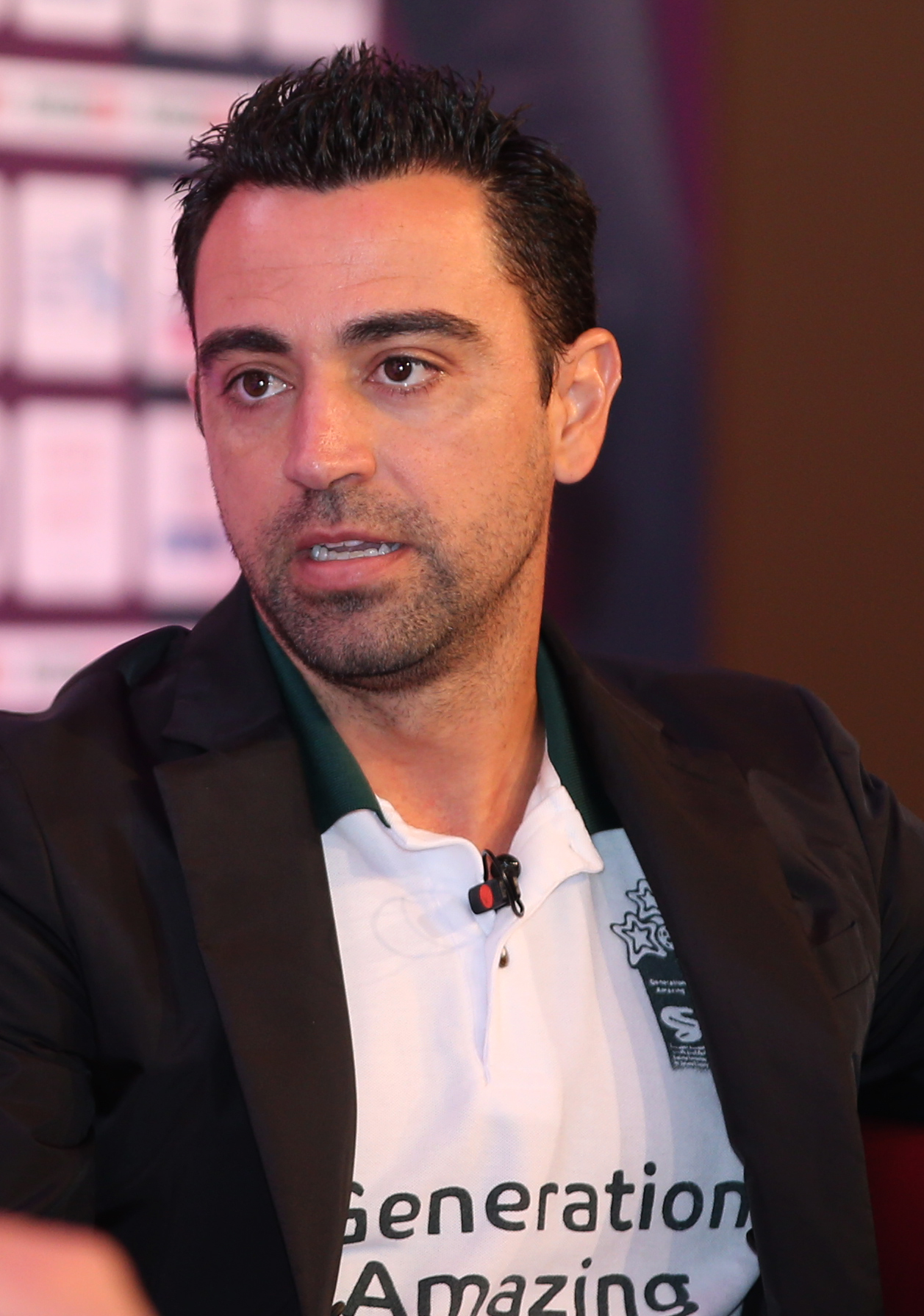
Xavi, former coach of Al Sadd.

== Club officials ==
Management

| Office | Name |
|---|---|
| Président | Mohammed bin Khalifa Al Thani |
| Vice-président | Nasser bin Mubarak Al Ali |
| Board member | Jassim Al Romaihi |
| Board member | Khalifa Al Attiyah |
| Treasurer | Fahad Al Kaabi |
| Board member | Abdulaziz Al Mana |
| Board member | Fahad Al Kuwari |
| Board member | Mohammed Ghanem Al Ali |
Board of directors

Presidential history

| | Président |
|---|---|
| 1 | HE Ahmad bin Jassim bin Fahad Al-Thani |
| 2 | HE Abdullah bin Hamad Al-Attiya |
| 3 | HE Jassim bin Hamad bin Jaber Al-Thani |
| 4 | HE Mohammed bin Mubarak Al-Ali |
| 5 | HE Nasser bin Mubarak Al-Ali |
| 6 | HE Mohammed bin Khalifa Al Thani |

== Rivalries ==
=== Al Rayyan ===
A rivalry which stems from early in the history of the league, it is popularly known as the 'Qatari El Clasico'.

==== Head-to-head ====
Updated 16 March 2023

Head-to-head
| Competition | P | W | D | L | GF | GA | GD |
|---|---|---|---|---|---|---|---|
| Qatar Stars League | 60 | 27 | 13 | 20 | 102 | 79 | +4 |
| Sheikh Jassem Cup | 6 | 2 | 2 | 2 | 7 | 6 | +1 |
| Emir Cup | 10 | 5 | 0 | 5 | 14 | 13 | +1 |
| Crown Prince Cup | 11 | 3 | 5 | 3 | 12 | 10 | +2 |
| Reserve League | 8 | 4 | 2 | 2 | 16 | 11 | +5 |
| Qatar Stars cup | 2 | 0 | 1 | 1 | 2 | 3 | −1 |
| Arab Champions League | 1 | 1 | 0 | 0 | 5 | 1 | +4 |
| Total | 95 | 41 | 20 | 34 | 161 | 119 | +42 |

=== Al Arabi ===
This is the clash of Qatar's two most successful teams: Al Sadd and Al Arabi. For some fans, winning this derby is more noteworthy than winning the league itself. The derby is an important component of the country's culture.

Al Arabi always regarded themselves as the club of Qatar's working class, in contrast with the more upper-class support base of Al Sadd. The social class divide between the two fan bases eventually diminished.

==== Memorable matches ====
Bold indicates a win.

| Season | Result | Competition | Notes |
|---|---|---|---|
| 1981–82 | 0–1 | Emir Cup | |
| 1985–86 | **3–2** | Emir Cup | |
| 1995–96 | 0–0 | Qatar Stars League | Al Arabi crowned champions. |
| 2001–02 | **6–2** | Qatar Stars League | |
| 2003–04 | **7–0** | Qatar Stars League | |
| 2005–06 | **2–1** | Qatar Stars League | Al Sadd crowned champions. |
| 2009–10 | 3–3 | Qatar Stars League | Al Sadd came back from 3–0 down to deny Al Arabi an ACL spot. |

==== Head-to-head ====
league From 1996 to 2023.

Head-to-head
| Competition | P | W | D | L | GF | GA | GD |
|---|---|---|---|---|---|---|---|
| Qatar Stars League | 61 | 34 | 13 | 14 | 137 | 66 | +71 |
| Sheikh Jassem Cup | 6 | 5 | 0 | 1 | 13 | 8 | +5 |
| Emir Cup | 14 | 8 | 2 | 4 | 23 | 15 | +8 |
| Crown Prince Cup | 3 | 2 | 0 | 1 | 6 | 4 | +2 |
| Reserve League | 8 | 4 | 2 | 2 | 16 | 11 | +5 |
| Qatar Stars Cup | 6 | 2 | 2 | 2 | 20 | 13 | +7 |
| Total | 97 | 55 | 19 | 23 | 189 | 100 | +89 |

== Supporters ==
Historically, Al Sadd has been the favoured club of Qatar's upper-class. The club garnered many supporters in the early years of the Qatar Stars League, along with Al Rayyan and Al-Arabi, who were the three main powers of the league.

The new millennium saw an influx of new fans as a result of recruiting many foreign nationals to play for the club, as well as the club's performance in regional competitions.

In order to better communicate with the fans, Al Sadd's fan club was established in the 2003–04 season of the QSL and was then an unprecedented idea in most Gulf and Arab clubs. The fan club serves many roles; it is not merely restricted to organizing fan groups within the stadium, but it is also used as a means to discuss ways in which to improve the club. In addition, annual general meetings are held between the management and fans in order to have an open platform to discuss issues in an open environment. This was greatly criticized at the beginning, while now other clubs are following suit.

The club also has annual and monthly awards for the best players of the club which is sponsored by Givenchy. The fan club has won the QFA-sanctioned title of best fan club in Qatar for three successive years – 2006, 2007 and 2008.

Furthermore, the fan club was also the first in Qatar to put the free SMS service for mobiles in place. This attracted more than 8000 subscribers who received a number of over 3 million SMS' during the first one and a half years.

Also active on social networking sites, the club has official Facebook and X accounts.

== Asian record ==
Updated 28 May 2014.

| Competition | Pld | W | D | L | GF | GA |
|---|---|---|---|---|---|---|
| AFC Champions League | 51 | 22 | 11 | 18 | 75 | 61 |
| Asian Club Championship | 9 | 6 | 2 | 1 | 16 | 8 |
| Total | 60 | 28 | 13 | 19 | 91 | 69 |

- Q = Qualification
- GS = Group stage
- R16 = Round of 16
- QF = Quarter-final
- SF = Semi-final

Asian Club Championship

| Competition | Round | Country | Club | Home | Away | Aggregate |
1988–89
| Asian Club Championship | GS | (Syria) | Al-Futowa | 4–1 | | |
| | GS | (Lebanon) | Al-Ansar | 1–0 | | |
| | GS | (Iraq) | Al-Rasheed | 0–0 | | |
| | SF | (Malaysia) | Pahang FA | 2–0 | | |
| | SF | (Bangladesh) | Mohammedan SC | 2–2 | | |
| | SF | (North Korea) | 25 April | 2–1 | | |
| | SF | (Saudi Arabia) | Al-Ittifaq | 2–1 | | |
| | Final | (Iraq) | Al-Rasheed | 1–0 | 2–3 | 3–3 (A) |

AFC Champions League

| Competition | Round | Country | Club | Home | Away | Aggregate |
2002–03
| AFC Champions League | GS | (Iran) | Esteghlal | 1–2 | | 1–2 |
| | GS | (United Arab Emirates) | Al Ain | | 2–0 | 2–0 |
| | GS | (Saudi Arabia) | Al-Hilal | | 1–3 | 1–3 |
2003–04
| AFC Champions League | GS | (United Arab Emirates) | Al Wahda | 0–0 | 0–0 | 0–0 |
| | GS | (Iraq) | Al Quwa Al Jawiya | 1–0 | 0–1 | 1–1 |
| | GS | (Kuwait) | Al Qadisiya | ^{1} | 0–0 | 0–0 |
2004–05
| AFC Champions League | GS | (United Arab Emirates) | Al Ahli | 2–0 | 1–2 | 3–2 |
| | GS | (Kuwait) | Al Kuwait | 1–0 | 1–0 | 2–0 |
| | GS | (Uzbekistan) | Neftchi | 3–2 | 0–2 | 3–4 |
| | QF | (South Korea) | Busan I'Park | 1–2 | 0–3 | 1–5 |
2005–06
| AFC Champions League | GS | (Saudi Arabia) | Al Shabab | 2–3 | 0–0 | 2–3 |
| | GS | (Kuwait) | Al Arabi | 4–1 | 2–1 | 6–2 |
| | GS | (Iraq) | Al Quwa Al Jawiya | 3–0 | 2–0 | 5–0 |
2006–07
| AFC Champions League | GS | (Syria) | Al-Karamah | 1–1 | 1–2 | 2–3 |
| | GS | (Iraq) | Najaf FC | 1–4 | 0–1 | 1–5 |
| | GS | (Uzbekistan) | Neftchi Farg'ona | 2–0 | 1–2 | 3–2 |
2007–08
| AFC Champions League | GS | (Saudi Arabia) | Al-Ahli Jeddah | 2–1 | 2–2 | 4–3 |
| | GS | (United Arab Emirates) | Al-Wahda | 0–0 | 2–2 | 2–2 |
| | GS | (Syria) | Al-Karamah | 0–2 | 0–1 | 0–3 |
2009–10
| AFC Champions League | GS | (Saudi Arabia) | Al-Hilal | 0–3 | 0–0 | 0–3 |
| | GS | (United Arab Emirates) | Al-Ahli | 2–2 | 5–0 | 7–2 |
| | GS | (Iran) | Mes Kerman | 4–1 | 1–3 | 5–4 |
2010–11
| AFC Champions League | Q1 | (Syria) | Al-Ittihad | 5–1 | | |
| | Q1 | (India) | Dempo | 2–0 | | |
| | GS | (Iran) | Esteghlal | 2–2 | 1–1 | 3–3 |
| | GS | (Uzbekistan) | Pakhtakor | 2–1 | 1–1 | 3–2 |
| | GS | (Saudi Arabia) | Al-Nassr | 1–0 | 1–1 | 2–1 |
| | R16 | (Saudi Arabia) | Al-Shabab | 1–0 | | |
| | QF | (Iran) | Sepahan | 1–2 | 3–0^{2} | 4–2 |
| | SF | (South Korea) | Suwon Samsung | 0–1 | 2–0 | 2–1 |
| | Final | (South Korea) | Jeonbuk Hyundai | 4–2 pen | | |

^1 Following the match between Al-Qadisiya and Al Sadd, Kuwaiti security personnel assaulted the visiting players; Al-Qadisiya were ejected from the competition and banned from AFC competitions for three years. Their record was expunged.

^2 The AFC Disciplinary Committee decided to award the quarter-final first leg to Al Sadd against Sepahan as a 3–0 forfeit win after Sepahan were found guilty of fielding an ineligible player. The match originally ended 1–0 to Sepahan.

=== Participations ===
- PO: Play-off Round, Q : Qualified, GS : Group stage, R16 : Round of 16, QF : Quarterfinals, SF : Semi-finals, RU : Runners-up, W : Winners

Participations
| Qualified | 2003 | 2004 | 2005 | 2006 | 2007 | 2008 | 2010 | 2011 | 2014 | 2015 | 2016 | 2017 | 2018 | 2019 | 2020 | 2021 |
|---|---|---|---|---|---|---|---|---|---|---|---|---|---|---|---|---|
| 14 Times | GS | GS | QF | GS | GS | GS | GS | W | QF | R16 | PO | PO | SF | SF | R16 | GS |

- Asian Club Championship: 4 appearances

1989: Champion
1990: Qualifying Stage
1991: Qualifying Stage
2000: Second Round

- Asian Cup Winners' Cup: 4 appearances

1991/92: First Round
1994/95: Quarter-Final
2000/01: Second Round
2001/02: 3rd place

== International record ==
| Competition | Pld | W | D | L | GF | GA |
|---|---|---|---|---|---|---|
| FIFA Club World Cup | 3 | 2 | 0 | 1 | 2 | 5 |
| Total | 3 | 2 | 0 | 1 | 2 | 5 |

== Other sports ==
=== Volleyball ===
Achievements
| Preceded by Yomiuri (Japan) | Champions of Asia; 1988–89 | Succeeded by Liaoning FC (China) |
| Preceded by Seongnam Ilhwa Chunma (South Korea) | Champions of Asia; 2011 | Succeeded by Ulsan Hyundai (South Korea) |
