= Hassan Mattar =

Qatari footballer (born 1956)

Hassan Mattar Al-Suwaidi
Personal information
- Date of birth: 1 January 1956 (age 70)
- Place of birth: Doha, Qatar
- Position: Forward

Youth career
- Al Oruba

Senior career*
Years	Team	Apps	(Gls)
1973–1975	Al Oruba		
1975–1982	Al Sadd		

International career
- Qatar
- * Club domestic league appearances and goals

Hassan Mattar (Arabic: حسن مطر; born 1 January 1956) is a Qatari former striker who played for Al Sadd and the Qatar national team. He currently serves as the Head of Youth Teams for Al Sadd.

He was an international for the Qatar national team, participating in the Arabian Gulf Cup. He started off playing for Al Oruba, but when the head coach Hassan Othman transferred to Al Sadd, he brought Mattar with him. At that time in Qatari football, players could transfer from clubs virtually unconditionally with no clubs paying to transfer players. He received a call from Sheikh Hamad bin Suhaim, the former president of Al Oruba, who was shocked at Mattar's decision to switch clubs. Nonetheless, he stayed with his current club. He played a crucial role in the 1982 Emir Cup, where he scored the winner against Al Rayyan, and also in the league, where he was the top scorer in the 1980–81 season. The last Emir Cup he participated in was the 1982 edition.

He had a role in Al Sadds management in the early 1990s and was later appointed Head of Youth Teams.

== Honours ==
- Individual
  - Qatar Stars League top scorer:

1980–81
