= Mubarak Anber =

Qatari footballer (born 1954)

Personal information
- Full name: Mubarak Anber Aman Al-Ali
- Date of birth: 1 January 1954 (age 72)
- Place of birth: Qatar
- Height: 1.76 m (5 ft 9 in)
- Position: Defender

Youth career
- 1969–1971: Al Oruba

Senior career*
Years	Team	Apps	(Gls)
1971–1974	Al Oruba		
1975–1988	Al Sadd	246	(??)

International career
1972–1986	Qatar		
- * Club domestic league appearances and goals

Mubarak Anber Aman Al-Ali (Arabic: مبارك عنبر أمان العلي; born 1 January 1954) is a former Qatari football defender who played for Qatar from 1972 to 1984, including in the 1984 Asian Cup.

== Early life ==
Anber was born on January 1st 1954, in Doha, Qatar.

== Club career ==
Anber first played for Al Oruba, later to be known as Qatar SC, making his first team debut in 1971 against Al Sadd where his team lost by one goal. He eventually left the club in 1975, after the Al-Oruba head coach Hassan Othman, had transferred to Al Sadd and specifically requested the transfer of Anber as well, who he believed held high potential. He served as captain of Al Sadd from 1977 till 1988, captaining them to a total of 6 Emir Cups, a record.

== International career ==
Anber made his debut for the Qatar national team in the 1972 Gulf Cup, He played international football in 1984 after the 1984 Summer Olympics and last played for the Qatar national team in the 1986 Gulf Cup, He retired from club football in 1988.
