= 1971–72 Qatar Stars League =

9th season of top-tier football league in Qatar

Qatar Stars League
- Season: 1971–72

Statistics of Qatar Stars League for the 1971–72 season.

== Overview ==
Al-Sadd Sports Club won the championship.
