= 2013 Emir of Qatar Cup =

Tournament details
- Country: Qatar
- Dates: 22 April - 18 May
- Teams: 18

The 2013 Emir of Qatar Cup was the 41st edition of a men's football tournament in Qatar. It was played by the 1st and 2nd level divisions of the Qatari football league structure.

The draw for the competition was on 1 April 2013.

The cup winner was guaranteed a place in the 2014 AFC Champions League.

== Round 1 ==
Four teams from the 2nd Division enter this round, the winners qualify for round two.

April 22, 2013

Al-Shamal	2–2	Al-Mesaimeer
Penalties
	3–2

April 22, 2013

Al-Shahaniya	2–2	Al-Markhiya
Penalties
	0–3

== Round 2 ==
April 29, 2013

Al Ahli	0–0	Al-Wakrah
Penalties
	4–3

April 29, 2013

Al Arabi	0–0	Al-Muaither
Penalties
	6–5

April 29, 2013

Al Kharitiyath	2–0	Al-Shamal

April 29, 2013

Al-Sailiya	4–1	Al-Markhiya

== Round 3 ==
May 5, 2013

Al-Khor	1–1	Al-Sailiya
Penalties
	5–4

May 5, 2013

Al Arabi	0–1	Umm Salal

May 5, 2013

Al-Gharafa	0–0	Al Kharitiyath
Penalties
	3–5 (Note: Al Kharitiyath were deemed to have played an ineligible player and Al-Gharafa were later awarded a 3–0 victory to proceed to the next round.)

May 5, 2013

Qatar SC	2–2	Al Ahli
Penalties
	5–4

== Quarter finals ==
May 8, 2013

Al-Khor	1–4	Al-Rayyan

May 8, 2013

Umm Salal	0–1	Al-Sadd

May 8, 2013

Al-Gharafa	2–4	Lekhwiya

May 8, 2013

Qatar SC	0–1	El Jaish

== Semi finals ==
May 11, 2013

Al-Rayyan	1–1	El Jaish
Penalties
	5–4

May 11, 2013

Al-Sadd	3–2	Lekhwiya

== Final ==
Team 1	Score	Team 2
18 May 2013
Al Rayyan	2–1	Al-Sadd
