= Giorgio Bianchi =

Giorgio Bianchi may refer to:

- Giorgio Bianchi (director) (1904–1967), Italian film director and actor
- Giorgio Bianchi (1575–1646), Roman Catholic bishop known as Gjergj Bardhi in Albanian
