= Abdelkader Youmir =

Moroccan footballer and manager

Personal information
- Place of birth: Morocco

Senior career*
Years	Team	Apps	(Gls)
–1975	KAC Kénitra		
1982	KSV Alsemberg		

Managerial career
- 1985–1986: KAC Kénitra
- 1986–1987: OC Khouribga
- –: MAS Fez
- –: Moghreb Tétouan
- 1989–1990: SCC Mohammédia
- 1990: Nadi al-Badii
- –: Wydad de Fès
- –1994: Union Sidi Kacem
- 1994–1996: COD Meknès
- 1996: Kawkab Marrakech
- –: Al-Ahli (Bahrain)
- 2001–2002: KAC Kénitra
- 2003–2004: Al-Nasr (Kuwait)
- –: MAS Fez
- –: COD Meknès
- 2008–2009: Abha Club
- 2009: KAC Kénitra
- 2010–2011: Chabab Rif Al Hoceima
- 2011–2012: Damac
- * Club domestic league appearances and goals

Abdelkader Youmir (Arabic: عبد القادر يومير) is a Moroccan football manager and former player.

== Career ==
After finishing college, Youmir played senior football with his home town club KAC Kénitra. In 1975, he studied abroad in Brussels, where he played semi-pro football with KSV Alsemberg.

When Youmir returned to Morocco, he began a career as a manager. He led his home town club KAC Kénitra during the 1985–86 and 2001–02 seasons, before returning in 2009. He managed several clubs in Morocco, Bahrain, Kuwait and Saudi Arabia. He won the 1994-95 Botola with COD Meknès and the 1996 CAF Cup with Kawkab Marrakech. In 2010, Youmir managed Chabab Rif Al Hoceima during its maiden season in the Botola.
