= 1987–88 Qatar Stars League =

24th season of top-tier Qatari football

Qatar Stars League
- Season: 1987–88
- Champions: Al Sadd
- Asian Club Championship: Al Sadd
- Top goalscorer: (Qatar) Hassan Jawhar (11 goals)

Statistics of Qatar Stars League for the 1987–88 season.

== Overview ==
Al Sadd won the championship.

== Personnel ==
Team	Head coach
Al Ahli	(Brazil) Joubert
Al-Arabi	
Al-Ittihad	
Al-Rayyan	
Al Sadd	(Qatar) Ahmed Omar
Al-Shamal	(Brazil) Cabralzinho
Al-Taawon	(Brazil) Alcides Romano Júnior
Al-Wakrah	
Qatar SC	(Brazil) Paulo Massa

== Foreign players ==
Team	Player 1	Player 2	Player 3	Former players
Al Ahli	(Iran) Abdolali Changiz	(Iran) Shahin Bayani		
Al-Arabi	(Iran) Jafar Mokhtarifar			
Al-Ittihad	(Iran) Mohammad Panjali	(Iran) Sirous Ghayeghran		
Al-Rayyan	(Iran) Ebrahim Ghasempour			(Egypt) Mohamed Hashish
Al Sadd	(Iran) Amir Ghalenoei			
Al-Shamal	(Iran) Shahrokh Bayani			
Al-Taawon				
Al-Wakrah	(Brazil) Luisinho Lemos			(Brazil) Vagner Mancini
Qatar SC	(Iran) Abdolreza Barzegari	(Iran) Hamid Derakhshan	(Iran) Nasser Mohammadkhani	
