= 1978–79 Qatar Stars League =

15th season of top-tier football league in Qatar

Qatar Stars League
- Season: 1978–79

Statistics of Qatar Stars League for the 1978–79 season.

== Overview ==
Al-Sadd Sports Club won the championship.

== Top scorers ==
Scorer	Club	Goals
(Qatar) Hassan Mattar	Al Sadd	11
