= Amir of Qatar Cup =

- Founded: 1972; 54 years ago
- Country: Qatar
- Confederation: Asian Football Confederation
- Number of clubs: 20
- Current champions: Al-Gharafa (9th title) (2026)
- Most championships: Al Sadd (19 titles)
- Current: 2026 Emir of Qatar Cup

Amir of Qatar Cup (Arabic: كأس أمير قطر), also formally known as the Emir Cup, which was eventually changed to the Amir Cup starting in 2019, is an association football tournament played every season by all first and second division teams in Qatar. The tournament is played in a knockout system, starting with the round of 16. If there is no winner after regulation time, a penalty shootout decides the winner.

== History ==
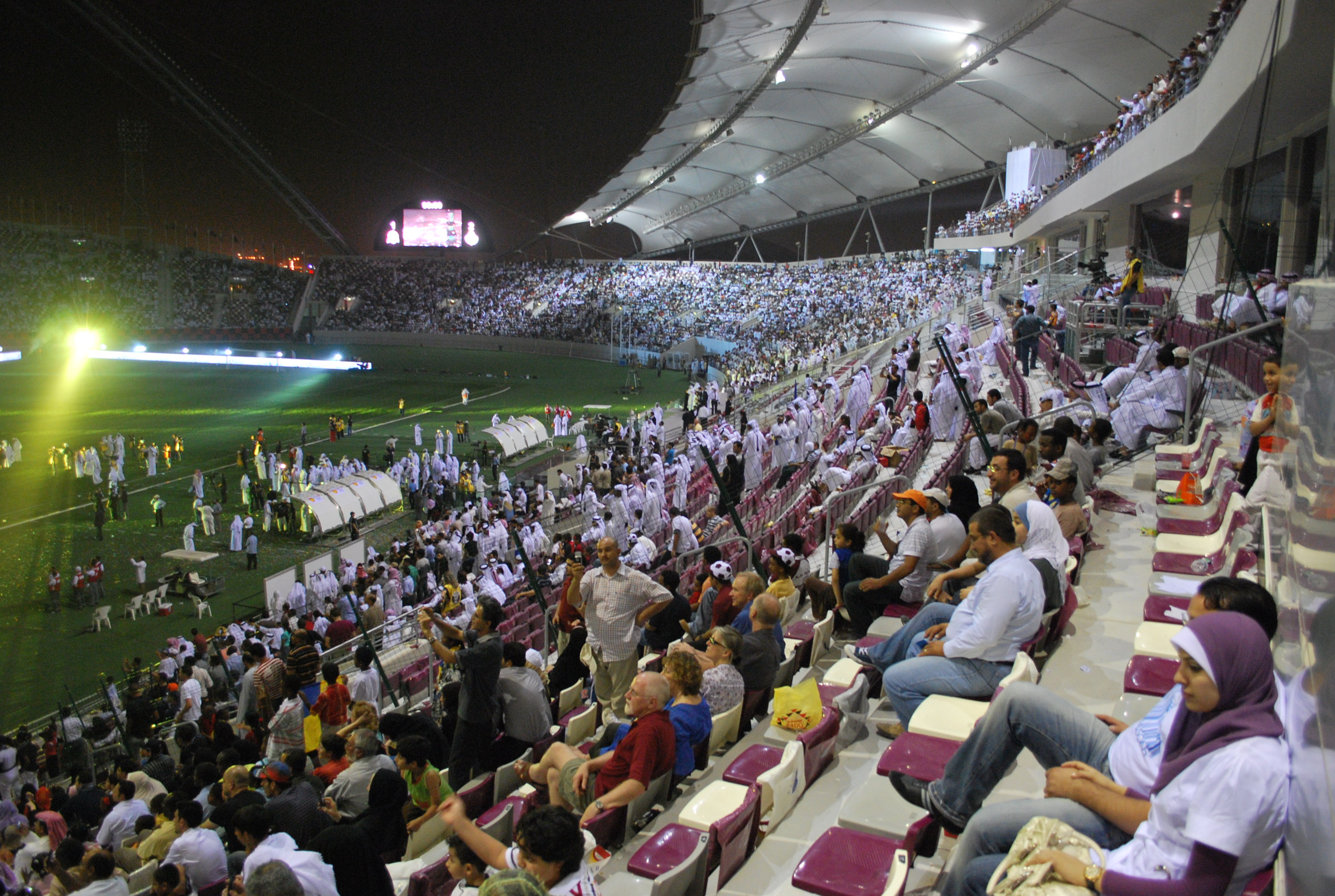
Qatar Emir Cup in 2009

The Amir of Qatar Cup is the biggest football cup in the country. The cup was originally only contested by first division teams, but in 1999 the Qatar Football Association decided to allow all second division teams to participate. The cup was played for the first time in 1972, and was won by Al Ahli. The most successful teams are Al Sadd SC with 18 titles and Al-Arabi SC with eight titles. In total, eight teams have won the competition. Ali Absi was the first foreign referee to officiate a match in the first edition of the Emir Cup.

== Previous winners ==
- 1972–73: Al Ahli 6–1 Al Rayyan
- 1973–74: Qatar SC 2–1 Al Sadd
- 1974–75: Al Sadd 4–3 Al Ahli
- 1975–76: Qatar SC 4–3 Al Arabi
- 1976–77: Al Sadd 1–0 Al-Rayyan
- 1977–78: Al Arabi 5–1 Al Wakrah Club
- 1978–79: Al Arabi 3–1 Al Wakrah Club
- 1979–80: Al Arabi 2–1 Al-Khor
- 1980–81: Al Ahli 2–1 Qatar SC
- 1981–82: Al Sadd 2–1 Al-Rayyan
- 1982–83: Al Arabi 1–0 Al Sadd
- 1983–84: Al Arabi 3–2 Al Ahli
- 1984–85: Al Sadd 2–1 Al Ahli
- 1985–86: Al Sadd 2–0 Al Arabi
- 1986–87: Al Ahli 2–0 Al Sadd
- 1987–88: Al Sadd 4–3 Al Wakrah Club
- 1988–89: Al Arabi 2–0 Qatar SC
- 1989–90: Al Arabi 3–0 Al Wakrah Club
- 1990–91: Al Sadd 1–0 Al-Rayyan
- 1991–92: Al Ahli 2–1 Al Rayyan
- 1992–93: Al Arabi 3–0 Al Sadd
- 1993–94: Al Sadd 3–2 Al Arabi
- 1994–95: Al-Gharafa 2–1 Al Wakrah Club
- 1995–96: Al-Gharafa 5–2 Al-Rayyan
- 1996–97: Al-Gharafa 1–1 Al-Rayyan (aet, 3–2 pens)
- 1997–98: Al-Gharafa 4–3 Al Ahli
- 1998–99: Al Rayyan 2–1 Al-Gharrafa
- 1999–2000: Al Sadd 2–0 Al-Rayyan
- 2000–01: Al Sadd 3–2 Qatar SC
- 2001–02: Al-Gharafa 4–1 Al Sadd
- 2002–03: Al Sadd 2–1 Al Ahli
- 2003–04: Al Rayyan 3–2 Qatar SC
- 2004–05: Al Sadd 0–0 Al Wakrah Club (aet, 5–4 pens)
- 2005–06: Al Rayyan 1–1 Al-Gharafa (aet, 5–3 pens)
- 2006–07: Al Sadd 0–0 Al-Khor (aet, 5–4 pens)
- 2007–08: Umm-Salal Sports Club 2–2 Al-Gharafa (aet, 4–1 pens)
- 2009: Al-Gharafa 2–1 Al Rayyan
- 2010: Al Rayyan 1–0 Umm-Salal Sports Club
- 2011: Al Rayyan 2–1 Al-Gharafa
- 2012: Al-Gharafa 0–0 Al Sadd (aet, 4–3 pens)
- 2013: Al Rayyan 2–1 Al Sadd
- 2014: Al Sadd 3–0 Al-Sailiya
- 2015: Al Sadd 2–1 El Jaish
- 2016: Lekhwiya SC 2–2 Al-Sadd SC (aet, 4–2 pens)
- 2017: Al Sadd 2–1 Al Rayyan
- 2018: Al-Duhail 2–1 Al Rayyan
- 2019: Al-Duhail 4–1 Al Sadd
- 2020: Al Sadd 2–1 Al-Arabi
- 2021: Al Sadd 1–1 Al Rayyan (aet, 5–4 pens)
- 2022: Al-Duhail 5–1 Al-Gharafa
- 2023: Al-Arabi 3–0 Al-Sadd
- 2024: Al-Sadd 1–0 Qatar SC
- 2025: Al-Gharafa 2–1 Al-Rayyan
- 2026: Al-Gharafa 4–1 Al-Sadd

== Statistics ==
=== Referees of finals ===
- 1972–73 : (Palestine) Ali Absi
- 1973–74 : (Jordan) Ahed Shanti
- 1974–75 : (Jordan) Ahed Shanti
- 1975–76 : (Qatar) Taleb Ballan
- 1976–77 : (Qatar) Taleb Ballan
- 1977–78 : (Qatar) Mubarak Walid
- 1978–79 : (Qatar) Taleb Ballan
- 1979–80 : (Qatar) Mubarak Walid
- 1980–81 : (Qatar) Taleb Ballan
- 1981–82 : (Egypt) Mustafa Ezzat
- 1982–83 : (Egypt) Mustafa Ezzat
- 1983–84 : (Qatar) Mohammed Al Mulla
- 1984–85 : (Qatar) Hassan Al Mulla
- 1985–86 : (Qatar) Juman Salem
- 1986–87 : (Qatar) Ibrahim Buahuan
- 1987–88 : (Qatar) Hassan Al Mulla
- 1988–89 : (Qatar) Ibrahim Buahuan
- 1989–90 : (Qatar) Hassan Al Mulla
- 1990–91 : (Qatar) Ibrahim Buahuan
- 1991–92 : (Saudi Arabia) Omer Al Mehannah
- 1992–93 : (Algeria) Rashid Mujeebi
- 1993–94 : (Qatar) Ibrahim Al Kaabi
- 1994–95 : (Qatar) Hassan Jawhar
- 1995–96 : (Qatar) Jumaa Ali
- 1996–97 : (Qatar) Jassim Mohammed Al Hail
- 1997–98 : (Qatar) Jassim Al Khouri
- 1998–99 : (Qatar) Abdulla Al Qahtani
- 1999–2000 : (Qatar) Jassim Mohammed Al Hail
- 2000–01 : (Morocco) Said Belqola
- 2001–02 : (England) Graham Barber
- 2002–03 : (Italy) Pierluigi Collina
- 2003–04 : (Germany) Markus Merk
- 2004–05 : (England) Steve Bennett
- 2005–06 : (England) Graham Poll
- 2006–07 : (Italy) Roberto Rosetti
- 2007–08 : (Slovakia) Ľuboš Micheľ
- 2009 : (Italy) Roberto Rosetti
- 2010 : (Belgium) Frank De Bleeckere
- 2011 : (Hungary) Viktor Kassai
- 2012 : (Slovenia) Damir Skomina
- 2013 : (Qatar) Abdulrahman Abdou
- 2014 : (Qatar) Khamis Al-Marri
- 2015 : (Qatar) Khamis Al-Kuwari
- 2016 : (Qatar) Salman Falahi
- 2017 : (Italy) Gianluca Rocchi
- 2018 : (Qatar) Abdulrahman Al Jassim
- 2019 : (Qatar) Abdulrahman Al Jassim
- 2020 : (Qatar) Saoud Al-Adhbah
- 2021 : (Qatar) Abdullah Al Athbah
- 2022 : (Qatar) Abdulhadi Al Ruaile

- 2025 : (Qatar) Mohammed Ahmed Al-Shammari

=== Winning club captains ===
Source: alarab.qa

- 1972–73 : (Qatar) Mohammed Ghanim Al Rumaihi
- 1973–74 : (Qatar) Mubarak Walid Said
- 1974–75 : (Qatar) Obeid Jumaa
- 1975–76 : (Qatar) Salman Faraj
- 1976–77 : (Qatar) Mubarak Anber
- 1977–78 : (Qatar) Majid Al Sayegh
- 1978–79 : (Qatar) Majid Al Sayegh
- 1979–80 : (Qatar) Abdullah Saad Al Sulaiti
- 1980–81 : (Qatar) Hussein Khawaja
- 1981–82 : (Qatar) Mubarak Anber
- 1982–83 : (Qatar) Abdullah Saad Al Sulaiti
- 1983–84 : (Qatar) Abdullah Saad Al Sulaiti
- 1984–85 : (Qatar) Mubarak Anber
- 1985–86 : (Qatar) Mubarak Anber
- 1986–87 : (Qatar) Adel Malallah
- 1987–88 : (Qatar) Yousef Al Adsani
- 1988–89 : (Qatar) Ibrahim Khalfan
- 1989–90 : (Qatar) Nasser Mohammed Al-Hitmi
- 1990–91 : (Qatar) Yousef Al Adsani
- 1991–92 : (Qatar) Adel Malallah
- 1992–93 : (Qatar) Mohammed Dahham Al Suwaidi
- 1993–94 : (Qatar) Yousef Al Adsani
- 1994–95 : (Qatar) Adel Khamis
- 1995–96 : (Qatar) Adel Khamis
- 1996–97 : (Qatar) Adel Khamis
- 1997–98 : (Qatar) Adel Khamis
- 1998–99 : (Qatar) Younes Ahmed
- 1999–2000 : (Qatar) Abdulnasser Al-Obaidly
- 2000–01 : (Qatar) Abdulnasser Al-Obaidly
- 2001–02 : (Qatar) Amer Al Kaabi
- 2002–03 : (Qatar) Jafal Rashed Al-Kuwari
- 2003–04 : (Spain) Fernando Hierro
- 2004–05 : (Qatar) Jafal Rashed Al-Kuwari
- 2005–06 : (Qatar) Abdulrahman Al-Kuwari
- 2006–07 : (Qatar) Jafal Rashed Al-Kuwari
- 2007–08 : (Morocco) Aziz Ben Askar
- 2009 : (Qatar) Saad Al-Shammari
- 2010 : (Brazil) Marcelo Tavares
- 2011 : (Qatar) Fábio César
- 2012 : (Morocco) Otmane El Assas
- 2013 : (Qatar) Fábio César
- 2014 : (Spain) Raúl
- 2015 : (Qatar) Talal Al-Bloushi
- 2016 : (Qatar) Karim Boudiaf
- 2017 : (Spain) Xavi
- 2018 : (Qatar) Karim Boudiaf
- 2019 : (Qatar) Mohammed Musa
- 2020 : (Qatar) Hassan Al-Haydos
- 2021 : (Qatar) Hassan Al-Haydos
- 2022 : (Qatar) Almoez Ali
- 2023 : (Qatar) Unknown
- 2024 : (Qatar) Hassan Al-Haydos
- 2025 : (Tunisia) Ferjani Sassi

=== Club managers in finals ===
Statistics accurate as of 6 September 2022.

- 1972–73 : (Sudan) Mohammed Kheiri (Al Ahli) def. (Sudan) Salem Ashour (Al Rayyan)
- 1973–74 : (Egypt) Wagdi Jamal (Qatar SC) def. Said Musa (Al Sadd)
- 1974–75 : (Sudan) Hassan Othman (Al Sadd) def. (Egypt) Ali Attar (Al Ahli)
- 1975–76 : (Sudan) Mohammed Kheiri (Qatar SC) def. (Egypt) Wagdi Jamal (Al Arabi)
- 1976–77 : (Sudan) Hassan Othman (Al Sadd) def. (Sudan) Youssef Saleh (Al Rayyan)
- 1977–78 : (Qatar) Abdul Ameer Zainal (Al Arabi) def. (Egypt) Wagdi Jamal (Al Wakrah)
- 1978–79 : (Brazil) Silas (Al Arabi) def. (Brazil) Carlos Alberto (Al Wakrah)
- 1979–80 : (Brazil) Silas (Al Arabi) def. (England) Ronald Douglas (Al Khor)
- 1980–81 : (Egypt) Helmi Hussein (Al Ahli) def. (South Korea) Park Byung-suk (Qatar SC)
- 1981–82 : (Sudan) Hassan Othman (Al Sadd) def. (Egypt) Abdel Moneim Al Haj (Al Rayyan)
- 1982–83 : (Brazil) Procópio Cardoso (Al Arabi) def. (England) Jimmy Meadows (Al Sadd)
- 1983–84 : (Brazil) Sebastião (Al Arabi) def. (Qatar) Eid Mubarak (Al Ahli)
- 1984–85 : (Sudan) Hassan Othman (Al Sadd) def. (Qatar) Eid Mubarak (Al Ahli)
- 1985–86 : (Brazil) Procópio Cardoso (Al Sadd) def. (Brazil) Sebastião (Al Arabi)
- 1986–87 : (Brazil) Joubert Meira (Al Ahli) def. (Brazil) Procópio Cardoso (Al Sadd)
- 1987–88 : (Qatar) Ahmed Omar (Al Sadd) def. (England) Len Ashurst (Al Wakrah)
- 1988–89 : (England) Joseph Bowie (Al Arabi) def. (Brazil) Paulo Massa (Qatar SC)
- 1989–90 : (Brazil) Luis Alberto (Al Arabi) def. (Qatar) Hassan Ali (Al Wakrah)
- 1990–91 : (Brazil) Silas (Al Sadd) def. (Brazil) René Simões (Al Rayyan)
- 1991–92 : (Brazil) Paulo Massa (Al Ahli) def. (Brazil) Luis Alberto (Al Rayyan)
- 1992–93 : (Brazil) Zé Mário (Al Arabi) def. (Brazil) Sebastião Lapola (Al Sadd)
- 1993–94 : (Qatar) Ahmed Omar (Al Sadd) def. (Brazil) René Simões (Al Arabi)
- 1994–95 : (Bosnia and Herzegovina) Jamal Haji (Al Gharafa) def. (Iraq) Adnan Dirjal (Al Wakrah)
- 1995–96 : (Bosnia and Herzegovina) Jamal Haji (Al Gharafa) def. (Denmark) Benny Johansen (Al Rayyan)
- 1996–97 : (Bosnia and Herzegovina) Jamal Haji (Al Gharafa) def. (Qatar) Eid Mubarak (Al Rayyan)
- 1997–98 : (Bosnia and Herzegovina) Jamal Haji (Al Gharafa) def. (Morocco) Abdelkadir Bomir (Al Ahli)
- 1998–99 : (Denmark) Roald Poulsen (Al Rayyan) def. (Bosnia and Herzegovina) Jamal Haji (Al Gharafa)
- 1999–2000 : (Bosnia and Herzegovina) Džemaludin Mušović (Al Sadd) def. (Denmark) Jørgen E. Larsen (Al Rayyan)
- 2000–01 : (Netherlands) René Meulensteen (Al Sadd) def. (Czech Republic) Verner Lička (Qatar SC)
- 2001–02 : (Austria) Josef Hickersberger (Al Gharafa) def. (Romania) Ilie Balaci (Al Sadd)
- 2002–03 : (Croatia) Luka Peruzović (Al Sadd) def. (Portugal) Carlos Alhinho (Al Ahli)
- 2003–04 : (France) Jean Castaneda (Al Rayyan) def. (Bosnia and Herzegovina) Džemaludin Mušović (Qatar SC)
- 2004–05 : (Serbia) Bora Milutinović (Al Sadd) def. (Iraq) Adnan Dirjal (Al Wakrah)
- 2005–06 : (Algeria) Rabah Madjer (Al Rayyan) def. (Iraq) Harres Mohammed (Al Gharafa)
- 2006–07 : (Uruguay) Jorge Fossati (Al Sadd) def. (France) Jean-Paul Rabier (Al Khor)
- 2007–08 : (France) Laurent Banide (Umm Salal) def. (Brazil) Marcos Paquetá (Al Gharafa)
- 2008–09 : (Brazil) Marcos Paquetá (Al Gharafa) def. (Brazil) Paulo Autuori (Al Rayyan)
- 2009–10 : (Brazil) Paulo Autuori (Al Rayyan) def. (France) Gérard Gili (Umm Salal)
- 2010–11 : (Brazil) Paulo Autuori (Al Rayyan) def. (France) Bruno Metsu (Al Gharafa)
- 2011–12 : (Brazil) Paulo Silas (Al Gharafa) def. (Uruguay) Jorge Fossati (Al Sadd)
- 2012–13 : (Uruguay) Diego Aguirre (Al Rayyan) def. (Morocco) Hussein Ammouta (Al Sadd)
- 2013–14 : (Morocco) Hussein Ammouta (Al Sadd) def. (Tunisia) Sami Trabelsi (Al Sailiya)
- 2014–15 : (France) Sabri Lamouchi (El Jaish SC) def (Morocco) Hussein Ammouta (Al Sadd SC)
- 2015–16 : (Portugal) Jesualdo Ferreira (Al Sadd SC) def (Algeria) Djamel Belmadi (Al Duhail SC)
- 2016–17 : (Denmark) Michael Laudrup (Al Rayyan SC) def (Portugal) Jesualdo Ferreira (Al Sadd SC)
- 2017–18 : (Denmark) Michael Laudrup (Al Rayyan SC) def (Algeria) Djamel Belmadi (Al Duhail SC)
- 2018–19 : (Portugal) Jesualdo Ferreira (Al Sadd SC) def (Portugal) Rui Faria (Al Duhail SC)
- 2019–20 : (Iceland) Heimir Hallgrimsson (Al Arabi SC) def (Spain) Xavi (Al Sadd SC)
- 2020–21 : (France) Laurent Blanc (Al Rayyan SC) def (Spain) Xavi (Al Duhail SC)
- 2021–22 : (Italy) Andrea Stramaccioni (Al Gharafa SC) def (Portugal) Luís Castro (Al Duhail SC)

== Top-performing clubs ==
Club	Champions
Al-Sadd	19
Al-Arabi	9
Al-Gharrafa	9 (5 as Al-Ittihad)
Qatar SC	8 (5 as Al-Oruba)
Al-Rayyan	6
Al-Ahli	4
Al-Duhail	4 (1 as Lekhwiya)
Umm-Salal	1
