= 2012 Sheikh Jassim Cup =

Tournament details
- Country: Qatar
- Dates: 1 August – 14 August
- Teams: 18

Final positions
- Champions: Al Rayyan (3rd title)
- Runners-up: Al-Sadd

The 2012 Sheikh Jassim Cup was the 34th edition of the league cup competition for football teams from Qatar.

Al-Arabi are the defending champions.

== Round One Groups ==
18 clubs from the Qatar Stars League and Qatari 2nd Division were drawn into 4 groups. The winners of each group qualify for the semi-finals.

All group games are played in one 'host' location, instead of the common home and away format used in other competitions.

| Group A | Group B | Group C | Group D |
|---|---|---|---|
| Lekhwiya; Al-Arabi; Al-Gharafa; Al-Shamal | Al-Rayyan; Al-Kharitiyath; Umm-Salal; Al-Markhiya; Al-Shahaniya | Qatar SC; Al-Sadd; Al-Wakra; Al-Sailiya; Al-Mesaimeer | Al-Jaish; Al-Khor; Al-Ahli; Al-Mu'aidar |

== Group stage ==
=== Group A ===
| Team | Pld | W | D | L | GF | GA | GD | Pts |
|---|---|---|---|---|---|---|---|---|
| Al-Arabi | 3 | 3 | 0 | 0 | 10 | 4 | +6 | 9 |
| Al-Gharafa | 3 | 1 | 1 | 1 | 7 | 7 | 0 | 4 |
| Al-Shamal | 3 | 1 | 0 | 2 | 4 | 7 | −3 | 3 |
| Lekhwiya | 3 | 0 | 1 | 2 | 4 | 7 | −3 | 1 |

=== Group B ===
| Team | Pld | W | D | L | GF | GA | GD | Pts |
|---|---|---|---|---|---|---|---|---|
| Al-Rayyan | 4 | 3 | 1 | 0 | 6 | 1 | +5 | 10 |
| Umm-Salal | 4 | 3 | 0 | 1 | 7 | 2 | +5 | 9 |
| Al-Kharitiyath | 4 | 1 | 1 | 2 | 4 | 5 | −1 | 4 |
| Al-Markhiya | 4 | 1 | 1 | 2 | 4 | 6 | −2 | 4 |
| Al-Shahaniya | 4 | 0 | 1 | 3 | 3 | 10 | −7 | 1 |

=== Group C ===
| Team | Pld | W | D | L | GF | GA | GD | Pts |
|---|---|---|---|---|---|---|---|---|
| Al-Sadd | 4 | 3 | 1 | 0 | 8 | 3 | +5 | 10 |
| Al-Wakra | 4 | 2 | 2 | 0 | 6 | 3 | +3 | 8 |
| Qatar SC | 4 | 2 | 0 | 2 | 6 | 5 | +1 | 6 |
| Al-Mesaimeer | 4 | 0 | 2 | 2 | 3 | 7 | −4 | 2 |
| Al-Sailiya | 4 | 0 | 1 | 3 | 2 | 7 | −5 | 1 |

=== Group D ===
| Team | Pld | W | D | L | GF | GA | GD | Pts |
|---|---|---|---|---|---|---|---|---|
| Al-Jaish | 3 | 3 | 0 | 0 | 12 | 1 | +11 | 9 |
| Al-Khor | 3 | 1 | 1 | 1 | 5 | 5 | 0 | 4 |
| Al-Mu'aidar | 3 | 0 | 2 | 1 | 5 | 11 | −6 | 2 |
| Al-Ahli | 3 | 0 | 1 | 2 | 4 | 9 | −5 | 1 |

== Semi-finals ==
| Team 1 | Score | Team 2 |
|---|---|---|
| Al-Arabi | 0–3 | Al-Sadd |
| Al-Rayyan | 1–0 | Al-Jaish |

== Final ==
| Team 1 | Score | Team 2 |
|---|---|---|
| Al-Rayyan | 1–0 | Al-Sadd |
