= 1979–80 Qatar Stars League =

16th season of top-tier football league in Qatar

Qatar Stars League
- Season: 1979–80

Statistics of Qatar Stars League for the 1979–80 season.

== Overview ==
Al-Sadd Sports Club won the championship.
