= Ahmed Omar (footballer) =

Qatari footballer and coach

Personal information
- Full name: Ahmed Omar Shaker Fustuq
- Place of birth: Lebanon
- Date of death: 17 November 2024
- Place of death: Qatar
- Position: Striker

Senior career*
Years	Team	Apps	(Gls)
1970–1975	Al-Ansar		
1975–1983	Al-Sadd		

International career
1976–1977	Qatar	10	(2)

Managerial career
- 1987–1988: Al-Sadd
- 1993–1994: Al-Sadd
- 1996–1997: Al-Sadd
- * Club domestic league appearances and goals

Ahmed Omar Shaker Fustuq (Arabic: أحمد عمر شاكر فستق) was a football coach and former player who played for Al Sadd. Born in Lebanon, he played as a striker for the Qatar national team.

== Playing career ==
Omar played for Al-Ansar of Lebanon, before moving to Qatari club Al-Sadd in 1975. He represented the club for several years before retiring from playing after Al Sadd lost the 1983 Emir Cup final to Al Arabi. After the match, there was a mass brawl between the two teams, and the field was described as a 'boxing ring'.

Omar also gained Qatari citizenship, eventually representing the country at the 1976 Gulf Cup.

== Coaching career ==
Omar went on to coach Al Sadd, first in 1987–88, winning the Emir Cup that year, and again in 1993–94, when he also won the Emir Cup. He was the first person in the history of the Emir Cup to win the title as both coach and player. He coached Al Sadd for a third interval, from 1996 to 1997. He was an AFC Elite Coaching Instructor.

== Death ==
Omar died on 17 November 2024.
