= Jimmy Meadows =

English footballer (1931–1994)

Personal information
- Full name: James Meadows
- Date of birth: 21 July 1931
- Place of birth: Bolton, Lancashire, England
- Date of death: 3 January 1994 (aged 62)
- Place of death: Didsbury, Manchester, England
- Position: Winger

Youth career
- Bolton YMCA

Senior career*
Years	Team	Apps	(Gls)
1948–1951	Southport	60	(6)
1951–1955	Manchester City	130	(30)
Total		190	(36)

International career
1955	England	1	(0)

Managerial career
- 1966–1969: Stockport County
- 1970: Blackpool (caretaker)
- 1970: Bolton Wanderers
- 1971–1973: Southport
- 1974–1975: Stockport County
- 1976: GIF Sundsvall
- 1978: Blackpool (caretaker)
- 1982–1983: Al Sadd SC
- * Club domestic league appearances and goals

James Meadows (21 July 1931 – 3 January 1994) was an English footballer and manager. He started his playing career in 1949 at Third Division Southport, before being transferred to Manchester City in March 1951 for £5,000. He made his only appearance for England against Scotland in April 1955, but the following month suffered a serious injury in the 17th minute of the 1955 FA Cup Final, going for an attempted tackle by his own corner flag. As substitutes were not allowed in the English game until 1965–66, City had to play the rest of the game with ten players resulting in Newcastle United winning 3–1. Meadows' injury was so serious he was forced to retire from playing, and moved into management.

His longest managerial appointment was a 2 1/2-year spell at Stockport County in the late 1960s, and he returned there for a season in 1974. In between, he had a bizarre 81-day spell in charge of Bolton Wanderers in 1971 as team manager under general manager Nat Lofthouse. This spell saw the club virtually condemned to their first-ever period in the Third Division. He returned to Southport as manager in 1971, with whom he had his most successful period in management. He took them to the 1972–73 Fourth Division championship with 62 points, a feat which Bill Shankly described at the time as tougher and more meritorious than his own championship with Liverpool that same year.

Other clubs he served included GIF Sundsvall and two spells at Blackpool. During his first period as Blackpool's caretaker manager in 1970, Meadows appeared alongside Jimmy Armfield and Glyn James as the "Blackpool" team versus "Crystal Palace" in the popular television show Quiz Ball.

== Honours ==
Manchester City

- FA Cup runner-up: 1954–55
