= Jafal Rashed Al-Kuwari =

Qatari footballer (born 1972)

Jaffal Rashed
Personal information
- Full name: Jafal Rashed Al Kuwari
- Date of birth: September 27, 1972 (age 54)
- Place of birth: Qatar
- Height: 1.55 m (5 ft 1 in)
- Position: Midfielder

Youth career
- 1985–1990: Al Sadd

Senior career*
Years	Team	Apps	(Gls)
1990–2009	Al Sadd		

International career^{‡}
1992–2002	Qatar	51	(2+)
- * Club domestic league appearances and goals as of December 10, 2006 ‡ National team caps and goals as of December 10, 2006

Jafal Rashed Al Kuwari (Arabic: جفال راشد الكواري, born on September 27, 1972) is a Qatari former footballer who was a midfielder for Al Sadd. He was also a member and captain of the Qatar national team. He is one of the shortest football players in the world. He officially retired from professional football in a 2009 farewell match held against AC Milan. He has been the team manager and spokesman of Al Sadd since 2009. Additionally, he plays for the Qatar beach football team.

== Career ==
Jafal Al-Kuwari played alongside his brother, Fahad Rashed Al-Kuwari, in the 1992 Summer Olympics for the Qatar U-23 side.
