= 1986–87 Qatar Stars League =

23rd season of top-tier football league in Qatar

Qatar Stars League
- Season: 1986–87
- Champions: Al Sadd
- Asian Club Championship: Al Sadd
- Top goalscorer: (Qatar) Hassan Sabela (9 goals)

Statistics of Qatar Stars League for the 1986–87 season.

== Overview ==
Al Sadd won the championship.

== Personnel ==
Team	Head coach
Al Ahli	
Al-Arabi	
Al-Ittihad	(Somalia) Hassan Afif
Al-Rayyan	(England) Colin Dobson
Al Sadd	(Brazil) Procópio Cardoso
Al-Shamal	(Brazil) Abel Verônico
Al-Taawon	
Al-Wakrah	
Qatar SC	

== Foreign players ==
Team	Player 1	Player 2	Former players
Al Ahli	(Iran) Abdolali Changiz	(Iran) Shahin Bayani	
Al-Arabi			
Al-Ittihad			
Al-Rayyan	(Iran) Ebrahim Ghasempour		
Al Sadd			
Al-Shamal			
Al-Taawon			
Al-Wakrah			(England) Alan Waddle
Qatar SC	(Iran) Abdolreza Barzegari	(Iran) Nasser Mohammadkhani	
