= Džemaludin Mušović =

Bosnian association footballer and manager

Personal information
- Date of birth: 30 October 1944 (age 81)
- Place of birth: Sarajevo, Independent State of Croatia (modern-day Bosnia and Herzegovina)
- Position: Striker

Senior career*
Years	Team	Apps	(Gls)
1962–1966	Sarajevo	89	(38)
1966–1969	Hajduk Split	86	(14)
1970–1972	Sarajevo	73	(20)
1972–1975	Standard Liège	44	(15)
1975–1976	Châteauroux	23	(8)
1976–1977	Valenciennes	16	(5)
Total		331	(100)

International career
1965–1968	Yugoslavia	10	(2)

Managerial career
- 1985–1987: Čelik Zenica
- 1988–1990: Sarajevo
- 1994–1995: Al Sadd
- 1996–1997: Al-Arabi
- 1997–1998: Al Jazira
- 1998–1999: Bosnia and Herzegovina
- 2000: Al Sadd
- 2002–2004: Qatar SC
- 2004–2007: Qatar
- 2008–2009: Al Sadd
- * Club domestic league appearances and goals

Džemaludin Mušović (born 30 October 1944) is a Bosnian retired football manager and player. He is regarded as one of the most successful Bosnian football managers.

== Club career ==
Mušović joined Hajduk Split from Sarajevo in 1966 for 13 million dinar after being persuaded by national teammate Vinko Cuzzi to come over to Dalmatia. He immediately won the 1967 Yugoslav Cup with them, beating his former club.

== International career ==
Mušović made his debut for Yugoslavia in a September 1965 World Cup qualification match away against Luxembourg and has earned a total of 10 caps, scoring 2 goals. His final international was an April 1968 European Championship qualification match against France.

== Managerial statistics ==
Managerial record by team and tenure
Team	From	To	Record				
Team	From	To	P	W	D	L	Win %
Bosnia and Herzegovina	14 May 1998	27 January 1999	7	1	2	4	14.3
Qatar	8 September 2004	16 July 2007	36	15	9	12	41.7
Total			43	16	11	16	37.21

== Honours ==
=== Player ===
Hajduk Split

- Yugoslav Cup: 1966–67

=== Manager ===
Al-Arabi

- Qatar Stars League: 1996–97
- Qatar Crown Prince Cup: 1997

Qatar SC

- Qatar Stars League: 2002–03
- Qatar Crown Prince Cup: 2004

Qatar

- Asian Games: 2006
