= 1980–81 Qatar Stars League =

17th season of top-tier football league in Qatar

Qatar Stars League
- Season: 1980–81

Statistics of Qatar Stars League for the 1980–81 season.

== Overview ==
Al-Sadd Sports Club won the championship.
