= 1988–89 Qatar Stars League =

25th season of top-tier football league in Qatar

Qatar Stars League
- Season: 1988–89
- Champions: Al Sadd
- Asian Club Championship: Al Sadd
- Top goalscorer: (Iran) Farshad Pious (9 goals)

Statistics of Qatar Stars League for the 1988–89 season.

== Overview ==
Al Sadd won the championship.

== Personnel ==
| Team | Head coach |
|---|---|
| Al Ahli | (Brazil) Sebastião Lazaroni |
| Al-Arabi | (England) Joseph Bowie |
| Al-Ittihad | (Qatar) Saeed Al-Misneed |
| Al-Rayyan | (Brazil) Vavá |
| Al Sadd | (Brazil) José Luiz Carbone |
| Al-Shamal | |
| Al-Taawon | (Brazil) Alcides Romano Júnior |
| Al-Wakrah | (England) Len Ashurst |
| Qatar SC | (West Germany) Uli Maslo |

== Foreign players ==
| Team | Player 1 | Player 2 | Player 3 | Former players |
|---|---|---|---|---|
| Al Ahli | (Iran) Farshad Pious | (Iran) Shahin Bayani | | |
| Al-Arabi | (Iran) Abdolali Changiz | (Iran) Jafar Mokhtarifar | | (Algeria) Lakhdar Belloumi |
| Al-Ittihad | (Iran) Hamid Farzamnia | (Iran) Mohammad Panjali | (Iran) Sirous Ghayeghran | |
| Al-Rayyan | | | | |
| Al Sadd | (Iran) Amir Ghalenoei | (Iran) Ebrahim Ghasempour | | |
| Al-Shamal | | | | |
| Al-Taawon | (Lebanon) Mahmoud Hammoud | | | |
| Al-Wakrah | (Brazil) Luisinho Lemos | | | |
| Qatar SC | (Iran) Abdolreza Barzegari | (Iran) Hamid Derakhshan | (Iran) Nasser Mohammadkhani | |
