= Procópio Cardoso =

Brazilian footballer and coach

Personal information
- Date of birth: 21 March 1939 (age 87)
- Place of birth: Salinas, Brazil
- Position: Center back

Youth career
- 1954–1956: Renascença

Senior career*
Years	Team	Apps	(Gls)
1956–1958	Renascença		
1959–1961	Cruzeiro		
1961–1962	São Paulo		
1962–1963	Atlético Mineiro		
1963	Fluminense	33	(2)
1964	Vitória		
1965	Fluminense		
1965–1966	Palmeiras		
1966–1974	Cruzeiro	212	(6)

International career
1963–1968	Brazil	10	(0)

Managerial career
- 1975: Cruzeiro (Youth team)
- 1979–1981: Atlético Mineiro
- 1981–1983: Al-Arabi (QAT)
- 1984: Al-Sharjah
- 1984–1985: Atlético Mineiro
- 1985–1987: Al Sadd
- 1987–1988: Fluminense
- 1989: Qatar
- 1990: Grêmio
- 1991: Ettifaq
- 1992: Atlético Mineiro
- 1993: Atlético Paranaense
- 1994: Internacional
- 1995–1996: Atlético Mineiro
- 1996: Bahia
- 1998: Al Wasl
- 1999: Al Nassr (KSA)
- 2001: Al-Arabi (QAT)
- 2003: Atlético Mineiro
- 2004–2005: Atlético Mineiro
- 2008: América Mineiro
- * Club domestic league appearances and goals

Procópio Cardoso Neto (born March 21, 1939) is a Brazilian former football player and coach.

He started his professional career at Renascença as a center back. Cardoso also played for Belo Horizonte rivals, Cruzeiro and Atlético Mineiro, São Paulo, Fluminense, Vitória and Palmeiras. In a game of Cruzeiro against Santos for 1968 Taça Brasil Cardoso disputed a ball with Pelé and he had ruptured a tendon in his knee. He spent 5 years out of professional football, working a youth coach at Cruzeiro, returning at field just in 1973.

As a manager, Cardoso managed Cruzeiro, Atlético Mineiro, Atlético Paranaense, Fluminense, Bahia and Internacional.

== Honours ==
=== Player ===
Atlético Mineiro

- Campeonato Mineiro (2): 1962, 1963

Cruzeiro

- Campeonato Mineiro (6): 1959, 1960, 1961, 1967, 1968, 1973
- Campeonato Brasileiro Série A (1): 1966

Fluminense

- Campeonato Carioca (1): 1964

Palmeiras

- Torneio Rio-São Paulo (1): 1965

=== Manager ===
Atlético Mineiro

- Copa Conmebol: 1992
- Campeonato Mineiro (3): 1978, 1979, 1980
