= Hassan Othman =

Sudanese footballer (died 2024)

Personal information
- Full name: Hassan Othman Mohamed Jibril
- Place of birth: Khartoum, Sudan
- Date of death: 10 October 2024
- Place of death: Doha, Qatar

Senior career*
Years	Team	Apps	(Gls)
1950s–1960s	Al Ahly		
1960s	Al Oruba		
- Al-Maref

Managerial career
- 1974–1977: Al Sadd
- 1979: Qatar
- 1982: Al Sadd
- 1984–1985: Al Sadd
- * Club domestic league appearances and goals

Hassan Othman, Alternatively spelled Hassan Osman also known as Hassan Daqdaq (Arabic: حسن عثمان), was a Sudanese football player and manager.

== Early life ==
Othman was born in Khartoum, Sudan.

== Playing career ==
He joined Al-Ahly in the mid-1950s and played until the early 1960s. At the time, Al-Ahly was a powerhouse filled with stars, including Samir Muhammad Ali—who later moved to Egypt’s Zamalek SC—Ibrahim Kabir, who captained the Sudanese national team for a time, and other standouts like Abdel Wahab Manzar, Saad Al-Fan, Al-Habbou, and Fouad Al-Sayed (brother of Faisal Estef of Al-Merreikh), who later transferred to Al-Hilal. Othman then later migrated to Qatar. Following this, he started playing for Al-Oruba, where he won 5 championships. He eventually moved to Al Sadd, transitioning into a coaching role.

== Managerial career ==
Othaman went on to serve as a Board Member, Sports Director, Youth Director, and Technical Supervisor, leading the team to a league title in the 1972/1973 season. He later joined Al-Sadd Club as head coach of the first team, where he guided them to victory in both the General League Championship and the Emir’s Cup as well as several championships. He also coached Qatar in the 1979 Gulf Cup.

== Personal life ==
His younger brothers also made significant contributions in their respective fields. Professor Ezz El-Din Osman El-Shater became one of the most renowned cartoonists in the region. Another sibling, Hashim Osman, is a journalist who began his career at Akhbar Al-Akhbar, owned by Nizar Awad Abdel Majeed, before moving to Akhir Lahza, a newspaper founded and overseen by Hassan Satti, with Mustafa Abu Al-Azaim as editor-in-chief. Hashim worked in the sports section alongside colleagues such as El-Hindi Ezz El-Din, Moamen El-Ghaly, and Mohamed Mahmoud Hassay, among others.

== Death ==
Othman died on 18 October 2024.

== Honours ==
=== Al-Oruba ===
- Qatari League:
  - Winners (5): 1966–67, 1967–68, 1968–69, 1969–70, 1970–71

=== Al-Sadd ===
- Emir of Qatar Cup:
  - Winners (3): 1977–78, 1984–85, 1985–86
- Sheikh Jassim Cup:
  - Winners (3): 1977, 1985, 1986
