= Qatar National First Division top scorers =

This article contains a list of players who have been the Qatari League top goal-scorers season by season, from the first official 1972–73 season up until the present on-going season. The first top goal-scorer of the official Qatari League was Awad Hassan who netted in 10 goals playing for Al-Esteqlal in the 1972–1973 season. While the player who holds the most league top goal-scorer awards is Mansour Muftah who has an impressive seven time record in the league.

Since the 2013–14 season, the award has been officially known as the Mansour Muftah Award to pay tribute to former Qatari player Mansour Muftah.

== List of Recipients ==
=== Top goal-scorers ===
Season	Player	Country	Club	Goals
1972-73	Awad Hassan	(Qatar)	Al-Esteqlal	10
1973-74	Mansour Muftah	(Qatar)	Al-Rayyan	15
1974-75	Not held			
1975-76	Jamal Al-Khatib	(Qatar) (Lebanon)	Al-Esteqlal	8
1976-77	Mansour Muftah	(Qatar)	Al-Rayyan	13
1977-78	Mansour Muftah	(Qatar)	Al-Rayyan	11
1978-79	Hassan Mattar	(Qatar)	Al-Sadd	11
1979-80	Sharif Abdul-Hamed; Badr Bilal; Hamdan Hamed; Mansour Muftah	(Egypt) (Qatar) (Qatar) (Qatar)	Al-Ahli; Al-Sadd Al-Esteqlal	5
1980-81	Hassan Mattar	(Qatar)	Al-Sadd	9
1981-82	Mansour Muftah	(Qatar)	Al-Rayyan	19
1982-83	Mansour Muftah	(Qatar)	Al-Rayyan	10
1983-84	Mansour Muftah	(Qatar)	Al-Rayyan	7
1984-85	Ahmed Yaqoub	(Qatar)	Al-Arabi	7
1985-86	Mansour Muftah	(Qatar)	Al-Rayyan	22
1986-87	Hassan Sabela	(Qatar)	Al-Ahli	9
1987-88	Hassan Jawhar	(Qatar)	Al-Sadd	11
1988-89	Farshad Pious	(Iran)	Al-Ahli	9
1989-90	Marquinho Carioca	(Brazil)	Al-Arabi	10
1990-91	Mahmoud Soufi; Adel Khamis; Hassan Sabela	(Qatar) (Qatar) (Qatar)	Al-Ittihad; Al-Gharafa Al-Ahli	10
1991-92	Mubarak Mustafa; Rabah Madjer	(Qatar) (Algeria)	Al-Arabi; Qatar SC	8
1992-93	Mubarak Mustafa	(Qatar)	Al-Arabi	9
1993-94	Ahmed Radhi	(Iraq)	Al Wakrah	12
1994-95	Mohammed Salem Al-Enazi	(Qatar)	Al-Rayyan	9
1995-96	Ricky Owubokiri	(Nigeria)	Al-Arabi	16
1996-97	Mubarak Mustafa; Alboury Lah	(Qatar) (Senegal)	Al-Arabi; Al-Ahli	11
1997-98	Hussein Amotta; Alboury Lah; Cláudio	(Morocco) (Senegal) (Brazil)	Al-Sadd; Al-Ahli; Al-Arabi	10
1998-99	Fabrice Akwa	(Angola)	Al-Wakrah	11
1999-2000	Mohammed Salem Al-Enazi	(Qatar)	Al-Rayyan	14
2000-01	Mamoun Diop	(Senegal)	Al-Wakrah	14
2001-02	Rachid Amrane	(Algeria)	Al-Ittihad	16
2002-03	Rachid Rokki	(Morocco)	Al Khor	15
2003-04	Gabriel Batistuta	(Argentina)	Al-Arabi	25
2004-05	Sonny Anderson	(Brazil)	Al-Rayyan	24
2005-06	Carlos Tenorio	(Ecuador)	Al-Sadd	21
2006-07	Younis Mahmoud	(Iraq)	Al-Gharafa	19
2007-08	Clemerson	(Brazil)	Al-Gharafa	27
2008-09	Magno Alves	(Brazil)	Umm Salal	25
2009-10	Younis Mahmoud; Cabore	(Iraq) (Brazil)	Al-Gharafa; Al-Arabi	21
2010-11	Younis Mahmoud	(Iraq)	Al-Gharafa	15
2011-12	Adriano	(Brazil)	El Jaish SC	18
2012-13	Sebastián Soria	(Qatar)	Lekhwiya SC	19
2013-14	Dioko Kaluyituka	(Democratic Republic of the Congo)	Al-Ahli	22
2014-15	Dioko Kaluyituka	(Democratic Republic of the Congo)	Al-Ahli	25
2015-16	Abderrazak Hamdallah; Rodrigo Tabata	(Morocco) (Qatar)	El Jaish; Al-Rayyan	21
2016-17	Youssef El-Arabi	(Morocco)	Al Duhail	24
2017-18	Youssef El-Arabi	(Morocco)	Al Duhail	26
2018-19	Baghdad Bounedjah	(Algeria)	Al-Sadd	39
2019-20	Akram Afif	(Qatar)	Al-Sadd	15
2020-21	Baghdad Bounedjah	(Algeria)	Al-Sadd	21
2021-22	Michael Olunga	(Kenya)	Al Duhail	24
2022-23	Michael Olunga	(Kenya)	Al Duhail	22
2023-24	Akram Afif	(Qatar)	Al-Sadd	26
2024-25	Róger Guedes	(Brazil)	Al-Rayyan	21
