= Mansour Muftah =

Qatari footballer (born 1955)

Personal information
- Full name: Mansour Muftah Faraj Bekhit Al-Abdullah
- Date of birth: 22 November 1955
- Place of birth: Doha, Qatar
- Height: 5 ft 3 in (1.60 m)
- Positions: Striker; winger

Youth career
- 1967–1972: Al-Rayyan Academy
- 1972–1973: Al-Rayyan

Senior career*
Years	Team	Apps	(Gls)
1974–1994	Al-Rayyan	216	(160)
1995–1998	Al-Wakrah	44	(19)
1999–2000	Al-Qadsiyah	19	(7)
Total		279	(186)

International career
1976–1993	Qatar	84	(48)
- * Club domestic league appearances and goals

Mansour Muftah Faraj Bekhit Al-Abdullah, or simply Mansour Muftah, alternatively spelled Mansoor Moftah (Arabic: منصور مفتاح فرج بخيت العبد الله, born 1955) is a former Qatari footballer who represented Qatar national team and Al-Rayyan as a striker. In 84 games for the national team, Muftah has scored 48 goals, In 2023, Almoez Ali overtook him as the top goal-scorer of the Qatar national team all-time top goal scorer. Additionally, Muftah played for Al-Rayyan for the majority of his club career. He scored 179 league goals in the Qatari League first division. Al-Rayyan became one of the leading teams in Qatari football during this period. Throughout his career, Muftah also finished as the Qatari League's top goal-scorer seven times.

== Early life ==
Mansour Muftah was born on 22 November 1955, in Doha, Qatar.

== Club career ==
=== Early career ===
Muftah attended the New Rayyan School; the school's football pitch was shared by Al Rayyan's first team. One day, he joined in on an Al Rayyan training session, and scored two goals in a training match, prompting head coach Ashour Salem to request him to join Al Rayyan's youth teams. Muftah initially rejected as he was a fan of Al Arabi, and was under pressure from his family to play for Al Arabi. Nonetheless, his brother-in-law presented him a contract with Al Rayyan, and he signed it without knowledge of the contents. Shortly after, his brother forced him into signing a contract binding him to Al Arabi. This caused the two respective clubs to involve the QFA, which offered him a chance to select between the two clubs. He chose to play for Al Rayyan, to the indignation of his brother. The following day, the Al Rayyan youth team secured a 3–1 victory over the Al Sadd youth team, with Muftah netting two goals. He then featured in a dominant 5–0 win against the Al Wakrah youth side. Continuing their strong form, Al Rayyan went on to defeat the Al Arabi youth team 3–1 in their next match.

=== Al-Rayyan (1974–1994) ===
Muftah broke into the senior squad at the age of nineteen. He played for Al-Rayyan from the years 1974 till 1994, during his tenure he became a club legend and one of their greatest-ever players.

He helped the team win six Qatari League titles, and was also the league’s top scorer on several occasions (1973–74, 1976–77, 1977–78, 1981–82, 1982–83, 1983–84, and 1985–86 seasons).

In the 1985–86 campaign of the Qatari League, Under his captainship, Muftah set a remarkable record by scoring 22 goals In just 12 appearances out of the teams total 34 goals, featuring in all of Rayyan's matches, he was declared the top goal-scorer of the league, scoring an average of 1.83 goals per game. Due to this feat, he became the first player to win the Arabian Golden Boot twice, first in the 1981–82, and the second in the 1985–86 season, he also contributed to Al-Rayyan’s victory in the Qatar Sheikh Jassem Cup in 1992.

=== Al-Wakrah (1995–1998) ===
In 1995, Muftah was set to join Al Sadd, but strong opposition from Al-Rayyan fans due to the fierce rivalry between the two clubs prevented the move. As a result, he signed with Al-Wakrah instead. He played with the team till 1998. During his tenure, He scored 19 goals in 44 matches, and won the Qatar Sheikh Jassem Cup in 1998. Muftah also guided his team reach the runners-up position in the 1994–95 Emir Cup, scoring in the final.

Muftah also notes regrettably when he scored the game-winning goal in a 1–0 victory over his old team, Al-Rayyan, Since they only needed a win or draw to be declared champions of the 1995–96 league season, The goal not only gave Al-Wakrah the victory but also allowed Al-Arabi to snatch the league title. Muftah later apologised for scoring in the game.

=== Al-Qadsiyah (1999–2000) ===
Towards the end of Mansour's footballing career, he joined Al-Qadsiyah (now known as Al-Sailiya), a club that participated in the Qatari Second Division. He joined in 1999 and played for the club for one season before retiring. He played 19 matches and scored 7 goals.

=== Transfer offers from abroad ===
Due to his performances at Al-Rayyan, Muftah received numerous transfer offers from clubs abroad such as Al-Nasr and Al Jazira, and most notably an offer from Al Hilal in 1981, where he would have played alongside Rivellino. However, the deal was never finalized.

== International career ==
=== Early years (1976–1982) ===
Muftah made his international debut in the 1976 Gulf Cup against Saudi Arabia. He scored four goals in six games in the tournament, including a two-minute brace against Bahrain. He then featured in the 1978 Asian Games scoring a brace to level the game against arch-rivals Saudi Arabia to enable a draw. He also featured in the 1979 Gulf Cup in Iraq, scoring a single goal against the UAE, and again in 1982 Gulf Cup. scoring a goal against Oman. He scored his first World cup qualifier goal in 1978 against Bahrain at the 40th minute resulting in a 2–0 win for Qatar.

=== International Success (1982–1988) ===
In the 1980s, Muftah played a key role in Qatar's participation in tournaments, with his most successful spree in the FIFA World Cup qualification in 1986 where he scored a hat-trick and a poker against Lebanon, however, both matches were counted as annulled. Another one of his memorable moments came in 1990 where he scored a header from a difficult angle against rivals Saudi Arabia in the 87' minute to salvage a draw, In the same qualifying stage he scored in the 87' minute after teammate Mahmoud Soufi who scored a few moments prior in the game against China to give Qatar the victory.

In 1981, he participated in the World Military Cup held in Qatar, helping his team finish as runners-up. From 1980 till 1986, the national team was coached by Evaristo de Macedo, who he describes as "undoubtedly the most influential person in his playing career". He scored the winner against Syria in the qualifying rounds which enabled Qatar to play at the men's tournament at the 1984 Summer Olympics.

=== Later years and captaincy (1988–1990) ===
In 1988, he scored two goals and attained three assists in the group stage of the 1988 AFC Asian Cup held in Qatar. After Qatar made an early exit, Muftah, who was the team captain, stated he felt humiliated for not at least reaching the knock-out stage. In a post-tournament interview, he apologized to the Qatari fans on behalf of the team. Despite losing in the group stages, he earned 45,000 QR for winning two of the games.

He retired from international football in 1990, due to differences with the coach, Dino Sani. Despite announcing international retirement, he returned to play in the 1994 FIFA World Cup qualification, marking his last few appearances for the national side.

In 2000, Muftah was selected for his last international match for Qatar, In which he retired, the match resulted in a 0–1 win for Egypt.

== Personal life ==
Muftah's brother, Faraj Muftah, was a former volleyball referee and player who played for the Al Rayyan Volleyball Team and the Qatar national volleyball team. Muftah's son, Tameem Mansour, is also a professional footballer who plays for Al-Rayyan as well as the Qatar national team.

== Legacy ==
Muftah is regarded as one of the best arab goal-scorers of his era. He was the first player to win the Arabian Golden Boot twice in 1981–82 and 1985–86, he was also an influential player for both club and country, contributing numerous goals and attacking plays. A record seven-time top scorer, he is also the all-time leading goal scorer in the Emir Cup with 36 goals and in the Sheikh Jassim Cup with 34 goals. Nicknamed "The Fox" due to his speed and ability to score from inside the box as well as with long-range shots alongside his dribbling skills, He reportedly scored 317 goals in 324 matches for both club and country.

from 2013–14 Qatar Stars League season onwards, the top goalscorer award was renamed to the "Mansour Muftah Award" in recognition of his outstanding contribution to Qatari football.

To honour his immense contributions to football in Qatar, Aspire Zone Pitch 7 was named after Muftah for the FIFA U-17 World Cup.

== Career statistics ==
Club	Season	QSL		GCC Champions League		Sheikh Jassim Cup		Qatar Emir Cup		AFC Champions League		Total	
Club	Season	Apps	Goals	Apps	Goals	Apps	Goals	Apps	Goals	Apps	Goals	Apps	Goals
Al-Rayyan	1975–76		12										
Al-Rayyan	1976–77		13										
Al-Rayyan	1977–78		11										
Al-Rayyan	1978–79		9										
Al-Rayyan	1979–80		5										
Al-Rayyan	1980–81		8										
Al-Rayyan	1981–82	12	18		6								
Al-Rayyan	1982–83		10										
Al-Rayyan	1983–84		7										
Al-Rayyan	1984–85		6		1								
Al-Rayyan	1985–86	12	22										
Al-Rayyan	1986–87		8										
Al-Rayyan	1987–88		4										
Al-Rayyan	1988–89		0										
Al-Rayyan	1989–90		6										
Al-Rayyan	1990–91		5										
Al-Rayyan	1991–92		7										
Al-Rayyan	1992–93		8						5				
Al-Rayyan	1994–93		1										
Career total		272	160		7		30+		30+		4		

Club	Season	QSL		Qatar Sheikh Jassem Cup		Crown Prince Cup		Qatar Emir Cup		Other		Total		
Club	Season	Apps	Goals	Apps	Goals	Apps	Goals	Apps	Goals	Apps	Goals	Apps	Goals	Assist
Al-Wakrah	1994–95		5	0	0	0	0	7	2	0	0	7	7	
Al-Wakrah	1995–96	16	6	4	3	3	2	2	1	0	0	25	12	
Al-Wakrah	1996–97	12	3	4	2	0	0	3	2	0	0	19	7	
Al-Wakrah	1997–98	6	0	1	1	0	0	0	0	0	0	7	1	
Al-Wakrah	1998–99	0	0	1	0	0	0	0	0	0	0	1	0	
Career total		62	14	10	6	3	2	12	5	0	0	87	27	

Club	Season	QSD		Qatar Sheikh Jassem Cup		Crown Prince Cup		Qatar Emir Cup		Other		Total		
Club	Season	Apps	Goals	Apps	Goals	Apps	Goals	Apps	Goals	Apps	Goals	Apps	Goals	Assist
Al-Sailiya	1999–00	19	7	0	0	0	0	4	4	0	0	13	4	
Career total		19	7	0	0	0	0	4	4	0	0	13	4	

== Honours ==
=== Club ===
- Al-Rayyan

- Qatari League (6): 1975–76, 1977–78, 1981–82, 1983–84, 1985–86, 1989–90.
- Sheikh Jassem Cup (1): 1992

- Al-Wakrah

- Sheikh Jassem Cup (1): 1998

=== International ===
- Qatar

- Arabian Gulf Cup runner-up (2): 1984, 1990
- World Military Cup runner-up (1): 1981

=== Individual ===
- Qatari League top goal-scorer (7): 1973–1974, 1976–1977, 1977–1978, 1981–1982, 1982–1983, 1983–1984, 1985–1986
- Qatari League highest goal average: 22 goals in 12 matches
- 1982 Gulf Club Champions Cup top goal-scorer: 6 goals
- Arabian Golden Boot (2): 1981-82, 1985–86
- AFC Asian All Stars (1): 1985
