= 1996–97 Qatar Stars League =

33rd season of top-tier football league in Qatar

Qatar Stars League
- Season: 1996–97
- Champions: Al-Arabi
- Asian Club Championship: Al-Arabi
- Top goalscorer: (Qatar) Mubarak Mustafa (Senegal) Alboury Lah (11 goals)

Statistics of Qatar Stars League for the 1996–97 season.

== Overview ==
It was contested by 9 teams, and Al-Arabi won the championship.

== Personnel ==
Team	Head coach
Al Ahli	
Al-Arabi	(Bosnia and Herzegovina) Džemaludin Mušović
Al-Ittihad	(Bosnia and Herzegovina) Džemal Hadžiabdić
Al-Rayyan	(Denmark) Benny Johansen
Al Sadd	(Morocco) Abdelkader Youmir
Al-Shamal	(England) Allan Jones
Al-Taawon	
Al-Wakrah	(Iraq) Adnan Dirjal
Qatar SC	(Sweden) Roland Andersson

== Foreign players ==
Team	Player 1	Player 2	Player 3	Former players
Al Ahli	(Senegal) Alboury Lah			
Al-Arabi	(Brazil) Cláudio Prates	(Iran) Ebrahim Ghasempour	(Morocco) Youssef Chippo	
Al-Ittihad	(Iraq) Jabbar Hashim	(Iraq) Radhi Shenaishil	(Senegal) Moussa N'Daw	
Al-Rayyan	(Kuwait) Abdullah Wabran	(Liberia) Alexander Freeman	(Morocco) Rachid Benmahmoud	(Iraq) Laith Hussein
Al Sadd	(Iran) Afshin Peyrovani	(Iran) Ali Daei	(Iraq) Samir Kadhim Hassan	
Al-Shamal				
Al-Taawon	(Iraq) Alaa Kadhim	(Iraq) Ali Wahaib Shnaiyn	(Iraq) Essam Hamad	
Al-Wakrah	(Iraq) Habib Jafar	(Iraq) Laith Hussein	(Liberia) Frank Seator	(Iraq) Ahmed Radhi
Qatar SC	(Guinea) Amadeu Nogueira	(Nigeria) Abdul Sule		

== League standings ==
Pos	Team	Pld	W	D	L	GF	GA	GD	Pts
1	Al-Arabi	16	10	4	2	28	13	+15	34
2	Al-Rayyan	16	9	5	2	21	12	+9	32
3	Al-Ittihad	16	8	5	3	22	14	+8	29
4	Al-Wakrah	16	8	3	5	23	16	+7	27
5	Al Sadd	16	7	6	3	19	9	+10	27
6	Al-Shamal	16	5	4	7	22	36	−14	19
7	Qatar SC	16	4	3	9	19	19	0	15
8	Al Ahli	16	1	6	9	18	31	−13	9
9	Al-Taawon	16	0	4	12	10	32	−22	4

Source: RSSSF
