= 1995–96 Qatar Stars League =

32nd season of top-tier football league in Qatar

Qatar Stars League
- Season: 1995–96
- Champions: Al-Arabi
- Asian Club Championship: Al-Rayyan
- Top goalscorer: (Nigeria) Ricky Owubokiri (16 goals)

Statistics of Qatar Stars League for the 1995–96 season.

== Overview ==
It was contested by 9 teams, and Al-Arabi won the championship.

== Personnel ==
Team	Head coach
Al Ahli	
Al-Arabi	(Brazil) Cláudio Galbo Garcia
Al-Ittihad	(Bosnia and Herzegovina) Džemal Hadžiabdić
Al-Rayyan	(Denmark) Benny Johansen
Al Sadd	(Brazil) Sebastião Rocha
Al-Shamal	(England) Allan Jones
Al-Taawon	(Sweden) Bosse Nilsson
Al-Wakrah	(Iraq) Adnan Dirjal
Qatar SC	(Sweden) Roland Andersson

== Foreign players ==
Team	Player 1	Player 2	Player 3	Former players
Al Ahli	(Senegal) Alboury Lah			
Al-Arabi	(Democratic Republic of the Congo) Blaise Nkufo	(Iran) Karim Bavi	(Nigeria) Ricky Owubokiri	(Brazil) Marquinho Carioca
Al-Ittihad	(Iraq) Habib Jafar	(Iraq) Radhi Shenaishil	(Morocco) Ahmed Bahja	
Al-Rayyan	(Iraq) Laith Hussein	(Morocco) Mouloud Moudakkar		
Al Sadd	(Iraq) Samir Kadhim Hassan	(South Africa) Pitso Mosimane		
Al-Shamal				
Al-Taawon	(Iraq) Alaa Kadhim			
Al-Wakrah	(Iraq) Ahmed Radhi	(Sudan) Akef Ataa		
Qatar SC	(Algeria) Nacer Bouiche	(Nigeria) Abdul Sule		

== League standings ==
Pos	Team	Pld	W	D	L	GF	GA	GD	Pts
1	Al-Arabi	16	11	3	2	34	20	+14	36
2	Al-Rayyan	16	11	2	3	28	11	+17	35
3	Al-Wakrah	16	11	2	3	29	17	+12	35
4	Al Sadd	16	9	7	0	24	9	+15	34
5	Al-Ittihad	15	4	4	7	22	21	+1	16
6	Al Ahli	15	4	2	9	15	27	−12	14
7	Al-Taawon	16	3	2	11	15	27	−12	11
8	Qatar SC	16	3	2	11	19	33	−14	11
9	Al-Shamal	16	2	2	12	14	37	−23	8

Source: RSSSF
