= 1997–98 Qatar Stars League =

34th season of top-tier football league in Qatar

Qatar Stars League
- Season: 1997–98
- Champions: Al-Ittihad
- Asian Club Championship: Al-Ittihad
- Top goalscorer: (Brazil) Cláudio Prates (Morocco) Hussein Ammouta (Senegal) Alboury Lah (11 goals)

Statistics of Qatar Stars League for the 1997–98 season.

== Overview ==
It was contested by 9 teams, and Al-Ittihad won the championship.

== Personnel ==
Team	Head coach
Al Ahli	(Morocco) Abdelkader Youmir
Al-Arabi	(Ukraine) Anatoliy Azarenkov
Al-Ittihad	(Bosnia and Herzegovina) Džemal Hadžiabdić
Al-Rayyan	(Poland) Zdzisław Podedworny
Al Sadd	(Algeria) Rabah Madjer
Al-Shamal	(England) Allan Jones
Al-Taawon	(Brazil) Alcides Romano Júnior
Al-Wakrah	(Iraq) Adnan Dirjal
Qatar SC	(Slovakia) Ján Pivarník

== Foreign players ==
Team	Player 1	Player 2	Former players
Al Ahli	(Ivory Coast) Moussa Traoré	(Senegal) Alboury Lah	
Al-Arabi	(Iran) Mojtaba Moharrami	(Iraq) Ahmed Radhi	(Iran) Ebrahim Ghasempour
Al-Ittihad	(Iraq) Radhi Shenaishil	(Morocco) Ahmed Bahja	
Al-Rayyan	(Kuwait) Abdullah Wabran		(Morocco) Mouloud Moudakkar (Nigeria) Isaac Okoronkwo
Al Sadd	(Brazil) Sérgio Ricardo	(Morocco) Hussein Ammouta	
Al-Shamal	(Brazil) Cláudio Prates	(Brazil) Regis	
Al-Taawon			(Iraq) Ali Wahaib Shnaiyn
Al-Wakrah	(Iraq) Habib Jafar	(Iraq) Samir Kadhim Hassan	
Qatar SC	(Guinea) Amadeu Nogueira		

== League standings ==
Pos	Team	Pld	W	D	L	GF	GA	GD	Pts
1	Al-Ittihad	16	10	5	1	23	13	+10	35
2	Al-Rayyan	16	9	2	5	20	14	+6	29
3	Al Sadd	16	7	5	4	25	13	+12	26
4	Al-Arabi	16	7	5	4	21	15	+6	26
5	Al Ahli	16	7	5	4	20	20	0	26
6	Qatar SC	16	5	4	7	17	22	−5	19
7	Al-Wakrah	16	5	3	8	20	19	+1	18
8	Al-Taawon	16	3	3	10	17	29	−12	12
9	Al-Shamal	16	3	2	11	16	34	−18	11

Source: RSSSF
