= List of Akademisk Boldklub players =

Akademisk Boldklub are a Danish professional association football club based in Copenhagen, who currently play in the Danish 1st Division. They have played at their current home ground, the Gladsaxe Stadium, since 1938, but were founded much earlier, in 1889. They were one of the founding clubs of the Football Tournament in 1889. Since that time the club's first team has competed in numerous nationally and internationally organised competitions.

All players who have played in 25 or more such matches are listed below. Players are listed according to the date of their first professional contract signed with the club. Appearances and goals are for first-team competitive matches only; wartime matches are excluded, substitute appearances are included.

The all-time appearance record is held by former Denmark international sweeper René Henriksen, who amassed 339 appearances in two spells with the club, first from 1988 to 1999, and then for one further season in 2005–06 after a six-season tenure in Greece with Panathinaikos. Despite playing in a defensive role, Henriksen also holds the goalscoring record, with 42 goals. His nearest challenger in either field is former Nigeria international striker Abdul Sule, with 137 appearances and 30 goals between 2000 and 2004. Nicolai Stokholm also has 137 appearances.

== List of players ==
Name	Nationality	Position	Akademisk Boldklub career	Appearances	Goals
René Henriksen	Denmark	Defender	1988–1999; 2005–2006	339	42
Kenneth Perez	Denmark	Midfielder	1993–1995	36	7
Michael Madsen	Denmark	Defender	1996–1998	46	6
Peter Løvenkrands	Denmark	Midfielder	1998–2000	32	7
Tommy Løvenkrands	Denmark	Midfielder	1998–2000	32	3
Brian Steen Nielsen	Denmark	Midfielder	1998–2001	84	10
Nicolai Stokholm	Denmark	Midfielder	1998–2003	137	14
Mohamed Zidan	Egypt	Striker	1999–2003	51	12
Rasmus Green	Denmark	Midfielder	2000–2003	43	2
Abdul Sule	Nigeria	Striker	2000–2004	137	30
Nicolai Melchiorsen	Denmark	Midfielder	2003–2005	27	0
Prince Nana Takyi	Ghana	Striker	2003–2008	33	12
Samuel Agba	Nigeria	Striker	2006–2007	28	0
Poul Hübertz	Denmark	Striker	2008–2009	29	14
Andreas Sørensen	Denmark	Defender	2008–2010	47	2
Casper Henningsen	Denmark	Midfielder	2009–	57	10
Nicolai Jørgensen	Denmark	Midfielder	2009–2010	32	9
Steen Träger	Denmark	Defender	2000–2005	134	5
Philip Oslev	Burundi	Defender	2018–	60	2
