= 1998–99 Qatar Stars League =

35th season of top-tier football league in Qatar

Qatar Stars League
- Season: 1998–99
- Champions: Al-Wakrah
- Asian Club Championship: Al-Wakrah
- Top goalscorer: (Angola) Akwá (11 goals)

Statistics of Qatar Stars League for the 1998–99 season.

== Overview ==
It was contested by nine teams, and Al-Wakrah won the league.

== Personnel ==
Team	Head coach
Al Ahli	(Iran) Heshmat Mohajerani
Al-Arabi	(Denmark) Roald Poulsen
Al-Ittihad	(Bosnia and Herzegovina) Džemal Hadžiabdić
Al-Rayyan	(Denmark) Jørgen E. Larsen
Al Sadd	(Brazil) Procópio Cardoso
Al-Shamal	(Iraq) Adnan Dirjal
Al-Taawon	(Brazil) Roberto Carlos
Al-Wakrah	(Algeria) Rabah Madjer
Qatar SC	(Germany) Reinhard Fabisch

== Foreign players ==
Team	Player 1	Player 2	Player 3	Former players
Al Ahli	(Ivory Coast) Moussa Traoré			
Al-Arabi	(Ghana) Foster Bastios			(Brazil) Regis
Al-Ittihad	(Bahrain) Mohamed Husain	(Brazil) Osvaldo	(Liberia) Frank Seator	
Al-Rayyan	(Kuwait) Abdullah Wabran	(Tunisia) Riadh Jelassi		
Al Sadd	(Brazil) Sérgio Ricardo	(Morocco) Hussein Ammouta		
Al-Shamal	(Brazil) Regis			
Al-Taawon	(Iraq) Qahtan Chathir			
Al-Wakrah	(Angola) Akwá			
Qatar SC	(Hungary) József Duró	(Iraq) Samir Kadhim Hassan		

== Final league table ==
Pos	Team	Pld	W	D	L	GF	GA	GD	Pts
1	Al-Wakrah	16	12	3	1	36	16	+20	39
2	Al-Ittihad	16	10	4	2	32	11	+21	34
3	Al Sadd	16	10	3	3	29	15	+14	33
4	Al-Arabi	16	6	5	5	24	13	+11	23
5	Al-Rayyan	16	6	5	5	29	23	+6	23
6	Qatar SC	16	5	2	9	16	27	−11	17
7	Al Ahli	16	4	3	9	22	31	−9	15
8	Al-Taawon	16	2	3	11	17	38	−21	9
9	Al-Shamal	16	1	4	11	21	52	−31	7

Source: RSSSF

== Statistics ==
=== First round ===
Obtained from daharchives

==== Goal statistics ====
- Total goals scored: 112
- Fastest goal: (Qatar) Mohammed Salem Al-Enazi (1:45)
- Top goalscorers: (Angola) Akwá (11 goals)

==== General statistics ====
- Most 'Man of the Match' awards: (Qatar) Mubarak Mustafa
