= Qatar Cup =

- Founded: 1994; 32 years ago
- Region: Qatar
- Teams: 4
- Current champions: Al Sadd (9th title)
- Most championships: Al Sadd (9 titles)
- Website: qsl.qa/cup
- 2025 Qatar Cup

The Qatar Cup (formerly known as Qatar Crown Prince Cup) is a tournament in men's football. It is played by the top 4 teams of the Qatar Stars League after each season. In 2013, the tournament was renamed Qatar Cup.

== Previous winners ==
Season	Winners	Score	Runners–up
1995	Al-Rayyan	1–0	Al-Arabi
1996	Al-Rayyan	2–0	Al-Wakrah
1997	Al-Arabi	0–0 (a.s.d.e.t) (4–3p)	Al-Rayyan
1998	Al-Sadd	3–2	Al-Arabi
1999	Al-Wakrah	2–1 (a.e.t)	Al-Ittihad
2000	Al-Ittihad	0–0 (a.e.t) (9–8p)	Al-Rayyan
2001	Al-Rayyan	5–0	Al-Arabi
2002	Qatar SC	2–0	Al-Ittihad
2003	Al-Sadd	2–0	Al-Ittihad
2004	Qatar SC	2–1 (a.e.t)	Al-Sadd
2005	Al-Khor	2–1	Al-Gharafa
2006	Al-Sadd	2–1	Qatar SC
2007	Al-Sadd	2–1	Al-Gharafa
2008	Al-Sadd	1–0	Al-Gharafa
2009	Qatar SC	0–0 (a.e.t) (4–2p)	Al-Rayyan
2010	Al-Gharafa	5–0	Al-Arabi
2011	Al-Gharafa	2–0	Al-Arabi
2012	Al-Rayyan	1–1 (a.e.t) (5–4p)	Al-Sadd
2013	Lekhwiya	3–2	Al-Sadd
2014	El Jaish	1–1 (a.e.t) (4–3p)	Lekhwiya
2015	Lekhwiya	1–0	El Jaish
2016	El Jaish	2–1	Lekhwiya
2017	Al-Sadd	2–1	El Jaish
2018	Al-Duhail	2–1	Al-Sadd
2019	Not Held		
2020	Al-Sadd	4–0	Al-Duhail
2021	Al-Sadd	2–0	Al-Duhail
2022	Not Held		
2023	Al-Duhail	2–0	Al-Sadd
2024	Al-Wakrah	1–0	Al-Rayyan
2025	Al-Sadd	2–2 (a.e.t) (4–3p)	Al-Duhail
2026	Not Held		

== All-time top scorers ==
Rank	Nat	Name	Club	Goals
1	(Iraq)	Younis Mahmoud	Al-Gharafa, Al Sadd, Al-Arabi, Al-Khor, Al-Wakrah	11
2	(Qatar)	Nasser Kamil	Al-Rayyan	10
3	(South Korea)	Nam Tae-hee	Al-Duhail, Al Sadd	9
4	(Qatar)	Mohammed Salem Al-Enazi	Al-Rayyan	8
5	(Angola)	Akwá	Al-Gharafa, Al-Wakrah	7

== Top-performing clubs ==
Club	Champions
Al-Sadd	9
Al-Rayyan	4
Al-Duhail	4
Qatar SC	3
Al-Gharafa	3
El Jaish	2
Al-Wakrah	2
Al-Arabi	1
Al-Khor	1
