= Muhannad Darjal =

Iraqi footballer

Personal information
- Full name: Muhannad Adnan Darjal
- Date of birth: 1 January 1986 (age 40)
- Place of birth: Iraq
- Position: Defender

Senior career*
Years	Team	Apps	(Gls)
2007–2010	Al-Markhiya		
2010–2011	Al-Khor		
2011–2013	Al-Wakra		
2013	Al-Rayyan		
2013–2015	Al-Wakra		
2015–2016	Al-Mesaimeer		
2016–2017	Al-Shahania		
2017–2018	Al-Wakra		
2018–2019	Al-Shamal		
- * Club domestic league appearances and goals

Muhannad Adnan Darjal (Arabic: مهند عدنان درجال) (born 1 January 1986) is an Iraqi footballer who plays as a defender.

== Personal life ==
He is the son of the famous defender Adnan Dirjal.
