= 1973–74 Qatar Stars League =

11th season of top-tier football league in Qatar

Qatar Stars League
- Season: 1973–74

Statistics of Qatar Stars League for the 1973–74 season.

== Overview ==
Al-Sadd Sports Club won the championship.

== Top scorers ==
Scorer	Club	Goals
(Qatar) Mansour Muftah	Al-Rayyan	15
