= 1990–91 Qatar Stars League =

27th season of top-tier football league in Qatar

Qatar Stars League
- Season: 1990–91
- Champions: Al-Arabi
- Asian Club Championship: Al-Arabi
- Top goalscorer: (Qatar) Adel Khamis (Qatar) Hassan Sabela (Qatar) Mahmoud Soufi (10 goals)

Statistics of Qatar Stars League for the 1990–91 season.

== Overview ==
Al-Arabi won the championship.

== Personnel ==
Team	Head coach
Al Ahli	(Socialist Federal Republic of Yugoslavia) Zoran Đorđević
Al-Arabi	(Brazil) Luis Alberto
Al-Ittihad	(Brazil) Celso Roth
Al-Rayyan	(Brazil) René Simões
Al Sadd	(Brazil) Silas
Al-Shamal	
Al-Taawon	
Al-Wakrah	(Brazil) Flamarion
Qatar SC	(Bosnia and Herzegovina) Džemaludin Mušović

== Foreign players ==
Team	Player 1	Player 2	Former players
Al Ahli			
Al-Arabi	(Brazil) Marquinho Carioca		
Al-Ittihad	(Iran) Morteza Kermani Moghaddam		
Al-Rayyan			
Al Sadd	(Brazil) Luisinho Lemos	(Iran) Ebrahim Ghasempour	(Iran) Majid Namjoo-Motlagh
Al-Shamal			
Al-Taawon			
Al-Wakrah	(Iran) Bijan Taheri		
Qatar SC	(Iran) Abdolreza Barzegari	(Iran) Hamid Derakhshan	
