= Thomas Abel =

Thomas Abel may refer to:

- Thomas Abel (martyr) or Abell (c. 1497–1540), English priest
- Thomas Abel (footballer) (born 1974), Danish association football player
- Tom Abel (cosmologist) (born 1970), German cosmologist
- Tom Abel (cricketer) (1890–1937), English cricketer

== See also ==
- Tom Abell (born 1994), English cricketer
- Tom Abele Jr. (born 1989), American stock car racing driver
