= 1994–95 Qatar Stars League =

31st season of top-tier football league in Qatar

Qatar Stars League
- Season: 1994–95
- Champions: Al-Rayyan
- Asian Club Championship: Al-Rayyan
- Top goalscorer: (Qatar) Mohammed Salem Al-Enazi (9 goals)

Statistics of the Qatar Stars League for 1994–95 season.

== Overview ==
It was contested by 9 teams, and Al-Rayyan won the league.

== Personnel ==
Team	Head coach
Al Ahli	(Bosnia and Herzegovina) Faruk Pašić
Al-Arabi	(Brazil) Oswaldo de Oliveira
Al-Ittihad	(Bosnia and Herzegovina) Džemal Hadžiabdić
Al-Rayyan	(Denmark) Jørgen E. Larsen
Al Sadd	(Bosnia and Herzegovina) Džemaludin Mušović
Al-Shamal	
Al-Taawon	
Al-Wakrah	(Brazil) José Paulo
Qatar SC	(Iraq) Hazem Jassam

== Foreign players ==
Team	Player 1	Player 2	Former players
Al Ahli			
Al-Arabi	(Brazil) Marquinho Carioca	(Iran) Karim Bavi	
Al-Ittihad	(Iran) Morteza Kermani Moghaddam	(Iraq) Radhi Shenaishil	
Al-Rayyan	(Iraq) Laith Hussein		
Al Sadd	(Iraq) Samir Kadhim Hassan		
Al-Shamal			
Al-Taawon	(Iraq) Alaa Kadhim		
Al-Wakrah	(Iraq) Ahmed Radhi		
Qatar SC	(Iraq) Habib Jafar		
