= Jørgen Larsen =

Jørgen Larsen may refer to:

- Jørgen Strand Larsen (born 2000), Norwegian football forward
- Jørgen E. Larsen (1945–2020), Danish football coach and player
- Jørgen Bent Larsen (1935–2010), Danish chess grandmaster and author
