= Sami Habib Beldi =

Algerian footballer (born 1998)

Sami Beldi سامي بلدي
Personal information
- Full name: Sami Beldi
- Date of birth: 23 September 1998 (age 28)
- Place of birth: Annaba, Algeria
- Height: 1.86 m (6 ft 1 in)
- Position: Goalkeeper

Team information
- Current team: Al-Rayyan
- Number: 23

Youth career
- Al-Duhail

Senior career*
| Years | Team | Apps | (Gls) |
| 2017–2019 | Al-Duhail | 0 | (0) |
| 2019–2024 | Umm Salal | 17 | (0) |
| 2024– | Al-Rayyan | 0 | (0) |
- * Club domestic league appearances and goals as of 09:00, June 15, 2023 (EST)

Sami Beldi (Arabic: سامي بلدي; born 23 September 1998) is an Algerian professional footballer who plays as a goalkeeper for Qatar Stars League side Al-Rayyan.

== Career statistics ==
=== Club ===
As of 24 December 2020.

| Club | Season | League | | | Cup | | Continental | | Other | | Total | |
| Club | Season | Division | Apps | Goals | Apps | Goals | Apps | Goals | Apps | Goals | Apps | Goals |
|---|---|---|---|---|---|---|---|---|---|---|---|---|
| Al-Duhail | 2017–18 | Qatar Stars League | 0 | 0 | 2 | 0 | — | | — | | 2 | 0 |
| Al-Duhail | 2018–19 | Qatar Stars League | 0 | 0 | 2 | 0 | — | | — | | 2 | 0 |
| Al-Duhail | Total | | 0 | 0 | 4 | 0 | 0 | 0 | 0 | 0 | 4 | 0 |
| Umm Salal | 2019–20 | Qatar Stars League | 0 | 0 | 1 | 0 | — | | — | | 1 | 0 |
| Umm Salal | 2020–21 | Qatar Stars League | 2 | 0 | 3 | 0 | — | | — | | 5 | 0 |
| Career totals | | | 2 | 0 | 8 | 0 | 0 | 0 | 0 | 0 | 10 | 0 |
