= 1976–77 Qatar Stars League =

13th season of top-tier football league in Qatar

Qatar Stars League
- Season: 1976–77

Statistics of Qatar Stars League for the 1976–77 season.

== Overview ==
Al-Esteqlal won the championship.

== Top scorers ==
Scorer	Club	Goals
(Qatar) Mansour Muftah	Al-Rayyan	15
