= 1964–65 Qatar Stars League =

2nd season of top-tier football league in Qatar

Qatar Stars League
- Season: 1964–65

Statistics of Qatar Stars League for the 1964–65 season.

== Overview ==
Al-Maaref won the championship.
