= 1981–82 Arab Club Champions Cup =

بطولة الأندية العربية لأبطال الدوري 1981–82

Tournament details
- Dates: 19 June 1981 – 7 February 1982
- Teams: 3 (from 1 association)

Final positions
- Champions: (Iraq) Al-Shorta (1st title)
- Runners-up: (Lebanon) Al-Nejmeh

Tournament statistics
- Matches played: 4
- Goals scored: 9 (2.25 per match)
- Top scorer(s): (Iraq) Ali Hussein Mahmoud (Qatar) Jamal Al-Khatib (Lebanon) Hassan Chatila (2 goals each)

The 1981–82 Arab Club Champions Cup was the first edition of the Arab Club Champions Cup. The tournament featured three teams, after the withdrawal of South Yemeni club Al-Tilal, Saudi club Al-Nassr and Somali club Horseed.

Iraqi club Al-Shorta were crowned champions after a playoff victory against Lebanese side Al-Nejmeh. Al-Ahli of Jordan were the other team to take part.

== Teams ==
Participants

Team	Qualifying method
(Iraq) Al-Shorta	1979–80 Iraqi National League champions
(Jordan) Al-Ahli	1979 Jordan League champions
(Lebanon) Al-Nejmeh	1974–75 Lebanese Premier League champions (most recent Lebanese championship)

Withdrawals

Team	Qualifying method
(South Yemen) Al-Tilal	1979–80 South Yemeni League champions
(Saudi Arabia) Al-Nassr	1979–80 Saudi Premier League champions
(Somalia) Horseed	1979–80 Somali First Division champions

== Semi-finals ==
The six teams were originally drawn into two groups, with one group consisting of Al-Nejmeh, Al-Ahli and Al-Tilal, and the other group consisting of Al-Shorta, Horseed and Al-Nassr. However, Al-Nassr withdrew due to several of their players being unavailable on international duty, and Al-Tilal also withdrew.

A two-legged semi-final was therefore set up between Al-Nejmeh and Al-Ahli, with both matches being held at Amman International Stadium in Amman, Jordan due to the Lebanese Civil War.

Horseed were scheduled to travel to Baghdad on 2 February to play Al-Shorta in the other semi-final, but they withdrew, meaning that Al-Shorta qualified directly for the final.

Team 1	Agg.	Team 2	1st leg	2nd leg
Al-Nejmeh (Lebanon)	2–1	(Jordan) Al-Ahli	2–1	0–0
Al-Shorta (Iraq)	(w/o) ^{1}	(Somalia) Horseed	—	—

^{1} Horseed withdrew from the tournament.

19 June 1981

Al-Nejmeh (Lebanon)	2–1	(Jordan) Al-Ahli
Al-Khatib 8'; Chatila 37'		Salamah 24'

Amman International Stadium, Amman
21 June 1981

Al-Ahli (Jordan)	0–0	(Lebanon) Al-Nejmeh

Amman International Stadium, Amman

== Final ==
Both legs of the final were held at Al-Shaab Stadium in Baghdad, Iraq due to the Lebanese Civil War.

Team 1	Agg.	Team 2	1st leg	2nd leg
Al-Shorta (Iraq)	4–2	(Lebanon) Al-Nejmeh	2–0	2–2

=== First leg ===
Al-Nejmeh's kits and boots were lost at the airport and did not arrive in Baghdad in time for the first leg, therefore Al-Shorta provided kits and boots to the Al-Nejmeh team to wear for the match. Al-Nejmeh wore red shirts with white shorts and black boots (except for the player Mohammed Hatoum who wore white boots), while Al-Shorta wore green shirts with white shorts and green socks.

Al-Shorta took the lead in the 40th minute; Mahmoud Hussein Mahmoud beat an Al-Nejmeh player on the right wing and sent in a cross which his brother Ali Hussein Mahmoud met with a header, sending the ball over Al-Nejmeh goalkeeper Zain Hashim and into the net. Ali Hussein Mahmoud scored his second goal in the 83rd minute, as he was sent through on goal and netted with a left-footed shot towards the near post from inside the penalty area. The Kuwaiti referee also awarded Al-Shorta a penalty in the match, but it was missed by Ali Hussein Mahmoud, and the match ended 2–0.

5 February 1982

Al-Shorta (Iraq)	2–0	(Lebanon) Al-Nejmeh
Mahmoud 40', 83'

Al-Shaab Stadium, Baghdad

=== Second leg ===
Al-Nejmeh wore orange shirts, black shorts and orange socks for the second leg, and the Lebanese side took the lead in the first half through Jamal Al-Khatib who got onto the end of a corner delivered by Al-Nejmeh's captain and struck the ball past goalkeeper Raad Hammoudi. Al-Shorta equalised in the first half when Riyadh Nouri bundled the ball over the line after an Al-Nejmeh defender had made a goal-line block. Al-Nejmeh took the lead again in the second half when Hassan Chatila scored with a shot from outside the penalty area, but Al-Shorta brought the game back level and restored their two-goal aggregate advantage when Tariq Abdul-Amir crossed the ball into the box for Salih Radhi to finish.

Al-Nejmeh player Jamal Al-Khatib suffered a dislocated hip during the match, which ended 2–2, therefore making Al-Shorta 4–2 winners on aggregate. Al-Shorta manager Douglas Aziz was presented with the trophy after the game.

7 February 1982

Al-Nejmeh (Lebanon)	2–2	(Iraq) Al-Shorta
Al-Khatib; Chatila		Nouri; Radhi

Al-Shaab Stadium, Baghdad
Referee: Ahmed Al-Safar (Kuwait)

== Winner ==
1981–82 Arab Club Champions Cup
Winners

Al-Shorta
1st Title

== Top goalscorers ==
Rank	Player	Team	Goals
1	(Iraq) Ali Hussein Mahmoud	(Iraq) Al-Shorta	2
1	(Qatar) Jamal Al-Khatib	(Lebanon) Al-Nejmeh	2
1	(Lebanon) Hassan Chatila	(Lebanon) Al-Nejmeh	2
4	(Jordan) Shaker Salamah	(Jordan) Al-Ahli	1
4	(Iraq) Riyadh Nouri	(Iraq) Al-Shorta	1
4	(Iraq) Salih Radhi	(Iraq) Al-Shorta	1
