= 1995 Qatar Crown Prince Cup =

1995 Crown Prince Cup
Heir Apparent Cup

Tournament details
- Host country: Qatar
- Teams: 4

Final positions
- Champions: Al-Rayyan (1st title)

The 1995 Qatar Crown Prince Cup was the 1st edition of this cup tournament in men's football (soccer). It was played by the top 4 teams of the Q-League: Al-Rayyan, Al-Arabi, Al-Ittihad (known today as Al-Gharafa SC), and Al-Shama.

Al-Rayyan were crowned champions defeating Al-Arabi in the final.

== Results ==
Semi-finals
(Qatar)	Al-Rayyan	2	4	6
(Qatar)	Al-Shamal	0	1	1
(Qatar)	Al-Ittihad	2	0	2
(Qatar)	Al-Arabi	1	3	4

Final
(Qatar)	Al-Rayyan	1
(Qatar)	Al-Arabi	0

1995 Qatar Crown Prince Cup
Winners
Al-Rayyan
1st Title
