= Prince Nana (footballer) =

Danish-Ghanaian footballer (born 1983)

Personal information
- Full name: Prince Nana Takyi
- Date of birth: 16 March 1983 (age 43)
- Place of birth: Kumasi, Ghana
- Height: 1.84 m (6 ft 1/2 in)
- Position: Forward

Youth career
- 1997–2001: University of Ghana

Senior career*
Years	Team	Apps	(Gls)
2001–2003	KB	27	(3)
2003–2008	AB	33	(12)
2008	Køge BK	6	(0)
2009	HIK	3	(0)
2009	BK Frem	8	(0)
- * Club domestic league appearances and goals

Prince Nana Takyi (born 16 March 1983 in Kumasi) is a Danish-Ghanaian former football player in the striker position. He played for Akademisk Boldklub in the Danish Superliga championship, and played professionally for a number of Danish clubs in the Danish 1st Division, and was named 2008 Best African Footballer in Denmark. He ended his career in February 2010 due to injuries. Nana received a Danish citizenship in February 2008.

Nana started his senior career in Danish football, playing in Kjøbenhavns Boldklub (KB), the reserve team of multiple Danish champions F.C. Copenhagen. He later joined Akademisk Boldklub (AB), playing in the Danish Superliga championship. He made his Superliga debut in a 2–1 win against BK Frem on 31 August 2003. In February 2004, Nana was poised to replace departing strikers Heine Fernandez and Abdul Sule in the AB starting line-up, but he suffered a ruptured Achilles tendon in April 2004. He only played that one game, as AB ended in last place of the 2003-04 Danish Superliga season and was relegated to the Danish 1st Division.

He stayed with AB in the 1st Division, and scored a hat-trick for AB in a 4–1 win against BK Frem on 1 October 2006. AB coach Christian Andersen emphasized Nana as the profile of the AB team in March 2007, likening him to Adriano Leite Ribeiro. Nana suffered a knee injury in April 2007, and was out for the rest of the year. He never fully recovered, and Nana left AB in July 2008, and signed with Køge BK. In November 2008, Nana received the 2008 Best African Footballer in Denmark award. After half a year at Køge, Nana signed with Hellerup IK in January 2009. He moved to Boldklubben Frem in July 2009, to play under his former coach Christian Andersen. Nana suffered further injuries, and decided to end his career in February 2010.

== Honours ==
- 2008: Best African Footballer in Denmark
