= 1975–76 Qatar Stars League =

12th season of top-tier football league in Qatar

Qatar Stars League
- Season: 1975–76

Statistics of Qatar Stars League for the 1975–76 season.

== Overview ==
Al-Rayyan Sports Club won the championship.

== Top scorers ==
Rank	Scorer	Club	Goals
1	(Qatar) (Lebanon) Jamal Al-Khatib	Al-Esteqlal	13
2	(Qatar) Mansour Muftah	Al-Rayyan	12
