= 1996 Qatar Crown Prince Cup =

1996 Crown Prince Cup
Heir Apparent Cup

Tournament details
- Host country: Qatar
- Teams: 4

Final positions
- Champions: Al-Rayyan (2nd title)

The 1996 Qatar Crown Prince Cup was the second edition of this cup tournament in men's football (soccer). It was played by the top 4 teams of the Q-League.

Al-Rayyan were crowned champions for the second season running and would therefore enter the next edition on the Asian Club Championship, which was previously reserved for the regular season league winners. Al-Wakrah, who lost in the final would enter the next edition of the Gulf Club Championship.

== Results ==
Semi-finals
(Qatar)	Al-Wakrah	3	1	4
(Qatar)	Al-Sadd	1	1	2
(Qatar)	Al-Arabi	1	1	2
(Qatar)	Al-Rayyan	1	2	3

Final
(Qatar)	Al-Wakrah	0
(Qatar)	Al-Rayyan	2

1996 Qatar Crown Prince Cup
Winners
Al-Rayyan
2nd Title

== Match details ==
=== Final ===
9 April 1996

Al-Wakrah	0 – 2	Al-Rayyan
		Zamel Al-Kuwari; Mohammed Salem Al-Enazi

Khalifa International Stadium, Doha
Attendance: 10,000
