= 1965–66 Qatar Stars League =

3rd season of top-tier Qatari football

Qatar Stars League
- Season: 1965–66

Statistics of Qatar Stars League for the 1965–66 season.

== Overview ==
Al-Maaref won the championship.
