= 1963–64 Q-League =

1st season of top-tier football league in Qatar

Qatar Stars League
- Season: 1963–64

Statistics of Qatar Stars League for the 1963–64 season.

== Overview ==
Al-Maaref won the championship.
