= Alexander Freeman (footballer) =

Liberian footballer

Personal information
- Full name: Alexander Freeman
- Date of birth: 3 January 1972 (age 54)
- Place of birth: Monrovia, Liberia
- Position: Midfielder

Senior career*
| Years | Team | Apps | (Gls) |
| 1988–1994 | Invincible Eleven | | |
| 1994–1995 | Al-Nassr | | |
| 1995–1996 | Kelantan FA | | |
| 1996–1997 | Al-Rayyan | | |
| 1997–1998 | Perlis FA | | |
| 1999–2001 | Selangor FA | | |
| 2002–2003 | PSMS Medan | | |

International career
| 1988–1996 | Liberia | | |
- * Club domestic league appearances and goals as of 13:42, 9 December 2007 (UTC)

Alexander Freeman (born 3 January 1970) is a former Liberian professional footballer.

A prominent midfielder, Freeman played for Kelantan FA, Perlis FA, and Selangor FA in the Malaysian League. He was also a Liberia national football team player from 1988 to 1996 and competed in the 1996 African Cup of Nations.
