= 1977–78 Qatar Stars League =

14th season of top-tier football league in Qatar

Qatar Stars League
- Season: 1977–78

Statistics of Qatar Stars League for the 1977–78 season.

== Overview ==
Al-Rayyan Sports Club won the championship.

== Top scorers ==
Scorer	Club	Goals
(Qatar) Mansour Muftah	Al-Rayyan	11
