= Samuel Agba =

Nigerian football player (born 1986)

Personal information
- Date of birth: 12 June 1986 (age 40)
- Place of birth: Iseyin, Nigeria
- Height: 1.78 m (5 ft 10 in)
- Positions: Midfielder; left-back

Youth career
- Entente Lomé

Senior career*
Years	Team	Apps	(Gls)
2006–2007	AB	28	(0)
2007	→ Ølstykke (loan)	16	(0)
2008	Esbjerg fB	0	(0)
2009–2011	BSV		
2012	Greve		
2012–2013	Helsingør		
2013–2014	BSV		
2014	Skovshoved		
- * Club domestic league appearances and goals

Samuel Agba (born 12 June 1986) is a Nigerian former professional footballer who played as a midfielder.

== Career ==
Agba started his professional career in Denmark with Akademisk Boldklub, after having joined from Togolese club Entente Lomé, where he was known under the name Amindi Kalu. A short loan to Ølstykke followed in 2007, before signing with Esbjerg fB in 2008. He joined BSV in January 2009. In January 2012 he began playing lower-level football with Greve Fodbold. In July 2012 he signed a contract with FC Helsingør. He then played for BSV again between 2013 and 2014.

== Style of play ==
A predominantly left-footed player, Agba has been described as technically skilled and physically strong, with a high work-rate, who was able to cover several positions.
