= Jabbar Hashim =

Iraqi footballer

Personal information
- Date of birth: 1 January 1970 (age 56)
- Place of birth: Iraq
- Position: Defender

Team information
- Current team: Al-Quwa Al-Jawiya (Assist.)

Senior career*
Years	Team	Apps	(Gls)
1989–1991	Al-Talaba SC		
1991–1996	Al-Quwa Al-Jawiya		
1996–1997	Al-Gharafa SC		
1997–1999	Dibba Al-Hisn Sports Club		
1999–2007	Al-Quwa Al-Jawiya		

International career
1993–2001	Iraq	30	(2)

Managerial career
- 2016: Al-Shorta SC (Assist.)
- 2016–2017: Iraq (Assist.)
- 2017–2018: Al-Quwa Al-Jawiya (Assist.)
- 2018–2020: Naft Al-Wasat SC (Assist.)
- 2021: Naft Maysan FC (Assist.)
- 2021–: Al-Quwa Al-Jawiya (Assist.)
- * Club domestic league appearances and goals

Abdul-Jabbar Hashim Hanoon (Arabic: عَبْد الْجَبَّار هَاشِم حَنُّون; born 1 January 1970) is an Iraqi football defender who played for the Iraq national football team in the 2000 Asian Cup. He also played for Al-Quwa Al-Jawiya.

Jabar Hashim was one of the great stalwarts of Iraqi football and the national team during the 1990s. He was regular in the national team during Iraq's 1994 World Cup qualifying campaign.

Jabar played at the 2000 Asian Cup in Lebanon, where he was heavily criticised for his performances, which later resulted in being dropped for the World Cup qualifiers by Milan Zivadinovic.
