= Alboury Lah =

Senegalese footballer

Personal information
- Full name: Alboury Lah
- Date of birth: 23 April 1966 (age 60)
- Place of birth: Thiès, Senegal
- Height: 1.82 m (5 ft 11 1/2 in)
- Position: Forward

Senior career*
| Years | Team | Apps | (Gls) |
| –1987 | Rail de Thiès | | (12) |
| 1987–1989 | Diaraf | | |
| 1989–1993 | PSG | 6 | (0) |
| 1989–1990 | → Guingamp (loan) | 1 | (0) |
| 1991–1992 | → Châteauroux (loan) | 26 | (4) |
| 1995–1998 | Al Ahli SC (Doha) | 39 | (29) |
| 1998–2000 | Al Wahda FC | | (46) |
| 2001 | Al Sadd SC | 6 | (4) |

International career
| 1987–1992 | Senegal | 4 | (0) |
- * Club domestic league appearances and goals

Alboury Lah (born 23 April 1966) is a former Senegal international football forward.

== Career ==
Born in Thiès, Lah began playing football for local side Rail de Thiès. Next, he joined ASC Diaraf where he would win the 1989 national championship.

Lah joined Paris Saint-Germain F.C. in 1989, and would make six Ligue 1 appearances for the club. PSG loaned him to Ligue 2 sides En Avant de Guingamp and LB Châteauroux before he left the club in 1993.

Lah made several appearances for the Senegal national football team, and played at the 1992 African Cup of Nations finals.

== Club Career Stats ==
| Club | Season | QSL | | Qatar Sheikh Jassem Cup | | Qatar Emir Cup | | Total | |
| Club | Season | Apps | Goals | Apps | Goals | Apps | Goals | Apps | Goals |
|---|---|---|---|---|---|---|---|---|---|
| Al Ahli | 1995–96 | 11 | 8 | 0 | 0 | 2 | 0 | 13 | 8 |
| Al Ahli | 1996–97 | 13 | 11 | 4 | 7 | 4 | 1 | 17 | 19 |
| Al Ahli | 1997–98 | 15 | 10 | 4 | 4 | 5 | 5 | 24 | 19 |
| Career total | | 39 | 29 | 8 | 11 | 11 | 6 | 51 | 46 |
| Al Sadd | 2000–01 | 6 | 4 | 0 | 0 | 2 | 2 | 8 | 6 |
| Career total | | 6 | 4 | 0 | 0 | 2 | 2 | 8 | 6 |
