= Thomas Abel (footballer) =

Danish footballer (born 1974)

Personal information
- Full name: Thomas Abel
- Date of birth: 13 March 1974 (age 52)
- Place of birth: Denmark
- Position: Defender

Senior career*
| Years | Team | Apps | (Gls) |
| –1997 | Køge Boldklub | | |
| 1997–2001 | Herfølge Boldklub | 34 | (2) |
| 2001–2002 | B 93 | | |
| 2002–2003 | Herfølge Boldklub | | |
| 2003–2004 | Kedah FA | | |
| 2004–2005 | Greve Fodbold | | |
| 2007–2008 | Greve Fodbold | | |

Managerial career
- 2006–2007: Ejby IF
- 2008–2009: Ejby IF
- * Club domestic league appearances and goals

Thomas Abel (born 13 March 1974) is a Danish former professional association football player, who most prominently won the 2000 Danish Superliga championship with Herfølge Boldklub.

Abel started his career with Køge Boldklub, before moving to Herfølge Boldklub in the top-flight Danish Superliga in 1997. He played 34 games and scored two goals in the Superliga from November 1997 to June 2001, and helped Herfølge BK win the 1999–2000 Superliga championship. In January 2001, Abel was put on the transfer list.

He went on to play for lower-league club B 93, and had a brief spell back at Herfølge BK, now playing in the Danish 1st Division. Abel was brought to Malaysian club Kedah FA by fellow Dane Jørgen E. Larsen, who coached the team. He later returned to Denmark to play for lower-league club Greve Fodbold. In 2006, he retired to be youth coach of amateur club Ejby IF, but in 2007 he was convinced to return to the pitch and play for Greve Fodbold once again. He ended his career in June 2008.
