= 1984–85 Qatar Stars League =

21st season of top-tier football league in Qatar

Qatar Stars League
- Season: 1984–85

Statistics of Qatar Stars League for the 1984–85 season.

== Overview ==
It was contested by 7 teams, and Al-Arabi Sports Club won the championship.

== League standings ==
Pos	Team	Pld	W	D	L	GF	GA	GD	Pts
1	Al-Arabi Sports Club	12	7	5	0	17	4	+13	19
2	Qatar SC	12	4	6	2	16	14	+2	14
3	Al-Rayyan Sports Club	12	5	3	4	18	16	+2	13
4	Al-Ahli (Doha)	12	4	5	3	14	14	0	13
5	Al-Sadd Sports Club	12	3	5	4	15	15	0	11
6	Al-Taawon	12	1	6	5	7	9	−2	8
7	Al-Ittihad Doha	12	1	4	7	8	24	−16	6

Source: RSSSF
