= 1989–90 Qatar Stars League =

26th season of top-tier football league in Qatar

Qatar Stars League
- Season: 1989–90
- Champions: Al-Rayyan
- Asian Club Championship: Al-Rayyan
- Top goalscorer: (Brazil) Marquinho Carioca (10 goals)

Statistics of Qatar Stars League for the 1989–90 season.

== Overview ==
Al-Rayyan won the championship.

== Personnel ==
Team	Head coach
Al Ahli	
Al-Arabi	(Brazil) Luis Alberto
Al-Ittihad	(Brazil) Sérgio Cosme
Al-Rayyan	(England) Alan Dicks
Al Sadd	(Brazil) Cabralzinho
Al-Shamal	
Al-Taawon	
Al-Wakrah	(Brazil) Flamarion
Qatar SC	(West Germany) Uli Maslo

== Foreign players ==
Team	Player 1	Player 2	Former players
Al Ahli	(Egypt) Mohamed Omar El-Zeer		
Al-Arabi	(Brazil) Marquinho Carioca	(Iran) Abdolali Changiz	(Iran) Jafar Mokhtarifar
Al-Ittihad	(Iran) Morteza Kermani Moghaddam		
Al-Rayyan			
Al Sadd	(Brazil) Mendonça	(Iran) Ebrahim Ghasempour	
Al-Shamal			
Al-Taawon			
Al-Wakrah	(Brazil) Luisinho Lemos	(Iran) Bijan Taheri	
Qatar SC	(Iran) Abdolreza Barzegari	(Iran) Hamid Derakhshan	
