= Hassan Sabela =

Qatari footballer (Unknown birthdate)

Personal information
- Full name: Hassan Sabela Abdulrahman
- Date of birth: Unknown
- Place of birth: Doha, Qatar
- Position: Striker

Senior career*
| Years | Team | Apps | (Gls) |
| 1980s | Al Ahli | | |

International career
| 1985–1988 | Qatar | 3 | (0) |
- * Club domestic league appearances and goals

Hassan Sabela alternatively known as Hassan Sbila, (Arabic: حسن سبيلا), is a former Qatari football footballer who played for Al-Ahli and represented the Qatar national team in the 1980s.

== Club career ==
Sabela played for Al Ahli throughout the 1980s. In the 1986–87 season, he was the top goal-scorer in the Qatari League's with nine goals. And in the 1990–91 season, he tied with Adel Khamis and Mahmoud Soufi with ten goals.

He was crucial to Ahli's success in the Emir Cup throughout the 1980s, helping them win the tournament several times. Where he scored in both the 1980–81 and 1986–87 Emir Cup.

== International career ==
In 1985, Sabela featured with the Qatar national team, where he played against Bahrain in the semi-finals of the 1985 Arab Cup. He also played in the third-place playoff match against Saudi Arabia. The tournament ended with Qatar finishing in fourth place.

In 1988, Sabela played a friendly against Indonesia, which Qatar won by 0–1.

== Honours ==
=== Al-Ahli ===
- Emir Cup:
  - Winners (3): 1981, 1987, 1992
  - Runners-up (2): 1984, 1985

=== Individual ===
- Qatari League top goal-scorer (2): 1986–1987, 1990–1991 (shared)
