= 1982–83 Qatar Stars League =

19th season of top-tier football league in Qatar

Qatar Stars League
- Season: 1982–83

== Overview ==
Al-Arabi Sports Club won the championship.
