= 1981–82 Qatar Stars League =

18th season of top-tier football league in Qatar

Qatar Stars League
- Season: 1981–82

Statistics of Qatar Stars League for the 1981–82 season.

== Overview ==
Al-Rayyan Sports Club won the championship.
