= Flamarion (footballer, born 1951) =

Brazilian footballer (1951–2020)

Personal information
- Full name: Flamarion Nunes Tomazolli
- Date of birth: 27 August 1951
- Place of birth: Ouro Fino, Brazil
- Date of death: 27 January 2020 (aged 68)
- Place of death: Ouro Fino, Brazil
- Positions: Defender; midfielder

Youth career
- Sete de Setembro-MG

Senior career*
Years	Team	Apps	(Gls)
1966–1977	Guarani		
1977–1979	Cruzeiro	86	(3)
1979	Sport Recife		
1980–1984	Botafogo-SP		

Managerial career
- 1994: Al Sadd
- 1996: Ponte Preta
- 2002: Avaí
- 2005: Guarani
- * Club domestic league appearances and goals

Flamarion Nunes Tomazolli (27 August 1951 – 27 January 2020) was a Brazilian professional football player and manager.

== Career ==
Formed in the youth teams of Sete de Setembro in Belo Horizonte, he played for Guarani from 1966 to 1976, scoring the club's first goal in Brazilian championships, in addition to frequently being placed in the best XI in history. He also played for Cruzeiro, where he was state champion in 1977, Botafogo-SP.

In 1968, the player was at the center of an alleged scheme to benefit Palmeiras, who were at risk of being relegated in that year's edition of the Campeonato Paulista. The player entered the field in the match, held on 29 June 1968, causing Guarani to exceed the number of athletes with amateur contracts on the field, thus being later punished by the sports court, directly benefiting Palmeiras. Comercial de Ribeirão Preto, who ended up relegated instead of Palmeiras, managed to overturn the relegation by proving in court the agreement between the teams, returning to the first level directly in 1970.

== Death ==
Flamarion died in his hometown, in Santa Casa de Ouro Fino, due to complications from cancer.
