= 1985–86 Qatar Stars League =

22nd season of top-tier football league in Qatar

Qatar Stars League
- Season: 1985–86

Statistics of Qatar Stars League for the 1985–86 season.

== Overview ==
Al-Rayyan Sports Club won the championship.
