= Jørgen E. Larsen =

Danish footballer and coach (1945–2020)

Personal information
- Full name: Jørgen Erik Larsen
- Date of birth: 25 July 1945
- Place of birth: Herfølge, Denmark
- Date of death: 7 February 2020 (aged 74)
- Place of death: Herfølge, Denmark

Senior career*
Years	Team	Apps	(Gls)
	Herfølge Boldklub	197	

Managerial career
- 1987–1990: Herfølge Boldklub
- 1993–1994: Ghana
- 1994–1995: Al-Rayyan SC
- 1995: Qatar (youth)
- 1995–1996: Qatar
- 1997–1998: Pahang FA
- 1999–2000: Al-Rayyan SC
- 2001: Al-Shaab
- 2001–2003: Kedah FA
- 2004–2005: Al-Rayyan SC
- 2006: Brønshøj BK
- 2006–2007: Amager United
- 2007–2008: Tårnby BK
- * Club domestic league appearances and goals

Jørgen Erik Larsen (25 July 1945 – 7 February 2020) was a Danish football coach and player.

He spent most of his playing career at Herfølge Boldklub, playing 197 games for the club. In 1978, he was named sports director of Herfølge Boldklub and manager of the club in 1987. In 1993, he was named new coach of the Ghana national team, and later on he became the national team coach of Qatar. He was the manager of Qatari team Al-Rayyan SC, coaching Fernando Hierro, Mario Basler, and the brothers Frank and Ronald de Boer at the club. He was manager of Malaysian team Kedah FA, and attracted former Herfølge player Thomas Abel to the club in the summer of 2002. In November 2005, Larsen was signed as a manager of Brønshøj BK in the second-tier Danish 1st Division.

== Honours ==
- Qatari League: 1994–95
