= 1983–84 Qatar Stars League =

20th season of top-tier Qatari football

Qatar Stars League
- Season: 1983–84

Statistics of Qatar Stars League for the 1983–84 season.

== Overview ==
It was contested by 7 teams, and Al-Rayyan Sports Club won the championship.

== League standings ==
Pos	Team	Pld	W	D	L	GF	GA	GD	Pts
1	Al-Rayyan Sports Club	12	7	2	3	15	18	−3	16
2	Al-Ahli (Doha)	12	7	1	4	14	12	+2	15
3	Al-Arabi Sports Club	12	5	4	3	9	6	+3	14
4	Qatar SC	12	5	1	6	16	12	+4	11
5	Al-Sadd Sports Club	12	4	3	5	12	11	+1	11
6	Al-Taawon	12	4	2	6	17	19	−2	10
7	Al-Wakrah Sports Club	12	2	3	7	13	18	−5	7

Source: RSSSF
