= Jamal Al-Khatib =

Footballer (born 1952)

Personal information
- Full name: Jamal Sobhi Abdel-Hafiz Al-Khatib
- Date of birth: 12 December 1952 (age 73)
- Place of birth: Beirut, Lebanon
- Height: 1.76 m (5 ft 9 in)
- Position: Forward

Youth career
- 1962–1965: Ansar

Senior career*
Years	Team	Apps	(Gls)
1966–1969	Ansar		
1971	→ Khaitan (loan)		
1970–1991	Nejmeh		
1975	→ Al-Esteqlal (loan)		

International career
1967	Palestine		
1971	Lebanon	2	(0)
- * Club domestic league appearances and goals

Jamal Sobhi Abdel-Hafiz Al-Khatib (Arabic: جمال صبحي عبد الحافظ الخطيب, born 12 December 1952) is a footballer who played as a forward. Born in Lebanon, he played for the Palestine and Lebanon national teams.

Because of his speed and technical prowess, he was nicknamed "the Gazelle" and is most remembered for his tenure with Nejmeh in the 1970s and 1980s.

== Early life ==
Al-Khatib was born on 12 December 1952 in Beirut, Lebanon, to Palestinian parents: his father was from Lydda while his mother was from Jaffa. He grew up in a football-loving family and began playing from a young age. When he was twelve years old, he played for the Al-Sha'la club in the Tariq Al-Jadida area of Beirut, which included Ard Jaloul and the nearby hills. Mustafa Afif Al-Baba, the secretary of Ansar, found him and invited him to join.

He joined the youth academy of Ansar under coach Al-Baba before progressing to the senior team in 1966.

== Club career ==
Al-Khatib was promoted to Ansar's senior squad in 1966; the same year, he became the team's top scorer alongside Mahmoud Sidani. He played for the club until 1969, when he joined Nejmeh and played under coach Samir Al-Adou. He quickly became one of the team's most popular and effective forwards, known for his pace and finishing ability. During this time, he also trained with Kuwaiti club Khaitan, and received numerous offers from abroad such as Al-Nasr, Al Hilal, Galatasaray, Panathinaikos, and others. Reports also suggested he received an offer to join Al Ahly of Egypt.

During his time with Nejmeh, he was among the top scorers in the Lebanese League, with a notable season in 1974–75 where he scored around 13 goals. He contributed to Nejmeh's success, where the team went on to win the league title, finishing the campaign with an invincible season by winning 18 games, drawing 4, and losing none.

In 1975, when Pelé visited Lebanon to play a friendly match against Nejmeh, he praised Al-Khatib's skill and stated that he could easily play abroad with his level of talent.

In 1973, renowned Turkish team Fenerbahçe made Al-Khatib an offer through Lebanese international referee Sarkis Demirdjian. After flying to Istanbul, the Lebanese player participated in his first training session and performed admirably, impressing the technical staff and scoring six goals. Demirdjian was immediately asked by the club's administration to finish the transfer at any costs. When Demirdjian discovered, to his astonishment, that his business in Beirut had been vandalised by irate Nejmeh supporters the following day, he called the Turkish club's management and told them, "Forget Jamal."

In 1975, Al-Khatib was informed by the late Palestinian president Yasser Arafat that the Qatar Football Association wanted to Include him for their national team. He then traveled to Doha, where he was received by the Crown Prince Sheikh Hamad bin Khalifa Al Thani who asked him to join Al-Esteglal. Al-Khatib went on to score eight goals in the Qatari League. He also scored a brace in the final of the 1975–76 Emir Cup. However, he could not continue with the club due to Nejmeh asking for $100,000, then doubling the amount.

Al-Khatib is also credited with the first-ever goal scored in the Arab Club Champions Cup against Al-Ahli in the 1981–82 Arab Club Champions Cup. He also scored in the final of the competition, but Nejmeh went on to be runners-up behind Al-Shorta.

== International career ==
Al-Khatib played for the Lebanon national team for most of his international career during the 1970s.

In 1967, Al-Khatib joined a group of diaspora players that included Fouad Abu Ghaida, Marwan Kanafani, Faisal Al-Bibi, Omar Taha, and others when he was called up to represent the Palestine national team. Al-Khatib scored a goal against Tunisia in the Palestinian national team's subsequent trip to the Maghreb nations.

In 1976, Al-Khatib was selected for the Qatar national team's roster for the 1976 Gulf Cup, which Qatar hosted. Since Al-Khatib had played for the Palestinian and Lebanese national teams in the past, the Kuwaiti delegate protested to his name during a meeting of the chiefs of the participating countries. After the Crown Prince objected, the Qatari team nearly pulled out of the tournament since it was depending entirely on Jamal. In the end, Al-Khatib could not play for the national team, and Qatar went on to participate in the tournament.

== Style of play ==
Nicknamed "the Gazelle”, Al-Khatib was known for his exceptional pace, dribbling, and ability to score under intense pressure. Fans praised him for his loyalty and sportsmanship both on and off the field.

== Personal life ==
The eighth member of the family, Al-Khatib was the youngest child after his siblings Jamila, Abdul Hafeez, Farouk, Omar, Hiam, Jamil, and Sabah. Following his youngest son, Jamal, his father Subhi Al Khatib had four daughters: Hanaa, Amal, Basma, and Sanaa.

== Legacy ==
Al-Khatib is considered to be among the most gifted forwards in Lebanese and Palestinian football history, and is considered one of the best Arab footballers. He is also remembered for his longevity and skills.
