= Allan Jones (football coach) =

English football coach

Personal information
- Place of birth: England

Managerial career
- Years: Team
- Bristol City
- Blyth Spartans
- 1972: Darlington
- Bermuda
- 1983–1984: New Zealand
- 1986–1987: Al-Jahra SC
- 1987–1989: Kuwait SC
- 1995–1998: Al-Shamal
- 1998: Al Rayyan SC
- 2004–2006: Auckland City FC
- 2007: New Zealand Women

Allan Jones is an English association football coach who managed the New Zealand national team.

Jones coached at Bristol City, Blyth Spartans and Darlington in England, and also managed Bermuda before moving to New Zealand in 1979. Jones first took charge of the New Zealand side in October 1983. New Zealand won 15, drew 9 and lost 16 of his 40 games in charge.

== Managerial statistics ==
Team	From	To	Record				
Team	From	To	G	W	L	D	Win %
Darlington	April 1972	December 1972	28	6	13	9	21.4
New Zealand	October 1983	1984	40	15	9	16	37.5
