= Džemal Hadžiabdić =

Bosnian football manager and player

Personal information
- Full name: Džemaludin Hadžiabdić
- Date of birth: 25 July 1953 (age 73)
- Place of birth: Mostar, PR Bosnia-Herzegovina, FPR Yugoslavia
- Height: 1.74 m (5 ft 9 in)
- Position: Defender

Youth career
- 1960–1971: Velež Mostar

Senior career*
Years	Team	Apps	(Gls)
1971–1980	Velež Mostar	217	(3)
1980–1983	Swansea City	105	(1)
Total		322	(4)

International career
1974–1978	Yugoslavia	20	(0)

Managerial career
- 1992–1999: Al-Gharafa
- 1997–1998: Qatar
- 1999–2001: Qatar
- 2002: Al Ain
- 2003–2004: Al-Wakrah
- 2004–2005: Al Shabab
- 2006: Qatar SC
- 2009–2010: Al-Sailiya
- 2010–2011: Fujairah
- 2012: Fujairah
- 2012: Al Dhafra
- 2013: East Riffa
- 2013–2014: Fujairah
- 2016–2017: Fujairah
- * Club domestic league appearances and goals

Džemaludin "Džemal" Hadžiabdić (born 25 July 1953), also known as Jamal Haji, is a Bosnian professional football manager and former footballer who played as a defender.

== Playing career ==
He made his debut for Yugoslavia in a September 1974 friendly against Italy and went on to earn 20 caps for the national team, scoring no goals. His final international was an October 1978 European Championship qualification match against Romania.

== Managerial career ==
In August 2015, he was expected to be appointed as head coach of the Iraq national football team, having arrived in the country and expected to attend the unveiling press conference; he departed Iraq a day later.

== Managerial Statistics ==
As of 6 December 2012

Managerial record by team and tenure
Team	From	To	Record				
Team	From	To	P	W	D	L	Win %
Qatar	1 January 1997	31 December 1997	8	3	1	4	37.5
Qatar	1 January 2000	31 December 2000	19	7	6	6	36.8
Al Dhafra	2012	6 December 2012	11	2	5	4	18.2
Total			38	12	12	14	31.58

== Honours and achievements ==
=== Manager ===
Al-Gharafa

- Qatar Stars League: 1991–92, 1997–98
- Emir of Qatar Cup: 1994–95, 1995–96, 1996–97, 1997–98

Al Ain

- UAE Pro-League: 2001–02

Al-Wakrah

- Qatari Sheikh Jassim Cup: 2004

Al Dhafra

- UAE Federation Cup: 2011–12
