= Samir Kadhim Hassan =

Iraqi footballer and manager

Personal information
- Date of birth: 11 December 1969 (age 56)
- Place of birth: Iraq
- Position: Defender

Senior career*
Years	Team	Apps	(Gls)
- Al-Jaish SC
- Al-Quwa Al-Jawiya
- Al Sadd SC
- Al Wakra
- Qatar SC
- Shabab Al Sahel F.C
- Al-Baqa'a Club
- Al-Quwa Al-Jawiya

International career
1989–1998	Iraq	35	(1)

Managerial career
- 2004: Al-Quwa Al-Jawiya
- 2006: Al-Quwa Al-Jawiya
- 2008: Al-Quwa Al-Jawiya
- 2018–2019: Al-Diwaniya FC
- 2019–2020: Al-Samawa FC
- 2021: Al-Diwaniya FC
- 2021: Al-Samawa FC
- * Club domestic league appearances and goals

Samir Kadhim Hassan (Arabic: سَمِير كَاظِم حَسَن; born 11 December 1969) is an Iraqi football defender who played for Iraq in the 1996 Asian Cup. He also played for several clubs in the Qatar Stars League and Iraq Stars League.

Samir was a dominating and aggressive man-marker and a regular for the Iraqi national team during the 1990s. He was a member of Iraq's Asian Youth Championship winning team in 1988 in Doha, Qatar which included goalkeeper Emad Hashim, captain Radhi Shenaishil and attacking midfielder Laith Hussein.

A year later, Samir participated in the World Youth Cup, helping Iraq top a group featuring Argentina, Norway and Spain, but in the 2nd round the Iraqi team lost 2–1 to USA.

Samir was part of the 1998 World Cup campaign that ended when Iraq lost home and away to Kazakhstan. Samir retired from the national team in 1999, 10 years after making his debut.

== Coaching career ==
Daham has managed many teams, Al-Diwaniya FC (Iraq), and is coaching Al-Samawa FC (Iraq) now.

=== Al Samawa FC ===
On June 24, 2019, Kadhim was appointed as Al-Samawa FC manager, he had six games left to make the team stay in the Iraqi Premier League. Kadhim had to get a win at least to make the dream come true. That's what happened when Al-Samawa FC won Kadhim's third game 2–1 against Amanat Baghdad which was the main success for Kadhim, he ended the season with one win, three draws and a two loses. On July 30, Samir Kadhim renewed his contract with the Al-Samawa FC after talks with Al-Quwa Al-Jawiya because of some administrative problems.

== Managerial statistics ==
As of match played 27 June 2021

Managerial record by team and tenure
Team	From	To	Record					Ref.
Team	From	To	P	W	D	L	Win %	Ref.
Al-Diwaniya	17 June 2018	23 August 2018	6	1	3	2	16.7	
Al-Samawa	24 June 2019	17 July 2020	17	4	7	6	23.5	
Al-Diwaniya	6 January 2021	23 February 2021	9	1	4	4	11.1	
Al-Samawa	10 March 2021	27 June 2021	14	2	6	6	14.3	
Total			46	8	20	18	17.4	—
