= Adnan Dirjal =

Iraqi footballer & coach (born 1960)

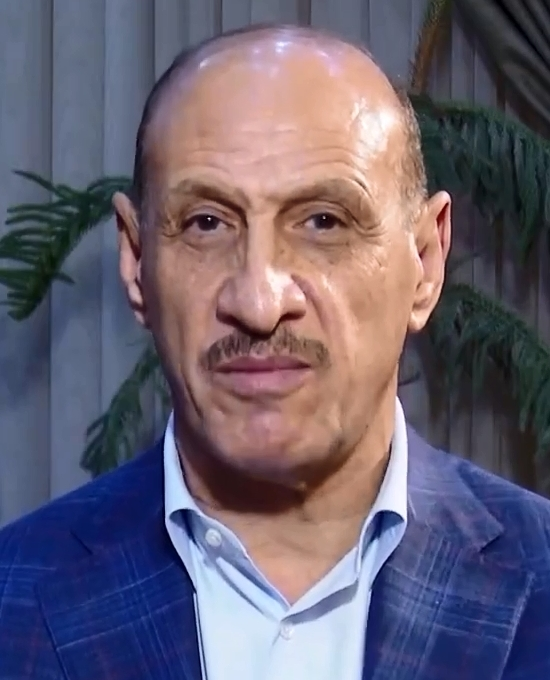

President of Iraq Football Association
- In office 14 September 2021 – 23 May 2026
- Preceded by: Eyad Al Nadawi
- Succeeded by: Younis Mahmoud

Minister of Youth and Sports
- In office 7 May 2020 – 27 October 2022
- Prime Minister: Mustafa Al-Kadhimi
- Preceded by: Ahmed Obeidi
- Succeeded by: Ahmed Al-Mubarqa

Minister of Culture
- Acting; 7 May 2020 – 9 June 2020
- Prime Minister: Mustafa Al-Kadhimi
- Preceded by: Abdulameer al-Hamdani
- Succeeded by: Hassan Nazim

Personal details
- Born: Adnan Dirjal Mutar Jasim; 26 January 1960 (age 66) Baghdad, Iraq
- Party: Independent
- Children: 4, including Muhannad
- Occupation: Footballer; coach; football administrator; government official
Association football career
- Height: 1.90 m (6 ft 3 in)
- Position: Defender
Youth career
- 1976–1977: Assyrian Sports Club
Senior career*
| Years | Team | Apps | (Gls) |
| 1977–1980 | Al-Zawraa | | |
| 1980–1984 | Al-Talaba | | |
| 1984–1990 | Al-Rasheed | | |
International career
| 1978–1990 | Iraq | 122 | (8) |
Managerial career
- 1991–1992: Al-Karkh
- 1992–1993: Iraq
- 1993–1994: Al-Quwa Al-Jawiya
- 1995–1998: Al Wakrah
- 1999: Al Sadd
- 1999: Al Shamal
- 1999–2000: Al Wakrah
- 2000–2001: Al Arabi
- 2004: Al Sailiya
- 2004–2005: Al Wakrah
- 2007: Al Wakrah
- 2010–2012: Al Wakrah
- 2013–2014: Al Wakrah
- * Club domestic league appearances and goals

Adnan Dirjal (Arabic: عدنان درجال مطر; born 26 January 1960 in Baghdad) is an Iraqi former professional footballer, as well as a former national team coach, and former Minister of Youth and Sports. He was one of Iraq's most prominent national team captains, who played as a defender.

== Club career ==
Dirjal started his career with Al-Zawraa, where he won the Iraqi league and cup double in 1978/1979. He went on to join Al-Talaba, where he was one of the stars of a team that included Haris Mohammed, Jamal Ali and the great Hussein Saeed. At Al-Talaba Adnan won the Iraqi league two times and reached two cup finals.

His most successful club spell came at Al-Rasheed, the club owned by Saddam Hussein's eldest son Uday, where he captained the club and won three Iraqi league titles, two cups and a record three Arab Club Championships during the mid to late 1980s.

== International career ==
Dirjal made the step into international football early, helping Iraq win both the CISM World Military Championship and the Gulf Cup in 1979. He later played at three Olympic Games, in 1980, 1984 and 1988, three Gulf Cup victories, and the Asian Games win over Kuwait in 1982. The biggest disappointment in a glittering career was missing the World Cup finals in Mexico in 1986 through injury.

== Political career ==
Dirjal secured a position in Iraqi PM Mustafa Al-Kadhimi's cabinet in May 2020 when he was appointed Minister of Youth and Sports.

== Administrative career ==
On 14 September 2021, Dirjal became the president of Iraq Football Association. He was later succeeded by his deputy Younis Mahmoud on 23 May 2026.

== Career statistics ==
=== International goals ===
Scores and results list Iraq's goal tally first.

| No | Date | Venue | Opponent | Score | Result | Competition |
|---|---|---|---|---|---|---|
| 1. | 25 March 1981 | Prince Mohamed bin Fahd Stadium, Riyadh | Bahrain | 2–0 | 2–0 | 1982 FIFA World Cup qualification |
| 2. | 28 March 1984 | Royal Oman Police Stadium, Muscat | Qatar | 1–0 | 1–1 | 7th Arabian Gulf Cup |
| 3. | 27 September 1986 | Daegu Stadium, Daegu | Thailand | 1–0 | 2–1 | 1986 Asian Games |

== Personal life ==
Dirjal has three sons and one daughter. One of them is Muhannad Darjal, who played professionally for Al Wakrah as a defender.

== See also ==
- List of men's footballers with 100 or more international caps

Sporting positions
| Preceded by Hussein Saeed | Iraq captain 1990 | Succeeded by Ahmed Radhi |
