= Cláudio Prates =

Brazilian footballer (born 1965)

Personal information
- Full name: Cláudio Mendes Prates
- Date of birth: 18 September 1965 (age 61)
- Place of birth: Rosário do Sul, Brazil
- Position: Forward

Team information
- Current team: Bahia (assistant)

Youth career
- 1983–1984: Inter-SM

Senior career*
Years	Team	Apps	(Gls)
1984–1985	Inter-SM		
1986–1989	Vasco da Gama	17	(5)
1987	→ América-SP (loan)		
1987	→ Farense (loan)	2	(1)
1988	→ Bragantino (loan)		
1989	→ Juventus-SP (loan)		
1990–1992	Vitória		
1993	Caxias		
1994	Figueirense		
1994–1995	Košice		
1995–1996	ABC		
1996–1997	Al Arabi		
1997–1998	Al Shamal		
1998–2001	Al Arabi		
2001–2002	Al-Shoulla		
2002–2004	Al Khaleej		

Managerial career
- 2006–2007: Vitória (youth)
- 2007: Brasiliense (assistant)
- 2008: Brasiliense (interim)
- 2008: Paysandu (assistant)
- 2008–2009: Vila Nova (assistant)
- 2009: Mogi Mirim (assistant)
- 2009: América Mineiro (assistant)
- 2010: Sport (assistant)
- 2010: Santa Cruz (assistant)
- 2010: Ponte Preta (assistant)
- 2011: Remo (assistant)
- 2011: Joinville (assistant)
- 2011–2016: América Mineiro (assistant)
- 2012: América Mineiro (interim)
- 2014: América Mineiro (interim)
- 2016: América Mineiro (interim)
- 2016–2017: Al-Shabab (assistant)
- 2017–2018: Palmeiras (assistant)
- 2018–: Bahia (assistant)
- 2018: Bahia (interim)
- 2020: Bahia (interim)
- * Club domestic league appearances and goals

Cláudio Mendes Prates (born 18 September 1965), known as Cláudio Prates or just Claudinho, is a Brazilian retired footballer who played as a forward, and is the current assistant manager of Bahia.

== Playing career ==
Known as Claudinho during his playing days, he was an Internacional de Santa Maria youth graduate. In 1986 he joined Vasco da Gama, and went on to feature sparingly for the club during his three-year spell, split by loans to América-SP, Bragantino, Juventus-SP and Primeira Liga side S.C. Farense.

Claudinho subsequently represented Vitória, Caxias, Figueirense, Košice and ABC before moving to Arabic football. He retired in 2004, with Al Khaleej.

== Managerial career ==
Shortly after retiring, Prates began his career with former club Vitória, being an assistant of the youth setup. In 2006 he was promoted to the first team, remaining as an assistant until the arrival of Givanildo Oliveira as manager.

Prates subsequently followed Givanildo at Brasiliense, Paysandu, Vila Nova, Mogi Mirim, América Mineiro, Sport, Santa Cruz, Ponte Preta and Remo before parting ways in 2011 to become Joinville's assistant. Late in that year he returned to América, being an assistant but also interim manager on some occasions.

On 19 October 2016 Prates left Coelho, and was named Palmeiras' assistant the following 10 January. In April 2018, he joined Bahia; initially an assistant, he was appointed interim manager after the dismissal of Guto Ferreira.

== Honours ==
=== Player ===
Vasco da Gama

- Taça Guanabara: 1986

Bragantino

- Campeonato Paulista Série A2: 1988

Vitória

- Campeonato Baiano: 1990, 1992
- Campeonato Brasileiro Série B runner up: 1992

ABC

- Campeonato Potiguar: 1997

Al Arabi

- Kuwait Emir Cup: 1999, 2000
- Kuwait Crown Prince Cup: 1999, 2000
- Al Kurafi Cup: 1999
