= Abdul Sule =

Nigerian footballer (born 1975)

Personal information
- Date of birth: January 20, 1975 (age 51)
- Place of birth: Kaduna, Nigeria
- Height: 1.90 m (6 ft 3 in)
- Position: Forward

Senior career*
Years	Team	Apps	(Gls)
1993–1994	NUB Kaduna		
1994	Stationery Stores F.C.		
1994–1995	BCC Lions		
1996–1997	Qatar SC		
1997–2000	Herning Fremad	43	(25)
2000–2004	Akademisk Boldklub	137	(30)
2004–2005	Køge BK	32	(8)
2005–2006	AC Horsens	22	(0)
2006–2007	Lolland-Falster Alliancen	9	(1)
2007–2008	Johor FC		
2008–2009	Plateau United		

International career
1992–1993	Nigeria	6	(0)
- * Club domestic league appearances and goals as of December 31, 2006

Abdul Kareem Sule (born January 20, 1975, in Kaduna) is a former Nigerian football player and player agent.

== Career ==
Sule began his career in 1993 with his hometown club NUB Kaduna (Nigeria Universal Bank) before joining Stationery Stores F.C. in Lagos in 1994. He transferred to BCC Lions in July 1995. After six months, he left BCC Lions and moved to Qatar SC. With the Doha club, he was one of the top scorers and was scouted by Danish side Herning Fremad in 1997. He played three years for Herning Fremad before moving in 2000 to Akademisk Boldklub for a then Danish record transfer fee of nine million DKK, where he played for five seasons. In 2004, he signed with Køge BK, leaving the club after one year to join AC Horsens. The next year he transferred to Lolland-Falster Alliancen, and in 2007, he played in the Malaysia Super League for Johor FC.

== International career ==
Sule made 10 appearances and scored 2 goals for the Super Eagles in Africa Cup and World Cup qualifying matches between 1990 and 1993.

== Post-retirement ==
In 2008, Sule joined European Sports Management (ESM) as an associate football scout.
