= Qatar Stars League =

Qatari association football league

- Founded: 1963; 63 years ago
- Country: Qatar
- Confederation: Asian Football Confederation
- Number of clubs: 12
- Level on pyramid: 1
- Relegation to: Qatar Stars League 2
- Domestic cups: Emir Cup; Qatar Cup; Qatar FA Cup; Qatari Stars Cup; Sheikh Jassem Cup
- International cups: AFC Champions League Elite; AFC Champions League Two; Arab Club Champions Cup
- Current champions: Al-Sadd (19th title) (2025–26)
- Most championships: Al-Sadd (19 titles)
- Broadcaster: Alkass Sports
- Sponsors: Doha Bank; Alkass; Toyota
- Website: qsl.qa
- Current: 2025–26 Qatar Stars League

The Qatar Stars League (Arabic: دوري نجوم قطر, romanized: Dawrī Nujūm Qaṭar; abbreviated as QSL), known as Doha Bank Stars League for sponsorship reasons, is the top level football league in Qatar. Contested by 12 teams, it operates on a system of promotion and relegation with the Qatari Second Division (QSD), with the lowest ranked club at the end of the QSL season being demoted to make room for the promotion of the highest ranked QSD club of the season. The QSL season usually runs from September to April. The league's first season was played in 1963, although the first official season occurred in 1972.

The Qatari league system provides 5 domestic cups that various clubs can compete for: the Emir of Qatar Cup, open to all teams in both the first and second divisions; the Qatar Cup, a postseason tournament played by the top four first division teams; the Sheikh Jassem Cup, a prelude to the first division regular season; the Qatari Stars Cup, a round-robin tournament played midseason; and the Qatar FA Cup, where the bottom 8 teams from the QSL and the entire QSD participate. The league title has been officially won by 7 clubs since its inception. The club that has won the most championships is Al-Sadd, with 19 titles.

== League structure ==
There are two divisions in the Qatari football structure and the league has previously seen one club promoted and relegated each year, except in expansion seasons. The Qatar Stars League, previously known as the Q-League currently features 12 teams, with the second division featuring eight teams. The top four clubs at the end of the regular league system participate in the Qatar Crown Prince Cup, which was formed in the 1994/95 season.

The Qatar Stars League has slowly expanded since the turn of the decade, moving from nine clubs to ten clubs, and then latest setup of 12 clubs for the Qatari League 2009-10 campaign. It was announced that in the 2013-14 season, the number of clubs in the top division would increase to 14, whereas the second division would increase to 18 clubs which includes the reserve teams of the top division clubs.

It was announced on 15 April 2009 that no clubs would be relegated from the top flight the 2008–09 Qatar Stars League season, due to expansion reasons, however the announcement was made with only one game remaining. That year, the top league expanded to 12 clubs. In May 2013, the QFA again expanded the league by two more teams, bringing the total number of clubs in the first division to 14. In 2017 the number of teams moved back to 12.

There are currently four official amateur football leagues in Qatar. Three amateur leagues are under the jurisdiction of the Qatar Community Football League (QCFL), established by the Supreme Committee for Delivery & Legacy, and the fourth, known as the Qatar Amateur League (QAL) is recognized by the QFA. Inaugurated in November 2013, the QAL has 14 teams, all of which were established through the country's government, political and social sectors.

== History ==
=== Early history ===
The first unofficial season of the Qatar Stars League was the 1963–64 season, three years after the formation of the QFA. Similarly, a second division was also created during this time. For many years, there was no promotion or relegation system. Al-Maref, a club representing the Ministry of Education, was dissolved in 1966-67 by decision of the QFA and its players distributed to other clubs.

=== First official season ===
In 1972–73, the first official season was played. Al Esteqlal, now known as Qatar SC, won the first championship.

The first time there was a playoff for the championship was in 1980, between Al Sadd and Al Arabi. Al Sadd won the match 1–0.

Although a second division had been in place for some time, there was no relegation or promotion system. However, in 1981, such a system was put in place for the first time. Five clubs participated in the second division that year.

In 1984–85, there was no relegation or promotion due to a lack of players, as members of the Qatar national football team were preparing for the qualification rounds of the 1986 FIFA World Cup.

In 1994, for one season, the QFA launched a new system where matches ending in draws would end in a penalty shoot-out to determine the winner. This was put in place in an effort to improve attendance.

Three second division clubs were dissolved in the 1990 season: Al Nasr, Al Tadamon, and Al Nahda. Many of their players were distributed to first division clubs and became prominent players in Qatari football history, such as Fahad Al Kuwari, Ahmed Al Kuwari and Hamad Al Khalifa. After the dissolution of these clubs, there was no longer any relegation or promotion for five years. In 1995/96, the second division was brought back with five clubs, while there were ten clubs participating in the first division.

=== The 2003 money influx from QFA ===
A successful method the QFA used to develop the league was allocating each Q-League club with a sum of $10,000,000 to buy big-name foreign players in order to increase popularity, in the summer of 2003. The attempt brought in players such as Ronald and Frank de Boer, Romário, Pep Guardiola, Fernando Hierro, Marcel Desailly, Stefan Effenberg, Claudio Caniggia and Gabriel Batistuta, who soon appeared and shone in the league.

In addition, in 2004, the Aspire Academy was formed, which provides training facilities to young people in order to improve the footballing standard not only in Qatar, but internationally. Many notable players have graduated from the academy, including Abdelkarim Hassan, Saad Al Sheeb, and Ibrahim Majid.

=== 2009: Changing name to Qatar Stars League ===
In 2009, no clubs were relegated from the top division. Due to the recent formation of Lekhwiya and El Jaish, this meant that the second division would lose two clubs while two more clubs would enter the first division, bringing the total number of clubs in the first division to 12, and the second division to six. As part of the expansion campaign, the Q-League changed its name to what it is currently known as the Qatar Stars League, and inaugurated a new domestic cup, the Qatari Stars Cup.

== Clubs ==
=== Champions ===
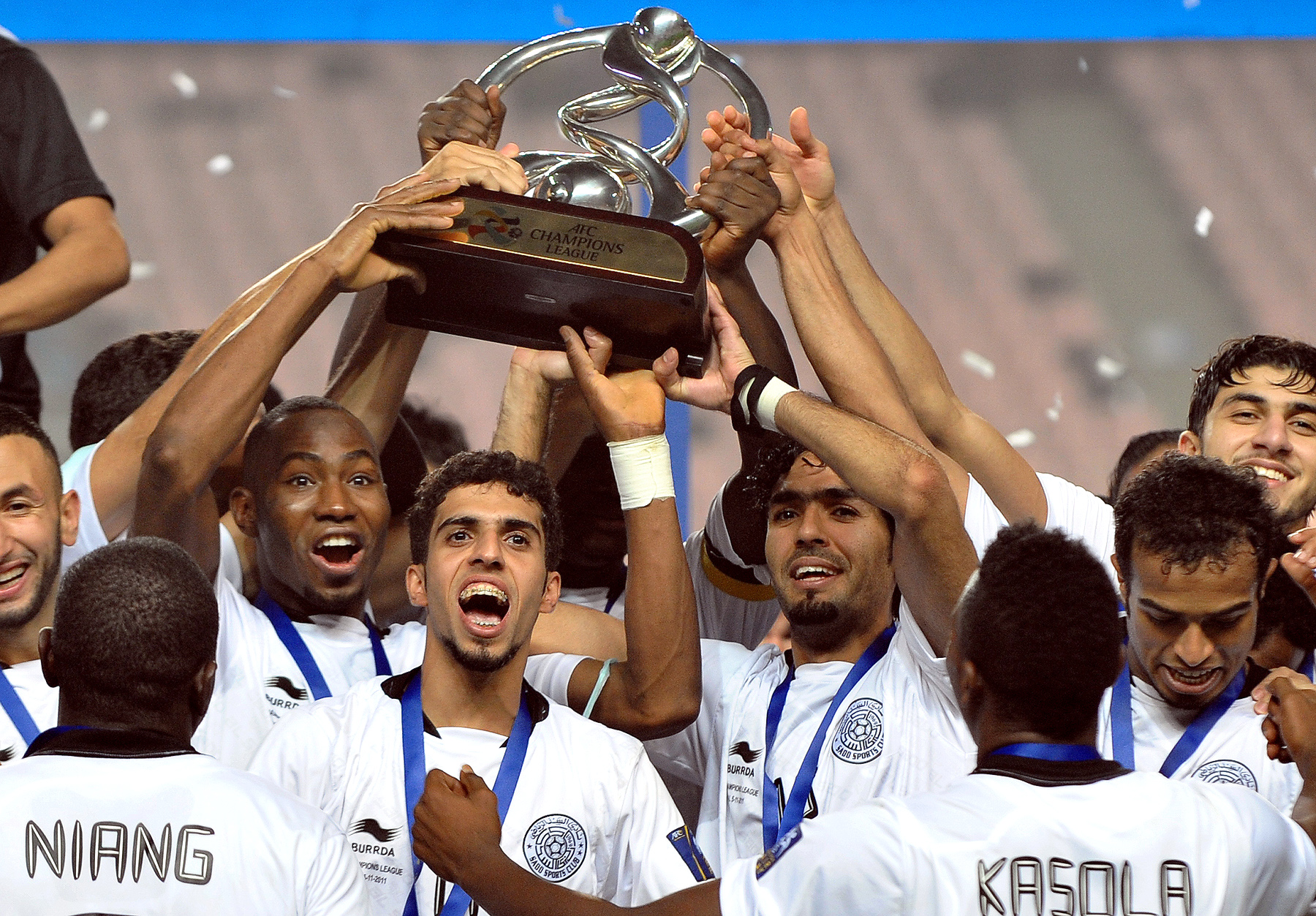
Al Sadd are the most successful team in the league

Club	Wins	Winning years
Al Sadd	19	1971–72, 1973–74, 1978–79, 1979–80, 1980–81, 1986–87, 1987–88, 1988–89, 1999–2000, 2003–04, 2005–06, 2006–07, 2012–13, 2018–19, 2020–21, 2021–22, 2023–24, 2024–25, 2025–26
Al Duhail	8	2010–11, 2011–12, 2013–14, 2014–15, 2016–17, 2017–18, 2019–20, 2022–23
Al-Rayyan	8	1975–76, 1977–78, 1981–82, 1983–84, 1985–86, 1989–90, 1994–95, 2015–16
Qatar SC	8	1966–67, 1967–68, 1968–69, 1969–70, 1970–71, 1972–73, 1976–77, 2002–03
Al-Arabi	7	1982–83, 1984–85, 1990–91, 1992–93, 1993–94, 1995–96, 1996–97
Al-Gharafa	7	1991–92, 1997–98, 2001–02, 2004–05, 2007–08, 2008–09, 2009–10
Al-Maaref	3	1963–64, 1964–65, 1965–66
Al-Wakrah	2	1998–99, 2000–01

=== Total titles won by region ===
Region	Number of titles	Clubs
Doha	44	Al-Sadd SC (19), Qatar SC (8), Al-Duhail (8), Al-Arabi (7), Al-Maaref (3)
Al Rayyan	15	Al-Rayyan (8), Al-Gharafa (7)
Al Wakrah	2	Al-Wakrah (2)

== Media coverage ==
=== Qatar ===
In 2012, Alkass Sports Channels signed a deal for the rights to broadcast the Stars League in English. beIN Sports also bought rights to broadcast the Stars League.

Seasons	Channel
2012–present	Alkass Sports
2012–2026	beIN Sports

=== International ===
Seasons	Countries	Channel
2023–present	South Korea	SPOTV
2023–present	ASEAN	SPOTV

== Post-season awards ==
An award system was developed in 2006 in which the best player and coach of the footballing season are selected by a panel of journalists. Each award winner receives $100,000. There are also awards for youth players and club staff.

Year	Best Player	Club	Best Player U23	Club	Best Coach	Club
2006	(Qatar) Sebastián Soria	Al Gharafa	Not held		(Uruguay) Jorge Fossati	Al Sadd
2007	(Qatar) Emerson Sheik	Al Sadd	Not held		(Uruguay) Jorge Fossati	Al Sadd
2008	(Morocco) Aziz Ben Askar	Umm Salal	(Qatar) Hassan Al Haydos	Al Sadd	(Brazil) Marcos Paquetá	Al Gharafa
2009	(Argentina) Leonardo Pisculichi	Al Arabi	Not held		(Brazil) Sebastião Lazaroni	Qatar SC
2010	(Brazil) Juninho Pernambucano	Al Gharafa	Not held		(Brazil) Caio Júnior	Al Gharafa
2011	(Ivory Coast) Bakari Koné	Lekhwiya	Not held		(Qatar) Abdullah Mubarak	Al Ahli
2012	(Brazil) Rodrigo Tabata	Al-Rayyan	Not held		(Uruguay) Diego Aguirre	Al-Rayyan
2013	(Qatar) Khalfan Ibrahim	Al Sadd	Not held		(Morocco) Hussein Amotta	Al Sadd
2014	(Algeria) Nadir Belhadj	Al Sadd	Not held		(Tunisia) Sami Trabelsi	Al-Sailiya
2015	(Qatar) Hassan Al-Haydos	Al Sadd	(Qatar) Abdurahman Al-Harazi	Al-Sailiya	(Denmark) Michael Laudrup	Lekhwiya
2016	(Qatar) Rodrigo Tabata	Al-Rayyan	(Qatar) Abdelkarim Hassan	Al Sadd	(Uruguay) Jorge Fossati	Al-Rayyan
2017	(South Korea) Nam Tae-hee	Lekhwiya	(Qatar) Almoez Ali	Lekhwiya	(Portugal) Jesualdo Ferreira	Al Sadd
2018	(Tunisia) Youssef Msakni	Al-Duhail	(Qatar) Almoez Ali	Lekhwiya	(Algeria) Djamel Belmadi	Al-Duhail
2019	(Qatar) Akram Afif	Al Sadd	(Qatar) Bassam Al-Rawi	Al-Duhail	(Portugal) Jesualdo Ferreira	Al Sadd
2020	(Qatar) Akram Afif	Al Sadd	(Qatar) Tarek Salman	Al Sadd	(Uruguay) Diego Aguirre	Al-Rayyan
2021	(Spain) Santi Cazorla	Al Sadd	(Qatar) Homam Ahmed	Lekhwiya	(Spain) Xavi	Al-Sadd
2022	(Qatar) Akram Afif	Al Sadd	(Qatar) Homam Ahmed	Al Gharafa	(Spain) Tintín Márquez	Al-Wakrah
2023	(Tunisia) Youssef Msakni	Al Arabi	(Qatar) Osama Al Tairy	Al-Rayyan	(Qatar) Younes Ali	Al Arabi
2024	(Qatar) Akram Afif	Al Sadd	(Qatar) Jassem Gaber	Al Arabi	(Portugal) Pedro Martins	Al-Gharafa

== Top goalscorers ==
Year		Best scorers	Team	Goals
1972–73	(Qatar)	Awad Hassan	Al-Esteqlal	10
1973–74	(Qatar)	Mansour Muftah	Al-Rayyan	15
1974–75	Not held			
1975–76	(Qatar)	Jamal Al-Khatib	Al-Esteqlal	8
1976–77	(Qatar)	Mansour Muftah	Al-Rayyan	13
1977–78	(Qatar)	Mansour Muftah	Al-Rayyan	11
1978–79	(Qatar)	Hassan Mattar	Al Sadd	11
1979–80	(Egypt) (Qatar) (Qatar) (Qatar)	Sharif Abdul-Hamed; Badr Bilal; Hamdan Hamed; Mansour Muftah	Qatar SC; Al Sadd; Al Ahli; Al-Rayyan	5
1980–81	(Qatar)	Hassan Mattar	Al Sadd	9
1981–82	(Qatar)	Mansour Muftah	Al-Rayyan	19
1982–83	(Qatar)	Mansour Muftah	Al-Rayyan	10
1983–84	(Qatar)	Mansour Muftah	Al-Rayyan	7
1984–85	(Qatar)	Ahmed Yaqoub	Al-Arabi	7
1985–86	(Qatar)	Mansour Muftah	Al-Rayyan	22
1986–87	(Qatar)	Hassan Sabela	Al Ahli	9
1987–88	(Qatar)	Hassan Jawhar	Al Sadd	11
1988–89	(Iran)	Farshad Pious	Al Ahli	9
1989–90	(Brazil)	Marquinho Carioca	Al-Arabi	10
1990–91	(Qatar) (Qatar) (Qatar)	Adel Khamis; Hassan Sabela; Mahmoud Soufi	Al-Ittihad; Al Ahli; Al-Ittihad	10
1991–92	(Algeria) (Qatar)	Rabah Madjer; Mubarak Mustafa	Qatar SC; Al-Arabi	8
1992–93	(Qatar)	Mubarak Mustafa	Al-Arabi	9
1993–94	(Iraq)	Ahmed Radhi	Al-Wakra	12
1994–95	(Qatar)	Mohammed Salem Al-Enazi	Al-Rayyan	9
1995–96	(Nigeria)	Ricky Owubokiri	Al-Arabi	16
1996–97	(Qatar) (Senegal)	Mubarak Mustafa; Alboury Lah	Al-Arabi; Al Ahli	11
1997–98	(Brazil) (Morocco) (Senegal)	Cláudio Prates; Hussein Ammouta; Alboury Lah	Al-Shamal; Al Sadd; Al Ahli	10
1998–99	(Angola)	Akwá	Al-Wakrah	11
1999–2000	(Qatar)	Mohammed Salem Al-Enazi	Al-Rayyan	14
2000–01	(Senegal)	Mamoun Diop	Al-Wakrah	14
2001–02	(Algeria)	Rachid Amrane	Al-Ittihad	16
2002–03	(Morocco)	Rachid Rokki	Al-Khor	15
2003–04	(Argentina)	Gabriel Batistuta	Al-Arabi	25
2004–05	(Brazil)	Sonny Anderson	Al-Rayyan	20
2005–06	(Ecuador)	Carlos Tenorio	Al Sadd	21
2006–07	(Iraq)	Younis Mahmoud	Al-Gharafa	24
2007–08	(Brazil)	Clemerson	Al-Gharafa	27
2008–09	(Brazil)	Magno Alves	Umm Salal	25
2009–10	(Brazil) (Iraq)	Caboré; Younis Mahmoud	Al-Arabi; Al-Gharafa	21
2010–11	(Iraq)	Younis Mahmoud	Al-Gharafa	15
2011–12	(Brazil)	Adriano	El Jaish	18
2012–13	(Qatar)	Sebastián Soria	Lekhwiya	19
2013–14	(Democratic Republic of the Congo)	Dioko Kaluyituka	Al Ahli	22
2014–15	(Democratic Republic of the Congo)	Dioko Kaluyituka	Al Ahli	25
2015–16	(Morocco) (Qatar)	Abderrazak Hamdallah; Rodrigo Tabata	El Jaish; Al-Rayyan	21
2016–17	(Morocco)	Youssef El-Arabi	Lekhwiya	24
2017–18	(Morocco)	Youssef El-Arabi	Al-Duhail	26
2018–19	(Algeria)	Baghdad Bounedjah	Al Sadd	39
2019–20	(Algeria) (Qatar)	Yacine Brahimi; Akram Afif	Al-Rayyan; Al Sadd	15
2020–21	(Algeria)	Baghdad Bounedjah	Al Sadd	21
2021–22	(Kenya)	Michael Olunga	Al-Duhail	24
2022–23	(Kenya)	Michael Olunga	Al-Duhail	22
2023–24	(Qatar)	Akram Afif	Al Sadd	26
2024–25	(Brazil)	Róger Guedes	Al-Rayyan	21
2025–26	(Brazil)	Róger Guedes	Al-Rayyan	21

=== By player ===
Rank	Player	Country	Titles	Seasons
1	Mansour Muftah	Qatar	7	1976–77, 1977–78, 1979–80, 1981–82, 1982–83, 1983–84, 1985–86
2	Mubarak Mustafa	Qatar	3	1991–92, 1992–93, 1996–97
2	Younis Mahmoud	Iraq	3	2006–07, 2009–10, 2010–11
4	Hassan Mattar	Qatar	2	1977–78, 1980–81
4	Hassan Sabela	Qatar	2	1986–87, 1990–91
4	Marquinho Carioca	Brazil	2	1989–90, 1993–94
4	Mahmoud Soufi	Qatar	2	1990–91, 1993–94
4	Mohammed Salem Al-Enazi	Qatar	2	1994–95, 1999–2000
4	Alboury Lah	Senegal	2	1996–97, 1997–98
4	Dioko Kaluyituka	Democratic Republic of the Congo	2	2013–14, 2014–15
4	Youssef El-Arabi	Morocco	2	2016–17, 2017–18
4	Baghdad Bounedjah	Algeria	2	2018–19, 2020–21
4	Akram Afif	Qatar	2	2019–20, 2023–24
4	Michael Olunga	Kenya	2	2021–22, 2022–23
4	Róger Guedes	Brazil	2	2024–25, 2025–26

== All-time top scorers ==
Rank	Nat	Name	Club	Years	Goals	Apps	Assists
1	(Qatar)	Sebastián Soria	Al-Gharafa, Qatar SC, Al-Rayyan, Al-Duhail, Al-Arabi	2004–	211	434	58
2	(Qatar)	Mansour Muftah	Al-Rayyan, Al-Wakrah	1973–1998	179	216	20+
3	(Algeria)	Baghdad Bounedjah	Al-Sadd, Al-Shamal	2015–	163	171	46
4	(Qatar)	Rodrigo Tabata	Al-Rayyan, Al-Sadd	2011–	148	282	102
5	(Iraq)	Younis Mahmoud	Al-Gharafa, Al-Sadd, Al-Arabi, Al-Khor, Al-Wakrah	2004–2013	131	190	4
6	(Qatar)	Meshal Abdullah	Al-Gharafa, Qatar SC, Al-Wakrah, Al-Sailiya, Al-Ahli	1999–2010	123	354	28
7	(Tunisia)	Youssef Msakni	Al-Arabi, Al-Duhail	2013–	111	186	60
8	(Qatar)	Akram Afif	Al-Sadd	2018–	107	127	69
9	(Qatar)	Hassan Al-Haydos	Al-Sadd	2007–	102	336	86
10	(South Korea)	Nam Tae-hee	Al-Sadd, Al-Duhail	2012–2023	94	231	75
11	(Qatar)	Mubarak Mustafa	Al-Arabi SC, Al-Khor, Al-Gharafa	1990–2007	91+	179+	42+
12	(Democratic Republic of the Congo)	Dioko Kaluyituka	Al-Duhail , Al-Gharafa, Al-Kharaitiyat, Muaither, Al-Ahli	2011–2017	84	121	12
13	(Qatar)	Khalfan Ibrahim	Al-Arabi , Al-Sadd, Al-Rayyan	2004–2020	83	241	49
14	(Morocco)	Youssef El-Arabi	Al-Duhail	2016–2019	76	59	13
15	(Kenya)	Michael Olunga	Al-Duhail, Al-Arabi	2021–	75	80	6
16	(Burkina Faso)	Moumouni Dagano	Al-Sailiya, Qatar SC, Al-Shamal, Al-Duhail, Al-Khor	2008–2015	72	158	20
17	(Angola)	Akwá	Qatar SC, Al-Gharafa, Al-Wakrah	1998–2006	70	123	
18	(Brazil)	Clemerson Araújo	Al-Gharafa	2007–2010	68	84	
19	(Morocco)	Rachid Rokki	Al-Khor, Umm Salal	2000–2008	65	118	
20	(Ecuador)	Carlos Tenorio	Al-Sadd	2003–2008	63	88	
21	(Argentina)	Leonardo Pisculichi	Al-Arabi	2007–2012	63	112	15
22	(Burkina Faso)	Yahia Kébé	Al-Kharaitiyat	2009–2016	58	132	21
23	(Croatia)	Wagner Ribeiro	Al-Sailiya, Al-Arabi, El Jaish, Al-Ahli	2009–2018	57	174	29
24	(Brazil)	Cabore	Umm Salal, Al-Arabi	2009–2014	57	90	15
25	(Qatar)	Mirghani Al Zain	Al-Gharafa, Al-Wakrah, Al-Sailiya	1996–2019	57	420	
26	(Algeria)	Yacine Brahimi	Al-Gharafa, Al-Rayyan	2019–	57	101	30
27	(Brazil)	Júlio César	Al-Khor, Al-Ahli	2009–2016	56	117	13
28	(Qatar)	Almoez Ali	Al-Duhail	2016–	56	161	
29	(Qatar)	Abdulgadir Ilyas Bakur	Al-Sailiya, Al-Arabi, El Jaish, Umm Salal, Al-Markhiya	2008–	55	184	39
30	(Oman)	Amad Al-Hosni	Qatar SC, Al-Rayyan	2005–2010	52	100	6
31	(Qatar)	Mohammed Muntari	El Jaish, Al-Duhail, Al Ahli, Al-Gharafa	2012–	52	152	
32	(Ivory Coast)	Yannick Sagbo	Umm Salal	2015–2020	51	98	12
33	(Algeria)	Mohamed Benyettou	Al-Wakrah	2019–	51	103	
34	(Qatar)	Ali Afif	Al-Sadd, Al-Duhail, Umm Salal	2015–	50	286	34
35	(Qatar)	Boualem Khoukhi	Al-Sadd, Al-Arabi	2009–	50	268	25

== See also ==
- Football in Qatar
- Qatar national football team
