= Al-Rayyan SC =

Association football club in Qatar

- Full name: Al-Rayyan Sports Club
- Nickname: The Lions
- Founded: 1967; 59 years ago
- Ground: Ahmad bin Ali Stadium
- Capacity: 40,032
- Chairman: Al Qaqa bin Hamad Al Thani
- Head coach: Vicente Moreno
- League: Qatar Stars League
- 2025–26: Qatar Stars League, 3rd of 12
- Website: alrayyansc.qa
| Home colours | Away colours | Third colours |

Al-Rayyan Sports Club (Arabic: نادي الريان الرياضي) is a Qatari multi-sports club fielding teams in a number of sports such as football, futsal, basketball, volleyball, handball, athletics, table tennis, and swimming. It is based at the Ahmad bin Ali Stadium in Umm Al Afaei in the city of Al Rayyan. The club was founded in 1967 after merging the old Rayyan team with Nusoor Club. The official team colours are red and black.

They have won numerous titles in all sports, including two Asian championships in basketball, the Arab championship in handball, futsal domestic titles, table tennis, and volleyball, as well as numerous GCC basketball, handball, and volleyball championships. Both the basketball and handball teams have qualified for the world championships. However, the football team gets the most attention from the club officials, media, and fans.

== History ==
=== 1967–1973: Founding ===
Al Rayyan's history goes back to the mid-1960s when it was known as Old Al Rayyan. Old Al Rayyan, though an amateur football team, competed in matches arranged throughout the whole country, not being limited to the city in which it was based. Their headquarters was in a two-bedroom house, and they played their matches on a football field in a school based in the New Rayyan area. The club relied on donations from the fans during this period.

In 1967, Al Rayyan began as a combination of two groups called " new Al Rayyan’sons and old al-Rayyan’son". In 1967, Al-Rayyan started its factory. From 1967 until now, Al-Rayyan has won many trophies not only in soccer even in the rest of the games such as handball, basketball and volleyball. The people who contributed to build Al Rayyan knew that this team would not be a regular team, but it will also represent the culture of the city of Al Rayyan outside of Qatar. In 2008, the club established magazine called SOUT AL RAYYAN (The Voice of Al Rayyan) which is the first magazine that cares about Al Rayyan news, and it is the only team's magazine in Qatar.

They applied to be a member club of the Qatar Football Association, but were rejected with the QFA proposing that they merge with Al Nusoor, a local sports club also based in Al Rayyan. In 1967, after an announcement by the Al Rayyan Sports Committee that Old Al Rayyan would merge with Al Nusoor, Al Rayyan SC was officially founded. A new headquarters was established to accommodate increased size demands as a result of the merger. The first head coach of Al Rayyan was Ashour Salem, a Sudanese national, who, besides working as a local physical education coach, trained the first team and youth team. In the early years, the club branched out to other sports, notably basketball and handball. As a result of donations from the club supporters, Al Rayyan was able to establish their home grounds in Doha Stadium, the largest stadium in Qatar at that time.

On the 23rd April 2026 Al Rayyan won the 2025–26 AGCFF Gulf Club Champions League for the first time in their history.

=== 1973–1988: Early history ===
The club had success in the Qatar Stars League within the first decade of its formation, with the club participating in their first official season in 1972–73. In the 1974–75, after a mass brawl between the fans and players of Al Rayyan and Al Sadd, the QFA relegated Al Rayyan, who were in 2nd place at the time, to the second division. They won back promotion the following season and achieved their first league title 1976. In the 1977 season, the QFA annulled the results of Al Rayyan due to actions which took place in a match against Al Arabi. The perpetrator, who was an Al Arabi player by the name of Yassin Mustafa, was banned permanently from all league matches whereas the two clubs were warned.

In 1983, under the leadership of Mohammed Bin Hammam Al Abdulla, a new club headquarters and home stadium were constructed. They won the league with a negative goal difference in 1983–84, making them one of the only 6 teams in the world and the only Qatari team in history to achieve this feat.

=== 1988–2000: Relegation and return to glory ===
In the 1987–88 season, much to the surprise of critics and fans, they got relegated for the first time in league history. The relegation was preceded by a 0–1 loss to Al Sadd, as Hassan Jowhar scored a header goal which would prove to be the final nail in the coffin of Al Rayyan. They won back promotion to the premier league in their first season in the second division.

They would go on to win the league in 1990, the same season they were promoted back to the first division, beating out rivals Al Sadd. They won an additional league title in 1995.

=== 2000–2013: League title drought ===
They inaugurated their home ground, Ahmed bin Ali Stadium, in 2003 during the reign of Sheikh Mishaal Al Thani. The first match held on the grounds was the 2003 Emir Cup finals.

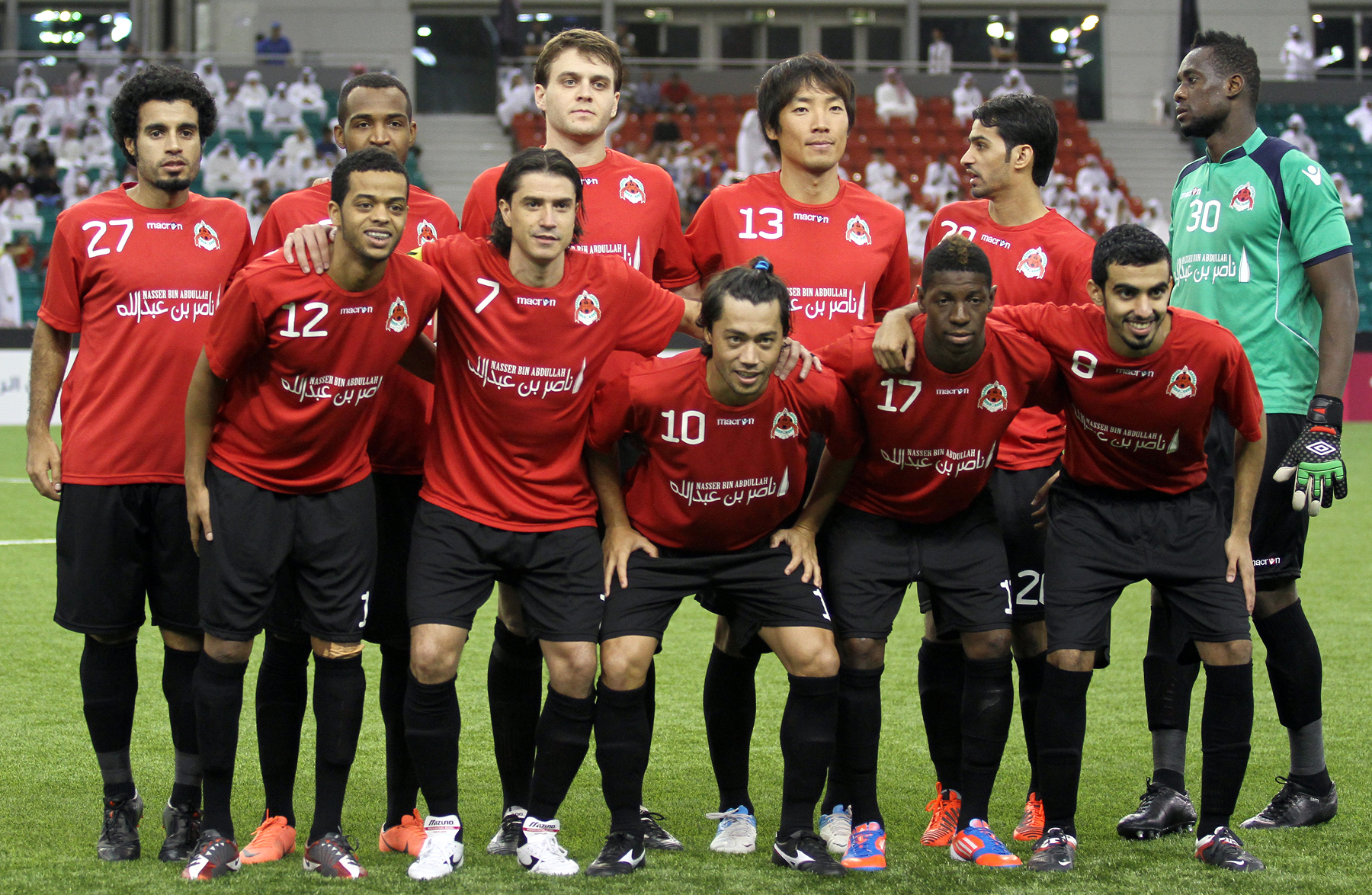
Al Rayyan football team in 2012.

The club has not experienced much league success as of late, with the last successful league campaign being in 1994–95; however they finished third in the 2010–11 season under Paulo Autuori. Nonetheless, they faced great success in the Emir's Cup and Heir Apparent Cup winning eight cups in total in 14 years.

=== 2014–: Return to success ===
In 2014–15 the club won the Qatargas League and returned to Qatar Stars League. On 28 November 2015, Al-Rayyan Broke the record of most consecutive league matches won to 11.

On 5 March 2016, after 21 years Al-Rayyan won the league once again, and became the first ever team to win both leagues in two years.

On the 23rd April 2026 Al Rayyan won the 2025–26 AGCFF Gulf Club Champions League for the first time in their history.

== Supporters ==
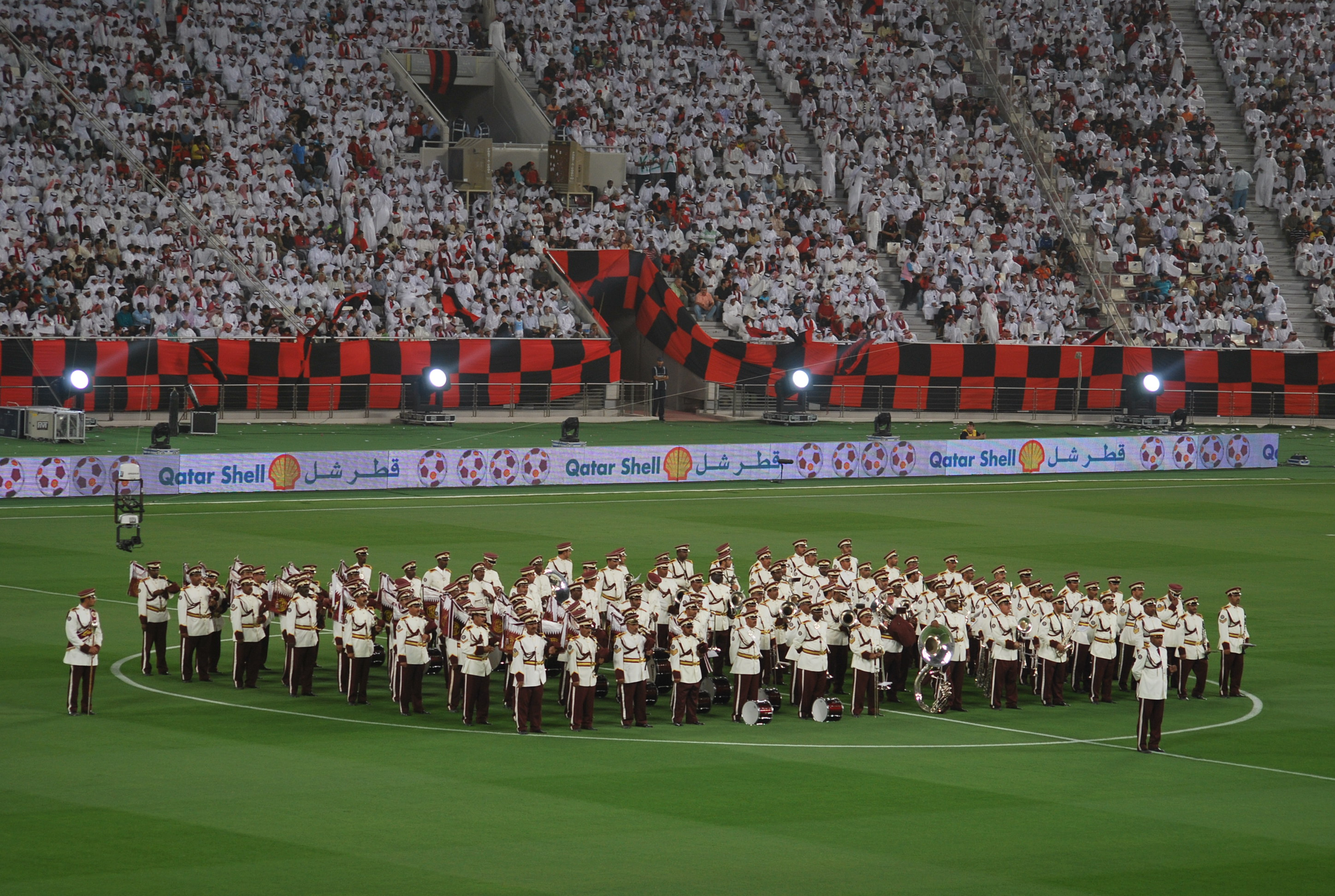
Al Rayyan fans in an Emir Cup final.

Al-Rayyan is one of the most popular clubs in Qatar and is supported throughout the Gulf region, as well as other parts of the world due to their high-profile signings. In 2010, they had the highest attendance in the Qatar Stars League. The fan club won the QFA-sanctioned award of "best fans" in the 2008–09 season, and shared the award with Al Sadd in the 2012–13 season.

== Rivalries ==
=== Al Arabi ===
==== Head-to-head ====
Since 1994 Updated 26 September 2023

Head-to-head
| Competition | P | W | D | ND | L | GF | GA | GD | CSF | CSA | Top Scorer For | Top Scorer Against |
|---|---|---|---|---|---|---|---|---|---|---|---|---|
| Qatar Stars League | 63 | 27 | 19 | 3 | 17 | 108 | 87 | +21 | 17 | 8 | Sonny Anderson (8) | Waleed Hamzah (8) |

=== Al Sadd ===
==== Head-to-head ====
Since 1995 Updated 22 September 2023

Head-to-head
| Competition | P | W | D | ND | L | GF | GA | GD | CSF | CSA | Top Scorer For | Top Scorer Against |
|---|---|---|---|---|---|---|---|---|---|---|---|---|
| Qatar Stars League | 61 | 20 | 13 | 5 | 28 | 79 | 104 | -25 | 13 | 19 | Rodrigo Tabata (4) | Baghdad Bounedjah (14) |

=== Al Gharafa ===
==== Head-to-head ====
Since 1995 Updated 21 September 2023

Head-to-head
| Competition | P | W | D | ND | L | GF | GA | GD | CSF | CSA | Top Scorer For | Top Scorer Against |
|---|---|---|---|---|---|---|---|---|---|---|---|---|
| Qatar Stars League | 59 | 15 | 18 | 3 | 26 | 87 | 109 | -22 | 8 | 12 | Rodrigo Tabata (10) | Younis Mahmoud (9) |

=== Al Duhail ===
==== Head-to-head ====
Updated 21 September 2023

Head-to-head
| Competition | P | W | D | ND | L | GF | GA | GD | CSF | CSA | Top Scorer For | Top Scorer Against |
|---|---|---|---|---|---|---|---|---|---|---|---|---|
| Qatar Stars League | 24 | 6 | 7 | 2 | 11 | 36 | 45 | -9 | 4 | 7 | Sebastián Soria (5) | Youssef El-Arabi (6) |

== Honours ==
=== Domestic ===
As of 1 May 2026

League

- Qatar Stars League
  - Champions (8): 1975–76, 1977–78, 1981–82, 1983–84, 1985–86, 1989–90, 1994–95, 2015–16

Cup

- Emir of Qatar Cup
  - Champions (6): 1998–99, 2003–04, 2005–06, 2010, 2011, 2013
- Qatar Cup
  - Champions (4): 1995, 1996, 2001, 2012
- Sheikh Jassim Cup
  - Champions (5): 1992, 2000, 2012, 2013, 2018
- QSL Cup
  - Champions (1): 2025–26

=== Regional ===
- AGCFF Gulf Club Champions League
  - Champions (1): 2025–26

== Continental record ==
| Season | Competition | Round | Opponent | Home | Away | Aggregate |
|---|---|---|---|---|---|---|
| 1991 | Asian Club Championship | 1R | (Oman) Al-Orouba | 4–2 | 1−0 | 5–2 |
| 1991 | Asian Club Championship | QF | (Thailand) Port Authority | 3–1 | | 1st |
| 1991 | Asian Club Championship | QF | (United Arab Emirates) Al Shabab | 2–1 | | 1st |
| 1991 | Asian Club Championship | QF | (Bangladesh) Mohammedan | 3–1 | | 1st |
| 1991 | Asian Club Championship | SF | (Iran) Esteghlal | 1–2 | | 1–2 |
| 1991 | Asian Club Championship | Third Place | (United Arab Emirates) Al Shabab | 2–2 | | 2–2 (5–4 p) |
| 1996–97 | Asian Club Championship | 2R | (Kuwait) Kazma | 1–1 | 1−0 | 2–1 |
| 1996–97 | Asian Club Championship | QF | (Saudi Arabia) Al-Nassr | 2–1 | | 4th |
| 1996–97 | Asian Club Championship | QF | (Iraq) Al-Zawraa | 0–2 | | 4th |
| 1996–97 | Asian Club Championship | QF | (Iran) Persepolis | 1–2 | | 4th |
| 1997–98 | Asian Club Championship | 1R | (Bahrain) Al-Riffa | – | – | w/o |
| 1997–98 | Asian Club Championship | 2R | (Saudi Arabia) Al-Hilal | 0–0 | 2–3 | 2–3 |
| 2005 | AFC Champions League | Group A | (Iran) PAS Tehran | 1–2 | 1–2 | 3rd |
| 2005 | AFC Champions League | Group A | (Kuwait) Al-Salmiya | 2–1 | 0–2 | 3rd |
| 2005 | AFC Champions League | Group A | (Iraq) Al-Shorta | 2–0 | 0–0 | 3rd |
| 2007 | AFC Champions League | Group A | (United Arab Emirates) Al Wahda | 0–1 | 0–3 | 4th |
| 2007 | AFC Champions League | Group A | (Iraq) Al-Zawraa | 1–3 | 0–0 | 4th |
| 2007 | AFC Champions League | Group A | (Kuwait) Al-Arabi | 1–3 | 1–1 | 4th |
| 2010 | AFC Cup | Group E | (Jordan) Al-Wehdat | 3–0 | 4–2 | 1st |
| 2010 | AFC Cup | Group E | (Oman) Al-Nahda | 3–2 | 2–0 | 1st |
| 2010 | AFC Cup | Group E | (Bahrain) Al-Riffa | 0–2 | 4–1 | 1st |
| 2010 | AFC Cup | R16 | (Thailand) Muangthong United | 1–1 | – | 1–1 (2–4 p) |
| 2011 | AFC Champions League | Group D | (Saudi Arabia) Al-Shabab | 1–1 | 0–1 | 4th |
| 2011 | AFC Champions League | Group D | (United Arab Emirates) Emirates | 2–0 | 0–2 | 4th |
| 2011 | AFC Champions League | Group D | (Iran) Zob Ahan | 1–3 | 0–1 | 4th |
| 2012 | AFC Champions League | Group A | (Iran) Esteghlal | 0–1 | 0–3 | 3rd |
| 2012 | AFC Champions League | Group A | (United Arab Emirates) Al Jazira | 3–4 | 2–3 | 3rd |
| 2012 | AFC Champions League | Group A | (Uzbekistan) Nasaf Qarshi | 3–1 | 1–0 | 3rd |
| 2013 | AFC Champions League | Group D | (Iran) Esteghlal | 3–3 | 0–3 | 4th |
| 2013 | AFC Champions League | Group D | (Saudi Arabia) Al-Hilal | 0–2 | 1–3 | 4th |
| 2013 | AFC Champions League | Group D | (United Arab Emirates) Al Ain | 2–1 | 1–2 | 4th |
| 2014 | AFC Champions League | Group A | (United Arab Emirates) Al Jazira | 2–3 | 2–3 | 4th |
| 2014 | AFC Champions League | Group A | (Iran) Esteghlal | 1–0 | 1–3 | 4th |
| 2014 | AFC Champions League | Group A | (Saudi Arabia) Al-Shabab | 0–2 | 3–4 | 4th |
| 2017 | AFC Champions League | Group D | (United Arab Emirates) Al Wahda | 2–1 | 1–5 | 3rd |
| 2017 | AFC Champions League | Group D | (Saudi Arabia) Al-Hilal | 3–4 | 1–2 | 3rd |
| 2017 | AFC Champions League | Group D | (Iran) Persepolis | 3–1 | 0–0 | 3rd |
| 2018 | AFC Champions League | Group D | (Iran) Esteghlal | 2–2 | 0–2 | 3rd |
| 2018 | AFC Champions League | Group D | (United Arab Emirates) Al Ain | 1–4 | 1–1 | 3rd |
| 2018 | AFC Champions League | Group D | (Saudi Arabia) Al-Hilal | 2–1 | 1–1 | 3rd |
| 2019 | AFC Champions League | PO | (Iran) Saipa | 3–1 | – | 3–1 |
| 2019 | AFC Champions League | Group B | (Saudi Arabia) Al-Ittihad | 0–2 | 1–5 | 4th |
| 2019 | AFC Champions League | Group B | (Uzbekistan) Lokomotiv Tashkent | 2–1 | 2–3 | 4th |
| 2019 | AFC Champions League | Group B | (United Arab Emirates) Al Wahda | 1–2 | 3–4 | 4th |
| 2020 | AFC Champions League | PO | (Iran) Esteghlal | 0–5 | – | 0–5 |
| 2021 | AFC Champions League | Group E | (India) Goa | 1–1 | 0–0 | 4th |
| 2021 | AFC Champions League | Group E | (Iran) Persepolis | 1–3 | 2–4 | 4th |
| 2021 | AFC Champions League | Group E | (United Arab Emirates) Al Wahda | 0–1 | 2–3 | 4th |
| 2022 | AFC Champions League | Group A | (Tajikistan) Istiklol | 1–0 | 3–2 | 2nd |
| 2022 | AFC Champions League | Group A | (Saudi Arabia) Al-Hilal | 0–3 | 2–0 | 2nd |
| 2022 | AFC Champions League | Group A | (United Arab Emirates) Sharjah | 3–1 | 1–1 | 2nd |
| 2022 | AFC Champions League | R16 | (Qatar) Al-Duhail | 1–1 | | 1–1 (6–7 p) |
| 2024–25 | AFC Champions League Elite | West Region | (Saudi Arabia) Al-Hilal | 1–3 | —N/a | 7th |
| 2024–25 | AFC Champions League Elite | West Region | (Saudi Arabia) Al-Nassr | —N/a | 1–2 | 7th |
| 2024–25 | AFC Champions League Elite | West Region | (Saudi Arabia) Al-Ahli | 1–2 | —N/a | 7th |
| 2024–25 | AFC Champions League Elite | West Region | (Uzbekistan) Pakhtakor | —N/a | 1–0 | 7th |
| 2024–25 | AFC Champions League Elite | West Region | (Iran) Persepolis | 1–1 | —N/a | 7th |
| 2024–25 | AFC Champions League Elite | West Region | (United Arab Emirates) Al Wasl | —N/a | 1–1 | 7th |
| 2024–25 | AFC Champions League Elite | West Region | (United Arab Emirates) Al Ain | —N/a | 2–1 | 7th |
| 2024–25 | AFC Champions League Elite | West Region | (Iran) Esteghlal | 0–2 | —N/a | 7th |
| 2024–25 | AFC Champions League Elite | R16 | (Saudi Arabia) Al-Ahli | 1–3 | 0–2 | 1–5 |

Key: PO – Play-off round; 1R/2R – First/Second round; R16 – Round of 16; QF – Quarter-final; SF – Semi-final;

Notes

Al-Riffa withdrew.

== Stadium ==
Ahmad bin Ali Stadium (Al-Rayyan Stadium)
- Al-Rayyan Stadium
- Full name: Ahmad bin Ali Stadium
- Location: Rawdat Al Jahhaniya, Al Rayyan, Qatar
- Capacity: 44,740 (football)
- Surface: Grass

Construction
- Built: 2016
- Opened: 2020

Ahmad bin Ali Stadium (Arabic: ملعب أحمد بن علي), popularly known as the Al-Rayyan Stadium, is a multi-purpose stadium in Al-Rayyan, Qatar which serves as the home stadium for Al Rayyan's football section. It was used as a venue for the 2022 FIFA World Cup. The construction of the new stadium started in early 2016. This was done by the joint venture between Al-Balagh and Larsen & Toubro. After the World Cup the stadium will be reduced to 21,000 seats. The new stadium was built for the 2022 FIFA World Cup, which was hosted by Qatar.

== Asian competitions goals ==
Statistics correct as March 7, 2023

| P | Player | Goals | Games |
|---|---|---|---|
| 1 | (Qatar) Rodrigo Tabata | 11 | 32 |
| 2 | (Venezuela) Gelmin Rivas | 6 | 6 |
| = | (Ivory Coast) Yohan Boli | 6 | 13 |
| 4 | (Qatar) Mansour Muftah | 4 | |
| = | (Qatar) Sebastián Soria | 4 | 17 |
| = | (Nigeria) Kalu Uche | 4 | 3 |
| 7 | (Brazil) Nilmar | 3 | 6 |
| = | (France) Steven Nzonzi | 3 | 7 |
| = | (Morocco) Abdeslam Laghrissi | 3 | |
| = | (Qatar) Mohammed Salem Al-Enazi | 3 | |
| = | (Uruguay) Gonzalo Viera | 3 | 18 |
| = | (Spain) Sergio García | 3 | 6 |
| = | (Morocco) Abderrazak Hamdallah | 3 | 5 |

== Players ==
As of Qatar Stars League:

=== First team ===
Note: Flags indicate national team as defined under FIFA eligibility rules; some limited exceptions apply. Players may hold more than one non-FIFA nationality.

| No. | Pos. | Nation | Player |
|---|---|---|---|
| 2 | DF | QAT | Abdalla Yousif |
| 3 | DF | QAT | Hazem Shehata |
| 4 | MF | BEL | Julien De Sart |
| 5 | DF | ESP | David García |
| 6 | MF | QAT | Abdulaziz Hatem |
| 7 | FW | BRA | Wesley |
| 8 | MF | QAT | Jassem Gaber |
| 9 | FW | SRB | Aleksandar Mitrović |
| 10 | FW | BRA | Róger Guedes |
| 11 | MF | BRA | Gabriel Pereira |
| 12 | DF | QAT | Ahmed Al-Minhali |
| 13 | DF | POR | André Amaro |
| 15 | MF | QAT | Mostafa Essam |
| 16 | MF | QAT | Jassem Al-Sharshani |
| 17 | DF | QAT | Yousef Aymen (on loan from Al-Duhail) |
| 19 | FW | QAT | Ahmed Al-Rawi |

| No. | Pos. | Nation | Player |
|---|---|---|---|
| 20 | MF | QAT | Khalid Ali Sabah |
| 21 | MF | QAT | Ibrahim Al-Hassan |
| 22 | FW | QAT | Ahmed Al Ganehi |
| 23 | GK | ALG | Sami Habib Beldi |
| 24 | DF | QAT | Hassan Al-Ghareeb |
| 25 | MF | POR | Otávio (on loan from Al-Qadsiah) |
| 26 | MF | QAT | Osama Al-Tairi |
| 30 | FW | QAT | Ahmed Alaaeldin |
| 31 | MF | POR | Diogo Amaro |
| 33 | DF | MLI | Daouda Diakité |
| 35 | GK | QAT | Sami Mazen |
| 40 | MF | BRA | Gregore |
| 55 | DF | PLE | Mohammed Saleh |
| 57 | GK | QAT | Mahmud Abunada |
| — | DF | QAT | Abdullah Al-Ali |

=== Al-Rayyan NextGen ===
Note: Flags indicate national team as defined under FIFA eligibility rules; some limited exceptions apply. Players may hold more than one non-FIFA nationality.

| No. | Pos. | Nation | Player |
|---|---|---|---|
| 27 | FW | QAT | Moustafa El-Sayed |
| 41 | MF | OMA | Fahad Ahmed |
| 42 | FW | QAT | Yousef Al-Alawi |
| 43 | DF | IRL | Cas Leadbetter |
| 45 | MF | QAT | Ghanim Rashtiya |
| 47 | MF | QAT | Faisal Al-Nouman |
| 50 | GK | QAT | Assem Othman |

| No. | Pos. | Nation | Player |
|---|---|---|---|
| 66 | MF | YEM | Abdulrahman Al-Ashwal |
| 71 | DF | QAT | Nayef Hamid |
| 74 | MF | QAT | Amir Zarei |
| 76 | MF | SYR | Abdulhamid Al-Jassim |
| 79 | MF | YEM | Mohammed Al-Yazidi |
| 94 | FW | QAT | Ali Al-Qahtani |
| 99 | MF | QAT | Abdulla Anad |

=== Out on loan ===
Note: Flags indicate national team as defined under FIFA eligibility rules; some limited exceptions apply. Players may hold more than one non-FIFA nationality.

| No. | Pos. | Nation | Player |
|---|---|---|---|
| 18 | DF | QAT | Bahaa Ellethy (at Al-Shahaniya) |
| 44 | MF | QAT | Naif Al-Hadhrami (at Lusail) |

| No. | Pos. | Nation | Player |
|---|---|---|---|
| 88 | MF | QAT | Moameen Mutasem (at Al-Shahaniya) |
| — | DF | ESP | Simo (at Al-Wakrah) |

== Technical staff ==
Last update: August 2023.

=== First team ===
| Position | Staff |
|---|---|
| Head coach | (Spain) Vicente Moreno |
| Assistant coach | (Qatar) Mubarak Yousif (Qatar) Mohammed Hamid |
| Goalkeeping coach | (Qatar) Khalid Al-Shammari |
| Goalkeeping assistant coach | (Qatar) Aman Al-Gaber |
| Fitness coach | (Qatar) Mostafa Al-Minhali |
| Head of Performance | (Italy) Andrea Azzalin |
| Club analyst | (Brazil) Yuri Souza |
| Analyst | (Ukraine) Stanislav Goncharenko |
| Rehab RTP | (Republic of Ireland) Gavin Donoghue |
| Translator | (Saudi Arabia) (Brazil) Amir Al-Hamdan |

=== Notable players ===
This list includes players whom have made significant contributions to their national team and to the club. At least 90 caps for the club or 100 caps for their national team is needed to be considered for inclusion.

Local players

- (Qatar) Mansour Muftah – 324 caps
- (Qatar) Younes Ali – 118 caps
- (Qatar) Mohammed Al Enazi – 92 caps
- (Qatar) Waleed Jassem – 99 caps
- (Qatar) Adel Lami – 91 caps
- (Qatar) Ali Rahma Al Marri – 121 caps
- (Qatar) Abdulrahman Mesbeh – 204 caps
- (Qatar) Salman Mesbeh – 187 caps

Foreign players

- Frank de Boer – 112 caps for Netherlands
- Bashar Abdullah – 133 caps for Kuwait
- Ahmed Mubarak – 101 caps for Oman
- Amad Al-Hosni – 100 caps for Oman
- Jasem Al Huwaidi – 100 caps for Kuwait
- Hassan Mudhafar – 111 caps for Oman
- Jamal Mubarak – 108 caps for Kuwait

== Managerial history ==
Present and past managers of Al-Rayyan from 1967 (incomplete):

- (Sudan) Salem Ashour (1967–??), (1973–??)^{1}
- (Egypt) Saleh Youssef (ca. 1976)^{2}
- (England) Powell (1976–??)^{3}
- (Egypt) Abdul Moneim Al Haj (1981–83)
- (Brazil) Vavá (1984–85)
- (England) Wayne Jones (1985)
- (England) Alan Dicks (1985)
- (England) Colin Dobson (1985–87)
- (Brazil) Vavá (ca. 1989)
- (England) Alan Dicks (1989–90)
- (Egypt) Abdul Moneim Al Haj (1990)
- (Brazil) René Simões (1 July 1990–91)
- (Brazil) Luis Alberto (1991–92)
- (Brazil) René Simões (1992 – 30 June 1993)
- (Brazil) Cabralzinho (1993–94)
- (Denmark) Jørgen E. Larsen (1 July 1994 – 30 June 1995)
- (Brazil) Evaristo de Macedo (1995)
- (Denmark) Benny Johansen (1 July 1995–96)
- (Qatar) Eid Mubarak (1996–97)
- (Poland) Antoni Piechniczek (1997)
- (Poland) Zdzisław Podedworny (1997–98)
- (England) Allan Jones (1998)
- (Denmark) Roald Poulsen (1998–99)
- (Denmark) Jørgen E. Larsen (1 July 1999 – 30 June 2000)
- (Brazil) Dutra (2000)
- (Brazil) Paulo Campos (2000)
- (Brazil) Santos (2000–01)
- (Brazil) Paulo Henrique (2001–02)
- (Brazil) Amarildo (2002)
- (France) Jean Castaneda (2002–04)
- (Sweden) Bosse Nilsson (2004)
- (Denmark) Jørgen E. Larsen (1 July 2004 – 30 June 2005)
- (Netherlands) Ron van den Berg (2005)
- (France) Luis Fernández (26 June 2005 – 15 Nov 2005)
- (Morocco) Hassan Hormatallah (Nov 2005–05)
- (France) Ladislas Lozano (2005–06)
- (Algeria) Rabah Madjer (2006 – 30 June 2006)
- (France) Pierre Lechantre (2006–07)
- (Brazil) Paulo Autuori (2 May 2007 – 17 May 2009)
- (Brazil) Marcos Paquetá (1 July 2009 – 30 June 2010)
- (Brazil) Paulo Autuori (21 Nov 2009 – 30 June 2011)
- (Uruguay) Diego Aguirre (Sept 6, 2011 – 3 Nov 2013)
- (Serbia) Rastko Stojkovic (2013)
- (Spain) Manuel Jiménez (4 Nov 2013 – 20 May 2015)
- (Uruguay) Jorge Fossati (20 May 2015 – 3 October 2016)
- (Denmark) Michael Laudrup (26 September 2016 – 30 June 2018)
- (Argentina) Rodolfo Arruabarrena (5 July 2018 – 8 October 2018)
- (Turkey) Bülent Uygun (10 October 2018 – 5 March 2019 )
- (Brazil) Gilson (6 March 2019 – 30 June 2019)
- (Uruguay) Diego Aguirre (28 May 2019 – 11 December 2020)
- (Qatar) Fábio César (10 December 2020 – 18 December 2020)
- (France) Laurent Blanc (19 December 2020 – 13 February 2022)
- (Chile) Nicolás Córdova (13 February 2022 – 30 June 2023)
- (Portugal) Leonardo Jardim (1 July 2023 – 30 June 2024)
- (Sweden) Poya Asbaghi (1 July 2024 – 24 September 2024)
- (Qatar) Younes Ali (24 September 2024 – 3 January 2025)
- (Portugal) Artur Jorge (4 January 2025 – 19 March 2026)

=== Administrative managers ===
- (Egypt) Ashraf Mehdi (1984–85)
- (Egypt) Saad Abu El Dahab (1985–)

Notes

- 1. Non-professional coach; worked as local physical education teacher.
- 2. First professional coach.
- 3. First non-Arab coach.
