= 2015 Toulon Tournament squads =

Below are the squads for the 2015 Toulon Tournament. Each team had to submit a maximum of 20 players. Players born no earlier than 1993 are eligible for the tournament.

Players in boldface have been capped at full international level at some point in their career.

== Group A ==
=== Costa Rica ===
Coach: Costa Rica Luis Fallas

No.	Pos.	Player	Date of birth (age)	Caps	Goals	Club
1	GK	Darryl Parker	7 March 1993 (aged 22)			(Costa Rican Football Federation) Club Sport Uruguay de Coronado
12	GK	Carlos Martínez	21 April 1993 (aged 22)			(Costa Rican Football Federation) Saprissa II
2	DF	Bryan Espinoza	26 March 1994 (aged 21)			(Costa Rican Football Federation) A.D. Belén
3	DF	William Fernández	15 May 1994 (aged 21)			(Costa Rican Football Federation) Cartaginés
4	DF	Steve Garita	10 September 1993 (aged 21)			(Costa Rican Football Federation) Alajuelense
5	DF	**Joseph Mora**	15 January 1993 (aged 22)			(Costa Rican Football Federation) Saprissa
13	DF	William Quirós	19 October 1994 (aged 20)			(Costa Rican Football Federation) A.D. Belén
14	DF	**Julio Cascante**	3 October 1993 (aged 21)			(Costa Rican Football Federation) UCR
6	MF	Mauricio Ayales	28 May 1993 (aged 21)			(Costa Rican Football Federation) Escazuceña
7	MF	Randy Chirino	16 January 1996 (aged 19)			(Costa Rican Football Federation) San Carlos
8	MF	**Allan Cruz**	24 February 1996 (aged 19)			(Costa Rican Football Federation) Saprissa II
11	MF	**Dylan Flores**	30 May 1993 (aged 21)			(Costa Rican Football Federation) Club Sport Uruguay de Coronado
15	MF	**Cristian Martínez**	1 January 1994 (aged 21)			(Costa Rican Football Federation) Municipal Liberia
16	MF	**Rónald Matarrita**	9 July 1994 (aged 20)			(Costa Rican Football Federation) Alajuelense
17	MF	**Ulises Segura**	23 June 1993 (aged 21)			(Costa Rican Football Federation) Club Sport Uruguay de Coronado
18	MF	Luis Sequeira	11 May 1994 (aged 21)			(Costa Rican Football Federation) Alajuelense
9	FW	**Ariel Lassiter**	27 September 1994 (aged 20)			(United States Soccer Federation) LA Galaxy II
10	FW	**David Ramírez**	28 May 1993 (aged 21)			(French Football Federation) Evian Thonon Gaillard F.C.
19	FW	Francisco Rodríguez	8 February 1993 (aged 22)			(Costa Rican Football Federation) Alajuelense
20	FW	**John Jairo Ruiz**	10 January 1994 (aged 21)			(Royal Belgian Football Association) Oostende

=== France ===
Coach: France Ludovic Batelli

No.	Pos.	Player	Date of birth (age)	Caps	Club
1	GK	Thomas Didillon	28 November 1995 (aged 19)	2	(Belgium) Seraing United
2	DF	**Damien Dussaut**	8 November 1994 (aged 20)	1	(Belgium) Standard Liège
3	DF	Louis Nganioni	3 June 1995 (aged 19)	3	(France) Lyon
4	DF	**Presnel Kimpembe**	13 August 1995 (aged 19)	2	(France) Paris Saint-Germain
5	DF	Stéphane Sparagna	17 February 1995 (aged 20)	3	(France) Marseille
6	MF	Yann Bodiger	9 February 1995 (aged 20)	3	(France) Toulouse
7	FW	Jean-Luc Dompé	12 August 1995 (aged 19)	2	(France) Valenciennes
8	MF	Adrien Hunou	19 January 1994 (aged 21)	7	(France) Clermont
9	FW	Enzo Crivelli	6 February 1995 (aged 20)	2	(France) Bordeaux
10	MF	Younès Kaabouni	23 May 1995 (aged 20)	4	(France) Bordeaux
11	MF	**Thomas Lemar**	12 November 1995 (aged 19)	4	(France) Caen
12	MF	**Marco Ilaimaharitra**	26 July 1995 (aged 19)	0	(France) Sochaux
13	MF	Baptiste Santamaria	9 March 1995 (aged 20)	0	(France) Tours
14	FW	Ulrich N'Nomo	28 February 1996 (aged 19)	0	(France) Châteauroux
15	DF	Raphaël Diarra	27 May 1995 (aged 20)	3	(France) Monaco
16	GK	Louis Souchaud	10 September 1995 (aged 19)	3	(France) Châteauroux
17	DF	Jordan Diakiese	5 July 1995 (aged 19)	0	(France) Paris Saint-Germain
18	MF	Farès Bahlouli	8 April 1995 (aged 20)	0	(France) Lyon
19	FW	Aristote Madiani	22 August 1995 (aged 19)	0	(France) Lens
20	FW	Romain Habran	14 June 1994 (aged 20)	0	(France) Sochaux

=== United States ===
Coach: (Austria) Andreas Herzog

No.	Pos.	Player	Date of birth (age)	Caps	Club
1	GK	Cody Cropper	16 February 1993 (aged 22)		(England) MK Dons
18	GK	Charlie Horton	14 September 1994 (aged 20)		(Wales) Cardiff City
12	GK	Tyler Miller	12 March 1993 (aged 22)		(Germany) SVN Zweibrücken
4	DF	Juan Pablo Ocegueda	13 July 1993 (aged 21)		(Mexico) Oaxaca
13	DF	Boyd Okwuonu	24 February 1993 (aged 22)		(United States) Real Salt Lake
15	DF	Shane O'Neill	2 September 1993 (aged 21)		(United States) Colorado Rapids
2	DF	Will Packwood	21 May 1993 (aged 22)		(England) Birmingham City F.C.
20	DF	Jalen Robinson	5 August 1994 (aged 20)		(United States) D.C. United
3	DF	Sam Strong	23 August 1996 (aged 18)		(United States) UC Santa Barbara
5	DF	Tyler Turner	4 March 1996 (aged 19)		(United States) Orlando City
16	MF	Fatai Alashe	21 October 1993 (aged 21)		(United States) San Jose Earthquakes
6	MF	Benji Joya	22 September 1993 (aged 21)		(Mexico) Santos Laguna
8	MF	Daniel Metzger	6 August 1993 (aged 21)		(United States) New York Red Bulls II
10	MF	Marc Pelosi	14 June 1994 (aged 20)		(England) Liverpool
19	MF	Dillon Serna	25 March 1994 (aged 21)		(United States) Colorado Rapids
7	FW	**Julian Green**	6 June 1995 (aged 19)		(Germany) Bayern Munich
17	FW	Alonso Hernández	1 March 1994 (aged 21)		(Mexico) Monterrey
11	FW	**Jerome Kiesewetter**	9 February 1993 (aged 22)		(Germany) VfB Stuttgart
14	FW	Alfred Koroma Shams	19 April 1994 (aged 21)		(United States) Austin Aztex
9	FW	**Jordan Morris**	26 October 1994 (aged 20)		(United States) Stanford University

=== Netherlands ===
Coach:Remy Reijnierse

No.	Pos.	Player	Date of birth (age)	Caps	Club
16	GK	Jesse Bertrams	22 December 1994 (aged 20)		(Netherlands) PSV
1	GK	Timo Plattel	12 March 1994 (aged 21)		(Netherlands) Twente
2	DF	**Hans Hateboer**	9 January 1994 (aged 21)		(Netherlands) Groningen
5	DF	Bas Kuipers	17 August 1994 (aged 20)		(Netherlands) Excelsior
3	DF	Derrick Luckassen	3 July 1995 (aged 19)		(Netherlands) AZ Alkmaar
13	DF	Jordy de Wijs	8 January 1995 (aged 20)		(Netherlands) PSV
12	DF	Peet Bijen	28 January 1995 (aged 20)		(Netherlands) Twente
4	MF	Danny Bakker	16 January 1995 (aged 20)		(Netherlands) ADO Den Haag
8	MF	**Thom Haye**	9 February 1995 (aged 20)		(Netherlands) AZ Alkmaar
17	MF	Jelle van der Heyden	31 August 1995 (aged 19)		(Netherlands) Twente
15	MF	**Sean Klaiber**	31 July 1994 (aged 20)		(Netherlands) Utrecht
6	MF	Clint Leemans	15 September 1995 (aged 19)		(Netherlands) PSV
10	MF	Joris van Overeem	1 June 1994 (aged 20)		(Netherlands) Dordrecht
9	MF	Rai Vloet	8 May 1995 (aged 20)		(Netherlands) PSV
14	MF	Django Warmerdam	2 September 1995 (aged 19)		(Netherlands) Ajax
20	FW	Brahim Darri	14 September 1994 (aged 20)		(Netherlands) Heracles Almelo
11	FW	**Anwar El Ghazi**	3 May 1995 (aged 20)		(Netherlands) Ajax
19	FW	**Vincent Janssen**	15 June 1994 (aged 20)		(Netherlands) Almere City
18	FW	Elvio van Overbeek	11 January 1994 (aged 21)		(Netherlands) PSV
7	FW	Mohamed Rayhi	1 July 1994 (aged 20)		(Netherlands) PSV

=== Qatar ===
Coach:

No.	Pos.	Player	Date of birth (age)	Caps	Goals	Club
1		Satea Abdelnasser	11 September 1993 (aged 21)			(Qatar Football Association) Al Ahli
2		Khidir Mohamed Musaab	1 January 1993 (aged 22)			(Qatar Football Association) Al Sadd
3		Huthaifa Yahya Ali Al-Salemi	7 February 1994 (aged 21)			(Qatar Football Association) Al Gharafa
4		Mohammed Al-Saeed	25 March 1993 (aged 22)			(Qatar Football Association) Al Khor
5		Abdulaziz Abdulla Shareef	9 February 1993 (aged 22)			(Qatar Football Association) Al Shahania
6		Ali Bazmandegan	10 March 1993 (aged 22)			(Qatar Football Association) Lekhwiya
7		**Ahmed Alaaeldin**	31 January 1993 (aged 22)			(Qatar Football Association) Al Rayyan
8		**Ahmed Fathy Abdoulla**	25 January 1993 (aged 22)			(Qatar Football Association) Al Arabi
9		**Othman Alawi Alyahri**	24 June 1993 (aged 21)			(Qatar Football Association) Al Gharafa
10		Saleh Bader Al Yazidi	10 February 1993 (aged 22)			(Qatar Football Association) Al Sadd
11		**Ahmed Fadhil**	7 April 1993 (aged 22)			(Qatar Football Association) Al Wakhrah
12		**Abdulrahman Al Harazi**	1 January 1994 (aged 21)			(Qatar Football Association) Al Sailiya
13		Yousuf Alkubaisi	16 March 1993 (aged 22)			(Qatar Football Association) Qatar SC
14		Nasser Al-Khalfan	17 October 1993 (aged 21)			(Qatar Football Association) Umm Salal
15		Ali Alob	31 October 1993 (aged 21)			(Qatar Football Association) Al Sailiya
16		**Ali Awad Bujaloof**	27 April 1995 (aged 20)			(Qatar Football Association) Qatar SC
17		**Mohammed Alaaeldin**	24 January 1994 (aged 21)			(Qatar Football Association) Al Rayyan
18		Shaheen Al Kuwari	14 August 1995 (aged 19)			(Qatar Football Association) El Jaish
19		Ali Ahmad Ghaderi	2 February 1994 (aged 21)			(Qatar Football Association) Al Ahli
20		Abdulrahman Alkorbi	18 August 1994 (aged 20)			(Qatar Football Association) Al Rayyan

== Group B ==
=== China PR ===
Coach: Fu Bo

No.	Pos.	Player	Date of birth (age)	Caps	Goals	Club
1	GK	Fang Jingqi	17 January 1993 (aged 22)			(Chinese Football Association) Guangzhou Evergrande
2	DF	Zhang Xiaobin	23 October 1993 (aged 21)			(Chinese Football Association) Jiangsu Sainty
4	DF	Yang Ting	4 June 1993 (aged 21)			(Royal Belgian Football Association) Tubize
5	DF	Pan Ximing	11 January 1993 (aged 22)			(Portuguese Football Federation) Gondomar
6	MF	Chen Zhechao	19 April 1995 (aged 20)			(Portuguese Football Federation) Sacavenense
7	MF	**Wang Shangyuan**	2 June 1993 (aged 21)			(Chinese Football Association) Guangzhou Evergrande
8	MF	Guo Yi	29 January 1993 (aged 22)			(Portuguese Football Federation) Gondomar
9	FW	**Yang Chaosheng**	22 July 1993 (aged 21)			(Chinese Football Association) Liaoning Whowin
10	FW	Chen Hao	28 January 1993 (aged 22)			(Chinese Football Association) Shanghai Shenxin
11	FW	**Wu Xinghan**	24 February 1993 (aged 22)			(Chinese Football Association) Shandong Luneng
12	GK	Yerjet Yerzat	4 January 1993 (aged 22)			(Portuguese Football Federation) Gondomar
13	DF	Cao Haiqing	28 September 1993 (aged 21)			(Chinese Football Association) Hangzhou Greentown
14	FW	**Wei Shihao**	8 April 1995 (aged 20)			(Portuguese Football Federation) Boavista
15	MF	Wang Peng	24 January 1993 (aged 22)			(Chinese Football Association) Shijiazhuang Ever Bright
17	DF	Zhao Xuebin	12 January 1993 (aged 22)			(Chinese Football Association) Dalian Aerbin
18	MF	Zang Yifeng	15 October 1993 (aged 21)			(Chinese Football Association) Hangzhou Greentown
19	MF	Wang Rui	24 April 1993 (aged 22)			(Chinese Football Association) Guangzhou Evergrande
20	MF	**Li Yuanyi**	28 August 1993 (aged 21)			(Portuguese Football Federation) Leixões
23	FW	Chang Feiya	3 February 1993 (aged 22)			(Chinese Football Association) Guangzhou R&F

=== England ===
Coach: Aidy Boothroyd

No.	Pos.	Player	Date of birth (age)	Caps	Club
1	GK	Christian Walton	9 November 1995 (aged 19)		(England) Brighton & Hove Albion
13	GK	**Jordan Pickford**	7 March 1994 (aged 21)		(England) Sunderland
2	DF	Dominic Iorfa	8 July 1995 (aged 19)		(England) Wolverhampton Wanderers
3	DF	Moses Odubajo	28 July 1993 (aged 21)		(England) Brentford
6	DF	Baily Cargill	13 October 1995 (aged 19)		(England) AFC Bournemouth
15	DF	Kortney Hause	16 July 1995 (aged 19)		(England) Wolverhampton Wanderers
12	DF	**Isaac Hayden**	22 March 1995 (aged 20)		(England) Arsenal
5	DF	Jack Stephens	27 January 1994 (aged 21)		(England) Southampton
18	DF	Jamie Hanson	10 November 1995 (aged 19)		(England) Derby County
4	MF	Harrison Reed	27 January 1995 (aged 20)		(England) Southampton
8	MF	Lewis Baker	25 April 1995 (aged 20)		(England) Chelsea
7	MF	Matt Grimes	15 July 1995 (aged 19)		(England) Swansea City
20	MF	Duncan Watmore	8 March 1994 (aged 21)		(England) Sunderland
17	MF	John Swift	23 June 1995 (aged 19)		(England) Chelsea
14	FW	**Demarai Gray**	28 June 1996 (aged 18)		(England) Birmingham City
9	FW	James Wilson	1 December 1995 (aged 19)		(England) Manchester United
16	FW	**Callum Robinson**	2 February 1995 (aged 20)		(England) Aston Villa
10	FW	Chuba Akpom	9 October 1995 (aged 19)		(England) Arsenal
11	FW	**Rolando Aarons**	16 November 1995 (aged 19)		(England) Newcastle United
19	FW	**Kwame Thomas**	28 September 1995 (aged 19)		(England) Derby County

=== Ivory Coast ===
Coach: Ibrahima Camara

No.	Pos.	Player	Date of birth (age)	Caps	Goals	Club
1	GK	Axel Kacou	1 August 1995 (aged 19)			(French Football Federation) Saint-Étienne
2	MF	**Jean-Eudes Aholou**	20 March 1994 (aged 21)			(French Football Federation) Lille
3	DF	**Souleyman Doumbia**	24 September 1996 (aged 18)			(French Football Federation) Paris Saint-Germain
4	MF	Jimmy Tchaoule	19 October 1997 (aged 17)			(Italian Football Federation) Internazionale
5	FW	**Vakoun Issouf Bayo**	10 January 1997 (aged 18)			(Ivorian Football Federation) Stade d'Abidjan
6	DF	**Ismaël Diallo**	29 January 1997 (aged 18)			(French Football Federation) Bastia
7	FW	**Roger Assalé**	13 November 1993 (aged 21)			(Congolese Association Football Federation) Mazembe
8	FW	**Guillaume Nicaise Daho**	20 December 1994 (aged 20)			(Ivorian Football Federation) Africa Sports
9	FW	Chris Bedia	5 March 1996 (aged 19)			(French Football Federation) Tours
10	FW	Abdul Manfouss Kone	1 January 1998 (aged 17)			(Ivorian Football Federation) Tanda
11	FW	**Yakou Méïte**	11 February 1996 (aged 19)			(French Football Federation) Paris Saint-Germain
12	DF	**Dagou Willie Britto**	15 December 1996 (aged 18)			(Ivorian Football Federation) Asi Abengourou
13	FW	Degbole Anderson Niangbo	6 October 1999 (aged 15)			(Ivorian Football Federation) Académie FAD
14	DF	**Shérif Olatundé Jimoh**	4 May 1996 (aged 19)			(Ivorian Football Federation) Athlétic d'Adjamé
15	DF	**Ousmane Adama Outtara**	22 December 1993 (aged 21)			(Ivorian Football Federation) Amrkhames
16	GK	Drissa Bamba	10 December 1993 (aged 21)			(Ivorian Football Federation) Stade d'Abidjan
17	MF	**Ibrahim Sangaré**	2 December 1997 (aged 17)			(Ivorian Football Federation) Denguélé
18	FW	Gbagbo Junior Magbi	14 December 1993 (aged 21)			(Ivorian Football Federation) Tanda
19	MF	**Habib Maïga**	1 January 1996 (aged 19)			(French Football Federation) Saint-Étienne
20	MF	**Franck Kessié**	19 December 1996 (aged 18)			(Italian Football Federation) Atalanta

=== Mexico ===
Coach: Mexico Raúl Gutiérrez

No.	Pos.	Player	Date of birth (age)	Caps	Club
1	GK	**Gibran Lajud**	25 December 1993 (aged 21)		(Mexico) Tijuana
2	DF	Carlos Guzmán	19 May 1994 (aged 21)		(Mexico) Morelia
3	DF	Luis López	25 August 1993 (aged 21)		(Mexico) Monterrey
4	DF	**Jordan Silva**	30 July 1994 (aged 20)		(Mexico) Toluca
5	DF	Bernardo Hernández	10 June 1993 (aged 21)		(Mexico) Monterrey
6	DF	**Josecarlos Van Rankin**	14 May 1993 (aged 22)		(Mexico) UNAM
7	MF	Jonathan Espericueta	9 August 1994 (aged 20)		(Mexico) UANL
8	MF	Uvaldo Luna	21 February 1993 (aged 22)		(Mexico) UANL
9	FW	**Marco Bueno**	31 March 1994 (aged 21)		(Mexico) Toluca
10	FW	**Ángel Zaldívar**	8 February 1994 (aged 21)		(Mexico) Tepic
11	MF	Carlos Cisneros	30 August 1993 (aged 21)		(Mexico) Tepic
12	GK	Luis Cárdenas	15 September 1993 (aged 21)		(Mexico) Monterrey
13	DF	Luis Solorio	1 August 1994 (aged 20)		(Mexico) Tepic
14	MF	Kevin Escamilla	21 February 1994 (aged 21)		(Mexico) UNAM
15	MF	Pedro Hernández	27 August 1993 (aged 21)		(Mexico) Tijuana
16	MF	Michael Pérez	14 February 1993 (aged 22)		(Mexico) Tepic
17	MF	Daniel Hernández	16 February 1994 (aged 21)		(Mexico) Atlante
18	MF	Armando Zamorano	3 October 1993 (aged 21)		(Mexico) Morelia
19	FW	Martín Zúñiga	14 April 1993 (aged 22)		(Mexico) América
20	MF	Alfonso Tamay	13 May 1993 (aged 22)		(Mexico) Puebla

=== Morocco ===
Coach:Hassan Benabicha

No.	Pos.	Player	Date of birth (age)	Caps	Club
1	GK	Badreddine Benachour	8 September 1994 (aged 20)		(Morocco) Wydad Casablanca
12	GK	**Ahmed Reda Tagnaouti**	5 April 1996 (aged 19)		(Morocco) Nahdat Berkane
2	DF	Youssef Jamaaoui	29 April 1993 (aged 22)		(Morocco) Olympique Khouribga
16	DF	Mehdi Moufaddal	27 March 1994 (aged 21)		(Morocco) Chabab Rif Al Hoceima
3	DF	Saad Ait Khorsa	1 January 1994 (aged 21)		(Morocco) Olympic Safi
4	DF	**Badr Banoune**	30 September 1993 (aged 21)		(Morocco) Nahdat Berkane
15	DF	Hamza Moussadak	9 April 1994 (aged 21)		(Morocco) Youssoufia Berrechid
13	DF	**Nayef Aguerd**	30 March 1996 (aged 19)		(Morocco) Fath Union Sport
5	DF	Mohamed Saidi	10 October 1994 (aged 20)		(Morocco) Chabab Rif Al Hoceima
12	DF	Ayoub Qasmi	19 September 1993 (aged 21)		(Morocco) Wydad Casablanca
6	MF	**Anas El Asbahi**	1 January 1993 (aged 22)		(Morocco) Wydad Casablanca
14	MF	Habib Allah Dahmani	15 June 1993 (aged 21)		(Morocco) MAS Fez
10	MF	**Walid El Karti**	23 July 1994 (aged 20)		(Morocco) Wydad Casablanca
17	MF	Youssef Essaiydy	16 August 1994 (aged 20)		(Morocco) Nahdat Berkane
8	MF	**Badr Boulhroud**	14 September 1994 (aged 20)		(Morocco) Fath Union Sport
11	MF	Walid Sabbar	25 February 1996 (aged 19)		(Morocco) Raja Casablanca
7	MF	Ayman El Hassouni	22 February 1995 (aged 20)		(Morocco) Wydad Casablanca
20	MF	Soufiane Bahja	27 July 1993 (aged 21)		(Morocco) Kawkab Marrakech
19	FW	Reda Hajhouj	2 July 1994 (aged 20)		(Morocco) Wydad Casablanca
9	FW	**Achraf Bencharki**	24 September 1994 (aged 20)		(Morocco) MAS Fez
18	FW	**Adam Ennafati**	29 June 1994 (aged 20)		(Morocco) Fath Union Sport
