= Al-Oruba SC =

Al-Oruba Sports Club
- Full name: Al-Oruba Sports Club
- Founded: 1959; 66 years ago
- Dissolved: 1972
- League: Q-League

Al-Oruba Sports Club was a Qatari football club. The football club merged with Al-Nasour to form a new football club named Al-Esteqlal, now known as Qatar SC.

It was a founding member of the Q-League and it has won five consecutive Q-League titles.

== History ==
=== Early career ===
Al Oruba was founded in 1959. The idea of founding the club came from Abdulaziz bin Jassim. It was decided as the club name by the majority of football supporters due to the overwhelming number of Arab clubs with revolutionary names at the time. The club started off with just 18 players and staff members, and the first president was Jassim bin Hamad Al Thani. Initially, blue and white were the official colors of the club, and the headquarters was situated in a small 4-room house owned by Jassim bin Hamad. At a time when football was not very popular in Qatar, the club had a small group of supporters, the largest of which was the Yemeni community.

They began training on asphalt near the club headquarters, before moving to Doha Stadium. Before the Qatar Stars League unofficially launched in 1963, they only participated in friendly matches. During the initial years of the league, they were a dominant force, along with Al-Maref.

=== Q-League era ===
In the 1966–67, Al-Oruba won its first Q-League title. They went on to win 5 consecutive league titles. In the 1971–72 Q-League, Al-Oruba lost its winning streak.

=== Merger with Al-Nasour ===
In 1972, Al-Oruba merged with Al-Nasour to form a new football club named Al-Esteqlal, now known as Qatar SC.

== Achievements ==
- Q-League
  - Champions (5): 1966–67, 1967–68, 1968–69, 1969–70, 1970–71
