= Awad Hassan Bujaloof =

Qatari footballer

Awad Bujaloof
Personal information
- Full name: Awad Hassan Bujaloof
- Date of birth: Unknown
- Place of birth: Doha, Qatar
- Position: Striker

Youth career
- 1961–1964: Al Oruba

Senior career*
Years	Team	Apps	(Gls)
1964–1980	Al-Esteqlal		

International career
1967–1977	Qatar	??	(??)
- * Club domestic league appearances and goals

Awad Hassan Bujaloof (Arabic: عوض حسن بوجلوف), is a former Qatari football footballer who played for Al-Esteqlal and represented the Qatar national team in the early 1970s.

== Club career ==
In 1961, Bujaloof began his football journey by joining the youth ranks of Al-Oruba, now known as Qatar SC. He rose to prominence in 1972 when he became the official league's first top goal-scorer with ten goals, cementing his reputation as a prolific striker. With his scoring prowess, he would help Al-Esteqlal win the Qatari League several times.

He also made significant contributions in domestic cup competitions, scoring in the finals of the 1973–74 and 1975–76 Emir Cup. After a long and loyal career with Al-Esteqlal, Bujaloof retired from club football in 1980.

== International career ==
Bujaloof represented the Qatar national team from 1967 till 1977, participating in the 1970, 1972, 1974, editions of the Arabian Gulf Cup. In the 1972 Gulf Cup, he also scored in an annulled match against Bahrain during the 1972 Gulf Cup.

== Personal life ==
Bujaloof's son, Ali Awad Bujaloof, who plays for Al-Khor.

== Honours ==
Al-Oruba

- Qatari League:
  - Winners (7): 1966-67, 1967-68, 1968-69, 1969-70, 1970-71, 1972–73, 1976–77
- Emir Cup:
  - Winners (8): 1966–67, 1967–68, 1968–69, 1969–70, 1970–71, 1971–72, 1973–74, 1975–76
