= Abdullah Mubarak =

Qatari football player and manager

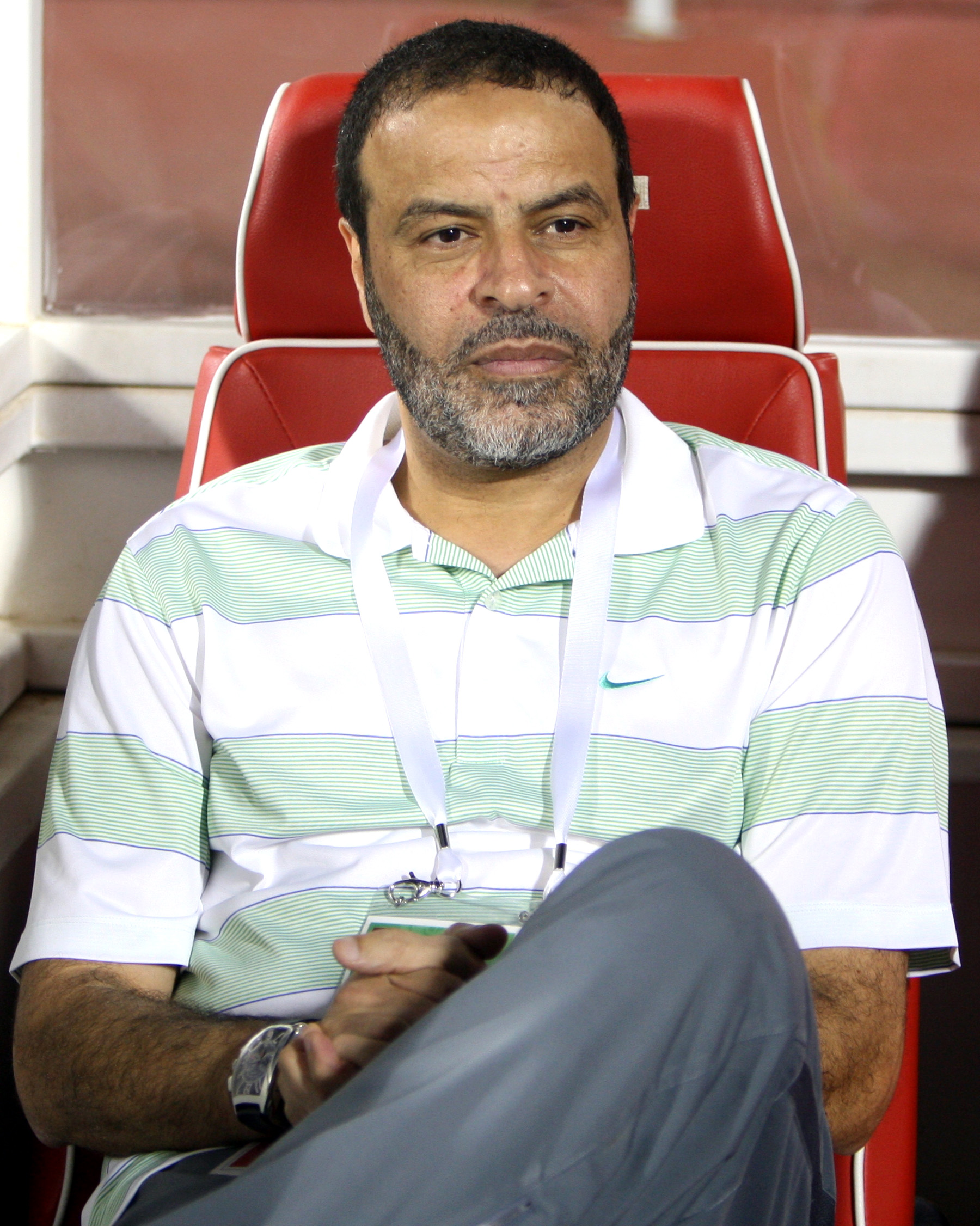
- Mubarak in September 2011

Personal information
- Full name: Abdullah Mubarak Al Eidan
- Date of birth: 5 August 1962 (age 64)
- Place of birth: Qatar
- Position: Defender

Team information
- Current team: Al-Khor (head coach)

Senior career*
Years	Team	Apps	(Gls)
- Al-Ahli

Managerial career
- 2009: Al-Ahli
- 2009–2010: Lekhwiya
- 2010–2011: Al Ahli
- 2013: Al Sailiya
- 2017: Qatar SC
- 2017–2018: Qatar SC
- 2021–2023: Al-Markhiya
- * Club domestic league appearances and goals

Abdullah Mubarak is a Qatari former football player and current manager. who is the currently head coach of Al-Khor. He received his coaching license in 1995. He had previously managed Al Ahli, and after being unattached for a year, was chosen as the head coach of Al Sailiya in January 2013. He works part-time as a sports analyst for Al Jazeera.

He was selected as the best manager in the Qatar Stars League in the 2010/11 season by the QFA after saving Al Ahli from relegation.

== Career ==
In 2009, he led Al Ahli from the Qatari Second Division to the first division, the Qatar Stars League. After taking charge at Lekhwiya the same year, he won the Second Division Cup, in addition to winning the club promotion to the first division the following season with a nearly perfect record.

Mubarak once again became Al Ahli's head coach on 26 September 2010, after Ilija Petkovic was sacked. He succeeded in steering his team away from the relegation zone that season. He asked Al Ahli's officials for permission to leave the club on 17 October 2011, after a poor result to Al Rayyan, despite support from the president and board of directors. He stated that he felt the team was not united, and that there was a "state of mistrust" between the players and the coaching staff. He officially resigned on 23 October, and Frenchman Bernard Simondi replaced him, though he could not save the club from relegation.

After his spell at Al Ahli, he went to Europe to gain coaching experience with clubs such including Bayern Munich, Barcelona, Ajax and PSV Eindhoven.

He was named as Al Sailiya's new head coach on 31 January 2013, after negotiations had begun a month prior.

== Honors ==
=== Managerial ===
Al Ahli

- Qatari Second Division runners-up: 2008–09

Lekhwiya

- Qatari Second Division winners: 2009–10
- Second Division Cup winners: 2009–10
