= Gonzalo Gutiérrez =

Gonzalo Gutiérrez may refer to:

- Gonzalo Gutiérrez (footballer, born 1981), Uruguayan forward
- Gonzalo Gutiérrez (footballer, born 2003), Argentine midfielder
