= Yacine Lafrid =

Qatari footballer (born 2000)

Personal information
- Date of birth: 10 June 2000 (age 26)
- Place of birth: Qatar
- Height: 1.80 m (5 ft 11 in)
- Position: Left-back

Team information
- Current team: Qatar SC
- Number: 42

Youth career
- Al-Duhail

Senior career*
| Years | Team | Apps | (Gls) |
| 2018–2022 | Al-Duhail | 7 | (1) |
| 2020–2022 | → Al-Wakrah (loan) | 30 | (1) |
| 2022 | Al-Wakrah | 2 | (0) |
| 2023 | Al-Shamal | 7 | (0) |
| 2023–2025 | Al-Ahli | 19 | (0) |
| 2025 | → Al-Khor (loan) | 2 | (0) |
| 2025–2026 | Lusail | 13 | (0) |
| 2026– | Qatar SC | 3 | (0) |

International career^{‡}
| 2021–2022 | Qatar U23 | 2 | (0) |
- * Club domestic league appearances and goals as of October 2026 ‡ National team caps and goals as of 2022

Yacine Lafrid (ياسين لفريد; born 10 June 2000), also spelled Yaseen Lafrid, is a Qatari professional footballer who plays as a left-back for Qatar Stars League club Qatar SC.

== Club career ==
=== Early career and Al-Wakrah ===
Lafrid began his youth development with Al-Duhail before breaking into the senior squad in 2018. Seeking regular first-team minutes, he joined Al-Wakrah on loan in December 2020. Across two seasons on loan, he established himself as a regular rotation defender, making 30 league appearances and scoring one goal before completing a permanent move to Al-Wakrah in mid-2022.

=== Al-Shamal, Al-Ahli, and Al-Khor ===
In January 2023, Lafrid signed with Al-Shamal on a free transfer, making seven league appearances during the remainder of the 2022–23 campaign. Ahead of the 2023–24 season, he moved to Al-Ahli, where he featured in 19 league matches over a year and a half. In January 2025, he was loaned out to Al-Khor for the second half of the 2024–25 season.

=== Lusail and Qatar SC ===
Following the expiration of his contract with Al-Ahli, Lafrid dropped down to the Qatari Second Division to join Lusail SC in August 2025, making 13 appearances during the 2025–26 season. On 12 August 2026, he returned to the top flight by signing a free transfer with Qatar SC ahead of the 2026–27 Qatar Stars League season.

== International career ==
Eligible to represent Qatar and Algeria, Lafrid represented Qatar at the under-23 level between 2021 and 2022.

== Career statistics ==
=== Club ===
As of October 2026

Appearances and goals by club, season and competition
| Club | Season | League | | | National cup | | Total | |
| Club | Season | Division | Apps | Goals | Apps | Goals | Apps | Goals |
|---|---|---|---|---|---|---|---|---|
| Al-Wakrah | 2020–21 | Qatar Stars League | 8 | 0 | — | — | 8 | 0 |
| Al-Wakrah | 2021–22 | Qatar Stars League | 13 | 0 | — | — | 13 | 0 |
| Al-Wakrah | 2022–23 | Qatar Stars League | 2 | 0 | — | — | 2 | 0 |
| Al-Shamal | 2022–23 | Qatar Stars League | 7 | 0 | — | — | 7 | 0 |
| Al-Ahli | 2023–24 | Qatar Stars League | 15 | 0 | — | — | 15 | 0 |
| Al-Ahli | 2024–25 | Qatar Stars League | 1 | 0 | — | — | 1 | 0 |
| Al-Khor | 2024–25 | Qatar Stars League | 2 | 0 | — | — | 2 | 0 |
| Lusail | 2025–26 | Qatari Second Division | 13 | 0 | — | — | 13 | 0 |
| Qatar SC | 2026–27 | Qatar Stars League | 3 | 0 | — | — | 3 | 0 |
| Career total | | | 64 | 0 | 0 | 0 | 64 | 0 |
