= Yousef Al-Kubaisi =

Qatari footballer (born 1993)

Yousef Al-Kubaisi يوسف الكبيسي
Personal information
- Full name: Yousef Mohammed Khaled Al-Kubaisi
- Date of birth: 16 March 1993 (age 33)
- Place of birth: Qatar
- Position: Forward

Youth career
- Qatar

Senior career*
Years	Team	Apps	(Gls)
2012–2019	Qatar	31	(4)
- * Club domestic league appearances and goals

Yousef Al-Kubaisi (Arabic:يوسف الكبيسي) (born 16 March 1993) is a Qatari footballer who plays as a forward.

== Career ==
Al-Kubaisi started his career at Qatar SC and is a product of the Qatar's youth system. On 22 December 2012, Al-Kubaisi made his professional debut for Qatar SC against Al-Rayyan in the Pro League, replacing Mohammed Razak. He landed with Qatar SC from the Qatar Stars League to the Qatari Second Division in the 2015-16 season. And ent up with Qatar SC from the Qatari Second Division to the Qatar Stars League in the 2016-17 season.
