= Nasser Khalfan =

Qatari footballer (born 1993)

Personal information
- Full name: Nasser Saleh Khalfan
- Date of birth: 17 October 1993 (age 33)
- Place of birth: Qatar
- Position: Winger

Youth career
- Al-Arabi

Senior career*
Years	Team	Apps	(Gls)
2011–2013	Al-Arabi	6	(1)
2013–2018	Al-Duhail	10	(1)
2015–2016	→ Umm Salal (loan)	24	(1)
2018–2024	Al-Ahli	55	(2)
- * Club domestic league appearances and goals

Nasser Khalfan (Arabic: ناصر خلفان; born 17 October 1993) is a Qatari footballer. He currently plays as a winger.
