= 2005–06 Qatari Second Division =

27th season of top-tier Qatari football

Qatari Second Division
- Season: 2005–06

Statistics of Qatari Second Division for the 2005–06 season.

== Overview ==
It was contested by 6 teams, and Umm Salal won the championship and promotion to the Qatar Stars League.

== League standings ==
Pos	Team	Pld	W	D	L	GF	GA	GD	Pts
1	Umm Salal	15	12	3	0	34	8	+26	27
2	Al Markhiya	15	7	3	5	29	23	+6	17
3	Mesaimeer	15	6	4	5	26	28	−2	16
4	Al Kharaitiyat	15	4	4	7	19	24	−5	12
5	Al Shahaniya	15	4	1	10	21	39	−18	9
6	Muaither	15	3	3	9	16	23	−7	9
