= Navid Dorzadeh =

Iranian footballer (born 2000)

Personal information
- Full name: Navid Dorzadeh
- Date of birth: 10 August 2000 (age 26)
- Place of birth: Nikshahr, Iran
- Height: 1.75 m (5 ft 9 in)
- Position: Forward

Team information
- Current team: Al-Ahli
- Number: 32

Youth career
- –2019: Al-Ahli

Senior career*
| Years | Team | Apps | (Gls) |
| 2019– | Al-Ahli | 37 | (0) |
| 2025–2026 | → Al-Markhiya (loan) | 3 | (0) |
- * Club domestic league appearances and goals as of 16:28, 27 July 2020 (UTC) ‡ National team caps and goals as of 16:28, 27 July 2020 (UTC)

Navid Dorzadeh (born 10 February 2000) is an Iranian professional footballer who plays as a forward for Al-Ahli.

== Career ==
Dorzadeh started his career at Al-Ahli. is constantly playing with the Al-Ahli U23, On 26 July 2020, Dorzadeh made his professional debut for Al-Ahli against Al-Shahania in the Pro League, replacing John Benson.

== Career statistics ==
=== Club ===
As of 27 July 2020.

| Club | Season | League | | | Cup | | Continental | | Other | | Total | |
| Club | Season | Division | Apps | Goals | Apps | Goals | Apps | Goals | Apps | Goals | Apps | Goals |
|---|---|---|---|---|---|---|---|---|---|---|---|---|
| Al-Ahli | 2019–20 | Qatar Stars League | 3 | 0 | 4 | 0 | 0 | 0 | 0 | 0 | 7 | 0 |
| Career total | | | 3 | 0 | 4 | 0 | 0 | 0 | 0 | 0 | 7 | 0 |
