= Raoul Danzabe =

Cameroonian association football player (born 2004)

Personal information
- Full name: Raoul Danzabe Sanda
- Date of birth: 18 July 2004 (age 22)
- Place of birth: Yaoundé
- Height: 1.66 m (5 ft 5 1/2 in)
- Position: Midfielder

Team information
- Current team: Qatar SC
- Number: 5

Youth career
- –2023: AS Fortuna

Senior career*
Years	Team	Apps	(Gls)
2022-	Qatar SC	66	(3)
- * Club domestic league appearances and goals as of 00:15 (UTC) 26 May 2026

Raoul Danzabe Sanda (born 18 July 2004) is a Cameroonian footballer who plays as a midfielder for Qatar SC in the Qatari Stars League.

== Club career ==
He played for AS Fortuna in Cameroon before signing for Qatar SC in January 2023. He scored for Qatar SC in a 4–2 win over Al Ahli in October 2023. Playing for Qatar SC he reached the final of the 2024 Emir Cup.

== International career ==
In May 2024, he was called up to the senior Cameroon national football team for the first time, ahead of their 2026 World Cup qualifying matches against Cape Verde and Angola in June 2024.
