= Ali Bujaloof =

Qatari footballer (born 1995)

Personal information
- Full name: Ali Awad Hassan Bujaloof
- Date of birth: 27 April 1995 (age 31)
- Place of birth: Qatar
- Position: Winger

Team information
- Current team: Al-Khor (on loan from Qatar)
- Number: 10

Youth career
- Qatar

Senior career*
Years	Team	Apps	(Gls)
2014–	Qatar	137	(8)
2021	→ Al-Wakrah (loan)	7	(0)
2021–2022	→ Al-Shamal (loan)	13	(0)
2025–	→ Al-Khor (loan)	0	(0)

International career
2015	Qatar U23	4	(0)
2018	Qatar	2	(0)
- * Club domestic league appearances and goals

Ali Awad Bujaloof (Arabic:علي عوض بو جلوف) (born 27 April 1995) is a Qatari footballer who plays for Al-Khor, on loan from Qatar. His father, Awad Hassan Bujaloof , was a notable Qatari player between 1966 and 1977.
