= Qatar Stars League 3 =

Third tier of football in Qatar

- Founded: 2026; 0 years ago
- Country: Qatar
- Confederation: AFC
- Number of clubs: 12
- Level on pyramid: 3
- Website: qfa.qa

Qatar Stars League 3 (QSL 3, Arabic: دوري QSL 3) is the third tier of the Qatari football league system, below the Qatar Stars League and Qatar Stars League 2. The Executive Office of the Qatar Football Association approved its establishment in July 2026. The association created the competition to widen the base of competition and give more players and clubs the chance to play.

== Format ==
The first season, 2026–27, has 12 teams. Seven are reserve ("B") teams of clubs from the top divisions, four are lower-division and local clubs, and the twelfth is the Qatar national under-20 football team. The first round is scheduled for 9 October 2026, and the first half of the season runs for six weeks until 30 November 2026.
