= 1972–73 Qatar Stars League =

10th season of top-tier football league in Qatar

Qatar Stars League
- Season: 1972–73

Statistics of Qatar Stars League for the 1972–73 season.

== Overview ==
Al-Esteqlal won the championship.

== Top scorers ==
Scorer	Club	Goals
(Qatar) Awad Hassan	Al-Esteqlal	10
