= Kwame Thomas =

English footballer (born 1995)

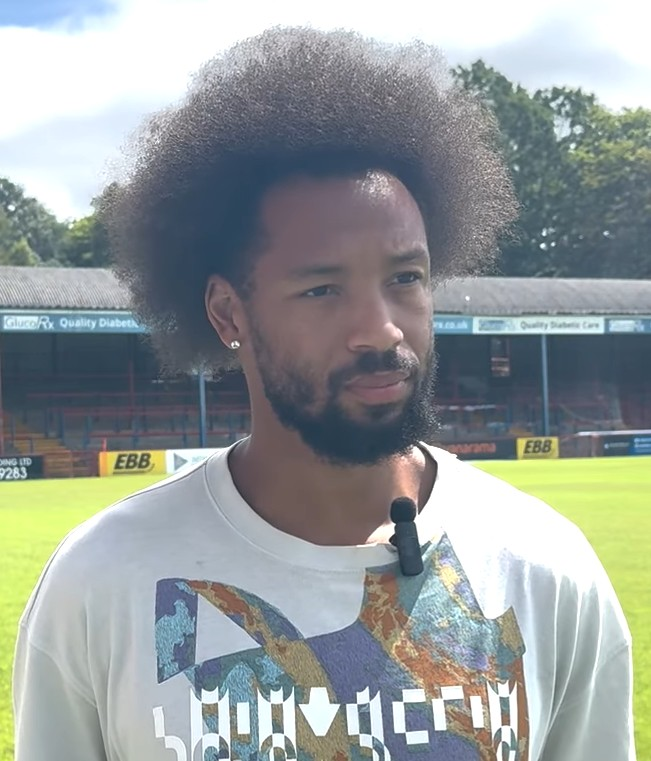
- Thomas in June 2025

Personal information
- Full name: Kwame Blair Thomas
- Date of birth: 28 September 1995 (age 31)
- Place of birth: Nottingham, England
- Height: 6 ft 3 in (1.91 m)
- Position: Forward

Team information
- Current team: King's Lynn Town
- Number: 39

Youth career
- 2012–2014: Derby County

Senior career*
Years	Team	Apps	(Gls)
2014–2016	Derby County	4	(0)
2015	→ Notts County (loan)	5	(0)
2015	→ Blackpool (loan)	18	(0)
2016–2018	Coventry City	14	(3)
2017	→ Sutton United (loan)	4	(0)
2017–2018	→ Solihull Moors (loan)	25	(4)
2018–2019	Solihull Moors	14	(0)
2019	→ Kidderminster Harriers (loan)	5	(0)
2019–2020	Doncaster Rovers	10	(3)
2020	Burton Albion	2	(0)
2020–2022	Wrexham	35	(9)
2022–2023	Sutton United	11	(0)
2023	→ Dundee (loan)	12	(3)
2023–2024	Aldershot Town	42	(6)
2024–2025	Ebbsfleet United	28	(2)
2025	→ Aldershot Town (loan)	8	(1)
2025–2026	Aldershot Town	36	(7)
2026–	King's Lynn Town	6	(1)

International career^{‡}
2011	England U16	1	(2)
2011	England U17	4	(1)
2014–2015	England U20	9	(2)
2024–	Saint Kitts and Nevis	1	(0)
- * Club domestic league appearances and goals as of 31 August 2026 ‡ National team caps and goals as of 24 March 2024

Kwame Blair Thomas (born 28 September 1995) is a professional footballer who plays as a striker for National League North club King's Lynn Town. Born in England, he represents the Saint Kitts and Nevis national football team.

A tall and physical player, he represented England at under-16, under-17 and under-20 level and was part of England's Under-20 Four Nations Tournament success in October 2014. At club level he came through the Derby County Academy to make his professional debut in the Championship in November 2014. He spent time on loan at Notts County and Blackpool, before leaving Derby for Coventry City in July 2016. He spent the first half of the 2016–17 season injured and Coventry went on to be relegated out of League One. He spent the next season on loan at National League sides Sutton United and Solihull Moors, before he was allowed to join Solihull on a permanent basis in February 2018. He was released by the Moors at the end of the 2018–19 campaign, following a brief loan spell at Kidderminster Harriers.

Since 2019, Thomas has permanently signed and played for Doncaster Rovers, Burton Albion, Wrexham, Sutton United, Aldershot Town (two spells) and Ebbsfleet United, as well as loans with Scottish club Dundee and another spell with Aldershot.

== Club career ==
=== Derby County ===
Having made progress through Derby County academy following his two years as a scholar, Thomas signed his first professional contract in the summer of 2014, just months after receiving the club's Under-21s Player of the Year award. On 29 November 2014, Thomas made his debut as a 66th-minute substitute in a Championship defeat to Leeds United, missing a good chance to score with ten minutes left to play. On 12 January 2015, Thomas joined League One club Notts County on a one-month youth loan. On 20 January, he was sent off for a second bookable offence in a 0–0 draw at Doncaster Rovers after showing a delayed response to being substituted – "Magpies" manager Shaun Derry was also dismissed for protesting the decision; assistant manager Greg Abbott theorised that referee Richard Clark had not realised Thomas had already been booked when he initially showed the yellow card. He made his return to Derby after one month at Meadow Lane as "Rams" striker Chris Martin was injured and manager Steve McClaren needed cover up front.

On 29 July 2015, Thomas joined League One side Blackpool on a six-month loan deal. He made 22 appearances for the "Tangerines", which included six starts. He was recalled early from his loan in November, much to "Pool" manager Neil McDonald's disappointment, despite Thomas's failure to score at Bloomfield Road. Back with Derby he helped Rory Delap's under-21 side to win the 2015–16 Professional Development League 2 title, but left Pride Park after he was released in the summer.

=== Coventry City ===
On 1 July 2016, Thomas signed a two-year contract with Coventry City. Manager Tony Mowbray said that "he has a lot of assets and it's a question of moulding him in the right way because I think he's got the potential to be a really good footballer". However he was hit with an abdominal injury five minutes into his second substitute appearance for the "Sky Blues" and spent the next six months in recovery. He marked his recovery with his first goal for Russell Slade's side in a 3–2 defeat at Oldham Athletic on 11 February. Seven days later he proved to be a "revelation" after helping Coventry to record their first win in 16 games, as he and namesake George Thomas shared City's two goals in a 2–1 victory over Gillingham at the Ricoh Arena. He ended the 2016–17 season with three goals in 14 games as Coventry were relegated out of League One.

Having struggled again with injury problems in the 2017–18 pre-season, he found himself low down on new manager Mark Robins's pecking order following the arrivals of Duckens Nazon and Tony Andreu, and was limited to a single start in the EFL Trophy. Robins said that "he has got to go out and try to get some football because his history at the moment is he hasn't played enough games and he breaks down with injuries". On 8 September, he joined National League side Sutton United on a one-month loan deal. However the loan spell at Gander Green Lane was described as a "disappointing" one as he was limited to just two league starts, featuring in the full 90 minutes only once.

=== Solihull Moors ===
Thomas returned to the National League on a one-month loan at Solihull Moors on 17 November 2017. He scored on his Moors debut on 18 November, to salvage a 1–1 draw at Maidstone United in Mark Yates's first game as manager; assistant manager Tim Flowers said that Thomas was "unplayable" and well worthy of his one-yard tap-in goal. The loan deal was extended by a further month on 5 January. He left Coventry after his contract was terminated by mutual consent on 1 February 2018. He made an immediate return to Damson Park and ended the 2017–18 campaign with four goals in 27 appearances for Solihull.

He failed to score in 19 matches throughout the 2018–19 campaign and was sent off during a 5–0 win over Bromley on 22 September. On 15 March, he joined National League North side Kidderminster Harriers on loan. He started one game for the Harriers, making four further substitute appearances, before being recalled early from his loan spell at Aggborough by Solihull manager Tim Flowers. He left the club upon the expiry of his contract in the summer.

=== Doncaster Rovers ===
After having trials at Port Vale and Carlisle United in July 2019, Thomas was signed by Doncaster Rovers on 4 October 2019 on a short-term contract till January 2020. On 22 October 2019 he scored his first two goals for the club in a 1–7 win over Southend.

=== Burton Albion ===
On 4 February 2020, Thomas signed for Burton Albion on a six-month deal.

=== Wrexham ===
Kwame signed for Wrexham on 29 August 2020 on a one-year deal. After a ruptured achilles injury ended his 2020/2021 season, he was retained by Wrexham who stood by Thomas with another one-year deal. He returned in mid-December 2021, scoring on his return.

=== Sutton United ===
On 1 July 2022, Thomas joined League Two club Sutton United following his release from Wrexham, returning to the club having played four matches on loan in 2017.

He was released by Sutton at the end of the 2022–23 season.

==== Dundee (loan) ====
On 19 January 2023, Thomas joined Scottish Championship club Dundee on loan until the end of the season. He would make his debut for the Dark Blues coming off the bench against St Mirren in the Scottish Cup. On 17 February, Thomas suffered a potential concussion in a league game against Greenock Morton. He was able to make the line-up the following week, but would remain out for the next few weeks. Thomas made his return to the pitch on 1 April, coming off the bench and scoring his first Dundee goal in a 7–0 demolition of Hamilton Academical. Thomas would score a brace against Morton a few weeks later, including a last-minute equaliser. Thomas would come on as a substitute in Dundee's 3–5 away win over Queen's Park which clinched the side the Scottish Championship title.

=== Aldershot Town ===
On 17 July 2023, Thomas agreed to return to the National League and join Aldershot Town signing a one-year deal. On 28 August, Thomas would play part of a league game away to Eastleigh as a goalkeeper after Shots goalie Jordi van Stappershoef was sent off. Thomas scored his first goal for Aldershot on 30 September, netting a late winner over Dagenham & Redbridge.

=== Ebbsfleet United ===
On 19 July 2024, Thomas joined National League club Ebbsfleet United. He made his debut from the bench in the league opener away to Gateshead. Thomas scored his first goal for the Fleet on 26 October, netting a last-minute equaliser at home against Wealdstone.

=== Aldershot Town return ===
On 27 March 2025, Thomas returned to his previous club Aldershot Town on loan for the remainder of the season. On 5 April, Thomas made his second debut for the Shots off the bench in an FA Trophy semi-final victory over rivals Woking which sent Thomas and Aldershot to Wembley Stadium for the final. On 12 April, Thomas netted the first goal of his second stint with the Shots in a heavy defeat away to York City. On 11 May, Thomas came on as a substitute in the 2025 FA Trophy final in a 3–0 win over Spennymoor Town which saw Aldershot win their first ever FA Trophy.

On 24 June 2025, Thomas returned to Aldershot Town on a permanent basis following his departure from Ebbsfleet United. On 23 August, Thomas scored the first goal of his latest Shots stint in an away league win over Solihull Moors. On 27 April 2026, it was announced that Thomas would leave the club at the end of his contract in June.

=== King's Lynn Town ===
On 24 July 2026, Thomas joined National League North club King's Lynn Town on a permanent deal.

== International career ==
Born in England, Thomas is of Kittitian and Ghanaian descent. Thomas has represented England at under-16, under-17, and under-20 levels. He scored two goals for the under-20s, in friendlies against Romania and the United States. He played in all three of England's games in the Under-20 Four Nations Tournament in October 2014, which England won after finishing ahead of Germany, Netherlands and Turkey. He was named in Aidy Boothroyd's squad for the 2015 Toulon Tournament in France and was an unused substitute up until the third-place play-off match at Stade Mayol, which he started; England finished fourth after losing 2–1 to the United States.

Thomas was called up to the Saint Kitts and Nevis national team on 21 March 2024. Thomas made his debut for the Sugar Boyz on 24 March 2024, starting in their international friendly against San Marino in Serravalle.

== Style of play ==
A powerful forward, he is a threat in the air and on the ground. Former Derby youth coach Darren Wassall described him as a "model professional". Before being released by Coventry, Academy coach Jason Farndon said that "his physicality has always been his main threat but now everyone is catching up with his physicality so he has got to reinvent himself."

== Personal life ==
Thomas grew up supporting Arsenal and idolizing Thierry Henry. He is a devout Christian. He went to school with Offrande Zanzala and the two remained good friends into adulthood.

== Career statistics ==
As of match played 31 August 2026

Appearances and goals by club, season and competition
Club	Season	League			National Cup		League Cup		Other		Total	
Club	Season	Division	Apps	Goals	Apps	Goals	Apps	Goals	Apps	Goals	Apps	Goals
Derby County	2014–15	Championship	4	0	1	0	0	0	0	0	5	0
Derby County	2015–16	Championship	0	0	0	0	0	0	0	0	0	0
Derby County	Total		4	0	1	0	0	0	0	0	5	0
Notts County (loan)	2014–15	League One	5	0	0	0	0	0	0	0	5	0
Blackpool (loan)	2015–16	League One	18	0	1	0	1	0	2 (Note: Appearances in Football League Trophy)	0	22	0
Coventry City	2016–17	League One	14	3	0	0	0	0	0	0	14	3
Coventry City	2017–18	League Two	0	0	0	0	0	0	1	0	1	0
Coventry City	Total		14	3	0	0	0	0	1	0	15	3
Sutton United (loan)	2017–18	National League	4	0	0	0	0	0	0	0	4	0
Solihull Moors	2017–18	National League	25	4	0	0	0	0	2 (Note: Appearances in FA Trophy)	0	27	4
Solihull Moors	2018–19	National League	14	0	4	0	0	0	1	0	19	0
Solihull Moors	Total		39	4	4	0	0	0	3	0	46	4
Kidderminster Harriers (loan)	2018–19	National League North	5	0	0	0	0	0	0	0	5	0
Doncaster Rovers	2019–20	League One	10	3	3	0	0	0	3	0	16	3
Burton Albion	2019–20	League One	2	0	0	0	0	0	0	0	2	0
Wrexham	2020–21	National League	29	9	1	0	—		1	0	31	9
Wrexham	2021–22	National League	6	0	0	0	0	0	2	2	8	2
Wrexham	Total		35	9	1	0	0	0	3	2	39	11
Sutton United	2022–23	League Two	11	0	0	0	1	0	1	0	13	0
Dundee (loan)	2022–23	Scottish Championship	12	3	1	0	—		2 (Note: Appearances in the Scottish Challenge Cup)	0	15	3
Aldershot Town	2023–24	National League	42	6	4	0	—		2	0	48	6
Ebbsfleet United	2024–25	National League	28	2	1	0	—		0	0	29	2
Aldershot Town (loan)	2024–25	National League	6	1	—		—		2	0	8	1
Aldershot Town	2025–26	National League	36	7	2	1	—		1	1	39	9
King's Lynn Town	2026–27	National League North	6	1	0	0	—		0	0	6	1
Career total			273	38	17	1	2	0	20	3	312	42

== Honours ==
Dundee

- Scottish Championship: 2022–23

Aldershot Town

- FA Trophy: 2024–25

England U20

- Under-20 Four Nations Tournament: October 2014
