= Satea Abdelnasser =

Qatari footballer (born 1993)

Sateh Abdelnasser
Personal information
- Full name: Sateh Abdelnasser Al-Abbasi
- Date of birth: 11 September 1993 (age 33)
- Place of birth: Syria
- Position: Goalkeeper

Team information
- Current team: Qatar
- Number: 74

Senior career*
Years	Team	Apps	(Gls)
2014–2017	Al Ahli	5	(0)
2017–2018	Qatar	1	(0)
2018–2022	Al Arabi	14	(0)
2022–	Qatar	22	(0)

International career
- Qatar U23
- * Club domestic league appearances and goals

Sateh Abdelnasser (Arabic: ساطع عبد الناصر, born 11 September 1993) is a footballer who currently plays for Qatar. Born in Syria, he has represented Qatar at youth level.
