= Al-Sailiya SC =

Association football club in Qatar

Al-Sailiya السيلية
- Full name: Al-Sailiya Sports Club
- Nicknames: The Peregrines; Al Shahwani
- Founded: 10 October 1995 (31 years ago), as Al-Qadsiyah
- Ground: Hamad bin Khalifa Stadium
- Capacity: 12,000
- Chairman: Sheikh Nasser bin Hamad bin Nasser Al Thani
- Head coach: Mirghani Al Zain
- League: Qatar Stars League
- 2025–2026: 10th
- Website: alsailiya.qa
Home colours	Away colours

Al-Sailiya Sports Club (Arabic: نادي السيلية الرياضي) is a Qatari professional football club currently competing in the Qatar Stars League. They are based in the capital Doha and play their home games at Hamad bin Khalifa Stadium.

== History ==
Al Sailiya were founded as Al-Qadsiyah Sports Club on 10 October 1995. The club won the 1998 edition of the Qatari Second Division Cup under the leadership of Iraqi coach Wamidh Munir. In 2003, the club adopted its current name, Al Sailiya.

They were relegated in 2006 after finishing at the bottom of the Qatar Stars League. They won promotion back to the Qatar Stars League for the 2007–08 season, but were once again relegated to the Qatargas League in the 2010–11 season. They won promotion again, but finished last in the Stars League that year. However, a decision to expand the QSL to 14 teams ensured Sailiya's place in the top flight was secure.

== Timeline ==
Season	Notes
1994–95	The club is founded as Qadsia Sporting Club.
1997–98	Won the Qatari Second Division Cup.
2002–03	Won promotion from the Qatargas League.
2002–03	U–19 team won the league.
2002–03	Changed name to "Al Sailiya".
2003–04	Team relegated from the Qatar Stars League.
2003–04	U–19 team won the league.
2004–05	Won the Qatari Second Division Cup.
2004–05	Won promotion from the Qatargas League.
2005–06	Team relegated from the Qatar Stars League.
2006–07	Won promotion from the Qatargas League.
2010–11	Team relegated from the Qatar Stars League.
2011–12	Won promotion from the Qatargas League.

== Statistics ==
Qatar Stars League seasons
Season	League									
Season	Division	Pos	G	W	D	L	GF	GA	GD	Pts
2003–04	QSL	10° (relegated)	18	0	4	14	20	61	−41	4
2005–06	QSL	10° (relegated)	27	5	8	14	29	47	−18	23
2007–08	QSL	8°	27	7	6	14	33	46	−13	27
2008–09	QSL	9°	27	5	5	17	31	58	−27	20
2009–10	QSL	11°	22	4	7	11	16	28	−12	19
2010–11	QSL	11° (relegated)	22	3	6	13	25	47	−22	15

== Stadium ==
Built in 1995, the Al-Sailiya Stadium covers 60,000 m^{2} and features a football pitches with a capacity for 1,500 people, two training pitches, locker rooms, an administrative office and other administrative buildings. However, due to its insufficient capacity and facilities, the club frequently uses Hamad bin Khalifa Stadium as its homegrounds.

== Players ==
As of Qatar Stars League:

Note: Flags indicate national team as defined under FIFA eligibility rules; some limited exceptions apply. Players may hold more than one non-FIFA nationality.

No.	Pos.	Nation	Player
1	GK	ARG	Bautista Burke
2	DF	QAT	Abdulla Mahmoud
4	DF	QAT	Ibrahim Majid
5	MF	QAT	Abdulrahman Mohamed
6	MF	JOR	Moataz Bostami
7	MF	EGY	Mohab Mohammed
8	MF	QAT	Ahmed Moein
9	FW	JOR	Ali Olwan
10	MF	NED	Mohamed Taabouni
11	FW	QAT	Hadi Tabasideh
13	FW	ESP	Joselu
14	DF	QAT	Abdelaziz Mitwali
15	DF	ARG	Matías Nani (on loan from Al-Gharafa)
17	MF	NOR	Mathias Normann
18	DF	QAT	Awab El-Awad
19	FW	QAT	Abdulaziz Al-Bakri

No.	Pos.	Nation	Player
20	MF	MAR	Younès Belhanda
21	MF	NED	Anwar El Ghazi
22	MF	QAT	Andri Syahputra
25	MF	CMR	Raoul Danzabe (on loan from Qatar)
31	GK	JOR	Motasem Al Bustami
32	MF	QAT	Ali Al-Amri
33	DF	YEM	Abdulaziz Al-Omari
34	MF	QAT	Mohammed Yasser
37	MF	JOR	Yousef Anani
50	GK	EGY	Yousef Sayed
55	DF	NED	Kellian van der Kaap
67	DF	QAT	Mohammed Osman
71	DF	PLE	Musab Al-Battat
77	DF	QAT	Mouaz Abdalla
99	DF	QAT	Salem Al-Sufyani

== Notable players ==
This list includes players whom have made significant contributions to their national team and to the club. At least 100 caps for the club or 80 caps for their national team is needed to be considered for inclusion.

Local players

- (Qatar) Majdi Siddiq – 114 caps for Al-Sailiya
- (Qatar) Mirghani Al Zain – 111 caps for Al-Sailiya
- Mansour Muftah – 81 caps for Qatar

Foreign players

- (France) Grégory Gomis – 121 caps for Al-Sailiya
- Ahmed Kano – 154 caps for Oman (record)
- Faouzi Aaish – 103 caps for Bahrain
- Moumouni Dagano – 83 caps for Burkina Faso
- Wael Gomaa – 117 caps for Egypt
- Sayed Mahmood Jalal – 83 caps for Bahrain
- Karim Ansarifard – 104 caps for Iran

== Personnel ==
=== Current technical staff ===
Last update: 24 April 2023.

Coaching staff
Head coach	(Qatar) Mirghani Al Zain
Assistant coach	(Qatar) Jassim Saleh
Goalkeeping coach	(Tunisia) Hicham Jaziri
Performance analyst	(Italy) Cristoforo Filetti

== Managerial history ==
As of 24 April 2023

Seasons	Manager	Nationality
1997–98	Wamidh Munir	(Iraq)
2002–03	Saad Hafez	(Iraq)
2003	Paulo Campos	(Brazil)
2003–04	Pierre Lechantre	(France)
2004	Adnan Dirjal	(Iraq)
2004	José Paulo	(Brazil)
2004–05	Amarildo	(Brazil)
2005	Wamidh Munir	(Iraq)
2005–06	José Paulo	(Brazil)
2007	Ladislas Lozano	(France)
2007–08	José Paulo	(Brazil)
2008–09	Nebojsa Vučković	(Serbia)
2009–10	Džemal Hadžiabdić	(Bosnia and Herzegovina)
July 1, 2010–Oct 8, 2012	Uli Stielike	(Germany)
Oct 8, 2012–Feb 1, 2013	Maher Kanzari	(Tunisia)
Feb 1, 2013–June 6, 2013	Abdullah Mubarak	(Qatar)
June 6, 2013–March 2023	Sami Trabelsi	(Tunisia)
March 2023–	Mirghani Al Zain	(Qatar)

== Honours ==
- Qatari Stars Cup
  - Winners (2): 2020–21, 2021–22
- Qatar FA Cup
  - Winners (1): 2021
- Qatari Second Division
  - Winners (5): 2002–03, 2004–05, 2006–07, 2011–12, 2024–25
- Qatari Second Division Cup
  - Winners (3): 1998, 2005, 2011

== Continental record ==
Season	Competition	Round	Club	Home	Away	Aggregate
2020	AFC Champions League	Play-off round	(Iran) Shahr Khodro	0–0 (a.e.t.) (4–5 p)		
