= Henri Atamaniuk =

French footballer (born 1944)

Personal information
- Date of birth: 28 October 1944 (age 82)
- Place of birth: Freyming-Merlebach, Lorraine, France
- Height: 1.75 m (5 ft 9 in)
- Position: Midfielder

Youth career
- 1961–1962: SO Merlebach
- 1962–1963: Sochaux

Senior career*
| Years | Team | Apps | (Gls) |
| 1963–1966 | Forbach | 79 | (23) |
| 1966–1968 | Sochaux | 53 | (18) |
| 1968–1969 | Lens | 41 | (15) |
| 1969–1970 | Racing Besançon | 24 | (2) |
| 1970–1971 | Montpellier | 32 | (10) |
| 1971 | Metz | 11 | (2) |
| 1971–1974 | Poitiers FC | 84 | (36) |
| 1974–1976 | FC Bourges | 57 | (17) |
| Total | | 381 | (123) |

Managerial career
- 1976–1984: Saint-Lô
- 1984–1987: Angers
- 1987–1989: FC Sens
- 1989: FC Delta OPT Libreville
- 1989–1991: EF Bergerac
- 1991–1992: Orléans
- 1993–1996: CS Meaux
- 2003–2004: Mount Cameroon
- 2007–2011: Scavi-Rocheteau
- 2012–2013: Al-Arabi SC
- 2013–2014: Lausanne-Sport
- * Club domestic league appearances and goals

Henri Atamaniuk (born 28 October 1944) is a French football manager and former player who played as a midfielder.

== Career ==
On 8 November 2013, Atamaniuk was hired as manager of FC Lausanne-Sport by the new technical director of the club, Marco Simone.
