= Louis Souchaud =

French footballer (born 1995)

Personal information
- Full name: Louis Souchaud
- Date of birth: 10 September 1995 (age 31)
- Place of birth: Le Blanc, France
- Height: 1.82 m (6 ft 0 in)
- Position: Goalkeeper

Youth career
- 2002–2008: US Le Blanc
- 2008–2012: Châteauroux

Senior career*
Years	Team	Apps	(Gls)
2012–2018	Châteauroux	45	(0)
2018–2020	Quevilly-Rouen	58	(0)
2021–2022	Hyères	19	(0)

International career
2014–2015	France U20	5	(0)
- * Club domestic league appearances and goals as of 18:43, 18 December 2023 (UTC)

Louis Souchaud (born 10 September 1995) is a French footballer who most recently played as a goalkeeper.

== Career ==
Souchaud is a youth exponent from LB Châteauroux. He made his Ligue 2 debut on 27 February 2015 against Nîmes Olympique in a 2–1 home win.

After not featuring in the 2017–18 Ligue 2 season, Souchaud left Châteauroux and signed for US Quevilly-Rouen in Championnat National. He went on to play for the club for two seasons, but at the end of the 2019–20 season, his contract was not renewed.

== Career statistics ==
As of 28 February 2020.

Appearances and goals by club, season and competition
Club	Division	Season	League		Cup		League Cup		Total	
Club	Division	Season	Apps	Goals	Apps	Goals	Apps	Goals	Apps	Goals
Châteauroux	Ligue 2	2014–15	4	0	1	0	0	0	5	0
Châteauroux	National	2015–16	21	0	0	0	0	0	3	0
Châteauroux	National	2016–17	20	0	0	0	2	0	22	0
Châteauroux	Ligue 2	2017–18	0	0	3	0	0	0	3	0
Châteauroux	Total		45	0	4	0	2	0	51	0
Quevilly-Rouen	National	2018–19	34	0	2	0	0	0	36	0
Quevilly-Rouen	National	2019–20	24	0	2	0	1	0	27	0
Quevilly-Rouen	Total		58	0	4	0	1	0	63	0
Career totals			105	0	8	0	3	0	116	0
