= Gonzalo Gutiérrez (footballer, born 2003) =

Argentine professional footballer

Personal information
- Full name: Gonzalo Benjamin Gutiérrez
- Date of birth: 26 July 2003 (age 23)
- Place of birth: Argentina
- Position: Midfielder

Team information
- Current team: San Martín T.

Youth career
- San Martín T.

Senior career*
Years	Team	Apps	(Gls)
2020–	San Martín T.	8	(0)
- * Club domestic league appearances and goals as of 18:21, 16 August 2025 (UTC)

Gonzalo Benjamin Gutiérrez (born 26 July 2003) is an Argentine professional footballer who plays as a midfielder for San Martín.

== Career ==
Gutiérrez is a product of the San Martín youth system. He was promoted into their senior squad under joint managers Sergio Gómez and Favio Orsi in December 2020, initially appearing on the substitute's bench for a Primera B Nacional win away to Defensores de Belgrano on 6 December. Gutiérrez made his senior debut, aged seventeen, on 13 December against Atlético de Rafaela, after he replaced Facundo Melivilo nine minutes into the second half of a three-goal home defeat.

== Career statistics ==
As of 4 January 2021.

Appearances and goals by club, season and competition
Club	Season	League			Cup		League Cup		Continental		Other		Total	
Club	Season	Division	Apps	Goals	Apps	Goals	Apps	Goals	Apps	Goals	Apps	Goals	Apps	Goals
San Martín	2020	Primera B Nacional	2	0	0	0	—		—		0	0	2	0
Career total			2	0	0	0	—		—		0	0	2	0
