= Randy Chirino =

Costa Rican footballer (born 1996)

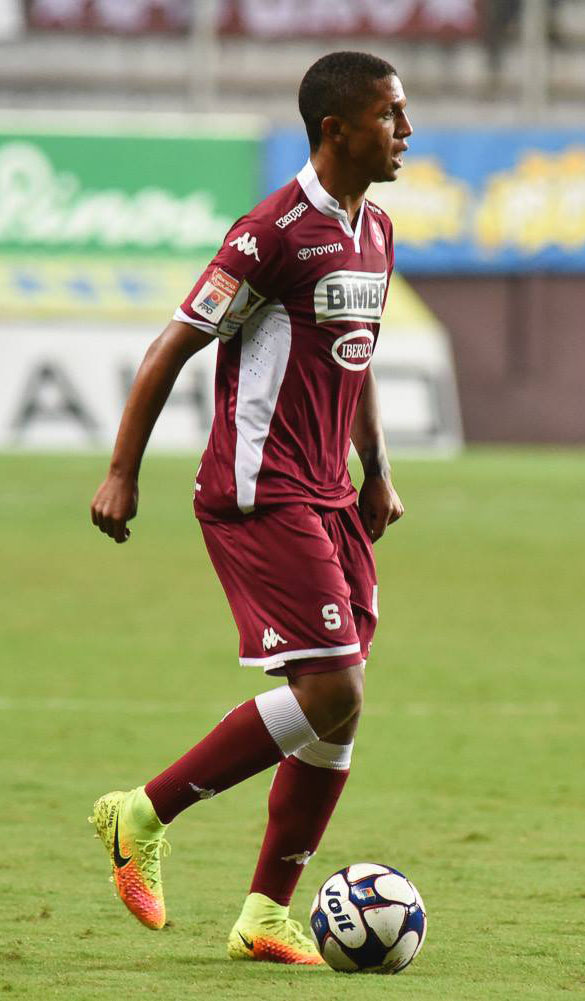
- Image of Randy Chirino

Personal information
- Full name: Randy Yormein Chirino Serrano
- Date of birth: January 16, 1996 (age 30)
- Place of birth: Quesada, Costa Rica
- Positions: Midfielder; forward

Senior career*
Years	Team	Apps	(Gls)
–2019	Deportivo Saprissa	41	(2)
2019–2020	A.D. San Carlos	23	(2)
2020–	AS Soliman	2	(0)
- * Club domestic league appearances and goals

Randy Yormein Chirino Serrano (born 16 January 1996) is a Costa Rican professional footballer.

== Career ==
From 2016 to early 2017, Chirino refused to turn up to training with Saprissa due to not playing regularly.
