= Gonzalo Gutiérrez (footballer, born 1981) =

Uruguayan footballer

Gonzalo Gutiérrez Matraca
Personal information
- Full name: Enrique Gonzalo Gutiérrez Torres
- Date of birth: 20 February 1981 (age 45)
- Place of birth: Montevideo, Uruguay
- Height: 1.73 m (5 ft 8 in)
- Position: Forward

Team information
- Current team: Bella Vista

Youth career
- 1986–1990: Sagrada Familia
- 1990–1995: Maguá FC
- 1995–2002: Danubio

Senior career*
Years	Team	Apps	(Gls)
2002–2005	Danubio	36	(5)
2002	→ Racing Club (loan)	28	(6)
2004	→ Oriente Petrolero (loan)		
2005–2006	→ Motagua (loan)		
2006	Rentistas	11	(1)
2006–2007	Fénix	8	(1)
2007–2008	Al-Markhiya Sports Club	19	(15)
2008–2010	Al-Mu'aidar Sports Club	21	(14)
2010–2011	Deportivo Maldonado	26	(15)
2011–2012	Suchitepéquez	43	(24)
2012–2014	Bella Vista	11	(1)

International career
2001	Uruguay U-20		
- * Club domestic league appearances and goals

Enrique Gonzalo Gutiérrez Torres (born February 20, 1981), nicknamed "Matraca", is a Uruguayan former football player. He currently serves as assistant coach of Al Rayyan. Gutiérrez also played in the 2001 South American Youth Championship for Uruguay.

Gutiérrez started his professional career in Uruguayan club Danubio FC. Since then he has played professional football worldwide, including countries such as Honduras and Qatar.

== Early life ==
Gutiérrez was born in the suburb of Aires Puros in Montevideo to a stay-at-home mother and a father who worked at a printing press. He had one sibling - a sister. He was baptized as a young child.

Like most children in Uruguay, Gutiérrez began his footballing career at a very young age. At the age of five, while playing football in his neighbourhood, Gutiérrez was scouted by Sagrada Familia, a football club, and was offered a chance to play for them. Afterwards, he played for Maguá FC, until he eventually ended up playing for a first division club, Danubio FC, despite interest from other clubs at the time. During this period, he converted to a striker.

== Career ==
=== Danubio ===
Gutiérrez debuted for Danubio as a back-up player in a very competitive squad, with around five strikers ahead of him. He had the choice to go to Chilean club Everton on loan, but he declined. Alternatively, he had a choice to go on loan to Racing Club de Montevideo, which his then-coach, Piazza, convinced him was the right decision. Gutiérrez was further swayed by the idea as he would finally be able to make his debut in the Uruguayan Primera División.

After returning to Danubio, who was now under the leadership of Gregorio Pérez. Gutiérrez was getting playing time as part of a squad rotation system. By the end of the season, he was regularly starting games. Having successfully integrated into the squad, Danubio went on to win the Primera División in 2004 under Manuel Keosseian.

==== Loans ====
===== Oriente Petrolero =====
Gutiérrez, now not playing as regularly for Danubio, had the chance to go on loan for Bolivian side Oriente Petrolero. This was the first time he had ever played abroad, though his tenure proved to be unsuccessful.

===== Motagua =====
Once again gaining a chance to prove himself abroad, Gutiérrez was sent on loan to one of the most successful clubs in Honduras, F.C. Motagua. He showed good performances in the Liga Nacional.

=== Rentistas ===
Upon his return to Uruguay, Gutiérrez was inexplicably cut from the Danubio squad. Without any contact from officials of the club, it was announced that he would be leaving the team, despite playing for the club for over ten years.

He then received an offer from one of the bottom clubs in the Primera División, Rentistas.

=== Fénix ===
Gutiérrez played for Segunda División side Fénix from 2006 till 2007, eventually winning the league.

=== Al-Markhiya ===
The first time he had played outside of the Americas was with Qatari 2nd Division team Al-Markhiya. He had great success with Markhiya, scoring 15 goals in 19 games to earn the top scorer award for the second division, nearly managing an average of a goal every game.

=== Al-Mu'aidar ===
After playing a season with Markhiya, he transferred to another second division club, Al-Mu'aidar Sports Club. Gutiérrez described life in Qatar as "spectacular", stating it was very quiet and safe. He once again won the top scorer before moving back to South America to be closer to his family and friends.

=== Deportivo Maldonado ===
He returned to Uruguay and played for Deportivo Maldonado, which was led by Julio Ribas. Ribas acted as a mentor for Gutiérrez, giving him advice in many aspects of the game, including coaching.

=== Bella Vista ===
Gutiérrez transferred to Bella Vista in August 2012.

== Coaching career ==
In July 2015, he was announced as the assistant coach of Qatari club Al Rayyan.

== Honours ==
=== Club ===
==== Danubio F.C. ====
- Uruguayan Primera División: 2004

==== Fénix ====
- Segunda División: 2007

=== Individual ===
==== Al-Markhiya ====
- Qatari 2nd Division Top Scorer: 2008

==== Al-Mu'aidar ====
- Qatari 2nd Division Top Scorer: 2009
