= Qatari Second Division Cup =

The Qatari Second Division Cup (Arabic: كأس الدرجة الثانية القطري) is an annual association football competition in Qatar which is played in by clubs of the Qatari Second Division.

== History ==
- 1997–98: Al Qadsiyah (champions)
- 1998–99: Al Nasr 4–3 Al Qadsiyah
- 2004–05: Al Sailiya (champions)
- 2017–18: Muaither 3–2 Al Markhiya
- 2019–20: Mesaimeer 1–0 Muaither
- 2023–24:

== Top scorers ==
- 1998–99: (Qatar) Saleh Al Rashdi (7 goals)
