= 1968–69 Qatar Stars League =

6th season of top-tier Qatari football

Qatar Stars League
- Season: 1968–69

Statistics of Qatar Stars League for the 1968–69 season.

== Overview ==
Al-Oruba won the championship.
