= 1966–67 Qatar Stars League =

4th season of top-tier Qatari football

Qatar Stars League
- Season: 1966–67

Statistics of Qatar Stars League for the 1966–67 season.

== Overview ==
Al-Oruba won the championship.
