= 1970–71 Qatar Stars League =

8th season of top-tier football league in Qatar

Qatar Stars League
- Season: 1970–71

Statistics of Qatar Stars League for the 1970–71 season.

== Overview ==
Al-Oruba won the championship.
