= 1969–70 Qatar Stars League =

7th season of top-tier football league in Qatar

Qatar Stars League
- Season: 1969–70

Statistics of Qatar Stars League for the 1969–70 season.

== Overview ==
Al-Oruba won the championship.
