= Umm Salal SC =

Association football club in Qatar

Umm-Salal SC نادي أم صلال
- Full name: Umm Salal Sport Club
- Nickname: Barzan's Falcons
- Founded: 1979; 47 years ago
- Ground: Thani bin Jassim Stadium; Al Rayyan, Qatar
- Capacity: 21,175
- Chairman: Abdulaziz bin Abdulrahman Al-Thani
- Head coach: Damir Čanadi
- League: Qatar Stars League
- 2024–25: Qatar Stars League, 11th of 12
- Website: ummsalal.qa
Home colours	Away colours	Third colours

Umm Salal Sport Club (Arabic: نادي أم صلال الرياضي) is a Qatari professional football club based in Umm Salal, that competes in the Qatar Stars League, the highest tier of Qatari football. Previously called Al-Tadamun Sport Club, Umm Salal is best known for being the first Qatari club that made it to the semi-finals of the AFC Champions League.

== History ==
Umm Salal were formed in 1979 under the name Al-Tadamun Club and entered into the Qatari Second Division along with five other clubs. After the dissolution of two other clubs in the second division, Al Tadamun was also dissolved. The club was reformed in 1996, with Sheikh Abdulaziz bin Abdulrahman Al Thani heading the club. It won the Qatari 2nd Division in their second season after reformation, in addition to lifting the league trophy two more times in 2000 and 2006.

In 2004, the club's name, Al Tadamun Club, was changed to "Umm Salal" by decision of the Qatar Olympic Committee.

They won promotion to the Qatar Stars League in the 2006–07 season. They enjoyed league success, finishing third in consecutive seasons. In 2008, they qualified for the AFC Champions League 2009 after defeating Al Gharafa 4–1 on penalties in the Emir Cup final. They were knocked out of the ACL in the semi-finals, which was the furthest any Qatari club had ever advanced at that time.

The team's nickname, Barzan's Falcons, is a reference to the Barzan Tower, which the Umm Salal Mohammed Fort houses. The tower became renowned for being used during Ramadan to ensure the holy month was observed at the correct time.

== Honours ==
- Emir of Qatar Cup
  - Winners (1): 2008
  - Runners-up (1): 2010
- Sheikh Jassem Cup
  - Winners (1): 2009
  - Runners-up (1): 2011
- Qatari Stars Cup
  - Winners (1): 2024
  - Runners-up (2): 2010, 2023
- Qatari 2nd Division
  - Winners (3): 1998, 2000, 2006

== Statistics and records ==
=== League seasons ===
Season	Div.	Pos.	Emir of Qatar Cup	Crown Prince Cup	Sheikh Jassim Cup	Asia	
2006	2D	1	1st round	–	Semi-final	–	–
2007	QSL	3	Quarter-final	Semi-final	Group stage	–	–
2008	QSL	3	Winners	Semi-final	Group stage	–	–
2009	QSL	6	2nd round	–	Winners	CL	Semi-final
2010	QSL	7	Runners-up	–	Group stage	–	–
2011	QSL	9	3rd round	–	Runners-up	–	–
2012	QSL	11	3rd round	–	Group stage	–	–
2013	QSL	5	Quarter-final	–	Group stage	–	–
2014	QSL	7	3rd round	–	–	–	–
2015	QSL	6	Quarter-final	–	–	–	–
2016	QSL	5	3rd round	–	–	–	–
2017	QSL	6	4th round	–	–	–	–
2018	QSL	5	Quarter-final	–	–	–	–
2019	QSL	9	3rd round	–	–	–	–
2020	QSL	10	Round of 16	–	–	–	–
2021	QSL	10	Round of 16	–	–	–	–
2022	QSL	6	Round of 16	–	–	–	–

=== Asian record ===
Competition	Pld	W	D	L	GF	GA
AFC Champions League	11	4	3	4	11	20
Total	11	4	3	4	11	20

- Q = Qualification
- GS = Group stage
- R16 = Round of 16
- QF = Quarter-final
- SF = Semi-final

AFC Champions League

Round	Country	Club	Home	Away
2009
GS	(United Arab Emirates)	Al Jazira	2–2	1–0
GS	(Saudi Arabia)	Al-Ittihad	1–3	0–7
GS	(Iran)	Esteghlal	1–0	1–1
R16	(Saudi Arabia)	Al-Hilal	0–0 (4–3p)	
QF	(South Korea)	FC Seoul	3–2	1–1
SF	(South Korea)	Pohang Steelers	1–2	0–2

== Colours and kit ==
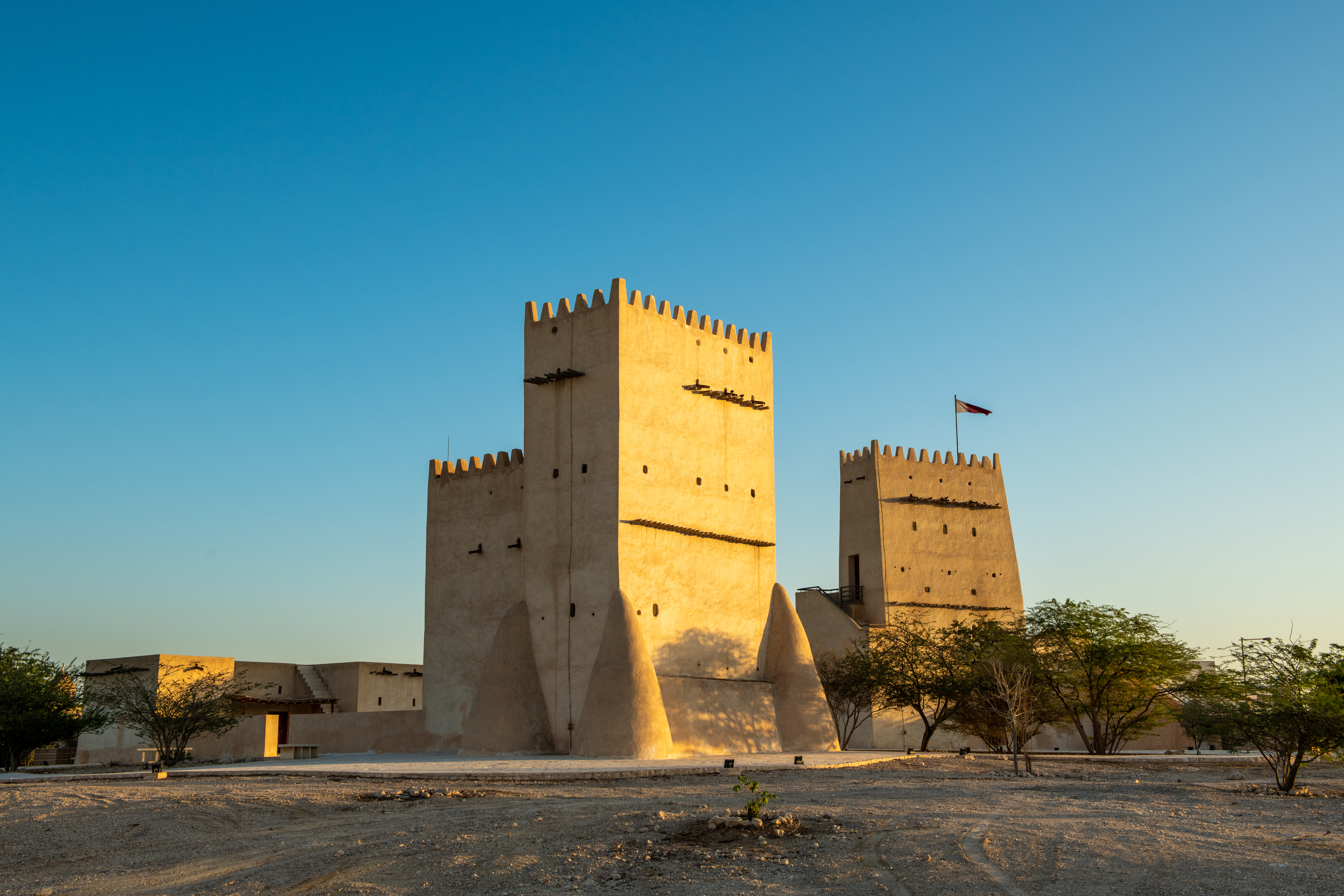
View of the Barzan Towers in Umm Salal Mohammed, featured on the crest

=== Shirt sponsors and manufacturers ===
Period	Kit manufacture	Shirt sponsor
2006–11	(United States) Nike	(Qatar) RasGas
2012-14	(United States) Nike	None
2014–15	(United States) Nike	(Qatar) MSC–Q
2015–16	(Germany) Puma	None
2016–17	(Germany) Adidas	None
2021-23	(Germany) Jako	None
2023-24	(Germany) Puma	None
2024–Present	(Germany) Jako	None

=== Kit history ===
Home kit from Ø–2007	Home kit from 2007 to 2009	Home kit from 2009 to 2011	Home kit from 2011 to 2012	Home kit from 2012 to 2013	Home kit from 2013–present

== Stadium ==
Built in 1996 in Umm Salal Ali, the Umm Salal Stadium covers 34,500 m^{2} and features two football pitches, locker rooms and an administrative office. However, due to its insufficient capacity and facilities, the club uses Thani bin Jassim Stadium as its homegrounds.

== Players ==
As of Qatari Second Division:

Note: Flags indicate national team as defined under FIFA eligibility rules; some limited exceptions apply. Players may hold more than one non-FIFA nationality.

No.	Pos.	Nation	Player
2	DF	QAT	Diyab Taha
3	DF	QAT	Abdalaziz Hazaa
4	DF	QAT	Youssef Gamal
5	DF	QAT	Sayed Issa
6	DF	QAT	Khalifa Al-Malki
7	FW	BIH	Matej Sakota
8	MF	QAT	Ibrahim Kala
11	FW	QAT	Meshaal Al-Shammeri
12	DF	QAT	Waleed El-Bahnasawi
13	GK	EGY	Louay Ashour
14	MF	CIV	Odilon Kouassi
16	MF	QAT	Abdurahman Al-Harazi
17	MF	QAT	Othman Al-Yahri
18	MF	QAT	Abdulrahman Anad

No.	Pos.	Nation	Player
19	DF	ALG	Naïm Laidouni
22	DF	NGR	Edidiong Essien
23	GK	SEN	Landing Badji
26	MF	COD	Noah Makanza
29	FW	MAR	Aïman Maurer
30	GK	QAT	Oumar Barry
32	MF	QAT	Ahmed Abdul Maqsoud
33	DF	SEN	Babacar Ndiaye
44	MF	QAT	Malik Qanaa
53	GK	EGY	Omar Aboelwafa
77	FW	JOR	Sultan Al-Shayab
99	FW	SEN	Fallou Faye
—	FW	CMR	Karl Toko Ekambi

== List of notable players ==
Only league games are counted. To appear in this list, a player must have made at least 50 appearances for the team.

Name	Nationality	Position	Debut	Appearances	Goals
Jawad Akeel	Netherlands	Midfielder	2006	141	4
Ibrahima Nadiya	Qatar	Midfielder	2003	133	28
Baba Malick	Qatar	Goalkeeper	2013	97	0
Yannick Sagbo	Ivory Coast	Striker	2015	95	51
Ismail Mousa	Qatar	Defender	2011	92	0
Dheyab Al-Annabi	Qatar	Midfielder	2014	86	2
Jeddo	Qatar	Striker	2007	82	4
Fábio César	Qatar	Midfielder	2006	76	21
Saoud Ghanem	Qatar	Midfielder	2006	74	4
Mohamed Husain	Bahrain	Defender	2009	73	1
Magno Alves	Brazil	Striker	2008	55	40
Dahi Al Naemi	Qatar	Midfielder	2007	55	2

== Board of directors ==
Position	Staff
President	(Qatar) Abdulaziz bin Abdulrahman Al-Thani
Vice-President	(Qatar) Tamim bin Mohamed Al-Thani
General secretary	(Qatar) Khalid Mohammed Al Jabbar
Assistant secretary	(Qatar) Hassan Ali Aman
Treasurer	(Qatar) Mohammed Khamis Al Ali
Board member	(Qatar) Abdullah bin Saud Al Thani
Board member	(Qatar) Jumaa Mubarak Ali
Board member	(Qatar) Mohammed Salem Al Naimi
Board member	(Qatar) Saber Mattar Al Sultan

Last updated: 1 May 2014
Source: Board of directors

== Managerial history ==
As of 11 May 2023

- (Qatar) Abdulaziz Ali Al Hammadi (1988)
- (Qatar) Abdulaziz Ali Al Hammadi (1995)
- (Iraq) Saad Hafez (1999–01)
- (Morocco) Said Razgui (2001–02)
- (Algeria) Lakhdar Belloumi (2003)
- (Egypt) Fareed Ramzy (2004)
- (Switzerland) Robert Mullier (2004–05)
- (Algeria) Abdelhak Benchikha (2005–06)
- (Morocco) Hassan Hormutallah (Feb 20, 2007–July 1, 2007)
- (France) Richard Tardy (July 1, 2007–Oct 26, 2007)
- (Morocco) Hameed Bremel (2007)
- (France) Laurent Banide (Nov 7, 2007–Nov 3, 2008)
- (France) Gérard Gili (Nov 16, 2008–April 12, 2010)
- (Netherlands) Henk ten Cate (April 12, 2010–Feb 6, 2011)
- (Morocco) Hassan Hormutallah (Feb 7, 2011–Nov 15, 2011)
- (France) Gérard Gili (Dec 15, 2011–June 30, 2012)
- (France) Bertrand Marchand (July 1, 2012–March 1, 2013)
- (France) Alain Perrin (March 9, 2013–Sept 30, 2013)
- (France) Gérard Gili (Sept 30, 2013–Dec 12, 2013)
- (Turkey) Bülent Uygun (Dec 12, 2013–Dec 14, 2016)
- (Egypt) Mahmoud Gaber (Dec 16, 2016–Feb, 2018)
- (Morocco) Talal El Karkouri (Feb 5, 2018–Dec 12, 2018)
- (France) Laurent Banide (Jul 1, 2018–Nov 14, 2018)
- (Spain) Raúl Caneda (Jan 1, 2019–Oct 25, 2019)
- (Tunisia) Ahmed El Abyad (Oct 30, 2019–Nov 3, 2019)
- (Morocco) Aziz Ben Askar (Nov 4, 2019–Jun 30,2021)
- (Brazil) Sérgio Farias (Jul 1, 2021–Oct 28,2021)
- (Qatar) Wesam Rizik (Oct 29, 2021–Jan 31,2023)
- (Morocco) Talal El Karkouri (Feb 1, 2023–2023)
- (France) Patrice Carteron (Jul 1, 2024–2024)
