= 1967–68 Qatar Stars League =

5th season of top-tier Qatari football

Qatar Stars League
- Season: 1967–68

Statistics of Qatar Stars League for the 1967–68 season.

== Overview ==
Al-Oruba won the championship.
