= Al Ahli SC (Doha) =

Multi-sport club in Qatar

Al-Ahli SC
- Full name: Al-Ahli Sports Club
- Nickname: Al Ameed (Brigadier)
- Founded: 1950; 76 years ago as Al Najah; 1972; 54 years ago as Al Ahli
- Ground: Hamad bin Khalifa Stadium
- Capacity: 12,000
- Chairman: Abdullah Yousef Al-Mulla
- Head coach: Borja Jiménez
- League: Qatar Stars League
- 2025–26: Qatar Stars League, 9th of 12
Home colours	Away colours

Al Ahli SC (Arabic: النادي الأهلي الرياضي), also known as Al Ahli Doha, is a Qatari multi-sport club based in Doha. It is most notable for its professional association football section. Their home ground is the Hamad bin Khalifa Stadium. Founded in 1950, it is the oldest sports club in Qatar.

== History ==
Al Ahli was founded under the name Al Najah Sports Club in 1950, rendering it the oldest surviving sports club in Qatar. Al Najah SC was established by the founders of another club, called Sawt al-Arab, which was subsequently disbanded. The most prominent of the founders was Naji Musaad, the first president of the club. The club's first headquarters was located in Barahat Al Jufairi, in a residential house which was rented at a monthly fee of 70 Indian rupees. In 1964, the club was formally founded under resolution no. 2. Their first match abroad was scheduled to take place against Al Muharraq. After travelling to Bahrain by sea, the club was turned down because their squad comprised foreign players. Instead, they played against Al Nusoor, whom they defeated 3–1.

In 1972, Al Najah was merged with another local club under its current name, Al Ahli Sports Club. The first board of directors was formed with eight members, and the club's colors were officially decided as green and white. Early managers after the merger include Mohammed Kheiri, the first manager of Al Ahli Sports Club, Sudanese Abdullah Balash, Lebanese Omar Khatib and Sudanese Hassan Osman. They played a friendly against Pelé-led Santos in 1973 at Doha Sports Stadium. In the 1983/84 season, the club received a new headquarters, equipped with modern training and recreational facilities, as did all of the other sports clubs in Qatar.

In September 1985, amidst a heavy debt of QAR 700,000, the club announced that it would not contract with any foreign players for that season to preserve its funds. As a result, five Yugoslavian players it had recently signed for its basketball, handball and volleyball teams would be released. The Ministry of Youth and Sports injected QAR 500,000 and its supporters and members raised over QAR 300,000 to help the club pay off debt and contract professionals.

In the early nineties, under the presidency of Sheikh Khalid bin Ali Al Thani, the club was relegated to the Qatari 2nd Division for the first time in its history. In an attempt to improve its younger generation of players by providing them with invaluable first team experience, the youth team had been given an opportunity to earn promotion back to the first division. They were unsuccessful, and only were runners up that year.

The club has won one domestic trophy since its formation, the Emir Cup. This competition which was secured four times, with the first triumph coming in the inaugural edition under coach Mohammed Kheiri.

== Stadium ==
Al Ahli play their home matches at Hamad bin Khalifa Stadium which has a capacity of 12,000 seats.

== Supporters ==
The club has one of the most consistently high home attendances in the Qatar Stars League. On 11 April 2014, they set a new league record for final match day attendance with 10,142 fans attending the league match against Al Sailiya.

== Players ==
As of Qatar Stars League:

Note: Flags indicate national team as defined under FIFA eligibility rules; some limited exceptions apply. Players may hold more than one non-FIFA nationality.

No.	Pos.	Nation	Player
1	GK	QAT	Yazan Naim
3	DF	QAT	Islam Yassine
5	DF	NGR	William Troost-Ekong
6	MF	QAT	Luiz Júnior
7	MF	GER	Julian Draxler
8	MF	QAT	Talal Al-Shila
10	FW	ESP	Erik Expósito
11	MF	QAT	Suhaib Gannan
12	DF	QAT	Ghanem Al-Minhali
13	GK	QAT	Mohamed Lingliz
14	MF	NED	Michel Vlap
15	DF	QAT	Yousef Marei
16	DF	FIN	Robin Tihi
18	DF	QAT	Jassem Mohammed Omar

No.	Pos.	Nation	Player
20	MF	QAT	Hamad Mansour
21	DF	QAT	Mohammed Al-Ishak
25	GK	ESP	Hugo Moya
27	MF	FRA	Benjamin Bourigeaud
32	FW	QAT	Navid Dorzadeh
33	MF	MAR	Driss Fettouhi
35	GK	QAT	Marwan Badreldin
41	DF	QAT	Ahmed Reyed
49	DF	TUN	Zinedine Sassi
70	FW	QAT	Younis Abdelrahman
77	MF	QAT	Ismaeel Mohammad
88	DF	MAR	Ayoub Amraoui
—	DF	PAN	Yosafar Lenis (on loan from Millonarios)
—	MF	FRA	Yanis Fathelddine

=== Out on loan ===
Note: Flags indicate national team as defined under FIFA eligibility rules; some limited exceptions apply. Players may hold more than one non-FIFA nationality.

No. / Pos. / Nation / Player; — / DF / QAT / Ali Shahabi (at Qatar U23)	No. / Pos. / Nation / Player; — / MF / NED / Don O'Niel (at Al-Waab)

== Managerial history ==
As of 10 May 2023

Seasons	Manager	Nationality
1972–73	Mohammed Hassan Kheiri	(Sudan)
1975–??	Ali Al Attar	(Egypt)
1978–??	Helmi Hussein	(Egypt)
1 Jul 1982 – 30 Jun 1984	Ivo Wortmann	(Brazil)
1984–85	Eid Mubarak	(Qatar)
1985–86	Colin Addison	(England)
1987–88	Joubert Meira	(Brazil)
1988	Sebastião Lazaroni	(Brazil)
1991	Zoran Đorđević	(Serbia)
1991–93	Paulo Massa	(Brazil)
1994–95	Faruk Pašić	(Bosnia and Herzegovina)
1997–98	Abdelkader Youmir	(Morocco)
1998	Heshmat Mohajerani	(Iran)
1998–99	Anatoliy Prokopenko	(Ukraine)
1999	Abdelkader Youmir	(Morocco)
1999	Sead Gruda; Abdulqadir Almoghaisab	(Bosnia and Herzegovina) (Qatar)
1999–00	José Robles	(Brazil)
2000–01	Cruz	(Portugal)
2001	José Robles	(Brazil)
2001	Eid Mubarak	(Qatar)
1 Jul 2002 – 30 Jun 2003	Carlos Alhinho	(Portugal)
2003	Pepe	(Brazil)
16 Jul 2004 – 8 Nov 2004	Augusto Inácio	(Portugal)
2004–05	Pepe	(Brazil)
2005	Oswaldo de Oliveira	(Brazil)
2005–Feb 2006	Waldemar Lemos; Oswaldo de Oliveira	(Brazil) (Brazil)
Feb 2006–2006	José Robles	(Brazil)
2006	Michel Decastel	(Switzerland)
2006	Reiner Hollmann	(Germany)

Seasons	Manager	Nationality
2006–07	José Robles	(Brazil)
1 Jul 2007 – 30 Jun 2008	Mark Wotte	(Netherlands)
2008–09	Erik van der Meer	(Netherlands)
2009	Mrad Mahjoub	(Tunisia)
2009	Carlos Manuel	(Portugal)
2009	Heron Ricardo Ferreira	(Brazil)
2009	Abdulqadir Almoghaisab (CT)	(Qatar)
2009	Abdullah Mubarak	(Qatar)
2009–10	José Robles	(Brazil)
2010	Hassan Hormatallah	(Morocco)
1 Jul 2010– 10 Sep 2010	Ilija Petković	(Serbia)
26 Sep 2010 – 23 Oct 2011	Abdullah Mubarak	(Qatar)
23 Oct 2011 – 30 Jun 2012	Bernard Simondi	(France)
1 Jul 2012 – 30 Jun 2013	Henri Atamaniuk	(France)
1 Jul 2012 – 7 Feb 2015	Milan Máčala	(Czech Republic)
7 Feb 2015 – 1 Feb 2016	Zlatko Kranjčar	(Croatia)
1 Feb 2016 – 11 May 2016	Yousuf Adam (interim)	(Qatar)
11 May 2016 – 30 Oct 2016	Luka Bonačić	(Croatia)
30 Oct 2016 – 1 Jun 2017	Yousuf Adam	(Qatar)
2 Jun 2017 – 27 Dec 2017	Joaquín Caparrós	(Spain)
1 Jan 2018 – Jun 2018	Jorge Peris	(Spain)
Jun 2018	Yusef Ahmad Baker (interim)	(Qatar)
Jun 2018 – Dec 2018	Milan Máčala	(Czech Republic)
14 Dec 2018 – 18 Nov 2019	Rubén de la Barrera	(Spain)
1 Dec 2019 – 14 Sep 2023	Nebojša Jovović	(Montenegro)

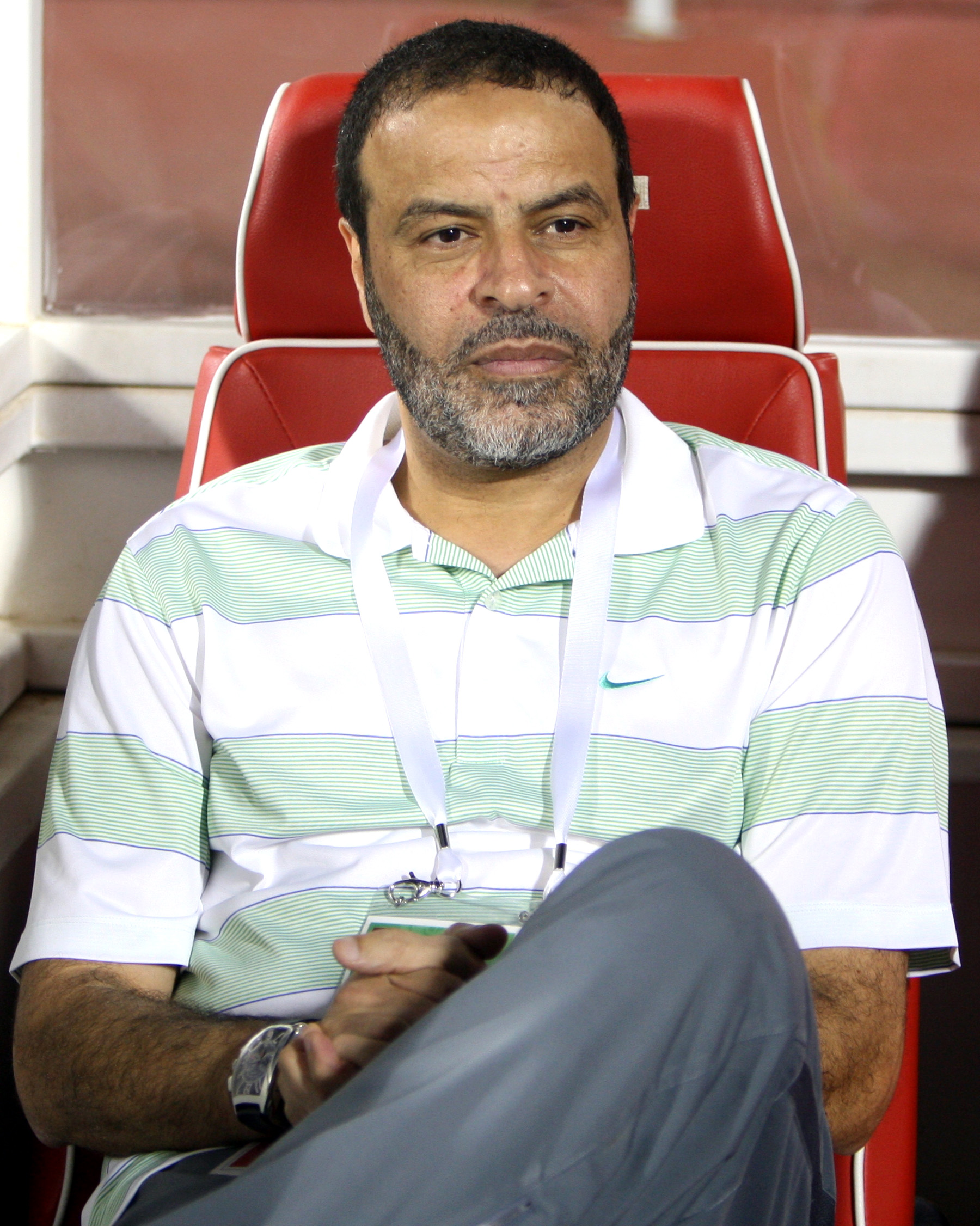
Abdullah Mubarak, former manager of Al Ahli

== Al Ahli club staff ==
Last update: 13 Feb 2026.

Senior team
Technical staff
Head coach	Borja Jiménez
Assistant coach	Ivan Hucko; Khalid Taj
Head of transatlantic relations	Samuel Alger
Medical staff
Head of clinic	Dr Tawfiq
Team doctor	Sokryi
Physiotherapist	Anselmo
Physiotherapist	Assad Ammari
Team staff
Director of reserve team	Majed Saeed
Director of administration	Abdulaziz Hamza
Director of football	Ibrahim Al Karaniris
Deputy director of football	Khalid Shabib
Director of sports affairs	Abdullah Jassim
Director of sport marketing	Yaqoub Nasser
ATI Systems	Youssef Bizzou

Youth teams
Technical staff
U23 manager	Hassan Khalil Ahmed
U23 head coach	Ivan Hucko
U23 assistant coach	Hussein Baqir
U16 head coach	John Lake
U16 assistant coach	Abdulredha Hussein

Youth teams
Medical staff
Physiotherapist	Islam Salahuddin
Physiotherapist	Ihab Abdelfatah
Team staff
Head of youth teams	Fahad Al Wadanaa
Deputy head of youth teams	Ahmad Sayyar

== Club officials ==
=== Board ===
Position	Staff
President	(Qatar) Abdulla Yousef Al-Mulla
Vice-president	(Qatar) Mohammed Abdulla Al-Mustafawi Al-Hashemi
General secretary	(Qatar) Aref Abdulrahman

Last updated: February 2012
Source: Board of Directors

== Club presidents ==
As of February 2012.

No.	Chairperson	No.	Chairperson
1	(Qatar) Naji Musaad	8	(Qatar) Abdullah Mohammed Ghurery
2	(Qatar) Sheikh Mubarak bin Ahmed Al-Thani	9	(Qatar) Ali bin Ali Ahmed
3	(Qatar) Sheikh Ali bin Abdulaziz Al-Thani	10	(Qatar) Sheikh Abdulrahman bin Nasser Al-Thani
4	(Qatar) Sheikh Mohammed bin Saud Al-Thani	11	(Qatar) Abdullah Ahmad Hashemi
5	(Qatar) Sultan bin Sultan	12	(Qatar) Mohammed Kadhim Ibrahim
6	(Qatar) Abdulaziz Fahad Bozzoer	13	(Qatar) Sheikh Khalid bin Ali Al Thani
7	(Qatar) Abdulrahman Abdulqadir Al Moghaisib	14	(Qatar) Sheikh Ahmed bin Hamad Al Thani

== Records and statistics ==
=== Player statistics ===
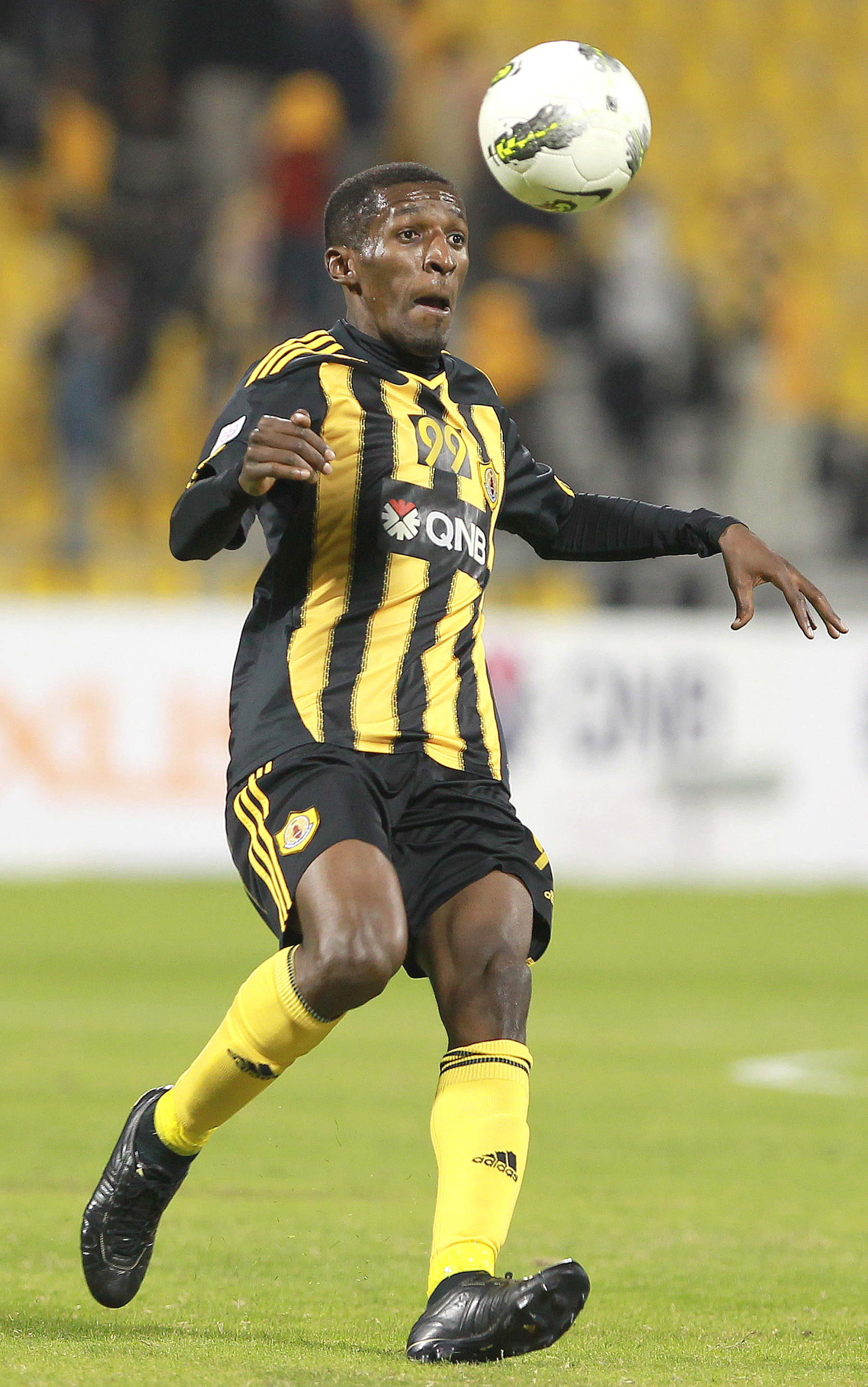
Meshal Abdullah holds the record for most league goals scored for Al Ahli

Last update: 10 December 2024.
Players whose names are in bold are still active with the club.

Most goals
#	Nat.	Name	League Goals	Years active
1	(Qatar)	Meshal Abdullah	120	1999–2007, 2008–2010, 2013–2019
2	(Democratic Republic of the Congo)	Dioko Kaluyituka	60	2011–2015
3	(Senegal)	Alboury Lah	29	1995–1998
4	(Cape Verde)	Caló	26	2002–2006
5	(Democratic Republic of the Congo)	Ndombe Mubele	16	2015–2017
6	(Morocco)	Nabil El Zhar	15	2019–2021
7	(Iran)	Mojtaba Jabbari	15	2013–2017
8	(Burkina Faso)	Juma Mossi	15	2001–2002
9	(Brazil)	Wagner Ribeiro	13	2009–2011
10	(Oman)	Badar Al-Maimani	12	2005–2007
10	(Brazil)	Sérgio Ricardo	12	2005–2006

=== Performance in UAFA competitions ===
- **UAFA Club Cup: 2 appearances**

2003/04: First round
2007/08: First round

=== Performance in AFC competitions ===
- **Asian Cup Winners Cup: 2 appearances**

1992/93: First Round
1998/99: Second Round

=== Asian record ===
Year	Tournament	Round	Club	Home	Away	Aggregate
1993	Asian Cup Winners' Cup	Group stage	(Kuwait) Al-Arabi	0–0	0–1	0–1
1999	Asian Cup Winners' Cup	1	(Lebanon) Nejmeh	w.o.^{1}	0–0	0–0
1999	Asian Cup Winners' Cup	2	(Saudi Arabia) Al-Ittihad	0–0	1–7	1–7

1. Al Nejmeh SC withdrew from the tournament.

== Honours ==
- Emir of Qatar Cup
  - Winners (4): 1973, 1981, 1987, 1992
  - Runners-up (5): 1975, 1984, 1985, 1998, 2003
- Sheikh Jassem Cup
  - Runners-up (2): 1999, 2006
- Qatari 2nd Division
  - Winners (1): 2012
- UAE-Qatar Challenge Cup
  - Winners (1): 2026
