= Qatar Stars League 2 =

- Founded: 1979; 47 years ago as Qatar Second Division
- Country: Qatar
- Confederation: AFC
- Number of clubs: TBD
- Level on pyramid: 2
- Promotion to: Qatar Stars League
- Relegation to: Qatar Stars League 3
- Domestic cup(s): Sheikh Jassem Cup; Qatari Second Division Cup
- Current champions: Lusail SC (1st title) ( 2025–26)
- Most championships: Al-Markhiya (6 titles)
- Current: 2026–27 Qatar Stars League 2

The Qatari Stars League 2 (Arabic: دوري الدرجة الثانية القطري), QSL 2,is the second tier of the two-tier football league competition in Qatar. it operates on a system of promotion and relegation with the Qatar Stars League (QSL), the top-tier football league in the country. The QSD seasons, like those of the QSL, run from September to April.

The league's first season was played in 1979 which was won by Al-Ittihad. The club with the most QSD wins is Al-Markhiya which has won 6 QSD titles. According to the league's development strategy, starting with the 2022–23 season, the first-placed club of this league will play a relegation match against the tenth-placed club of the first league to decide which club will participate in the first league next season. There is no relegation from the second division.

== History ==
In 1990, the Qatar Football Association dissolved three second division clubs: Al Nasr, Al Tadamon, and Al Nahda. The clubs' players and staff were distributed to first division clubs. As a result, the Qatari Second Division was unofficially dissolved on a temporary basis. The competition resumed operations in the 1996–97 season. The first promotion play-off took place in the 1999–00 season, between Second Division champions Muaither SC and the bottom-ranked team of the Qatar Stars League, Al Shamal. Muaither lost the match.

It was announced on 15 April 2009 that no clubs would be relegated from the top flight in the 2008–09 season, due to expansion reasons, however the announcement was made with only one game remaining. This meant that the Qatari Second Division would remain with the same number of teams despite the recent formation of Lekhwiya SC and El Jaish SC, while the top flight would expand to 12 teams.

On 6 October 2013 it was announced Qatari Second Division had a sponsorship with Qatargas.

An annual competition known as the Qatari Second Division Cup is played by all second division clubs.

== Clubs ==
=== Champions ===
Club	Champions	Winning years
Al-Markhiya	6	1994–95, 1995–96, 1996–97, 1998–99, 2016–17, 2021–22
Al-Sailiya	4	2002–03, 2004–05, 2006–07, 2011–12, 2006–07, 2024–25
Al-Gharafa	4	1979–80, 1981–82, 1983–84, 1986–87
Al-Shamal	4	1985–86, 2002–03, 2014–15, 2020–21
El-Jaish	3	2007–08, 2008–09, 2010–11
Umm-Salal	3	1997–98, 1999–2000, 2005–06
Al-Kharaitiyat	2	2003–04, 2019–20
Al-Khor	2	1982–83, 2023–24
Al-Wakrah	2	1984–85, 2018–19
Al-Rayyan	2	1988–89, 2014–15
Muaither	2	2015–16, 2022–23
Al-Shahania	1	2017–18
Al-Mesaimeer	1	2000–01
Al-Ahli	1	2012–13
Al-Duhail	1	2009–10
Al-Nahda (now known as Al-Mesaimeer)	1	1980–81
Lusail SC	1	2025–26

=== 2026–27 season ===
Qatari Second Division
Club	Location	Stadium	Year Formed
Al Bidda SC	Doha		2015
Al Kharaitiyat	Al Kharaitiyat	Al Khor SC Stadium	1996
Al-Khor	Al Khor	Al-Khor SC Stadium	1961
Al-Mesaimeer	Al-Rayyan,	Al-Sailiya SC Stadium	1996
Al-Shahania	Al-Rayyan,	Grand Hamad Stadium	1998
Al-Waab	Al Waab, Doha		2019
Al Rayyan Next-Gen	Al Rayyan, Umm Al Afaei		2026
Muaither SC	Muaither, Al-Rayyan	Thani bin Jassim Stadium	1996

== Championship history ==
=== Total titles won by town or city ===
Town or city	Number of titles	Clubs
Al Rayyan	14	Al-Sailiya SC (4), Al-Gharafa SC (4), Al-Rayyan SC (2), Muaither SC (2), Mesaimeer (1), Al-Shahania (1)
Doha	12	Al-Markhiya (6), Al-Jaish (3), Lekhwiya SC (1), Al Ahli (1), Al-Nahda (1)
Umm Salal	5	Umm Salal SC (3), Al Kharaitiyat (2)
Al Shamal	4	Al-Shamal (4)
Al Wakrah	2	Al-Wakrah SC (2)
Al Khor	1	Al-Taawun (Al Khor) (1)

== Top scorers ==
Year		Best scorers	Team	Goals
1998–99	(Sudan)	Osama Adam	?	13
2007–08	(Uruguay)	Gonzalo Gutiérrez	Al Markhiya	15
2008–09	(Uruguay)	Gonzalo Gutiérrez	Muaither	14
2010–11	(Qatar)	Abdulqadir Ilyas	El Jaish	12
2011–12	(France)	Michaël N'dri	Al Sailiya	16
2012–13	(Rwanda)	Jean-Paul Eale Lutula	Muaither	12
2013–14	(Iran)	Ali Ferydoon	Al Shamal	19
2014–15	(Qatar)	Rodrigo Tabata	Al Rayyan	20
2015–16	(Jordan)	Mahmoud Za'tara	Muaither	20
2016–17	(Burkina Faso)	Selemani Ndikumana	Mesaimeer	19
2017–18	(Argentina)	Luciano Vázquez	Al Shahaniya	15
2018–19	(France) (Ghana) (Ghana)	Mamadou Diawara; Omar Ali; Nana Poku	Muaither; Al Wakrah; Al Wakrah	10
2019–20	(Morocco)	Rachid Tiberkanine	Al Kharaitiyat	18
2020–21	(Jordan) (Senegal)	Baha' Faisal; Birahim Gaye	Al Shamal; Al Shahaniya	17
2021–22	(Morocco)	Rachid Tiberkanine	Al Kharaitiyat	8
2022–23	(Morocco)	Alaeddine Ajaraie	Muaither	11
2023–24	(Mauritania) (Brazil)	Idrissa Thiam; Tiago Reis	Mesaimeer	10
