= Qatar SC =

Association football club in Qatar

Qatar SC نادي قطر الرياضي (Arabic)
- Full name: Qatar Sports Club
- Nickname: The King
- Founded: 1959; 67 years ago
- Ground: Suheim bin Hamad Stadium
- Capacity: 13,000
- Chairman: Sheikh Hamad bin Suhaim Al Thani
- Head coach: Rashid Al-Kubaisi
- League: Qatar Stars League
- 2025–26: Qatar Stars League, 6th of 12
- Website: qatarsc.qa
Home colours	Away colours

Qatar Sports Club (Arabic: نادي قطر الرياضي) is a sports club based in Doha, Qatar. It is best known for its football team which competes in the Qatar Stars League. The club was founded in 1959 with the merger of two Qatari football clubs, Al-Oruba and Al-Nasour.

They play their home games in the Qatar SC Stadium, which can accommodate 13,000 spectators. The club has recently diversified into sports other than football with an athletics division having been established, competing in sprinting, long jump and javelin throwing. The club adopted its current name, Qatar SC, in 1981.

== History ==
=== Formation (1972) ===
In 1972, Al-Oruba merged with Al-Nasour to form a new football club named Al-Esteqlal. Former player Saad Mohammed Saleh was selected as the first coach. Al Esteqlal was one of the strongest clubs right from its establishment, winning its first official Q-League season in 1972–73. The next year, in 1974, Al Sadd hired head coach Hassan Othman from the club in addition to 14 of its players, including Hassan Mattar and Mubarak Anber, much to the dismay of club president Hamad bin Suhaim. During this period, transfers could be made unconditionally in Qatari football. Despite the resounding difficulties arising from the transfer fiasco, the club continued with its success, winning the 1976–77 season and supplying the national team with some of its most prominent players.

=== 1981–present: Qatar SC ===
Al Esteqlal was renamed Qatar SC in 1981. However, it gradually faded into obscurity for the next 2 decades, with the league being dominated by Al Arabi, Al Sadd, and Al Rayyan. The club won the Qatar Crown Prince Cup in 2002 and also won the 2002–03 league season by three points. They won the Crown Prince Cup the same year, and again in 2009. The club was relegated to Qatari Second Division after the 2015-16 season, but were promoted back to the top division the next season.

== Name history ==
- –1972: Al-Oruba and Al Nasour
- 1972: The club was founded by a merger of Al-Oruba and Al Nasour, and was named Al Esteqlal
- 1981: The club was renamed Qatar Sports Club

== Stadium ==
Qatar SC play their matches at Suheim bin Hamad Stadium, which is located in Doha's seaside district of Al Dafna. It is a multi-purpose stadium, featuring an athletics field, a gym, a shopping centre and a mosque, among other facilities. The stadium has a capacity of 13,000 seats.

Besides local football matches, the stadium also hosts a number of tournaments such as Qatar Athletic Super Grand Prix and some of the 2011 AFC Asian Cup matches.

== Players ==
As of Qatar Stars League:

Note: Flags indicate national team as defined under FIFA eligibility rules; some limited exceptions apply. Players may hold more than one non-FIFA nationality.

No.	Pos.	Nation	Player
2	DF	QAT	Nasir Baksh
4	DF	TUN	Ali Saoudi
5	MF	ISL	Aron Gunnarsson
6	MF	ESP	Pau Prim (on loan from Al-Sadd)
7	MF	COM	Faïz Selemani
8	MF	CZE	Lukáš Kalvach
9	FW	BRA	João Pedro
10	FW	BRA	Bruno Tabata
11	FW	CIV	Yohan Boli
12	MF	QAT	Ibrahim Masoud
14	MF	QAT	Said Brahmi
15	DF	QAT	Khalid Al-Obaidly
16	MF	QAT	Abdulrahman Mohsin
17	GK	QAT	Ali Nader

No.	Pos.	Nation	Player
18	MF	QAT	Mohamed Mushrinn
19	MF	QAT	Abdulrasheed Umaru
20	DF	QAT	Eisa Palangi
21	DF	QAT	Abdullah Maarafiya
22	FW	ESP	Albert Luque
23	FW	QAT	Sebastián Soria
24	DF	ENG	Niall Mason
28	DF	GHA	Akwasi Addai
33	GK	QAT	Adnan Ali
40	DF	SEN	Fallou Diouf
42	DF	QAT	Yacine Lafrid
44	DF	QAT	Anas Hanfy
66	DF	SDN	Abu Al-Qasim Ayman
74	GK	QAT	Satea Abdelnasser

=== Out on loan ===
Note: Flags indicate national team as defined under FIFA eligibility rules; some limited exceptions apply. Players may hold more than one non-FIFA nationality.

No.	Pos.	Nation	Player
—	MF	CMR	Raoul Danzabe (at Al-Sailiya)

== Honours ==
- Qatar Stars League
  - Champions (8): 1966-67, 1967-68, 1968-69, 1969-70, 1970-71, 1972–73, 1976–77, 2002–03
- Emir of Qatar Cup
  - Champions (8): 1966-67, 1967-68, 1968-69, 1969-70, 1970-71, 1971–72, 1973–74, 1975–76
- Qatar Crown Prince Cup
  - Champions (3): 2002, 2004, 2009
- Qatar Sheikh Jassem Cup
  - Champions (4): 1983, 1984, 1987, 1995
- Qatari Stars Cup/QNB Cup
  - Champions (1): 2014

== Records and statistics ==
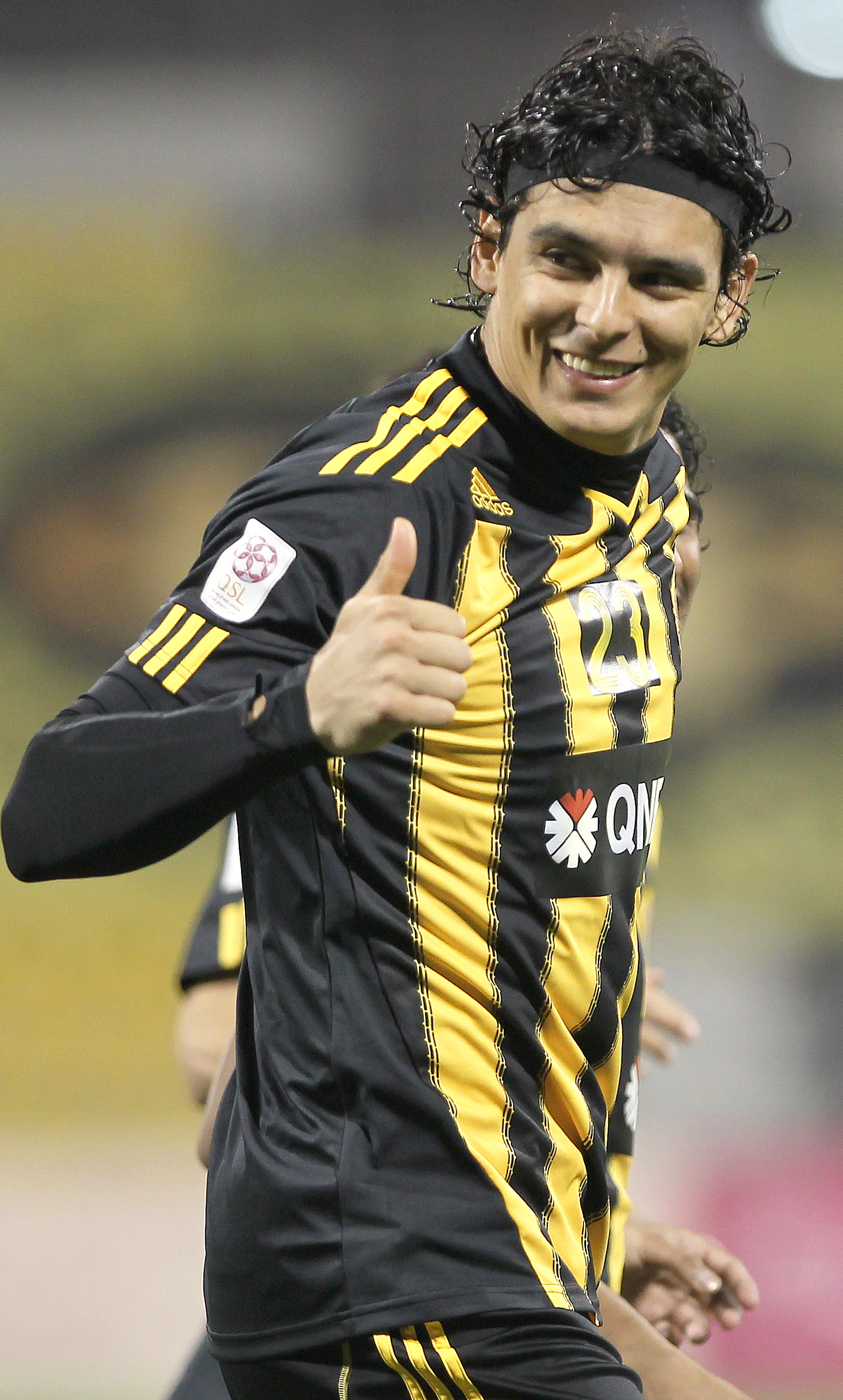
Sebastián Soria holds the club record for most league goals

Last update: 15 March 2023.
Players whose names are in bold are still active with the club.

Most goals
#	Nat.	Name	League Goals
1	(Qatar)	**Sebastián Soria**	116
2	(Angola)	Akwá	43
3	(Oman)	Amad Al-Hosni	36
4	(Qatar)	Abdulaziz Hassan Bujaloof	31
5	(Brazil)	Marcinho	25
6	(Tunisia)	Hamdi Harbaoui	21
7	(Qatar)	Yasser Nazmi	18
8	(Qatar)	Mousa Al Allaq	18

== Recent seasons ==
Season	Division	Pos.	Pl.	W	D	L	GS	GA	P	Emir Cup
1996–97	1D	7	16	4	3	9	19	19	15	Round 1
1997–98	1D	6	16	5	4	7	17	22	19	Round 1
1998–99	1D	6	16	5	2	9	16	27	17	Round 1
1999–2000	1D	7	16	4	6	6	14	24	18	Quarter-finals
2000–01	1D	8	16	4	2	10	18	27	14	Round 2
2001–02	1D	2	16	9	2	5	30	17	29	Semifinals
2002–03	1D	1	18	10	5	3	24	10	34	Semifinals
2003–04	1D	2	18	10	4	4	31	17	34	Runners-up
2004–05	1D	4	27	14	3	10	40	34	45	Quarter-finals
2005–06	1D	2	27	14	7	6	49	34	49	Semifinals
2006–07	1D	6	27	10	4	13	35	36	34	Quarter-finals
2007–08	1D	4	27	14	4	9	53	38	46	Semifinals
2008–09	1D	4	27	11	10	6	42	36	43	Semifinals
2009–10	1D	4	22	11	5	6	32	23	38	Semifinals
2010–11	1D	5	22	11	7	4	40	26	40	Quarter-finals
2011–12	1D	10	22	6	6	10	32	46	24	Round 3

== Technical staff ==
=== Senior team ===
As of 29 November 2023

Coaching staff
Head coach	(Qatar) Rashid Al-Kubaisi
Assistant coach	(Spain) Miquel Gomila
Goalkeeper coach	(Spain) Ángel Pindado
Fitness coach	(Spain) Xavier Pedrero (Spain) Dani Acosta
Match analysis	(Spain) Sergio Márquez
Team doctor	(Romania) Ovidiu Dragoș
Physiotherapist	(Qatar) Abdurahman Al Jabbar
Kit manager	(Qatar) Hassan Al Naimi
General manager	(Qatar) Khalid Al-Shammeri

=== Youth team ===
Coaching staff
Head coach	(Qatar) Yousef Al Noubi
Technical director	(France) David Giguel
Goalkeeping coach	(Egypt) Abdel Fattah Nassef
Fitness coach	(Egypt) Abdulziz Al Kahlawi

== Managerial history ==
As of 10 May 2023

Manager	Period
(Sudan) Hamad Neel Mohammed Ali	c. 1962
(Sudan) Saad Mohammed Saleh	c. 1972
(Egypt) Helmi Hussein	1973–74
(Egypt) Wagdi Jamal	1974
(Sudan) Hassan Othman (Egypt) Helmi Hussein	1974–75
(Sudan) Mohammed Kheiri	1975–76
(Slovakia) Jozef Jankech (Slovakia) Jozef Vengloš	1976–77
(Brazil) Jorvan Vieira	1980
(South Korea) Park Byung-suk	c. 1980–81
(Brazil) Paulo Massa	1988
(Germany) Uli Maslo	July 1, 1988–90
(Brazil) Sérgio Cosme	1990
(Bosnia and Herzegovina) Džemaludin Mušović	1990–91
(Germany) Uli Maslo	1991 – April 30, 1992
(Iraq) Ammo Baba	1992–93
(Slovakia) Jozef Jankech	1993–94
(Iraq) Hazem Jassam	1994
(Sweden) Roland Andersson	July 1, 1995 – June 30, 1997
(Czech Republic) Ján Pivarník	1997
(Germany) Reinhard Fabisch	1998–00
(Qatar) Eid Mubarak	2000
(Czech Republic) Verner Lička	July 1, 2000 – June 15, 2001
(Serbia) Zoran Đorđević	2001–02
(Bosnia and Herzegovina) Džemaludin Mušović	2002–04

Manager	Period
(Qatar) Adel Abu Karbal (Qatar) Salman Abdulaziz	2004
(Portugal) Carlos Alhinho	2004 – June 30, 2005
(Belgium) Dimitri Davidovic	July 1, 2005 – June 30, 2006
(Bosnia and Herzegovina) Džemal Hadžiabdić	2006
(France) Yannick Stopyra	Nov 2006 – Jan 07
(Croatia) Srećko Juričić	2007
(Belgium) Dimitri Davidovic	2007
(Bosnia and Herzegovina) Džemaludin Mušović	2007–08
(Morocco) Hameed Bremel	2008
(Brazil) Sebastião Lazaroni	July 24, 2008 – Aug 11
(Morocco) Saïd Chiba	Aug 12, 2011 – July 8, 2012
(Brazil) Sebastião Lazaroni	July 9, 2012 – June 1, 2014
(Czech Republic) Ivan Hašek	June 1, 2014 – September 11, 2014
(Iraq) Radhi Shenaishil	September 11, 2014 – October 26, 2015
(Brazil) Sebastião Lazaroni	October 26, 2015– June 27, 2016
(Romania) Aurel Țicleanu	June 28, 2016– December 26, 2016
(Netherlands) Erik van der Meer	December 29, 2016 – May 31, 2017
(Argentina) Gabriel Calderón	July 1, 2017 – June 30, 2018
(Qatar) Abdullah Mubarak	November 25, 2017 – September 17, 2018
(Qatar) Yousuf Al-Noubi	September 17, 2018 – October 10, 2018
(Argentina) Sergio Batista	October 10, 2018 – June 30, 2019
(Spain) Carlos Alós	July 1, 2019 – October 20, 2019
(Qatar) Wesam Rizik	October 21, 2019 – June 30, 2021
(Brazil) Zé Ricardo	June 2021 – October 2021
(Qatar) Yousuf Al-Noubi	October 2021
(Morocco) Youssef Safri	October 2021 – October 2023
(Portugal) Helio Sousa	October 2023 – April 2024
(Qatar) Yousuf Al-Noubi	April 2024 – September 2024
(Morocco) Youssef Safri	September 2024 – May 2025
(Spain) Tintín Márquez	June 2025 – present

== Performance in AFC competitions ==
- **AFC Champions League: 1 appearance**

2003–04: Group Stage
