= 2007 Copa Libertadores finals =

- Event: 2007 Copa Toyota Libertadores
| Boca Juniors | Grêmio |
| (Argentina) | (Brazil) |
| 5 | 0 |
- on aggregate

First leg
| Boca Juniors | Grêmio |
| 3 | 0 |
- Date: 13 June 2007
- Venue: La Bombonera, Buenos Aires
- Man of the Match: Juan Román Riquelme
- Referee: Jorge Larrionda
- Attendance: 50,993

Second leg
| Grêmio | Boca Juniors |
| 0 | 2 |
- Date: 20 June 2007
- Venue: Estádio Olímpico, Porto Alegre
- Man of the Match: Juan Román Riquelme
- Referee: Óscar Ruiz
- Attendance: 53,952

The 2007 Copa Libertadores finals was a two-legged football match-up to determine the 2007 Copa Libertadores champion. The series was contested between Argentine club Boca Juniors and Brazilian club Grêmio. The first leg of the tie was played on June 13 at Boca Juniors' home field, La Bombonera, with the second leg played on June 20 at Gremio's Estádio Olímpico. Boca Juniors won the series 5–0 on aggregate, achieving their sixth Copa Libertadores title.

== Qualified teams ==
| Team | Previous finals app. |
|---|---|
| (Argentina) Boca Juniors | 1963, **1977**, **1978**, 1979, **2000**, **2001**, **2003**, 2004 |
| (Brazil) Grêmio | **1983**, 1984, **1995** |

Bold indicates winning years

== Venues ==
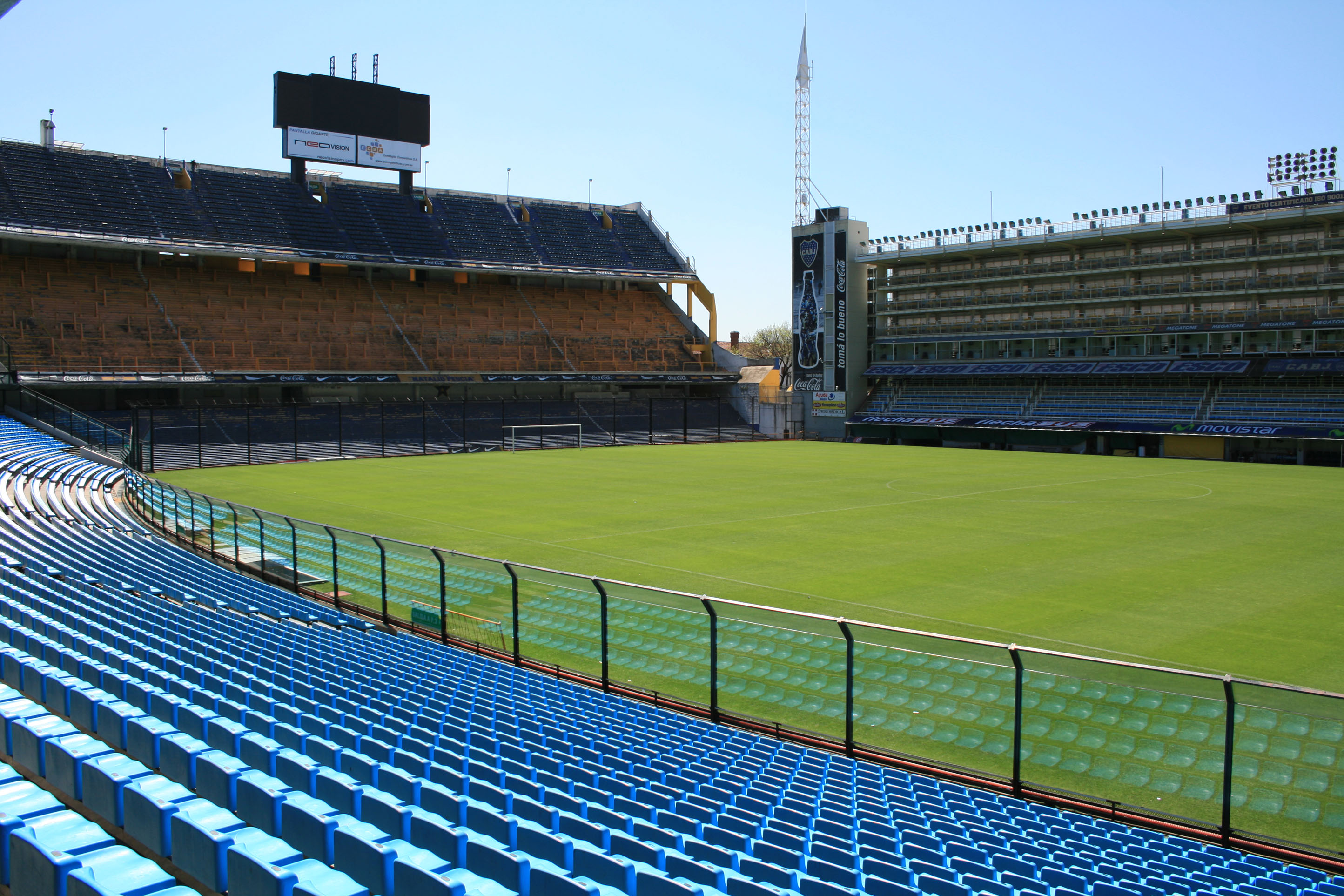
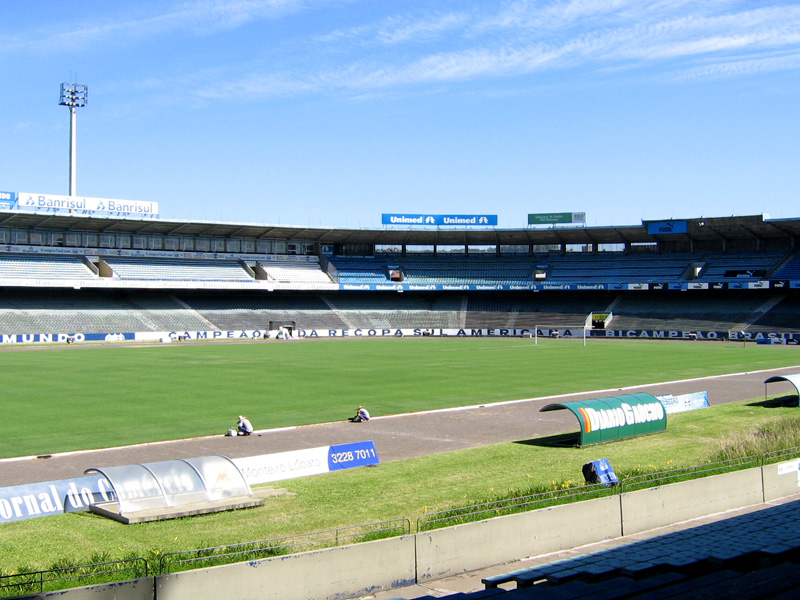
La Bombonera (Buenos Aires) and Estádio Olímpico (Porto Alegre), venues for the finals

== Route to the finals ==
| Grêmio | | | Boca Juniors | |
|---|---|---|---|---|
| (Brazil) São Paulo; A **0–1** | | **Round of 16**; First leg | (Argentina) Vélez Sársfield; H **3–0** | Riquelme 9'; Palermo 61'; Rodríguez 89' |
| (Brazil) São Paulo; H **2–0** | Tcheco 17'; Diego Souza 74' | Second leg | (Argentina) Vélez Sársfield; A **1–3** | Bustos (o.g.) 32' |
| (Uruguay) Defensor Sporting; A **0–2** | | **Quarterfinals**; First leg | (Paraguay) Libertad; H **1–1** | Palermo 90' |
| (Uruguay) Defensor Sporting; H **2–0** (p. 4–2) | Tcheco 22'; Teco 45' | Second leg | (Paraguay) Libertad; A **2–0** | Riquelme 61'; Palacio |
| (Brazil) Santos; H **2–0** | Tcheco 34'; Carlos Eduardo 36' | **Semifinals**; First leg | (Colombia) Cúcuta Deportivo; A **1–3** | Ledesma 27' |
| (Brazil) Santos; A **1–3** | Diego Souza 34' | Second leg | (Colombia) Cúcuta Deportivo; H **3–0** | Riquelme 44'; Palermo 61'; Battaglia 90' |

== Matches ==
=== First leg ===
13 June 2007
21:45 (UTC-3)
First leg

| Boca Juniors (Argentina) | 3–0 | (Brazil) Grêmio |
|---|---|---|
| Palacio 18'; Riquelme 73'; Patrício 89' (o.g.) | Report |

La Bombonera, Buenos Aires
Attendance: 50,993
Referee: Jorge Larrionda (Uruguay)

| **Boca Juniors** | **Grêmio** |

| GK | 12 | (Argentina) Mauricio Caranta |
| CB | 4 | (Argentina) Hugo Ibarra | (yellow card) 13' |
| CB | 6 | (Argentina) Cata Díaz |
| CB | 3 | (Paraguay) Claudio Morel |
| RM | 14 | (Argentina) Rodrigo Palacio |
| CM | 8 | (Argentina) Pablo Ledesma |
| CM | 24 | (Argentina) Éver Banega | (yellow card) 34' | (substituted off) 81' |
| LM | 21 | (Argentina) Clemente Rodríguez |
| AM | 19 | (Argentina) Neri Cardozo | (yellow card) 64' | (substituted off) 67' |
| AM | 10 | (Argentina) Juan Román Riquelme | (yellow card) 53' |
| CF | 9 | (Argentina) Martín Palermo (c) |
Substitutes:
| GK | 25 | (Argentina) Pablo Migliore |
| DF | 2 | (Argentina) Matías Silvestre |
| MF | 5 | (Argentina) Sebastián Battaglia | | (substituted on) 81' |
| MF | 11 | (Argentina) Bruno Marioni |
| MF | 15 | (Argentina) Guillermo Marino |
| FW | 17 | (Argentina) Mauro Boselli |
| MF | 23 | (Argentina) Jesús Datolo | | (substituted on) 67' |
Manager:
(Argentina) Miguel Ángel Russo

| GK | 1 | (Argentina) Sebastián Saja |
| RB | 2 | (Brazil) Patrício | (yellow card) 15' |
| CB | 4 | (Brazil) William |
| CB | 14 | (Brazil) Teco |
| LB | 16 | (Brazil) Lúcio |
| DM | 15 | (Brazil) Sandro Goiano | (yellow card) 53' (yellow-red card) 58' |
| CM | 10 | (Brazil) Tcheco (c) | | (substituted off) 80' |
| CM | 22 | (Paraguay) Diego Gavilán |
| AM | 11 | (Brazil) Carlos Eduardo |
| CF | 9 | (Brazil) Tuta | | (substituted off) 72' |
| CF | 7 | (Brazil) Diego Souza |
Substitutes:
| GK | 12 | (Brazil) Galatto |
| DF | 3 | (Argentina) Rolando Schiavi |
| MF | 5 | (Brazil) Edmílson |
| DF | 6 | (Brazil) Bruno Teles |
| MF | 8 | (Brazil) Lucas Leiva | | (substituted on) 72' |
| MF | 18 | (Brazil) Ramón |
| FW | 20 | (Brazil) Douglas | | (substituted on) 80' |
Manager:
(Brazil) Mano Menezes

Man of the Match:
(Argentina) Juan Román Riquelme (Boca Juniors)

Assistant referees:
(Uruguay) Wálter Rial
(Uruguay) Edgardo Acosta
Fourth official:
(Uruguay) Líber Prudente

=== Second leg ===
20 June 2007
21:45 (UTC-3)
Second leg

| Grêmio (Brazil) | 0–2 | (Argentina) Boca Juniors |
|---|---|---|
| | Report | Riquelme 69', 81' |

Estádio Olímpico Monumental, Porto Alegre
Attendance: 51,851
Referee: Óscar Ruiz (Colombia)

| **Grêmio** | **Boca Juniors** |

| GK | 1 | (Argentina) Sebastián Saja |
| RB | 2 | (Brazil) Patrício |
| CB | 4 | (Brazil) William |
| CB | 14 | (Brazil) Teco | | (substituted off) 35' |
| LB | 16 | (Brazil) Lúcio | (yellow card) 88' |
| DM | 8 | (Brazil) Lucas Leiva | (yellow card) 70' |
| CM | 10 | (Brazil) Tcheco (c) | | (substituted off) 46' |
| CM | 22 | (Paraguay) Diego Gavilán |
| AM | 11 | (Brazil) Carlos Eduardo |
| CF | 9 | (Brazil) Tuta | | (substituted off) 70' |
| CF | 7 | (Brazil) Diego Souza | (yellow card) 50' |
Substitutes:
| GK | 12 | (Brazil) Galatto |
| DF | 3 | (Argentina) Rolando Schiavi | (yellow card) 84' | (substituted on) 35' |
| DF | 6 | (Brazil) Bruno Teles |
| MF | 18 | (Brazil) Ramón |
| FW | 19 | (Brazil) Everton | | (substituted on) 70' |
| FW | 20 | (Brazil) Douglas |
| FW | 21 | (Brazil) Amoroso | | (substituted on) 46' |
Manager:
(Brazil) Mano Menezes

| GK | 12 | (Argentina) Mauricio Caranta |
| CB | 4 | (Argentina) Hugo Ibarra |
| CB | 6 | (Argentina) Cata Díaz |
| CB | 3 | (Paraguay) Claudio Morel |
| RM | 14 | (Argentina) Rodrigo Palacio | | (substituted off) 87' |
| CM | 8 | (Argentina) Pablo Ledesma | (yellow card) 74' |
| CM | 24 | (Argentina) Éver Banega | | (substituted off) 82' |
| LM | 21 | (Argentina) Clemente Rodríguez |
| AM | 19 | (Argentina) Neri Cardozo | | (substituted off) 59' |
| AM | 10 | (Argentina) Juan Román Riquelme |
| CF | 9 | (Argentina) Martín Palermo (c) |
Substitutes:
| GK | 25 | (Argentina) Pablo Migliore |
| DF | 2 | (Argentina) Matías Silvestre |
| MF | 5 | (Argentina) Sebastián Battaglia | | (substituted on) 59' |
| FW | 11 | (Argentina) Bruno Marioni |
| MF | 16 | (Uruguay) Sergio Órteman | | (substituted on) 82' |
| FW | 17 | (Argentina) Mauro Boselli | | (substituted on) 87' |
| MF | 23 | (Argentina) Jesús Dátolo |
Manager:
(Argentina) Miguel Ángel Russo

Man of the Match:
(Argentina) Juan Román Riquelme (Boca Juniors)

Assistant referees:
(Colombia) Juan Carlos Bedoya
(Colombia) Jovani Zapata
Fourth official:
(Colombia) Albert Duarte

== Aftermath ==
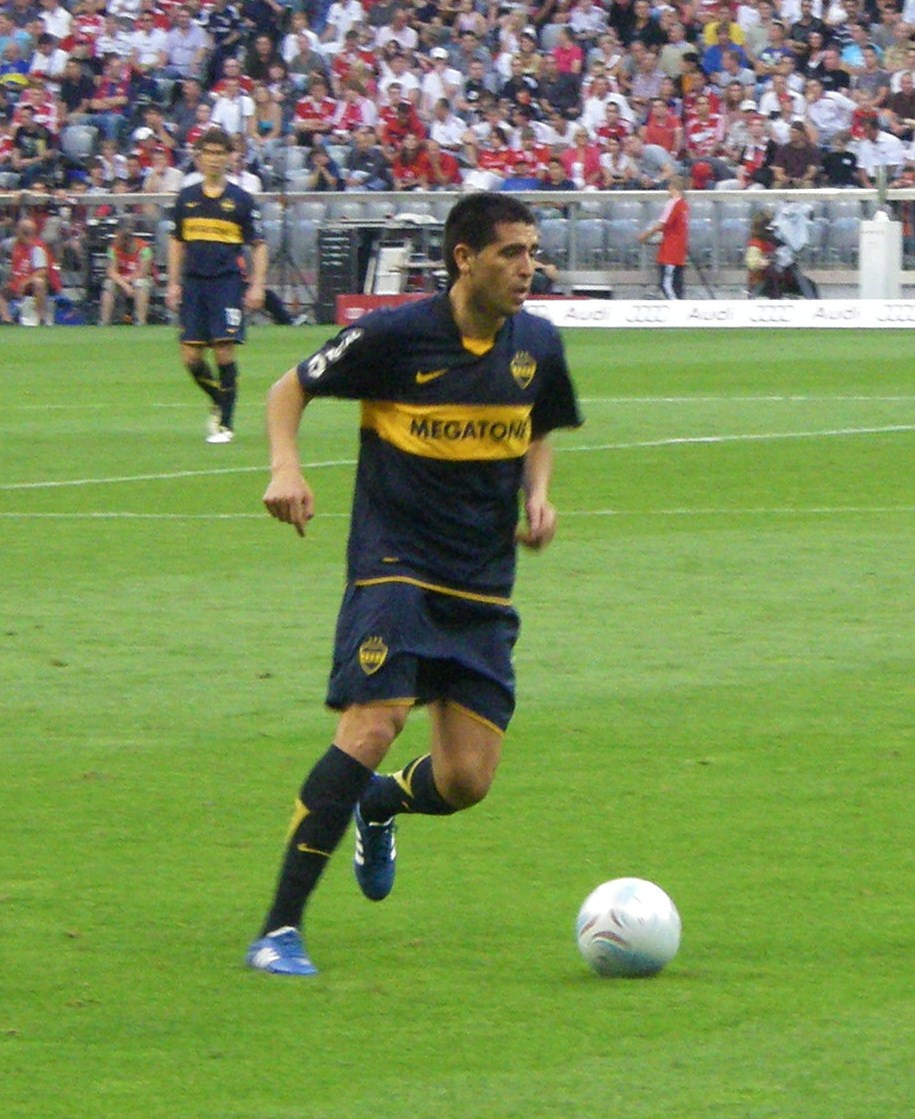
Juan Román Riquelme was the most notable player of the competition, with 8 goals and 7 assists

With this appearance in the last stage Boca Juniors reached a record-equalling ninth final, winning on five of the eight previous occasions. At that point only Peñarol of Uruguay had played as many. The media praised Juan Román Riquelme's performance in the finals, crediting him as Boca's most notable player. Riquelme had returned to Argentina after a frustrating experience at Spanish club Villarreal where manager Manuel Pellegrini excluded him from the senior squad due to personal disputes. Under the guidance of manager Miguel Ángel Russo, Riquelme was the top scorer of the team (and second of the 2007 edition behind Salvador Cabañas) with 8 goals in 11 matches, three of them in the finals.

Riquelme made it easy to win the Copa Libertadores

— Sergio Orteman, Riquelme's teammate in 2007

The (Libertadores) Cup is like the girl you want but she ignores you

— Miguel Ángel Russo, Boca Juniors manager

The 5–0 aggregate score remains the largest victory in the history of Copa Libertadores finals.

On the other hand, Grêmio – who had previously played three finals, winning two of them – moved up to second place among Brazilian clubs with most Copa Libertadores finals contested, behind São Paulo with six.
