= Batalha dos Aflitos =

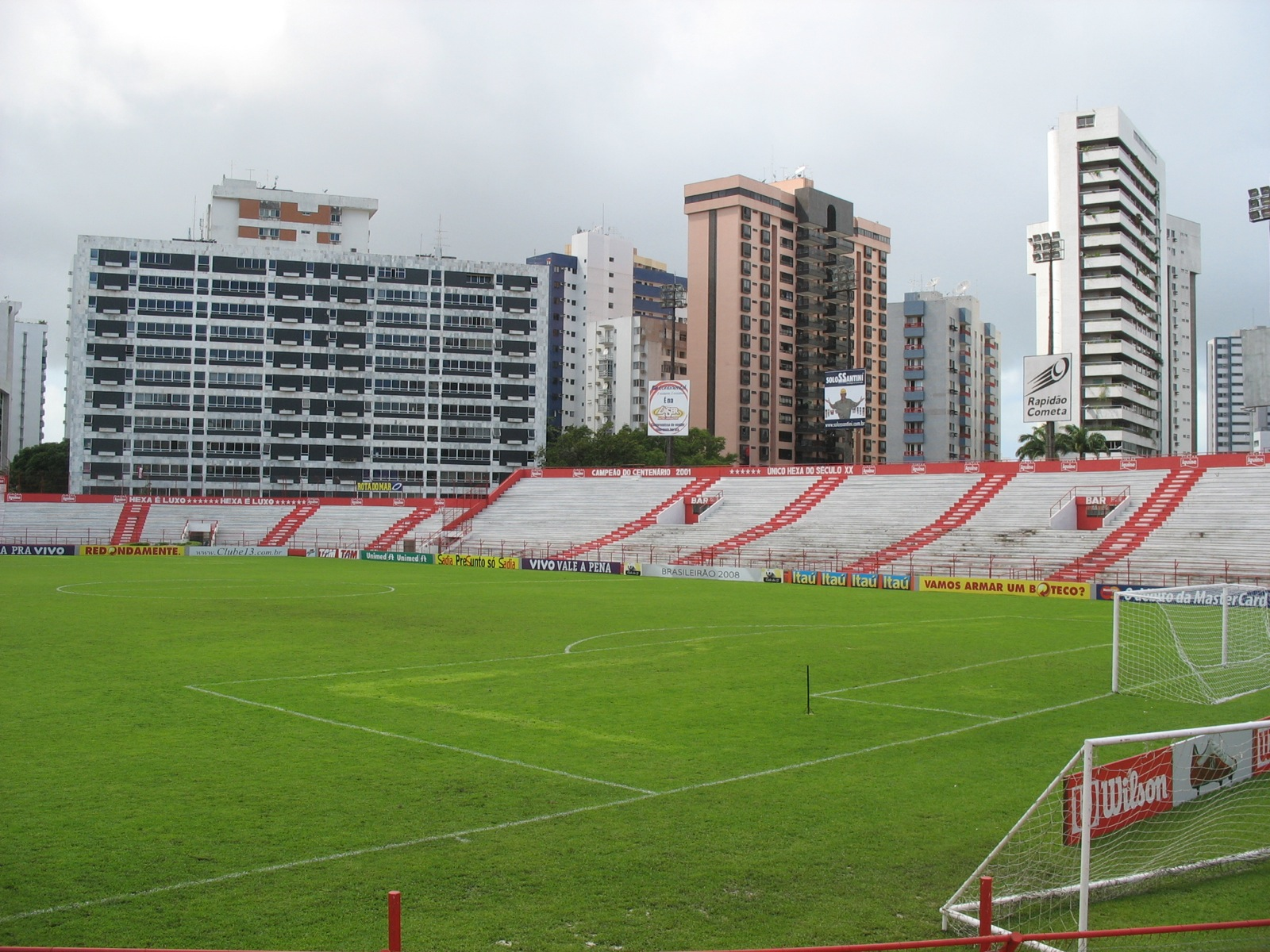
- Estádio dos Aflitos in 2008
- Event: 2005 Campeonato Brasileiro Série B – Play-offs
Náutico	Grêmio
0	1
- Date: 26 November 2005
- Venue: Estádio dos Aflitos, Recife, Pernambuco
- Referee: Djalma Beltrami
- Attendance: 29,891

The Batalha dos Aflitos (English: Battle of the Worried) is a name used by the Brazilian press to refer to a memorable and completely atypical Campeonato Brasileiro Série B play-off match played on 26 November, 2005 between Náutico and Grêmio. The name, Batalha dos Aflitos, is a play on words, where Aflitos both refers to Náutico's stadium, Estádio dos Aflitos, where the match was played, and the literal meaning of the word, which translates to "worried", reflecting the state of both clubs before and during the game.

The eventual winners of the match, Grêmio, would be champions of that year's Série B and promoted to the 2006 Campeonato Brasileiro Série A as a result.

== Background ==
In 2005, Grêmio, part of Brazil's 12 largest teams, was going through one of the worst periods of its history, in serious risk of ceasing operations due to an ever impending bankruptcy, and playing in the second division of Brazilian football, after being relegated in 2004's Série A. The worst fear for the team directors was not being promoted back to the country's top flight, implying such an occurrence would mean the team being forced to close.

During the 2005 Série B, the club passed through the first stage of the tournament oscillating at times, getting the 4th place, however the performance during second stage of the tournament was superior, with the team achieving the classification for the tournament final's stage, where 4 of the best teams played against each other in a round-robin group, with the two best teams getting promoted. The final match would be against Náutico, in an away match to be played in Recife's Estádio dos Aflitos, where Grêmio could tie and still get that result, putting pressure on the home team which needed to win to get promoted.

Before this match, Grêmio led the group with 9 points, in front of Santa Cruz with 7 points, Náutico with 6 points and Portuguesa with 5 points.

== Summary ==
The first half of the game did not have many good chances for goals for either side of the match, with Náutico in the attack most of the time but not being especially dangerous, and Grêmio being in defense most of the time, but still being able to show some danger, such as in the 16th minute of the game where a free kick almost resulted in an own goal. However, in the 32nd minute, a cross from Kuki into Grêmio's area resulted in Paulo Matos being knocked to the ground by Domingos and a penalty being conceded to the home team. Bruno Carvalho went to take the kick, but hit the post, meaning Grêmio was achieving its goal, keeping the tie at 0–0 and getting promoted to the first division.

The second half saw Náutico still trying to win the game, but being unable to pass through Grêmio's defenses, even after left-back Alejandro Escalona was sent off in the 60th minute. However, in the 65th minute, another penalty kick was awarded to Náutico due to a handball from defensive midfielder Nunes, causing Grêmio's players to explode in outrage due to the supposedly unfair decision. This resulted in referee Djalma Beltrami sending off Nunes and Patrício after being attacked by both, only worsening the situation in the field, with the Pernambuco police force entering the field to try and control the situation, but to no avail. During the next 25 minutes, the match did not resume, within that time still having the expulsion of Domingos, who threw away the ball from Beltrami's hand. This left the visiting team with only 7 players in the match – the bare minimum for a football match.

The penalty kick, taken by left-back Ademar, was saved by Grêmio goalkeeper Galatto, sending the ball to a corner kick. In the ensuing corner kick, Náutico, completely taken aback by the penalty kick just lost, allowed a counter-attack and the decisive goal to be scored by Anderson in the 106th minute of the match, even with only 7 players. With the result from the other match (Santa Cruz 2 × 1 Portuguesa), Grêmio won the tournament and got promoted to the country's top flight, while Náutico was left behind in the Série B.

== Details ==
26 November 2005
16:00 UTC−03

Náutico	0–1	Grêmio
	Report; Report	Anderson 90+16'

Estádio dos Aflitos, Recife
Attendance: 29,891
Referee: Djalma Beltrami

Náutico	Grêmio

GK	1	(Brazil) Rodolpho
RB	2	(Brazil) Bruno Carvalho	(yellow card) 15'	(substituted off) 59'
CB	3	(Brazil) Tuca
CB	4	(Brazil) Batata (c)	(yellow card) 67' (yellow-red card) 90+15'
LB	6	(Brazil) Ademar
DM	5	(Brazil) Tozo	(yellow card) 43'	(substituted off) 90+13'
RM	8	(Brazil) Cleisson
CM	7	(Brazil) David		(substituted off) 71'
LM	10	(Brazil) Danilo Cruz
CF	9	(Brazil) Paulo Matos	(yellow card) 55'
CF	11	(Brazil) Kuki
Substitutes:
GK	12	(Brazil) Dida
DF	13	(Brazil) Ricardo Henrique
DF	14	(Brazil) Aldivan
MF	15	(Brazil) Luciano
FW	16	(Brazil) Betinho		(substituted in) 90+13'
FW	17	(Brazil) Miltinho		(substituted in) 59'
FW	18	(Brazil) Romualdo		(substituted in) 71'
Manager:
(Brazil) Roberto Cavalo

GK	1	(Brazil) Galatto
RB	2	(Brazil) Patrício	(red card) 80'
CB	4	(Brazil) Pereira	(yellow card) 61'
CB	3	(Brazil) Domingos	(yellow card) 32' (red card) 80'
LB	6	(Chile) Alejandro Escalona	(yellow card) 12' (yellow-red card) 78'
DM	8	(Brazil) Sandro Goiano (c)
DM	5	(Brazil) Nunes	(red card) 80'
AM	11	(Brazil) Marcel	(yellow card) 80'	(substituted off) 60'
AM	10	(Brazil) Marcelo Costa
CF	7	(Brazil) Ricardinho		(substituted off) 46'
CF	9	(Uruguay) Marcelo Lipatín		(substituted off) 90+13'
Substitutes:
GK	12	(Brazil) Marcelo Grohe
DF	13	(Brazil) Marcelo Oliveira		(substituted in) 90+13'
DF	14	(Brazil) Alessandro
MF	15	(Brazil) Lucas Leiva		(substituted in) 46'
MF	16	(Brazil) Marco Aurélio
MF	17	(Brazil) Anderson		(substituted in) 60'
FW	18	(Brazil) Samuel
Manager:
(Brazil) Mano Menezes

=== Curiosities ===
- Anderson, the scorer of the winning goal, was noticed by FC Porto of Portugal and then spent seven and a half seasons at Manchester United.
- Lucas Leiva, another of Grêmio's second-half substitutes, also played in the Premier League for Liverpool.
- Unused substitute Alessandro won the FIFA Club World Cup as captain of Corinthians in 2012.
- Grêmio's coach Mano Menezes became the manager of the Brazilian national team from 2010 to 2012.
- The game gathered such an iconic status among Grêmio fans that a documentary was made about it. "Inacreditável – A Batalha dos Aflitos" was released in 2007 and tells the story of that year's championship, giving a good deal of emphasis on the 71 seconds between Náutico's second penalty and the decisive goal.
