= Batata (footballer, born 1973) =

Brazilian footballer

Personal information
- Full name: Wanderley Gonçalves Barbosa
- Date of birth: 26 November 1973 (age 52)
- Place of birth: Barra do Piraí, Brazil
- Height: 1.83 m (6 ft 0 in)
- Position: Centre-back

Senior career*
Years	Team	Apps	(Gls)
1992	Inter de Limeira		
1993–1994	Ituano		
1993	→ Remo (loan)		
1994–1995	Monterrey		
1995–1998	Ituano		
1998–2002	Corinthians	101	(5)
2002	Atlético Mineiro		
2002	Brasiliense		
2003–2006	Náutico		
2006	Pogoń Szczecin	5	(0)
2007	Central		
2008	Salgueiro		
- * Club domestic league appearances and goals

Wanderley Gonçalves Barbosa (born 26 November 1973), better known as Batata, is a Brazilian former professional footballer who played as a centre-back.

== Career ==
Batata began his career at Inter de Limeira, and shortly after arrived at Ituano. In 1993, on loan to Remo, he was state champion of Pará. He had a brief spell at Monterrey, but returned to Ituano, where he remained until 1998. He was signed by Corinthians and formed a defensive partnership with Carlos Gamarra in the 1998 and 1999 Brazilian titles, in addition to other achievements as a substitute. Played by several other teams after leaving Corinthians, with emphasis on Náutico, where he was state champion and was part of the match against Grêmio in 2005 Campeonato Brasileiro Série B that became known as "Batalha dos Aflitos".

== Honours ==
Remo

- Campeonato Paraense: 1993

Corinthians

- Campeonato Brasileiro: 1998, 1999
- FIFA Club World Cup: 2000
- Campeonato Paulista: 1999, 2001
- Torneio Rio-São Paulo: 2002
- Copa do Brasil: 2002

Náutico

- Campeonato Pernambucano: 2004
