= Tuca (footballer) =

Brazilian footballer (born 1981)

Personal information
- Full name: Juliano Francisco de Paula
- Date of birth: 9 August 1981 (age 45)
- Place of birth: Bom Despacho, Minas Gerais, Brazil
- Height: 1.88 m (6 ft 2 in)
- Position: Defender

Team information
- Current team: Al-Hidd

Senior career*
Years	Team	Apps	(Gls)
2004	Chapecoense		
2005	Náutico		
2006	Sport		
2006–2010	Al Muharraq		
2010–	Al-Hidd		
- * Club domestic league appearances and goals as of 9 October 2010

Juliano Francisco de Paula, known as Tuca, (born 9 August 1981) is a Brazilian football defender who played in Brazil, Bahrain and the United Arab Emirates.

Tuca signed with Chapecoense in 2003, leaving to join Náutico in 2005. In November 2005 he played in a Campeonato Brasileiro Série B playoff match between Náutico Grêmio, which later became known as the Battle of Aflitos.
