= Paulo Matos =

Brazilian footballer

Personal information
- Full name: Paulo Gomes de Matos
- Date of birth: 25 January 1984 (age 42)
- Place of birth: Riachão do Jacuípe, Brazil
- Position: Forward

Senior career*
Years	Team	Apps	(Gls)
2001–2002	Juventude		
2002–2005	São Paulo	7	(2)
2005	Náutico		
2006	Vitória		
2007	Gama		
2008	América-RN		
2009	Criciúma		
2009	Confiança	1	(0)
2010	Mixto		
2011	Paraná	3	(0)
2011	Goianésia	10	(0)
2012	Jacuipense		
2014–2015	Estrela do Norte	7	(1)
2015–2016	Al Ansar	11	(2)
2016	Formiga		
- * Club domestic league appearances and goals

Paulo Gomes de Matos (born 25 January 1984) is a Brazilian former footballer who played as a forward.

== Career ==
On 19 June 2005, Matos debuted for São Paulo alongside future Brazil international Hernanes, scoring in a 1–0 win against Botafogo. After his retirement, he would regard that moment as the best in his career.

On 26 November 2005, Matos played for Náutico in that year's Série B promotion play-off final against Grêmio; the match was dubbed the Batalha dos Aflitos, and was played at the Estádio dos Aflitos. During the match, Náutico received two penalties, and Grêmio had four players with red cards, yet Gremio won 1–0. After that game, Matos became depressed, barely slept or ate, did not speak to anybody for two weeks, and vowed to never to go near that stadium again.
