= Mano Menezes =

Brazilian football manager

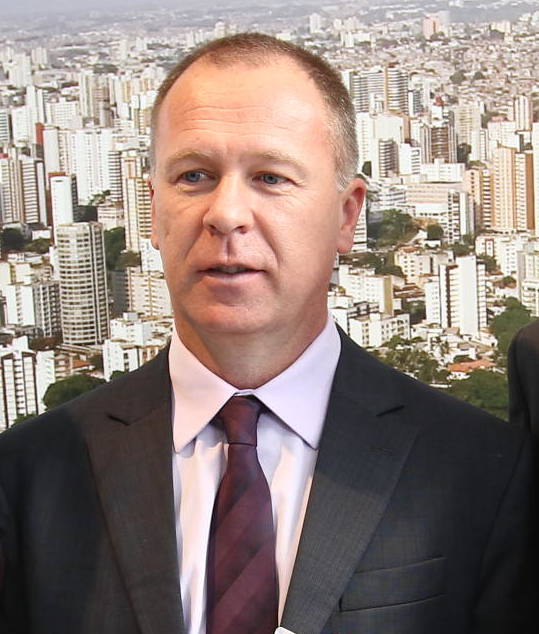
- Menezes in 2011

Personal information
- Full name: Luiz Antônio Venker Menezes
- Date of birth: 11 June 1962 (age 64)
- Place of birth: Rio Pardo, Rio Grande do Sul, Brazil
- Position: Centre-back

Team information
- Current team: Peru (head coach)

Senior career*
Years	Team	Apps	(Gls)
1989–1991	Guarani-VA		

Managerial career
- 1993–1996: Guarani-VA U20
- 1997: Guarani-VA
- 1999: Guarani-VA
- 2000–2001: Internacional U17
- 2002: Internacional U20
- 2002: Guarani-VA
- 2002: Brasil de Pelotas
- 2003: Guarani-VA
- 2003: Iraty
- 2004: 15 de Novembro
- 2004–2005: Caxias
- 2005–2007: Grêmio
- 2008–2010: Corinthians
- 2010–2012: Brazil
- 2012: Brazil U23
- 2013: Flamengo
- 2014: Corinthians
- 2015: Cruzeiro
- 2016: Shandong Luneng
- 2016–2019: Cruzeiro
- 2019: Palmeiras
- 2020: Bahia
- 2021: Al Nassr
- 2022–2023: Internacional
- 2023–2024: Corinthians
- 2024–2025: Fluminense
- 2025: Grêmio
- 2026–: Peru
- * Club domestic league appearances and goals

Luiz Antônio Venker Menezes (born 11 June 1962), known as Mano Menezes, is a Brazilian professional football manager who is the head coach of the Peru national team.

Menezes managed the Brazil national team from July 2010 until his sacking in November 2012. His nickname comes from his early childhood, when his sister used to call him "Mano", which means "Hand" in portuguese.

== Early life and playing career ==
Menezes was born in Passo do Sobrado, Rio Grande do Sul, and started playing football at amateur hometown side EC Rosário, a club which his father was president at the time; initially a forward, he was later sent back to the midfield before establishing himself as a centre-back. He subsequently played for local sides Fluminense de Mato Leitão and Guarani de Venâncio Aires, helping the latter to win the 1988 Campeonato Gaúcho de Futebol Amador and playing in the Campeonato Gaúcho Segunda Divisão in the following years. After three more years playing, he retired to become a coach.

== Coaching career ==
=== Early years ===
After retiring, Menezes was an assistant of Guarani's under-20 team in 1992, before taking over as head coach of the side in the following year. He was named head coach of the first team ahead of the 1997 season, but was sacked and spent a period of observation with Paulo Autuori at Cruzeiro; he returned to Guarani in 1999, being again dismissed.

In 2000, Menezes was named coach of Internacional's under-17 team, and returned to Guarani in 2002 after a short period with Inter's under-20 team. He led the club to the first position in the second round of the 2002 Campeonato Gaúcho and to the subsequent final win over São Gabriel; the title, however, was given to Internacional after a final stage was introduced. He later had a short spell at Brasil de Pelotas in the second division of the Gauchão.

Menezes returned to Guarani for a fourth spell as head coach in 2003, but left after having altercations with the squad. He then spent three months in charge of Iraty, as the club finished last of their group in the 2003 Série C.

=== 15 de Novembro and Caxias ===
Ahead of the 2004 season, Menezes was named head coach of 15 de Novembro. He led the club to the semifinals of the 2004 Copa do Brasil, defeating Vasco da Gama in the process, and subsequently took over Série B side Caxias in June of that year.

=== Grêmio ===
On 22 April 2005, Menezes named head coach of Grêmio in the second division. He led the club to a promotion to the Série A as champions in a match that became known as Batalha dos Aflitos, and also won the 2006 Campeonato Gaúcho with the club.

Menezes qualified the Tricolor to the 2007 Copa Libertadores, where they lost the finals to Boca Juniors. He also won the year's Gauchão before announcing that he would depart the club at the end of the season on 28 November 2007.

=== Corinthians ===
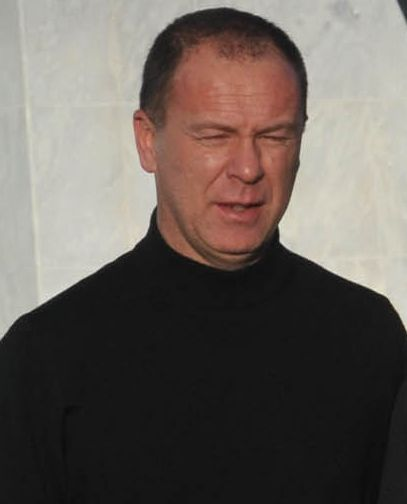
Menezes in 2009

On 4 December 2007, Menezes agreed to become head coach of Corinthians for the upcoming campaign. In his first year, he led the club to the Copa do Brasil finals, losing to Sport Recife, and achieved promotion from division two, again as champions.

In the 2009 season, Menezes' side lifted the Campeonato Paulista and the Copa do Brasil, qualifying the club to the 2010 Copa Libertadores. On 2 July of that year, he renewed his contract until the end of 2010.

=== Brazil national team ===
On 24 July 2010, the Brazilian Football Confederation (CBF) announced that Menezes would replace Dunga as head coach of the Brazil national team. His appointment was generally well received, although some pointed out that his favoured playing style resembled Dunga's defensive style. He coached his first Brazil match on 10 August, a 2–0 win against the United States, where he introduced new players such as Diego Tardelli, André and David Luiz, and with only four players that had participated in the 2010 FIFA World Cup in South Africa: Dani Alves, Ramires, Thiago Silva and Robinho, as well as 2010 World Cup cuts Alexandre Pato, Marcelo and Neymar.

At the 2011 Copa América, Brazil went out in the quarter-finals on penalties to Paraguay after a 0–0 draw, with Brazil missing all the four of its penalties. He was also the coach of the Olympic team at London 2012, hoping to win the long-awaited gold medal for Brazil, the only accolade Brazil had not won in football. However, they were defeated by Mexico in the Olympic final and Menezes was the target of criticism in Brazil.

Following disappointing results, Menezes was sacked on 23 November 2012.

=== Flamengo ===
On 13 June 2013, Menezes was named as the new head coach of Flamengo. On 19 September, he resigned following a 4–2 home loss to Atlético Paranaense.

=== Corinthians return ===
On 11 December 2013, Menezes returned to Corinthians in the place of Tite. After helping the club to a fourth-place league finish, as well as qualifying to the Copa Libertadores, he resigned on 6 December 2014, being subsequently succeeded by his antecessor Tite.

=== Cruzeiro ===
On 1 September 2015, after nine months without a club, Menezes was named Cruzeiro head coach. He led the side on 15 matches, with only one loss, but left on 6 December after Chinese club Shandong Luneng Taishan paid his R$ 7 million release clause.

=== Shandong Luneng ===
Menezes was presented at Shandong Luneng Taishan of the Chinese Super League on 12 December 2015. On 21 April of the following year, with a 1–0 victory over Japanese side Sanfrecce Hiroshima, the club returned to the knockout stage of the AFC Champions League after an 11-year absence, with one round of the group stage in advance.

On 25 May 2016, Shandong Luneng defeated Sydney FC, entering the quarter-finals of the AFC Champions League, which was the best result for the team in the ACL. In contrast to the excellent performance in continental competition, Shandong fell into the relegation zone in domestic league. On 7 June 2016, the club announced that Menezes had resigned for personal reasons and he was no longer the manager of the team. He was replaced by former FC Bayern Munich and VfL Wolfsburg manager Felix Magath.

=== Cruzeiro return ===
On 26 July 2016, Menezes was announced back at Cruzeiro. He won the 2017 and 2018 editions of the national cup, and the 2018 and 2019 editions of the Campeonato Mineiro with the club.

On 8 August 2019, Menezes was sacked from the Raposa; the club ultimately suffered relegation at the end of the season.

=== Palmeiras ===
On 3 September 2019, Menezes was announced at Palmeiras on a contract until December 2021; his signature was widely rejected by the club's supporters due to his identification with their rivals Corinthians. He debuted fifteen days later, with a win over Goiás.

On 1 December 2019, Menezes was dismissed from Verdão following a loss to Flamengo.

=== Bahia ===
On 8 September 2020, Menezes was named head coach of Bahia in the top tier, agreeing to a contract until the end of 2021. On 20 December, after a 3–4 away loss against former side Flamengo, he was sacked.

=== Al Nassr ===
On 9 April 2021, Menezes was appointed as the manager of Saudi club Al Nassr. On 19 September 2021, he was sacked after a 1–3 loss against Ittihad.

=== Internacional ===
On 19 April 2022, Menezes was appointed head coach of Internacional back in his home country. He was sacked on 17 July of the following year, after a 0–0 draw against Palmeiras.

=== Third spell at Corinthians ===
On 28 September 2023, Menezes returned to Corinthians, replacing sacked Vanderlei Luxemburgo. He was himself dismissed on 5 February of the following year, after a 3–1 defeat to Novorizontino which saw the club drop into the relegation zone of the 2024 Campeonato Paulista.

=== Fluminense ===
On 1 July 2024, Menezes was named head coach of Fluminense until the end of the year. He managed to avoid relegation with the side, but was dismissed on 30 March of the following year, after a 2–0 defeat to Fortaleza on the opening round of the 2025 Série A.

=== Grêmio return ===
On 21 April 2025, Menezes was announced as head coach of Grêmio on a contract until the end of the year; the announcement occurred exactly 20 years after the beginning of his first spell. On 9 December, the club announced his departure.

=== Peru ===
On 29 January 2026, Menezes was appointed as head coach of the Peru national team on a four-year contract.

== Managerial statistics ==
As of 13 November 2026

Managerial record by team and tenure
Team	From	To	Record				
Team	From	To	P	W	D	L	Win %
Guarani-VA	10 January 1997	22 May 2002	103	42	28	33	40.8
Brasil de Pelotas	23 May 2002	30 December 2002	8	5	1	2	62.5
Guarani-VA	1 January 2003	30 March 2003	28	12	7	9	42.9
Iraty	1 April 2003	30 December 2003	6	1	1	4	16.7
15 de Novembro	31 December 2003	22 June 2004	44	20	11	13	45.5
Caxias	23 June 2004	20 April 2005	29	15	6	8	51.7
Grêmio	21 April 2005	31 December 2007	169	89	35	45	52.7
Corinthians	1 January 2008	25 July 2010	177	97	49	31	54.8
Brazil	26 July 2010	23 November 2012	33	21	6	6	63.6
Brazil U23	2012	2012	7	6	0	1	85.7
Flamengo	13 June 2013	19 September 2013	22	9	6	7	40.9
Corinthians	1 January 2014	31 December 2014	61	31	15	15	50.8
Cruzeiro	1 September 2015	31 December 2015	16	8	6	2	50.0
Shandong Luneng	1 January 2016	7 June 2016	22	8	7	7	36.4
Cruzeiro	27 July 2016	9 August 2019	211	101	60	50	47.9
Palmeiras	7 September 2019	2 December 2019	20	11	5	4	55.0
Bahia	11 September 2020	20 December 2020	24	8	2	14	33.3
Al-Nassr	9 April 2021	20 September 2021	16	9	3	4	56.3
Internacional	18 April 2022	17 July 2023	81	39	29	13	48.1
Corinthians	28 September 2023	5 February 2024	19	6	5	8	31.6
Fluminense	1 July 2024	30 March 2025	46	20	13	13	43.5
Grêmio	21 April 2025	9 December 2025	42	14	14	14	33.3
Peru	29 January 2026	Present	9	2	2	5	22.2
Total			1,190	573	310	307	48.2

== Honors ==
Manager
Grêmio

- Campeonato Brasileiro Série B: 2005
- Campeonato Gaúcho: 2006, 2007
- Recopa Gaúcha: 2025

Corinthians

- Campeonato Brasileiro Série B: 2008
- Campeonato Paulista: 2009
- Copa do Brasil: 2009

Cruzeiro

- Copa do Brasil: 2017, 2018
- Campeonato Mineiro: 2018, 2019

== See also ==
- List of football managers with the most matches
- List of Brazil national football team managers
