= Kuki (footballer, born 1971) =

Brazilian footballer and coach

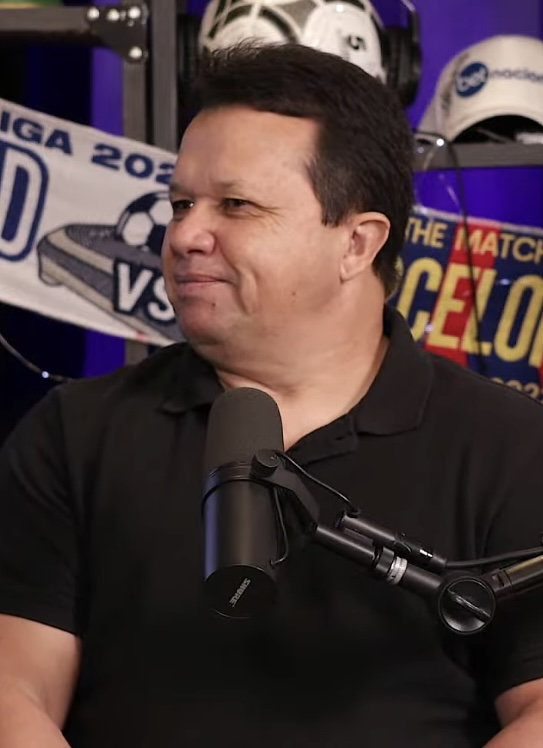
- Kuki in 2023.

Personal information
- Full name: Sílvio Luiz Borba da Silva
- Date of birth: April 30, 1971 (age 55)
- Place of birth: Crateús, Brazil
- Position: Forward

Senior career*
Years	Team	Apps	(Gls)
1993	Encantado		
1993	Taquariense		
1994	Encantado		
1996	Ypiranga (RS)		
1996	Veranópolis		
1997	Ypiranga (RS)		
1997	Palmeirense		
1997–1998	Lajeadense		
1999	Grêmio Santanense		
2000	Inter de Lages		
2000	Brusque		
2001–2002	Náutico	93	(59)
2002	Jeonbuk	27	(17)
2003–2007	Náutico	240	(112)
2007	Santa Cruz	22	(7)
2008–2009	Náutico	54	(13)

Managerial career
- 2010: Náutico (assistant manager)
- * Club domestic league appearances and goals

Sílvio Luiz Borba da Silva, usually known as Kuki (born April 30, 1971, in Crateús, Ceará), is a Brazilian retired association footballer who played forward and a head coach. Kuki is the third-highest goalscorer and is considered the greatest idol of Clube Náutico Capibaribe.

== Early life ==
Kuki was born in Crateús, in the state of Ceará, and at seven months of age he moved with his family to Roca Sales, in the state of Rio Grande do Sul. There, he was raised by his grandmother Irene, who gave him the nickname ‘Kuki,’ which is a corruption of the word ‘Cookie.’

At the age of 16, he traveled to Porto Alegre to take a trial in an attempt to join the youth teams of Grêmio; however, he was rejected by the club’s director. Being turned down by Grêmio left him disappointed. Later, Kuki returned to football with Esporte Clube Encantado at the age of 23, playing in the 1993 Gaúcho Championship.

== Playing career ==
=== Náutico ===
Kuki made his professional debut for Náutico on 21 January 2001, at the age of 28. He quickly established himself as a decisive player, scoring his first official goal later that year and playing a key role in Náutico’s victory in the Pernambucano Championship during the club’s centenary season, for which he was named the tournament’s breakthrough player. In the Brazilian Series B, he also gained prominence alongside Carlinhos Bala, as Náutico finished third. In the same year Kuki was the second-highest scorer in the Brazilian Séries B with 14 goals.

==== 2002 ====
In 2002, Kuki contributed to Náutico’s second consecutive state championship, scoring important goals in derby matches. In December of that year, Kuki accepted an offer to transfer to Jeonbuk Hyundai Motors FC, from South Korea, for approximately US$200,000. Initially, Kuki had demanded US$500,000, but the final agreement was reached for the lower amount.

Playing for Jeonbuk, Kuki finished as joint top scorer of the K League in 2002, alongside Leomar Leiria.

==== 2003 ====
Kuki returned to Náutico in 2003 and again ended the state championship as top scorer. Kuki began the season helping the club reach the finals of both the Copa Pernambuco and the Campeonato Pernambucano. However, during the knockout stage of the state championship, in a heated Clássico das Emoções (Derby Of The Emotions) against Santa Cruz, Náutico lost 3–0 at home. During the match, Kuki argued with defender Sílvio and left the stadium visibly angry. Later, he was fined by the club’s board for unsportsmanlike conduct. Despite not winning the title that year, Kuki once again finished as the tournament’s top scorer. The season was marked by a serious traffic accident involving the player, which resulted in two fatalities. Deeply affected, Kuki was temporarily granted leave by the club. Despite the traumatic event, in the same year, Kuki stood out again in the Series B of the Brazilian football championship, finishing as the second-highest scorer with 13 goals, behind Vagner Love, who was playing for Palmeiras at the time.

==== 2004 ====
In 2004, he played a central role in Náutico’s third consecutive Campeonato Pernambucano title, scoring in multiple derby matches and reaffirming his status as one of the club’s leading figures. In August 2004, Náutico traveled to Brasília aiming to take the lead in the 2004 Campeonato Brasileiro Série B. Before facing Brasiliense, the then President of Brazil, Lula da Silva, a declared Náutico supporter, unexpectedly invited the entire squad to a meeting at the Palácio do Planalto and took photos with the players. That year, Kuki was also the top scorer in the Brazilian Series B, with 14 goals.

==== 2005 ====
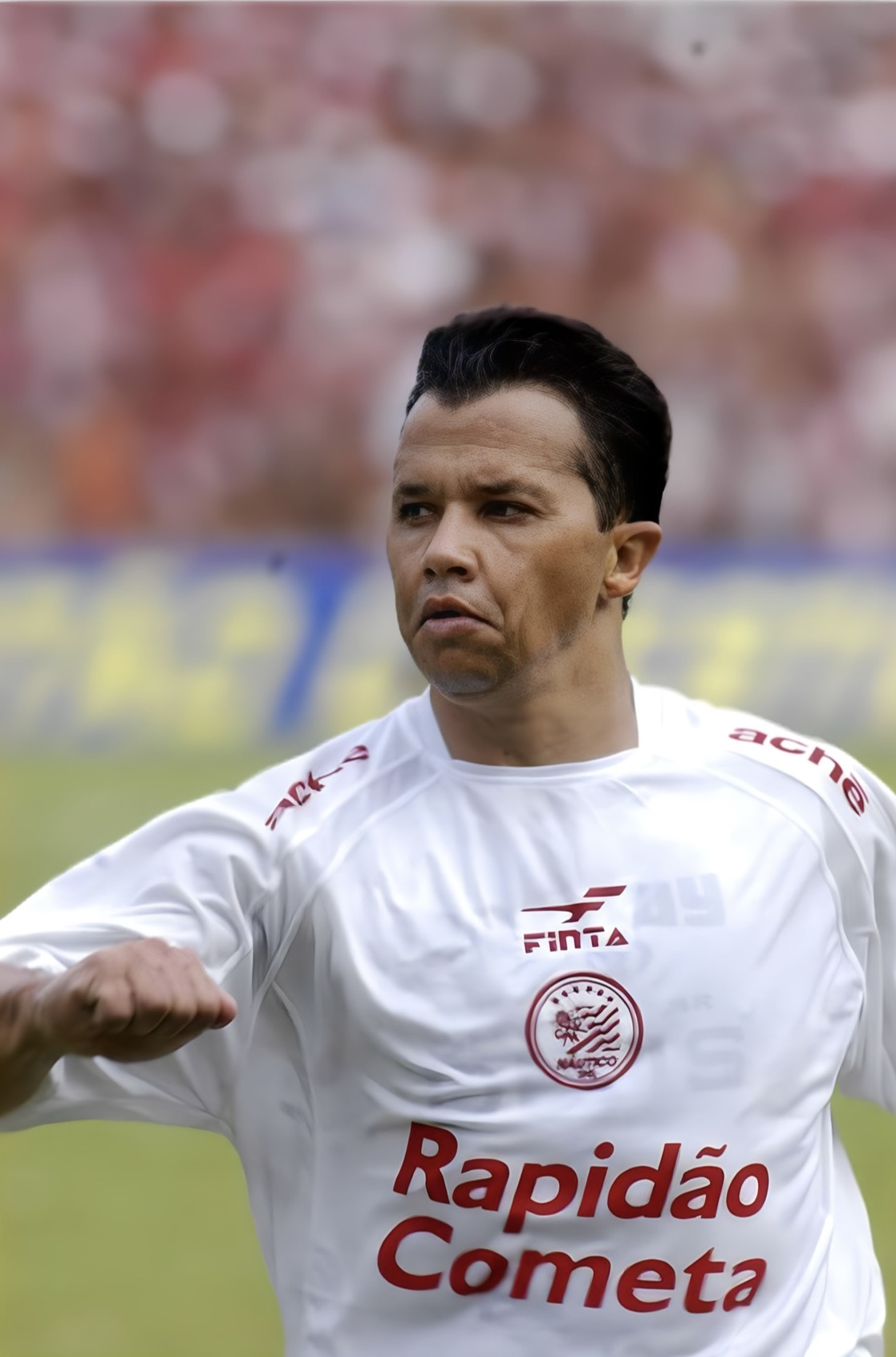
Kuki playing for Náutico in 2005.

In 2005, Kuki once again finished as the top scorer of the Campeonato Pernambucano, scoring 17 goals.

In the same year, Kuki took part in one of the most unusual and chaotic matches in Brazilian football history, the famous Batalha dos Aflitos, played on 26 November 2005 at Aflitos Stadium. The match remains vivid in the memory of many supporters and is surrounded by controversy and accusations of inaction directed at Kuki.

The match ended with a single goal scored by Grêmio and denied Náutico promotion.

==== 2006 ====
After the trauma of the Batalha dos Aflitos in 2005, in which Náutico dramatically missed promotion against Grêmio, Kuki remained with the squad and assumed a leadership role both on and off the field. With the arrival of new players and the retention of some veterans, the team was restructured, but Kuki continued to be its main technical and emotional reference.

During the 2006 Campeonato Brasileiro Série B, the forward played a decisive role. In the debut of head coach Paulo Campos, Kuki scored both goals in a 2–1 win over Ceará with the winning goal coming in the 49th minute of the second half.

Later, in September, he again scored twice in a 2–0 victory against Remo, a result that put Náutico at the top of the standings.

In the match that secured promotion, played in the penultimate round against Ituano, Kuki assisted the opening goal scored by Luís Carlos Capixaba. Náutico won 2–0 and mathematically confirmed their return to the top division of Brazilian football.

=== Santa Cruz ===
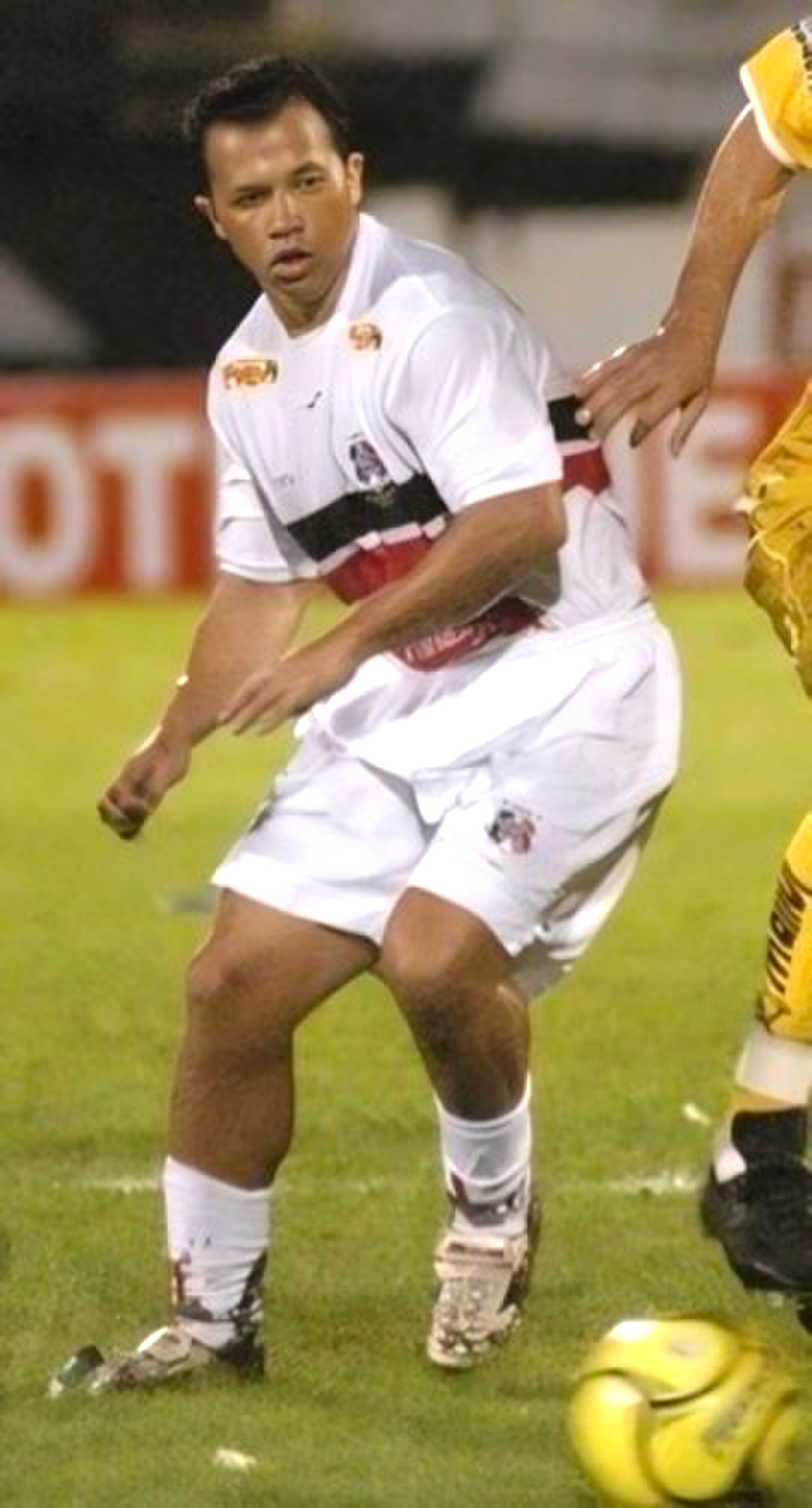
Kuki playing for Santa Cruz in 2007.

Kuki’s controversial spell with the arch-rival of Náutico, Santa Cruz, in 2007 took place after a conflict with Náutico’s own supporters. After being booed by the crowd during a disastrous 4–1 home defeat against Cruzeiro at Estádio Eládio de Barros Carvalho (Aflitos), Kuki became frustrated with Náutico’s fans and, weeks later, was loaned to Timbu’s rival, Santa Cruz. On 25 July 2007, Kuki was officially presented at Santa Cruz’s headquarters as a reinforcement for the club’s 2007 Série B campaign of the Campeonato Brasileiro.

Kuki scored his first goals for the club on 10 August 2007, in a 2–1 victory over Criciúma, at Estádio José do Rego Maciel (Arruda), where he scored both goals in the same match. Due to his previous strong performances at Náutico, Kuki inspired confidence among Santa Cruz supporters, even amid the club’s relegation to the third division and its subsequent elimination from the Copa do Brasil by Ulbra of Rondônia.

In total, Kuki scored 12 goals for Santa Cruz, with his final goal coming in a match against São Caetano, in which he chipped the goalkeeper to secure a draw for the Tricolor. Despite this, Santa Cruz, who were competing in Série B, were ultimately relegated. Náutico, meanwhile, managed to avoid relegation from Brazil’s top division. Following the demotion, Santa Cruz restructured its squad for 2008 and returned Kuki to Náutico. In January 2008, Kuki was reintegrated into the Timbu squad and re-established a strong relationship with the club, remaining there until his retirement in 2009.

== Post-retirement years ==
=== Politics ===
Kuki is an active member of the Brazilian Socialist Party. During 2020 Brazilian municipal elections, Kuki ran for the position of city councilor in Recife but was not elected.

=== Legacy ===
On 15 January 2019, Kuki, in partnership with journalist Marcelo Cavalcante, released an autobiography entitled Kuki: Raça Alvirrubra, The book recounts part of Kuki’s life story, covering his childhood and adolescence in the city of Roca Sales, in the countryside of Rio Grande do Sul. It describes his struggle to become a professional footballer, the hardships he faced in life, and his journey until arriving at Estádio dos Aflitos. The main focus of the book is the construction and strengthening of Kuki’s passion for Náutico, the club where he won three state championships and earned the devotion of the supporters.

On 26 May 2023, Náutico released a kit from its Idols Collection in honor of Kuki. The shirt, traditionally white, features red stripes on the sides and sleeves, and was inspired by the design used during the club’s back-to-back Pernambuco State Championship titles in 2002, when the former striker was one of the team’s standout players. In addition to the shirt, the club also paid tribute to its former top scorer in the locker rooms, converting one of the cabins into an exclusive space dedicated to Kuki at Aflitos stadium.

=== Health issues ===
On April 21, 2025, Kuki suffered an ischemic stroke. He was initially hospitalized at Restauração Hospital in Recife. He was later transferred to the Neurological Intensive Care Unit (ICU) of Royal Portuguese Hospital, where he received specialized treatment.

Kuki’s hospitalization mobilized fans and football clubs from Pernambuco. The main teams from Recife—Náutico, Sport, and Santa Cruz—launched a joint campaign on social media, sharing a Pix key to raise funds for his treatment. Santa Cruz organized a solidarity ticket initiative at Arruda Stadium and benefit matches with former players from the three clubs. Sport, in turn, expressed public support and made itself available to assist the family.

On May 9, 2025, Kuki recovered and was discharged from the hospital after 18 days of hospitalization. Kuki continues to receive physiotherapy and speech therapy treatments to this day.

== Personal life ==
Kuki is a descendant of Indigenous people from the Xavante tribe. He is married to Vanessa de Paula, with whom he has two children: Arthur (born in 2005) and Helena (born in 2025). Kuki has two tattoos: one on his right arm with the name of his son ‘Arthur’ and another on his right wrist reading ‘Helena,’ both in tribute to his two children.

== Honors ==
Kuki won the Campeonato Catarinense Second Level in 2000 with Internacional de Lages, and the Campeonato Pernambucano in 2001, 2002, and 2004 with Náutico.
