= Teco (footballer) =

Brazilian footballer

Personal information
- Full name: Wender Coelho da Silva
- Date of birth: August 11, 1982 (age 44) (age 40)
- Place of birth: Vila Velha, Brazil
- Height: 1.88 m (6 ft 2 in)
- Position: Central defender

Team information
- Current team: EC São José

Youth career
- 2001: Inter de Limeira

Senior career*
Years	Team	Apps	(Gls)
2002	Inter de Limeira	0	(0)
2003	Mirassol	60	(3)
2004	Estrela do Norte	85	(1)
2005	São Bento-SP	0	(0)
2005–2006	Ipatinga	12	(0)
2006	Cruzeiro	17	(1)
2007–2008	Grêmio	13	(1)
2009	Botafogo	3	(0)
2010	Atlético Goianiense	0	(0)
2011–2012	Brasiliense	11	(1)
2013	Juventude	0	(0)
2013	Central	8	(1)
2014	Monte Azul	11	(0)
2014	Concórdia	20	(1)
2015	São Paulo-RS	15	(2)
2015–2017	Brasil de Pelotas	49	(1)
2018–	EC São José	0	(0)
- * Club domestic league appearances and goals as of 13 March 2018

Wender Coelho da Silva (born August 11, 1982 in Vila Velha), or simply Teco, is a Brazilian central defender. He currently plays for EC São José.

== Career ==
Teco is currently recuperating from a serious knee injury in Gremio's 2-0 win over Fluminense on 20 May 2007, but has signed a 6-month loan extension with Gremio until June 2008. Gremio have been treating and paying for Teco's recovery and Cruzeiro have agreed to the deal because of this. At the end of his contract with Grêmio, Teco have returned to Cruzeiro.

== Honours ==
- Copa do Espírito Santo: 2004
- Campeonato Paulista Série A2: 2005
- Campeonato Gaúcho: 2007
