= Nunes (footballer, born 1984) =

Brazilian footballer

Personal information
- Full name: Eduardo Martins Nunes
- Date of birth: March 20, 1984 (age 42)
- Place of birth: Alegrete, Brazil
- Position: Defensive midfielder

Youth career
- 2003–2005: Grêmio

Senior career*
Years	Team	Apps	(Gls)
2005–2008	Grêmio	19	(0)
2008	→ Guarani (loan)	18	(2)
2009	Náutico		
2009–2010	Guarani	18	(1)
2010	Vila Nova	6	(0)
2010–2011	Pelotas		
2011	Red Bull Brasil		
2012–2013	Cerâmica		
2013	Avenida		
2013–2015	Brasil de Pelotas		
2016	Pelotas		
2017	Bento Gonçalves		
2018	Glória		
- * Club domestic league appearances and goals

Eduardo Martins Nunes (born March 20, 1984) or simply Nunes, is a Brazilian former professional footballer who played as a defensive midfielder.

== Honours ==
- Campeonato Brasileiro Série B: 2005
- Campeonato Gaúcho: 2006, 2007
