= Anderson (footballer, born 1988) =

Brazilian footballer (born 1988)

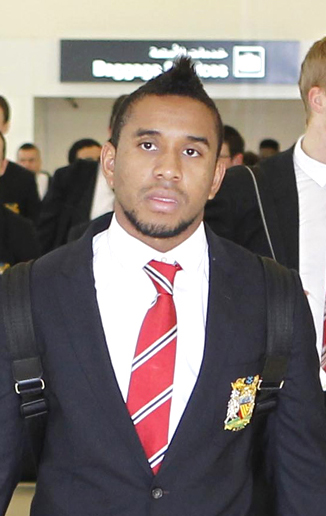
- Anderson in 2013

Personal information
- Full name: Anderson Luís de Abreu Oliveira
- Date of birth: 13 April 1988 (age 38)
- Place of birth: Porto Alegre, Brazil
- Height: 1.76 m (5 ft 9 in)
- Position: Midfielder

Youth career
- 1993–2004: Grêmio

Senior career*
Years	Team	Apps	(Gls)
2004–2006	Grêmio	19	(6)
2006–2007	Porto	18	(2)
2007–2015	Manchester United	105	(6)
2014	→ Fiorentina (loan)	7	(0)
2015–2018	Internacional	50	(1)
2017	→ Coritiba (loan)	12	(0)
2018–2020	Adana Demirspor	12	(0)
Total		223	(15)

International career
2005	Brazil U17 (Note: Only includes 2005 FIFA U-17 World Cup and 2005 South American Under-17 Football Championship)	12	(7)
2008	Brazil U23	5	(1)
2007–2008	Brazil	8	(0)
Medal record
Men's Football
Representing Brazil
Olympic Games
Bronze medal – third place	2008 Beijing	Team
Copa America
Gold medal – first place	2007 Venezuela
- * Club domestic league appearances and goals

Anderson Luís de Abreu Oliveira (born 13 April 1988), commonly known as Anderson, is a Brazilian professional football coach and former player who most recently was assistant manager of Adana Demirspor. He played as a midfielder and is best known for his spell with Manchester United from 2007 to 2015.

Born in Porto Alegre, he began his career with Grêmio, joining the youth team before rising through the ranks. His goal against Náutico during the 2005 play-offs earned Grêmio promotion to the Brazilian Série A. In January 2006, Anderson moved to Porto. There, he won the Primeira Liga twice, along with the Taça de Portugal and Supertaça Cândido de Oliveira during the 2005–06 season. After 18 months in Portugal, he joined English club Manchester United, with whom he won the Premier League title four times, as well as the 2007–08 UEFA Champions League, one League Cup, the FIFA Club World Cup and two FA Community Shields. He fell out of favour at Manchester United following the departure of manager Alex Ferguson in 2013, and spent the second half of the 2013–14 season at Fiorentina before returning to Brazil with Internacional in January 2015. He went on loan to Coritiba in 2017, before returning to Europe in 2018 with Turkish side Adana Demirspor. After a year there, Anderson retired from football in September 2020.

Anderson made his Brazil debut in 2007 during the 2007 Copa América, which they went on to win. He also played for the Brazil Olympic football team during the 2008 Summer Olympics in Beijing, helping them secure the bronze medal.

== Club career ==
=== Grêmio ===
Born in Porto Alegre, Anderson joined Grêmio as a youth player. He made his first appearance for the team on 23 October 2004 in a 3–1 loss to Internacional in the Brazilian Série A, in which he scored a goal from a free-kick. Grêmio, however, were relegated at the season's conclusion and Anderson followed the team to the Brazilian Série B.

It was reported in June 2005 that Portuguese group GestiFute had paid €5 million for 70% of the economic rights to Anderson. On 18 June 2005, Anderson was reported to have signed a pre-contract with Portuguese side Porto.

Anderson earned himself iconic status by scoring the goal that lifted Grêmio back into Série A in a promotion playoff against Náutico in November 2005. This goal was particularly memorable because Grêmio only had seven players on the pitch at the time and had just seen the opposition have a penalty saved. The goal, scored 16 minutes into extra time, gave Grêmio a 1–0 victory in the most unlikely of circumstances.

=== Porto ===
Three months before his 18th birthday, Anderson joined Porto for a €7 million transfer fee in January 2006. As FIFA prohibits the international transfer of any underage players (subject to the exception that the player is moving to other countries to accompany their parents), Anderson's mother, Doralice de Oliveira, relocated to Portugal to facilitate his move abroad. Porto owned 65% of the economic rights, from which Porto would receive 65% of the future transfer fee of the player.

Anderson made his league debut for Porto on 5 March 2006, playing a part in helping the team seal the 2005–06 Primeira Liga title. In the 2006–07 season, he made his UEFA Champions League debut in Porto's first group game against CSKA Moscow. Anderson, however, was forced to miss five months of the season due to a broken leg, as a result of a tackle by Benfica midfielder Kostas Katsouranis. Despite his injury, he managed to appear in 15 games in the 2006–07 season, scoring two goals, and again picking up a league-winners' medal. In total, he made 21 starts for Porto in all competitions.

=== Manchester United ===
==== 2007–08 season ====
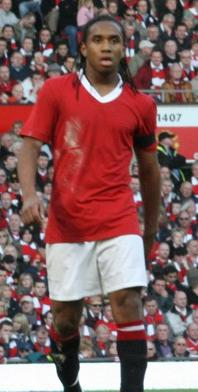
Anderson playing in the Manchester derby on 10 February 2008

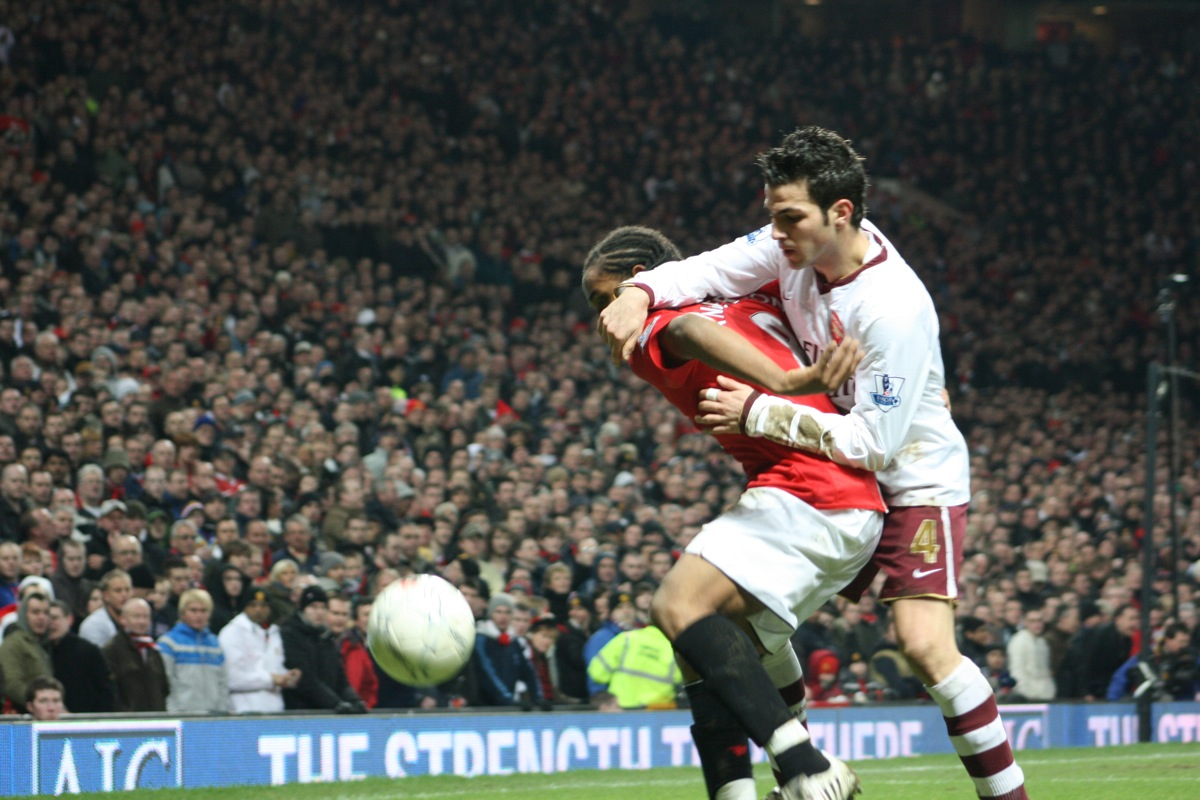
Anderson battling with Cesc Fàbregas for the ball in a home match against Arsenal

On 30 May 2007, the Manchester United website confirmed that the club had agreed in principle to sign Anderson from Porto for an undisclosed fee. The initial application for a work permit for Anderson was rejected on the ground that he did not have enough international caps. Manchester United subsequently argued that only his youth had prevented him from acquiring more caps and that, given his exceptional talent and the size of the transfer fee, clearance was justified. On 29 June 2007, he was granted a work permit to play in the United Kingdom, and the move was completed on 2 July, with Anderson signing a five-year contract to become United's second Brazilian player after Kléberson. The transfer fee Porto announced was €30 million, which was equivalent to around £20 million as of July 2007.

Anderson was friends with Portuguese-speaking new teammates Cristiano Ronaldo and Nani prior to joining the club. He was handed the number 8 shirt, previously worn by Wayne Rooney, who changed to number 10, and made his Manchester United debut on 3 August 2007, playing 45 minutes of a pre-season friendly against Doncaster Rovers, which United won 2–0.

On 1 September 2007, Anderson made his competitive debut for United against Sunderland, before he was substituted at half-time and replaced by striker Louis Saha, who eventually scored the game winner. Anderson made his Champions League debut against Sporting Clube de Portugal in a 0–1 away win on 19 September, coming on as a substitute for Ryan Giggs in the 76th minute. On 26 September, Anderson made his League Cup debut, playing the full 90 minutes in a 2–0 loss to Coventry City, in a team consisting almost entirely of youth and reserve team players.

In the 2008 Champions League final in Moscow, Anderson was brought on as a substitute in the final minute of extra time to replace Wes Brown, and converted United's sixth attempt in the penalty shootout. United won the game 6–5 on penalties to give Anderson the first European honour of his career.

==== 2008–09 season ====
On 6 December 2008, Anderson won the 2008 Golden Boy award. On 21 December 2008, Anderson played 88 minutes of the 2008 FIFA Club World Cup final against LDU Quito, which United won courtesy of a single Wayne Rooney goal to claim the world title. On 1 March 2009, Anderson came on in the 56th minute of the 2009 League Cup final against Tottenham Hotspur, replacing Danny Welbeck. He went on to score the winning penalty in the penalty shootout, winning his first League Cup medal. On 18 May, in the penultimate game of the season against Arsenal, United only needed one point to seal their third successive Premier League title and Anderson's second in two years at the club. Anderson was brought on for Wayne Rooney in the final minute, helping United lift the title at home to their fierce rivals.

==== 2009–10 season ====
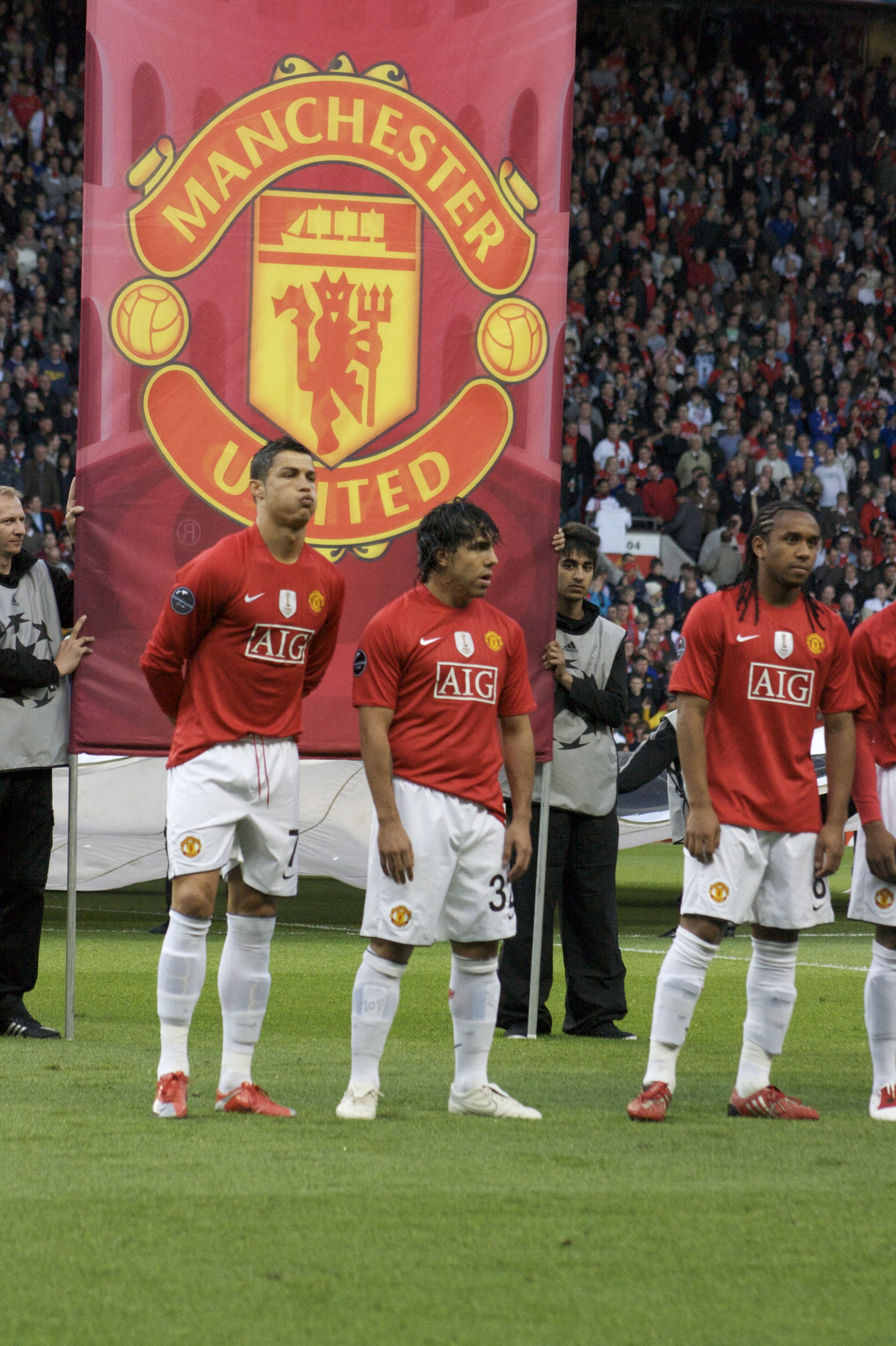
Anderson (right) with Cristiano Ronaldo and Carlos Tevez

Anderson scored his first goal for Manchester United in the Audi Cup friendly tournament against Boca Juniors on 29 July 2009. After United were awarded a free kick on the right side of the penalty area, Anderson stepped up and curled the ball into the far top corner of the goal with his left foot. On 12 September, Anderson went on to score his first competitive goal for Manchester United against Tottenham in his 78th appearance for the club. He latched onto a loose ball at the edge of the area and hammered the ball into the bottom right corner with his left foot, scoring United's second goal of a 1–3 league win at White Hart Lane. In January 2010, Anderson was believed to have returned home to Brazil without manager Sir Alex Ferguson's permission and fined £80,000 by Manchester United.

Anderson returned to the first-team for a match against West Ham United on 23 February, but after just 20 minutes of the match, Anderson ruptured the cruciate ligament in his left knee and had to be substituted by Park Ji-sung. He was later ruled out for the remainder of the season, as well as the 2010 FIFA World Cup, after analysis determined that he would be out for the next six months.

==== 2010–11 season ====
On 20 August 2010, Sir Alex Ferguson confirmed that Anderson had returned to training after the combination of an injury and being involved in a serious car accident. He made his return to action in the 3–2 home victory over Liverpool as an 88th-minute substitute on 19 September. On 7 December, Anderson scored his first goal at Old Trafford and also first European goal for the club in a 1–1 draw with Valencia.

Anderson signed a new 4 1/2-year contract with United on 15 December, keeping him at the club until June 2015. Anderson doubled his United goal tally in one game as he scored twice in a 4–1 second leg semi-final home win over Schalke 04 in the Champions League. The game's aggregate score ended 6–1 to United and therefore reached the final for the third time in four years. In his next game, he scored only his second league goal for United, equalising against Blackpool on 22 May 2011, the final day of the league season, in a match that United went on to win 4–2.

==== 2011–12 season ====
Anderson started the season curtain-raiser, the 2011 FA Community Shield, which resulted in a 3–2 win over Manchester City. He also started the first three games, a 2–1 win against West Bromwich Albion, a 3–0 win against Tottenham Hotspur at home, where he scored his first goal of the season, and the 8–2 win against Arsenal, where he assisted on Danny Welbeck's opening goal.

Anderson scored his second goal of the season in a 2–0 home win against Norwich City in the Premier League. He broke the deadlock on 68 minutes, heading in from six yards after a corner had been knocked back across goal. During a match in the Champions League, Anderson injured his knee, ruling him out until February 2012. Anderson made a surprise return earlier than expected on 31 December 2011, coming on as a second-half substitute in a 3–2 home defeat to Blackburn Rovers. Further injuries led to Anderson, however, being sidelined for the remainder of the season.

==== 2012–13 season ====
Anderson returned in the 2012–13 season, setting an early highlight in the third round League Cup match against Newcastle United on 26 September in 2012, when he scored an excellent opener in a 2–1 victory. He carried his form into the next round of the League Cup on 31 October in a match against Chelsea. He managed to earn three assists in the 80 minutes he played whilst leaving the pitch with United winning 3–2, although they went on to lose 5–4 after extra time. He continued to impress when given the opportunity, and garnered praise for a substitute appearance in the 3–1 win over Queens Park Rangers at Old Trafford. Sir Alex Ferguson stated that "Anderson changed the game".

On 1 December 2012, Anderson scored his first league goal of the season in a 4–3 victory away at Reading. Despite his excellent run of form, Anderson had picked a hamstring injury up in the match and was substituted just before half-time. On 30 January 2013, Anderson played 68 minutes on his return from injury in a 2–1 defeat of Southampton at Old Trafford.

On 19 May 2013, Anderson played the full 90 minutes in Sir Alex Ferguson's final match as Manchester United manager, a 5–5 draw with West Brom at The Hawthorns.

==== 2013–14 season: Loan to Fiorentina ====
After falling out of favour under new Manchester United manager David Moyes, playing just eight games in the first half of the 2013–14 season, Anderson joined Italian club Fiorentina on loan on 18 January 2014 for the remainder of the season. During his five-month loan, Anderson only made seven appearances for Fiorentina, three of which were from the bench. At the end of the season, he returned to Manchester United.

==== 2014–15 season ====
Anderson was not part of the 25-man squad that flew to the US for United's pre-season tour, missing out because of a calf injury he sustained during training. Under new manager Louis van Gaal, Anderson was allocated the number 28 shirt, with Juan Mata having taken the number 8 upon signing in January 2014. His first appearance of the season came in a 4–0 loss at Milton Keynes Dons in the League Cup, where he played the full 90 minutes. After this, Anderson appeared in only one more game for Manchester United, a 0–0 draw with Burnley at Turf Moor. Anderson finally parted with Manchester United by making a switch to Internacional, on a free transfer, during the January transfer window.

=== Internacional ===
On 3 February 2015, Anderson ended his 7 1/2-year association with Manchester United by signing with Brazilian side Internacional on a four-year deal. A statement on Internacional's website read, "Sport Club Internacional concluded on Tuesday the procedures to announce the signing of midfielder Anderson. He signs a four-year contract."

On his debut for Internacional, Anderson missed a penalty kick against Cruzeiro in the Campeonato Gaúcho. In his second match, a 3–1 defeat to The Strongest in the Copa Libertadores on 17 February, Anderson was substituted after 36 minutes and required an oxygen mask due to La Paz's Estadio Hernando Siles being 3.68 km above sea level.

On 1 April, Anderson was sent off in Inter's 1–1 draw with Ypiranga de Erechim.

On 10 May, Anderson made his first Campeonato Brasileiro appearance for Internacional in the team's opening game of the 2015 season; a 3–0 loss at Atlético Paranaense. He received his second red card for the club in a 1–3 home defeat to Atlético Mineiro on 5 July.

On 9 August, Anderson was substituted at half-time in a 5–0 defeat to his former club and Inter's Porto Alegre rivals Grêmio. He then received threats and insults from the club's fans at training on the following Monday and was dropped from Inter's starting line-up for their following ten league fixtures. He returned to the team in a 3–1 loss to Santos on 27 September and remained a regular starter as Inter finished fifth in the league.

=== Adana Demirspor ===
On 30 July 2018, Anderson joined TFF First League side Adana Demirspor. In his first season there, he made just 14 appearances. He started the first match of the 2019–20 season, but was substituted at half-time; he was on the bench for the next game, but then missed the next two entirely. On 20 September, the Adana Demirspor president announced that Anderson had decided to retire from football.

Anderson announced his retirement from football in September 2020.

== International career ==
In April 2005, Anderson played for Brazil in the South American under-17 Championship. The following October, he featured in the 2005 FIFA U-17 World Championship and he won the Golden Ball as Brazil took second place.

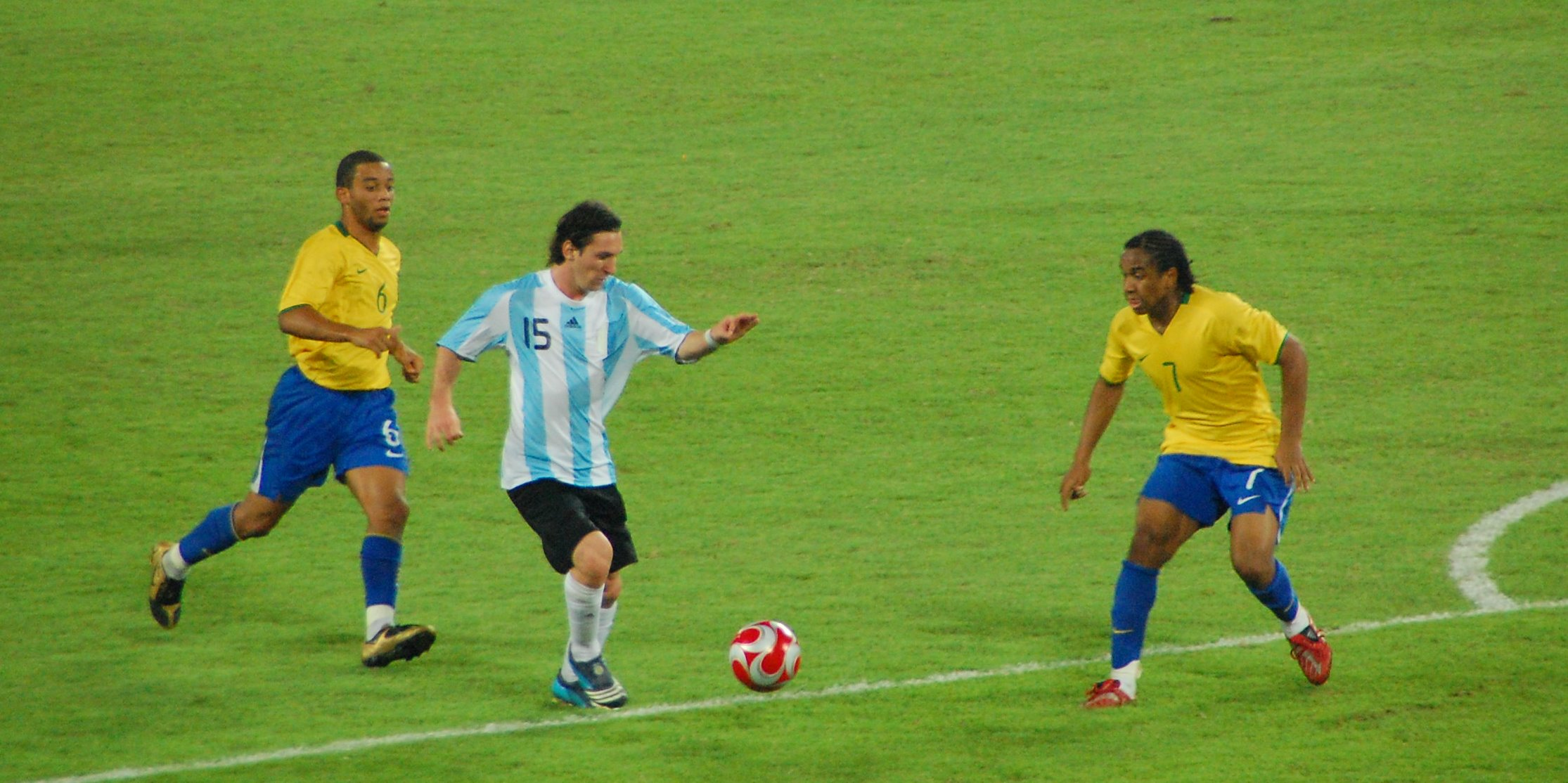
Anderson (right) with Argentina's Lionel Messi and Marcelo (left) at the Olympics.

When Brazil were in danger of going out of the tournament after their opening game defeat against Gambia, Anderson helped to turn their fortunes around in the next match against the Netherlands. Anderson played well against the Dutch, contributing crosses and runs that aided his side. Anderson kept up his level of performance after that, scoring one goal and playing a key role in others, notably setting up Ramon for the first strike against Korea DPR in the quarter-final. After helping to lead Brazil into the final after a 4–3 semi-final victory over Turkey, Anderson lasted only 15 minutes of the final with Mexico before being stretchered off.

Anderson made his international debut for the Brazilian senior team on 27 June 2007 in their 2–0 loss against Mexico in the 2007 Copa América, coming on as a second-half substitute. He made his first start for Brazil on 1 July 2007 against Chile in a 3–0 victory.

In July 2008, Brazil coach Dunga named Anderson in the 18-man squad for the 2008 Summer Olympics. He scored Brazil's first goal in their second group match against New Zealand, a match they went on to win 5–0. On 22 August 2008, Brazil won the bronze medal as they defeated Belgium 3–0.

== Style of play and reception ==
Regarded as a talented and highly promising player in the media in his youth, Anderson later struggled to replicate his precocious performances as his career progressed, and has been accused by some pundits – including Marca's Fran Villalobos and The Guardian's Barney Ronay – of failing to live up to his potential. Keith Griffin of Bleacher Report remarked in 2008 that Anderson was "[o]ne of the most impressive young players to grace the Premier League this season," noting that the midfielder was gifted "with blinding pace, hulkish upper body strength, and vision." Alex Ferguson added that Anderson "can tackle, he's lightning quick, he's brave and he can pass the ball."

In 2009, Will Evans of Bleacher Report described him as a player gifted with pace, physical strength, flair, and technical skills, as well noting his range of passing, crossing ability, defensive skills, and accuracy from penalties as some of his key strengths. He also cited that although Anderson was capable of creating chances for teammates, his biggest weaknesses were his shooting accuracy and lack of goals going forward, something which Ferguson had also previously noted. He felt that Anderson's best positions were either as a central midfielder or as a winger, although Evans's colleague Sam Tighe noted in 2013 that the Brazilian was often deployed as an attacking midfielder in his youth, and was also capable of playing in other positions, and was even used as a deep-lying playmaker on occasion; he labelled him as a dangerous free kick taker with good acceleration and dribbling ability. Regarding Anderson's difficulties in living up to his potential during his time at Manchester United, Chris Atkins of Bleacher Report commented: "Before joining Porto, Anderson was touted as the next Ronaldinho. Having emerged through the Gremio academy system as a tricky attacking midfielder, the comparisons were only natural and, prior to his injury in Portugal, the signs were promising. With excellent acceleration, impressive close control and a powerful shot, he certainly appeared to be an important player for Brazil's future." A left-footed player, his other most noticeable trait was his stamina.

Anderson's former Manchester United teammate Michael Owen described him as "very talented", but suggested that his failure to establish himself at the top level was due to his mentality and poor work-rate, as well as injuries, health issues and his difficulty adapting to different midfield roles. Sam Tighe similarly noted that Anderson struggled when deployed in both holding and box-to-box roles. In 2011, Carlos Alberto Torres argued that Anderson had been used too defensively at Manchester United, and said that he should be given a freer attacking role. Former Brazil midfielder Tostão also criticised Anderson for his static off-the-ball movement when commenting on his performance at the 2005 U17 World Cup, during which he won the Golden Ball after leading Brazil to the final, stating: "He was clearly the best player, but there were times when he just stood around."

Anderson struggled with his diet and weight, and as reported by his Manchester United F.C. teammate Rafael da Silva in his memoir The Sunshine Kids that he had an obsession for McDonald's and would shout "McDonalds!!" whenever they pass one.

== Personal life ==
It was reported that Anderson was hospitalised after a serious car crash in Portugal on 31 July 2010. He had spent the night before at a nightclub before leaving in his Audi R8. The crash occurred at 7 am when the car came off the road and hit a farm wall before entering a field. Anderson was unconscious but was pulled from the car minutes before it exploded. Another man and a woman were also in the car. All three suffered minor injuries and were treated for whiplash, concussion and shock at a hospital. Anderson returned to United to continue his rehabilitation.

Anderson's father died at the age of 41, when Anderson was 14. He has three siblings. Anderson has five children – three daughters and two sons.

In September 2024, a Brazilian court ruled that Anderson would face prison unless he paid outstanding child maintenance of over £45,000.

== Career statistics ==
=== Club ===
Appearances and goals by club, season and competition
Club	Season	League			State League		National cup		League cup		Continental		Other (Note: Includes other competitive competitions, including the Portuguese SuperCup, FA Community Shield, UEFA Super Cup, Intercontinental Cup, FIFA Club World Cup)		Total	
Club	Season	Division	Apps	Goals	Apps	Goals	Apps	Goals	Apps	Goals	Apps	Goals	Apps	Goals	Apps	Goals
Grêmio	2004	Série A	6	1	0	0	0	0	—		—		0	0	6	1
Grêmio	2005	Série B	13	5	8	3	4	0	—		—		0	0	25	8
Grêmio	Total		19	6	8	3	4	0	—		—		0	0	31	9
Porto	2005–06	Primeira Liga	3	0	—		2	0	—		0	0	0	0	5	0
Porto	2006–07	Primeira Liga	15	2	—		0	0	—		4	0	1	1	20	3
Porto	Total		18	2	0	0	2	0	—		4	0	1	1	25	3
Manchester United	2007–08	Premier League	24	0	—		4	0	1	0	9	0	0	0	38	0
Manchester United	2008–09	Premier League	17	0	—		3	0	6	0	9	0	3	0	38	0
Manchester United	2009–10	Premier League	14	1	—		1	0	3	0	5	0	0	0	23	1
Manchester United	2010–11	Premier League	18	1	—		4	0	2	0	6	3	0	0	30	4
Manchester United	2011–12	Premier League	10	2	—		1	0	0	0	4	0	1	0	16	2
Manchester United	2012–13	Premier League	17	1	—		3	0	2	1	4	0	—		26	2
Manchester United	2013–14	Premier League	4	0	—		0	0	2	0	1	0	1	0	8	0
Manchester United	2014–15	Premier League	1	0	—		0	0	1	0	0	0	0	0	2	0
Manchester United	Total		105	5	0	0	16	0	17	1	38	3	5	0	181	9
Fiorentina (loan)	2013–14	Serie A	7	0	—		1	0	—		—		—		8	0
Internacional	2015	Série A	30	0	12	0	1	1	—		2	0	0	0	45	1
Internacional	2016	Série A	20	1	16	3	3	1	—		—		4	0	43	5
Internacional	Total		50	1	28	3	4	2	—		2	0	4	0	88	6
Coritiba (loan)	2017	Série A	12	0	11	3	—		—		—		—		23	3
Adana Demirspor	2018–19	TFF First League	11	0	—		3	0	—		—		—		14	0
Adana Demirspor	2019–20	TFF First League	1	0	—		—		—		—		—		1	0
Adana Demirspor	Total		12	0	—		3	0	—		—		—		15	0
Career total			223	14	47	9	30	2	17	1	44	3	10	1	371	30

=== International ===
Appearances and goals by national team and year
National team	Year	Apps	Goals
Brazil	2007	2	0
Brazil	2008	6	0
Total		8	0

== Honours ==
Grêmio

- Campeonato Brasileiro Série B: 2005

Porto

- Primeira Liga: 2005–06, 2006–07
- Taça de Portugal: 2005–06
- Supertaça Cândido de Oliveira: 2006

Manchester United

- Premier League: 2007–08, 2008–09, 2010–11, 2012–13
- Football League Cup: 2008–09
- FA Community Shield: 2011, 2013
- UEFA Champions League: 2007–08
- FIFA Club World Cup: 2008

Internacional

- Campeonato Gaúcho: 2015

Brazil U17

- South American U-17 Championship: 2005
- FIFA U-17 World Championship runner-up: 2005

Brazil U23

- Olympic Bronze Medal: 2008

Brazil

- Copa América: 2007

Individual

- FIFA U-17 World Championship Golden Ball: 2005
- Golden Boy: 2008
