= Rodrigo Galatto =

Brazilian footballer

Galatto
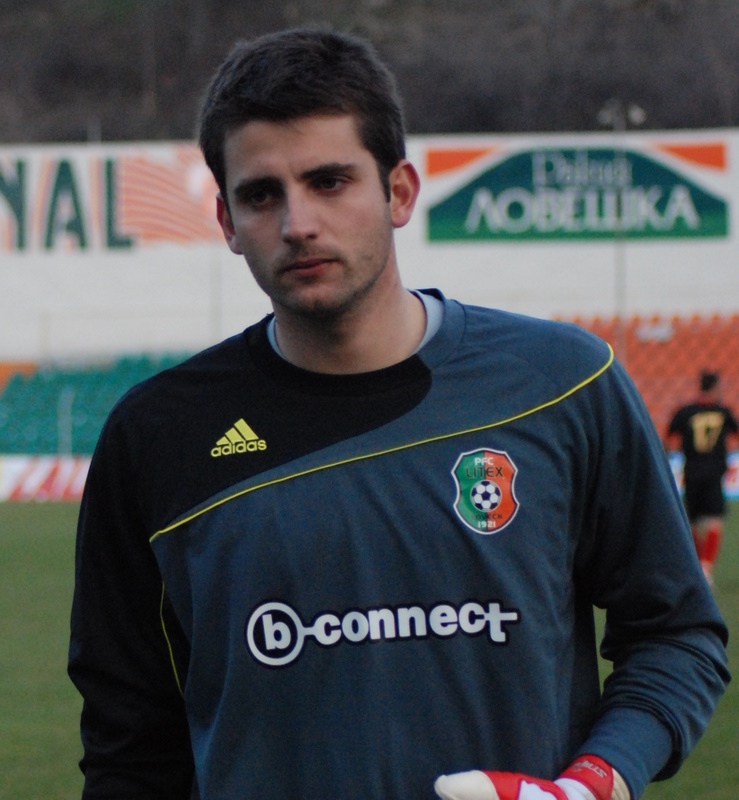
- Galatto with Litex Lovech in 2010

Personal information
- Full name: Rodrigo José Galatto
- Date of birth: 10 April 1983 (age 43)
- Place of birth: Porto Alegre, Brazil
- Height: 1.93 m (6 ft 4 in)
- Position: Goalkeeper

Youth career
- 2002–2003: Grêmio

Senior career*
Years	Team	Apps	(Gls)
2004–2007	Grêmio	21	(0)
2005	→ Brasil Pelotas (loan)	0	(0)
2008–2010	Atlético Paranaense	58	(0)
2010	→ Litex Lovech (loan)	14	(0)
2010–2011	Málaga	4	(0)
2011	Neuchâtel Xamax	1	(0)
2012	Itumbiara	0	(0)
2012	América-RN	1	(0)
2013	CRB	0	(0)
2013–2014	Criciúma	20	(0)
2015	Juventude	0	(0)
Total		119	(0)
- * Club domestic league appearances and goals as of 27 June 2014

Rodrigo José Galatto (born 10 April 1983), or simply Galatto, is a Brazilian former professional footballer who played as a goalkeeper.

== Career ==
=== In Brazil ===
Born in Porto Alegre, Galatto started his youth career with Grêmio. He made his first team debut in a Brazilian Série B in a 2–0 away win against Criciúma EC, on 15 May 2005. Galatto became famous the match known as Batalha dos Aflitos. On 26 November 2005, Nautico and Grêmio was on a match that would guarantee one club in the Brazilian Championship. In stoppage time (90+14), the goalkeeper saved a penalty kick and led his team to the First Division. Even with four players sent off, Grêmio also scored a goal with Anderson (90+16).

In 2008, Galatto transferred to Atlético Paranaense. He quickly became part of the main team and for one-a-half season earned 58 appearances playing in the Campeonato Brasileiro Série A. With the club Galatto became a champion of Campeonato Paranaense in 2009 and played at 2009 Copa Sudamericana.

=== Litex Lovech ===
On 22 January 2010, Galatto was loaned for one year to Bulgarian side Litex Lovech. He made his debut in the A PFG in a match against Lokomotiv Mezdra, on 26 February 2010.

=== Málaga ===
On 6 August 2010, Galatto was snapped by Málaga for a fee of €1.2 million. After passing his medical, he signed a three-year contract with the Andalusians. He made his debut on 12 September 2010 in a match against Zaragoza. However, after the departure of Jesualdo Ferreira in November, Galatto found himself seemed into surplus under the new coach Manuel Pellegrini and after the signing of Sergio Asenjo, the Brazilian had to start looking for a new club. On 15 June 2011, he was released from his contract with Málaga.

== Post-retirement ==
Galatto ran for federal deputy in Brazil's 2018 election, but was not elected.

== Honours ==
Grêmio

- Brazilian Série B: 2005
- Campeonato Gaúcho: 2006, 2007

Atlético Paranaense

- Campeonato Paranaense: 2009

Litex Lovech

- Bulgarian A PFG 2009–2010

CRB

- Campeonato Alagoano: 2013
