= Patrício (footballer) =

Brazilian footballer (born 1974)

Personal information
- Full name: Patrício Antônio Boques
- Date of birth: October 8, 1974 (age 52)
- Place of birth: Aratiba, Brazil
- Height: 1.77 m (5 ft 9 1/2 in)
- Position: Right wing back

Youth career
- 1997–1998: SE Kindermann

Senior career*
Years	Team	Apps	(Gls)
1999	SE Kindermann		
1999	Paraná (Loan)	2	(0)
2000	Caxias (Loan)		
2000	Grêmio (Loan)	23	(1)
2001	Vasco (Loan)	7	(0)
2002	Guarani (Loan)	22	(0)
2003	Guarani (Loan)	6	(0)
2004	SE Kindermann		
2004	15 de Novembro		
2004	Caxias (Loan)		
2005	15 de Novembro	18	(3)
2006	Grêmio (Loan)	31	(2)
2007	Grêmio	50	(4)
2008	Portuguesa	?	(2)
2009	Bahia		
2009–2010	São Caetano	3	(0)
2011	Caxias		
- * Club domestic league appearances and goals

Patrício Antônio Boques or simply Patrício (born October 8, 1974), is a Brazilian right wingback.

== Honours ==
- Brazilian Série B: 2005
- Rio Grande do Sul State Championship: 2006, 2007
