= 2005 Campeonato Brasileiro Série B =

Campeonato Brasileiro Série B
- Season: 2005
- Champions: Grêmio
- Promoted: Grêmio; Santa Cruz
- Relegated: Anapolina; Bahia; Caxias; Criciúma; União Barbarense; Vitória
- Copa Libertadores: Paulista (as Copa do Brasil winners)
- Top goalscorer: Reinaldo (Santa Cruz) - 16

The Campeonato Brasileiro Série B 2005, the second level of the Brazilian National League, was played from April 23 to November 26, 2005. The competition had 22 clubs, of which two were promoted to the Série A and six were relegated to the Série C.

In the first round, every team played against each other, much like what happens in the Série A. Differently from the Série A, each team played against the other only once. Thus, each team played 21 games, 11 home and 10 away (or the opposite), for a total of 231 games. The eight best ranked teams advanced to the second round, where they were divided into two groups of four. Teams in each group played against each other home and away. The two best ranked teams in each group advanced to the final round. Those four teams were put into a single group, and played against each other home and away.

The Grêmio finished with the most points, advancing to the Série A along with Santa Cruz. The six last ranked teams in the first round (Anapolina, Bahia, Caxias, Criciúma, União Barbarense and Vitória) were relegated to play the Série C in 2006.

== Teams ==
- Anapolina (GO)
- Avaí (SC)
- Bahia (BA)
- Caxias (RS)
- Ceará (CE)
- CRB (AL)
- Criciúma (SC)
- Gama (DF)
- Grêmio (RS
- Guarani (SP)
- Ituano (SP)
- Marília (SP)
- Náutico (PE)
- Santa Cruz (PE)
- Paulista (SP)
- Portuguesa (SP)
- Santo André (SP)
- São Raimundo (AM)
- Sport (PE)
- União Barbarense (SP)
- Vila Nova (GO)
- Vitória (BA)

== First stage ==
Pos	Team	Pld	W	D	L	GF	GA	GD	Pts	Qualification or relegation
1	Santa Cruz	21	12	5	4	32	21	+11	41	Qualified to Second Stage
2	Marília	21	11	2	8	38	28	+10	35	Qualified to Second Stage
3	Guarani	21	10	5	6	30	23	+7	35	Qualified to Second Stage
4	Grêmio	21	9	8	4	32	26	+6	35	Qualified to Second Stage
5	Santo André	21	10	4	7	34	25	+9	34	Qualified to Second Stage
6	Portuguesa	21	10	4	7	35	27	+8	34	Qualified to Second Stage
7	Náutico	21	10	3	8	35	34	+1	33	Qualified to Second Stage
8	Avaí	21	10	2	9	34	28	+6	32	Qualified to Second Stage
9	Vila Nova	21	10	2	9	28	29	−1	32	
10	Ituano	21	9	4	8	33	26	+7	31	
11	Ceará	21	8	5	8	27	22	+5	29	
12	CRB	21	8	5	8	28	37	−9	29	
13	Gama	21	8	4	9	28	33	−5	28	
14	São Raimundo	21	8	4	9	22	28	−6	28	
15	Paulista	21	7	7	7	39	35	+4	28	Qualified for the 2006 Copa Libertadores (Note: Paulista qualified as Copa do Brasil winners.)
16	Sport	21	8	3	10	29	32	−3	27	
17	Vitória	21	7	6	8	35	35	0	27	Relegated to Série C 2006
18	Bahia	21	7	4	10	28	33	−5	25	Relegated to Série C 2006
19	Anapolina	21	7	4	10	25	31	−6	25	Relegated to Série C 2006
20	União Barbarense	21	6	6	9	20	24	−4	24	Relegated to Série C 2006
21	Criciúma	21	6	1	14	24	45	−21	19	Relegated to Série C 2006
22	Caxias	21	4	4	13	19	33	−14	16	Relegated to Série C 2006

Source: RSSSFBrasil

== Second stage ==
=== Group A ===
Pos	Team	Pld	W	D	L	GF	GA	GD	Pts	SCZ	GRE	STA	AVA
1	Santa Cruz (Q)	6	4	1	1	13	5	+8	13		1–0	3–0	5–1
2	Grêmio (Q)	6	4	0	2	8	4	+4	12	2–0		0–2	2–0
3	Santo André	6	3	1	2	7	5	+2	10	1–1	0–1		3–0
4	Avaí	6	0	0	6	3	17	−14	0	1–3	1–3	0–1	

Source: RSSSFBrasil
(Q) Qualified to Final Stage

=== Group B ===
Pos	Team	Pld	W	D	L	GF	GA	GD	Pts	NAU	POR	MAR	GUA
1	Náutico (Q)	6	4	0	2	13	7	+6	12		0–1	3–0	1–0
2	Portuguesa (Q)	6	3	1	2	7	6	+1	10	1–2		2–0	1–0
3	Marília	6	3	0	3	10	13	−3	9	4–3	3–1		3–2
4	Guarani	6	1	1	4	6	10	−4	4	1–4	1–1	2–0	

Source: RSSSFBrasil
(Q) Qualified to Final Stage

== Final stage ==
Pos	Team	Pld	W	D	L	GF	GA	GD	Pts	GRE	SCZ	NAU	POR
1	Grêmio (P)	6	3	3	0	8	4	+4	12		2–0	1–0	2–2
2	Santa Cruz (P)	6	3	1	2	7	8	−1	10	1–1		1–0	2–1
3	Náutico	6	2	0	4	6	6	0	6	0–1	0–2		4–1
4	Portuguesa	6	1	2	3	9	12	−3	5	1–1	4–1	0–2	

Source: RSSSFBrasil
(P) Promoted to 2006 Série A

== Trivia ==
- 2005 was a particularly dreadful year for the clubs from the state of Bahia. Both the Vitória (runners-up in 1993) and the Bahia (champions in 1988), accustomed to first-division football, found themselves in the unlikely position of being jointly relegated from the second to the Série C.
- Grêmio may have won the title, but it was not without drama. In the last match against Náutico, the club conceded two penalties. The first, in first half, Náutico's Bruno Carvalho hit the post. The second, in the 80th minute, cost Grêmio three players for arguing with the referee (the Grêmio already had a man down for a second yellow card). The shot was saved by Galatto. Forward Anderson ended up scoring the win. The match was named The "A Batalha dos Aflitos" (The Battle of the Aflitos), referring to the game as a battle in Náutico's stadium, Estádio dos Aflitos.
