= Bruno Carvalho (footballer, born 1974) =

Brazilian footballer

Personal information
- Full name: Bruno Segadas Vianna Carvalho
- Date of birth: 26 March 1974 (age 52)
- Place of birth: Rio de Janeiro, Brazil
- Height: 1.76 m (5 ft 9 in)
- Position: Right back

Senior career*
Years	Team	Apps	(Gls)
1986–1996	Vasco da Gama		
1996–1997	Botafogo		
1997–1998	Bahia		
1998–1999	Fluminense		
1999	Portuguesa		
1999–2003	Flamengo		
2004	Caxias do Sul		
2005	Náutico		
2006	Gama		
2007	Rio Claro		
2007	Santa Cruz		
2007–2008	América (RJ)		

International career
1993	Brazil U-20		
1995	Brazil	4	(0)
- * Club domestic league appearances and goals

Bruno Segadas Vianna Carvalho (born 26 March 1974 in Rio de Janeiro) is a former Brazilian football player. He made four appearances for the Brazil national team in 1995.

He was on trial at Livingston in summer 2003, but he failed to obtain a work permit. He moved to Sweden to play on trial for Djurgårdens IF but did not get a contract with the club.

In June 2007, he signed a one-year contract with América (RJ).

He is a U-20 international and played in the 1993 FIFA World Youth Championship.
