= 2013 Sport Club Corinthians Paulista season =

Corinthians
2013 season
- President: Mário Gobbi
- Coach: Tite
- Brasileirão: 10th
- Paulistão: Champion
- Libertadores: Round of 16
- Recopa Sudamericana: Champion
- Copa do Brasil: Quarter-final
- Highest home attendance: 39,361 vs Flamengo (1 September 2013)
Home colors	Away colors	Third colors

The 2013 season is the 102nd season in the history of Sport Club Corinthians Paulista.

In this season, they have competed on the Campeonato Paulista, winning it for a 27th time, and in the Copa Libertadores, being eliminated at the round of 16. Won the Recopa Sudamericana after defeating São Paulo. Was eliminated in the quarter-finals of the Copa do Brasil. Finished 10th in the Campeonato Brasileiro Série A.

In November, Corinthians has announced it would not renew with Tite.

== Players ==
=== First team squad ===
As of 20 October 2013

Note: Flags indicate national team as defined under FIFA eligibility rules; some limited exceptions apply. Players may hold more than one non-FIFA nationality.

No.	Pos.	Nation	Player
1	GK	BRA	Júlio César
2	DF	BRA	Alessandro (captain)
3	DF	BRA	Cleber
4	DF	BRA	Gil
5	MF	BRA	Ralf
6	DF	BRA	Fábio Santos
7	FW	BRA	Alexandre Pato
8	MF	BRA	Renato Augusto
9	FW	PER	Paolo Guerrero
10	MF	BRA	Douglas
11	FW	QAT	Emerson
12	GK	BRA	Cássio
13	DF	BRA	Paulo André
14	MF	CHI	Claudio Maldonado
15	DF	BRA	Guilherme Andrade
16	DF	BRA	Igor

No.	Pos.	Nation	Player
17	MF	BRA	Rodriguinho
18	MF	BRA	Ibson
19	MF	BRA	Guilherme
20	MF	BRA	Danilo (vice-captain)
21	MF	BRA	Edenilson
22	GK	BRA	Danilo Fernandes
23	DF	BRA	Diego Macedo (on loan from Bragantino)
25	FW	BRA	Léo
26	DF	BRA	Antonio Carlos
27	GK	BRA	Walter
28	DF	BRA	Felipe
29	FW	BRA	Douglas Willian
30	FW	BRA	Paulo Victor
31	FW	BRA	Romarinho
32	MF	BRA	Jocinei
35	FW	CHN	Chen Zhizhao (on loan from Shanghai Shenxin)

=== Out on Loan ===
Note: Flags indicate national team as defined under FIFA eligibility rules; some limited exceptions apply. Players may hold more than one non-FIFA nationality.

No.	Pos.	Nation	Player
—	GK	BRA	Renan (on loan to Guarani)
—	DF	BRA	Wellington Saci (on loan to Figueirense)
—	MF	BRA	Boquita (on loan to Portuguesa)
—	MF	BRA	Nenê Bonilha (on loan to Audax São Paulo)
—	MF	PER	Luis Ramirez (on loan to Ponte Preta)

No.	Pos.	Nation	Player
—	MF	ARG	Matías Defederico (on loan to Huracán)
—	MF	BRA	Eduardo Ramos (on loan to Paysandu)
—	MF	BRA	Vitor Júnior (on loan to Coritiba)
—	MF	BRA	Anderson (on loan to Avaí)
—	FW	BRA	Taubaté (on loan to Comercial-SP)

== Competitions ==
=== Overview ===
Competition	First match	Last match	Starting round	Final position	Record							
Competition	First match	Last match	Starting round	Final position	Pld	W	D	L	GF	GA	GD	Win %
Série A	25 May 2013	7 December 2013	Matchday 1	10th	38	11	17	10	27	22	+5	28.95
Campeonato Paulista	20 January 2013	19 May 2013	Matchday 1	Winners	23	11	10	2	38	18	+20	47.83
Copa Libertadores	20 February 2013	15 May 2013	Group stage	Round of 16	8	4	2	2	11	4	+7	50.00
Recopa Sudamericana	3 July 2013	17 July 2013	Final	Winners	2	2	0	0	4	1	+3	100.00
Copa do Brasil	21 August 2013	23 October 2013	Round of 16	Quarter-finals	4	1	2	1	2	1	+1	25.00
Total					75	29	31	15	82	46	+36	38.67

Source: Competitions

== Campeonato Paulista ==
Pos	Team	Pld	W	D	L	GF	GA	GD	Pts	Qualification or relegation
3	Santos	19	11	6	2	35	21	+14	39	Advanced to the Quarter-finals
4	Ponte Preta	19	10	8	1	27	13	+14	38	Advanced to the Quarter-finals
5	Corinthians	19	9	8	2	31	16	+15	35	Advanced to the Quarter-finals
6	Palmeiras	19	9	7	3	34	24	+10	34	Advanced to the Quarter-finals
7	Botafogo-SP	19	9	4	6	26	23	+3	31	Advanced to the Quarter-finals

Updated to match(es) played on unknown. Source:
Rules for classification: 1st points; 2nd games won; 3rd number of goals scored; 4th results between the teams; 5th less red cards; 6th less yellow cards; 7th raffle.

=== First stage ===
20 January 2013 1	Paulista	1–1	Corinthians	Jundiai
17:00 UTC−3	João Henrique 80'	Report	Giovanni 58'	Stadium: Jayme Cintra; Attendance: 8,301; Referee: Marcelo Aparecido de Souza

23 January 2013 2	Corinthians	0–1	Ponte Preta	São Paulo
17:00 UTC−3		Report	William 88' (pen.)	Stadium: Pacaembu; Attendance: 19,147; Referee: Luiz Vanderlei Martinucho

27 January 2013 3	Mirassol	0–1	Corinthians	Mirassol
17:00 UTC−3		Report	Romarinho 7' (pen.)	Stadium: Estádio José Maria de Campos Maia; Attendance: 8,607; Referee: Welton Orlando Wohnrat

30 January 2013 4	Corinthians	2–1	Mogi Mirim	São Paulo
22:00 UTC−3	Jorge Henrique 43'; Fábio Santos 51' (pen.)	Report	Henrique 9'	Stadium: Pacaembu; Attendance: 21,241; Referee: José Cláudio Rocha Filho

3 February 2013 5	Corinthians	5–0	Oeste	São Paulo
17:00 UTC−3	Guerrero 9' 12'; Paulinho 41'; Danilo 69'; Alexandre Pato 74'	Report		Stadium: Pacaembu; Attendance: 36.480; Referee: Leandro Bizzio Marinho

6 February 2013 6	Botafogo -SP	0–0	Corinthians	Ribeirão Preto
22:00 UTC−3		Report		Stadium: Santa Cruz; Attendance: 26,507; Referee: Vinicius Furlan

9 February 2013 7	Corinthians	2–2	São Caetano	São Paulo
16:20 UTC−3	Guerrero 37'; Paulinho 87'	Report	Rivaldo 48'; Danielzinho 64'	Stadium: Pacaembu; Attendance: 27,774; Referee: Marcelo Aparecido de Souza

17 February 2013 8	Corinthians	2–2	Palmeiras	São Paulo
16:00 UTC−3	Emerson 18'; Romarinho 71'	Report	Vilson 30'; Vinícius 53'	Stadium: Pacaembu; Attendance: 36,072; Referee: Antonio Rogério do Prado

24 February 2013 9	Bragantino	2–2	Corinthians	Bragança Paulista
16:00 UTC−3	Léo Jaime 46'; Lincolm 54'	Report	Alexandre Pato 48'; Guerrero 94'	Stadium: Nabi Abi Chedid; Attendance: 8,822; Referee: Leandro Bizzio Marinho

3 March 2013 10	Santos	0–0	Corinthians	São Paulo
16:00 UTC−3		Report		Stadium: Morumbi; Attendance: 17,155; Referee: Guilherme Ceretta de Lima

9 March 2013 11	Corinthians	3–2	Ituano	São Paulo
16:20 UTC−3	Edenílson 16'; Guilherme 33'; Felipe 85'	Report	Cleber 23'; Luciano 36'	Stadium: Pacaembu; Attendance: 21,491; Referee: Aurélio Santanna Martins

16 March 2013 12	Corinthians	3–0	União Barbarense	São Paulo
16:20 UTC−3	Douglas 52'; Jorge Henrique 87'; Renato Augusto 90'	Report		Stadium: Pacaembu; Attendance: 20,906; Referee: Marcelo Aparecido de Souza

20 March 2013 13	XV de Piracicaba	1–1	Corinthians	Piracicaba
22:00 UTC−3	Emerson 75'	Report	Diguinho 87'	Stadium: Barão da Serra Negra; Attendance: 10,715; Referee: Leonardo Ferreira Lima

24 March 2013 14	Guarani	0–1	Corinthians	Campinas
16:00 UTC−3		Report	Guerrero 6'	Stadium: Brinco de Ouro; Attendance: 6,379; Referee: Welton Orlando Wohnrat

27 March 2013 15	Corinthians	1–1	Penapolense	São Paulo
22:00 UTC−3	Heleno 4' (o.w.)	Report	Silvinho 74'	Stadium: Pacaembu; Attendance: 13,834; Referee: Adriano de Assis Miranda

31 March 2013 16	São Paulo	1–2	Corinthians	São Paulo
16:00 UTC−3	Jádson 4'	Report	Danilo 41'; Alexandre Pato 82' (pen.)	Stadium: Morumbi; Attendance: 20,930; Referee: Leandro Bizzio Marinho

7 April 2013 17	Corinthians	2–0	São Bernardo	São Paulo
16:00 UTC−3	Jorge Henrique 37'; Guerrero 87'	Report		Stadium: Pacaembu; Attendance: 21,302; Referee: Marcelo Prieto Alfieri

14 April 2013 18	Linense	2–1	Corinthians	Lins
16:00 UTC−3	João Sales 55'; Leandro Brasília 64'	Report	Guerrero 4'	Stadium: Gilberto Siqueira Lopes; Attendance: 11,064; Referee: Leonardo Ferreira Lima

21 April 2013 19	Corinthians	2–0	Atlético Sorocaba	São Paulo
16:00 UTC−3	Danilo 34'; Alexandre Pato 45'	Report		Stadium: Pacaembu; Attendance: 26,138; Referee: Luiz Vanderlei Martinucho

=== Quarter-finals ===
28 April 2013	Ponte Preta	0–4	Corinthians	Campinas
16:00 UTC−3		Report	Romarinho 32'; Emerson 38'; Guerrero 56' (pen.); Alexandre Pato 89'	Stadium: Moisés Lucarelli; Attendance: 12,460; Referee: Raphael Claus

=== Semi-finals ===
5 May 2013	São Paulo	0–0 (3–4 p)	Corinthians	São Paulo
16:00 UTC−3		Report		Stadium: Morumbi; Attendance: 29,475; Referee: Antonio Rogério do Prado
	Penalties
	Rogério Ceni (penalty scored); Toloi (penalty scored); Ganso (penalty missed); Jádson (penalty scored); Luís Fabiano (penalty missed)		(penalty scored) Douglas; (penalty scored) Romarinho; (penalty scored) Fábio Santos; (penalty missed) Alessandro; (penalty scored) Pato

=== Final ===
12 May 2013 First Leg	Corinthians	2–1	Santos	São Paulo
16:00 UTC−3	Paulinho 41'; Paulo André 74'	Report	Durval 81'	Stadium: Pacaembu; Attendance: 38,505; Referee: Wilson Luiz Seneme

19 May 2013 Second Leg	Santos	1–1 (2–3 agg.)	Corinthians	Santos
16:00 UTC−3	Danilo 28'	Report	Cícero 26'	Stadium: Vila Belmiro; Attendance: 14,740; Referee: Guilherme Ceretta de Lima

== Copa Libertadores ==
=== Group 5 ===
Pos	Team	Pld	W	D	L	GF	GA	GD	Pts	COR	TIJ	SJO	MIL
1	(Brazil) Corinthians (A)	6	4	1	1	10	2	+8	13		3–0	3–0	2–0
2	(Mexico) Tijuana (A)	6	4	1	1	8	4	+4	13	1–0		4–0	1–0
3	(Bolivia) San José	6	1	2	3	5	11	−6	5	1–1	1–1		2–0
4	(Colombia) Millonarios	6	1	0	5	2	8	−6	3	0–1	0–1	2–1	

Source: RSSSF
Legend: Blue = home team win; Yellow = draw; Red = away team win.
(A) Advanced to the round of 16

20 February 2013 1	San José	1–1	Corinthians	Oruro
21:00 UTC−4	saucedo 61'		Guerrero 6'	Stadium: Estadio Jesús Bermúdez; Referee: Carlos Vera (Ecuador)

27 February 2013 2	Corinthians	2–0	Millonarios	São Paulo
22:00 UTC−3	Guerrero 10'; Pato 48'			Stadium: Estadio do Pacaembu; Referee: Néstor Pitana (Argentina)

6 March 2013 3	Tijuana	1–0	Corinthians	Tijuana
17:00 UTC−8	Gandolfi 67'			Stadium: Estadio Caliente; Referee: Víctor Carrillo (Peru)

13 March 2013 4	Corinthians	2–0	Tijuana	São Paulo
22:00 UTC−3	Pato 28'; Guerrero 37'; Paulinho 83'			Stadium: Estádio do Pacaembu; Attendance: 33,120; Referee: Víctor Carrillo (Peru)

3 April 2013 5	Millonarios	0–1	Corinthians	Bogotá
20:00 UTC−5			Danilo 57'	Stadium: Estadio El Campín; Referee: Saúl Laverni (Argentina)

10 April 2013 6	Corinthians	3–0	San José	São Paulo
22:00 UTC−3	Romarinho 26'; Guerrero 60'; Edenílson 90+3'			Stadium: Estádio do Pacaembu; Attendance: 33,846; Referee: Mauro Vigliano(Argentina)

=== Round of 16 ===
1 May 2013 First leg	Boca Juniors	1–0	Corinthians	Buenos Aires
22:00 UTC−3	Nicolás Blandi 26'			Stadium: Estadio Alberto J. Armando (La Bombonera); Attendance: 40,518; Referee: Enrique Osses (Chile)

15 May 2013 Second leg	Corinthians	1–1 (1–2 agg.)	Boca Juniors	São Paulo
22:00 UTC−3	Paulinho 51'		Riquelme 26'	Stadium: Estádio do Pacaembu; Attendance: 38,435; Referee: Carlos Amarilla (Paraguay)

== Recopa Sudamericana ==
=== Results ===
3 July 2013 First Leg	São Paulo	1–2	Corinthians	São Paulo, SP
21:50 UTC−3	Aloísio 47'	Report	Guerrero 29'; Renato Augusto 76'	Stadium: Estádio do Morumbi; Attendance: 31,691; Referee: Ricardo Marques (Brazil)

17 July 2013 Second Leg	Corinthians	2–0 (4–1 agg.)	São Paulo	São Paulo, SP
21:50 UTC−3	Romarinho 36'; Danilo 69'	Report		Stadium: Estádio do Pacaembu; Attendance: 38,050; Referee: Paulo Oliveira (Brazil)

== Copa do Brasil ==
=== Round of 16 ===
21 August 2013 First Leg	Luverdense	1–0	Corinthians	Lucas do Rio Verde, MT
21:50 UTC−3	Misael 90'			Stadium: Passo das Emas Stadium; Attendance: 9,102; Referee: Pablo dos Santos Alves

28 August 2013 Second Leg	Corinthians	2–0 (2–1 agg.)	Luverdense	São Paulo, SP
21:50 UTC−3	Alexandre Pato 30'; Fábio Santos 45'			Stadium: Estádio do Pacaembu; Attendance: 28,576; Referee: Wagner do Nascimento Magalhães

=== Quarter-finals ===
25 September 2013 First Leg	Corinthians	0–0	Grêmio	São Paulo, SP
21:50 UTC−3				Stadium: Estádio do Pacaembu; Attendance: 28,351; Referee: Ricardo Marques Ribeiro

23 October 2013 Second Leg	Grêmio	0–0 (0–0 agg.) (3–2 p)	Corinthians	Porto Alegre, RS
21:50 UTC−3				Stadium: Arena do Grêmio; Attendance: 33,503; Referee: Paulo Godoy Bezerra
	Penalties
	Barcos (penalty missed); Alex Telles (penalty missed); Pará (penalty scored); Elano (penalty scored); Kléber (penalty scored)		(penalty missed) Danilo; (penalty scored) Romarinho; (penalty missed) Edenílson; (penalty scored) Alessandro; (penalty missed) Pato
