= 2012 Sport Club Corinthians Paulista season =

Corinthians
2012 season
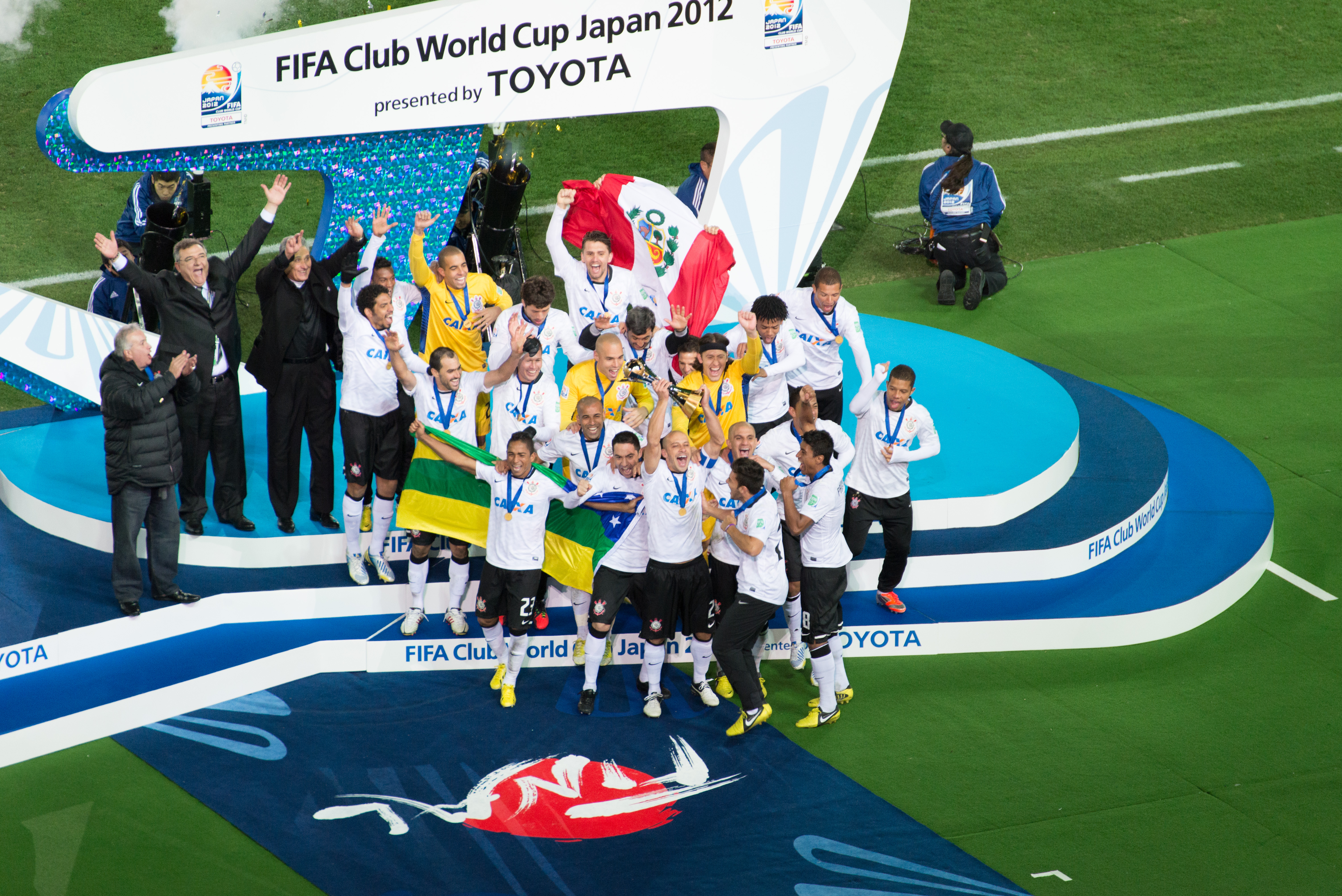
- Corinthians as 2012 World Champions
- Manager: Tite
- Série A: 6th
- Campeonato Paulista: Quarter-finals
- Copa Libertadores: Winners
- FIFA Club World Cup: Winners
- Top goalscorer: League: All: Paulinho (26 goals)
- Highest home attendance: 40,186 (vs Boca Juniors, 4 July 2012)
- Lowest home attendance: 6,960 (vs XV de Piracicaba, 28 March 2012)
Home colors	Away colors

The 2012 season is the 102nd season in the history of Sport Club Corinthians Paulista. In 2012, Corinthians won their first Copa Libertadores title and also won the FIFA Club World Cup after defeating Chelsea 1–0 in the final.

== Background ==
=== Kit ===
- Home (2012): White shirt, black shorts and white socks;
- Away (2012): Black shirt, white shorts and black socks.

- Keeper Kits:
- Shirt yellow, shorts and yellow socks.
- Shirt gray, gray shorts and socks.
- Shirt blue, blue shorts and socks.
- Shirt black, black shorts and socks.

== Competitions ==
=== Overview ===
Competition	First match	Last match	Starting round	Final position	Record							
Competition	First match	Last match	Starting round	Final position	Pld	W	D	L	GF	GA	GD	Win %
Série A	20 May 2012	2 December 2012	Matchday 1	6th	38	15	12	11	51	39	+12	39.47
Campeonato Paulista	21 January 2012	22 April 2012	Matchday 1	Quarter-finals	20	14	4	2	30	14	+16	70.00
Copa Libertadores	15 February 2012	4 July 2012	Group stage	Winners	14	8	6	0	22	4	+18	57.14
FIFA Club World Cup	12 December 2012	16 December 2012	Semi-final	Winners	2	2	0	0	2	0	+2	100.00
Total					74	39	22	13	105	57	+48	52.70

Source: Competitions

== Campeonato Paulista ==
=== Results ===
21 January 2012 1	Corinthians	2–1	Mirassol	Pacaembu, São Paulo
17:00 BRT	Élton 75'		Xuxa 29'; Dezinho 88' (o.g.)	Attendance: 16,117; Referee: Marcio Henrique de Gois

25 January 2012 2	Guaratinguetá	0–2	Corinthians	Dario Rodrigues Leite, Guaratinguetá
22:00 BRT			Chicão 27'; Alessandro 42'	Attendance: 11,003; Referee: Rodrigo Guarizo Ferreira do Amaral

29 January 2012 3	Corinthians	1–0	Linense	Pacaembu, São Paulo
17:00 BRT	Emerson 79'			Attendance: 15,105; Referee: Marcelo Rogério

1 February 2012 4	Ituano	0–1	Corinthians	Estádio Novelli Júnior, Itu
22:00 BRT			Paulinho 32'	Attendance: 11,269; Referee: Flávio Rodrigues Guerra

5 February 2012 5	Corinthians	1–1	Bragantino	Pacaembu, São Paulo
17:00 BRT	Ramírez 51'		Serginho 3'	Attendance: 16,282; Referee: Leonardo Ferreira Lima

8 February 2012 6	Mogi Mirim	1–1	Corinthians	Romildão, Moji-Mirim
22:00 BRT	Hernane 86'		Emerson 13'	Attendance: 7,331; Referee: Marcio Henrique de Gois

12 February 2012 7	Corinthians	1–0	São Paulo	Pacaembu, São Paulo
17:00 BRT	Danilo 21'			Attendance: 26,166; Referee: Raphael Claus

18 February 2012 8	São Caetano	0–1	Corinthians	Luisão, São Carlos
16:20 BRT			Willian 63'	Attendance: 5,609; Referee: Aurélio Santanna Martins

22 February 2012 9	Portuguesa	0–2	Corinthians	Estádio do Canindé, São Paulo
22:00 BRT			Willian 29'; Ramírez 79'	Attendance: 14,792; Referee: Leonardo Ferreira Lima

25 February 2012 10	Corinthians	1–0	Botafogo (SP)	Pacaembu, São Paulo
18:30 BRT	Adriano 3'			Attendance: 17,162; Referee: Robério Pereira Pires

29 February 2012 11	Corinthians	2–1	Catanduvense	Pacaembu, São Paulo
22:00 BRT	Paulinho 80'; Danilo 90+1'		Alessandro 53' (o.g.)	Attendance: 9,946; Referee: Rodrigo Braghetto

4 March 2012 12	Santos	1–0	Corinthians	Vila Belmiro, Santos
16:00 BRT	Ibson 58'			Attendance: 12,808; Referee: Wilson Luiz Seneme

10 March 2012 13	Corinthians	1–1	Guarani	Pacaembu, São Paulo
18:30 BRT	Elton 25'		Fumagalli 88'	Attendance: 15,421; Referee: José Claudio Rocha Filho

18 March 2012 14	Comercial	3–3	Corinthians	Estádio Palma Travassos, Ribeirão Preto
16:00 BRT	Elton 29'; Fabão 51'; Ferreira 78'		Emerson 35' (pen.); Gilsinho 90+1'; Ramon 90+3'	Attendance: 12,870; Referee: Alessandro Darcie

25 March 2012 15	Corinthians	2–1	Palmeiras	Pacaembu, São Paulo
16:00 BRT	Paulinho 49'; Araújo 51'		Assunção 17'	Attendance: 29,284; Referee: Marcelo Rogério

28 March 2012 16	Corinthians	1–0	XV de Piracicaba	Pacaembu, São Paulo
22:00 BRT	Ramon 26'			Attendance: 6,960; Referee: Welton Orlando Wohnrath

1 April 2012 17	Oeste	0–3	Corinthians	Presidente Prudente
16:00 BRT			Liédson 54', 89'; Willian 63'	Attendance: 8,843; Referee: Aurélio Santanna Martins

8 April 2012 18	Corinthians	1–0	Paulista	Pacaembu, São Paulo
16:00 BRT	Willian 79'			Attendance: 13,006; Referee: José Claudio Rocha Filho

15 April 2012 19	Ponte Preta	1–2	Corinthians	Majestoso, Campinas
16:00 BRT	Renato Cajá 90' (pen.)		Chicão 46' (pen.); Weldinho 51'	Attendance: 7,418; Referee: Demetrius Pinto Candançan

Colours: Green = Corinthians win; Yellow = draw; Red = opponents win.

==== Quarterfinals ====
22 April	Corinthians	2–3	Ponte Preta	Pacaembu, São Paulo
18:00 BRT	Ralf (yellow card) 53'; Liédson (yellow card) 61'; Willian 74'; Alex 90'	Report	Willian Magrão 12', (yellow card) 37'; Roger (yellow card) 22', (goal) 34'; Renato Cajá (yellow card) 29'; Guilherme (yellow card) 29'; Bruno (yellow card) 22'; Cicinho (yellow card) 36'; Fuso (yellow card) 70'; Rodrigo Pimpão 89'	Attendance: 24,254; Referee: Rodrigo Braghetto

Source: (Portuguese)

=== Statistics ===
First stage
Pos	Team	Pld	W	D	L	GF	GA	GD	Pts	Qualification or relegation
1	Corinthians	19	14	4	1	28	11	+17	46	Advanced to the Knockout stage
2	São Paulo	19	13	4	2	42	21	+21	43	Advanced to the Knockout stage
3	Santos	19	12	3	4	46	18	+28	39	Advanced to the Knockout stage
4	Guarani	19	11	3	5	26	18	+8	36	Advanced to the Knockout stage
5	Palmeiras	19	10	6	3	37	24	+13	36	Advanced to the Knockout stage

Updated to match(es) played on 15 April 2012. Source: Futpédia and UOL Esporte
Rules for classification: 1st points; 2nd goal difference; 3rd number of goals scored; 4th less red cards; 5th less yellow cards; 6th raffle;

==== Results summary ====
Overall								Home						Away					
Pld	W	D	L	GF	GA	GD	Pts	W	D	L	GF	GA	GD	W	D	L	GF	GA	GD
19	14	4	1	28	11	+17	46	8	2	0	13	5	+8	6	2	1	15	6	+9

Pld = Matches played; W = Matches won; D = Matches drawn; L = Matches lost; GF = Goals for; GA = Goals against; GD = Goal difference

==== Results by round ====
Round	1	2	3	4	5	6	7	8	9	10	11	12	13	14	15	16	17	18	19
Ground	H	A	H	A	H	A	H	A	A	H	H	A	H	A	H	H	A	H	A
Result	W	W	W	W	D	D	W	W	W	W	W	L	D	D	W	W	W	W	W
Position	6	4	2	1	3	3	2	1	1	1	1	1	1	3	2	2	2	2	1

Updated to match(es) played on 26 June 2012. Source:
A = Away; H = Home; W = Win; D = Draw; L = Loss

== Copa Libertadores ==
=== Results ===
Pos	Team	Pld	W	D	L	GF	GA	GD	Pts	COR	CAZ	NAC	TAC
1	(Brazil) Corinthians	6	4	2	0	13	2	+11	14		1–0	2–0	6–0
2	(Mexico) Cruz Azul	6	3	2	1	11	4	+7	11	0–0		4–1	4–0
3	(Paraguay) Nacional	6	1	1	4	6	13	−7	4	1–3	1–2		3–2
4	(Venezuela) Deportivo Táchira	6	0	3	3	4	15	−11	3	1–1	1–1	0–0	

Legend: Blue = home team win; Yellow = draw; Red = away team win.

15 February 2012 1	Deportivo Táchira (Venezuela)	1–1	(Brazil) Corinthians	San Cristóbal, Colombia
19:00 UTC−2	Clavijo (yellow card) 11'; Herrera 22'; Villafráz (yellow card) 51'; Casanova (yellow card) 60'; Rivas (yellow card) 80'; Chacón (yellow card) 90+2'	Report	(yellow card) 58' Alessandro; 90+4' Ralf	Stadium: Polideportivo Pueblo Nuevo; Referee: C. Vera

7 March 2012 2	Corinthians (Brazil)	2–0	(Paraguay) Nacional	São Paulo, SP
20:00 UTC−3	Castán (yellow card) 35'; Danilo 39'; Santos (yellow card) 63'; Jorge Henrique 67'	Report	(yellow card) 40' González	Stadium: Pacaembu; Attendance: 30,983; Referee: H. Baldassi

14 March 2011 3	Cruz Azul (Mexico)	0–0	(Brazil) Corinthians	Mexico City, Mexico
21:00 UTC−3		Report	(yellow card) 54' Paulinho	Stadium: Estadio Azul; Referee: S. Pezzotta

21 March 2011 4	Corinthians (Brazil)	1–0	(Mexico) Cruz Azul	São Paulo, SP
21:50 UTC−3	Danilo 36'; Ralf (yellow card) 42'; Danilo (yellow card) 70'; Emerson (yellow card) 87'	Report	(yellow card) 35' Pinto; (yellow card) 45' Mariaca; (yellow card) 35' (yellow-red card) 71' Pinto; (yellow card) 90+1' Perea	Stadium: Pacaembu; Attendance: 31,977; Referee: R. Silvera

11 April 2011 5	Nacional (Paraguay)	1–3	(Brazil) Corinthians	Ciudad del Este, Paraguay
21:00 UTC−3	Riveros (yellow card) 28'; Orué (yellow card) 40'; Miers (yellow card) 44'; Ruiz 69'; Mazacotte (yellow card) 85'	Report	29' Jorge Henrique; 52' Emerson; 71' Élton	Stadium: Oddone Sarubbi; Referee: M. Vázquez

18 April 2011 6	Corinthians (Brazil)	6–0	(Venezuela) Deportivo Táchira	São Paulo, SP
20:50 UTC−3	Danilo 18'; Paulinho 27'; Jorge Henrique 63'; Emerson 70'; Liédson 72'; Douglas 84' (pen.)	Report	(yellow card) 13' Parra; (red card) 36' Rouga; (yellow card) 42' Díaz; (yellow card) 71' Chacón	Stadium: Pacaembu; Attendance: 28,740; Referee: N. Pittana

==== Knockout stage ====
===== Round of 16 =====
27 April 2011 First leg	Emelec (Ecuador)	0–0	(Brazil) Corinthians	Guayaquil, Ecuador
21:50 UTC−3	Danilo (yellow card) 17'; Ganso 38'; Adriano (yellow card) 90+1'	Report	Rojas (yellow card) 14'; Mosquera (yellow card) 50'; Layún (yellow card) 69' (yellow-red card) 90+2'	Stadium: George Capwell; Referee: J. Larrionda

9 May 2011 Second leg	Corinthians (Brazil)	3–0 (3–0 agg.)	(Ecuador) Emelec	São Paulo, SP
22:00 UTC−3	Santos 7'; Paulinho 64'; Alex 85'	Report		Stadium: Pacaembu; Attendance: 34,329; Referee: C. Vera

===== Quarter-finals =====
16 May 2011 First leg	Vasco da Gama (Brazil)	0–0	(Brazil) Corinthians	Rio de Janeiro, RJ
21:50 UTC−2		Report		Stadium: São Januário; Attendance: 20,510; Referee: Sandro Ricci (Brazil)

23 May 2011 Second leg	Corinthians (Brazil)	1–0 (1–0 agg.)	(Brazil) Vasco da Gama	São Paulo, SP
22:00 UTC−3	Paulinho 87'	Report		Stadium: Pacaembu; Attendance: 37,936; Referee: Leandro Vuaden (Brazil)

===== Semi-finals =====
13 June 2011 First leg	Santos (Brazil)	0–1	(Brazil) Corinthians	Santos, SP
21:50 UTC−3		Report	Emerson 28'	Stadium: Vila Belmiro; Attendance: 14,788; Referee: Leandro Vuaden (Brazil)

20 June 2011 Second leg	Corinthians (Brazil)	1–1 (2–1 agg.)	(Brazil) Santos	São Paulo, SP
21:50 UTC−3	Danilo 47'	Report	Neymar 39'	Stadium: Pacaembu; Attendance: 37,978; Referee: Leandro Vuaden (Brazil)

===== Finals =====
27 June 2012 First leg	Boca Juniors (Argentina)	1–1	(Brazil) Corinthians	Buenos Aires, Argentina
21:55 UTC−3	Roncaglia 72'	Report	Romarinho 84'	Stadium: La Bombonera; Referee: Enrique Osses (Chile)

4 July 2012 Second leg	Corinthians (Brazil)	2–0 (3–1 agg.)	(Argentina) Boca Juniors	São Paulo, SP
21:50 UTC−3	Emerson 53', 72'	Report		Stadium: Pacaembu; Attendance: 40,186; Referee: Wilmar Roldán (Colombia)

== Campeonato Brasileiro ==
=== Results ===
20 May 2012 1	Corinthians	0–1	Fluminense	São Paulo, SP
19:00 UTC−2		Report	72' Euzébio	Stadium: Pacaembu; Attendance: 14,791; Referee: Fabrício Neves Corrêa

27 May 2012 2	Atlético Mineiro	1–0	Corinthians	Belo Horizonte, MG
19:00 UTC−2	Danilinho 65'	Report		Stadium: Independência; Attendance: 14,740; Referee: Wilton Pereira Sampaio

6 June 2012 3	Corinthians	1–1	Figueirense	São Paulo, SP
21:00 UTC−3	Danilo 65'	Report	79' Caio	Stadium: Pacaembu; Attendance: 21,912; Referee: André Luiz de Freitas Castro

10 June 2012 4	Grêmio	2–0	Corinthians	Porto Alegre, RS
21:50 UTC−3	Marco Antônio 22'; Lima 29'	Report		Stadium: Olímpico; Attendance: 20,663; Referee: Evandro Roman

17 June 2012 5	Ponte Preta	1–0	Corinthians	Campinas, SP
21:00 UTC−3	André Luís 42'	Report		Stadium: Moisés Lucarelli; Attendance: 6,316; Referee: Wilson Luiz Seneme

24 June 2012 6	Corinthians	2–1	Palmeiras	São Paulo, SP
20:50 UTC−3	Romarinho 34', 56'	Report	4' Mazinho	Stadium: Pacaembu; Attendance: 17,519; Referee: Luiz Flávio de Oliveira

11 July 2012 7	Corinthians	1–3	Botafogo	São Paulo, SP
19:30 UTC−3	Romarinho (yellow card) 36'; Chicão 89'	Report	28' Paulo André; (yellow card) 34' Lucas Zen; (yellow card) 38' Andrézinho; 56', 69' Elkeson; (yellow card) 78' Lucas; (yellow card) 79' Jefferson	Stadium: Pacaembu; Attendance: 25,900; Referee: Héber Roberto Lopes

8 July 2012 8	Sport	1–1	Corinthians	Recife, PE
20:50 UTC−3	Marquinhos Gabriel 89'	Report	75' Liédson	Stadium: Ilha do Retiro; Attendance: 23,009; Referee: Péricles Bassols Pegado Cortez

14 July 2012 9	Corinthians	2–1	Náutico	São Paulo, SP
19:30 UTC−3	Danilo 22', 50'	Report	20' Elicarlos	Stadium: Pacaembu; Attendance: 25,656; Referee: Wagner Reway

18 July 2012 10	Flamengo	0–3	Corinthians	Rio de Janeiro, RJ
21:50 UTC−3		Report	26', 39' Douglas; 54' Danilo	Stadium: Engenhão; Attendance: 14,897; Referee: Sandro Meira Ricci

21 July 2012 11	Corinthians	1–1	Portuguesa	São Paulo, SP
21:00 UTC−3	Douglas 49'	Report	31' Héverton	Stadium: Pacaembu; Attendance: 31,106; Referee: Leandro Bizzio Marinho

25 July 2012 12	Corinthians	2–0	Cruzeiro	São Paulo, SP
21:50 UTC−3	Chicão 23'; Paulinho 90+3'	Report	(yellow card) 12'Sandro Silva	Stadium: Pacaembu; Attendance: 28,759; Referee: Leandro Pedro Vuaden

29 July 2012 13	Bahia	0–0	Corinthians	Salvador, BA
16:00 UTC−3		Report	Paulinho (yellow card) 86'; Guerrero (yellow card) 90+1'	Stadium: Pituaçu; Attendance: 24,648; Referee: Pablo dos Santos Alves

5 August 2012 14	Vasco da Gama	0–0	Corinthians	Rio de Janeiro, RJ
16:00 UTC−3	Wendel (yellow card) 64'; William Matheus (yellow card) 77'	Report	Alessandro (yellow card) 77'; Paulinho (yellow card) 85'	Stadium: São Januário; Attendance: 19,418; Referee: Paulo Henrique de Godoy Bezerra

8 August 2012 15	Corinthians	1–1	Atlético Goianiense	São Paulo, SP
16:00 UTC−3	Martínez (yellow card) 64'; Paulinho 78'	Report	Gustavo (yellow card) 30'; Bueno 56', (yellow card) 59'; Joílson (yellow card) 61'	Stadium: Pacaembu; Attendance: 24,372; Referee: Anderson Daronco

12 August 2012 16	Coritiba	1–2	Corinthians	Curitiba, PR
16:00 UTC−3	Ribeiro 45+2'; Roberto César (yellow card) 61'; Chico (yellow card) 63'; Escudero (yellow card) 67'	Report	Ralf (yellow card) 38'; Chicão (yellow card) 47'; Paulinho 66', (yellow card) 90'; Danilo (yellow card) 71'; Romarinho (yellow card) 79', (goal) 90'	Stadium: Couto Pereira; Attendance: 16,139; Referee: Leandro Pedro Vuaden

16 August 2012 17	Corinthians	1–0	Internacional	Porto Alegre, RS
21:00 UTC−3	Paulo André (yellow card) 45' (goal) 68'; Alessandro (yellow card) 88'; Martínez (yellow card) 90+2'; Chicão (yellow card) 90+4'	Report	Elton (yellow card) 49'; Dátolo (yellow card) 73'	Stadium: Beira-Rio; Attendance: 27,282; Referee: André Luiz de Freitas Castro

19 August 2012 18	Santos	3–2	Corinthians	Santos, SP
16:00 UTC−3	André 37', 49'; Neymar (yellow card) 45+2'; Ganso (yellow card) 80'; Bruno Rodrigo 84'; Felipe Anderson (yellow card) 90'	Report	Danilo 29'; Paulinho (yellow card) 67'; Douglas (yellow card) 67'; Martínez 81'	Stadium: Vila Belmiro; Attendance: 12,413; Referee: Flavio Rodrigues Guerra

26 August 2012 19	Corinthians	1–2	São Paulo	São Paulo, SP
16:00 UTC−3	Emerson 6'; Paulo André (yellow card) 69'; Romarinho (yellow card) 72'; Chicão (yellow card) 88'	Report	Luís Fabiano 26', 62'; Toloi (yellow card) 39'; Maicon (yellow card) 74'	Stadium: Pacaembu; Attendance: 34,843; Referee: Wilson Luiz Seneme

29 August 2012 20	Fluminense	1–1	Corinthians	Rio de Janeiro, RJ
16:00 UTC−3	Fred (yellow card) 32' (goal) 83'; Neves (yellow card) 45'; Gum (yellow card) 50'	Report	Santos (yellow card) 32'; Emerson 37'; Ralf (yellow card) 57'	Stadium: Engenhão; Attendance: 9,062; Referee: Sandro Meira Ricci

2 September 2012 21	Corinthians	1–0	Atlético Mineiro	São Paulo, SP
17:00 UTC−3	Emerson (yellow card) 15' (yellow-red card) 77'; Douglas (yellow card) 27'; Paulo André 63' (yellow card) 74'; Ramos (yellow card) 89'; Chicão (yellow card) 90+4'; Alessandro (yellow card) 90+6'	Summary	Leandro Donizete (yellow card) 12'; Silva (yellow card) 16'; Ronaldinho (yellow card) 72'; Júnior César (yellow card) 90+1' (yellow-red card) 90+2'; Réver (yellow card) 90+3'	Stadium: Pacaembu; Attendance: 33,375; Referee: Pericles Bassols Pegado Cortez

5 September 2012 22	Figueirense	1–0	Corinthians	Florianópolis, Santa Catarina (state)
23:00 UTC−3	Caio 46'; Aloísio (yellow card) 64'; Roni (yellow card) 66'; Júlio César (yellow card) 90+4'	Summary	Douglas (yellow card) 33'; Chicão (yellow card) 55'	Stadium: Estádio Orlando Scarpelli; Referee: Márcio Chagas da Silva

8 September 2012 23	Corinthians	3–1	Grêmio	São Paulo, SP
22:00 UTC−3	Ralf 6', (yellow card) 76'; Guilherme 11', (yellow card) 31'; Martínez (yellow card) 67'; Danilo (yellow card) 74'; Alessandro (yellow card) 87'; Giovanni 90'	Summary	Zé Roberto (yellow card) 28'; Lima (yellow card) 49'; Leandro 58'	Stadium: Pacaembu; Attendance: 24,850; Referee: Marcelo de Lima Henrique

12 September 2012 24	Corinthians	1–1	Ponte Preta	São Paulo, SP
20:30 UTC−3	Chicão (yellow card) 33'; Guilherme (yellow card) 60'; Alessandro (yellow card) 72'; Santos (yellow card) 86'; Emerson 90'	Summary	Ferron (yellow card) 39'; Alves 68'; Nikão (yellow card) 72'; Cicinho (yellow card) 76'; Édson Bastos (yellow card) 78'	Stadium: Pacaembu; Attendance: 19,844; Referee: Rodrigo Braghetto

16 September 2012 25	Palmeiras	0–2	Corinthians	São Paulo, SP
17:00 UTC−3	Luan (yellow card) 18' (yellow-red card) 26'; Barcos (yellow card) 30'; Artur (yellow card) 36'; Obina (yellow card) 82'; Henrique (yellow card) 90+3'	Summary	Romarinho 22', (yellow card) 24'; Martínez (yellow card) 32'; Cássio (yellow card) 34'; Ralf (yellow card) 47'; Paulinho 54'; Danilo (yellow card) 69'; Santos (yellow card) 83'; Andrade (yellow card) 90+2'	Stadium: Arena Barueri; Referee: Marcelo Aparecido Ribeiro De Souza

23 September 2012 26	Botafogo	2–2	Corinthians	Rio de Janeiro, RJ
16:00 UTC−3	Seedorf 5', 74'		Guerrero 8'; Douglas 12' (pen.)	Stadium: Engenhão; Attendance: 13,755; Referee: Sandro Meira Ricci

30 September 2012 27	Corinthians	3–0	Sport	São Paulo, SP
16:00 UTC−3	Paulinho 54'; Romarinho 70', 85'			Stadium: Pacaembu; Attendance: 25,277; Referee: Jean Pierre Gonçalves Lima

6 October 2012 28	Náutico	2–1	Corinthians	Recife, PE
16:20 UTC−3	Kieza 30'; Ralf 84' (o.g.)		Guerrero 44'	Stadium: Estádio dos Aflitos; Attendance: 17,130; Referee: Héber Roberto Lopes

10 October 2012 29	Corinthians	3–2	Flamengo	São Paulo, SP
22:00 UTC−3	Edenílson 60'; Paulo André 75'; Emerson 89'		Santos 29'; Liédson	Stadium: Pacaembu; Attendance: 25,395; Referee: Fabrício Neves Corrêa

13 October 2012 30	Portuguesa	1–1	Corinthians	São Paulo, SP
21:00 UTC−3	Cordeiro 12'		Douglas 16'	Stadium: Estádio do Canindé; Attendance: 7,397; Referee: Rodrigo Braghetto

17 October 2012 31	Cruzeiro	2–0	Corinthians	Varginha, MG
22:00 UTC−3	Anselmo Ramon 20'; Martinuccio 60'			Stadium: Estádio Melão; Attendance: 7,223; Referee: Jaílson Macedo Freitas

20 October 2012 32	Corinthians	1–1	Bahia	São Paulo, SP
18:30 UTC−3	Douglas 11' (pen.)		Fahel 32'	Stadium: Pacaembu; Attendance: 20,250; Referee: Wilton Pereira Sampaio

27 October 2012 33	Corinthians	1–0	Vasco da Gama	São Paulo, SP
16:20 UTC−3	Guerrero 58'			Stadium: Pacaembu; Attendance: 24,376; Referee: Leandro Pedro Vuaden

4 November 2012 34	Atlético Goianiense	0–2	Corinthians	Taguatinga, DF
17:00 UTC−3			Martínez 53'; Guilherme 90'	Stadium: Estádio Boca do Jacaré; Attendance: 8,931; Referee: Dewson Fernando Freitas da Silva

10 November 2012 35	Corinthians	5–1	Coritiba	São Paulo, SP
21:00 UTC−3	Chicão 5' (pen.); Santos 18'; Paulinho 19', 68'; Guerrero 64'		Deivid 31'	Stadium: Pacaembu; Attendance: 22,006; Referee: Ronan Marques da Rosa

18 November 2012 36	Internacional	0–2	Corinthians	Porto Alegre, RS
19:30 UTC−3			Guerrero 45+2'; Edenílson 90'	Stadium: Estádio Beira-Rio; Attendance: 6,850; Referee: Wagner do Nascimento Magalhães

24 November 2012 37	Corinthians	1–1	Santos	São Paulo, SP
19:30 UTC−3	Wallace 79'		Felipe Anderson 35'	Stadium: Pacaembu; Attendance: 34,171; Referee: Raphael Claus

2 December 2012 38	São Paulo	3–1	Corinthians	São Paulo, SP
17:00 UTC−3	Douglas 14'; Maicon 23' 76'		Guerrero 12'	Stadium: Pacaembu; Attendance: 22,436; Referee: Rodrigo Braghetto

=== Standings ===
Pos	Team	Pld	W	D	L	GF	GA	GD	Pts	Qualification or relegation
4	São Paulo	38	20	6	12	59	37	+22	66	2013 Copa Libertadores First Stage
5	Vasco da Gama	38	16	10	12	45	44	+1	58	
6	Corinthians	38	15	12	11	51	39	+12	57	2013 Copa Libertadores Second Stage (Note: Corinthians qualified for the second stage of the 2013 Copa Libertadores as the 2012 Copa Libertadores champion.)
7	Botafogo	38	15	10	13	60	50	+10	55	
8	Santos	38	13	14	11	50	44	+6	53	

Updated to match(es) played on unknown. Source: UOL.com.br
Rules for classification: 1st points; 2nd wins; 3rd goal difference; 4th goals scored; 5th head-to-head results; 6th least red cards received; 7th least yellow cards received; 8th draw

=== Results summary ===
Overall								Home						Away					
Pld	W	D	L	GF	GA	GD	Pts	W	D	L	GF	GA	GD	W	D	L	GF	GA	GD
38	15	12	11	51	39	+12	57	10	6	3	31	18	+13	5	6	8	20	21	−1

== FIFA Club World Cup ==
=== Matches ===
==== Semi-final ====
12 December 2012	Al-Ahly (Egypt)	0–1	(Brazil) Corinthians	Toyota
19:30 UTC+9		Report	Guerrero 30'	Stadium: Toyota Stadium; Attendance: 31,417; Referee: Marco Rodríguez (Mexico)

==== Final ====
16 December 2012	Corinthians (Brazil)	1–0	(England) Chelsea	Yokohama
19:30 UTC+9	Guerrero 69'	Report		Stadium: International Stadium Yokohama; Attendance: 68,275; Referee: Cüneyt Çakır (Turkey)

Corinthians won the tournament after defeating Al-Ahly 1–0 in the semi-final and Chelsea 1–0 in the final.

== Squad ==
As July 24, 2012.

Note: Flags indicate national team as defined under FIFA eligibility rules; some limited exceptions apply. Players may hold more than one non-FIFA nationality.

No.	Pos.	Nation	Player
1	GK	BRA	Júlio César
2	DF	BRA	Alessandro
3	DF	BRA	Chicão
4	DF	BRA	Wallace
5	MF	BRA	Ralf
6	DF	BRA	Fábio Santos
7	FW	ARG	Juan Manuel Martínez
8	MF	BRA	Paulinho
9	FW	PER	Paolo Guerrero
10	MF	BRA	Douglas
11	FW	BRA	Emerson
12	GK	BRA	Cássio
13	DF	BRA	Paulo André
14	MF	PER	Luis Ramírez
15	DF	BRA	Marquinhos

No.	Pos.	Nation	Player
16	DF	BRA	Denner
17	MF	BRA	Willian Arão
18	DF	BRA	Weldinho
19	FW	BRA	Élton
20	MF	BRA	Danilo
21	MF	BRA	Edenílson
22	GK	BRA	Danilo Fernandes
23	FW	BRA	Jorge Henrique
25	FW	BRA	Adilson
26	DF	BRA	Guilherme
27	DF	BRA	Antonio Carlos
28	DF	BRA	Felipe
29	MF	BRA	Giovanni
31	FW	BRA	Romarinho
—	FW	CHN	Chen Zhizhao

== Statistics ==
No.	Pos.	Name	Apps	Goals	Apps	Goals	Apps	Goals	Apps	Goals
No.	Pos.	Name	Brasileirao		Paulistao		Libertadores		Total	
1	GK	(Brazil) Júlio César	2	0	15	0	6	0	23	0
2	DF	(Brazil) Alessandro	2	0	8	1	9	0	19	1
3	DF	(Brazil) Chicão	2	0	11	2	14	0	27	2
4	DF	(Brazil) Wallace	2	0	13	0	14	0	29	0
5	MF	(Brazil) Ralf	2	0	15	0	14	1	31	1
6	DF	(Brazil) Fábio Santos	2	0	14	0	14	1	30	1
7	MF	(Brazil) Willian	5	0	14	5	8	0	27	5
8	MF	(Brazil) Paulinho	1	0	15	3	14	3	30	6
9	FW	(Portugal) Liédson	5	0	11	2	11	1	27	3
11	FW	(Brazil) Emerson	1	0	6	3	13	5	20	8
12	DF	(Brazil) Alex	2	0	10	1	12	1	22	2
13	DF	(Brazil) Willian Arão	5	0	1	0	0	0	6	0
14	FW	(Brazil) Luis Ramírez	2	0	13	2	1	0	16	2
15	DF	(Brazil) Douglas	6	0	12	0	5	1	17	1
16	DF	(Brazil) Ramon	5	0	6	2	0	0	11	2
17	MF	(Brazil) Gilsinho	3	0	13	1	0	0	16	1
18	DF	(Brazil) Weldinho	4	0	9	1	2	0	15	1
19	DF	(Brazil) Élton	5	0	15	2	7	1	27	3
20	MF	(Brazil) Danilo	2	1	12	2	14	4	28	7
21	FW	(Brazil) Edenílson	0	0	13	0	7	0	20	0
22	GK	(Brazil) Danilo Fernandes	1	0	4	0	0	0	5	0
23	DF	(Brazil) Jorge Henrique	1	0	9	0	13	3	23	0
24	DF	(Brazil) Cássio	3	0	1	0	8	0	12	0
25	FW	(Brazil) Wallace	3	0	5	0	3	0	11	0
26	MF	(Brazil) Denner	0	0	0	0	0	0	0	0
28	FW	(Brazil) Marquinhos	4	0	8	0	0	0	12	0
29	DF	(Brazil) Adilson	4	0	0	0	0	0	4	0
31	MF	(Brazil) Matheus	0	0	1	0	0	0	1	0
31	FW	(Brazil) Romarinho	3	2	0	0	1	1	4	3
32	FW	(Brazil) Antônio Carlos	3	0	2	0	0	0	5	0
33	DF	(Brazil) Felipe	1	0	1	0	0	0	2	0
35	DF	(Brazil) Giovanni	0	0	1	0	0	0	1	0
36	DF	(Brazil) Paulo André	1	0	1	0	0	0	2	0
-	FW	(China) Chen Zhizhao	0	0	0	0	0	0	0	0
-	FW	(Peru) Paolo Guerrero	0	0	0	0	0	0	0	0

Last Updated June 26, 2012

=== Discipline ===
No.	Pos.	Name	Yellow card	Double yellow card	Red card	Yellow card	Double yellow card	Red card	Yellow card	Double yellow card	Red card	Yellow card	Double yellow card	Red card
No.	Pos.	Name	Brasilerao			Paulistao			Libertadores			Total		
1	GK	(Brazil) Júlio César	0	0	0	0	0	0	0	0	0	0	0	0
2	DF	(Brazil) Alessandro	0	0	0	1	0	0	4	0	0	5	0	0
3	DF	(Brazil) Chicão	0	0	0	3	0	0	4	0	0	7	0	0
4	DF	(Brazil) Wallace	1	0	0	1	0	0	4	0	0	5	0	0
5	MF	(Brazil) Ralf	0	0	0	2	0	0	1	0	0	3	0	0
6	DF	(Brazil) Fábio Santos	1	1	0	0	0	0	2	0	0	3	1	0
7	MF	(Brazil) Willian	1	0	0	3	0	0	1	0	0	5	0	0
8	MF	(Brazil) Paulinho	0	0	0	4	0	0	3	0	0	7	0	0
9	FW	(Portugal) Liédson	1	0	0	3	0	0	0	0	0	4	0	0
11	FW	(Qatar) Emerson	1	0	0	0	0	0	5	1	0	6	1	0
12	DF	(Brazil) Alex	0	0	0	1	0	0	0	0	0	1	0	0
13	DF	(Brazil) Willian Arão	1	0	0	1	0	0	0	0	0	2	0	0
14	FW	(Peru) Luis Ramírez	1	0	0	0	0	0	0	0	0	1	0	0
15	DF	(Brazil) Douglas	2	0	0	0	0	0	0	0	0	2	0	0
16	DF	(Brazil) Ramon	1	0	0	2	0	0	0	0	0	3	0	0
17	MF	(Brazil) Gilsinho	0	0	0	2	0	0	0	0	0	2	0	0
18	DF	(Brazil) Weldinho	0	0	0	1	0	0	0	0	0	1	0	0
19	DF	(Brazil) Élton	0	0	0	4	0	0	0	0	0	4	0	0
20	MF	(Brazil) Danilo	0	0	0	1	0	0	2	0	0	3	0	0
21	FW	(Brazil) Edenílson	0	0	0	0	0	0	1	0	0	1	0	0
22	GK	(Brazil) Danilo Fernandes	0	0	0	0	0	0	0	0	0	0	0	0
23	DF	(Brazil) Jorge Henrique	1	0	0	1	0	0	4	1	0	6	1	0
24	DF	(Brazil) Cássio	0	0	0	0	0	0	1	0	0	1	0	0
25	FW	(Brazil) Wallace	0	0	0	1	0	0	0	0	0	1	0	0
26	MF	(Brazil) Denner	0	0	0	0	0	0	0	0	0	0	0	0
28	FW	(Brazil) Marquinhos	0	0	0	0	0	0	0	0	0	0	0	0
29	DF	(Brazil) Adilson	0	0	0	0	0	0	0	0	0	0	0	0
31	FW	(Brazil) Romarinho	0	0	0	0	0	0	0	0	0	0	0	0
32	FW	(Brazil) Antônio Carlos	1	0	0	1	0	0	0	0	0	2	0	0
33	DF	(Brazil) Felipe	0	0	0	0	0	0	0	0	0	0	0	0
35	DF	(Brazil) Giovanni	0	0	0	0	0	0	0	0	0	0	0	0
36	DF	(Brazil) Paulo André	0	0	0	0	0	0	0	0	0	0	0	0
-	FW	(China) Chen Zhizhao	0	0	0	0	0	0	0	0	0	0	0	0
-	FW	(Peru) Paolo Guerrero	0	0	0	0	0	0	0	0	0	0	0	0

Last Updated June 26, 2012

== Transfers ==
=== Permanent ===
Date	Pos.	Name	From	Fee	Notes
15 December 2011	FW	Gilsinho	Júbilo Iwata	Free transfer	
15 December 2011	FW	Vitor Júnior	Atlético Goianiense	Free transfer	
28 December 2011	GK	Cássio	PSV	Free transfer	
28 December 2011	FW	Élton	Vasco da Gama	Undisclosed	
7 January 2011	MF	Douglas	Grêmio	R$3,000,000	
31 May 2012	FW	Romarinho	Bragantino	R$1,750,000	
11 July 2012	FW	Paolo Guerrero	Hamburger SV	R$7,500,000	
14 July 2012	FW	Juan Manuel Martínez	Vélez Sársfield	R$6,000,000	

Date	Pos.	Name	To	Fee	Notes
7 January 2012	FW	Moradei	São Caetano	Free transfer	
7 January 2012	MF	Bruno Octávio	Paulista	Free transfer	
24 January 2012	DF	Diego Sacoman	Ponte Preta	Free transfer	
31 January 2012	MF	Edno	Tigres UANL	R$5,000,000	
21 May 2012	FW	Bill	Santos	Free transfer	
6 July 2012	FW	Leandro Castán	Roma	R$13,000,000	
9 July 2012	FW	William	Metalist Kharkiv	R$4,000,000	
16 July 2012	FW	Alex	Al-Gharafa	R$15,000,000	

Transfer Net: ▲ R$18.75m (€7.5m/$9.4m)

=== Loan ===
Date	Pos.	Name	From	Fee	Notes
31 December 2011	MF	Chen Zhizhao	Nanchang Hengyuan	End of 2013	
14 May 2012	DF	Guilherme	Ponte Preta	End of Season	

Date	Pos.	Name	To	Duration	Notes
18 December 2012	DF	Marcelo Oliveira	Cruzeiro	End of season	
4 January 2012	MF	Taubaté	Botafogo-SP	End of season	
5 January 2012	MF	Morais	Bahia	End of season	
7 January 2012	GK	Rafael Santos	Bragantino	End of season	
17 January 2012	MF	Renan	Vitória	End of season	
29 January 2012	MF	André Vinicius	Paraná	End of season	
7 February 2012	FW	Elias Fernandes	Paraná	Free transfer	
4 May 2012	FW	Vitor Júnior	Botafogo	End of season	
1 June 2012	MF	Nenê Bonilha	Avai	End of season	
10 June 2012	MF	Gomes	Botafogo-SP	End of season	
10 June 2012	MF	Matheus	Botafogo-SP	End of season	

== Manufacturer and sponsors ==
Corinthians began the 2012 Season with Johnson & Johnson Brazilian consumer brand Jontex as its main sponsor. When Corinthians initiated the 2012 Libertadores Campaign a month later, Fiat subsidiary Iveco (Chest) became the main sponsor alongside Fisk (Back), Marabraz (Sleeves), & Bom Brill (Shoulders). Prior to the Libertadores Final Iveco approached Corinthians in an attempt to become the exclusive sponsor of Timão, Corinthians rebuffed stating that such a deal would be out of Iveco's financial reach. The latest prices for Corinthians Shirt sponsorships are as follows: (Chest & Back) R$30m (€12m/$15m), Sleeves R$15m (€6m/$7.5m), Shoulders R$8m (€3.2m/$4m), for a total of R$53m (€21.3m/$26.5m). On July 7, 2012, it was announced that Corinthians was close to signing an exclusive sponsorship deal lasting until the end of 2012, worth R$68m (€27.3m/$34m). This would place Corinthians as the second most expensive shirt in the world, ahead of Juventus (Tamoil) & behind Manchester United (Nike).

Period	Kit manufacturer	Shirt partner
2012	Nike	Jontex
2012	Nike	Neo Química
2012	Nike	Iveco
2012	Nike	SOS Mata Atlântica
2012	Nike	AfroReggae

== See also ==
- List of Sport Club Corinthians Paulista seasons
