= Jorge Henrique =

Jorge Henrique may refer to:

- Jorge Henrique (footballer, born April 1982), Jorge Henrique de Souza, Brazilian football winger
- Jorge Henrique (footballer, born October 1982), Jorge Henrique de Almeida Leão, Brazilian football winger
