= Cássio (footballer, born 1987) =

Brazilian football goalkeeper

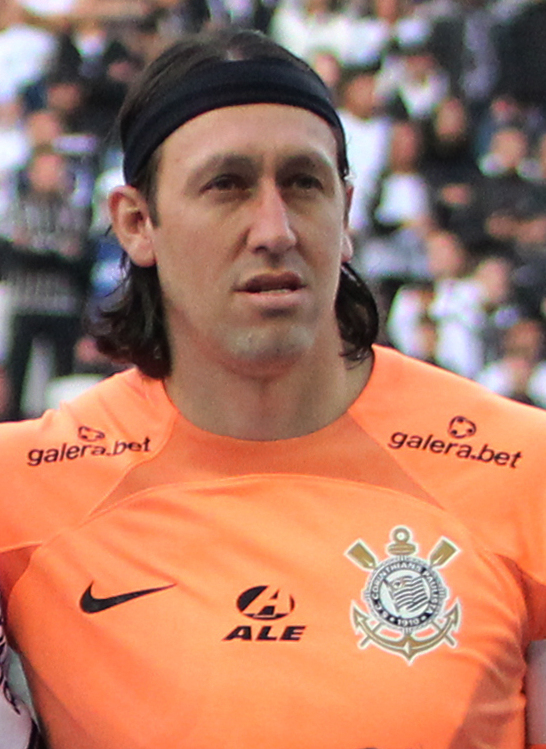
- Cássio with Corinthians in 2022

Personal information
- Full name: Cássio Roberto Ramos
- Date of birth: 6 June 1987 (age 39)
- Place of birth: Veranópolis, Rio Grande do Sul, Brazil
- Height: 1.95 m (6 ft 5 in)
- Position: Goalkeeper

Team information
- Current team: Cruzeiro
- Number: 1

Youth career
- 2004–2005: Grêmio

Senior career*
Years	Team	Apps	(Gls)
2006–2007	Grêmio	3	(0)
2007–2011	PSV	3	(0)
2009	→ Sparta Rotterdam (loan)	14	(0)
2012–2024	Corinthians	548	(0)
2024–	Cruzeiro	78	(0)

International career^{‡}
2007	Brazil U20	11	(0)
2017-2019	Brazil	1	(0)
Medal record
Men's football
Representing Brazil
Copa América
Winner	2019 Brazil
South American Youth Championship
Winner	2007 Paraguay
- * Club domestic league appearances and goals as of 11 March 2026 ‡ National team caps and goals as of 3 June 2018

Cássio Roberto Ramos (born 6 June 1987), simply known as Cássio, is a Brazilian professional footballer who plays as a goalkeeper for Cruzeiro.

Cássio began his career at the academy of Grêmio in his home state of Rio Grande do Sul and was quickly promoted to the club's first team. He then spent some time in the Netherlands for PSV, where he won two trophies, and Sparta Rotterdam, before joining Corinthians in 2012.

Until his departure for Cruzeiro in May 2024, Cássio has made over 700 appearances for Corinthians and won two Brasileirão titles, four Campeonato Paulista titles, a Copa Libertadores, a Recopa Sudamericana and a FIFA Club World Cup in 2012, where the Timão beat Chelsea in the final. Cássio himself was named man of the match and also awarded the tournament's Golden Ball. Since 2019, he is Corinthians' most decorated player in their history.

Cássio was a Brazilian international from 2007 to 2019 and played at two major tournaments, the 2018 FIFA World Cup and the 2019 Copa América, which Brazil won at home.

== Club career ==
=== Grêmio ===
Born in Veranópolis, Rio Grande do Sul, Cássio was a Grêmio youth graduate. He made his first team debut on 12 February 2006, in a 2–1 Campeonato Gaúcho home win over Santa Cruz-RS.

Cássio made his debut in the Brasileirão on 26 October 2006, replacing the injured Rodrigo Galatto in a 2–1 away win over Fluminense. He spent the remainder of his time at Grêmio as the club's third-choice goalkeeper behind Marcelo Grohe and Galatto, who were also youth graduates.

=== PSV Eindhoven ===
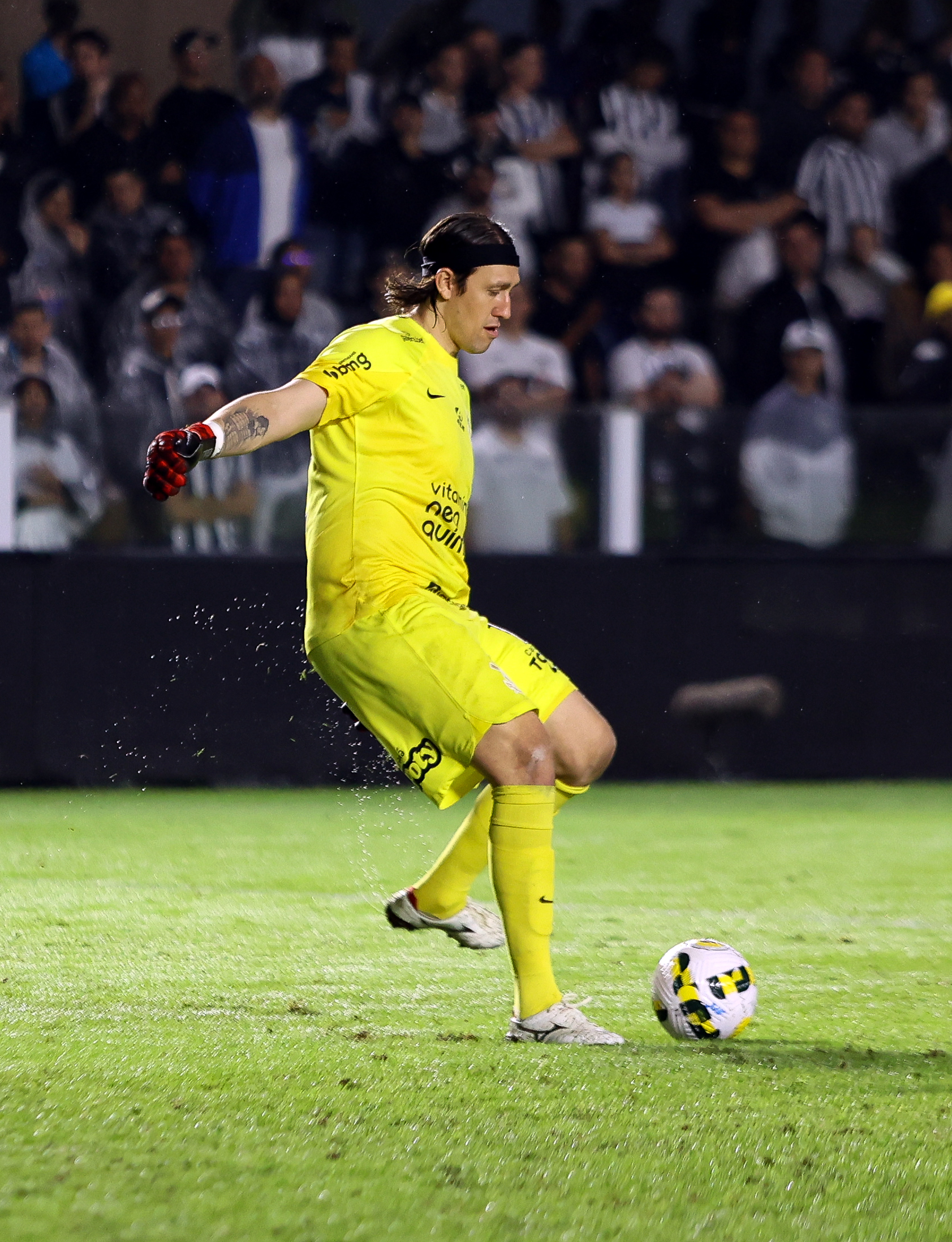
Cássio playing for Corinthians in 2022

He started his first game for PSV in January 2009. Soon after, the 21-year-old former Brazilian U-20 national squad goalkeeper moved to Sparta Rotterdam until the end of the season. In the 2011–12 season he played at the second team. On 28 September 2011 his contract was terminated by mutual consent and Cássio returned to Brazil.

=== Corinthians ===
In the end of 2011, after terminating his contract with PSV Eindhoven, Cássio signed with Corinthians. On 27 April 2012, he was made Corinthians' first-choice goalkeeper, replacing Júlio César, the former number one goalkeeper at the club. He made his debut in the Libertadores 2012 on 2 May 2012, in a game against Emelec in the round-of-16. The result was a goalless draw and Cássio was elected Man of the Match following a great display. He went on to make 7 more appearances for Corinthians in the competition, helping the team become champions against Boca Juniors in the finals, including a miraculous save against an Diego Souza's shoot of the Vasco da Gama in the second-leg of the quarter-finals. On 16 December 2012, Cássio helped Corinthians beat Chelsea by the score of 1–0 in the FIFA Club World Cup. He was later rewarded the golden ball for the tournament due to his brilliant performances during the competition.

On 17 May 2024, Cássio announced he would be leaving the club after twelve seasons.

== International career ==
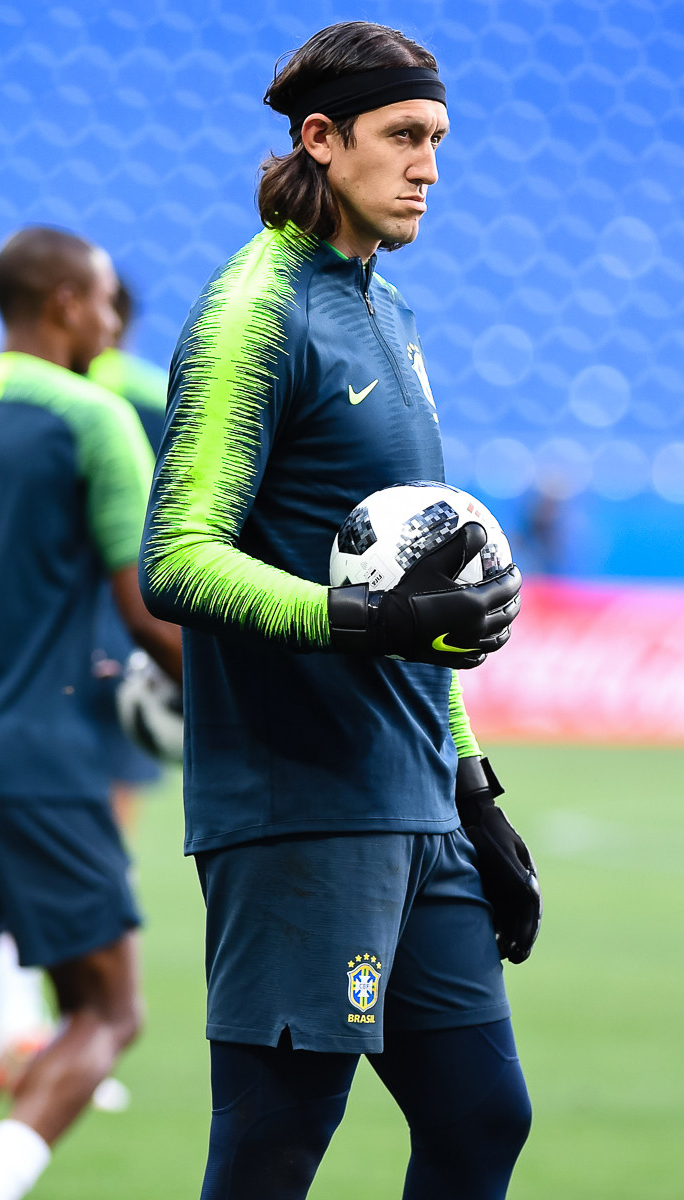
Cássio training with Brazil at the 2018 FIFA World Cup

He has been capped at Under-20 level for Brazil and played for the U-20 World Cup in Canada.

The first call came in 2007 by Dunga for two friendly matches against Chile and Ghana. He was 19 years old and was called up due to Helton's injury; and also because Dunga was calling some players under the Olympic age to prepare for the 2008 Summer Olympics. Eventually, he did make it to the preliminary squad for Beijing, but lost out on a place in the final list to Renan and Diego Alves.

In August 2012, Cássio was called up by Mano Menezes for two friendlies against South Africa and China.

He was called up by Brazil coach Dunga in 2015 for two games of 2018 FIFA World Cup qualification and was called up again three times by Tite in the second semester of 2017 for four consecutive games of the 2018 FIFA World Cup qualification and two friendlies. He was given his first cap on 10 November 2017, coming in as a substitute for Alisson for the second half of the friendly against Japan. His participation was minimal due to Japan's limited attempts on goal, but he ended up conceding two goals from Makino and Sugimoto, though the latter's was nullified.

In May 2018, he was named in the final 23-man squad for the 2018 FIFA World Cup in Russia. He also was part of the 2019 Copa América's winning squad.

== Career statistics ==
=== Club ===
As of match played 11 March 2026

Appearances by club, season and competition
Club	Season	League			State League		National Cup		Continental		Other		Total	
Club	Season	Division	Apps	Goals	Apps	Goals	Apps	Goals	Apps	Goals	Apps	Goals	Apps	Goals
Grêmio	2006	Série A	1	0	2	0	—		—		—		3	0
PSV	2007–08	Eredivisie	0	0	—		—		—		—		0	0
PSV	2008–09	Eredivisie	1	0	—		1	0	—		—		2	0
PSV	2009–10	Eredivisie	0	0	—		0	0	—		—		0	0
PSV	2010–11	Eredivisie	2	0	—		0	0	1 (Note: Appearance in UEFA Europa League)	0	–		3	0
PSV	Total		3	0	—		1	0	1	0	—		5	0
Sparta Rotterdam (loan)	2008–09	Eredivisie	14	0	—		0	0	—		—		14	0
Corinthians	2012	Série A	32	0	1	0	0	0	8 (Note: Appearances in Copa Libertadores)	0	2 (Note: Appearances in FIFA Club World Cup)	0	43	0
Corinthians	2013	Série A	29	0	8	0	3	0	7	0	2 (Note: Appearances in Recopa Sudamericana)	0	49	0
Corinthians	2014	Série A	35	0	8	0	8	0	—		—		51	0
Corinthians	2015	Série A	35	0	13	0	2	0	10	0	—		60	0
Corinthians	2016	Série A	21	0	13	0	2	0	8	0	—		44	0
Corinthians	2017	Série A	35	0	17	0	6	0	6 (Note: Appearances in Copa Sudamericana)	0	—		64	0
Corinthians	2018	Série A	27	0	18	0	8	0	7	0	—		60	0
Corinthians	2019	Série A	32	0	18	0	7	0	10	0	—		67	0
Corinthians	2020	Série A	36	0	15	0	2	0	2	0	—		55	0
Corinthians	2021	Série A	37	0	11	0	4	0	6	0	—		58	0
Corinthians	2022	Série A	34	0	12	0	9	0	9	0	—		64	0
Corinthians	2023	Série A	37	0	11	0	8	0	10 (Note: Four appearances in Copa Libertadores, six appearances in Copa Sudamericana)	0	—		66	0
Corinthians	2024	Série A	3	0	10	0	1	0	3	0	—		17	0
Corinthians	Total		393	0	155	0	60	0	86	0	4	0	698	0
Cruzeiro	2024	Série A	21	0	—		—		7	0	—		28	0
Cruzeiro	2025	Série A	35	0	8	0	8	0	4	0	—		55	0
Cruzeiro	2026	Série A	5	0	9	0	0	0	0	0	—		14	0
Cruzeiro	Total		61	0	17	0	8	0	11	0	—		97	0
Career total			472	0	174	0	69	0	98	0	4	0	817	0

=== International ===
As of 8 December 2023

Appearances and goals by national team and year
National team	Year	Apps	Goals
Brazil	2007	0	0
Brazil	2008	0	0
Brazil	2009	0	0
Brazil	2010	0	0
Brazil	2011	0	0
Brazil	2012	0	0
Brazil	2013	0	0
Brazil	2014	0	0
Brazil	2015	0	0
Brazil	2016	0	0
Brazil	2017	1	0
Brazil	2018	0	0
Brazil	2019	0	0
Total		1	0

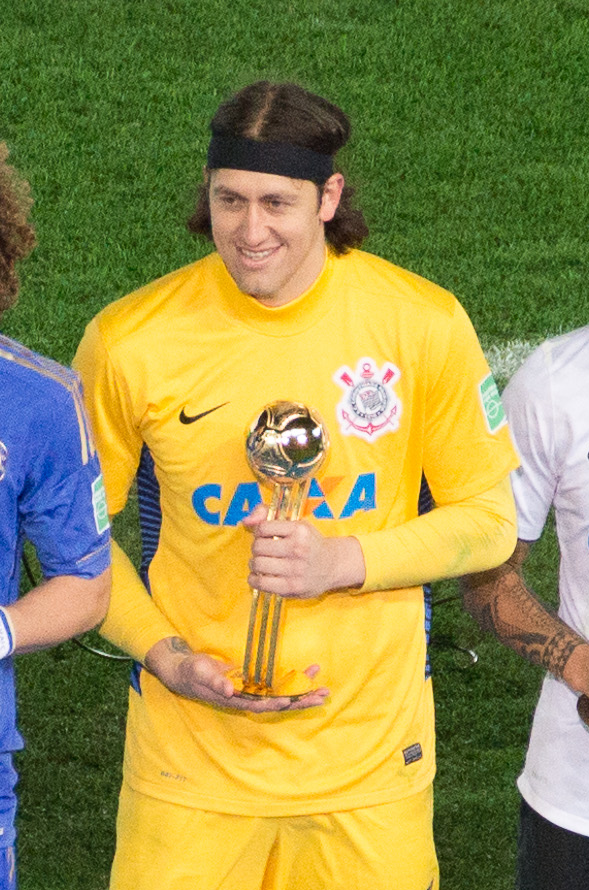
Cássio accepting his individual award after the 2012 FIFA Club World Cup Final

== Honours ==
Grêmio

- Campeonato Gaúcho: 2006

PSV

- Eredivisie: 2007–08
- Johan Cruyff Shield: 2008

Corinthians

- Copa Libertadores: 2012
- FIFA Club World Cup: 2012
- Campeonato Paulista: 2013, 2017, 2018, 2019
- Recopa Sudamericana: 2013
- Campeonato Brasileiro Série A: 2015, 2017

Brazil

- Copa América: 2019

Individual

- Campeonato Brasileiro Série A Team of the Year: 2015
- Best Goalkeeper in Brazil: 2015, 2017, 2022
- Campeonato Paulista Team of the Year: 2019

== Literature ==
- Celso Unzelte: "Cássio: a trajetória do maior goleiro da história do Corinthians", Universo dos Livros, São Paulo, 2019. ISBN 855030462X
