= Danilo (footballer, born 1979) =

Brazilian association football player and coach

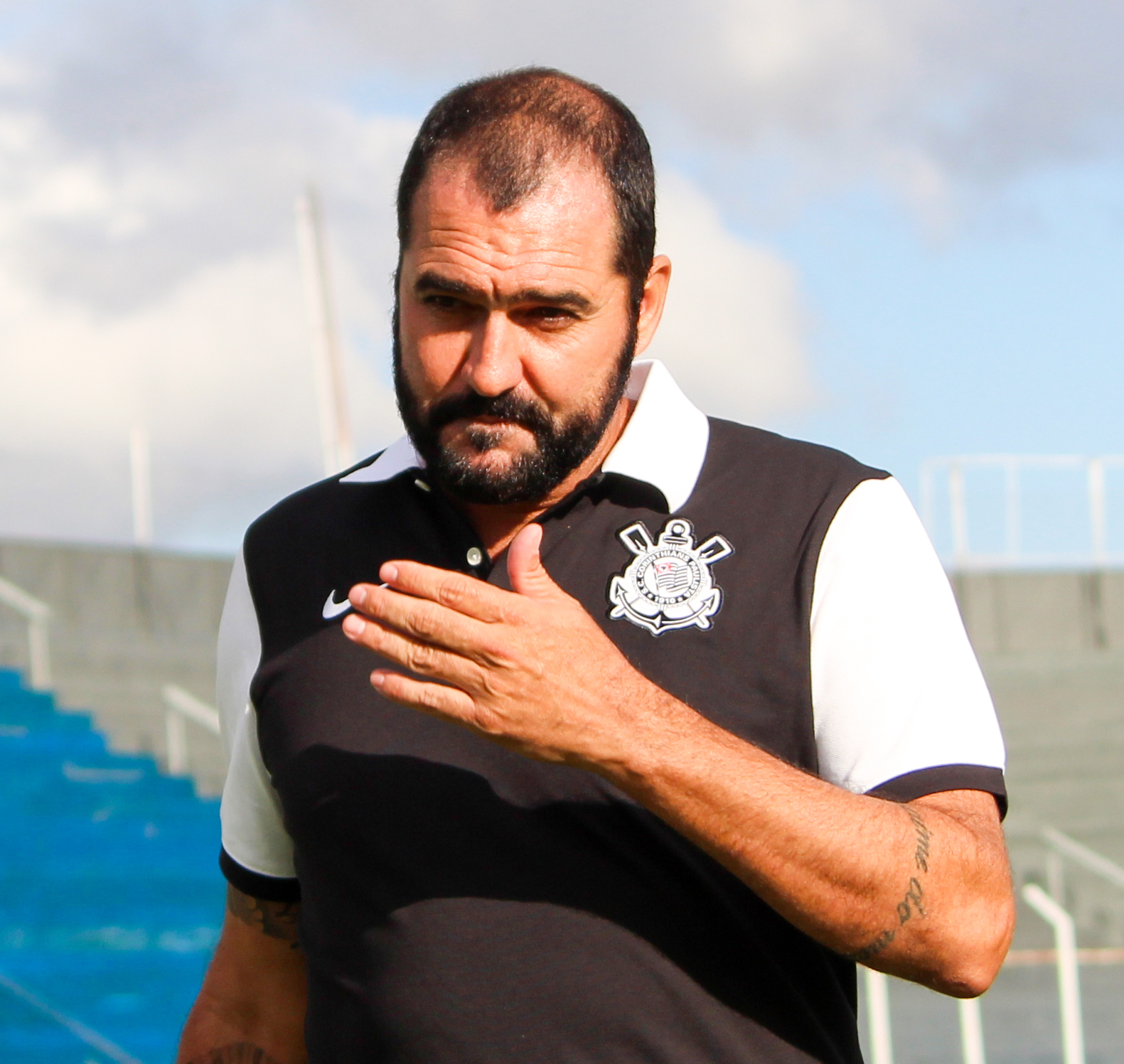
- Danilo as head coach of Corinthians U20 in 2022

Personal information
- Full name: Danilo Gabriel de Andrade
- Date of birth: 11 June 1979 (age 47)
- Place of birth: São Gotardo, Brazil
- Height: 1.86 m (6 ft 1 in)
- Position: Midfielder

Team information
- Current team: Uberlândia (head coach)

Youth career
- 1996–1999: Goiás

Senior career*
Years	Team	Apps	(Gls)
1999–2003	Goiás	144	(31)
2003–2006	São Paulo	144	(30)
2007–2009	Kashima Antlers	77	(6)
2010–2018	Corinthians	284	(27)
2019	Vila Nova	11	(1)
Total		665	(95)

Managerial career
- 2021: Corinthians U23
- 2022–2024: Corinthians U20
- 2023: Corinthians (caretaker)
- 2026: Pouso Alegre
- 2026–: Uberlândia
- * Club domestic league appearances and goals

Danilo Gabriel de Andrade (born 11 June 1979), simply known as Danilo, is a Brazilian professional football coach and former player who played as an attacking midfielder. He is the current head coach of Uberlândia.

Danilo made over 450 appearances in a 20-year playing career, during which he was mainly associated with São Paulo and Corinthians. He twice won the Copa Libertadores and the FIFA Club World Cup, as is a four-time Brazilian league champion.

Danilo is considered by pundits to be the greatest player who was never called up to the Brazil national team. He was known for his technique, vision and goalscoring abilities, which earned him the nickname Zidanilo, in homage to Zinedine Zidane.

== Coaching career ==
In January 2021, Danilo was appointed as Corinthians' new U23 coach. He took over the under-20 side on 31 January of the following year, replacing sacked Diogo Siston.

On 28 April 2023, Danilo was named interim head coach of the first team, after Cuca resigned.

== Career statistics ==
Club	Season	League			State League		Cup		Continental		Other		Total	
Club	Season	Division	Apps	Goals	Apps	Goals	Apps	Goals	Apps	Goals	Apps	Goals	Apps	Goals
Goiás	1999	Série B	1	0	4	0	2	0	—		—		7	0
Goiás	2000	Série A	15	1	21	3	5	1	—		5 (Note: Four appearances in Copa Centro-Oeste, one appearance in Copa dos Campeões)	0	46	5
Goiás	2001	Série A	23	3	18	9	4	3	—		10 (Note: Eight appearances and two goals in Copa Centro-Oeste, two appearances in Copa dos Campeões)	2	55	17
Goiás	2002	Série A	24	2	6	2	2	0	—		20 (Note: Sixteen appearances and six goals in Copa Centro-Oeste, four appearances in Copa dos Campeões)	6	52	10
Goiás	2003	Série A	22	2	15	9	9	3	—		—		46	14
Goiás	Total		85	8	64	23	22	7	—		35	8	206	46
São Paulo	2004	Série A	40	8	9	0	—		16 (Note: Twelve appearances and one goal in Copa Libertadores, four appearances in Copa Sudamericana)	1	—		65	9
São Paulo	2005	Série A	31	6	16	4	—		13 (Note: Appearance(s) in Copa Libertadores)	3	2 (Note: Appearance(s) in FIFA Club World Cup)	0	62	13
São Paulo	2006	Série A	29	4	19	8	—		14	3	2 (Note: Appearance(s) in Recopa Sudamericana)	0	64	15
São Paulo	Total		100	18	44	12	—		43	8	4	0	191	37
Kashima Antlers	2007	J1 League	26	0	—		4	0	—		9 (Note: Appearance(s) in J.League Cup)	0	39	1
Kashima Antlers	2008	J1 League	28	4	—		1	1	8 (Note: Appearance(s) in AFC Champions League)	5	2	0	39	10
Kashima Antlers	2009	J1 League	23	2	—		3	2	3	0	2	0	31	4
Kashima Antlers	Total		77	6	—		8	3	11	5	13	0	109	15
Corinthians	2010	Série A	31	2	7	1	—		7	0	—		45	3
Corinthians	2011	Série A	36	3	13	1	—		2	0	—		51	4
Corinthians	2012	Série A	24	5	12	2	—		14	4	2	0	52	11
Corinthians	2013	Série A	30	0	15	4	4	0	8	1	2	1	59	6
Corinthians	2014	Série A	23	2	13	0	5	0	—		—		41	2
Corinthians	2015	Série A	29	0	11	3	1	0	8	0	—		49	3
Corinthians	2016	Série A	6	1	14	1	0	0	4	0	—		24	2
Corinthians	2017	Série A	2	0	0	0	0	0	0	0	—		2	0
Corinthians	2018	Série A	13	2	5	0	0	0	0	0	—		18	2
Corinthians	Total		194	15	90	12	10	0	43	5	4	1	341	33
Vila Nova	2019	Série B	0	0	11	1	4	2	—		—		15	3
Career total			456	47	209	48	44	12	97	18	56	9	862	134

== Honours ==
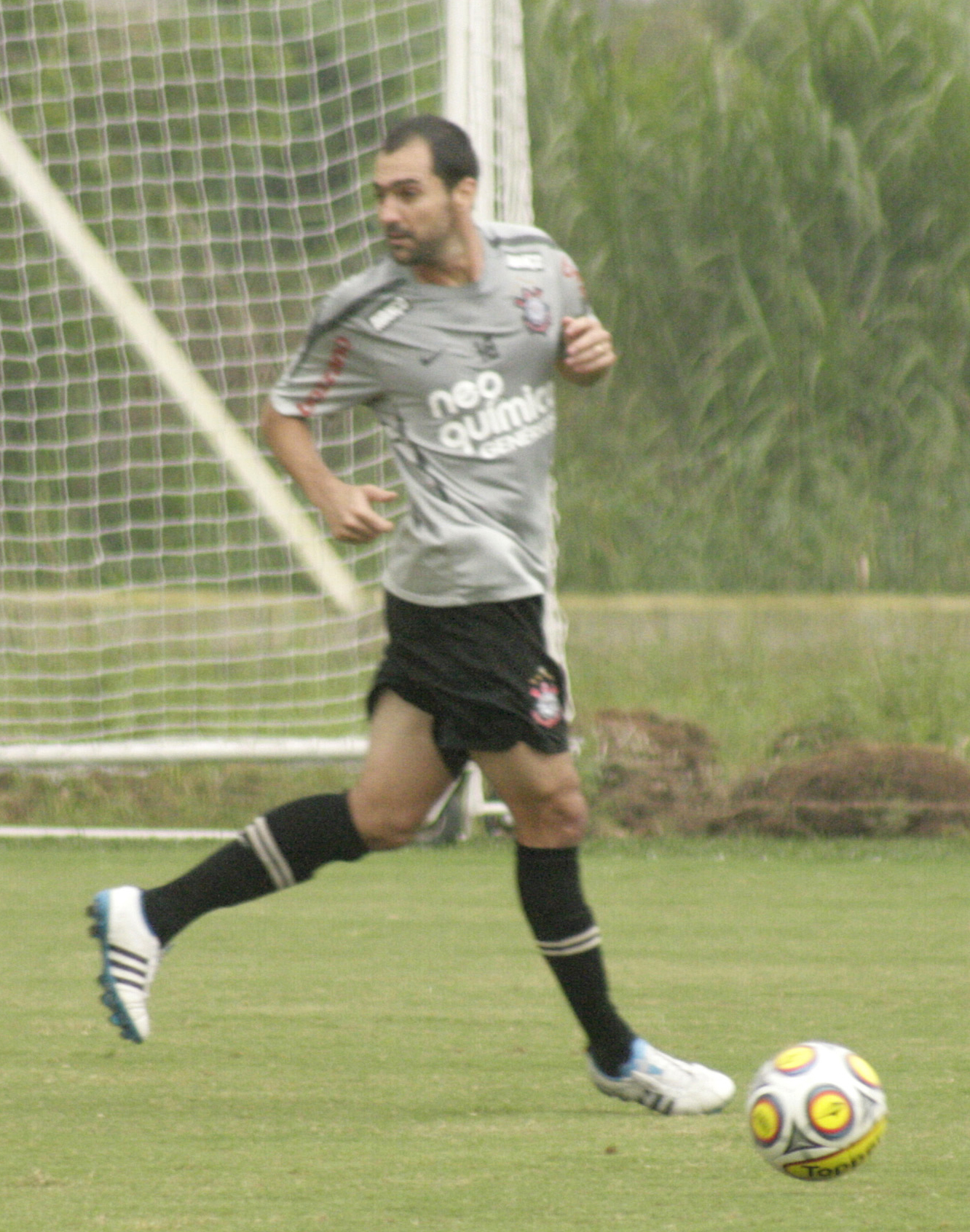
Danilo with Corinthians in 2011

=== Player ===
Goiás

- Campeonato Brasileiro Série B: 1999
- Campeonato Goiano: 1999, 2000, 2001, 2003
- Copa Centro-Oeste: 2000, 2001, 2002

São Paulo

- Campeonato Brasileiro Série A: 2006
- Campeonato Paulista: 2005
- Copa Libertadores: 2005
- FIFA Club World Cup: 2005

Kashima Antlers

- J. League Division 1: 2007, 2008, 2009
- Emperor's Cup: 2007
- Japanese Super Cup: 2009

Corinthians

- Campeonato Brasileiro Série A: 2011, 2015, 2017
- Campeonato Paulista: 2013, 2018
- Copa Libertadores: 2012
- Recopa Sudamericana: 2013
- FIFA Club World Cup: 2012

=== Manager ===
Corinthians U20

- Copa São Paulo de Futebol Jr.: 2024

Uberlândia

- Campeonato Brasileiro Série D: 2026
