= Bruno Fuso =

Brazilian footballer (born 1988)

Personal information
- Full name: Bruno de Carlo Fuso
- Date of birth: 30 January 1988 (age 38)
- Place of birth: Limeira, São Paulo (state), Brazil
- Height: 1.94 m (6 ft 4 in)
- Position: Goalkeeper

Team information
- Current team: Sousa
- Number: 1

Youth career
- 2003–2008: Atlético Mineiro

Senior career*
Years	Team	Apps	(Gls)
2008–2011	Atlético Mineiro		
2010	→ Oeste (loan)		
2010	→ Náutico (loan)		
2011–2015	Ponte Preta		
2012	→ Coritiba (loan)		
2013	→ XV de Piracicaba (loan)		
2013	→ Coritiba (loan)		
2014	→ ABC (loan)		
2015	→ Villa Nova (loan)		
2016	Novo Hamburgo		
2017	Treze		
2017–2018	Brasiliense		
2019–2021	CRAC		
2021	Penarol-AM		
2022	River-PI		
2023	Goianésia		
2023	Santa Cruz-RN		
2023	CEOV		
2024–	Sousa		
- * Club domestic league appearances and goals as of 09:52, 25 May 2017 (UTC)

Bruno de Carlo Fuso, born on 30 January 1988 in Limeira, São Paulo (state), Brazil, is a Brazilian soccer player who player for Sousa.

He previously played in the Brazilian Serie A for Atlético Mineiro and Coritiba, in Serie B for Naútico and Ponte Preta, in the Campeonato Paulista for Ponte Preta and XV de Piracicaba, in the Campeonato Potiguar for ABC Futebol Clube, in the Campeonato Goiano for Novo Hamburgo and on the Campeonato Paraibano for Treze.

== Career ==
=== Atlético Mineiro ===
Bruno Fuso began his professional career at Atlético Mineiro, where he had been part of the youth team. He made his league debut in August 2009 in a 1–1 draw against Palmeiras. He went on to play 7 league fixtures in the 2009 season, and made two appearances in the 2009 Copa Sudamericana.

==== Loan spells ====
In 2010, he was loaned to Oeste Futebol Clube to play Campeonato Paulista, but only made the substitute bench. For the second half of the year he was loaned to Náutico to play 2010 Campeonato Brasileiro Série B. His debut came as a substitute on 1 June 2010 against São Caetano, a game which ended in a 5–0 defeat. Náutico were already 2–0 when he entered the field, after starting goalkeeper Rodrigo Carvalho was sent off. His first job was to face a penalty taken by Eduardo Pacheco. He went on to make a total of 10 league appearances for the club before the end of the season.

=== Ponte Preta ===
He was signed by Ponte Preta for the 2011 campaign, making his debut against Mirassol in a 2–1 2011 Campeonato Paulista defeat. He made 23 appearances in the Campeonato Paulista season, and one in 2011 Copa do Brasil, but only played once when the club competed in 2011 Campeonato Brasileiro Série B in the second half of the year. In the 2012 season, he remained out of favour until late in the 2012 Campeonato Paulista campaign, making just four appearances. He also played three 2012 Copa do Brasil games. In the last of these, against São Paulo, he made a bizarre error which cost his side a quarter-final place. Despite being contracted until the end of 2015, he was loaned to Coritiba the following month.

==== Loan spells ====
He made just one appearance for Coritiba in 2012 Campeonato Brasileiro Série A, a 3–1 defeat to São Paulo on 8 July 2012; however, he signed a pre-contract to return for 2013 Campeonato Brasileiro Série A. He returned to Ponte Preta, and accepted another loan in January 2013 to XV de Piracicaba for 2013 Campeonato Paulista in order to be closer to his family. He made 11 appearances and returned to Ponte Preta on 23 April, and then rejoined Coritiba on 21 May. He made no further appearances for Coritiba in this loan spell.

In 2014, he was loaned on a full-year contract to ABC Futebol Clube. He played all 20 ties for the club in 2014 Campeonato Potiguar, but did not feature in the 2014 Campeonato Brasileiro Série B and returned to Ponte Preta in early November.

He was loaned to Villa Nova-MG for the 2015 season, but made no appearances.

=== Novo Hamburgo ===
When his Ponte Preta contract ended, he signed with Novo Hamburgo to play 2016 Campeonato Gaúcho. He made 8 appearances, with his debut being against Ypiranga de Erechim, a 3–1 victory.

=== Treze ===
On 7 November 2016, he joined Treze to play 2017 Campeonato Paraibano. His debut came on 7 January 2017 in the first round, with a 1–0 win against Atlético Cajazeirense. He went on to play the first 12 games of the campaign before being dropped to the bench in favour of Diego Martins Machado. Treze went on to be the runner-up in the competition.

== Honours ==
=== Club ===
Sousa

- Campeonato Paraibano: 2024, 2025
