= Élton (footballer, born 1 August 1985) =

Brazilian footballer

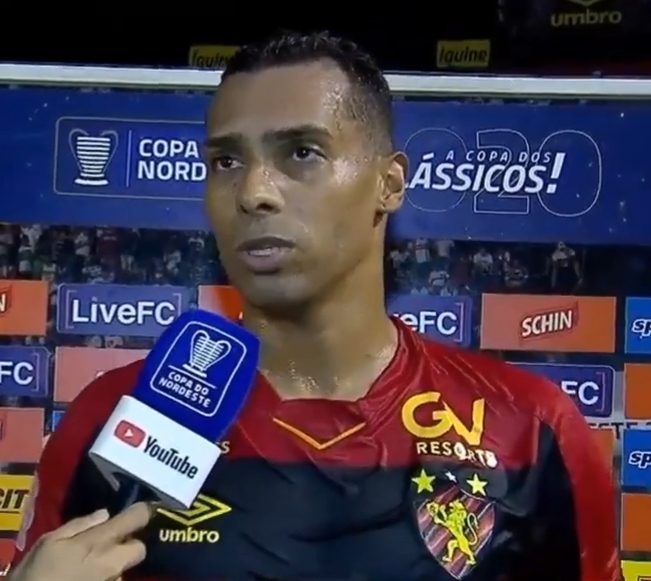
- Élton, 2020

Personal information
- Full name: Élton Rodrigues Brandão
- Date of birth: 1 August 1985 (age 41)
- Place of birth: Iramaia, Brazil
- Height: 1.85 m (6 ft 1 in)
- Position: Striker

Youth career
- –2002: Palmeiras Nordeste
- 2002–2004: Iraty

Senior career*
Years	Team	Apps	(Gls)
2003–2005	Iraty		
2005–2009	São Caetano	11	(0)
2005	→ Coritiba (loan)	6	(0)
2006	→ Santo André (loan)	17	(3)
2006	→ Legia Warsaw (loan)	11	(3)
2007	→ Iraty (loan)	14	(3)
2008	→ Santo André (loan)	55	(19)
2009	→ Vasco da Gama (loan)	42	(23)
2010–2011	Olé Brasil	0	(0)
2010	→ Vasco da Gama (loan)	15	(5)
2010	→ Sporting Braga (loan)	6	(0)
2011	→ Vasco da Gama (loan)	35	(12)
2012–2014	Corinthians	22	(2)
2012	→ Vitória (loan)	20	(10)
2013	→ Náutico (loan)	20	(17)
2013–2014	→ Al-Nassr (loan)	20	(16)
2014–2018	Monte Azul	0	(0)
2014	→ Flamengo (loan)	12	(2)
2015	→ Vitória (loan)	36	(10)
2016	→ JEF United Chiba (loan)	34	(10)
2017	→ Red Bull Brasil (loan)	10	(4)
2017–2018	→ Ceará (loan)	43	(15)
2018	Figueirense	17	(10)
2019–2020	Sport Recife	48	(9)
2020–2022	Cuiabá	63	(19)
2022	CSA	14	(2)
2023	Juventude	3	(0)
2023	Remo	8	(3)
- * Club domestic league appearances and goals

Élton Rodrigues Brandão (born 1 August 1985), simply known as Élton or Pelélton, is a Brazilian former professional footballer who played as a striker.

A journeyman striker, Élton played for several clubs in Brazil, whilst also having spells in Poland, Portugal, Saudi Arabia, and Japan. He was the top scorer during the 2009 season with Vasco da Gama, and top goalscorer during the 2013 season with Náutico.

== Career ==
At the end of the 2009 season with CR Vasco da Gama, was awarded the Campeonato Brasileiro Série B top scorer award with 17, along with Marcelo Nicácio and Rafael Coelho.

On 1 November 2010, Globoesporte held a vote to Vasco da Gama fans to see which player they would miss the most after their loan spell ended. Élton won the vote with 55% of the vote.

On 25 January 2011, Élton returned to Vasco da Gama on a one year loan.

On 13 August 2012, Élton was announced at Vitória on a loan deal. He scored on his league debut for the club, scoring against Joinville on 17 August 2012.

On 21 January 2013, Élton was announced at Náutico on a one year loan. On 4 March 2013, he scored a hattrick against Chã Grande.

On 28 January 2015, Élton agreed to terminate his contract with Flamengo.

On 21 December 2021, after finishing as the team's top goalscorer with 15 goals in all competitions, Élton signed a new one year contract with Cuiabá.

On 19 January 2023, Élton terminated his contract with CSA after taking them to court due to unpaid wages.

On 29 May 2023, Élton agreed to terminate his contract with Juventude.

On 23 June 2023, free agent Élton was announced at Remo.

== Career statistics ==
Appearances and goals by club, season and competition
Club	Season	League			State League		Cup		Continental		Other		Total	
Club	Season	Division	Apps	Goals	Apps	Goals	Apps	Goals	Apps	Goals	Apps	Goals	Apps	Goals
São Caetano	2005	Série A	2	0	—		—		—		—		2	0
São Caetano	2007	Série B	9	0	—		—		—		—		9	0
São Caetano	Total		11	0	—		—		—		—		11	0
Coritiba (loan)	2005	Série A	6	0	—		—		—		—		6	0
Santo André (loan)	2006	Série B	9	2	8	1	1	0	—		—		18	3
Legia Warsaw (loan)	2006–07	Ekstraklasa	11	3	—		1	0	5 (Note: Four appearances and one goal in UEFA Champions League, one appearance in UEFA Cup)	1	1 (Note: Appearance(s) in Polish Super Cup)	0	18	4
Iraty (loan)	2007	Paranaense	—		14	3	—		—		—		14	3
Santo André (loan)	2008	Série B	34	10	21	9	—		—		—		55	19
Vasco da Gama	2009	Série B	30	17	12	6	6	3	—		—		48	26
Vasco da Gama	2010	Série A	8	2	7	3	7	4	—		—		22	9
Vasco da Gama	Total		38	19	19	9	13	7	—		—		70	35
Braga	2010–11	Primeira Liga	6	0	—		1	1	3 (Note: Appearance(s) in UEFA Champions League)	0	0	0	10	1
Vasco da Gama	2011	Série A	28	11	7	1	5	1	5 (Note: Appearance(s) in Copa Sudamericana)	2	—		45	15
Corinthians	2012	Série A	7	0	15	2	—		7 (Note: Appearance(s) in Copa Libertadores)	1	—		29	3
Vitória (loan)	2012	Série B	20	10	—		—		—		—		20	10
Náutico (loan)	2013	Série A	2	0	18	17	2	1	—		—		22	18
Al Nassr (loan)	2013–14	Saudi Professional League	20	16	—		1	0	—		2 (Note: Appearance(s) in Saudi Crown Prince Cup)	2	23	18
Flamengo	2014	Série A	12	2	—		1	0	—		—		13	2
Vitória	2015	Série A	32	10	4	0	3	1	—		5 (Note: Appearance(s) in Copa do Nordeste)	1	44	12
JEF United Chiba	2014	J.League Division 2	34	10	—		0	0	—		—		34	10
Red Bull Brasil	2017	Série D	0	0	10	4	—		—		—		10	4
Ceará	2017	Série B	28	9	—		—		—		—		28	9
Ceará	2018	Série A	6	2	9	4	3	0	—		8	1	26	7
Ceará	Total		34	11	9	4	3	0	—		8	1	54	16
Figueirense	2018	Série A	17	10	—		—		—		—		17	10
Sport Recife	2019	Série B	24	2	8	2	1	0	—		—		33	4
Sport Recife	2020	Série A	9	2	7	3	1	0	—		6	2	23	7
Sport Recife	Total		33	4	15	5	1	0	—		6	2	55	11
Cuiabá	2020	Série B	24	9	—		—		—		3 (Note: Appearance(s) in Copa Verde)	2	27	11
Cuiabá	2021	Série A	31	9	9	6	2	0	—		0	0	42	15
Cuiabá	2022	Série A	8	1	0	0	4	3	4	2	0	0	16	6
Cuiabá	Total		63	19	9	6	2	0	—		3	2	93	34
CSA	2022	Série B	14	2	—		—		—		—		14	2
Juventude	2023	Série B	3	0	—		—		—		—		3	0
Remo	2023	Série C	8	3	—		—		—		—		8	3
Career total			442	142	149	61	38	14	24	6	25	8	679	231

== Honours ==
Santo André

- Campeonato Paulista Série A2: 2008

Vasco

- Campeonato Brasileiro Série B: 2009
- Copa do Brasil: 2011

Corinthians

- Copa Libertadores: 2012

Al-Nassr

- Saudi Crown Prince Cup: 2013–14
- Saudi Professional League: 2013–14

Cuiabá

- Campeonato Mato-Grossense: 2021, 2022
