= Jorge Henrique (footballer, born October 1982) =

Brazilian footballer

Personal information
- Full name: Jorge Henrique de Almeida Leão
- Date of birth: October 29, 1982 (age 44)
- Place of birth: Campo Grande, Brazil
- Height: 1.73 m (5 ft 8 in)
- Position: Left winger

Senior career*
Years	Team	Apps	(Gls)
2009	Atlético Goianiense	36	(16)
2009–2010	Ceará	41	(13)
2010	→ Vila Nova (loan)	29	(27)
2011	Vila Nova	32	(12)
- * Club domestic league appearances and goals as of September 11, 2010 ‡ National team caps and goals as of September 11, 2010

Jorge Henrique de Almeida Leão (29 October 1982), better known as Jorge Henrique, is a Brazilian footballer who plays as left-winger.

== Contract ==
- Ceará.

== See also ==
- Football in Brazil
- List of football clubs in Brazil
