= Taubaté (footballer) =

Brazilian footballer

Personal information
- Full name: Paulo Sérgio Rodrigues Theodoro
- Date of birth: September 15, 1991 (age 35)
- Place of birth: Taubaté, Brazil
- Height: 1.89 m (6 ft 2 1/2 in)
- Position: Forward

Team information
- Current team: Comercial

Youth career
- –2010: Corinthians Paulista

Senior career*
Years	Team	Apps	(Gls)
2010–2011	Corinthians B	0	(0)
2010	→ Nacional (loan)		
2011–	Corinthians	5	(0)
2012	→ Botafogo-SP (loan)		
2012–	→ Comercial (loan)		
- * Club domestic league appearances and goals as of October 16, 2010 ‡ National team caps and goals as of October 16, 2010

Paulo Sérgio Rodrigues Theodoro (born September 15, 1991), better known as Taubaté, is a Brazilian footballer playing for the Comercial Futebol Clube.

== Career ==
Taubaté began his career in the youth of Corinthians. In the junior team of Corinthians in 2010, was named by coach Mano Menezes to integrate the core team of Corinthians. He made his first-team debut for Corinthians on 5 September 2011 in a league match against Coritiba as a last 5 minutes substitute for Jorge Henrique.

=== Career statistics ===
(Correct as of August 28, 2012)

Club	Season	State League		Brazilian Série A		Copa do Brasil		Copa Libertadores		Copa Sudamericana		Total	
Club	Season	Apps	Goals	Apps	Goals	Apps	Goals	Apps	Goals	Apps	Goals	Apps	Goals
Corinthians	2011	0	0	1	0	0	0	0	0	0	0	1	0
Botafogo-SP	2012	5	0	0	0	0	0	0	0	0	0	5	0
Total		5	0	1	0	0	0	0	0	0	0	6	0

== Honours ==
Corinthians Paulista

- Campeonato Paulista Infantil: 2006

== Contract ==
- Contract with Corinthians until June 12, 2013.
