= Paulo André =

Brazilian footballer

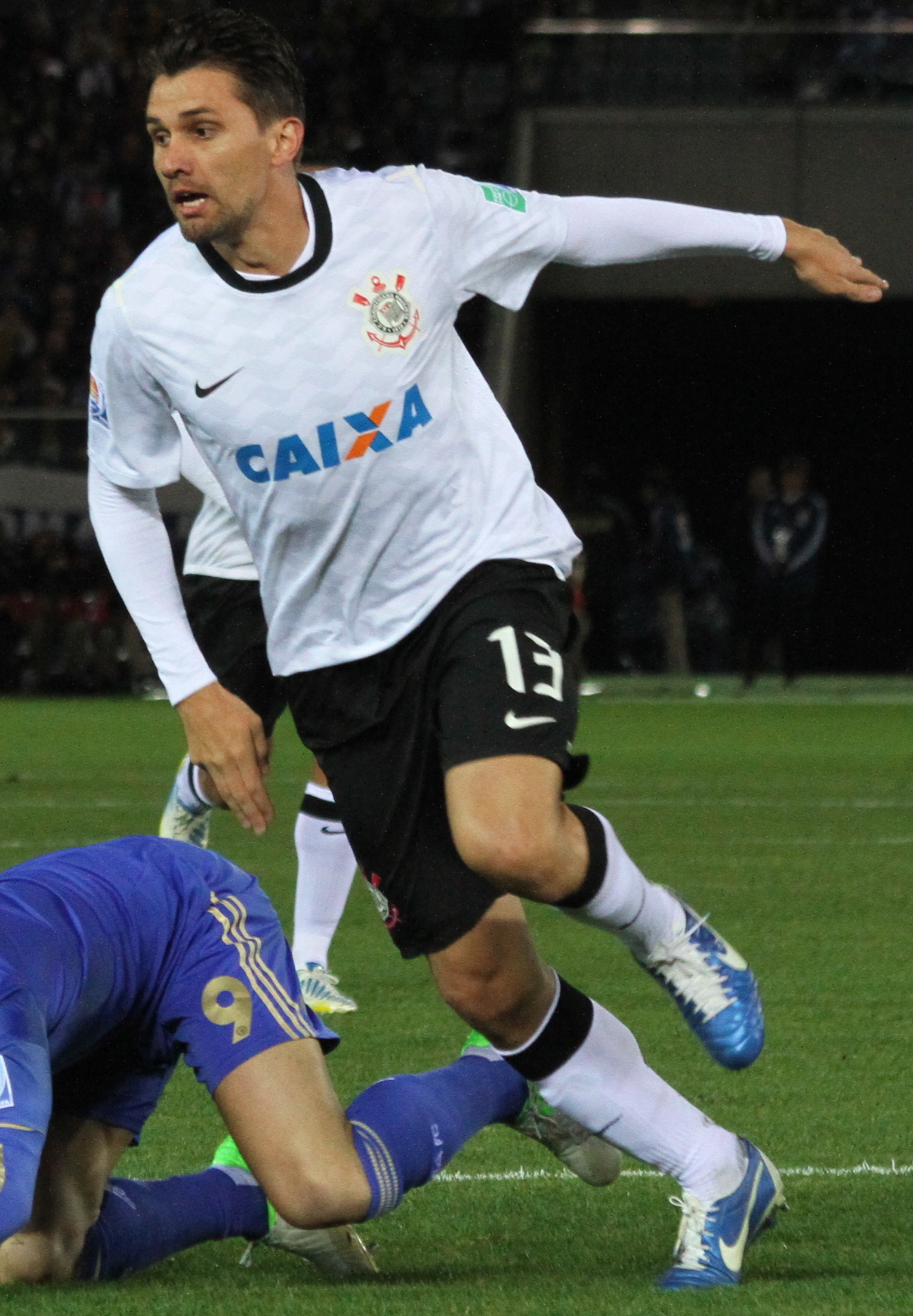
- André with Corinthians at the 2012 FIFA Club World Cup Final

Personal information
- Full name: Paulo André Cren Benini
- Date of birth: 20 August 1983 (age 43)
- Place of birth: Campinas, Brazil
- Height: 1.86 m (6 ft 1 in)
- Position: Centre back

Youth career
- 1999–2001: São Paulo
- 2001–2002: CSA
- 2002: Águas de Lindóia
- 2003: Guarani

Senior career*
Years	Team	Apps	(Gls)
2004–2005	Guarani	22	(2)
2005–2006	Athletico Paranaense	37	(2)
2006–2010	Le Mans	36	(2)
2009–2010	→ Corinthians (loan)	12	(0)
2010–2014	Corinthians	88	(5)
2014	Shanghai Shenhua	23	(0)
2015–2016	Cruzeiro	17	(0)
2016	→ Athletico Paranaense (loan)	26	(2)
2017–2019	Athletico Paranaense	32	(1)
Total		293	(14)
- * Club domestic league appearances and goals

Paulo André Cren Benini (born 20 August 1983) is a Brazilian former professional footballer who played as a central defender.

He is currently married to the former Brazilian professional tennis player, two time WTA tournaments champion and former world 43,Teliana Pereira, with whom he has a son named Matteo.

== Career ==
Paulo André Cren Benini began his football career playing for the São Paulo youth team, however he was unable to impress the coaching staff and was dismissed by the club. He would go to the youth teams of CSA, Águas de Lindóia as well as having a trial with Scottish club Rangers F.C. in 2002, under manager Alex McLeish before he joined Série A club Guarani who promoted him to their senior side. While Paulo André would go on to establish himself within the club he was unfortunately part of the squad that was relegated at the end of the 2004 league campaign. Despite this disappointment Paulo André had impressed Atlético Paranaense who gave him another chance at the top tier when they signed him before the start of the 2005 league campaign.

In his debut season for Atlético Paranaense Paulo André would soon establish himself a vital member of the team's defense and helped guide the club to qualify for the 2006 Copa Sudamericana. After having a personally successful debut season he would spark foreign interests and French Ligue 1 club Le Mans signed Paulo André in June 2006 on a four and half years deal. This would see Paulo André make his league debut for Le Mans on 19 August 2006 against Valenciennes FC in a 3–2 victory, however after only three further games Paulo André was struck with a patellar tendon injury in his right knee. The injury would require three surgeries and Paulo André missing the whole of the 2007–08 Ligue 1 campaign. On his return within the 2008–09 Ligue 1 campaign he was able to play in 31 games throughout the season until on 4 August 2009 Brazilian club Sport Club Corinthians Paulista signed Paulo André from Le Mans on a single season loan.

The following season Corinthians would make Paulo André a permanent member of the squad and while he was initially used as a squad player by the 2011 league campaign he would start to establish himself within the starting eleven and went on to win the Campeonato Brasileiro Série A championship with the club. This would then be followed by the club winning the 2012 Copa Libertadores and 2012 FIFA Club World Cup.

On 12 February 2014, Corinthians officially confirmed Paulo André's departure to Chinese Super League side Shanghai Greenland Shenhua.

On 10 February 2015, after a year playing in China, Paulo André joined Cruzeiro.

== Career statistics ==
Appearances and goals by club, season and competition
Club	Season	League			State League		Cup		Continental		Other		Total	
Club	Season	Division	Apps	Goals	Apps	Goals	Apps	Goals	Apps	Goals	Apps	Goals	Apps	Goals
Guarani	2004	Série A	13	0	5	2	6	0	—		—		24	2
Guarani	2005	Série B	9	2	18	1	4	1	—		—		31	4
Guarani	Total		22	2	23	3	10	1	—		—		55	6
Atlético Paranaense	2005	Série A	28	2	—		—		—		—		28	2
Atlético Paranaense	2006	Série A	9	0	16	5	2	1	0	0	—		27	6
Atlético Paranaense	Total		37	2	16	5	2	1	0	0	—		55	8
Le Mans	2006–07	Ligue 1	5	1	—		—		—		1 (Note: Appearance(s) in Coupe de la Ligue)	0	6	1
Le Mans	2007–08	Ligue 1	0	0	—		—		—		—		0	0
Le Mans	2008–09	Ligue 1	31	1	—		1	0	—		1	1	33	2
Le Mans	Total		36	2	—		1	0	—		2	1	39	3
Corinthians	2009	Série A	12	0	—		—		—		—		12	0
Corinthians	2010	Série A	15	2	9	1	—		1 (Note: Appearance(s) in Copa Libertadores)	0	—		25	3
Corinthians	2011	Série A	16	0	1	1	—		0	0	—		17	1
Corinthians	2012	Série A	29	2	1	0	—		0	0	2 (Note: Appearance(s) in FIFA Club World Cup)	0	32	2
Corinthians	2013	Série A	28	1	15	1	3	0	8	0	2 (Note: Appearance(s) in Recopa Sudamericana)	0	56	2
Corinthians	2014	Série A	0	0	6	0	0	0	0	0	—		6	0
Corinthians	Total		100	5	32	3	3	0	9	0	4	0	148	8
Shanghai Shenhua	2014	Chinese Super League	23	0	—		0	0	—		—		23	0
Cruzeiro	2015	Série A	17	0	7	0	2	0	5	0	—		31	0
Athletico Paranaense	2016	Série A	26	2	14	0	4	0	—		5 (Note: Appearance(s) in Primeira Liga)	0	49	2
Athletico Paranaense	2017	Série A	21	0	6	0	1	0	12	0	—		40	0
Athletico Paranaense	2018	Série A	11	1	0	0	6	1	6 (Note: Appearance(s) in Copa Sudamericana)	0	—		23	2
Athletico Paranaense	2019	Série A	0	0	2	0	0	0	0	0	—		2	0
Athletico Paranaense	Total		58	3	22	0	11	1	18	0	5	0	114	4
Career total			293	14	100	11	29	3	32	0	11	1	465	29

== Honours ==
Corinthians

- Campeonato Brasileiro Série A: 2011
- Copa Libertadores: 2012
- FIFA Club World Cup: 2012
- Campeonato Paulista: 2013
- Recopa Sudamericana: 2013

Athletico Paranaense

- Campeonato Paranaense: 2016, 2019
- Copa Sudamericana: 2018

Individual

- Bola de Prata: 2011
