= Guilherme Andrade =

Brazilian footballer (born 1989)

Personal information
- Full name: Guilherme Andrade da Silva
- Date of birth: 31 January 1989 (age 37)
- Place of birth: Montes Claros, Brazil
- Height: 1.80 m (5 ft 11 in)
- Position: Right back

Team information
- Current team: Barretos

Youth career
- Brasilis
- 2008: Ponte Preta
- 2009: São Paulo

Senior career*
Years	Team	Apps	(Gls)
2009–2012	Ponte Preta	144	(11)
2012–2016	Corinthians	20	(0)
2015	→ Ceará (loan)	10	(0)
2016	→ Bragantino (loan)	9	(0)
2017	Atlético Tubarão	5	(0)
2018	Água Santa	4	(0)
2020–	Barretos	5	(0)
- * Club domestic league appearances and goals

Guilherme Andrade da Silva, commonly known as Guilherme Andrade, (born 31 January 1989) is a Brazilian footballer who plays as a right back for Barretos.

== Honours ==
Corinthians

- FIFA Club World Cup: 2012
- Campeonato Paulista: 2013
- Recopa Sudamericana: 2013

== Statistics ==
Club performance
Club	Season	Brasileirão Série A		Brasileirão Série B		Copa do Brasil		Libertadores		Copa Sudamericana		Campeonato Paulista		Friendly		Total
Club	Season	App	Goals	App	Goals	App	Goals	App	Goals	App	Goals	App	Goals	App	Goals	App	Goals
Ponte Preta	2009	0	0	23	0	0	0	0	0	0	0	7	2	0	0	30	0
	2010	0	0	26	1	4	0	0	0	0	0	17	2	0	0	47	4
	2011	0	0	30	3	1	0	0	0	0	0	13	1	0	0	44	4
	2012	0	0	0	0	5	0	0	0	0	0	18	3	0	0	23	3
Total		0	0	79	4	10	0	0	0	0	0	55	8	0	0	144	11
Corinthians	2012	8	0	0	0	0	0	0	0	0	0	0	0	0	0	8	0
	2013	0	0	0	0	0	0	0	0	0	0	4	0	0	0	4	0
	2014	6	0	0	0	2	0	0	0	0	0	0	0	1	0	9	0
Total		14	0	0	0	2	0	0	0	0	0	4	0	1	0	21	0
Total		14	0	79	4	12	0	0	0	0	0	59	8	1	0	165	11

FIFA Club World Cup

Season	Club	League	Apps	Goals
2012	Corinthians	FIFA Club World Cup	1	0
Total	-	-	1	0
