= Alessandro (footballer, born 1979) =

Brazilian footballer

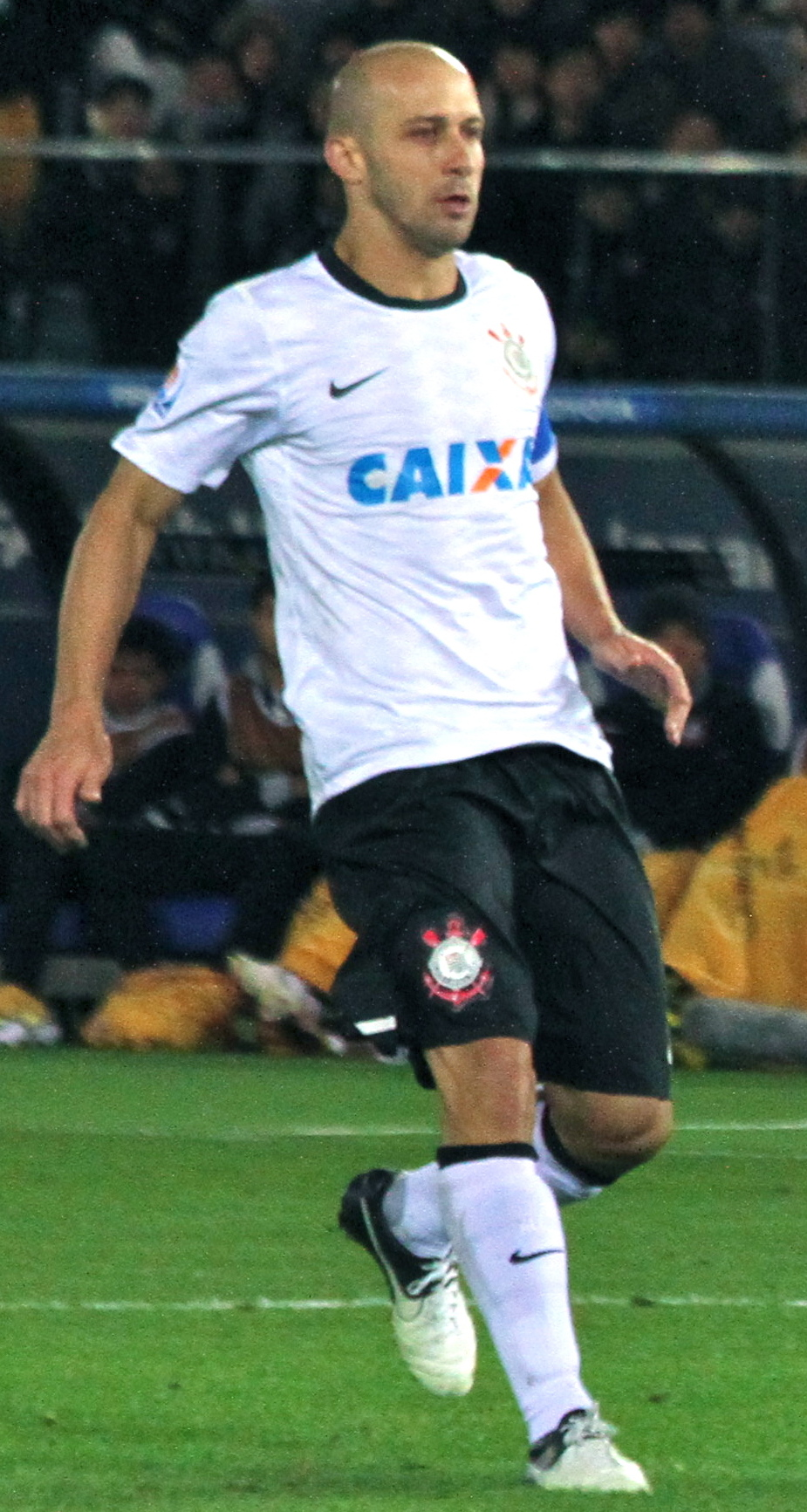
- Alessandro with Corinthians at the 2012 FIFA Club World Cup

Personal information
- Full name: Alessandro Mori Nunes
- Date of birth: 10 January 1979 (age 47)
- Place of birth: Assis Chateaubriand, Brazil
- Height: 1.77 m (5 ft 10 in)
- Position: Right back

Youth career
- 1996–1997: Flamengo

Senior career*
Years	Team	Apps	(Gls)
1997–2002	Flamengo	55	(2)
2003	Palmeiras	0	(0)
2003	Flamengo	1	(0)
2003–2007	Dynamo Kyiv	4	(1)
2003–2004	→ Dynamo-2 Kyiv	17	(2)
2004	→ Cruzeiro (loan)	6	(0)
2005–2007	→ Grêmio (loan)	6	(0)
2007	Santos	22	(0)
2008–2013	Corinthians	116	(0)
Total		227	(5)
- * Club domestic league appearances and goals

Alessandro Mori Nunes or simply Alessandro (born 10 January 1979) is a Brazilian former professional footballer.

== Honours ==
Flamengo

- Campeonato Carioca: 1999, 2000, 2001
- Copa do Brasil: 2001

Dynamo Kyiv

- Ukrainian Premier League: 2004
- Ukrainian Cup: 2005

Grêmio

- Campeonato Brasileiro Série B: 2005
- Campeonato Gaúcho: 2006

Santos

- Campeonato Paulista: 2007

Corinthians

- Campeonato Brasileiro Série B: 2008
- Campeonato Paulista: 2009, 2013
- Copa do Brasil: 2009
- Campeonato Brasileiro Série A: 2011
- Copa Libertadores: 2012
- FIFA Club World Cup: 2012
- Recopa Sudamericana: 2013

== Statistics ==
Club performance
Club	Season	Brasileirão Série A		Brasileirão Série B		Copa do Brasil		Libertadores		Copa Sudamericana		State League		Friendly		Total
Club	Season	App	Goals	App	Goals	App	Goals	App	Goals	App	Goals	App	Goals	App	Goals	App	Goals
Flamengo	1997	2	0	0	0	0	0	0	0	0	0	0	0	0	0	2	0
	1998	3	0	0	0	0	0	0	0	0	0	0	0	0	0	8^{1}	3^{1}
	2000	12	0	0	0	0	0	0	0	1	0	0	0	2	0	21^{2}	1^{3}
	2001	24	1	0	0	5	1	0	0	8	0	16	0	1	0	60^{3}	3^{3}
	2002	14	1	0	0	0	0	0	0	0	0	17	0	0	0	41^{4}	2^{4}
	2003	1	0	0	0	2	0	0	0	0	0	11	1	1	0	14	1
Cruzeiro	2004	6	0	0	0	0	0	0	0	0	0	0	0	0	0	6	0
Grêmio	2006	6	0	0	0	0	0	0	0	0	0	0	0	0	0	6	0
Santos	2007	22	0	0	0	0	0	0	0	0	0	0	0	0	0	22	0
Corinthians	2008	0	0	25	2	4	0	0	0	0	0	10	0	1	0	40	2
	2009	17	0	0	0	8	0	0	0	0	0	15	0	1	0	41	0
	2010	31	0	0	0	0	0	2	0	0	0	11	0	3	0	47	0
	2011	22	0	0	0	0	0	2	0	0	0	14	1	0	0	38	1
	2012	26	0	0	0	0	0	9	0	0	0	9	1	2	0	46	1
	2013	21	0	0	0	3	0	8	0	0	0	13	0	0	0	45	0
Total		207	2	25	2	22	1	22	0	9	0	116	3	11	0	430	14

- ^{1} Included 5 games and 3 goal in Copa Rio 1998.
- ^{2} Included 2 games in Torneio Rio–São Paulo 2000.
- ^{3} Included 1 games and 1 goal in Torneio Rio–São Paulo and 5 games in Copa dos Campeões 2001.
- ^{4} Included 5 games and 1 goal in Torneio Rio–São Paulo and 5 games in Copa dos Campeões 2002.

FIFA Club World Cup

Season	Club	League	Apps	Goals
2012	Corinthians	FIFA Club World Cup	2	0
Total	–	–	2	0
