= Ralf (footballer) =

Brazilian footballer

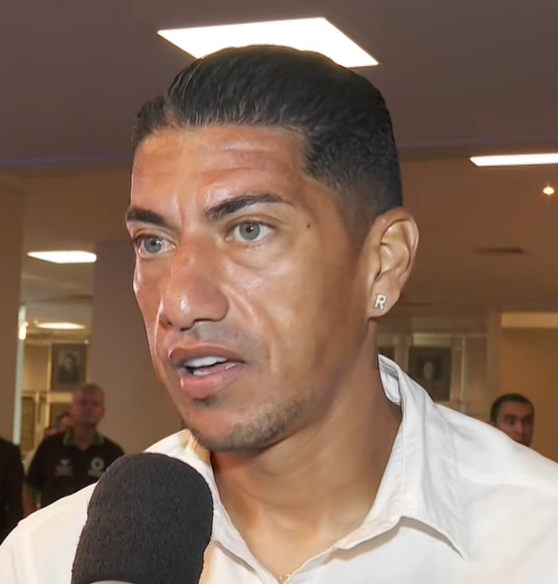
- Ralf in 2023

Personal information
- Full name: Ralf de Souza Teles
- Date of birth: June 9, 1984 (age 42)
- Place of birth: São Paulo, Brazil
- Height: 1.82 m (6 ft 0 in)
- Position: Defensive midfielder

Team information
- Current team: Guarani
- Number: 14

Youth career
- 2002: Taboão da Serra
- 2003: São Paulo

Senior career*
Years	Team	Apps	(Gls)
2004–2006	Imperatriz	49	(8)
2007	XV de Jaú	21	(2)
2007	Gama	36	(0)
2008	Noroeste	18	(1)
2008–2009	Grêmio Barueri	35	(1)
2010–2015	Corinthians	187	(6)
2016–2017	Beijing Guoan	57	(1)
2018–2019	Corinthians	19	(1)
2020–2021	Avaí	35	(0)
2022	Cianorte	13	(0)
2022–2025	Vila Nova	139	(0)
2025-	Guarani	3	(0)

International career
2011–2013	Brazil	8	(0)
- * Club domestic league appearances and goals as of 11 May 2026

Ralf de Souza Teles (born June 9, 1984), known simply as Ralf, is a Brazilian professional footballer who plays as a defensive midfielder for Guarani.

== Club career ==
Ralf led Barueri to its first ever season in the Campeonato Paulista and Brazilian Série A. His consistent and quality play with Barueri led Corithians to make him one of several midfielders signed by the club in the 2010 pre-season. On July 13, 2012, he renewed his contract with Corinthians for another three years, despite transfer offers coming from European clubs.

== Career statistics ==
As of match played 11 May 2026

Appearances and goals by club, season and competition
Club	Season	League			State League		National cup		Continental		Other		Total	
Club	Season	Division	Apps	Goals	Apps	Goals	Apps	Goals	Apps	Goals	Apps	Goals	Apps	Goals
Imperatriz	2006	Série C	—		—		2	1	—		—		2	1
XV de Jaú	2007	Paulista A2	—		18	1	—		—		—		18	1
Gama	2007	Série B	36	0	—		—		—		—		36	0
Noroeste	2008	Série C	12	0	17	0	—		—		—		29	0
Barueri	2008	Série B	11	0	—		—		—		—		11	0
Barueri	2009	Série A	35	1	21	0	—		—		—		56	1
Barueri	Total		46	1	21	0	—		—		—		67	1
Corinthians	2010	Série A	28	2	13	0	—		8	0	—		49	2
Corinthians	2011	Série A	33	1	22	0	—		2	0	—		57	1
Corinthians	2012	Série A	29	1	15	0	—		14	1	2 (Note: Appearances in FIFA Club World Cup)	0	60	2
Corinthians	2013	Série A	36	1	17	0	4	0	8	0	2 (Note: Appearances in Recopa Sudamericana)	0	67	1
Corinthians	2014	Série A	30	0	15	0	6	1	—		—		51	1
Corinthians	2015	Série A	31	1	14	0	1	0	10	0	—		56	1
Corinthians	Total		187	6	96	0	11	1	42	1	4	0	340	8
Beijing Guoan	2016	Chinese Super League	30	1	—		4	0	—		—		34	1
Beijing Guoan	2017	Chinese Super League	27	0	—		2	0	—		—		29	0
Beijing Guoan	Total		57	1	—		6	0	—		—		63	1
Corinthians	2018	Série A	19	1	4	0	6	0	2	0	—		31	1
Corinthians	2019	Série A	23	1	13	0	8	0	5 (Note: Appearances in Copa Sudamericana)	0	—		49	1
Corinthians	Total		42	2	17	0	14	0	7	0	—		80	2
Avaí	2020	Série B	33	0	2	0	—		—		—		35	0
Cianorte	2022	Paranaense	—		13	0	—		—		—		13	0
Vila Nova	2022	Série B	27	0	—		3	0	—		5 (Note: Appearances in Copa Verde)	0	35	0
Vila Nova	2023	Série B	31	0	13	0	2	0	—		3 (Note: Appearances in Copa Verde)	0	49	0
Vila Nova	2024	Série B	28	0	16	0	—		—		5 (Note: Appearances in Copa Verde)	0	49	0
Vila Nova	2025	Série B	16	0	8	0	2	0	—		1 (Note: Appearances in Copa Verde)	0	27	0
Vila Nova	Total		102	0	37	0	6	0	—		14	0	159	0
Guarani	2026	Série C	—		3	0	—		—		—		3	0
Career total			515	10	224	1	40	2	49	1	18	0	846	14

== Honours ==
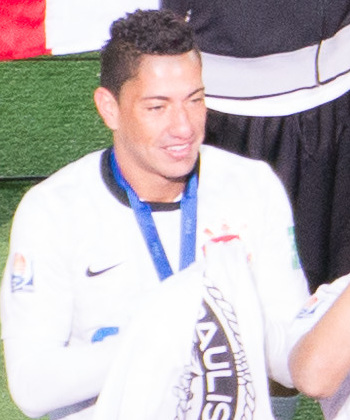
Ralf celebrating the 2012 FIFA Club World Cup with Corinthians

Imperatriz

- Campeonato Maranhense: 2005

Corinthians

- Campeonato Brasileiro Série A: 2011, 2015
- Copa Libertadores da América: 2012
- FIFA Club World Cup: 2012
- Recopa Sudamericana: 2013
- Campeonato Paulista: 2013, 2018, 2019

Vila Nova

- Campeonato Goiano: 2025

Individual

- Campeonato Brasileiro Série A Team of the Year: 2011
