= Jorge Henrique (footballer, born April 1982) =

Brazilian footballer

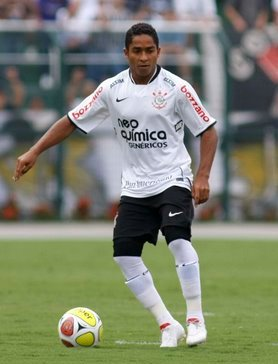
- Henrique with Corinthians in 2010

Personal information
- Full name: Jorge Henrique de Souza
- Date of birth: April 23, 1982 (age 44)
- Place of birth: Resende, Rio de Janeiro, Brazil
- Height: 1.69 m (5 ft 7 in)
- Position: Midfielder

Youth career
- 2001–2002: Figueirense

Senior career*
Years	Team	Apps	(Gls)
2003–2004	Náutico	25	(11)
2005–2006	Atlético Paranaense	4	(0)
2005	→ Santo André (loan)	4	(0)
2006	→ Ceará (loan)	0	(0)
2006	→ Santa Cruz (loan)	16	(2)
2007–2008	Botafogo	53	(14)
2009–2013	Corinthians	102	(11)
2013–2015	Internacional	45	(4)
2015–2016	Vasco da Gama	42	(1)
2017–2018	Figueirense	41	(6)
2019–2020	Náutico	62	(4)
2021–2022	Brasiliense	1	(0)
2022	Camboriú	15	(0)
2022	North	11	(4)
2023	Democrata-SL	9	(0)
2023	North	6	(1)
2024	Piauí	7	(0)
- * Club domestic league appearances and goals as of 16 October 2024

Jorge Henrique de Souza (born 23 April 1982), or simply Jorge Henrique, is a former Brazilian footballer who played as a midfielder.

== Career ==
Beginning his career with Nautico in 2002, Henrique played for Atletico-PR, Esporte Clube Santo Andre, Ceara SC, Santa Cruz Futbol Clube, Botafogo, Corinthians, Internacional, CR Vasco De Gama, Figueirense FC, Brasiliense FC, Camboriu Futebol Clube, Democrata Futebol Clube and North Esporte Clube.

== Career statistics ==
Club	Season	Brasileirão Série A		Copa do Brasil		Libertadores		Copa Sudamericana		State League		Friendly		Total	
Club	Season	App	Goals	App	Goals	App	Goals	App	Goals	App	Goals	App	Goals	App	Goals
Atlético Paranaense	2005	4	0	0	0	0	0	0	0	0	0	0	0	4	0
Santa Cruz	2006	16	2	0	0	0	0	0	0	0	0	0	0	16	2
Botafogo	2007	24	2	0	0	0	0	4	0	0	0	0	0	27	2
Botafogo	2008	29	6	0	0	0	0	0	0	0	0	0	0	29	6
Corinthians	2009	29	2	0	0	0	0	0	0	17	3	0	0	46	5
Corinthians	2010	25	6	0	0	8	0	0	0	13	3	0	0	46	9
Corinthians	2011	31	3	0	0	2	0	0	0	15	1	0	0	49	4
Corinthians	2012	17	0	0	0	13	3	0	0	8	0	2	0	39	3
Corinthians	2013	0	0	0	0	5	0	0	0	15	3	0	0	19	3
Total		175	21	0	0	28	3	4	0	67	9	2	0	275	34

FIFA Club World Cup

Season	Club	League	Apps	Goals
2012	Corinthians	FIFA Club World Cup	2	0
Total	-	-	2	0

== Honours ==
Náutico

- Pernambuco State League: 2004

Atlético Paranaense

- Paraná State League: 2005

Botafogo

- Taça Rio: 2007, 2008

Corinthians

- São Paulo State League: 2009, 2013
- Copa do Brasil: 2009
- Campeonato Brasileiro Série A: 2011
- Copa Libertadores: 2012
- FIFA Club World Cup: 2012

Internacional

- Rio Grande do Sul State League: 2014, 2015

Vasco da Gama

- Rio De Janeiro State League: 2016

North

- Campeonato Mineiro Segunda Divisão: 2022

Piauí

- Campeonato Piauiense Second Division: 2024
