= 2013 Campeonato Paulista =

Campeonato Paulista - Série A1
- Season: 2013
- Champions: Corinthians (27th title)
- Relegated: Mirassol; União Barbarense; São Caetano; Guarani
- Série D: Botafogo-SP; Penapolense
- Matches: 202
- Goals: 558 (2.76 per match)
- Top goalscorer: Willam (13 goals)
- Biggest home win: Mogi Mirim 6–0 Botafogo
- Biggest away win: União Barbarense 0–4 Santos; Ponte Preta 0–4 Corinthians; Oeste 0–4 São Bernardo
- Highest scoring: Mirassol 6–2 Palmeiras

The 2013 Campeonato Paulista de Futebol Profissional da Primeira Divisão - Série A1 (officially the Paulistão Chevrolet 2013 for sponsorship reasons ) was the 112th season of São Paulo's top professional football league.

It was won for the 27th time by Corinthians, after beating Santos at the finals, the defending champions from the previous three seasons.

== Format ==
The top eight teams in the First Stage qualifies to the Quarter-Finals. The bottom four teams will be relegated to the Série A2. Quarter and Semi-Finals will be played in one-legged matches. The best-four teams not qualified to the Semi-Finals not from the city of São Paulo or Santos FC, will compete in the Campeonato do Interior.

== Teams ==
| Club | Home city | 2012 result |
|---|---|---|
| Atlético Sorocaba | Sorocaba | 3rd (Série A2) |
| Botafogo (SP) | Ribeirão Preto | 15th |
| Bragantino | Bragança Paulista | 8th |
| Corinthians | São Paulo (Tatuapé) | 5th |
| Guarani | Campinas | 2nd |
| Ituano | Itu | 14th |
| Linense | Lins | 11th |
| Mirassol | Mirassol | 9th |
| Mogi Mirim | Mogi Mirim | 7th |
| Oeste | Itápolis | 10th |
| Palmeiras | São Paulo (Perdizes) | 6th |
| Paulista | Jundiaí | 13th |
| Penapolense | Penápolis | 4th (Série A2) |
| Ponte Preta | Campinas | 4th |
| Santos | Santos | 1st |
| São Bernardo | São Bernardo do Campo | 1st (Série A2) |
| São Caetano | São Caetano do Sul | 12th |
| São Paulo | São Paulo (Morumbi) | 3rd |
| União Barbarense | Santa Bárbara d'Oeste | 2nd (Série A2) |
| XV de Piracicaba | Piracicaba | 16th |

Source: Futebol Paulista

== First stage ==
=== League table ===
| Pos | Team | Pld | W | D | L | GF | GA | GD | Pts | Qualification or relegation |
|---|---|---|---|---|---|---|---|---|---|---|
| 1 | São Paulo | 19 | 13 | 2 | 4 | 34 | 18 | +16 | 41 | Advanced to the Quarter-finals |
| 2 | Mogi Mirim | 19 | 12 | 3 | 4 | 36 | 19 | +17 | 39 | Advanced to the Quarter-finals |
| 3 | Santos | 19 | 11 | 6 | 2 | 35 | 21 | +14 | 39 | Advanced to the Quarter-finals |
| 4 | Ponte Preta | 19 | 10 | 8 | 1 | 27 | 13 | +14 | 38 | Advanced to the Quarter-finals |
| 5 | Corinthians | 19 | 9 | 8 | 2 | 31 | 16 | +15 | 35 | Advanced to the Quarter-finals |
| 6 | Palmeiras | 19 | 9 | 7 | 3 | 34 | 24 | +10 | 34 | Advanced to the Quarter-finals |
| 7 | Botafogo-SP | 19 | 9 | 4 | 6 | 26 | 23 | +3 | 31 | Advanced to the Quarter-finals |
| 8 | Penapolense | 19 | 8 | 4 | 7 | 26 | 22 | +4 | 28 | Advanced to the Quarter-finals |
| 9 | Linense | 19 | 7 | 6 | 6 | 27 | 29 | −2 | 27 | |
| 10 | XV de Piracicaba | 19 | 6 | 7 | 6 | 31 | 30 | +1 | 25 | |
| 11 | Bragantino | 19 | 6 | 7 | 6 | 25 | 28 | −3 | 25 | |
| 12 | São Bernardo | 19 | 5 | 5 | 9 | 24 | 30 | −6 | 20 | |
| 13 | Paulista | 19 | 5 | 5 | 9 | 19 | 25 | −6 | 20 | |
| 14 | Ituano | 19 | 5 | 5 | 9 | 20 | 29 | −9 | 20 | |
| 15 | Atlético Sorocaba | 19 | 5 | 4 | 10 | 26 | 30 | −4 | 19 | |
| 16 | Oeste | 19 | 5 | 4 | 10 | 21 | 32 | −11 | 19 | |
| 17 | Mirassol (R) | 19 | 5 | 3 | 11 | 31 | 33 | −2 | 18 | Relegated to the 2014 Série A2 |
| 18 | União Barbarense (R) | 19 | 3 | 7 | 9 | 14 | 28 | −14 | 16 | Relegated to the 2014 Série A2 |
| 19 | São Caetano (R) | 19 | 2 | 7 | 10 | 19 | 35 | −16 | 13 | Relegated to the 2014 Série A2 |
| 20 | Guarani (R) | 19 | 2 | 4 | 13 | 20 | 41 | −21 | 10 | Relegated to the 2014 Série A2 |

Updated to match(es) played on unknown. Source:
Rules for classification: 1st points; 2nd games won; 3rd number of goals scored; 4th results between the teams; 5th less red cards; 6th less yellow cards; 7th raffle.
(R) Relegated

=== Results ===
| Home \ Away | ASR | BRP | BRG | COR | GUA | ITU | LIN | MIR | MOG | OES | PAL | PTA | PEN | PON | SAN | SBD | SCA | SPA | UNB | PIR |
|---|---|---|---|---|---|---|---|---|---|---|---|---|---|---|---|---|---|---|---|---|
| Atlético Sorocaba | | 2–2 | | | | | 2–3 | 3–2 | 1–3 | 1–0 | | | | | 1–2 | | 1–2 | | 4–0 | 0–1 |
| Botafogo=SP | | | 1–0 | 0–0 | 3–1 | | 3–0 | | 2–0 | 2–0 | | | 1–0 | | | 2–0 | | 1–3 | | |
| Bragantino | 1–2 | | | 2–2 | | 1–0 | 2–2 | 1–2 | | | | 2–1 | 3–2 | 0–0 | 2–2 | 3–2 | | | | |
| Corinthians | 2–0 | | | | | 3–2 | | | 2–1 | 5–0 | 2–2 | | 1–1 | 0–1 | | 2–0 | 2–2 | | 3–0 | |
| Guarani | 0–3 | | 1–3 | 0–1 | | | | | 0–2 | | | 1–2 | | 1–3 | | 0–0 | 3–1 | 1–2 | 1–3 | |
| Ituano | 0–0 | 1–2 | | | 2–2 | | | | | 1–2 | 2–1 | | | 3–3 | 0–1 | | | | 0–0 | 2–1 |
| Linense | | | | 2–1 | 2–1 | 0–0 | | | | 3–1 | | 3–0 | 1–1 | 0–0 | 2–2 | | | | 2–3 | |
| Mirassol | | 4–3 | | 0–1 | 1–1 | 0–1 | 3–0 | | | | 6–2 | | 0–1 | | | 3–4 | 3–0 | | 1–2 | |
| Mogi Mirim | | | 4–1 | | | 0–1 | 2–3 | 3–1 | | 1–0 | 2–2 | 2–0 | 3–0 | | | | | 1–0 | | 4–2 |
| Oeste | | | 2–2 | | 2–2 | | | 2–1 | | | 1–3 | | 2–0 | | 1–2 | 0–4 | 1–1 | | 2–0 | 3–0 |
| Palmeiras | 2–0 | 2–0 | 0–0 | | 4–1 | | 2–1 | | | | | 2–1 | 2–3 | | 0–0 | 3–0 | | | 1–0 | |
| Paulista | 3–1 | 1–1 | | 1–1 | | 2–3 | | 1–1 | | 0–0 | | | | 0–1 | | | | 0–2 | 1–0 | |
| Penapolense | 1–1 | | | | 3–0 | 3–0 | | | | | | 2–0 | | | | 3–0 | 1–1 | 0–2 | 2–1 | 2–0 |
| Ponte Preta | 2–1 | 1–0 | | | | | | 2–0 | 0–0 | 1–0 | 1–2 | | 2–0 | | 3–1 | 1–1 | 3–1 | | | |
| Santos | | 3–0 | | 0–0 | 2–1 | | | 2–1 | 2–2 | | | 1–3 | 2–1 | | | | 1–1 | 3–1 | | 2–1 |
| São Bernardo | 2–2 | | | | | 2–0 | 2–0 | | 1–2 | | | 0–0 | | | 1–3 | | 4–1 | 1–2 | | 0–3 |
| São Caetano | | 0–1 | 1–2 | | | 3–0 | 0–2 | 0–3 | | | 1–1 | 0–2 | | | | | | 2–4 | | 2–2 |
| São Paulo | 2–1 | | 2–0 | 1–2 | | 3–2 | 3–0 | 2–0 | | 3–2 | 0–0 | | | 0–0 | | | | | | 0–1 |
| União Barbarense | | 1–1 | 0–0 | | | | | | 1–2 | | | | | 1–1 | 0–4 | 0–0 | 0–0 | 1–2 | | 1–1 |
| XV de Piracicaba | | 4–1 | 2–0 | 1–1 | 2–3 | | 1–1 | 2–2 | | | 3–3 | 2–1 | | 2–2 | | | | | | |

Updated to match(es) played on 21 April 2013. Source: Globo Esporte
Legend: Blue = home team win; Yellow = draw; Red = away team win.

== Knockout stage ==
=== Bracket ===
Quarterfinals
1 | São Paulo | 1
8 | Penapolense | 0
4 | Ponte Preta | 0
5 | Corinthians | 4
2 | Mogi Mirim | 6
7 | Botafogo–SP | 0
3 | Santos | 1 (4)
6 | Palmeiras | 1 (2)

Semifinals
1 | São Paulo | 0 (3)
5 | Corinthians | 0 (4)
2 | Mogi Mirim | 1 (4)
3 | Santos | 1 (5)

Finals
5 | Corinthians | 2 | 1 | 3
3 | Santos | 1 | 1 | 2

== Troféu do Interior ==
Semifinals
Ponte Preta | 1
Linense | 0
Botafogo–SP | 1
Penapolense | 4

Final
Ponte Preta | 0 | 4 | 4
Penapolense | 0 | 2 | 2

== Statistics ==
=== Top goalscorers ===
As of 22 May 2013

| Rank | Player | Club | Goals |
|---|---|---|---|
| 1 | (Brazil) William | Ponte Preta | 13 |
| 2 | (Brazil) Neymar | Santos | 12 |
| 3 | (Brazil) Fernando Baiano | São Bernardo | 10 |
| 3 | (Brazil) Guarú | Penapolense | 10 |
| 4 | (Brazil) Lincom | Bragantino | 9 |
| 4 | (Brazil) Marcelo Macedo | Paulista | 9 |
| 4 | (Brazil) Roni | Mogi Mirim | 9 |
| 4 | (Brazil) Cícero | Santos | 9 |
| 5 | (Peru) Paolo Guerrero | Corinthians | 8 |
| 5 | (Brazil) Henrique | Mogi Mirim | 8 |
| 5 | (Brazil) Luis Fabiano | São Paulo | 8 |

=== Scoring ===
As of 22 May 2013

- First goal of the season: Luís Fabiano for São Paulo against Mirassol (19 January 2013)
- Fastest goal of the season: 2 minutes, Márcio Diogo for XV de Piracicaba against Palmeiras (3 February 2013)
- Largest winning margin: 6 goals
  - Mogi Mirim 6–0 Botafogo (27 April 2013)
- Highest scoring game: 8 goals
  - Mirassol 6–2 Palmeiras (27 March 2013)
- Most goals scored in a match by a single team: 6 goals
  - Mirassol 6–2 Palmeiras (27 March 2013)
- Most goals scored in a match by a losing team: 3 goals
  - Mirassol 4–3 Botafogo-SP (16 February 2013)
  - Mirassol 3–4 São Bernardo (16 March 2013)

=== Discipline ===
As of 22 May 2013

- Most yellow cards (club): 82
  - Botafogo-SP
- Most yellow cards (player): 11
  - Dudu (São Bernardo)
- Most red cards (club): 12
  - Botafogo-SP
- Most red cards (player): 3
  - Cris (Botafogo-SP)

== Awards ==
=== Team of the year ===
| Pos. | Player | Club |
|---|---|---|
| GK | (Brazil) Rafael | Santos |
| DF | (Brazil) Alessandro | Corinthians |
| DF | (Brazil) Gil | Corinthians |
| DF | (Brazil) Cleber | Ponte Preta |
| DF | (Brazil) Rodrigo Biro | Penapolense |
| MF | (Brazil) Danilo | Corinthians |
| MF | (Brazil) Paulinho | Corinthians |
| MF | (Brazil) Ralf | Corinthians |
| MF | (Brazil) Jádson | São Paulo |
| FW | (Peru) Guerrero | Corinthians |
| FW | (Brazil) Neymar | Santos |

Source Globo Esporte
Last updated: 16 May 2013

Player of the Season

The Player of the Year was awarded to Neymar.

Young Player of the Season

The Young Player of the Year was awarded to Rodrigo Biro.

Countryside Best Player of the Season

The Countryside Best Player of the Year was awarded to Roni.

Top scorer of the Season

The top scorer of the season was William, who scored 13 goals.
