= 2008 Sport Club Corinthians Paulista season =

Corinthians
2008 season
- Chairman: Andrés Sanchez
- Manager: Mano Menezes
- Campeonato Brasileiro Série B: Winners
- Campeonato Paulista A1: 5th
- Copa do Brasil: Runners-up
- Top goalscorer: League: All: Germán Herrera (12)

The 2008 season was the 98th edition of the football club Sport Club Corinthians Paulista, their debut in Série B.

== Club ==
=== Management ===
Position	Staff
Technical manager	(Brazil) Antônio Carlos Zago
Manager	(Brazil) Mano Menezes
Assistant coach	(Brazil) Sidnei Lobo
Fitness coach	(Brazil) Flávio Trevisan
Assistant fitness coach	(Brazil) Antônio Carlos Bona
Goalkeeping coach	(Brazil) Mauri Costa Lima

Last updated: 8 January 2008
Source: Staff

=== Team kit ===
The team kit for the season was produced by Nike and the shirt sponsor was Medial Saúde.

Home	Away	Away Alternative

== Squad ==
=== Statistics ===
Last updated on 2008-10-24

No.	Pos.	Name	Brasileiro Série B		Copa do Brasil		Campeonato Paulista		Other		Total	
No.	Pos.	Name	Apps	Goals	Apps	Goals	Apps	Goals	Apps	Goals	Apps	Goals
1	GK	(Brazil) Felipe	27	-17	11	-12	17	-14	2	0	57	-33
2	DF	(Brazil) Fábio Ferreira	17	1	4	0	1	0	1	0	23	1
3	DF	(Brazil) Chicão	17	7	9	1	17	0	3	0	36	8
4	DF	(Brazil) William	30	1	11	1	18	0	1	0	60	2
5	DF	(Brazil) Alessandro	19	1	4	0	10	0	1	0	34	1
6	DF	(Brazil) Cristian	5	0	0	0	0	0	0	0	5	0
7	MF	(Brazil) Elias	26	3	0	0	0	0	0	0	26	3
8	MF	(Brazil) Perdigão	4	0	4	0	12	0	1	0	21	0
9	MF	(Brazil) Morais	12	2	0	0	0	0	0	0	12	2
10	MF	(Brazil) Douglas	28	8	0	0	0	0	1	0	29	8
11	MF	(Brazil) Marcel	2	0	3	1	4	0	3	0	12	1
12	GK	(Brazil) Wéverton	0	0	0	0	0	0	1	-1	1	-1
13	DF	(Brazil) Renato	0	0	0	0	0	0	0	0	0	0
14	MF	(Brazil) Cássio	3	0	0	0	0	0	0	0	3	0
15	MF	(Brazil) Diogo Rincon	11	0	9	4	6	0	1	0	27	4
16	MF	(Brazil) Marcelo Oliveira	0	0	0	0	0	0	0	0	0	0
17	FW	(Argentina) Germán Herrera	26	10	11	5	14	2	3	1	54	18
18	DF	(Brazil) Diego	0	0	0	0	0	0	0	0	0	0
19	MF	(Brazil) Lulinha	23	0	8	1	16	1	2	1	49	3
20	MF	(Brazil) Carlos Alberto	22	0	9	1	11	0	3	0	44	1
21	MF	(Brazil) Bruno Octávio	1	0	1	0	12	0	1	0	15	0
22	GK	(Brazil) Júlio César	4	0	0	0	2	-1	2	0	6	-1
23	FW	(Brazil) Otacílio Neto	4	0	0	0	0	0	0	0	4	0
25	FW	(Uruguay) Acosta	12	2	10	3	0	2(-1)	0	0	22	7(-1)
26	MF	(Brazil) Rafinha	0	0	1	0	0	0	1	0	2	0
27	DF	(Brazil) André Santos	29	8	10	2	18	6	2	1	59	17
28	MF	(Brazil) Nílton	10	0	4	0	2	0	1	0	17	0
29	MF	(Brazil) Eduardo Ramos	18	0	6	0	0	0	0	0	24	0
30	DF	(Brazil) Alves	0	0	0	0	0	0	0	0	0	0
31	FW	(Brazil) Dentinho	23	13	11	4	18	6	1	1	43	24
32	MF	(Brazil) Fabinho	12	1	9	0	12	1	1	0	34	2
33	DF	(Brazil) Diogo	1	0	0	0	0	0	0	0	1	0
34	DF	(Brazil) Wellington Saci	13	1	2	0	0	0	0	0	15	1
35	DF	(Brazil) Dênis	7	1	0	0	0	0	0	0	7	1
36	FW	(Brazil) Careca	8	1	0	0	0	0	0	0	8	1
38	FW	(Brazil) Bebeto	6	1	0	0	0	0	0	0	6	1
39	MF	(Brazil) Almeida	0	0	0	0	0	0	0	0	0	0
--	MF	(Brazil) Bóvio	0	0	3	0	11	0	1	1	15	1
--	MF	(Brazil) Cajú	0	0	0	0	1	0	1	0	2	0
--	MF	(Brazil) Carlão	2	0	4	0	14	1	2	0	22	1
--	DF	(Brazil) Coelho	0	0	0	0	4	0	1	0	5	0
--	MF	(Brazil) Dinelson	0	0	0	0	0	0	0	0	0	0
--	DF	(Brazil) Eduardo	0	0	0	0	2	0	1	0	3	0
9	FW	(Brazil) Finazzi	0	0	1	0	7	3	2	1	10	4
--	MF	(Brazil) Héverton	0	0	0	0	7	1	2	0	9	1
--	FW	(Brazil) Lima	2	1	0	0	2	0	3	0	7	1
--	MF	(Brazil) Marcelo Oliveira	0	0	0	0	0	0	0	0	0	0
--	DF	(Brazil) Éverton Ribeiro	1	0	2	0	7	0	2	0	12	0
--	DF	(Chile) Cristián Suárez	0	0	1	0	2	0	2	0	5	0
--	DF	(Brazil) Valença	0	0	0	0	0	0	2	0	2	0

== Season ==
=== Pre-season & Friendlies ===
==== Matches ====
12 January 2008
16:10 (UTC-3)

Corinthians	3–0	Inter de Limeira
Finazzi 15' André Santos 60' Dentinho 69'	report (in Portuguese)

Spa Sport Resort-Itu

7 February 2008
16:00 (UTC-3)

Corinthians	1–1	Paulista
Bóvio 55'	report (in Portuguese)	60' Júlio César

Spa Sport Resort-Itu

26 April 2008

Cene-MS	0–3	Corinthians
	report (in Portuguese)	64' Lulinha Herrera 90+2' Acosta

Morenão Stadium - Campo Grande
Referee: Marcos Mateus Pereira

=== Campeonato Paulista ===
==== Matches ====
17 January 2008
21:45 (UTC-3)

Corinthians	3–0	Guarani
Finazzi 65' 90+1' (pen.) Dentinho 72'	report (in Portuguese)

Morumbi Stadium - São Paulo
Attendance: 29.084
Referee: Philippe Lombard

20 January 2008
18:10 (UTC-3)

São Caetano	3–1	Corinthians
Fábio Luis 19' Acosta 33' (o.g.) Luan 71'	report (in Portuguese)	85' Dentinho

Papa João Paulo II Stadium - Mogi-Mirim
Attendance: 7.635
Referee: Wilson Luiz Seneme

23 January 2008
21:45 (UTC-3)

Corinthians	2–0	Paulista
André Santos 29'; Acosta 59'	report (in Portuguese)

Morumbi Stadium - São Paulo
Attendance: 9.515
Referee: Leonardo Ferreira Lima

27 January 2008
16:00 (UTC-3)

São Paulo	0–0	Corinthians
	report (in Portuguese)

Morumbi Stadium - São Paulo
Attendance: 41.221
Referee: Sálvio Spinola Fagundes Filho

30 January 2008
21:45 (UTC-3)

Sertãozinho	0–0	Corinthians
	report (in Portuguese)

Santa Cruz Stadium - Ribeirão Preto
Attendance: 25.444
Referee: Paulo César de Oliveira

2 February 2008
16:00 (UTC-3)

Corinthians	0–0	Mirassol
	report (in Portuguese)

Morumbi Stadium - São Paulo
Attendance: 17.435
Referee: José Henrique de Carvalho

6 February 2008
21:45 (UTC-3)

Grêmio Barueri	1–1	Corinthians
Ávalos 29'	report (in Portuguese)	35' Dentinho

Arena Barueri Stadium - Barueri
Attendance: 10.514
Referee: Marcelo Pietro Alfieri

10 February 2008
16:00 (UTC-3)

Ituano	1–2	Corinthians
Lino 82'	report (in Portuguese)	3' André Santos; 52' (o.g.) Boiadeiro

Novelli Júnior Stadium - Itu
Attendance: 10.889
Referee: Flávio Rodrigues Guerra

17 February 2008
16:00 (UTC-3)

Corinthians	1–1	Bragantino
Lulinha 43'	report (in Portuguese)	49' Da Silva

Morumbi Stadium - São Paulo
Attendance: 24.779
Referee: Élcio Paschoal Borborema

20 February 2008
21:45 (UTC-3)

Corinthians	1–0	Portuguesa
Herrera 39'	report (in Portuguese)

Morumbi Stadium - São Paulo
Attendance: 8.895
Referee: Guilherme Cereta de Lima

24 February 2008
16:00 (UTC-3)

Ponte Preta	0–1	Corinthians
	report (in Portuguese)	58' Acosta

Moisés Lucarelli Stadium - Campinas
Attendance: 16.267
Referee: Marcelo Rogério

2 March 2008
16:00 (UTC-3)

Corinthians	0–1	Palmeiras
	report (in Portuguese)	77' Valdívia

Morumbi Stadium - São Paulo
Attendance: 48.930
Referee: Rodrigo Braghetto

9 March 2008
16:00 (UTC-3)

Corinthians	2–0	Guaratinguetá
Dentinho 3' 51'	report (in Portuguese)

Morumbi Stadium - São Paulo
Attendance: 17.931
Referee: José Henrique de Carvalho

12 March 2008
21:45 (UTC-3)

Rio Preto	0–1	Corinthians
	report (in Portuguese)	50' Héverton

Rio Pretão Stadium - Rio Preto
Attendance: 12.484
Referee: Robério Pereira Pires

15 March 2008
16:00 (UTC-3)

Corinthians	2–2	Juventus
Fabinho 19'; André Santos 58'	report (in Portuguese)	60' Marcus Vinícius; 55' Lima

Morumbi Stadium - São Paulo
Attendance: 15.006
Referee: Salvio Spinola Fagundes Filho

23 March 2008
16:00 (UTC-3)

Corinthians	1–0	Rio Claro
Dentinho 31'	report (in Portuguese)

Morumbi Stadium - São Paulo
Attendance: 13.211
Referee: Luiz Flávio de Oliveira

26 March 2008
21:45 (UTC-3)

Santos	2–1	Corinthians
Sebastián Pinto 15'; Kléber Pereira 52'	report (in Portuguese)	47' Carlão

Vila Belmiro Stadium - Santos
Attendance: 15.270
Referee: Salvio Spinola Fagundes Filho

30 March 2008
16:00 (UTC-3)

Corinthians	3–1	Marília
Herrera 12'; André Santos 79' 89'	report (in Portuguese)	60' Júlio César

Morumbi Stadium - São Paulo
Attendance: 18.360
Referee: Rodrigo Martins Cintra

6 April 2008
16:00 (UTC-3)

Noroeste	3–2	Corinthians
Edno 30' Edylton 76' Leandrinho 87'	report (in Portuguese)	44' André Santos; 70' Finazzi

Alfredo de Castilho Stadium - Bauru
Attendance: 12.515
Referee: Cleber Wellington Abade

==== Classification ====
First phase
Pos	Team	Pld	W	D	L	GF	GA	GD	Pts	Qualification or relegation
3	São Paulo	19	11	5	3	31	22	+9	38	Advances to Semifinals
4	Ponte Preta	19	10	5	4	36	23	+13	35	Advances to Semifinals
5	Corinthians	19	9	6	4	24	15	+9	33	
6	Barueri	19	10	2	7	34	24	+10	32	Qualification for Campeonato do Interior
7	Santos	19	9	4	6	28	23	+5	31	

Updated to match(es) played on April 6, 2008. Source: RSSSF Brazil
Rules for classification: 1st points; 2nd wins; 3rd goal difference; 4th goals scored

==== Results summary ====
Overall								Home						Away					
Pld	W	D	L	GF	GA	GD	Pts	W	D	L	GF	GA	GD	W	D	L	GF	GA	GD
19	9	6	4	24	15	+9	33	6	3	1	15	5	+10	3	3	3	9	10	−1

Last updated: 6 April 2008.
Source: 2008 Campeonato Paulista

Pld = Matches played; W = Matches won; D = Matches drawn; L = Matches lost;

=== Copa do Brasil ===
==== First round ====
13 February 2008
21:45 (UTC-3)

Barras-PI	0–6	Corinthians
	report (in Portuguese)	20' 22' 41' Dentinho 56' Lulinha; 70' Herrera 90+1' Marcel

Serra Dourada Stadium - Goiânia
Attendance: 5.355
Referee: André Luiz de Freitas Castro

==== Second round ====
19 March 2008
21:45 (UTC-3)

Fortaleza-CE	1–2	Corinthians
Simão 30'	report (in Portuguese)	32' Willian; 58' Acosta

Castelão Stadium - Fortaleza
Attendance: 29.319
Referee: Leandro Pedro Vuaden

3 April 2008
21:30 (UTC-3)

Corinthians	2–0	Fortaleza-CE
Diogo Rincón 25'; André Santos 58'	report (in Portuguese)

Morumbi Stadium - São Paulo
Attendance: 9.417
Referee: Jailson Macêdo Freitas

==== Round of 16 ====
16 April 2008
21:50 (UTC-3)

Goiás-GO	3–1	Corinthians
Paulo Baier 38' 42'; Evandro 58'	report (in Portuguese)	55' Diogo Rincon

Serra Dourada Stadium - Goiânia
Attendance: 17.927
Referee: Marcelo de Lima Henrique

30 April 2008
22:00 (UTC-3)

Corinthians	4–0	Goiás-GO
Diogo Rincon 4' 16' André Santos 22' Herrera 30'	report (in Portuguese)

Morumbi Stadium - São Paulo
Attendance: 50.773
Referee: Leandro Pedro Vuaden

==== Quarter-finals ====
6 May 2008
21:00 (UTC-3)

Corinthians	2–1	São Caetano-SP
Herrera 67' 87'	report (in Portuguese)	83' Luan

Morumbi Stadium - São Paulo
Attendance: 46.219
Referee: Rodrigo Braghetto

13 May 2008
20:30 (UTC-3)

São Caetano-SP	1–3	Corinthians
Tuta 88'	report (in Portuguese)	27' Chicão 50' André Santos 83' Acosta

Santa Cruz Stadium - Ribeirão Preto
Attendance: 21.437
Referee: José Henrique de Carvalho

==== Semi-finals ====
20 May 2008
20:30 (UTC-3)

Botafogo-RJ	2–1	Corinthians
Lúcio Flávio 55' (pen.); Jorge Henrique 88'	report (in Portuguese)	22' Carlos Alberto

Engenhão Stadium - Rio de Janeiro
Attendance: 30.737
Referee: Leonardo Gaciba da Silva

28 May 2008
21:50 (UTC-3)

Corinthians	2–1	Botafogo-RJ
Acosta 51'; Chicão 64'	report (in Portuguese)	54' Renato Silva
Penalties
Chicão (penalty scored); Herrera (penalty scored); Nílton (penalty scored); Alessandro (penalty scored); Acosta (penalty scored)	5 – 4	(penalty scored) Lúcio Flávio; (penalty scored) Alexsandro; (penalty scored) André Luís; (penalty scored) Jorge Henrique; (penalty missed) Zé Carlos

Morumbi Stadium - São Paulo
Attendance: 61.752
Referee: Evandro Rogério Roman

==== Final ====
4 June 2008
21:50 (UTC-3)

Corinthians	3–1	Sport-PE
Dentinho 18'; Herrera 23'; Acosta 76'	report (in Portuguese)	90+1' Enílton

Morumbi Stadium - São Paulo
Attendance: 63.871
Referee: Héber Roberto Lopes

11 June 2008
21:50 (UTC-3)

Sport-PE	2–0	Corinthians
Carlinhos Bala 34'; Luciano Henrique 37'	report (in Portuguese)

Ilha do Retiro Stadium - Recife
Attendance: 33.921
Referee: Alicio Pena Júnior

=== Campeonato Brasileiro Série B ===
==== Matches ====
10 May 2008
16:00 (UTC-3)

Corinthians	3–2	CRB
Herrera 2' 70'; Chicão 28'	report (in Portuguese)	1' Márcio; 87' Helder

Pacaembu - São Paulo
Attendance: 34.856
Referee: Gutemberg de Paula Fonseca (RJ)

17 May 2008
16:00 (UTC-3)

Gama	1–3	Corinthians
Adriano Magrão 70'	report (in Portuguese)	12' Herrera 73' Douglas 90' Acosta

Boca do Jacaré - Taguatinga
Attendance: 21.486
Referee: Célio Amorim (SC)

24 May 2008
16:00 (UTC-3)

ABC-RN	0–1	Corinthians
	report (in Portuguese)	77' Douglas

Frasqueirão - Natal
Attendance: 14.400
Referee: Elmo Alves Resende Cunha (GO)

31 May 2008
16:10 (UTC-3)

Corinthians	2–0	Fortaleza
Alessandro 22'; Herrera 73'	report (in Portuguese)

Pacaembu - São Paulo
Attendance: 22.194
Referee: Sérgio da Silva Carvalho (DF)

7 June 2008
16:10 (UTC-3)

Grêmio Barueri	1–4	Corinthians
Márcio Careca 20'	report (in Portuguese)	10' Acosta 21' (o.g.) Ávalos; 28' Lima 61' Douglas

Arena Barueri - Barueri
Attendance: 6.781
Referee: Rodrigo Martins Cintra (SP)

14 June 2008
16:00 (UTC-3)

Corinthians	4–1	Brasiliense
Willian 16' Herrera 66'; Chicão 71' André Santos 89'	report (in Portuguese)	91' Adrianinho

Pacaembu - São Paulo
Attendance: 19.164
Referee: Antônio Hora Filho (SE)

21 June 2008
16:00 (UTC-3)

Ponte Preta	1–1	Corinthians
Danilo Neco 85'	report (in Portuguese)	5' Herrera

Móises Lucarelli - Campinas
Attendance: not available
Referee: Phillippe Lombard (SP)

28 June 2008
16:00 (UTC-3)

Bragantino	1–1	Corinthians
Pará 52'	report (in Portuguese)	60' Chicão

Marcelo Stéfani - Bragança Paulista
Attendance: not available
Referee: Claudinei Foratti Silva (SP)

5 July 2008
16:00 (UTC-3)

Corinthians	1–0	São Caetano
Dentinho 55'	report (in Portuguese)

Pacaembu - São Paulo
Attendance: 21.294
Referee: Luiz Flavio de Oliveira (SP)

8 July 2008
20:30 (UTC-3)

Corinthians	5–0	Marília
Chicão 20'; Dentinho 49' 62'; André Santos 77'; Denis 82'	report (in Portuguese)

Pacaembu - São Paulo
Attendance: not available
Referee: Wilson Luiz Seneme (FIFA-SP)

12 July 2008
16:00 (UTC-3)

Santo André	1–1	Corinthians
Marcelinho Carioca 26'	report (in Portuguese)	76' Wellington Saci

Bruno Daniel - Santo André
Attendance: not available
Referee: Guilherme Cereta de Lima (SP)

19 July 2008
16:00 (UTC-3)

Corinthians	0–1	Bahia
	report (in Portuguese)	9' Elias

Pacaembu - São Paulo
Attendance: 36.487
Referee: Willian Marcelo Souza Nery (RJ)

22 July 2008
20:30 (UTC-3)

Ceará	2–2	Corinthians
Luiz Carlos 14' 28'	report (in Portuguese)	8' 81' Dentinho

Castelão - Fortaleza
Attendance: 51.064
Referee: Emerson Luiz Sobral (PE)

26 July 2008
16:00 (UTC-3)

Paraná	0–2	Corinthians
	report (in Portuguese)	70' 80' Dentinho

Vila Capanema - Curitiba
Attendance: 16.016
Referee: Nielson Nogueira Dias (PE)

2 August 2008
16:00 (UTC-3)

Corinthians	0–0	Criciúma
	report (in Portuguese)

Pacaembu - São Paulo
Attendance: 30.961
Referee: Sandro Meira Ricci (DF)

5 August 2008
20:30 (UTC-3)

Corinthians	2–0	Juventude
Fabinho 45'; Herrera 91'	report (in Portuguese)

Pacaembu - São Paulo
Attendance: 16.198
Referee: Luis Antonio Silva Santos (RJ)

9 August 2008
16:00 (UTC-3)

Vila Nova-GO	2–1	Corinthians
Alex Oliveira 33'; Pedro Jr. 88'	report (in Portuguese)	51' André Santos

Serra Dourada - Goiânia
Attendance: 27.648
Referee: Wilson Souza de Mendonça (PE)

12 August 2008
20:30 (UTC-3)

Avaí	1–1	Corinthians
Evando 83'	report (in Portuguese)	30' Douglas

Ressacada - Florianópolis
Attendance: not available
Referee: Leandro Vuaden (FIFA-RS)

16 August 2008
16:00 (UTC-3)

Corinthians	2–0	América-RN
Douglas 56'; Anderson Bill (o.g.) 76'	report (in Portuguese)

Pacaembu - São Paulo
Attendance: not available
Referee: Péricles Bassols Pegado Cortez (RJ)

22 August 2008
16:00 (UTC-3)

CRB	1–2	Corinthians
Tozin 82'	report (in Portuguese)	7' Herrera; 45' Careca

Rei Pelé - Maceió
Attendance: 7.027
Referee: Evandro Rogério Roman (FIFA-PR)

26 August 2008
20:30 (UTC-3)

Corinthians	5–0	Gama
Douglas 5'; Herrera 31'; André Santos 64'; Elias 66'; Bebeto 91'	report (in Portuguese)

Pacaembu - São Paulo
Attendance: 13.646
Referee: Jaílson Macedo Freitas (BA)

30 August 2008
16:00 (UTC-3)

Corinthians	4–0	ABC-RN
Elias 21'; Douglas 27'; André Santos 65'; Chicão 86'	report pt

Pacaembu - São Paulo
Attendance: not available
Referee: Wilton Pereira Sampaio (DF)

6 September 2008
16:00 (UTC-3)

Fortaleza	1–3	Corinthians
Bambam 54'	report (in Portuguese)	22' Chicão; 36' (o.g.) Preto; 68' André Santos

Castelão - Fortaleza
Attendance: not available
Referee: Pablo dos Santos Alves (RJ)

13 September 2008
16:00 (UTC-3)

Corinthians	1–0	Grêmio Barueri
André Santos 94'	report (in Portuguese)

Pacaembu - São Paulo
Attendance: 27.678
Referee: Domingos de Jesus Viana Filho (PA)

16 September 2008
20:30 (UTC-3)

Brasiliense	1–1	Corinthians
Marcinho 46'	report (in Portuguese)	50' Elias

Boca do Jacaré - Taguatinga
Attendance: not available
Referee: Arnoldo Vasconcelos Figarela (RO)

20 September 2008
16:00 (UTC-3)

Corinthians	3–0	Ponte Preta
Chicão 23'; Morais 44'; Douglas 91'	report (in Portuguese)

Pacaembu - São Paulo
Attendance: 23.814
Referee: Wagner Tardelli (FIFA-SC)

24 September 2008
22:00 (UTC-3)

Corinthians	2–0	Bragantino
Dentinho 23'; André Santos 52'	report (in Portuguese)

Pacaembu - São Paulo
Attendance: 14.007
Referee: Álvaro Azeredo Quelhas (MG)

27 September 2008
16:00 (UTC-3)

São Caetano	2–2	Corinthians
Tuta 8' 33'	report (in Portuguese)	14' Dentinho; 56' Herrera

Brinco de Ouro da Princesa - Campinas
Attendance: not available
Referee: Marcelo Aparecido Ribeiro de Souza (SP)

4 October 2008
16:00 (UTC-3)

Marília	1–1	Corinthians
Altair 61'	report (in Portuguese)	13' Fábio Ferreira

Estádio do Café - Londrina
Attendance: not available
Referee: Rodrigo Guarizo Ferreira do Amaral (SP)

11 October 2008
16:00 (UTC-3)

Corinthians	2–2	Santo André
Dentinho 73' 89'	report (in Portuguese)	7' Willians; 55' Osny

Pacaembu - São Paulo
Attendance: 35.666
Referee: Ricardo Marques Ribeiro (MG)

18 October 2008
16:00 (UTC-3)

Bahia	0–3	Corinthians
	report (in Portuguese)	8' Morais; 56' 88' Dentinho

Jóia da Princesa - Feira de Santana
Attendance: not available
Referee: Wallace Nascimento Valente (ES)

25 October 2008
16:00 (UTC-3)

Corinthians	2–0	Ceará
Douglas 8'; Chicão 49'	report (in Portuguese)

Pacaembu - São Paulo
Attendance: 35.426
Referee: Maurício Aparecido de Siqueira (MT)
Corinthians promoted to Série A

1 November 2008
16:20 (UTC-3)

Corinthians	2–1	Paraná
Chicão 43'; Dentinho 63'	report (in Portuguese)	52' Fabinho

Pacaembu - São Paulo
Attendance: 27.561
Referee: Alício Pena Júnior (FIFA-MG)

8 November 2008
16:20 (UTC-3)

Criciúma	0–2	Corinthians
	report (in Portuguese)	23' Chicão; 34' Cristian

Heriberto Hülse - Criciúma
Attendance: not available
Referee: Márcio Chagas da Silva (RS)
Corinthians Série B champion

12 November 2008
22:00 (UTC-3)

Juventude	1–2	Corinthians
Egídio 68'	report (in Portuguese)	7' Morais; 86' Cristian

Alfredo Jaconi - Caxias do Sul
Attendance: 9.445
Referee: Willian Marcelo Souza Nery (RJ)

15 November 2008
16:20 (UTC-3)

Corinthians	3–1	Vila Nova-GO
Herrera 7' 32' Alessandro 36'	report (in Portuguese)	Pedro Júnior 83'

Pacaembu - São Paulo
Attendance: 23.339
Referee: Djalma Santos Beltrami (RJ)

22 November 2008
16:00 (UTC-3)

Corinthians	3–2	Avaí
Herrera 3' 37'; André Santos 79'	report (in Portuguese)	André Turatto 5' Marcus Vinícius 84'

Pacaembu - São Paulo
Attendance: 32.774
Referee: Péricles Pegado Cortez (RJ)

29 November 2008
16:00 (UTC-3)

América-RN	2–0	Corinthians
Souza 5'; Aloísio 91'	report (in Portuguese)

Machadão - Natal
Attendance: not available
Referee: Carlos Eugenio Simon (RS)

==== Classification ====
Pos	Team	Pld	W	D	L	GF	GA	GD	Pts	Promotion or relegation
1	Corinthians	38	25	10	3	79	29	+50	85	Promotion to Série A 2009
2	Santo André	38	19	11	8	71	45	+26	68	Promotion to Série A 2009
3	Avaí	38	18	13	7	71	40	+31	67	Promotion to Série A 2009
4	Barueri	38	20	3	15	58	55	+3	63	Promotion to Série A 2009
5	Ponte Preta	38	17	7	14	54	46	+8	58	

==== Results summary ====
Overall								Home						Away					
Pld	W	D	L	GF	GA	GD	Pts	W	D	L	GF	GA	GD	W	D	L	GF	GA	GD
35	23	10	2	73	24	+49	79	14	1	1	40	7	+33	9	9	1	33	17	+16

Last updated: 13 November 2008.
Source: 2008 Campeonato Brasileiro Série B

=== Results by round ===
Round	1	2	3	4	5	6	7	8	9	10	11	12	13	14	15	16	17	18	19	20	21	22	23	24	25	26	27	28	29	30	31	32	33	34	35	36	37	38
Ground	H	A	A	H	A	H	A	A	H	H	A	H	A	A	A	H	A	A	H	A	H	H	A	H	A	H	H	A	A	H	A	H	H	A	A	H	H	A
Result	W	W	W	W	W	W	D	D	W	W	D	L	D	W	D	W	L	D	W	W	W	W	W	W	D	W	W	D	D	D	W	W	W	W	W			

Updated to match(es) played on 13 November 2008. Source: 2008 Campeonato Brasileiro Série B
A = Away; H = Home; W = Win; D = Draw; L = Loss
