= List of SC Corinthians Paulista seasons =

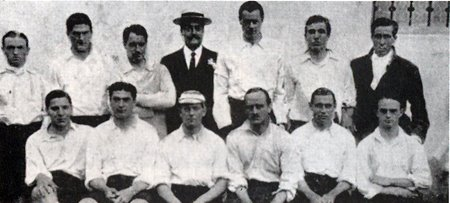
The first Corinthians squad during the 1910 season

Sport Club Corinthians Paulista is a Brazilian multisport club based in Tatuapé, a bairro in the city of São Paulo. Although they compete in a number of different sports, Corinthians is mostly known for its association football team. The club was formed in Bom Retiro in 1910 as a homage to Corinthian Football Club, an English football club based in London. Corinthians played their first competitive match on March 23, 1913, when they entered the 1913 Campeonato Paulista, commonly referred to as the Paulistão.

The club has won a total of 44 major trophies, including the Brasileirão six times, the Paulistão a record 27 times, the Copa do Brasil three times, the Torneio Rio – São Paulo a joint-record five times (including four shared titles), the Supercopa do Brasil once (being one of two clubs to ever win it), the Copa Libertadores once and the FIFA Club World Cup twice. Corinthians is the only club to have won the Copa Libertadores undefeated in the current format. It is also the only club with a flawless record at the FIFA Club World Cup managing to win both occasions it participated in.

This list details the club's achievements in major competitions, and the top scorers for each season.

== Key ==
Key to colours and symbols:

| 1st or C | Winners |
| 2nd | Runners-up |
| 3rd | Third place |
| ↑ | Promoted |
| ↓ | Relegated |
| ♦ | Top scorer in division |

Key to league record:

- Season = The year and article of the season
- Pos = Final position
- Pld = Matches played
- W = Matches won
- D = Matches drawn
- L = Matches lost
- GF = Goals scored
- GA = Goals against
- Pts = Points

Key to cup record:

- En-dash (–) = Corinthians did not participate
- GS = Group stage
- GS2 = Second group stage
- 1R/2R = First round/stage, second round/stage, etc.
- R16/R32 = Round of 16, round of 32, etc.
- QF = Quarter-finals
- SF = Semi-finals
- F = Runners-up
- W = Winners

== Seasons ==
=== Pre-Campeonato Brasileiro era ===
| Season | Regional league | | National league | | Other competitions | | Season Top scorer | |
| Season | Regional league | | National league | | Other competitions | | Name(s) | Goals |
|---|---|---|---|---|---|---|---|---|
| 1910 | — | — | | | — | — | | |
| 1911 | — | — | | | — | — | | |
| 1912 | — | — | | | — | — | | |
| 1913 | Campeonato Paulista | 4th | | | — | — | | |
| 1914 | Campeonato Paulista | C | | | — | — | | |
| 1915 | — | — | | | — | | | |
| 1916 | Campeonato Paulista | C | | | — | — | | |
| 1917 | Campeonato Paulista | 3rd | | | — | — | | |
| 1918 | Campeonato Paulista | 2nd | | | — | — | | |
| 1919 | Campeonato Paulista | 3rd | | | — | — | | |
| 1920 | Campeonato Paulista | 3rd | | | — | — | | |
| 1921 | Campeonato Paulista | 3rd | | | — | — | | |
| 1922 | Campeonato Paulista | C | | | — | — | | |
| 1923 | Campeonato Paulista | C | | | — | — | | |
| 1924 | Campeonato Paulista | C | | | — | — | | |
| 1925 | Campeonato Paulista | 2nd | | | — | — | | |
| 1926 | Campeonato Paulista | 3rd | | | — | — | | |
| 1927 | Campeonato Paulista | 3rd | | | — | — | | |
| 1928 | Campeonato Paulista | C | | | — | — | | |
| 1929 | Campeonato Paulista | C | | | Taça dos Campeões Estaduais | C | | |
| 1930 | Campeonato Paulista | C | | | — | — | | |
| 1931 | Campeonato Paulista | 6th | | | — | — | | |
| 1932 | Campeonato Paulista | 5th | | | — | — | | |
| 1933 | Campeonato Paulista | 4th | | | Torneio Rio-São Paulo | 6th | | |
| 1934 | Campeonato Paulista | 4th | | | — | — | | |
| 1935 | Campeonato Paulista | 3rd | | | — | — | | |
| 1936 | Campeonato Paulista | 2nd | | | — | — | | |
| 1937 | Campeonato Paulista | C | | | — | — | | |
| 1938 | Campeonato Paulista | C | | | — | — | | |
| 1939 | Campeonato Paulista | C | | | — | — | | |
| 1940 | Campeonato Paulista | 4th | | | Torneio Rio-São Paulo | — (Note: The tournament was interrupted in the first half and there was no champion.) | | |
| 1941 | Campeonato Paulista | C | | | Taça dos Campeões Estaduais | C | | |
| 1942 | Campeonato Paulista | 2nd | | | — | — | | |
| 1943 | Campeonato Paulista | 2nd | | | — | — | | |
| 1944 | Campeonato Paulista | 3rd | | | — | — | | |
| 1945 | Campeonato Paulista | 2nd | | | — | — | | |
| 1946 | Campeonato Paulista | 2nd | | | — | — | | |
| 1947 | Campeonato Paulista | 2nd | | | — | — | | |
| 1948 | Campeonato Paulista | 4th | | | — | — | | |
| 1949 | Campeonato Paulista | 6th | | | — | — | | |
| 1950 | Campeonato Paulista | 5th | | | Torneio Rio-São Paulo | C | | |
| 1951 | Campeonato Paulista | C | | | Torneio Rio-São Paulo | 2nd | | |
| 1952 | Campeonato Paulista | C | | | Torneio Rio-São Paulo | 3rd | | |
| 1953 | Campeonato Paulista | 3rd | | | Torneio Rio-São Paulo | C | | |
| 1954 | Campeonato Paulista | C | | | Torneio Rio-São Paulo | C | | |
| 1955 | Campeonato Paulista | 2nd | | | Torneio Rio-São Paulo | 10th | | |
| 1956 | Campeonato Paulista | 3rd | | | — | — | | |
| 1957 | Campeonato Paulista | 3rd | | | Torneio Rio-São Paulo | 8th | | |
| 1958 | Campeonato Paulista | 3rd | | | Torneio Rio-São Paulo | 3rd | | |
| 1959 | Campeonato Paulista | 5th | | | Torneio Rio-São Paulo | 9th | | |
| 1960 | Campeonato Paulista | 3rd | | | Torneio Rio-São Paulo | 4th | | |
| 1961 | Campeonato Paulista | 7th | | | Torneio Rio-São Paulo | 6th | | |
| 1962 | Campeonato Paulista | 2nd | | | Torneio Rio-São Paulo | 6th | | |
| 1963 | Campeonato Paulista | 9th | | | Torneio Rio-São Paulo | 2nd | | |
| 1964 | Campeonato Paulista | 4th | | | Torneio Rio-São Paulo | 7th | | |
| 1965 | Campeonato Paulista | 3rd | | | Torneio Rio-São Paulo | 7th | | |
| 1966 | Campeonato Paulista | 2nd | | | Torneio Rio-São Paulo | C (Note: As there was no tiebreaker criteria for points tie, a quadrangular involving Botafogo, Corinthians, Santos and Vasco da Gama should have been played. However, due to the preparation of Brazil national football team to 1966 FIFA World Cup, the CBD decided to proclaim all four clubs as champions.) | | |
| 1967 | Campeonato Paulista | 3rd | Robertão | 3rd | — | — | | |
| 1968 | Campeonato Paulista | 2nd | Robertão | 5th | — | — | | |
| 1969 | Campeonato Paulista | 4th | Robertão | 3rd | — | — | | |
| 1970 | Campeonato Paulista | 5th | Robertão | 9th | — | — | | |

=== Campeonato Brasileiro era ===
| Season | League | | | | | | | | | Copa do Brasil | Supercopa do Brasil | South America | | Other competitions | | Season Top scorer | |
| Season | Division | Pos. | Pl. | W | D | L | GF | GA | Pts | Copa do Brasil | Supercopa do Brasil | South America | | Other competitions | | Name(s) | Goals |
|---|---|---|---|---|---|---|---|---|---|---|---|---|---|---|---|---|---|
| 1971 | Série A | 4th | 25 | 12 | 7 | 6 | 33 | 21 | 31 | | | — | — | Campeonato Paulista | 3rd | | |
| 1972 | Série A | 4th | 29 | 12 | 12 | 5 | 31 | 26 | 36 | | | — | — | Campeonato Paulista | 4th | | |
| 1973 | Série A | 12th | 37 | 13 | 15 | 9 | 37 | 30 | 41 | | | — | — | Campeonato Paulista | 4th | | |
| 1974 | Série A | 15th | 24 | 8 | 10 | 6 | 29 | 21 | 26 | | | — | — | Campeonato Paulista | F | | |
| 1975 | Série A | 6th | 27 | 13 | 9 | 5 | 29 | 17 | 38 | | | — | — | Campeonato Paulista | 5th | | |
| 1976 | Série A | F | 23 | 13 | 6 | 4 | 31 | 17 | 38 | | | — | — | Campeonato Paulista | 11th | | |
| 1977 | Série A | 8th | 19 | 10 | 6 | 3 | 24 | 7 | 31 | | | Copa Libertadores | GS | Campeonato Paulista | C | | |
| 1978 | Série A | 12th | 26 | 12 | 9 | 5 | 29 | 16 | 36 | | | — | — | Campeonato Paulista | 3rd | | |
| 1979 | Série A | — | Withdrew | | | | | | | | | — | — | Campeonato Paulista | C | | |
| 1980 | Série A | 5th | 18 | 12 | 3 | 3 | 43 | 19 | 27 | | | — | — | Campeonato Paulista | 3rd | | |
| 1981 | Série A | 26th | 15 | 4 | 3 | 8 | 14 | 26 | 11 | | | — | — | Campeonato Paulista | 8th | | |
| 1982 | Série A | 4th | 12 | 6 | 2 | 4 | 19 | 15 | 14 | | | — | — | Campeonato Paulista | C | | |
| 1983 | Série A | 10th | 20 | 10 | 6 | 4 | 42 | 23 | 26 | | | — | — | Campeonato Paulista | C | | |
| 1984 | Série A | 4th | 24 | 9 | 10 | 5 | 31 | 19 | 28 | | | — | — | Campeonato Paulista | F | | |
| 1985 | Série A | 16th | 26 | 9 | 9 | 8 | 27 | 22 | 27 | | | — | — | Campeonato Paulista | 10th | | |
| 1986 | Série A | 7th | 30 | 13 | 12 | 5 | 42 | 20 | 38 | | | — | — | Campeonato Paulista | 5th | | |
| 1987 | Série A | 16th | 15 | 2 | 6 | 7 | 9 | 16 | 10 | | | — | — | Campeonato Paulista | F | | |
| 1988 | Série A | 15th | 23 | 6 | 9 | 8 | 21 | 22 | 32 | | | — | — | Campeonato Paulista | C | | |
| 1989 | Série A | 6th | 18 | 8 | 5 | 5 | 15 | 13 | 21 | QF | | — | — | Campeonato Paulista | 3rd | | |
| 1990 | Série A | C | 25 | 12 | 8 | 5 | 23 | 20 | 32 | — | — | — | — | Campeonato Paulista | 3rd | | |
| 1991 | Série A | 5th | 19 | 8 | 8 | 3 | 23 | 17 | 24 | QF | C | Copa Libertadores | R16 | Campeonato Paulista | F | | |
| 1992 | Série A | 6th | 25 | 10 | 7 | 8 | 32 | 39 | 27 | R16 | | — | — | Campeonato Paulista | 3rd | | |
| 1993 | Série A | 3rd | 20 | 12 | 7 | 1 | 38 | 18 | 31 | — | | — | — | Campeonato Paulista | F | | |
| 1993 | Série A | 3rd | 20 | 12 | 7 | 1 | 38 | 18 | 31 | — | | — | — | Torneio Rio–São Paulo | F | | |
| 1994 | Série A | F | 31 | 12 | 9 | 10 | 43 | 44 | 33 | R16 | | Copa CONMEBOL | SF | Campeonato Paulista | 3rd | | |
| 1995 | Série A | 14th | 23 | 9 | 4 | 10 | 32 | 33 | 31 | C | | Copa CONMEBOL | QF | Campeonato Paulista | C | | |
| 1996 | Série A | 12th | 23 | 7 | 11 | 5 | 20 | 19 | 32 | QF | | Copa Libertadores | QF | Campeonato Paulista | 4th | | |
| 1997 | Série A | 18th | 25 | 8 | 5 | 12 | 23 | 27 | 29 | SF | | — | — | Campeonato Paulista | C | | |
| 1997 | Série A | 18th | 25 | 8 | 5 | 12 | 23 | 27 | 29 | SF | | — | — | Torneio Rio–São Paulo | QF | | |
| 1998 | Série A | C | 32 | 18 | 7 | 7 | 57 | 38 | 61 | R16 | | Copa Mercosur | GS | Campeonato Paulista | F | | |
| 1998 | Série A | C | 32 | 18 | 7 | 7 | 57 | 38 | 61 | R16 | | Copa Mercosur | GS | Torneio Rio–São Paulo | GS | | |
| 1999 | Série A | C | 29 | 18 | 5 | 6 | 61 | 38 | 59 | R16 | | Copa Libertadores | QF | Campeonato Paulista | C | | |
| 1999 | Série A | C | 29 | 18 | 5 | 6 | 61 | 38 | 59 | R16 | | Copa Mercosur | QF | Torneio Rio–São Paulo | GS | | |
| 2000 | Série A | 28th | 24 | 4 | 4 | 16 | 26 | 46 | 16 | R16 | | Copa Libertadores | SF | Campeonato Paulista | SF | (Brazil) Luizão | 26 |
| 2000 | Série A | 28th | 24 | 4 | 4 | 16 | 26 | 46 | 16 | R16 | | Copa Mercosur | GS | Torneio Rio–São Paulo | GS | (Brazil) Luizão | 26 |
| 2000 | Série A | 28th | 24 | 4 | 4 | 16 | 26 | 46 | 16 | R16 | | — | — | FIFA Club World Championship | C | (Brazil) Luizão | 26 |
| 2001 | Série A | 18th | 27 | 9 | 7 | 11 | 46 | 45 | 34 | F | | Copa Mercosur | SF | Campeonato Paulista | C | | |
| 2001 | Série A | 18th | 27 | 9 | 7 | 11 | 46 | 45 | 34 | F | | Copa Mercosur | SF | Torneio Rio–São Paulo | GS | | |
| 2002 | Série A | F | 31 | 15 | 7 | 9 | 50 | 46 | 52 | C | | — | — | Torneio Rio–São Paulo | C | (Brazil) Deivid | 17 |
| 2003 | Série A | 15th | 46 | 15 | 12 | 19 | 61 | 63 | 59 | — | | Copa Libertadores | R16 | Campeonato Paulista | C | (Brazil) Liédson | 16 |
| 2003 | Série A | 15th | 46 | 15 | 12 | 19 | 61 | 63 | 59 | — | | Copa Sudamericana | 1R | Campeonato Paulista | C | (Brazil) Liédson | 16 |
| 2004 | Série A | 5th | 46 | 20 | 14 | 12 | 53 | 53 | 74 | QF | | — | — | Campeonato Paulista | GS | (Brazil) Jô | 8 |
| 2005 | Série A | 1st | 42 | 24 | 9 | 9 | 87 | 59 | 81 | R16 | | Copa Sudamericana | QF | Campeonato Paulista | 2nd | (Argentina) Carlos Tevez | 31 |
| 2006 | Série A | 9th | 38 | 15 | 8 | 15 | 41 | 46 | 53 | — | | Copa Libertadores | R16 | Campeonato Paulista | 6th | (Argentina) Carlos Tevez | 15 |
| 2006 | Série A | 9th | 38 | 15 | 8 | 15 | 41 | 46 | 53 | — | | Copa Sudamericana | R16 | Campeonato Paulista | 6th | (Argentina) Carlos Tevez | 15 |
| 2007 | Série A ↓ | 17th | 38 | 10 | 14 | 14 | 40 | 50 | 44 | R16 | | Copa Sudamericana | 1R | Campeonato Paulista | GS | (Brazil) Finazzi | 13 |
| 2008 | Série B ↑ | 1st | 38 | 25 | 10 | 3 | 79 | 29 | 85 | F | | — | — | Campeonato Paulista | GS | (Brazil) Dentinho | 24 |
| 2009 | Série A | 10th | 38 | 14 | 10 | 14 | 50 | 54 | 52 | C | | — | — | Campeonato Paulista | C | (Brazil) Ronaldo | 23 |
| 2010 | Série A | 3rd | 38 | 19 | 11 | 8 | 65 | 41 | 68 | — | | Copa Libertadores | R16 | Campeonato Paulista | GS | (Brazil) Bruno César | 14 |
| 2011 | Série A | 1st | 38 | 21 | 8 | 9 | 53 | 36 | 71 | — | | Copa Libertadores | 1R | Campeonato Paulista | F | (Portugal) Liédson | 23 |
| 2012 | Série A | 6th | 38 | 15 | 12 | 11 | 51 | 39 | 57 | — | | Copa Libertadores | C | Campeonato Paulista | QF | (Brazil) Paulinho | 16 |
| 2012 | Série A | 6th | 38 | 15 | 12 | 11 | 51 | 39 | 57 | — | | Copa Libertadores | C | FIFA Club World Cup | C | (Brazil) Paulinho | 16 |
| 2013 | Série A | 10th | 38 | 11 | 17 | 10 | 27 | 22 | 50 | QF | | Copa Libertadores | R16 | Campeonato Paulista | C | (Peru) Paolo Guerrero | 18 |
| 2013 | Série A | 10th | 38 | 11 | 17 | 10 | 27 | 22 | 50 | QF | | Copa Libertadores | R16 | Recopa Sudamericana | C | (Peru) Paolo Guerrero | 18 |
| 2014 | Série A | 4th | 38 | 19 | 12 | 7 | 49 | 31 | 69 | QF | | — | — | Campeonato Paulista | GS | (Peru) Paolo Guerrero | 16 |
| 2015 | Série A | 1st | 38 | 24 | 9 | 5 | 71 | 31 | 81 | R16 | | Copa Libertadores | R16 | Campeonato Paulista | SF | (Brazil) Jádson (Brazil) Vágner Love | 16 |
| 2016 | Série A | 7th | 38 | 15 | 10 | 13 | 48 | 42 | 55 | QF | | Copa Libertadores | R16 | Campeonato Paulista | SF | (Paraguay) Ángel Romero | 13 |
| 2017 | Série A | 1st | 38 | 21 | 9 | 8 | 50 | 30 | 72 | 4R | | Copa Sudamericana | R16 | Campeonato Paulista | C | (Brazil) Jô | 25 ♦ |
| 2018 | Série A | 13th | 38 | 11 | 11 | 16 | 34 | 35 | 44 | F | | Copa Libertadores | R16 | Campeonato Paulista | C | (Brazil) Jádson | 15 |
| 2019 | Série A | 8th | 38 | 14 | 14 | 10 | 42 | 34 | 56 | R16 | | Copa Sudamericana | SF | Campeonato Paulista | C | (Brazil) Gustavo | 14 |
| 2020 | Série A | 12th | 38 | 13 | 12 | 13 | 45 | 45 | 51 | R16 | — | Copa Libertadores | 2R | Campeonato Paulista | F | (Brazil) Jô | 8 |
| 2021 | Série A | 5th | 38 | 15 | 12 | 11 | 40 | 36 | 57 | 3R | — | Copa Sudamericana | GS | Campeonato Paulista | SF | (Brazil) Jô | 10 |
| 2022 | Série A | 4th | 38 | 18 | 11 | 9 | 44 | 36 | 65 | F | — | Copa Libertadores | QF | Campeonato Paulista | SF | (Brazil) Róger Guedes | 15 |
| 2023 | Série A | 13th | 38 | 12 | 14 | 12 | 47 | 48 | 50 | SF | — | Copa Libertadores | GS | Campeonato Paulista | QF | (Brazil) Róger Guedes | 21 |
| 2023 | Série A | 13th | 38 | 12 | 14 | 12 | 47 | 48 | 50 | SF | — | Copa Sudamericana | SF | Campeonato Paulista | QF | (Brazil) Róger Guedes | 21 |
| 2024 | Série A | 7th | 38 | 15 | 11 | 12 | 54 | 45 | 56 | SF | — | Copa Sudamericana | SF | Campeonato Paulista | GS | (Brazil) Yuri Alberto | 31 ♦ |
| 2025 | Série A | 13th | 38 | 12 | 11 | 15 | 42 | 47 | 47 | C | — | Copa Libertadores | 3R | Campeonato Paulista | C | (Brazil) Yuri Alberto | 19 |
| 2025 | Série A | 13th | 38 | 12 | 11 | 15 | 42 | 47 | 47 | C | — | Copa Sudamericana | GS | Campeonato Paulista | C | (Brazil) Yuri Alberto | 19 |
| 2026 | Série A | 9th | 23 | 8 | 8 | 7 | 25 | 22 | 32 | R16 | C | Copa Libertadores | QF | Campeonato Paulista | SF | (Brazil) Yuri Alberto | 8 |
