= Careca (disambiguation) =

Careca (born 1960) is a former Brazilian footballer who played as a striker.

Careca may also refer to:

People

- Antônio de Oliveira Filho (born 1960), Careca, Brazilian international football striker
- Rodrigo Vergilio (born 1983), Brazilian footballer who plays as a striker
- Hamilton de Souza (born 1968), "Careca II", former Brazilian international football striker
- Marcos Paulo Segobe da Silva (born 1980), Brazilian footballer who plays as a defensive midfielder
- Jesus Carlos da Silva (1943–2026), Brazilian footballer who played as a goalkeeper
- Leomir Silva Teles (born 1989), Brazilian footballer who plays as a striker
- Careca Bianchezi (born 1964), "Careca III", former Brazilian international footballer who played as a striker
- Mudather Careca (born 1988), Sudanese footballer who plays as a striker
- Márcio Careca (born 1978), Brazilian footballer who plays as a left-back
- Fernando Lopes Pereira (born 1989), Brazilian international futsal goalkeeper
- Careca (footballer, born 1995), Brazilian football attacking midfielder

Places

- Morro do Careca, Brazilian large dune located in the city of Natal, Rio Grande do Norte state

Others

- Careca, a Brazilian bread roll

== See also ==
- Carecas do ABC, Brazilian skinhead group based in the ABC region, in the Greater São Paulo
- Carequinha (1915–2006), Brazilian clown
