= Júlio César (footballer, born 1984) =

Brazilian footballer

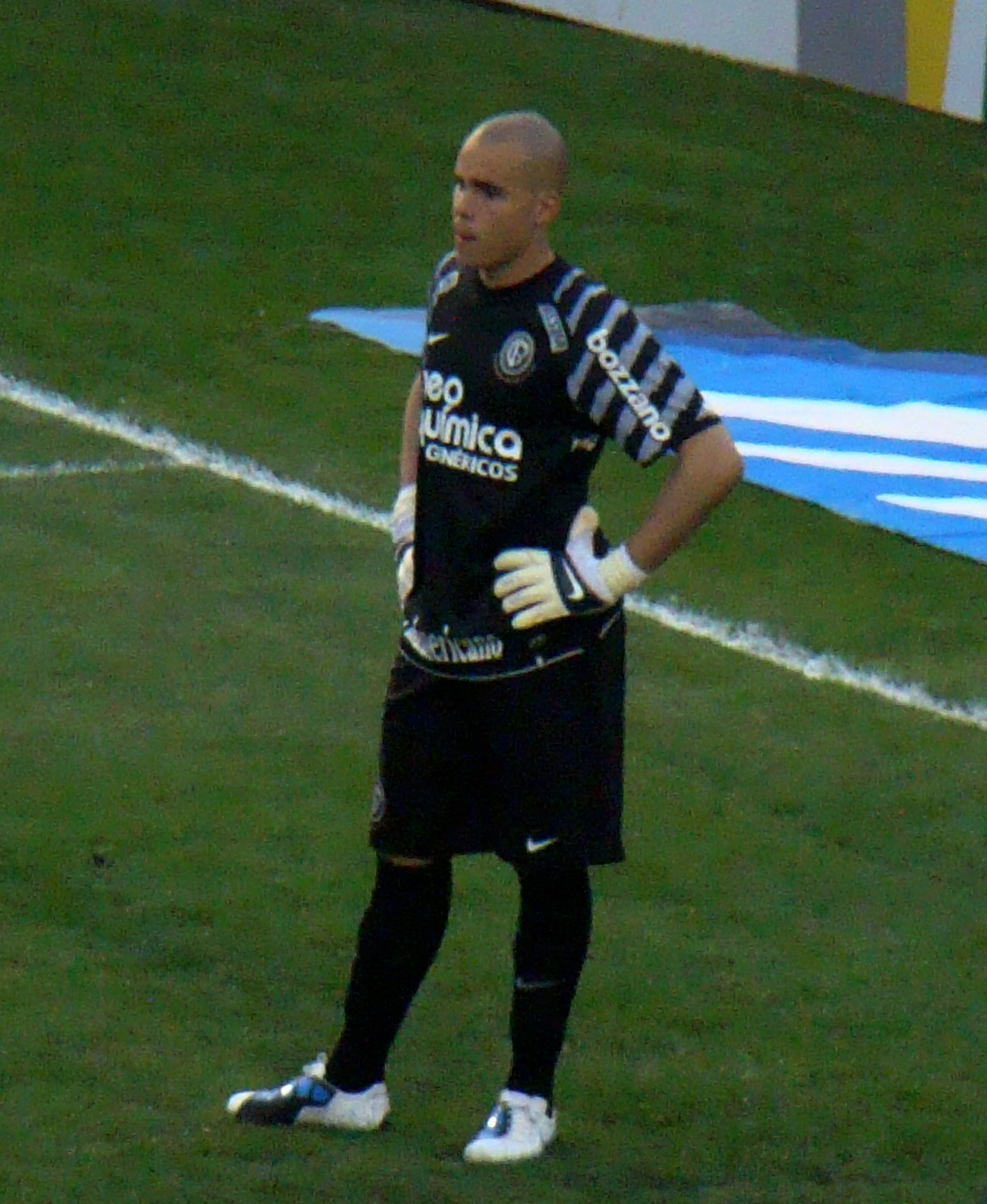
- César with Corinthians in 2010

Personal information
- Full name: Júlio César de Souza Santos
- Date of birth: 27 October 1984 (age 42)
- Place of birth: São Paulo, Brazil
- Height: 1.85 m (6 ft 1 in)
- Position: Goalkeeper

Youth career
- 2002–2004: Corinthians

Senior career*
Years	Team	Apps	(Gls)
2005–2014	Corinthians	121	(0)
2014	→ Náutico (loan)	24	(0)
2015–2016	Náutico	93	(0)
2017–2018	Santa Cruz	46	(0)
2018–2019	Red Bull Brasil	31	(0)
2019–2022	Red Bull Bragantino	64	(0)
Total		379	(0)
- * Club domestic league appearances and goals

Júlio César de Souza Santos or simply Júlio César (born 27 October 1984) is a Brazilian former footballer who played as a goalkeeper.

== Career ==
=== Early career ===
Born in São Paulo, Júlio César started playing football as a child on the streets of the Tucuruvi neighborhood. By the age of 9, he played with the children's teams at the local Clube de Campo Associação Atlética Guapira. After a friendly match against Corinthians in the age of 15, Júlio was invited by a scout to train at their youth team, with which he won the 2004 and 2005 editions of the Copa São Paulo de Futebol Júnior.

=== Professional career ===
After Corinthians' main goalkeeper, Fábio Costa was barred by the coach Daniel Passarella and his immediate reserve Tiago suffered 5 goals in a derby match against São Paulo FC, Júlio Cesar's chances began to rise. After another loss with Tiago on the squad and Daniel Passarella's firing, Júlio César made his debut in a match against Figueirense from Santa Catarina. Corinthians won by two goals to one, and Júlio César was sent to the bench again, as he was replaced with Marcelo Marinho, also from the youth team. That would be the only appearance from Júlio César in the 2005 season, which was won by Corinthians in controversial fashion.

The departure of Fábio Costa in 2006 caused a quick turnaround of goalkeepers in the team that would only end in 2008, such as Silvio Luiz, Johnny Herrera, and Bruno, who did not play for the team, Jean, who soon was barred from the main team, and Felipe. Júlio César only had a chance in 2008, after Marcelo's departure and Felipe's injury. Playing in matches for the Campeonato Paulista, Júlio earned a place as the main goalkeeper after Felipe failed in the Copa do Brasil, losing it yet again after Felipe rejoined the team, despite playing well. After Felipe's troubled departure from Corinthians, Júlio Cesar finally cemented his place as a main goalkeeper. Corinthians hired Paraguay national football team's Aldo Bobadilla for the goalkeeping position, who did not play for the team.

After poor showings in the 2011 Campeonato Paulista, Corinthians announced the arrival of a new goalkeeper, Renan from Avaí Futebol Clube. In a match against Botafogo, Júlio César suffered a compound fracture in his left pinky finger, but he soldiered on, as Corinthians had already made its 3 substitutions for the game. Renan, however, did not make good use of Júlio César's absence, playing poorly and losing his position to the third keeper, Danilo Fernandes, until Júlio was completely recovered and back to his goalkeeping duties.

On 12 October 2011, Júlio César played his 100th match for Corinthians, losing by 2 goals against Botafogo.

After overcoming harsh criticism from the fans, Júlio César finished 2011 as the absolute main goalkeeper for the team, helping Corinthians win the 2011 Campeonato Brasileiro.

In 2012, however, Júlio César's main team status was in danger. During the 2012 Campeonato Paulista, Júlio was criticized by his performances. The elimination against the Campinas squad AA Ponte Preta in the quarter finals, in which Júlio had committed "grotesque failings", suffering three goals against a weaker team caused manager Tite to replace him with the former goalkeeper of PSV Eindhoven, Cássio. Cássio did not disappoint, and was the main goalkeeper during Corinthians' unbeaten Libertadores campaign. Júlio was briefly linked with São Paulo squad Portuguesa, but the move did not materialize.

In July 2014 Júlio César left Corinthians for the first time, signing on loan for Náutico to get first team football. The transfer was made permanent at the end of the year, when his Corinthians contract expired.

At the end of 2016, after three seasons with Náutico, the player signed for Santa Cruz, in what was effectively a swap arrangement for Tiago Cardoso. After a year he signed with Red Bull Brasil and was part of the team that transitioned to Red Bull Bragantino following the merger with Clube Atlético Bragantino.

In 2023, at the age of 38, Júlio César retired from professional football. He subsequently joined the club's coaching staff as an assistant manager, before being promoted to the role of technical coordinator.

In April 2026, Júlio César stepped down as technical coordinator and announced his departure from Red Bull Bragantino. He had initially joined the club's backroom staff as an assistant manager before being promoted to the coordinator role.

Later in April 2026, only weeks after leaving Red Bull Bragantino, Júlio was appointed technical coordinator of Corinthians, replacing Renan Bloise. The move represented a return to the club where, as a goalkeeper, he had built much of his playing career and lifted several major trophies.

== Honours ==
=== Club ===
Corinthians

- Campeonato Brasileiro Série A: 2005, 2011
- Campeonato Brasileiro Série B: 2008
- Campeonato Paulista: 2009, 2013
- Copa do Brasil: 2009
- Copa Libertadores: 2012
- FIFA Club World Cup: 2012
- Recopa Sudamericana: 2013

Red Bull Bragantino

- Campeonato Brasileiro Série B: 2019

Corinthians U20

- Copa São Paulo de Futebol Júnior: 2004, 2005

== Personal life ==
Júlio César is an Evangelical, converting in 2005.

== Career statistics ==
=== Club ===
As of 12 May 2026

Appearances and goals by club, season and competition
Club	Season	League			State League		Cup		Continental		Other		Total	
Club	Season	Division	Apps	Goals	Apps	Goals	Apps	Goals	Apps	Goals	Apps	Goals	Apps	Goals
Corinthians	2005	Série A	1	0	0	0	0	0	0	0	—		1	0
Corinthians	2008	Série B	4	0	2	0	0	0	—		—		2	0
Corinthians	2009	Série A	4	0	0	0	0	0	—		—		4	0
Corinthians	2010	Série A	31	0	1	0	—		3 (Note: Appearance(s) in Copa Libertadores)	0	—		35	0
Corinthians	2011	Série A	33	0	22	0	—		2	0	—		57	0
Corinthians	2012	Série A	4	0	15	0	—		6	0	0	0	25	0
Corinthians	2013	Série A	0	0	4	0	0	0	1	0	0	0	5	0
Corinthians	Total		77	0	44	0	0	0	12	0	0	0	133	0
Náutico	2014	Série B	24	0	—		—		—		—		24	0
Náutico	2015	Série B	36	0	10	0	5	0	—		6 (Note: Appearance(s) in Copa do Nordeste)	0	57	0
Náutico	2016	Série B	35	0	12	0	2	0	—		—		49	0
Náutico	Total		95	0	22	0	7	0	—		6	0	130	0
Santa Cruz	2017	Série B	35	0	11	0	2	0	—		9	0	57	0
Red Bull Brasil	2018	Paulista	—		15	0	—		—		18 (Note: Appearance(s) in Copa Paulista)	0	33	0
Red Bull Brasil	2019	Paulista	—		16	0	—		—		—		16	0
Red Bull Brasil	Total		—		31	0	—		—		18	0	49	0
Bragantino	2019	Série B	36	0	—		—		—		—		36	0
Bragantino	2020	Série A	6	0	13	0	0	0	—		—		19	0
Bragantino	2021	Série A	4	0	5	0	4	0	0	0	—		13	0
Bragantino	Total		46	0	18	0	4	0	0	0	—		66	0
Career Total			253	0	126	0	13	0	12	0	33	0	437	0
