= Barbosinha =

Brazilian futsal player

Personal information
- Full name: Roberto Soares Barbosa
- Date of birth: 30 March 1988 (age 38)
- Place of birth: Cacique Doble, Brazil
- Height: 1.70 m (5 ft 7 in)
- Position: Pivot

Team information
- Current team: Atlântico
- Number: 12

Youth career
- 2001–2005: Sananduva
- 2007–2008: Atlântico

Senior career*
Years	Team	Apps	(Gls)
2009–2012	Chapecoense		
2012	Chapecoense (football)		
2013	Xaxiense		
2014	Marreco		
2015–2016	Copagril		
2017	Marreco	19	(5)
2018–2019	Copagril	28	(10)
2019–	Atlântico		

International career^{‡}
2016–	Brazil		
- * Club domestic league appearances and goals as of 00:00, 22 May 2019 (UTC) ‡ National team caps and goals as of 00:00, 22 May 2019 (UTC)

Roberto Soares Barbosa (born 30 March 1988), better known as Barbosinha, is a Brazilian futsal player who plays as a pivot for Atlântico and the Brazil national futsal team.

Moves to the Belarusian club "Stalitsa"
