= Dentinho =

Brazilian footballer (born 1989)

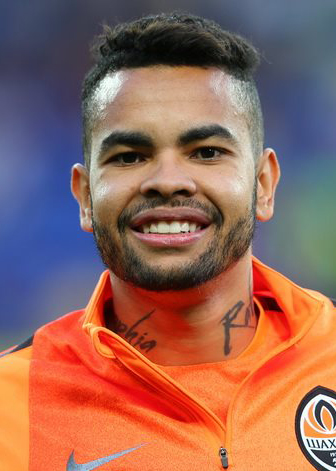
- Dentinho playing for Shakhtar Donetsk in 2015

Personal information
- Full name: Bruno Ferreira Bonfim
- Date of birth: 19 January 1989 (age 37)
- Place of birth: São Paulo, Brazil
- Height: 1.76 m (5 ft 9 in)
- Position: Forward

Youth career
- 2005–2007: Corinthians

Senior career*
Years	Team	Apps	(Gls)
2007–2011	Corinthians	153	(44)
2011–2022	Shakhtar Donetsk	138	(23)
2013	→ Beşiktaş (loan)	8	(0)
2022	Ceará	6	(0)
2024	Amazonas	5	(0)
2025	Brasiliense	1	(0)

International career
2009	Brazil U20	6	(1)
- * Club domestic league appearances and goals as of 20 October 2022

Bruno Ferreira Bonfim (born 19 January 1989) is a Brazilian professional footballer who plays for Amazonas as a forward. His nickname Dentinho means “little tooth” in Portuguese.

He began his career at Corinthians in 2007, and won three titles with the club, the 2009 Copa do Brasil, 2009 Campeonato Paulista, and the 2008 Campeonato Brasileiro Série B. He stayed at the club for four years until moving to Ukraine in 2011 to play for Shakhtar Donetsk, with which he won a domestic treble in 2012: the Ukrainian Premier League, Ukrainian Cup, and Ukrainian Super Cup. He was briefly loaned out to Turkish club Beşiktaş in 2013.

Dentinho has been capped at the youth international levels with the Brazil under-20 team, making six appearances and scoring 1 goal. He was part of the squad that won the 2009 South American U-20 Championship.

== Career ==
=== Corinthians ===
==== 2007 ====
After being presented from the youth team as a promising youngster, he made his first appearance for Corinthians in the Campeonato Brasileiro Série A during the derby game against Palmeiras, and scored his first goal in a draw against Fluminense on 7 July 2007.

==== 2008 ====
He was Corinthians's top scorer during the Campeonato Paulista 2008. He also was the team's top scorer alongside Germán Herrera with 14 goals during the Campeonato Brasileiro Série B 2008, which the club won.

==== 2009 ====
Dentinho led Corinthians to the league and cup title alongside new Corinthians signing Ronaldo during the 2009 Campeonato Paulista and the 2009 Copa do Brasil. He scored in the cup semifinal on 27 May 2009 in a 1–1 draw against Vasco da Gama to help Corinthians pass to the final and beat Internacional. On 30 September 2009, Dentinho signed an agreement with Corinthians in order to extend his contract until December 2013. He also received a salary increase, with a release clause of over 30 million euros.

==== 2010 ====
Dentinho scored his first ever goal in Copa Libertadores for Corinthians on 10 March 2010, a strike from just outside the area to draw level in a group fixture away to Colombian club Independiente Medellín.

=== Shakhtar Donetsk ===
On 18 May 2011, Dentinho signed a five-year contract with Ukrainian club Shakhtar Donetsk. The deal between Corinthians and Shakhtar was reported to be €7.5 million. It saw Dentinho join a team with several Brazilian players already amongst their ranks, including former Corinthians teammate Willian and fellow Brazilian U20 player Douglas Costa.

On 10 July, he came on as a 58th minute substitution for Alex Teixeira, scoring just five minutes into his debut, in a 4–0 win against Obolon Kyiv. He managed three goals in 18 league appearances in his first season with Shakhtar. The club clinched the title for the 2011–12 Premier League season as well as the Ukrainian Cup. Dentinho was an unused substitute for the 2–0 2012 Super Cup victory over Metalurh Donetsk. He scored a goal in his first start of the 2012–13 season in a 3–0 victory over Karpaty Lviv.

In May 2019, Dentinho scored his first hat-trick for Shakhtar in a 4–0 league victory against FC Mariupol.

On 1 December 2020, Dentinho scored in a 2–0 UEFA Champions League group stage victory against Real Madrid.

On 8 November 2021, his contract with Shakhtar expired after ten years at the club.

==== Beşiktaş JK (loan) ====
On 23 January 2013, Dentinho was loaned out to Süper Lig club Besiktas until January 2014. On the last day of 2013 his loan deal expired and therefore he returned to Shakhtar.

=== Ceará ===
On 2 March 2022, Ceará announced the signing of Dentinho on a contract until the end of 2022.

== Personal life ==
In 2012, Dentinho converted to Buddhism and married model Danielle Souza in a buddhist wedding. They have three children: son Bruno Lucas (born 2012) and identical twins Sophia and Rafaella (born 2014).

== Career statistics ==
As of 3 December 2022

Appearances and goals by club, season and competition
Club	Season	League			State league (Note: Includes Campeonato Paulista, Campeonato Cearense)		National cup (Note: Includes Copa do Brasil, Ukrainian Cup)		Continental		Other		Total	
Club	Season	Division	Apps	Goals	Apps	Goals	Apps	Goals	Apps	Goals	Apps	Goals	Apps	Goals
Corinthians	2007	Série A	19	1	0	0	0	0	1	1	0	0	20	2
Corinthians	2008	Série B	28	14	18	6	11	4	–		–		57	24
Corinthians	2009	Série A	29	9	12	2	8	3	–		–		49	14
Corinthians	2010	Série A	17	2	14	6	0	0	8 (Note: Appearances in Copa Libertadores)	2	–		39	10
Corinthians	2011	Série A	0	0	16	4	0	0	2	0	–		18	4
Corinthians	Total		93	26	60	18	19	7	11	3	0	0	183	54
Shakhtar Donetsk	2011–12	Ukrainian Premier League	18	3	–		2	0	0	0	0	0	20	3
Shakhtar Donetsk	2012–13	Ukrainian Premier League	4	1	–		1	0	0	0	0	0	5	1
Shakhtar Donetsk	2013–14	Ukrainian Premier League	1	0	–		1	0	0	0	0	0	2	0
Shakhtar Donetsk	2014–15	Ukrainian Premier League	11	1	–		5	1	0	0	0	0	16	2
Shakhtar Donetsk	2015–16	Ukrainian Premier League	14	2	–		5	0	8 (Note: Three appearances and one goal in UEFA Champions League, five appearances in UEFA Europa League)	1	1 (Note: Appearance in Ukrainian Super Cup)	0	28	3
Shakhtar Donetsk	2016–17	Ukrainian Premier League	23	5	–		2	0	8 (Note: Two appearances in UEFA Champions League, six appearances and one goal in UEFA Europa League)	1	0	0	33	6
Shakhtar Donetsk	2017–18	Ukrainian Premier League	25	1	–		3	0	5 (Note: Appearances in UEFA Champions League)	0	1	0	34	1
Shakhtar Donetsk	2018–19	Ukrainian Premier League	12	4	–		2	1	2	0	0	0	16	5
Shakhtar Donetsk	2019–20	Ukrainian Premier League	11	2	–		1	0	2	0	1	0	15	2
Shakhtar Donetsk	2020–21	Ukrainian Premier League	14	3	–		1	0	6 (Note: Four appearances and one goal in UEFA Champions League, two appearances in UEFA Europa League)	1	0	0	21	4
Shakhtar Donetsk	2021–22	Ukrainian Premier League	4	1	–		1	1	2	0	0	0	7	2
Shakhtar Donetsk	Total		137	23	0	0	24	3	33	3	3	0	197	29
Beşiktaş (loan)	2012–13	Süper Lig	6	0	–		0	0	–		–		6	0
Beşiktaş (loan)	2013–14	Süper Lig	2	0	–		0	0	1 (Note: Appearance in UEFA Europa League)	0	–		3	0
Beşiktaş (loan)	Total		8	0	0	0	0	0	1	0	0	0	9	0
Ceará	2022	Série A	5	0	1	0	1	0	2 (Note: Appearances in Copa Sudamericana)	0	–		9	0
Career total			243	49	61	18	44	10	47	6	3	0	398	83

== Honours ==
Corinthians

- Copa do Brasil: 2009
- Campeonato Paulista: 2009
- Campeonato Brasileiro Série B: 2008

Shakhtar Donetsk

- Ukrainian Premier League: 2011–12, 2013–14, 2016–17, 2017–18, 2018–19
- Ukrainian Cup: 2011–12, 2015–16, 2016–17, 2017–18, 2018–19
- Ukrainian Super Cup: 2012, 2014, 2015, 2017

Brazil U20

- South American Youth Championship: 2009

Individual

- Breakthrough of the Campeonato Paulista: 2008
