= William Machado =

Brazilian footballer (born 1976)

Personal information
- Full name: William Machado de Oliveira
- Date of birth: 24 August 1976 (age 50)
- Place of birth: Belo Horizonte, Brazil
- Height: 1.89 m (6 ft 2 in)
- Position: Centre back

Youth career
- América Mineiro

Senior career*
Years	Team	Apps	(Gls)
1997–1998	Sete de Setembro-MG		
1999	Desportiva Capixaba		
1999–2000	Ipatinga		
2001	Cabofriense		
2002	América Mineiro		
2003	Francana		
2003	Portuguesa		
2004–2005	Joinville		
2005–2006	Ipatinga		
2006–2007	Grêmio	62	(3)
2008–2010	Corinthians	83	(2)

International career
1993	Brazil U17		
- * Club domestic league appearances and goals

William Machado de Oliveira (born 24 August 1976), commonly known as William Machado or simply William, is a Brazilian former footballer who played as a central defender.

== Playing career ==
=== Early career ===
Born in Belo Horizonte, Minas Gerais, William started his career with hometown amateurs Sete de Setembro. After a short spell with Desportiva Capixaba, he signed for Ipatinga in 1999, and was a regular starter for the club until joining Cabofriense in 2001.

In 2002, William returned to his native state after agreeing to a contract with América Mineiro, a club he already represented as a youth. He failed to settle into any team in the following campaigns, representing Francana, Portuguesa and Joinville before suffering a serious injury in 2004.

In 2005 William returned to Ipatinga, and subsequently became an undisputed starter for the side.

=== Grêmio ===
On 1 April 2006, William was presented at Grêmio.

=== Corinthians ===
In 2007, after the arrival of Mano Menezes to Corinthians and the demand of time for players to form their defensive sector, William, who had worked and had credibility with Mano Menezes ended up being requested by the coach and hired by Corinthians. He was hired for a period of 6 months with possibility of extension, which was later made. With the departure of Betão to Santos, William was chosen as team captain. With the Timão he was runner-up on the Brazil Cup in 2008. On November 8, 2008, he won the Campeonato Brasileiro Série B with Corinthians. In 2009 they won the Campeonato Paulista (undefeated), and the Copa do Brasil. In 2010, the captain led a campaign in conjunction with the then sponsor of the club, to help the people who suffered from the earthquake in Haiti.

== Honours ==
Ipatinga

- Campeonato Mineiro: 2005

Grêmio

- Campeonato Gaúcho: 2006, 2007

Corinthians

- Campeonato Brasileiro Série B: 2008
- Campeonato Paulista: 2009
- Copa do Brasil: 2009
