= Diego Sacoman =

Brazilian footballer (born 1986)

Personal information
- Full name: Diego Alessandro Aparecido Sacoman Silva
- Date of birth: 15 December 1986 (age 39)
- Place of birth: Guarulhos, Brazil
- Height: 1.84 m (6 ft 1/2 in)
- Position: Centre back

Youth career
- 1993–2007: Corinthians

Senior career*
Years	Team	Apps	(Gls)
2007–2012	Corinthians	20	(0)
2008	→ Guarani (loan)	0	(0)
2010	→ Ceará (loan)	19	(1)
2011	→ Ceará (loan)	12	(0)
2012	→ Ponte Preta (loan)	0	(0)
2012–2014	Ponte Preta	56	(1)
2015	Santa Cruz	14	(0)
2016	Red Bull Brasil	13	(0)
2016	Bragantino	9	(0)
2017	Novorizontino	6	(0)
2019–2020	Juventus-SP	33	(1)
2020–2021	Portuguesa	0	(0)
2022	São Bento	14	(2)
2022	Ferroviária	4	(0)
2023	Capital	0	(0)
2023	Juventus-SP	15	(0)
- * Club domestic league appearances and goals ‡ National team caps and goals as of 19 September 2015

Diego Alessandro Aparecido Sacoman Silva (born 15 December 1986), known as Diego Sacoman, is a Brazilian footballer who plays for Bragantino. Mainly as a central defender, he can also play as a left back.

== Club career ==
Born in Guarulhos, São Paulo, Sacoman joined Corinthians' youth setup in 1993, aged six. In 2008, shortly after being promoted to the main squad, he was loaned to Guarani until the end of the year.

Sacoman appeared rarely with the side, mainly due to injury. He returned to Timão in 2009, making his first team debut on 21 February of that year by starting in a 3–1 Campeonato Paulista away win against Guaratinguetá.

Sacoman made his Série A debut on 6 June 2009, playing the full 90 minutes in a 2–0 home win against Coritiba. He appeared in 20 matches during the season, as his side finished 10th.

On 11 January 2010, Sacoman was loaned to Ceará until December. On 16 May 2011, after being rarely used at Corinthians, he returned to Vozão for a second spell, also in a temporary deal.

On 24 January 2012 Sacoman joined Ponte Preta, on loan until 30 April. On 4 May, after his contract with Corinthians expired, he signed permanently with Ponte until the end of 2014.

On 23 September 2014, after failing a medical at Atlético Paranaense, Sacoman had to retire after having a hypertrophic cardiomyopathy. On 2 February of the following year, however, he returned to action after agreeing to a contract with Santa Cruz.

== Career statistics ==
As of 19 September 2015

Club	Season	League			State League		Cup		Continental		Other		Total	
Club	Season	Division	Apps	Goals	Apps	Goals	Apps	Goals	Apps	Goals	Apps	Goals	Apps	Goals
Guarani	2008	Série C	0	0	5	0	1	0	—		—		6	0
Corinthians	2009	Série A	20	0	8	0	7	0	—		—		35	0
Corinthians	2011	Série A	0	0	1	0	0	0	—		—		1	0
Corinthians	Subtotal		20	0	9	0	7	0	0	0	0	0	36	0
Ceará	2010	Série A	19	1	8	0	0	0	—		—		27	1
Ceará	2011	Série A	12	0	—		—		1 (Note: Appearance(s) in Copa Sudamericana)	0	—		13	0
Ceará	Subtotal		31	1	8	0	0	0	1	0	0	0	40	1
Ponte Preta	2012	Série A	19	0	9	1	2	0	—		—		30	1
Ponte Preta	2013	Série A	28	1	8	0	3	0	10	0	—		49	1
Ponte Preta	2014	Série B	9	0	15	0	2	0	—		—		26	0
Ponte Preta	Subtotal		56	1	32	1	7	0	10	0	0	0	105	2
Santa Cruz	2015	Série B	14	0	4	0	0	0	—		—		18	0
Career total			121	2	71	1	14	0	11	0	0	0	217	3

== Honours ==
Corinthians

- Campeonato Brasileiro Série B: 2008
- Campeonato Paulista: 2009
- Copa do Brasil: 2009

Santa Cruz

- Campeonato Pernambucano: 2015

Portuguesa

- Copa Paulista: 2020
