= Lulinha =

Brazilian footballer (born 1990)

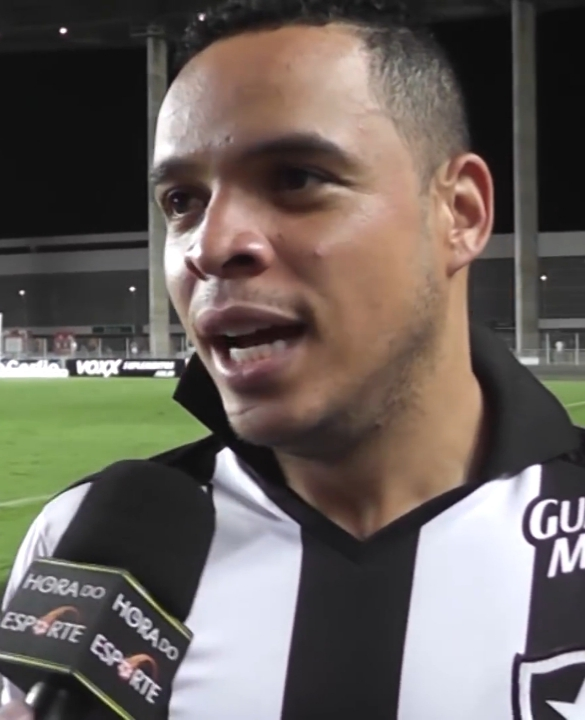
- Lulinha in 2015, for Botafogo

Personal information
- Full name: Luiz Marcelo Morais dos Reis
- Date of birth: 10 April 1990 (age 36)
- Place of birth: Mauá, Brazil
- Height: 1.70 m (5 ft 7 in)
- Positions: Winger; attacking midfielder

Team information
- Current team: Madura United
- Number: 11

Youth career
- 1998–2006: Corinthians

Senior career*
Years	Team	Apps	(Gls)
2007–2013	Corinthians	85	(4)
2009–2010	→ Estoril Praia (loan)	26	(2)
2010–2011	→ Olhanense (loan)	13	(0)
2011–2012	→ Bahia (loan)	67	(9)
2013–2014	Ceará	45	(18)
2014	Criciúma	15	(2)
2014–2015	Ceará	20	(2)
2015	→ Red Bull Bragantino II (loan)	14	(4)
2015	Botafogo	21	(3)
2016	Mogi Mirim	12	(2)
2016–2017	Pohang Steelers	51	(19)
2018	Sharjah	11	(1)
2018–2019	Pafos	25	(1)
2020–2021	Júbilo Iwata	26	(5)
2021	Montedio Yamagata	10	(0)
2022–2023	Madura United	48	(17)
2024–	Madura United	58	(19)

International career
2005–2007	Brazil U17	16	(16)
- * Club domestic league appearances and goals as of 6 September 2026

Luiz Marcelo Morais dos Reis (born 10 April 1990), commonly known as Lulinha, is a Brazilian professional footballer who plays as a winger or attacking midfielder for Super League club Madura United.

== Club career ==
Lulinha was born in Mauá, a Brazilian municipality in the São Paulo (state). He started as a futsal player before joining the Corinthians youth system at the age of 8. A prolific attacking midfielder, he helped the Brazilian U-17 national side to win the 2007 U-17 South-American Championship, scoring 12 goals in 7 matches. In 2007, he played in the Pan American Games and scored 3 goals in 3 games.

There was much speculation involving Lulinha's future, but at the end of 2007 he signed a new contract with his club Corinthians, committing himself to the club until 2012. Corinthian President Andres Sanchez added "To take him off Corinthians, the interested club would have to pay 35 million Euros (£24 million), and the player has 25 percent of his rights". After eleven years with Corinthians, on 23 July 2009 he joined Estoril Praia on loan for one year. On 9 August 2010, he joined Olhanense, on loan from Corinthians. Lulinha was loaned to Bahia until 1 July 2012.

On 28 April 2015, Lulinha joined Botafogo.

== International career ==
From 2007 until 2008, Lulinha was a member of the Brazil U-17 national squad. He has represented Brazil U-17s 10 times, scoring 16 goals. He played for Brazil at the 2007 Under-17 World Cup.

== Honours ==
=== Club ===
Corinthians

- Campeonato Brasileiro Série B: 2008
- Campeonato Paulista: 2009
- Copa do Brasil: 2009

Bahia

- Campeonato Baiano: 2012

Ceará

- Campeonato Cearense: 2013

Botafogo

- Campeonato Brasileiro Série B: 2015

=== Brazil U17 ===
- South American Under 17 Football Championship: 2007

Individual

- Liga 1/Super League Player of the Month: September 2024, December 2025
- Top Goalscorer of the 2007 South American U-17 Football Championship
