= Chicão (footballer, born 1981) =

Brazilian footballer

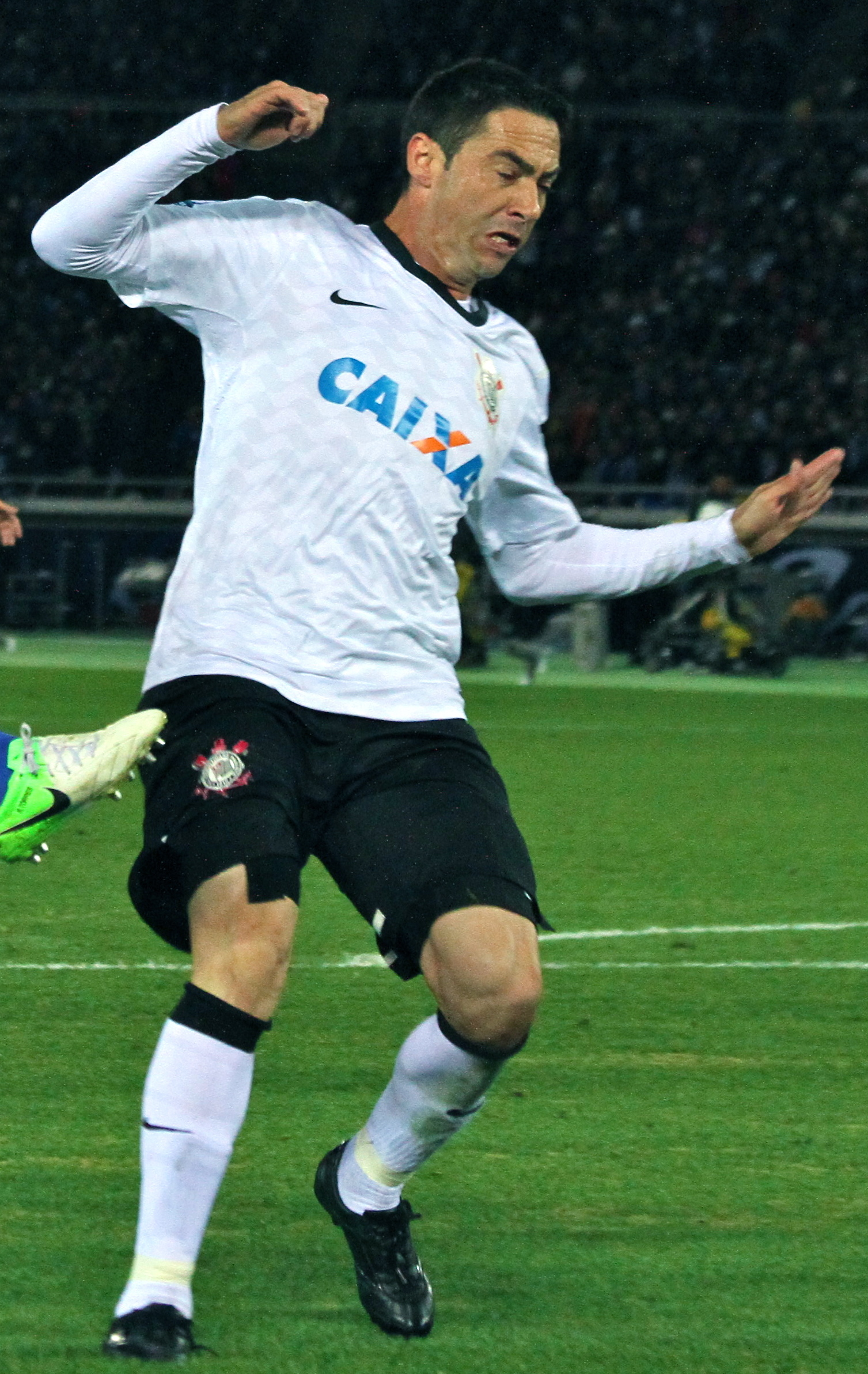
- Chicão with Corinthians at the 2012 FIFA Club World Cup

Personal information
- Full name: Anderson Sebastião Cardoso
- Date of birth: June 3, 1981 (age 45)
- Place of birth: Mogi Guaçu, Brazil
- Height: 1.79 m (5 ft 10 in)
- Position: Centre-back

Youth career
- 1998–2002: Mogi Mirim

Senior career*
Years	Team	Apps	(Gls)
2003–2004	Mogi Mirim	0	(0)
2004	Portuguesa Santista	0	(0)
2005	América-SP	0	(0)
2005	Juventude	14	(0)
2006–2007	Figueirense	54	(11)
2008–2013	Corinthians	117	(22)
2013–2014	Flamengo	32	(1)
2015	Bahia	0	(0)
2015	Delhi Dynamos	12	(1)
Total		229	(35)
- * Club domestic league appearances and goals

Anderson Sebastião Cardoso or simply Chicão (born June 3, 1981), is a Brazilian former professional professional footballer who has played as a centre-back for Corinthians, Flamengo and Delhi Dynamos.

== Career ==
On August 3, 2013, Chicão joined Flamengo after leaving Corinthians

On 21 August 2015, he signed for Indian Super League franchise Delhi Dynamos.

On 14 July 2016, Chicão announced his retirement from football.

== Career statistics ==
As of match played on 23 April 2015

Appearances and goals by club, season and competition
Club	Season	League			National cup		State League		International		Total	
Club	Season	Division	Apps	Goals	Apps	Goals	Apps	Goals	Apps	Goals	Apps	Goals
Juventude	2005	Série A	22	0							22	0
Figueirense	2006	Série A	28	1							28	1
Figueirense	2007	Série A	26	10							26	10
Figueirense	Total		54	11							54	11
Corinthians	2008	Série B										
Corinthians	2009	Série A	25	4	8	1	18	8	—		51	13
Corinthians	2010	Série A	25	1	0	0	11	2	8 (Note: Appearances in Copa Libertadores)	1	44	4
Corinthians	2011	Série A	22	4	0	0	16	1	2	0	40	5
Corinthians	2012	Série A	20	3	0	0	11	2	16 (Note: Appearances in Copa Libertadores and FIFA Club World Cup)	0	47	5
Corinthians	2013	Série A	4	0	0	0	5	0	1	0	10	0
Corinthians	Total		96	12	8	1	61	13	27	1	165	27
Flamengo	2013	Série A	14	1	6	1	0	0	0	0	20	2
Flamengo	2014	Série A	18	0	4	1	5	0	1	0	28	1
Flamengo	Total		32	1	10	2	5	0	1	0	48	3
Bahia	2015	Série A	0	0	1	0	7	0	—		8	0
Delhi Dynamos	2015	Indian Super League	0	0	—		—		—		0	0
Career total			204	24	19	3	73	13	28	1	324	41

== Honours ==
Figueirense

- Campeonato Catarinense: 2006

Corinthians

- Campeonato Brasileiro Série B: 2008
- Campeonato Paulista: 2009, 2013
- Copa do Brasil: 2009
- Campeonato Brasileiro Série A: 2011
- Copa Libertadores: 2012
- FIFA Club World Cup: 2012
- Recopa Sudamericana: 2013

Flamengo

- Copa do Brasil: 2013
- Campeonato Carioca: 2014
