= Morais (footballer, born 1984) =

Brazilian footballer

Personal information
- Full name: Manoel Morais Amorim
- Date of birth: July 17, 1984 (age 42)
- Place of birth: Maceió, Brazil
- Height: 1.69 m (5 ft 7 in)
- Position: Attacking midfielder

Youth career
- –1998: CRB
- 1998–2002: Vasco da Gama

Senior career*
Years	Team	Apps	(Gls)
2002–2009	Vasco da Gama	128	(23)
2004–2005	→ Atlético Paranaense (loan)	18	(1)
2008–2009	→ Corinthians (loan)	29	(3)
2009–2012	Corinthians	43	(1)
2010	→ Bahia (loan)	28	(4)
2012	→ Bahia (loan)	19	(0)
2013	Atlético Mineiro	3	(0)
2013	Criciúma	18	(0)
2014	América-RN	8	(0)
2015	CRB	5	(1)
2016–2017	São Bento	22	(2)
2017	Botafogo SP	14	(1)
2018–2019	Brasiliense	15	(2)
2020	Confiança	0	(0)
2022	Murici	7	(0)
2022	ASA	0	(0)
2023–2024	Murici	11	(0)

International career
2006	Brazil	0	(0)
- * Club domestic league appearances and goals

Manoel Morais Amorim (born July 17, 1984) is a Brazilian former professional footballer who played as an attacking midfielder.

== Career ==
On 6 June 2016, Morais signed for Indian Super League team NorthEast United, but was released by NorthEast United on 30 August 2016 before playing a competitive match for the club.

He was called up for the Brazil national team by coach Dunga in August 2006 for an away friendly against Norway (1–1 scoreline), but did not enter the match. In 2007 he was placed in the preliminary squad for the year's Copa América, hosted by Venezuela, but in the end was left out of the final list for the competition due to an injury.

== Honours ==
Vasco da Gama

- Rio de Janeiro State League: 2003

Atlético Paranaense

- Paraná State League: 2005

Corinthians

- Brazilian Championship Serie B: 2008
- São Paulo State League: 2009
- Brazilian Cup: 2009

Bahia

- Campeonato Baiano: 2012

Atlético Mineiro

- Campeonato Mineiro: 2013
