= Felipe (footballer, born February 1984) =

Brazilian footballer

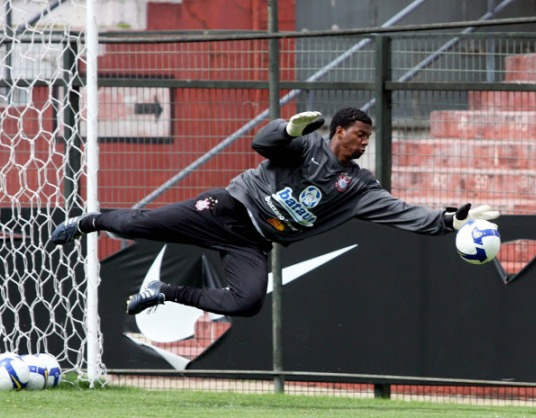

Personal information
- Full name: Luiz Felipe Ventura dos Santos
- Date of birth: 22 February 1984 (age 42)
- Place of birth: Rio de Janeiro, Brazil
- Height: 1.90 m (6 ft 3 in)
- Position: Goalkeeper

Team information
- Current team: Differdange 03
- Number: 84

Youth career
- 1999–2003: Vitória

Senior career*
Years	Team	Apps	(Gls)
2003–2005	Vitória	20	(0)
2005	São Caetano	0	(0)
2006–2007	Bragantino	0	(0)
2006	→ Portuguesa (loan)	16	(0)
2007–2010	Corinthians	108	(0)
2010–2011	Olé Brasil	0	(0)
2010	→ Sporting Braga (loan)	12	(0)
2011–2014	Flamengo	150	(0)
2015–2016	Figueirense	2	(0)
2016–2017	Bragantino	46	(0)
2018	Uberlândia	6	(0)
2018–2020	Kisvárda	44	(0)
2020–2022	Botafogo-PB	25	(0)
2022-2023	Paraná Clube	16	(0)
2023	→ Capital-DF	0	(0)
2023	Santa Rosa-PA	0	(0)
2024	Sampaio Corrêa	9	(0)
2024–	Differdange 03	57	(0)

International career
1999	Brazil U-15		
2000	Brazil U-16		
2001	Brazil U-17	7	(0)
2002	Brazil U-18		
- * Club domestic league appearances and goals as of 13 June 2026

Luiz Felipe Ventura dos Santos (born 22 February 1984 in Rio de Janeiro), known as Felipe, is a Brazilian footballer who plays as a goalkeeper for Differdange 03.

== Career ==
=== Early career ===
Felipe began his career in Vitória (BA) before being signed by São Caetano in September 2005 until end of year. He was the first choice keeper for Vitória in 2005 Campeonato Brasileiro Série B, played 15 out of 21 games.

In 2006, he signed for Bragantino. In April 2006, he left for Campeonato Brasileiro Série B side Portuguesa, competed the start-up place with Tiago Campagnaro. In 2007 season he finished as the losing finalists in 2007 Campeonato Paulista with Bragantino.

On 24 April 2007, he was signed for Corinthians along with four of his teammates: Kadu, Moradei, Everton Leandro and Zelão.

=== Corinthians ===
He made his league debut for Corinthians, on 13 May 2007, in a win 1–0 against Juventude, and immediately established himself as Corinthian's starting goalkeeper. Felipe wore the number 1 shirt at the club.

In 2008, Corinthians only owned 50% economic rights of Felipe, and his former club Bragantino owned 25% and the rest was owned by "Mamabru Participações".

=== Braga ===
In summer 2010, Genoa and Corinthians formed a deal to sign Felipe, as Genoa has loaned their first choice keeper Marco Amelia to A.C. Milan, and the Brazilian side signed Aldo Bobadilla as replacement. But the deal was not yet completed due to FIGC decided to reduce the numbers of registration quota of non-EU players signed from abroad, from 2 to 1 on 2 July. It was reported that Genoa kept the quota for future signing instead for Felipe. Genoa eventually signed Rafinha and Felipe terminated his contract with Corinthians on 5 August 2010. On 9 August 2010 he was signed by Olé Brasil.

On 9 August 2010, Sporting Braga signed him on loan from unnamed club, as the club had sold it keepers Eduardo to Genoa and Paweł Kieszek to Porto, moreover, it new signing former Portuguese internationals Quim was injured. Braga also loaned their youth product Mário Felgueiras (who played in UEFA Champions League third qualifying round) after signed Felipe.

Felipe then immediately included in the starting line-up, in the 3–1 won against Portimonense in the opening match of 2010–11 Portuguese Liga, ahead another new signing Artur on 13 August 2010.

=== Flamengo ===
After a short stint on Braga, Felipe returned to Brazil on a one-year loan to Flamengo, with an option for the Rio club to purchase him in 2011, and with a rescision clause in case of disciplinary problems, added by the request of Patrícia Amorim, president of Flamengo, due to the controversial Bruno case. His signing was a bet from coach Vanderlei Luxemburgo. Felipe made his debut on a friendly match against Londrina, which ended in a goalless draw. During the match, Londrina were awarded a penalty kick, which was defended by Felipe.

Felipe soon fell in the graces of the rubro-negro supporters after defending two penalty kicks in the Taça Guanabara semifinals against Botafogo and for performing well at another semi-final match, this time against Fluminense where Flamengo advanced to the Taça Rio finals. Flamengo defeated rivals Vasco da Gama at the Taça Rio finals, winning the Campeonato Carioca and being crowned as the best goalkeeper of the tournament.

On the farewell match of Dejan Petkovic, Felipe made four important saves, preventing his former club Corinthians from winning the match and 'spoiling' the Serbians' final match for Flamengo. Felipe renewed his contract with Flamengo to December 2015 in January 2012, with his rights being purchased for R$ 3 million from Olé Brasil.

On 27 January 2015 Felipe had his contract canceled by Flamengo.

=== Figueirense ===
On 24 April 2015, Felipe joined Figueirense along with Carlos Alberto.

=== Differdange 03 ===
In August 2024, Felipe moved to the Luxembourgish team Differdange 03.

== Career statistics ==
Updated 13 March 2013

Club performance			League		Cup		League Cup		Continental		Total	
Season	Club	League	Apps	Goals	Apps	Goals	Apps	Goals	Apps	Goals	Apps	Goals
Brazil			League		Copa do Brasil		League Cup		South America		Total	
2003	Vitória	Série A	1	0	0	0	–		–		1	0
2004	Vitória	Série A	4	0	0	0	–		–		4	0
2005	Vitória	Série B	15	0	4	0	–		–		19	0
2005	São Caetano	Série A	0	0	–		–		–		0	0
2006	Bragantino	N/A	0	0	–		–		–		0	0
2006	Portuguesa (loan)	Série B	16	0	–		–		–		16	0
2007	Bragantino	N/A	0	0	–		21	0	–		21	0
2007	Corinthians	Série A	37	0	–		–		2	0	39	0
2008	Corinthians	Série B	33	0	11	0	17	0	–		61	0
2009	Corinthians	Série A	31	0	10	0	23	0	–		64	0
2010	Corinthians	Série A	7	0	–		14	0	4	0	25	0
Portugal			League		Taça de Portugal		Taça da Liga		Europe		Total	
2010–11	Braga (loan)	Primeira Liga	12	0	0	0	0	0	7	0	19	0
Brazil			League		Copa do Brasil		League Cup		South America		Total	
2011	Flamengo (loan)	Série A	35	0	6	0	19	0	3	0	63	0
2012	Flamengo	Série A	20	0	–		12	0	7	0	38	0
2013	Flamengo	Série A	25	0	12	0	15	0	–		52	0
2014	Flamengo	Série A	8	0	0	0	15	0	6	0	29	0
Total	Brazil		232	0	43	0	136	0	22	0	433	0
Total	Portugal		12	0	0	0	0	0	7	0	19	0
Career total			244	0	43	0	136	0	29	0	452	0

- Note: State Leagues are marked as League Cup, statistics available only since 2007.

== Honours ==
=== Club ===
Vitória

- Campeonato Baiano: 2003, 2004, 2005
- Copa do Nordeste: 2003

Corinthians

- Campeonato Brasileiro Série B: 2008
- Campeonato Paulista: 2009
- Copa do Brasil: 2009

Flamengo

- Campeonato Carioca: 2011, 2014
- Copa do Brasil: 2013

Sampaio Corrêa

- Campeonato Maranhense: 2024

Differdange

- Luxembourg National Division: 2024–25
- Luxembourg Cup: 2024–25, 2025–26

=== International ===
Brazil U-17

- South American Under 17 Football Championship: 2001

=== Individual ===
- 2011 Campeonato Carioca Best Goalkeeper
