= Carlos Alberto (footballer, born 1978) =

Brazilian footballer

Personal information
- Full name: Carlos Alberto de Oliveira Júnior
- Date of birth: 24 January 1978 (age 48)
- Place of birth: Rio de Janeiro, Brazil
- Height: 1.70 m (5 ft 7 in)
- Position: Defensive midfielder

Team information
- Current team: Joinville

Senior career*
Years	Team	Apps	(Gls)
2000	Joinville		
2001	Marcílio Dias		
2002	Guarani-MG		
2002–2003	Caxias-SC		
2003–2007	Figueirense	106	(5)
2007–2010	Corinthians	23	(0)
2009–2010	→ Atlético Mineiro (loan)	32	(2)
2010–2011	Goiás	49	(3)
2012–2013	Joinville		
2013	Anápolis		
2014–2015	Metropolitano		
2015–2018	Brusque		
2016	→ Marcílio Dias (loan)		
2019	Camboriú		

International career
2003	Brazil U20		
- * Club domestic league appearances and goals

Carlos Alberto de Oliveira Júnior (born 24 January 1978 in Rio de Janeiro), or simply Carlos Alberto, is a Brazilian former professional footballer who played as defensive midfielder.

He won the 2003 FIFA World Youth Championship, using fake document to claim that he was born on 24 January 1983. Because of this, he was banned for 360 days from football.

== Honours ==
Brazil U20

- FIFA U-20 World Cup: 2003

Joinville

- Campeonato Catarinense: 2000
- Copa Santa Catarina: 2012

Caxias-SC

- Campeonato Catarinense Série B: 2002

Figueirense

- Campeonato Catarinense: 2003, 2004, 2006

Corinthians

- Campeonato Brasileiro Série B: 2008

Atlético Mineiro

- Campeonato Mineiro: 2010

Brusque

- Campeonato Catarinense Série B: 2015
- Copa Santa Catarina: 2018, 2019
