= Alexandre Finazzi =

Brazilian footballer (born 1973)

Personal information
- Full name: Alexandre Silveira Finazzi
- Date of birth: 20 August 1973 (age 53)
- Place of birth: São João da Boa Vista, Brazil
- Height: 1.86 m (6 ft 1 in)
- Position: Forward

Team information
- Current team: Tapajós (head coach)

Youth career
- 1991–1992: Guarani

Senior career*
Years	Team	Apps	(Gls)
1991	Palmeiras FC		
1996	São Paulo	0	(0)
1997	Botafogo-SP		
1998	Novo Hamburgo	9	(2)
1998	Rio Branco de Andradas		
1999–2001	Goiânia		
1999	→ Gama (loan)	7	(2)
2000	→ Sochaux (loan)	5	(0)
2001	Vila Nova		
2001–2003	Fortaleza		
2002	→ Goiás (loan)	8	(3)
2003	→ Omiya Ardija (loan)	6	(1)
2004	ABC		
2004	Santa Cruz		
2005	América-SP		(17)
2005	Paulista	4	(5)
2005	Atlético Paranaense	25	(14)
2006	Fortaleza		
2007	Ponte Preta	18	(12)
2007–2008	Corinthians	35	(15)
2008	São Caetano	18	(6)
2009	Mirassol	12	(2)
2009	Mixto	6	(0)
2009–2010	Ponte Preta	30	(12)
2010	Fortaleza	5	(2)
2011	Bragantino	19	(4)
2011	Remo	4	(0)
2011	Goiânia	3	(1)
2011	Anapolina	3	(1)
2011	Bragantino	4	(0)
2012	XV de Jaú	7	(1)
2012	Goiânia	9	(4)
2013	Poços de Caldas		
2013	Itumbiara	3	(1)
2013	Goiânia	13	(13)
2013	Rioverdense	14	(10)
2014	Itapirense	14	(2)

Managerial career
- 2020: Goiânia
- 2022: Itumbiara
- 2023: Rio Branco-PR (assistant)
- 2023: Costa Rica
- 2023: Parauapebas
- 2024–: Tapajós
- * Club domestic league appearances and goals

Alexandre Silveira Finazzi (born 20 August 1973), known as Finazzi, is a Brazilian professional football coach and former player who played as a forward. He is the current head coach of Tapajós.

== Biography ==
Finazzi had a journeyman career. Despite born in Brazil, he is known as Mr. Finazzi instead of other artist name derived from given name or nickname, which the latter was more common in Brazil. Finazzi had a brief spells in 2000–01 French Division 2 before returned to Brazil. It was followed by another brief career in Japan in January 2003. In June 2003 Finazzi returned to Brazil.

In January 2005 he signed a contract for América until the end of 2005 Campeonato Paulista. Finazzi was the topscorer of the state league. In May 2005 Finazzi left for Paulista for 2005 Campeonato Brasileiro Série B. In July 2005 Finazzi moved to Atlético Paranaense for 2005 Campeonato Brasileiro Série A.

In February 2006 Finazzi signed a one-year contract with Fortaleza. The club relegated from 2006 Campeonato Brasileiro Série A. In January 2007 Finazzi left for Ponte Preta until the end of 2007 Campeonato Paulista during which he scored 12 goals. In May 2007 Finazzi was signed by another top division club Corinthians. Finazzi signed a new one-year deal in January 2008, after the club relegated to 2008 Campeonato Brasileiro Série B. In June 2008 Finazzi left for São Caetano in one-year deal. In January 2009 Finazzi left for Mirassol until the end of 2009 Campeonato Paulista. In May 2009 Finazzi left for Mixto until the end of 2009 Campeonato Brasileiro Série C. In September 2009 Finazzi returned to Ponte Preta for the remainder of 2009 Campeonato Brasileiro Série B.

In December 2009 Finazzi signed a new one-year deal. In July 2010 Finazzi left for Fortaleza until the end of 2010 Campeonato Brasileiro Série C. In September 2010 Finazzi moved to Bragantino until the end of 2010 Campeonato Brasileiro Série B. In March 2011 Finazzi left for Remo. In July 2011 he was signed by Goiânia. In August 2011 Finazzi was signed by Anapolina. In September 2011 Finazzi returned to Bragantino again.

In February 2012 Finazzi left for XV de Jaú until the end of 2012 Campeonato Paulista Série A3.

== Personal honours ==
- Campeonato Paulista top scorer: 2005
