= Bruno Octávio =

Brazilian footballer (born 1985)

Personal information
- Full name: Bruno Octávio Jovanelli
- Date of birth: 2 August 1985 (age 41)
- Place of birth: São Caetano do Sul, Brazil
- Height: 1.83 m (6 ft 0 in)
- Position: Defensive midfielder

Youth career
- 2002–2003: Corinthians

Senior career*
Years	Team	Apps	(Gls)
2004–2012	Corinthians	104	(0)
2009	→ Figueirense (loan)	16	(0)
2010	→ Bahia (loan)	16	(0)
2012	→ Paulista (loan)	7	(0)
2013	→ Gremio (loan)	5	(0)
- * Club domestic league appearances and goals as of 14 June 2013

Bruno Octávio Jovanelli, or simply Bruno Octávio, (born 2 August 1985) is a Brazilian former professional footballer who played as a defensive midfielder.

== Youth career ==
Octávio began his football career in 1998, when he played for the U13 team for the Brazilian football team Corinthians. In 1999, he switched to the U15 team to fit his age, and then in 2001 went to the U17 team.

== Career ==
After a few years of playing for Corinthians B, a side team, Octávio joined the main Corinthians team in 2004. In 2005, he was a starter for the team, and that year Corinthians won the 2005 Campeonato Brasileiro Série A. He would stick with the team, playing 102 matches, until 2012, when he was loaned to Figueirense FC. In 2010 he returned to Corinthians, but an excess of defensive midfielders caused him to see little playtime. For this reason, he was then loaned to Bahia, another Brazilian football club. After returning to Corinthians in 2011, he joined the team in their win in the 2011 Campeonato Brasileiro Série A, this becoming his second Campeonato Brasileiro Série A win with Corinthains. Due to a lack of opportunities within the team, Octávio was released from his contract in 2012, and joined Paulista. After stints in Araxá, Grêmio Barueri, and Marcílio Dias, Octávio retired at the age of 29, citing injuries as the reason.
