= Cacique Doble =

Municipality in Rio Grande do Sul, Brazil

Coordinates: 27°45′S 51°37′W

- Municipality
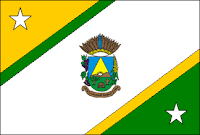
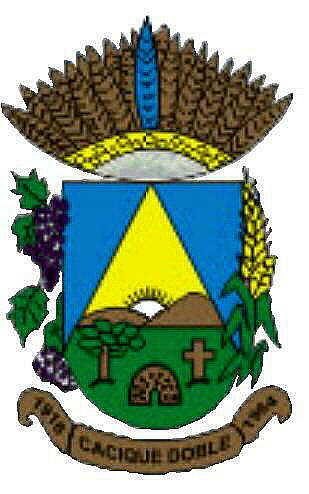
- Flag Coat of arms
- Interactive map of Cacique Doble
- Country: Brazil
- Time zone: UTC−3 (BRT)

Cacique Doble is a municipality in the state of Rio Grande do Sul, Brazil. As of 2020, the estimated population was 5,074. Cacique Doble was founded on June 1, 1964. Named after Kaingang leader Faustino Ferreira Doble, it is a small, rural-focused city with a population of 4,603 as of 2022. The city is known for its cultural heritage, including Italian traditions, a local park, and a strong agricultural community.

== See also ==
- List of municipalities in Rio Grande do Sul
