= Serra Dourada =

Municipality of Bahia State, Brazil

- Municipality of Bahia, Brazil
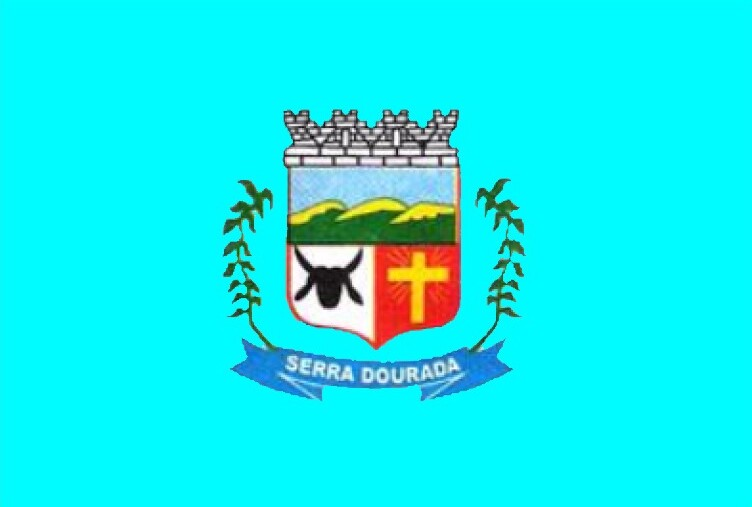
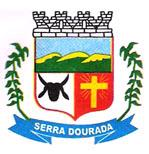
- Flag Coat of arms

- Location of Serra Dourada in Bahia

- Location within Brazil Location within South America
- Coordinates: 12°45′39″S 43°57′0″W
- Country: Brazil
- Region: Northeast
- State: Bahia
- Founded: 12 July 1962

Government
  - Mayor: Auzenildo Sousa Costa (PT) (2025-2028)
  - Vice Mayor: Jose Milton Frota de Souza (PT) (2025-2028)

Area
  - Total: 1,592.245 km^{2} (614.769 sq mi)
- Elevation: 516 m (1,693 ft)

Population (2022)
  - Total: 17,066
  - Density: 10.72/km^{2} (27.8/sq mi)
- Demonym: Serra-douradense (Brazilian Portuguese)
- Time zone: UTC-03:00 (Brasília Time)
- Postal code: 47740-000
- HDI (2010): 0.608 – medium
- Website: serradourada.ba.gov.br

Serra Dourada is a municipality in the Brazilian state of Bahia. In 2020, the estimated population was 17,321.

== See also ==
- List of municipalities in Bahia
