= Boiadeiro (footballer, born 1984) =

Brazilian footballer

Personal information
- Full name: Thiago Xavier da Rosa
- Date of birth: 24 September 1984 (age 42)
- Place of birth: Rio de Janeiro, Brazil
- Height: 1.72 m (5 ft 8 in)
- Position: Right-back

Youth career
- 2001–2004: Madureira

Senior career*
| Years | Team | Apps | (Gls) |
| 2005–2006 | Madureira | 6 | (0) |
| 2005 | → Bangu (loan) | | |
| 2006 | → Duque de Caxias (loan) | | |
| 2006 | Olaria | | |
| 2007 | Volta Redonda | | |
| 2007–2008 | Ituano | 19 | (1) |
| 2008 | Bacabal | | |
| 2008 | Paysandu | 16 | (5) |
| 2009–2011 | Ceará | 134 | (8) |
| 2010 | → Itumbiara (loan) | | |
| 2010 | → Ipatinga (loan) | 8 | (0) |
| 2012 | Bahia | 0 | (0) |
| 2012 | América Mineiro | 24 | (1) |
| 2013 | Guarani | 0 | (0) |
| 2013 | Joinville | 0 | (0) |
| 2014 | Villa Nova-MG | 0 | (0) |
- * Club domestic league appearances and goals

Thiago Xavier da Rosa (born 24 September 1984), known as Boiadeiro or Thiago Xavier in early career, is a Brazilian former professional footballer who played as a right-back.

== Career ==
Born in Rio de Janeiro, Thiago Xavier signed a five-year contract with Madureira in August 2001. He played all six matches for Madureira at 2005 Campeonato Brasileiro Série C.

He also loaned to Bangu for 2005 Campeonato Carioca Second Division in March 2005. In April 2006 he signed a contract with Duque de Caxias which last until the end of 2006 Campeonato Carioca Second Division. On 1 August 2006, he was signed by Olaria. for a qualification tournament to 2007 Campeonato Carioca First/Second Division.

In February 2007, he was signed by Volta Redonda for 2007 Campeonato Carioca. He scored the opening goal in his debut match, on 11 March, the first match of Taça Rio, now as Boiadeiro (cowboy). He also played rest of the Taça Rio matches, in total of 7 (6 out of 6 group stage, 1 semifinal).

=== Ituano ===
On 12 June 2007, he was signed by Ituano for 2007 Campeonato Brasileiro Série B and Copa FPF. He made his league debut on 16 June (round 6) and made a successive 17 league appearances. Missed the round 23, he started the last time on round 24 and waited until the last round to play again and as substitute. In the state Cup, he played his first and last match on 5 September, the second last match of the group stage (the 11th of 12)

In February 2008, during 2008 Campeonato Paulista, he was released after only played 4 times, which he scored an own goal in his last appearance against Corinthians Paulista.

=== Bacabal & Paysandu ===
In March 2008 he signed a contract with Bacabal which last until 30 November, which he won Taça Cidade de São Luís with team. After the start of Campeonato Maranhense, he left for fellow Campeonato Brasileiro Série C team Paysandu and draw into the same group. Eventually Paysandu reached the third stage (round of 16), finished as the third out of 4 teams in Group 25.

=== Ceará ===
On 1 January 2009 he signed a 3-year contract with Ceará. He played for the team at 2009 Campeonato Cearense, 2009 Copa do Brasil and at 2009 Campeonato Brasileiro Série B.

He won the opening season of the state league and finished as the runner-up of the state league. He scored 2 goals in 21 state league appearances, 2 appearances in the Brazilian National Cup and 33 appearances in national Série B league. The team finished as the third and promoted to 2010 Campeonato Brasileiro Série A.

He scored 2 goals in 12 appearances at 2010 Campeonato Cearense. After played the third match of the state league closing season on 7 March and on 10 March as unused bench, he was loaned to Itumbiara for Campeonato Goiano on 11 March. He made his debut on 14 March 2010, the round 14 match. In total, he made a successive five appearances from round 14 to the last round: the 18th round. He returned to Ceará on 9 April.

On 31 May 2010, he was loaned to Ipatinga along with teammate Preto. He made his league debut on 1 June, round 6 of 2010 Campeonato Brasileiro Série B. He also started the next match (5 June, round 7). But he then lost his starting place to Luizinho who recovered from injury. He substituted Luizinho at half time in round 12 (6 August) and made a successive 3 appearances as sub (Round 12 to 14) and took the starting place back in round 15 (21 August) to round 17 (27 August). After Luizinho recovered from injury again, Boiadeiro lost his starting place and returned to Ceará on 17 September after Ipatinga re-signed Márcio Gabriel.

== Honours ==
State

- Taça Cidade de São Luís: 2008 (Bacabal)
- Taça Estado do Ceará: 2009 (Ceará)
- Taça Cidade de Fortaleza: 2010 (Ceará)
