= Careca (futsal player) =

Brazilian futsal player

Personal information
- Full name: Fernando Lopes Pereira
- Date of birth: 4 March 1989 (age 37)
- Place of birth: Jandira, Brazil
- Height: 1.78 m (5 ft 10 in)
- Position: Goalkeeper

Team information
- Current team: Atlântico
- Number: 1

Youth career
- 1995–2009: Grêmio Barueri

Senior career*
Years	Team	Apps	(Gls)
2009	Grêmio Barueri		
2010	Palmeiras		
2011	São José		
2014	Grêmio Mogiano		
2015–2017	Corinthians		
2018–	Atlântico	35	(0)

International career^{‡}
2017–	Brazil		
- * Club domestic league appearances and goals as of 00:00, 22 June 2019 (UTC) ‡ National team caps and goals as of 00:00, 22 June 2019 (UTC)

Fernando Lopes Pereira (born 4 March 1989), known as Careca, is a Brazilian futsal player who plays as a goalkeeper for Atlântico and the Brazilian national futsal team.
