= Careca (footballer, born 1989) =

Brazilian footballer

Personal information
- Full name: Leomir Silva Teles
- Date of birth: 17 August 1989 (age 37)
- Place of birth: Campo Grande, Brazil
- Height: 1.77 m (5 ft 9 1/2 in)
- Position: Striker

Team information
- Current team: Red Bull Brasil

Youth career
- –2006: Bahia

Senior career*
Years	Team	Apps	(Gls)
2007–2008	Bahia	0	(0)
2008–2011	Corinthians		
2009	→ Noroeste (loan)	4	(1)
2009	→ São Caetano (loan)	11	(0)
2010	→ Red Bull Brasil (loan)		
2010	→ Nacional-SP (loan)		
2011	→ Monte Azul (loan)	21	(6)
2012	Comercial-SP		
2012–2013	CENE	8	(3)
2013	Paysandu	20	(6)
2014	Red Bull Brasil	0	(0)
2015	Caldense	8	(1)
2016	Aparacidense	0	(0)
2017	Brusque	8	(4)
2018	Maringá	3	(0)
2018	Brusque	6	(0)
2020–	Águia Negra	0	(0)
- * Club domestic league appearances and goals as of 08:25, 23 June 2020 (UTC)

Leomir Silva Teles, better known as Careca (born 17 August 1989), is a Brazilian footballer who currently plays as a striker for Esporte Clube Águia Negra.

== Career ==
Born in Campo Grande, Mato Grosso do Sul, he started his career at age 17 with Esporte Clube Bahia in the same year he moved to Cene, where he played his first major trophy, the Brazilian Cup

Despite failing to help the club in a good position, he was one of the highlights of the team. In 2007, the Bahia is hired where there is very leveraged and remains in Bahia club until the end of the year.

Back to football in Campo Grande, now the Black Eagle, Bald stood out in South Matogrossense Championship of 2008 when he made 17 goals in 13 games.

The young striker was also well in the Brazil Cup 2008, scoring four goals in two games and drew the attention of the Corinthians, who brought you to the Parque São Jorge.

Careca played in the Nacional (SP) on loan from Corinthians Paulista.
