= Pedrão (footballer, born 1978) =

Brazilian footballer

Personal information
- Full name: Christiano Florêncio da Silva
- Date of birth: April 5, 1978 (age 48)
- Place of birth: Jaboticabal, Brazil
- Height: 1.74 m (5 ft 8 1/2 in)
- Position: Centre forward

Youth career
- 1996–1997: Jaboticabal

Senior career*
Years	Team	Apps	(Gls)
1998	Jaboticabal		
1999	Botafogo-SP		
2000	São Raimndo-AM		
2000	Taquaritinga		
2001	Comercial		
2002	Sertãozinho		
2003	Barretos		
2004–2008	Barueri		
2006	→ Portuguesa (loan)		
2008	Seongnam FC	0	(0)
2008–2009	Barueri	67	(53)
2009–2010	Al-Shabab		
2010	Goiás	4	(0)
2010	São Caetano	8	(0)
2011	Linense		
2011	Vitória		
2011	Linense		
2011	Jaboticabal	1	(0)
2011	Barueri	16	(5)
2012	América-SP	8	(2)
2012	Guarujá		
2013	Sertãozinho	22	(8)
2014	Rio Branco-SP	10	(4)
2014–2015	Inter de Bebedouro		
2015	Ubiratan		
2015	Itaporã		
- * Club domestic league appearances and goals

Christiano Florêncio da Silva known by his nickname, Pedrão (born April 5, 1978), is a Brazilian former football striker.

== Career ==
He joined South Korean side Seongnam Ilhwa Chuma and appeared only three matches in Korean League Cup.

== Titles ==
=== Barueri ===
- São Paulo A3 State League: 2005
- São Paulo A2 State League: 2006
- São Paulo Interior State League: 2008
