= Germán Herrera (footballer, born 1983) =

Argentine footballer

Personal information
- Full name: Germán Gustavo Herrera
- Date of birth: 19 July 1983 (age 43)
- Place of birth: Granadero Baigorria, Argentina
- Height: 1.80 m (5 ft 11 in)
- Position: Second striker

Youth career
- 2001–2002: Rosario Central

Senior career*
Years	Team	Apps	(Gls)
2002–2004	Rosario Central	28	(5)
2004–2007	San Lorenzo	42	(7)
2006–2007	→ Grêmio (loan)	24	(9)
2007	Real Sociedad	19	(1)
2007	San Lorenzo	2	(0)
2007–2008	Gimnasia La Plata	14	(1)
2008	→ Corinthians (loan)	59	(23)
2009–2010	Grêmio	24	(4)
2010–2012	Botafogo	60	(18)
2012–2015	Emirates Club	35	(16)
2015	Vasco da Gama	12	(0)
2016–2019	Rosario Central	68	(14)

International career
2003	Argentina U-20	12	(4)
- * Club domestic league appearances and goals

Germán Gustavo Herrera (born 19 July 1983 in Granadero Baigorria, Santa Fe) is an Argentine retired forward.

== Club career ==
Herrera played for Real Sociedad in 2006/07, before moving to San Lorenzo de Almagro, but only made two appearances for them before joining Gimnasia y Esgrima de La Plata. He then moved to Brazil to play for Corinthians and Grêmio, and for the 2010 season he joined Botafogo.

In July 2012, he signed a contract with the UAE side Emirates Club.

On 9 April 2019, Herrera announced his retirement from football.

== International career ==
Herrera also has 12 caps for the Argentina Under-20 team and has scored 4 goals.

== Honours ==
Grêmio

- Campeonato Gaúcho: 2006

Corinthians

- Campeonato Brasileiro Série B: 2008 Campeonato Brasileiro Série B

Botafogo

- Campeonato Carioca: 2010
- Taça Guanabara: 2010
- Taça Rio: 2010, 2012

Rosario Central

- Copa Argentina: 2017–18

== Other campaigns ==
- Argentina national football team
  - FIFA U-20 World Cup: 2003 4th place
- Corinthians
  - Brazilian Cup: 2008 runner-up
- Emirates Club
  - UAE Division 1 Group A: 2012-13 champions
