= Tuta (footballer, born 1974) =

Brazilian footballer

Personal information
- Full name: Moacir Bastos
- Date of birth: June 20, 1974 (age 52)
- Place of birth: São Paulo, Brazil
- Height: 1.88 m (6 ft 2 in)
- Position: Striker

Youth career
- 1992–1994: Araçatuba

Senior career*
Years	Team	Apps	(Gls)
1994	Araçatuba		
1995	XV de Piracicaba		
1996	Araçatuba		
1996	Juventude	3	(0)
1997–1998	Portuguesa	22	(5)
1998	Atlético Paranaense	39	(15)
1998–1999	Venezia	18	(3)
1999	Vitória		
2000–2002	Flamengo	26	(12)
2001	→ Palmeiras (loan)	11	(7)
2002	→ Anyang LG Cheetahs (loan)	18	(9)
2003	Suwon Samsung Bluewings	31	(14)
2004	Coritiba	41	(16)
2004–2007	Fluminense	112	(51)
2007	Grêmio	25	(9)
2008	Figueirense	5	(5)
2008–2009	São Caetano	20	(10)
2009–2010	Náutico	5	(0)
2010–2011	Resende	9	(1)
2011	Brasiliense	6	(0)
2012	União Barbarense		
2013	Juventus		
2013	Barra da Tijuca		
2014	Flamengo-PI		
2014–2015	Francisco Beltrão		
2016	Taboão da Serra		
- * Club domestic league appearances and goals

Moacir Bastos, usually known simply as Tuta (born 20 June 1974) is a Brazilian retired footballer who played as a striker.

== Club career ==
Born in Palmital, São Paulo, during his career, he played for several clubs, most of them from Brazil: Araçatuba in 1994, 1995, and 1996, XV de Piracicaba in 1995, Juventude in 1996, Guarulhos in 1996, Paulista in 1997, and 1998, Portuguesa in 1997, Atlético Paranaense in 1998, Vitória in 1999, Flamengo in 2000 and 2002, Palmeiras in 2000 and 2001, Coritiba in 2004, and Fluminense, in 2005 and 2006.

He played for three non-Brazilian teams, Venezia, of Italy, in 1998-99, FC Seoul was then known as Anyang LG Cheetahs of South Korea, K League, in 2002 and Suwon Samsung Bluewings, also of South Korea, in 2003.

On January 24, 1999, he became well known after scoring a goal in the last minute in the 2-1 S.S.C. Venezia victory against Bari. Many Venezia players did not celebrate the goal or the victory, raising suspicions that the match was fixed to end in a draw. Tuta told the press that he had suspected a deal to end the match in a draw. However, on January 27, he denied his previous affirmation, justifying it as a misinterpretation by the press due to his limited capacity of speaking the Italian language.
