= 2008 Campeonato Brasileiro Série B =

Campeonato Brasileiro Série B
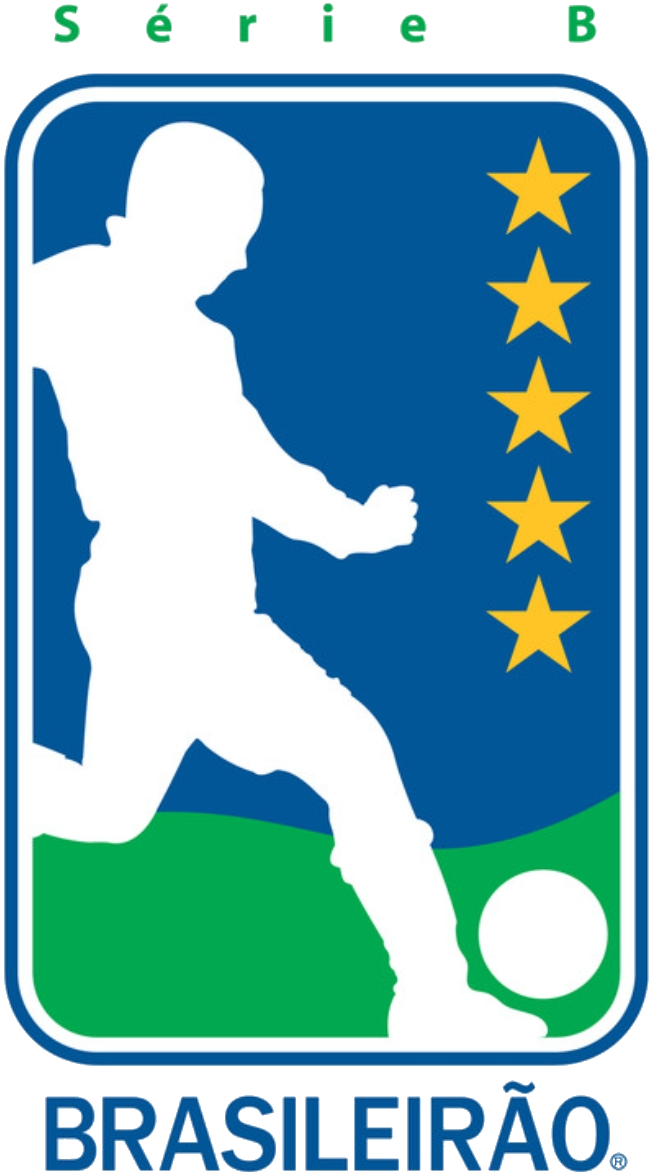
- Season: 2008
- Champions: Corinthians; 1st Série B title
- Promoted: Corinthians; Santo André; Avaí; Barueri
- Relegated: Marília; Criciúma; Gama; CRB
- Goals scored: 1,069
- Average goals/game: 2.81
- Top goalscorer: Túlio (Vila Nova) - 24 goals
- Highest attendance: 48,010 – Fortaleza v Brasiliense
- Lowest attendance: 81 – Bragantino v CRB

The Campeonato Brasileiro Série B, namely the second level of Brazilian football league system, was contested by 20 teams in 2008. Giants Corinthians played Série B for the first time after its poor season in Série A in 2007. Also, former Série A champions Bahia returned from Série C.

The tournament started on May 9 and Corinthians begun defeating CRB 3-2 in São Paulo. Due to its tradition and huge number of supporters, Corinthians attracted most of the attention from the media. The club won the first six matches and never left the top of the table. Promotion came on round 32 - six matches before the end of season - after defeating Ceará 2-0 in São Paulo. They were crowned champions two rounds later, beating Criciúma 2-0 as visitors.

Avaí was the second team to reach Série A as they defeated Brasiliense 1-0 on Round 35. One week later, Santo André also reached promotion after their 3-2 win as visitors against Ceará. Finally, Barueri completed the G4 (as the group of promoted teams are called) on Round 37 after beating América de Natal 3-0 at home.

On the other side of the table, CRB's poor record caused the club relegation on Round 33. Gama saw their hope comes to an end three weeks later. In the last round, on November 29, Criciúma and Marília could not escape as Fortaleza and América de Natal won their last matches and managed to stay out of the bottom four.

Vila Nova and former Brazilian international Túlio was the top scorer of the competition with 24 goals in the age of 39 years.

== Team information ==
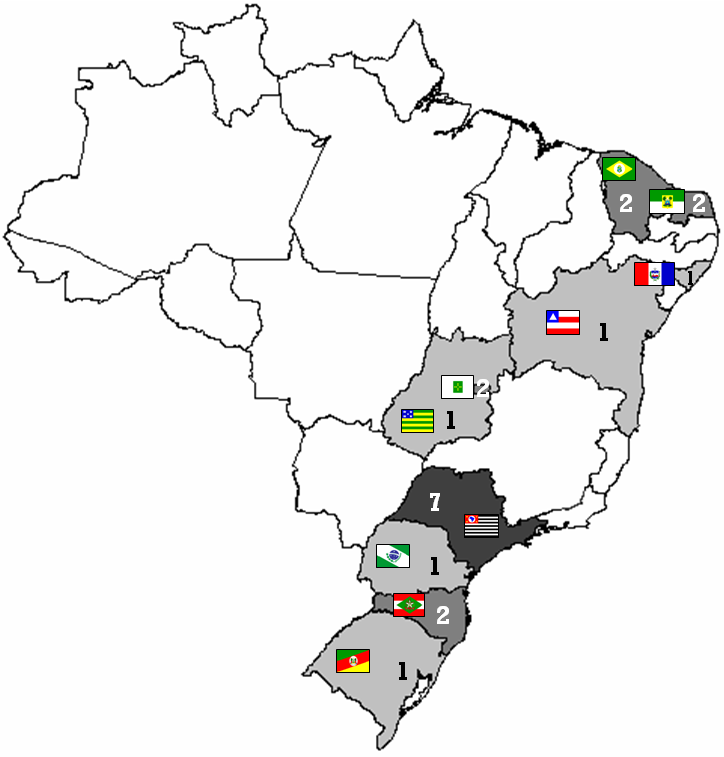
Participating teams of the Brazilian Championship of 2008, divided by state.

Team	City	Stadium	2007 Season	Ranking CBF
ABC	Natal	Frasqueirão	4th in Série C	53rd
América	Natal	Machadão	20th in Série A	30th
Avaí	Florianópolis	Ressacada	15th in Série B	43rd
Bahia	Salvador	Jóia da Princesa	2nd in Série C	18th
Bragantino	Bragança Paulista	Marcelo Stéfani	Série C Champions	42nd
Brasiliense	Taguatinga	Boca do Jacaré	9th in Série B	68th
Ceará	Fortaleza	Castelão	16th in Série B	25th
CRB	Maceió	Pajuçara	8th in Série B	36th
Corinthians	São Paulo	Pacaembu	17th in Série A	2nd
Criciúma	Criciúma	Heriberto Hülse	7th in Série B	28th
Fortaleza	Fortaleza	Castelão	5th in Série B	29th
Gama	Gama	Bezerrão	12th in Série B	48th
Barueri	Barueri	Arena Barueri	13th in Série B	131st
Juventude	Caxias do Sul	Alfredo Jaconi	18th in Série A	27th
Marília	Marília	Bento de Abreu	6th in Série B	67th
Paraná	Curitiba	Vila Capanema	19th in Série A	23rd
Ponte Preta	Campinas	Moisés Lucarelli	11th in Série B	24th
Santo André	Santo André	Bruno José Daniel	14th in Série B	59th
São Caetano	São Caetano do Sul	Anacleto Campanella	10th in Série B	45th
Vila Nova	Goiânia	Serra Dourada	3rd in Série C	44th

== Standings ==
Pos	Team	Pld	W	D	L	GF	GA	GD	Pts	Promotion or relegation
1	Corinthians	38	25	10	3	79	29	+50	85	Promotion to Série A 2009
2	Santo André	38	19	11	8	71	45	+26	68	Promotion to Série A 2009
3	Avaí	38	18	13	7	71	40	+31	67	Promotion to Série A 2009
4	Barueri	38	20	3	15	58	55	+3	63	Promotion to Série A 2009
5	Ponte Preta	38	17	7	14	54	46	+8	58	
6	Vila Nova	38	17	7	14	57	55	+2	58	
7	Bragantino	38	16	9	13	47	41	+6	57	
8	Juventude	38	16	8	14	51	48	+3	56	
9	São Caetano	38	14	12	12	61	55	+6	54	
10	Bahia	38	14	10	14	47	65	−18	52	
11	Paraná	38	14	7	17	49	54	−5	49	
12	Ceará	38	12	13	13	52	50	+2	49	
13	ABC	38	12	12	14	55	57	−2	48	
14	Brasiliense	38	13	8	17	56	64	−8	47	
15	América de Natal	38	12	10	16	46	51	−5	46	
16	Fortaleza	38	12	9	17	56	56	0	45	
17	Marília	38	11	12	15	47	60	−13	45	Relegation to Série C 2009
18	Criciúma	38	11	8	19	40	54	−14	41	Relegation to Série C 2009
19	Gama	38	9	8	21	37	72	−35	35	Relegation to Série C 2009
20	CRB	38	5	9	24	35	72	−37	24	Relegation to Série C 2009

== Results ==
Home \ Away	ABC	AME	AVA	BAH	BAR	BRG	BSL	CEA	COR	CRB	CRI	FOR	GAM	JUV	MAR	PAR	PPR	SAD	CAE	VIL
ABC		0–0^{(R11)}	1–1^{(R21)}	5–1^{(R29)}	3–0^{(R34)}	0–0^{(R13)}	2–2^{(R14)}	3–1^{(R09)}	0–1^{(R03)}	1–0^{(R19)}	0–0^{(R06)}	1–4^{(R27)}	4–1^{(R23)}	1–1^{(R05)}	1–1^{(R36)}	1–0^{(R26)}	1–1^{(R37)}	1–3^{(R16)}	2–1^{(R31)}	3–2^{(R01)}
América	3–2^{(R30)}		1–5^{(R07)}	0–1^{(R02)}	3–1^{(R18)}	0–0^{(R35)}	3–4^{(R22)}	0–0^{(R25)}	2–0^{(R38)}	0–0^{(R33)}	1–0^{(R20)}	1–1^{(R10)}	2–0^{(R15)}	2–0^{(R28)}	3–0^{(R12)}	3–2^{(R08)}	2–1^{(R04)}	2–1^{(R32)}	1–1^{(R17)}	5–1^{(R24)}
Avaí	0–0^{(R02)}	1–1^{(R26)}		4–1^{(R28)}	3–0^{(R22)}	3–1^{(R17)}	1–0^{(R35)}	2–1^{(R08)}	1–1^{(R18)}	5–1^{(R15)}	3–0^{(R30)}	2–1^{(R24)}	2–0^{(R12)}	1–0^{(R10)}	3–1^{(R32)}	3–1^{(R20)}	2–1^{(R33)}	1–1^{(R04)}	2–2^{(R38)}	4–1^{(R06)}
Bahia	1–1^{(R10)}	3–0^{(R21)}	2–1^{(R09)}		0–1^{(R04)}	2–2^{(R14)}	1–0^{(R34)}	1–1^{(R26)}	0–3^{(R31)}	2–0^{(R36)}	2–0^{(R24)}	1–1^{(R01)}	2–2^{(R19)}	1–0^{(R27)}	2–1^{(R37)}	0–0^{(R06)}	2–1^{(R16)}	1–4^{(R22)}	1–1^{(R13)}	3–2^{(R30)}
Barueri	3–2^{(R15)}	3–0^{(R37)}	2–2^{(R03)}	3–2^{(R23)}		2–1^{(R09)}	3–1^{(R27)}	4–3^{(R12)}	1–4^{(R05)}	1–0^{(R26)}	1–0^{(R33)}	1–0^{(R36)}	2–0^{(R01)}	4–0^{(R19)}	1–0^{(R21)}	1–2^{(R32)}	1–0^{(R30)}	1–5^{(R06)}	1–2^{(R29)}	0–1^{(R16)}
Bragantino	1–1^{(R32)}	1–0^{(R16)}	3–2^{(R36)}	4–0^{(R33)}	0–2^{(R28)}		2–1^{(R10)}	1–1^{(R15)}	1–1^{(R08)}	3–2^{(R05)}	0–2^{(R12)}	0–1^{(R37)}	4–0^{(R30)}	0–1^{(R03)}	1–0^{(R26)}	3–0^{(R23)}	2–0^{(R21)}	1–0^{(R01)}	2–1^{(R25)}	2–1^{(R19)}
Brasiliense	1–0^{(R33)}	1–0^{(R03)}	0–1^{(R16)}	2–3^{(R15)}	0–1^{(R08)}	3–1^{(R29)}		3–1^{(R23)}	1–1^{(R25)}	6–3^{(R30)}	2–1^{(R32)}	0–0^{(R19)}	3–2^{(R26)}	2–2^{(R36)}	2–2^{(R01)}	1–2^{(R12)}	2–0^{(R09)}	1–1^{(R21)}	2–2^{(R05)}	2–1^{(R37)}
Ceará	3–1^{(R28)}	2–0^{(R06)}	0–0^{(R27)}	2–2^{(R07)}	1–0^{(R31)}	0–0^{(R34)}	3–0^{(R04)}		2–2^{(R13)}	1–0^{(R16)}	3–1^{(R11)}	1–0^{(R10)}	1–0^{(R37)}	2–1^{(R01)}	3–2^{(R19)}	1–1^{(R24)}	2–0^{(R22)}	2–3^{(R36)}	1–0^{(R14)}	1–2^{(R21)}
Corinthians	4–0^{(R22)}	2–0^{(R19)}	3–2^{(R37)}	0–1^{(R12)}	1–0^{(R24)}	2–0^{(R27)}	4–1^{(R06)}	2–0^{(R32)}		3–2^{(R01)}	0–0^{(R15)}	2–0^{(R04)}	5–0^{(R21)}	2–0^{(R16)}	5–0^{(R10)}	2–1^{(R33)}	3–0^{(R26)}	2–2^{(R30)}	1–0^{(R09)}	3–1^{(R36)}
CRB	1–3^{(R38)}	1–1^{(R14)}	1–1^{(R34)}	1–2^{(R17)}	1–2^{(R07)}	0–2^{(R24)}	2–1^{(R11)}	1–0^{(R35)}	1–2^{(R20)}		1–0^{(R04)}	0–3^{(R13)}	2–2^{(R25)}	0–2^{(R31)}	2–2^{(R08)}	3–0^{(R18)}	0–2^{(R10)}	0–0^{(R28)}	1–1^{(R02)}	1–2^{(R22)}
Criciúma	2–0^{(R25)}	1–0^{(R01)}	1–1^{(R11)}	1–2^{(R05)}	2–2^{(R14)}	1–0^{(R31)}	3–1^{(R13)}	2–0^{(R29)}	0–2^{(R34)}	3–0^{(R23)}		2–1^{(R07)}	2–0^{(R36)}	0–1^{(R21)}	3–2^{(R16)}	0–3^{(R09)}	0–3^{(R19)}	4–4^{(R37)}	2–1^{(R03)}	1–1^{(R27)}
Fortaleza	2–3^{(R08)}	2–1^{(R29)}	2–2^{(R05)}	5–1^{(R20)}	2–1^{(R17)}	1–2^{(R18)}	3–0^{(R38)}	2–2^{(R30)}	1–3^{(R23)}	2–2^{(R32)}	2–1^{(R26)}		5–1^{(R03)}	0–0^{(R25)}	0–1^{(R33)}	4–1^{(R02)}	0–3^{(R12)}	2–0^{(R15)}	1–0^{(R35)}	1–2^{(R09)}
Gama	0–2^{(R04)}	2–2^{(R34)}	0–3^{(R31)}	0–0^{(R38)}	0–2^{(R20)}	0–1^{(R11)}	1–0^{(R07)}	1–0^{(R18)}	1–3^{(R02)}	1–0^{(R06)}	2–0^{(R17)}	2–0^{(R22)}		2–0^{(R13)}	2–1^{(R28)}	1–2^{(R35)}	1–1^{(R24)}	0–4^{(R10)}	1–2^{(R27)}	2–2^{(R14)}
Juventude	3–0^{(R24)}	1–0^{(R09)}	1–0^{(R29)}	4–1^{(R08)}	3–2^{(R38)}	2–3^{(R22)}	2–0^{(R17)}	0–0^{(R20)}	1–2^{(R35)}	4–0^{(R12)}	1–0^{(R02)}	1–1^{(R06)}	3–2^{(R32)}		2–0^{(R04)}	1–1^{(R30)}	1–1^{(R15)}	2–1^{(R33)}	3–4^{(R18)}	4–3^{(R26)}
Marília	2–1^{(R17)}	2–1^{(R31)}	1–1^{(R13)}	3–1^{(R18)}	2–2^{(R02)}	1–1^{(R07)}	0–2^{(R20)}	2–1^{(R38)}	1–1^{(R29)}	0–0^{(R27)}	3–3^{(R35)}	4–2^{(R14)}	2–2^{(R09)}	1–0^{(R23)}		0–0^{(R03)}	3–1^{(R06)}	2–0^{(R24)}	2–1^{(R11)}	1–0^{(R34)}
Paraná	1–0^{(R07)}	2–1^{(R27)}	0–1^{(R01)}	3–0^{(R25)}	1–0^{(R13)}	2–2^{(R04)}	1–3^{(R31)}	2–2^{(R05)}	0–2^{(R14)}	4–0^{(R37)}	3–1^{(R28)}	3–1^{(R21)}	1–2^{(R16)}	1–2^{(R11)}	1–0^{(R22)}		1–0^{(R36)}	0–1^{(R19)}	2–3^{(R34)}	0–0^{(R10)}
Ponte Preta	1–2^{(R18)}	2–0^{(R23)}	3–2^{(R14)}	1–0^{(R35)}	3–0^{(R11)}	1–0^{(R02)}	2–2^{(R28)}	3–2^{(R03)}	1–1^{(R07)}	1–0^{(R29)}	3–1^{(R38)}	2–2^{(R31)}	1–2^{(R05)}	1–0^{(R34)}	2–0^{(R25)}	3–1^{(R17)}		2–1^{(R08)}	1–1^{(R20)}	2–0^{(R13)}
Santo André	4–2^{(R35)}	1–1^{(R13)}	1–0^{(R23)}	2–0^{(R03)}	2–1^{(R25)}	1–0^{(R20)}	1–3^{(R02)}	3–2^{(R17)}	1–1^{(R11)}	3–1^{(R09)}	1–0^{(R18)}	3–0^{(R34)}	2–0^{(R29)}	4–0^{(R14)}	2–2^{(R05)}	3–1^{(R38)}	1–3^{(R27)}		0–0^{(R07)}	2–1^{(R31)}
São Caetano	0–4^{(R12)}	1–2^{(R36)}	3–3^{(R19)}	3–1^{(R32)}	1–3^{(R10)}	2–0^{(R06)}	4–1^{(R24)}	2–2^{(R33)}	2–2^{(R28)}	2–4^{(R21)}	0–0^{(R22)}	3–1^{(R16)}	3–1^{(R08)}	2–1^{(R37)}	1–0^{(R30)}	3–1^{(R15)}	3–0^{(R01)}	1–1^{(R26)}		1–0^{(R04)}
Vila Nova	3–1^{(R20)}	3–2^{(R05)}	1–0^{(R25)}	1–1^{(R11)}	2–3^{(R35)}	2–0^{(R38)}	2–0^{(R18)}	1–0^{(R02)}	2–1^{(R17)}	2–1^{(R03)}	2–0^{(R08)}	1–0^{(R28)}	1–1^{(R33)}	1–1^{(R07)}	4–0^{(R15)}	0–2^{(R29)}	2–1^{(R32)}	2–2^{(R12)}	2–1^{(R23)}	

Legend: Blue = home team win; Yellow = draw; Red = away team win.

== Top scorers ==
#	Scorer	Team	Goals
1	(Brazil) Túlio	Vila Nova	24
2	(Brazil) Nunes	Bragantino	15
3	(Brazil) Dentinho	Corinthians	14
3	(Argentina) Herrera	Corinthians	14
3	(Brazil) Márcio Mixirica	Santo André	14
6	(Brazil) Pedrão	Barueri	13
7	(Brazil) Luiz Carlos	Ceará	12
7	(Brazil) Tuta	São Caetano	12
7	(Brazil) Jéferson	Santo André	12
10	(Brazil) Mendes	Juventude	11
Last Updated: 2008-11-29, *

== See also ==
- Série A 2008
- Série C 2008
- Copa do Brasil 2008
