= 2009 Campeonato Paulista =

Campeonato Paulista - Série A1
- Season: 2009
- Champions: Corinthians (26th title)
- Relegated: Guaratinguetá; Marília; Guarani; Noroeste
- Copa do Brasil: Corinthians; Santos
- Goals scored: 580
- Top goalscorer: Pedrão (16)

The 2009 Campeonato Paulista de Futebol Profissional da Primeira Divisão - Série A1 was the 108th season of São Paulo's top-flight professional football league. The season began on January 21 and ended on May 3. Corinthians were crowned the league champion after going through the competition undefeated. Grêmio Barueri was the top scorer with 16 goals.

== Participating teams ==
Club	Home city
Botafogo	Ribeirão Preto
Bragantino	Bragança Paulista
Corinthians	São Paulo (Tatuapé)
Grêmio Barueri	Barueri
Guarani	Campinas
Guaratinguetá	Guaratinguetá
Ituano	Itu
Marília	Marília
Mirassol	Mirassol
Mogi Mirim	Mogi Mirim
Noroeste	Bauru
Oeste	Itápolis
Palmeiras	São Paulo (Perdizes)
Paulista	Jundiaí
Ponte Preta	Campinas
Portuguesa	São Paulo (Pari)
Santo André	Santo André
Santos	Santos
São Caetano	São Caetano do Sul
São Paulo	São Paulo (Morumbi)

== First phase ==
Pos	Team	Pld	W	D	L	GF	GA	GD	Pts	Qualification or relegation
1	Palmeiras	19	13	5	1	38	17	+21	44	Advances to Semifinals
2	São Paulo	19	12	4	3	33	17	+16	40	Advances to Semifinals
3	Corinthians	19	10	9	0	33	15	+18	39	Advances to Semifinals
4	Santos	19	11	4	4	28	17	+11	37	Advances to Semifinals
5	Portuguesa	19	11	4	4	27	17	+10	37	
6	Santo André	19	10	3	6	31	20	+11	33	Qualification for Interior Championship of São Paulo
7	Mirassol	19	7	7	5	34	32	+2	28	Qualification for Interior Championship of São Paulo
8	Grêmio Barueri	19	7	6	6	29	27	+2	27	Qualification for Interior Championship of São Paulo
9	Ponte Preta	19	6	6	7	31	31	0	24	Qualification for Interior Championship of São Paulo
10	Bragantino	19	6	5	8	34	30	+4	23	
11	São Caetano	19	6	4	9	24	30	−6	22	
12	Paulista	19	5	5	9	26	28	−2	20	
13	Ituano	19	5	5	9	20	30	−10	20	
14	Oeste	19	4	8	7	22	27	−5	20	
15	Botafogo-SP	19	5	4	10	27	35	−8	19	
16	Mogi Mirim	19	5	4	10	22	36	−14	19	
17	Guaratinguetá	19	4	7	8	28	33	−5	19	Relegation to Campeonato Paulista Série A2
18	Marília	19	4	6	9	26	39	−13	18	Relegation to Campeonato Paulista Série A2
19	Guarani	19	3	5	11	12	27	−15	14	Relegation to Campeonato Paulista Série A2
20	Noroeste	19	3	5	11	18	35	−17	14	Relegation to Campeonato Paulista Série A2

Updated to match(es) played on 5 April 2009. Source: RSSSF Brazil
Rules for classification: 1) points; 2) goal difference; 3) number of goals scored.

== Knockout phase ==
=== Bracket ===
Semi-finals
1	Palmeiras	1	1	2
4	Santos	2	2	4
2	São Paulo	1	0	1
3	Corinthians	2	2	4

Finals
4	Santos	1	1	2
3	Corinthians	3	1	4

=== Semi-finals ===
Team 1	Agg.	Team 2	1st leg	2nd leg
Santos (Brazil)	4–2	(Brazil) Palmeiras	2–1	2–1
Corinthians (Brazil)	4–1	(Brazil) São Paulo	2–1	2–0

=== Finals ===
Team 1	Agg.	Team 2	1st leg	2nd leg
Santos (Brazil)	2–4	(Brazil) Corinthians	1–3	1–1

== Campeonato do Interior ==
=== Semi-finals ===
Team 1	Agg.	Team 2	1st leg	2nd leg
Grêmio Barueri (Brazil)	7–6	(Brazil) Mirassol	2–3	5–3
Ponte Preta (Brazil)	4–3	(Brazil) Santo André	3–2	1–1

=== Finals ===
Team 1	Agg.	Team 2	1st leg	2nd leg
Ponte Preta (Brazil)	3–1	(Brazil) Grêmio Barueri	2–0	1–1

== Top scorers ==
Rank	Player	Team	Goals
1	(Brazil) Pedrão	Grêmio Barueri	16
2	(Brazil) Keirrison	Palmeiras	13
3	(Brazil) Washington	São Paulo	12
4	(Brazil) Edno	Portuguesa	11
4	(Brazil) Kléber Pereira	Santos	11
5	(Brazil) Danilo Neco	Ponte Preta	10
5	(Brazil) Zé Carlos	Paulista	10
