= 2010 Campeonato Brasileiro Série A =

Campeonato Brasileiro Série A
- Season: 2010
- Champions: Fluminense; 2nd Campeonato Brasileiro title 3rd Brazilian title
- Relegated: Vitória; Guarani; Goiás; Grêmio Prudente
- Copa Libertadores: Fluminense; Cruzeiro; Corinthians; Grêmio
- Copa Sudamericana: Atlético Paranaense; Botafogo; São Paulo; Palmeiras; Vasco da Gama; Ceará; Atlético Mineiro; Flamengo
- Matches: 380
- Goals: 978 (2.57 per match)
- Top goalscorer: Jonas (23 goals)
- Biggest home win: Avaí 6–1 Grêmio Prudente (9 May)
- Biggest away win: Avaí 0–3 Fluminense (5 June); Guarani 0–3 Internacional (14 July); Goiás 0–3 Fluminense (25 August); Palmeiras 0–3 Atlético Goianiense (26 August); Avaí 0–3 Grêmio (19 September); São Paulo 0–3 Goiás (25 September); Vitória 0–3 Grêmio (2 October); Fluminense 0–3 Santos (6 October); São Paulo 1-4 Fluminense (21 November); Goiás 1–4 Santos (21 November); Grêmio Prudente 0–3 Internacional (2 December)
- Highest scoring: Avaí 6–1 Grêmio Prudente (9 May); Vitória 4–3 Atlético Mineiro (26 May); Corinthians 3–4 Atlético Goianiense (10 October); São Paulo 4–3 Santos (17 October); Cruzeiro 3–4 Atlético Mineiro (24 October)
- Longest winning run: 5 games: Botafogo (1 – 28 August); Cruzeiro (1 – 18 September)
- Longest unbeaten run: 15 games: Fluminense (26 May – 5 September)
- Longest losing run: 6 games: Goiás (14 August – 8 September)
- Highest attendance: 76,205: Vasco da Gama 2–2 Fluminense (22 August)
- Lowest attendance: 674: Grêmio Prudente 4–1 Goiás (7 November)
- Average attendance: 14,839

The 2010 Campeonato Brasileiro Série A was the 54th edition of the Campeonato Brasileiro Série A, the top-level of professional football in Brazil. It began on 8 May and ended on 5 December. Flamengo came as the defending champion having won the 2009 season.

== Format ==
For the eighth consecutive season, the tournament was in a double round-robin system. The team with most points was declared the champion. The bottom-four teams were relegated for the following season.

=== International qualification ===
The Série A served as a qualifier to CONMEBOL's 2011 international tournaments. Since Internacional won the 2010 Copa Libertadores, the top-two teams in the standings qualified to the Second Stage of the 2011 Copa Libertadores.

The format used then also specified that the next two best teams in the standings qualify to the First Stage, if the 2011 Copa Sudamericana isn't conquered by a Brazilian club. If that happens, the fourth placed team will not qualify to the Libertadores. Santos, as the winner of the 2010 Copa do Brasil, has an automatic berth to the Second Stage of the competition. The next eight best teams in the standings earn berths to the Second Stage of the 2011 Copa Sudamericana.

== Team information ==
Last season, Coritiba, Santo André, Náutico, and Sport were relegated after finishing in the last four position in the standings. There were replaced by four-time champion Vasco da Gama, one-time champion Guarani, Ceará, and Atlético Goianiense, the top-four finishers of the 2009 Série B.

During the off-season, Barueri-based club Grêmio Recreativo Barueri, simply known as Barueri, moved to Presidente Prudente, thus changed their name to Grêmio Prudente Futebol.

During the championship, some clubs' venues were transferred to secondary stadia as their home venues are being reformed in preparations for the 2014 FIFA World Cup to be held in Brazil.

Locations of the 2010 Série A teams

Team	City	Stadium	Capacity
Atlético Goianiense	Goiânia	Serra Dourada	45,000
Atlético Mineiro	Belo Horizonte	Mineirão; Arena do Jacaré; Ipatingão	75,783; 25,000; 20,500
Atlético Paranaense	Curitiba	Arena da Baixada	28,327
Avaí	Florianópolis	Ressacada	19,000
Botafogo	Rio de Janeiro	Engenhão	46,931
Ceará	Fortaleza	Castelão	60,326
Corinthians	São Paulo	Pacaembu	37,952
Cruzeiro	Belo Horizonte	Mineirão; Arena do Jacaré; Ipatingão; Parque do Sabiá	75,783; 25,000; 20,500; 50,000
Flamengo	Rio de Janeiro	Maracanã; Raulino de Oliveira; Engenhão	87,238; 21,000; 46,931
Fluminense	Rio de Janeiro	Maracanã; Engenhão	87,238; 46,931
Goiás	Goiânia	Serra Dourada	45,000
Grêmio	Porto Alegre	Olímpico	45,000
Grêmio Prudente	Presidente Prudente	Prudentão	44,414
Guarani	Campinas	Brinco de Ouro	40,988
Internacional	Porto Alegre	Beira-Rio	56,000
Palmeiras	São Paulo	Palestra Itália; Arena Barueri; Pacaembu	29,876; 16,417; 37,952
Santos	Santos	Vila Belmiro; Pacaembu	20,120; 37,952
São Paulo	São Paulo	Morumbi	67,428
Vasco da Gama	Rio de Janeiro	São Januário	20,150
Vitória	Salvador	Barradão	32,000

=== Personnel and kits ===
Team	Manager	Kit manufacturer	Main sponsor
Atlético Goianiense	Renê Simões	Super Bolla	Banco BMG
Atlético Mineiro	Dorival Júnior	Topper	Banco BMG
Atlético Paranaense	Sérgio Soares	Umbro	Philco
Avaí	Vagner Benazzi	Fanatic	Intelbras
Botafogo	Joel Santana	Fila	Neo Química Genéricos
Ceará	Dimas Filgueiras (caretaker)	Penalty	Neo Química Genéricos
Corinthians	Tite	Nike	Neo Química Genéricos
Cruzeiro	Cuca	Reebok	Banco BMG
Flamengo	Vanderlei Luxemburgo	Olympikus	Batavo
Fluminense	Muricy Ramalho	Adidas	Unimed
Goiás	Artur Neto	Lotto	Neo Química Genéricos
Grêmio	Renato Gaúcho	Puma	Banrisul
Grêmio Prudente	Fábio Giuntini	Kanxa	Grupo Localfrio
Guarani	Vágner Mancini	Lupo Sport	CPN Engenharia
Internacional	Celso Roth	Reebok	Banrisul
Palmeiras	Luiz Felipe Scolari	Adidas	Fiat
Santos	Marcelo Martelotte (caretaker)	Umbro	Seara Alimentos
São Paulo	Paulo César Carpegiani	Reebok	Banco BMG
Vasco da Gama	PC Gusmão	Penalty	Eletrobras
Vitória	Antônio Lopes	Penalty	Grupo OAS

=== Managerial changes ===
Team	Outgoing manager	Manner of departure	Date of vacancy	Position in table	Replaced by	Date of appointment
Vasco da Gama	Vágner Mancini	Sacked	25 March	Pre-season	Gaúcho (caretaker)	26 March
Goiás	Jorginho	Sacked	19 April	Pre-season	Émerson Leão	24 April
Flamengo	Andrade	Sacked	23 April	Pre-season	Rogério Lourenço	24 April
Palmeiras	Antônio Carlos Zago	Sacked	18 May	7th	Jorge Parraga (caretaker)	19 May
Vasco da Gama	Gaúcho (caretaker)	Replaced	18 May	16th	Celso Roth	18 May
Atlético Paranaense	Leandro Niehues	Sacked	25 May	17th	Leandro Niehues (caretaker)	25 May
Internacional	Jorge Fossati	Sacked	28 May	18th	Enderson Moreira (caretaker)	29 May
Atlético Paranaense	Leandro Niehues (caretaker)	Replaced	31 May	19th	Paulo César Carpegiani	31 May
Cruzeiro	Adílson Batista	Resigned	2 June	6th	Cuca	8 June
Atlético Goianiense	Geninho	Resigned	7 June	20th	Roberto Fernandes	14 June
Vasco da Gama	Celso Roth	Left to sign with Internacional	12 June	19th	PC Gusmão	13 June
Internacional	Enderson Moreira (caretaker)	Replaced	12 June	16th	Celso Roth	12 June
Ceará	PC Gusmão	Left to sign with Vasco da Gama	13 June	2nd	Estevam Soares	13 June
Palmeiras	Jorge Parraga (caretaker)	Replaced	13 June	10th	Luis Felipe Scolari	13 June
Avaí	Péricles Chamusca	Left to sign with Al-Arabi	1 July	12th	Antônio Lopes	5 July
Corinthians	Mano Menezes	Left to sign with Brazil	24 July	2nd	Adílson Batista	24 July
Atlético Goianiense	Roberto Fernandes	Sacked	30 July	20th	Renê Simões	1 August
São Paulo	Ricardo Gomes	Contract expired	5 August	9th	Sérgio Baresi	10 August
Grêmio	Silas	Sacked	8 August	18th	Renato Gaúcho	10 August
Ceará	Estevam Soares	Sacked	8 August	3rd	Mário Sérgio	9 August
Vitória	Ricardo Silva	Sacked	9 August	16th	Toninho Cecílio	9 August
Grêmio Prudente	Toninho Cecílio	Left to sign with Vitória	9 August	14th	Antônio Carlos Zago	17 August
Goiás	Émerson Leão	Sacked	27 August	20th	Jorginho	29 August
Flamengo	Rogério Lourenço	Sacked	27 August	10th	Silas	29 August
Ceará	Mário Sérgio	Sacked	8 September	11th	Dimas Filgueiras (caretaker)	10 September
Vitória	Toninho Cecílio	Sacked	8 September	15th	Ricardo Silva	9 September
Grêmio Prudente	Antônio Carlos Zago	Sacked	10 September	19th	Marcelo Rospide	10 September
Avaí	Antônio Lopes	Sacked	20 September	16th	Vagner Benazzi	10 October
Santos	Dorival Júnior	Sacked	21 September	6th	Marcelo Martelotte (caretaker)	21 September
Atlético Mineiro	Vanderlei Luxemburgo	Sacked	23 September	18th	Dorival Júnior	25 September
Grêmio Prudente	Marcelo Rospide	Resigned	27 September	20th	Fábio Giuntini	5 October
Atlético Paranaense	Paulo César Carpegiani	Left to sign with São Paulo	3 October	5th	Sérgio Soares	4 October
São Paulo	Sérgio Baresi	Replaced	3 October	11th	Paulo César Carpegiani	3 October
Flamengo	Silas	Sacked	4 October	15th	Vanderlei Luxemburgo	5 October
Vitória	Ricardo Silva	Sacked	7 October	14th	Antônio Lopes	7 October
Corinthians	Adílson Batista	Mutual consent	10 October	3rd	Tite	17 October
Goiás	Jorginho	Sacked	8 November	19th	Artur Neto	8 November

=== Foreign players ===
The match squad must have no more than 3 Foreign Players

Club	Player 1	Player 2	Player 3	Player 4	Dual Nationality Player	Former Players
Atlético Goianiense						
Atlético Mineiro	(Ecuador) Édison Méndez	(Ecuador) Jayro Campos	(Paraguay) Julio César Cáceres			(Paraguay) Pedro Benítez
Atlético Paranaense	(Argentina) Federico Nieto	(Ecuador) Joffre Guerrón	(Paraguay) Iván González			(Argentina) Javier Toledo (Colombia) Edwin Valencia
Avaí						
Botafogo	(Argentina) Germán Herrera	(Uruguay) Sebastián Abreu				
Ceará						
Corinthians	(Argentina) Matías Defederico					
Cruzeiro	(Argentina) Ernesto Farías	(Argentina) Walter Montillo				(Colombia) Javier Reina (Ecuador) Joffre Guerrón
Flamengo	(Chile) Claudio Maldonado	(Chile) Gonzalo Fierro	(Colombia) Cristian Martinez	(Serbia) Dejan Petković		
Fluminense	(Argentina) Darío Conca	(Argentina) Ezequiel González	(Colombia) Edwin Valencia	(Portugal) Deco	(Qatar) Emerson Sheik	
Goiás						
Grêmio						
Grêmio Prudente						
Guarani						
Internacional	(Argentina) Andrés D'Alessandro	(Argentina) Pablo Guiñazú	(Argentina) Roberto Abbondanzieri	(Uruguay) Bruno Silva	(Uruguay) Gonzalo Sorondo	
Palmeiras	(Chile) Jorge Valdivia					(Colombia) Pablo Armero
Santos					(Italy) Rodrigo Possebon	
São Paulo						
Vasco da Gama	(Paraguay) Julio Irrazábal					
Vitória	(Colombia) Julián Viáfara					

== League table ==
Pos	Team	Pld	W	D	L	GF	GA	GD	Pts	Qualification or relegation
1	Fluminense	38	20	11	7	62	36	+26	71	2011 Copa Libertadores Second Stage
2	Cruzeiro	38	20	9	9	53	38	+15	69	2011 Copa Libertadores Second Stage
3	Corinthians	38	19	11	8	65	41	+24	68	2011 Copa Libertadores First Stage
4	Grêmio	38	17	12	9	68	43	+25	63	2011 Copa Libertadores First Stage
5	Atlético Paranaense	38	17	9	12	43	45	−2	60	2011 Copa Sudamericana Second Stage
6	Botafogo	38	14	17	7	54	42	+12	59	2011 Copa Sudamericana Second Stage
7	Internacional	38	16	10	12	48	41	+7	58	2011 Copa Libertadores Second Stage (Note: Internacional qualified as the 2010 Copa Libertadores champion.)
8	Santos	38	15	11	12	63	50	+13	56	2011 Copa Libertadores Second Stage (Note: Santos qualified as the 2010 Copa do Brasil champion.)
9	São Paulo	38	15	10	13	54	54	0	55	2011 Copa Sudamericana Second Stage
10	Palmeiras	38	12	14	12	42	43	−1	50	2011 Copa Sudamericana Second Stage
11	Vasco da Gama	38	11	16	11	43	45	−2	49	2011 Copa Sudamericana Second Stage
12	Ceará	38	10	17	11	35	44	−9	47	2011 Copa Sudamericana Second Stage
13	Atlético Mineiro	38	13	6	19	52	64	−12	45	2011 Copa Sudamericana Second Stage
14	Flamengo	38	9	17	12	41	44	−3	44	2011 Copa Sudamericana Second Stage
15	Avaí	38	11	10	17	49	58	−9	43	
16	Atlético Goianiense	38	11	9	18	51	57	−6	42	
17	Vitória	38	9	15	14	42	48	−6	42	Relegation to Série B
18	Guarani	38	8	13	17	33	53	−20	37	Relegation to Série B
19	Goiás	38	8	9	21	41	68	−27	33	Relegation to Série B
20	Grêmio Prudente	38	7	10	21	39	64	−25	28 (Note: Grêmio Prudente was docked 3 points due to fielding a suspended player.)	Relegation to Série B

Rules for classification: 1st points; 2nd wins; 3rd goal difference; 4th goals scored; 5th head-to-head results; 6th least red cards received; 7th least yellow cards received; 8th draw
Notes:

Campeonato Brasileiro de Clubes da Série A
2010 champion

Third title

== Results ==
Home \ Away	ACG	CAM	CAP	AVA	BOT	CEA	COR	CRU	FLA	FLU	GOI	GRE	GPR	GUA	INT	PAL	SAN	SPA	VAS	VIT
Atlético Goianiense		2–3	1–2	2–2	0–2	1–1	3–1	2–1	0–1	2–1	1–3	0–0	3–0	1–1	2–2	3–0	1–2	1–1	2–0	4–1
Atlético Mineiro	3–2		3–1	2–0	0–2	0–1	2–1	0–1	4–1	1–3	3–1	1–2	1–0	3–1	1–2	1–2	2–2	2–3	2–1	2–3
Atlético Paranaense	2–1	2–1		1–0	3–2	2–1	1–1	0–2	1–0	2–2	2–1	1–1	2–1	2–2	1–0	1–0	2–0	1–1	0–0	1–0
Avaí	3–0	0–0	0–1		0–0	5–0	3–2	1–2	2–2	0–3	4–1	0–3	6–1	1–0	0–1	4–2	3–2	0–0	2–0	0–0
Botafogo	3–2	3–0	1–1	1–0		1–0	2–2	2–2	1–1	1–1	3–0	2–2	3–1	1–1	1–2	0–0	3–3	2–0	1–1	1–0
Ceará	0–0	0–0	1–1	2–0	2–2		0–0	1–0	2–2	1–0	1–1	2–1	2–2	2–0	1–0	0–0	2–1	2–0	0–2	1–0
Corinthians	3–4	1–0	2–1	4–0	1–1	2–2		1–0	1–0	1–0	5–1	0–1	3–0	3–1	2–0	1–0	4–2	3–0	2–0	2–1
Cruzeiro	3–0	3–4	0–0	2–2	1–0	2–0	1–0		1–0	1–0	1–0	2–2	0–0	4–2	1–0	2–1	0–0	0–2	3–1	0–1
Flamengo	2–0	0–0	0–1	1–1	1–0	1–0	1–1	1–2		3–3	1–2	1–1	3–1	2–1	3–0	1–3	0–0	1–1	0–0	2–2
Fluminense	1–0	5–1	3–1	1–0	0–0	3–1	1–2	1–0	2–1		1–1	2–0	1–1	1–0	3–0	1–1	0–3	2–2	1–0	2–1
Goiás	1–3	1–3	0–2	1–0	4–1	0–0	1–1	0–1	1–1	0–3		0–2	1–2	3–1	2–3	1–1	1–4	2–1	0–0	1–0
Grêmio	2–0	2–1	3–1	3–0	3–0	5–1	1–2	2–1	2–2	1–2	2–0		4–0	1–0	2–2	1–2	1–2	4–2	1–1	1–1
Grêmio Prudente	1–0	4–0	0–1	1–1	0–1	1–1	2–2	0–2	1–2	1–1	4–1	2–0		4–2	0–3	0–1	1–2	2–3	1–2	0–0
Guarani	0–1	0–0	1–0	4–1	1–1	1–1	0–0	2–2	2–1	2–1	1–0	0–3	1–0		0–3	0–0	0–0	0–0	1–0	1–1
Internacional	1–1	1–0	4–1	2–3	1–0	2–1	3–2	1–2	1–0	0–0	0–0	0–0	2–0	3–0		1–1	1–1	0–2	1–0	1–1
Palmeiras	0–3	0–2	2–0	4–1	2–2	1–1	1–1	2–3	0–1	1–2	3–2	4–2	0–0	1–0	2–0		2–1	0–2	0–0	1–0
Santos	4–2	2–0	2–0	2–1	0–1	1–1	2–3	4–1	0–0	0–1	2–0	0–0	2–3	3–1	1–0	1–1		1–0	4–0	1–1
São Paulo	2–1	4–0	2–1	1–2	1–2	2–1	0–2	2–2	2–0	1–4	0–3	3–1	1–1	2–1	1–3	1–0	4–3		0–0	2–0
Vasco da Gama	2–0	1–1	3–1	1–1	2–2	2–0	2–0	1–1	1–1	2–2	3–2	3–3	2–1	0–1	3–2	0–0	3–1	1–1		1–0
Vitória	0–0	4–3	1–0	3–0	1–3	0–0	1–1	0–1	1–1	1–2	2–2	0–3	2–0	1–1	0–0	1–1	4–2	3–2	4–2	

Legend: Blue = home team win; Yellow = draw; Red = away team win.

== Top goalscorers ==
Pos	Player	Nationality	Club	Goals
1	Jonas	Brazilian	Grêmio	23
2	Neymar	Brazilian	Santos	17
3	Bruno César	Brazilian	Corinthians	14
4	Elias	Brazilian	Atlético Goianiense	12
4	Obina	Brazilian	Atlético Mineiro	12
6	Sebastián Abreu	Uruguayan	Botafogo	11
6	André Lima	Brazilian	Grêmio	11
8	Alecsandro	Brazilian	Internacional	10
8	Diego Tardelli	Brazilian	Atlético Mineiro	10
8	Kléber	Brazilian	Palmeiras^{2}	10
8	Washington	Brazilian	Fluminense^{1}	10
8	Wesley Morais	Brazilian	Grêmio Prudente	10
8	Zé Eduardo	Brazilian	Santos	10

- ^{1} Two goals scored for São Paulo
- ^{2} Two goals scored for Cruzeiro
