= 2011 Campeonato Brasileiro Série A =

Campeonato Brasileiro Série A
- Season: 2011
- Champions: Corinthians; 5th Campeonato Brasileiro title 5th Brazilian title
- Relegated: Atlético Paranaense; Ceará; América-MG; Avaí
- Copa Libertadores: Santos (title holder); Corinthians; Fluminense; Flamengo; Internacional
- Copa Sudamericana: São Paulo; Figueirense; Coritiba; Botafogo; Palmeiras; Grêmio; Atlético Goianiense; Bahia
- Matches: 380
- Goals: 1,017 (2.68 per match)
- Top goalscorer: Borges (23 goals)
- Biggest home win: Cruzeiro 6-1 Atlético Mineiro (4 December); Coritiba 5–0 Botafogo (11 September); Cruzeiro 5–0 Avaí (13 August); Palmeiras 5–0 Avaí (19 June); Corinthians 5–0 São Paulo (16 June)
- Biggest away win: Atlético Mineiro 0–4 Internacional (30 June); Figueirense 0-4 Fluminense (20 November)
- Highest scoring: Santos 4–5 Flamengo (27 July); Fluminense 5-4 Grêmio (16 November)
- Longest winning run: 7 games — Corinthians (12 June – 28 July)
- Longest unbeaten run: 16 games — Flamengo (21 May – 18 August)
- Longest winless run: 12 games - Cruzeiro (28 August-current)
- Longest losing run: 5 games — Botafogo (5 November–current)
- Highest attendance: 63,871 — 2 October 2011 (São Paulo 1-2 Flamengo)
- Lowest attendance: 732 — 31 July 2011 (América (MG) 1-3 Coritiba)
- Average attendance: 14,600

The 2011 Campeonato Brasileiro Série A (officially the Brasileirão Petrobras 2011 for sponsorship reasons) was the 55th edition of the Campeonato Brasileiro Série A, the top-level of professional football in Brazil. It began on 21 May and was scheduled to end on 4 December. Fluminense comes in as the defending champion having won the 2010 season.

== Format ==
For the ninth consecutive season, the tournament will be played in a double round-robin system. The team with most points will be declared the champion. The bottom-four teams will be relegated for the following season.

=== International qualification ===
The Série A will serve as a qualifier to CONMEBOL's 2012 international tournaments. The top-two teams in the standings will qualify to the Second Stage of the 2012 Copa Libertadores, while the next third and fourth place in the standings will qualify to the First Stage. The next eight best teams in the standings will earn berths to the Second Stage of the 2012 Copa Sudamericana.

== Team information ==
Vitória, Guarani, Goiás and Grêmio Prudente were relegated to the 2011 Campeonato Brasileiro Série B after finishing in the bottom four spots of the table at the end of the 2010 season. Goiás were relegated to the Série B after eleven seasons of continuous membership in the top football league of Brazil, while Vitória ended a three-year tenure in Série A and Grêmio Prudente ended a two-year appearance. Guarani made their immediate return to the second level.

The four relegated teams were replaced by four 2010 Série B sides. Champions Coritiba, made their immediate return to Série A, runners-up Figueirense, who returned after two years, third placed Bahia, who returned to the top flight after seven seasons at lower levels, and fourth placed América Mineiro, who returned to the league for the first time in eight years.

Locations of the 2011 Série A teams

| Team | Home city | Stadium | Capacity |
|---|---|---|---|
| América (MG) | Belo Horizonte | Arena do Jacaré; Parque do Sabiá (3 matches); Morenão (one match) | 18,000; 50,000; 45,000 |
| Atlético Goianiense | Goiânia | Serra Dourada | 50,049 |
| Atlético Mineiro | Belo Horizonte | Arena do Jacaré; Ipatingão (4 matches) | 18,000; 20,500 |
| Atlético Paranaense | Curitiba | Arena da Baixada | 28,237 |
| Avaí | Florianópolis | Ressacada | 19,000 |
| Bahia | Salvador | Pituaçu | 31,677 |
| Botafogo | Rio de Janeiro | Engenhão; São Januário (2 matches); Raulino de Oliveira (one match) | 44,000; 22,150; 20,255 |
| Ceará | Fortaleza | Presidente Vargas | 20,600 |
| Corinthians | São Paulo | Pacaembu; Fonte Luminosa (one match) | 37,952; 20,287 |
| Coritiba | Curitiba | Couto Pereira | 38,000 |
| Cruzeiro | Belo Horizonte | Arena do Jacaré; Parque do Sabiá (3 matches); Ipatingão (one match) | 18,000; 50,000; 20,500 |
| Figueirense | Florianópolis | Orlando Scarpelli | 19,069 |
| Flamengo | Rio de Janeiro | Engenhão; Moacyrzão (4 matches) | 44,000; 15,000 |
| Fluminense | Rio de Janeiro | Engenhão; Raulino de Oliveira (3 matches); São Januário (one match) | 44,000; 20,255; 22,150 |
| Grêmio | Porto Alegre | Olímpico | 45,000 |
| Internacional | Porto Alegre | Beira-Rio | 56,000 |
| Palmeiras | São Paulo | Canindé (10 matches); Pacaembu (6 matches); Prudentão (one match); Teixeirão (one match); Arena Barueri (one match) | 21,004; 37,952; 44,414; 32,936; 31,452 |
| Santos | Santos | Vila Belmiro; Pacaembu (4 matches) | 21,256; 37,952 |
| São Paulo | São Paulo | Morumbi; Arena Barueri (one match); Vail Chaves (one match) | 67,428; 31,452; 19,900 |
| Vasco da Gama | Rio de Janeiro | São Januário; Engenhão (3 matches) | 22,150; 44,000 |

=== Personnel and kits ===
Note: Flags indicate national team as has been defined under FIFA eligibility rules. Players may hold more than one non-FIFA nationality.

| Team | Manager^{1} | Captain | Kit manufacturer | Shirt main sponsor |
|---|---|---|---|---|
| América (MG) | Givanildo Oliveira | (Brazil) Gabriel Santos | Kanxa | Fiat |
| Atlético Goianiense | Hélio dos Anjos | (Brazil) Márcio | Super Bolla | Cimento Tocantins |
| Atlético Mineiro | Cuca | (Brazil) Réver | Topper | Banco BMG |
| Atlético Paranaense | Antônio Lopes | (Brazil) Paulo Baier | Umbro | Philco |
| Avaí | Toninho Cecílio | (Brazil) William | Fanatic | Intelbras |
| Bahia | Joel Santana | (Brazil) Titi | Lotto | Grupo OAS |
| Botafogo | Caio Júnior | (Uruguay) Sebastián Abreu | Fila | Joao Fortes Engenharia |
| Ceará | Dimas Filgueiras | (Brazil) Fabrício | Penalty | Neo Química Genéricos |
| Corinthians | Tite | (Brazil) Alessandro | Nike | Neo Química Genéricos |
| Coritiba | Marcelo Oliveira | (Brazil) Pereira | Lotto | Banco BMG |
| Cruzeiro | Vágner Mancini | (Brazil) Fábio | Reebok | Banco BMG |
| Figueirense | Jorginho | (Brazil) João Paulo | Fila | Taschibra |
| Flamengo | Vanderlei Luxemburgo | (Brazil) Ronaldinho | Olympikus | Procter & Gamble |
| Fluminense | Abel Braga | (Brazil) Fred | Adidas | Unimed |
| Grêmio | Celso Roth | (Brazil) Fábio Rochemback | Topper | Banrisul |
| Internacional | Dorival Júnior | (Brazil) Bolívar | Reebok | Banrisul |
| Palmeiras | Luiz Felipe Scolari | (Brazil) Marcos Assunção | Adidas | Fiat |
| Santos | Muricy Ramalho | (Brazil) Edu Dracena | Umbro | Banco BMG |
| São Paulo | Émerson Leão | (Brazil) Rogério Ceni | Reebok | Banco BMG |
| Vasco da Gama | Ricardo Gomes/Cristóvão Borges | (Brazil) Juninho Pernambucano | Penalty | Eletrobras |

- ^{1} According to current revision League managers

=== Managerial changes ===
| Team | Outgoing manager | Manner of departure | Date of vacancy | Position in table | Replaced by | Date of appointment |
|---|---|---|---|---|---|---|
| Santos | Adílson Batista | Sacked | 27 February | Pre-season | Muricy Ramalho | 8 April |
| Fluminense | Muricy Ramalho | Resigned | 13 March | Pre-season | Abel Braga | 8 June |
| Ceará | Dimas Filgueiras | Contract ended | 31 March | Pre-season | Vágner Mancini | 1 April |
| Atlético Goianiense | Renê Simões | Sacked | 1 April | Pre-season | Paulo César Gusmão | 3 April |
| Atlético Paranaense | Geninho | Sacked | 4 April | Pre-season | Adílson Batista | 5 April |
| Internacional | Celso Roth | Sacked | 8 April | Pre-season | Falcão | 14 April |
| Bahia | Vágner Benazzi | Sacked | 10 April | Pre-season | Renê Simões | 14 April |
| Avaí | Silas | Left to sign with Al-Arabi | 8 June | 20th | Alexandre Gallo | 14 June |
| Cruzeiro | Cuca | Sacked | 19 June | 18th | Joel Santana | 20 June |
| Grêmio | Renato Gaúcho | Sacked | 30 June | 12th | Júlio Camargo | 2 July |
| Atlético Paranaense | Adílson Batista | Sacked | 2 July | 20th | Renato Gaúcho | 4 July |
| São Paulo | Paulo César Carpegiani | Sacked | 7 July | 3rd | Adílson Batista | 16 July |
| América (MG) | Mauro Fernandes | Sacked | 11 July | 18th | Antônio Lopes | 12 July |
| Internacional | Falcão | Sacked | 18 July | 8th | Dorival Júnior | 12 August |
| Atlético Goianiense | Paulo César Gusmão | Personal problems | 21 July | 17th | Hélio dos Anjos | 12 August |
| América (MG) | Antônio Lopes | Resigned | 1 August | 20th | Givanildo Oliveira | 2 August |
| Grêmio | Júlio Camargo | Sacked | 4 August | 15th | Celso Roth | 4 August |
| Atlético Mineiro | Dorival Júnior | Sacked | 7 August | 14th | Cuca | 8 August |
| Avaí | Alexandre Gallo | Sacked | 18 August | 19th | Toninho Cecílio | 22 August |
| Vasco da Gama | Ricardo Gomes | Health problems (temporarily) | 28 August | 4th | Cristóvão Borges (caretaker) | 29 August |
| Atlético Paranaense | Renato Gaúcho | Resigned | 1 September | 19th | Antônio Lopes | 1 September |
| Cruzeiro | Joel Santana | Sacked | 2 September | 11th | Emerson Ávila | 2 September |
| Bahia | René Simões | Sacked | 2 September | 16th | Joel Santana | 4 September |
| Ceará | Vágner Mancini | Sacked | 11 September | 15th | Estevam Soares | 14 September |
| Cruzeiro | Emerson Ávila | Sacked | 26 September | 16th | Vágner Mancini | 26 September |
| São Paulo | Adílson Batista | Sacked | 16 October | 6th | Émerson Leão | 24 October |
| Ceará | Estevam Soares | Sacked | 23 October | 17th | Dimas Filgueiras | 24 October |
| Avaí | Toninho Cecílio | Sacked | 14 November | 20th | Edson Neguinho (caretaker) | 14 November |
| Botafogo | Caio Júnior | Sacked | 17 November | 5th | Flavio Tenius (caretaker) | 17 November |

== League table ==
| Pos | Team | Pld | W | D | L | GF | GA | GD | Pts | Qualification or relegation |
|---|---|---|---|---|---|---|---|---|---|---|
| 1 | Corinthians (C) | 38 | 21 | 8 | 9 | 53 | 36 | +17 | 71 | 2012 Copa Libertadores Second Stage |
| 2 | Vasco da Gama | 38 | 19 | 12 | 7 | 57 | 40 | +17 | 69 | 2012 Copa Libertadores Second Stage (Note: Vasco da Gama is qualified for the second stage of the 2012 Copa Libertadores as the 2011 Copa do Brasil champion.) |
| 3 | Fluminense | 38 | 20 | 3 | 15 | 60 | 51 | +9 | 63 | 2012 Copa Libertadores Second Stage |
| 4 | Flamengo | 38 | 15 | 16 | 7 | 59 | 47 | +12 | 61 | 2012 Copa Libertadores First Stage |
| 5 | Internacional | 38 | 16 | 12 | 10 | 57 | 43 | +14 | 60 | 2012 Copa Libertadores First Stage |
| 6 | São Paulo | 38 | 16 | 11 | 11 | 57 | 46 | +11 | 59 | 2012 Copa Sudamericana Second Stage |
| 7 | Figueirense | 38 | 15 | 13 | 10 | 46 | 45 | +1 | 58 | 2012 Copa Sudamericana Second Stage |
| 8 | Coritiba | 38 | 16 | 9 | 13 | 57 | 41 | +16 | 57 | 2012 Copa Sudamericana Second Stage |
| 9 | Botafogo | 38 | 16 | 8 | 14 | 52 | 49 | +3 | 56 | 2012 Copa Sudamericana Second Stage |
| 10 | Santos | 38 | 15 | 8 | 15 | 55 | 55 | 0 | 53 | 2012 Copa Libertadores Second Stage (Note: Santos is qualified for the second stage of the 2012 Copa Libertadores as the 2011 Copa Libertadores champion.) |
| 11 | Palmeiras | 38 | 11 | 17 | 10 | 43 | 39 | +4 | 50 | 2012 Copa Sudamericana Second Stage |
| 12 | Grêmio | 38 | 13 | 9 | 16 | 49 | 57 | −8 | 48 | 2012 Copa Sudamericana Second Stage |
| 13 | Atlético Goianiense | 38 | 12 | 12 | 14 | 50 | 45 | +5 | 48 | 2012 Copa Sudamericana Second Stage |
| 14 | Bahia | 38 | 11 | 13 | 14 | 43 | 49 | −6 | 46 | 2012 Copa Sudamericana Second Stage |
| 15 | Atlético Mineiro | 38 | 13 | 6 | 19 | 50 | 60 | −10 | 45 | |
| 16 | Cruzeiro | 38 | 11 | 10 | 17 | 48 | 51 | −3 | 43 | |
| 17 | Atlético Paranaense | 38 | 10 | 11 | 17 | 38 | 55 | −17 | 41 | Relegation to Série B |
| 18 | Ceará | 38 | 10 | 9 | 19 | 47 | 64 | −17 | 39 | Relegation to Série B |
| 19 | América Mineiro | 38 | 8 | 13 | 17 | 51 | 69 | −18 | 37 | Relegation to Série B |
| 20 | Avaí | 38 | 7 | 10 | 21 | 45 | 75 | −30 | 31 | Relegation to Série B |

Rules for classification: 1st points; 2nd wins; 3rd goal difference; 4th goals scored; 5th head-to-head results; 6th least red cards received; 7th least yellow cards received; 8th draw
(C) Champions

== Results ==
| Home \ Away | AMG | ACG | CAM | CAP | AVA | BAH | BOT | CEA | COR | CTB | CRU | FIG | FLA | FLU | GRE | INT | PAL | SAN | SPA | VAS |
|---|---|---|---|---|---|---|---|---|---|---|---|---|---|---|---|---|---|---|---|---|
| América Mineiro | | 1–2 | 0–0 | 2–1 | 2–2 | 2–1 | 2–1 | 4–1 | 2–1 | 1–3 | 1–1 | 0–0 | 2–3 | 3–0 | 2–2 | 2–4 | 1–1 | 1–2 | 1–1 | 4–1 |
| Atlético Goianiense | 5–1 | | 1–0 | 0–3 | 0–1 | 0–1 | 2–0 | 4–1 | 0–1 | 3–1 | 2–0 | 1–1 | 0–0 | 0–1 | 1–0 | 0–1 | 1–1 | 2–0 | 3–0 | 0–1 |
| Atlético Mineiro | 2–0 | 2–2 | | 3–0 | 2–0 | 2–0 | 4–0 | 1–1 | 2–3 | 2–1 | 1–2 | 1–2 | 1–1 | 1–0 | 2–0 | 0–4 | 2–1 | 2–1 | 0–1 | 1–2 |
| Atlético Paranaense | 2–2 | 2–1 | 0–1 | | 0–0 | 0–2 | 2–1 | 1–0 | 1–1 | 1–0 | 2–1 | 0–0 | 1–1 | 1–1 | 0–1 | 2–0 | 2–2 | 3–2 | 1–0 | 2–2 |
| Avaí | 2–2 | 2–2 | 1–3 | 3–0 | | 2–2 | 3–2 | 1–2 | 3–2 | 0–0 | 0–0 | 1–1 | 3–2 | 0–1 | 1–2 | 1–3 (Note: These matches, previously scheduled for 28 July (v. Corinthians), and 24 July (v. Avaí) were delayed to 14 and 21 July, respectively, because of the Audi Cup 2011.) | 1–1 | 1–2 | 1–2 | 0–2 |
| Bahia | 0–0 | 2–1 | 1–1 | 1–0 | 3–2 | | 1–1 | 2–1 | 0–1 | 0–0 | 0–0 | 3–1 | 3–3 | 3–0 | 1–2 | 1–1 | 0–2 | 1–2 | 4–3 | 0–2 |
| Botafogo | 4–2 | 1–1 | 3–1 | 2–0 | 2–1 | 2–2 | | 4–0 | 0–2 (Note: These matches previously scheduled for 17 July were postponed to 20 July, because of the Brazil v Paraguay, by 2011 Copa América.) | 3–1 | 1–0 | 0–1 | 1–1 | 1–1 | 2–1 | 1–2 | 3–1 | 1–0 | 2–2 | 4–0 |
| Ceará | 4–0 | 1–1 | 3–0 | 2–1 | 0–3 | 3–0 | 2–2 | | 0–1 | 3–2 | 2–2 | 1–1 | 0–1 | 1–2 | 3–0 | 1–1 | 2–0 | 2–3 | 0–2 | 1–3 |
| Corinthians | 2–1 | 3–0 | 2–1 | 2–1 | 2–1 | 1–0 | 0–2 | 2–2 | | 2–1 | 0–1 | 0–2 | 2–1 | 2–0 | 3–2 | 1–0 | 0–0 | 1–3 | 5–0 | 2–1 |
| Coritiba | 3–1 | 0–1 | 3–0 | 1–1 | 1–0 | 0–0 | 5–0 | 3–1 | 1–0 | | 2–1 | 3–0 | 2–0 | 3–1 | 2–0 | 1–1 | 1–1 | 1–0 | 3–4 | 5–1 |
| Cruzeiro | 0–0 | 3–2 | 6–1 | 1–1 | 5–0 | 2–1 | 0–1 | 1–0 | 0–1 | 2–1 | | 2–4 | 0–1 | 1–2 | 2–0 | 1–0 | 1–1 | 1–1 | 3–3 | 0–3 |
| Figueirense | 2–1 | 2–0 | 2–1 | 2–0 | 2–3 | 2–1 | 2–0 | 1–1 | 0–1 | 0–0 | 1–0 | | 2–2 | 0–4 | 0–0 | 1–1 | 0–1 | 2–1 | 1–2 | 1–1 |
| Flamengo | 2–1 | 1–4 | 4–1 | 1–2 | 4–0 | 1–3 | 0–0 | 1–1 | 1–1 | 1–0 | 5–1 | 0–0 | | 3–2 | 2–0 | 1–0 | 1–1 | 1–1 | 1–0 | 0–0 |
| Fluminense | 1–2 | 3–2 | 0–2 | 3–1 | 3–1 | 0–1 | 1–2 | 4–0 | 1–0 | 3–1 | 2–1 | 3–0 | 0–1 | | 5–4 | 2–0 | 1–0 | 3–2 | 0–2 | 1–2 |
| Grêmio | 1–1 | 2–2 | 2–2 | 4–0 | 2–2 | 2–0 | 0–1 | 1–3 | 1–2 | 2–0 | 2–0 | 1–3 | 4–2 | 2–1 | | 2–1 | 2–2 | 1–0 (Note: These matches previously scheduled for 18 June (v. Corinthians), 26 June (v. América), 7 July (v. Fluminense), 24 July (v. Grêmio), and 4 September (v. Botafogo) were postponed to 10 August 2 July, 24 August 5 and 19 October, respectively, because of the 2011 Copa Libertadores Finals, 2011 Copa América, 2011 FIFA U-20 World Cup, and friendly Brazil v Ghana.) | 1–0 | 1–1 |
| Internacional | 4–2 | 0–0 | 2–1 | 1–0 | 4–2 | 1–0 | 1–0 | 0–1 | 1–1 | 1–1 | 3–2 | 4–1 | 2–2 | 1–2 | 1–0 | | 2–2 | 3–3 | 0–3 | 3–0 |
| Palmeiras | 1–1 | 2–0 | 3–2 | 1–0 | 5–0 | 1–1 | 1–0 | 1–0 | 2–1 | 0–2 | 1–1 | 1–2 | 0–0 | 1–2 | 0–0 | 0–3 | | 3–0 | 1–0 | 1–1 |
| Santos | 1–0 | 1–1 | 2–1 | 4–1 | 3–1 | 1–1 | 2–0 | 1–0 | 0–0 | 2–3 | 1–0 | 2–3 | 4–5 | 2–1 | 0–1 | 1–1 | 1–0 | | 1–1 | 2–0 |
| São Paulo | 3–1 | 2–2 | 2–1 | 2–2 | 2–0 | 3–0 | 0–2 | 4–0 | 0–0 | 0–0 | 2–1 | 1–0 | 1–2 | 1–2 | 3–1 | 0–0 | 1–1 | 4–1 | | 0–2 |
| Vasco da Gama | 3–0 | 1–1 | 2–0 | 2–1 | 2–0 | 1–1 | 2–0 | 3–1 | 2–2 | 2–0 | 0–3 | 1–1 | 1–1 | 1–1 | 4–0 | 2–0 | 1–0 | 2–0 | 0–0 | |

Updated to match(es) played on 4 December 2011. Source:
Legend: Blue = home team win; Yellow = draw; Red = away team win.

== Top goalscorers ==
| Rank | Name | Nationality | Club | Goals |
|---|---|---|---|---|
| 1 | Borges | Brazilian | Santos | 23 |
| 2 | Fred | Brazilian | Fluminense | 22 |
| 3 | Deivid | Brazilian | Flamengo | 15 |
| 4 | Leandro Damião | Brazilian | Internacional | 14 |
| 4 | Ronaldinho | Brazilian | Flamengo | 14 |
| 4 | William | Brazilian | Avaí | 14 |
| 7 | Sebastián Abreu | Uruguayan | Botafogo | 13 |
| 7 | Kempes | Brazilian | América-MG | 13 |
| 7 | Neymar | Brazilian | Santos | 13 |
| 10 | Anselmo | Brazilian | Atlético Goianiense | 12 |
| 10 | Liédson | Portuguese | Corinthians | 12 |
| 10 | Walter Montillo | Argentine | Cruzeiro | 12 |
| 10 | Thiago Neves | Brazilian | Flamengo | 12 |
