= 1991–92 Qatar Stars League =

28th season of top-tier football league in Qatar

Qatar Stars League
- Season: 1991–92
- Champions: Al-Ittihad
- Asian Club Championship: Al-Ittihad
- Top goalscorer: (Algeria) Rabah Madjer (Qatar) Mubarak Mustafa (12 goals)

Statistics of Qatar Stars League for the 1991–92 season.

== Overview ==
It was contested by 9 teams, and Al-Ittihad won the league.

== Personnel ==
Team	Head coach
Al Ahli	(Brazil) Paulo Massa
Al-Arabi	(Brazil) Oswaldo de Oliveira
Al-Ittihad	(Bosnia and Herzegovina) Džemal Hadžiabdić
Al-Rayyan	(Brazil) René Simões
Al Sadd	(Qatar) Obeid Jumaa
Al-Shamal	
Al-Taawon	(Hungary) Antal Szentmihályi
Al-Wakrah	(Romania) Costică Ștefănescu
Qatar SC	(Germany) Uli Maslo

== Foreign players ==
Team	Player 1	Player 2	Player 3	Former players
Al Ahli				
Al-Arabi	(Brazil) Marquinho Carioca	(Iran) Ebrahim Ghasempour		
Al-Ittihad	(Iran) Mohsen Ashouri	(Iran) Morteza Kermani Moghaddam		
Al-Rayyan				
Al Sadd	(Iran) Hamid Derakhshan			
Al-Shamal				
Al-Taawon				
Al-Wakrah	(Romania) Haralambie Puiu Antohi			
Qatar SC	(Algeria) Rabah Madjer	(Brazil) Luisinho Lemos	(Iran) Abdolreza Barzegari	

== League standings ==
Pos	Team	Pld	W	D	L	GF	GA	GD	Pts
1	Al-Ittihad	16	10	5	1	22	10	+12	25
2	Qatar SC	16	10	4	2	29	6	+23	24
3	Al Sadd	16	9	4	3	22	14	+8	22
4	Al-Arabi	16	9	3	4	25	18	+7	21
5	Al-Rayyan	16	7	4	5	24	12	+12	18
6	Al Ahli	16	5	2	9	20	25	−5	12
7	Al-Wakrah	16	4	3	9	15	29	−14	11
8	Al-Taawon	16	2	2	12	14	33	−19	6
9	Al-Shamal	16	2	1	13	17	41	−24	5

Source: RSSSF
