= 2009 Campeonato Brasileiro Série A =

Campeonato Brasileiro Série A
- Season: 2009
- Champions: Flamengo (5th title)
- Relegated: Coritiba; Santo André; Náutico; Sport
- Copa Libertadores: Flamengo; Internacional; São Paulo; Cruzeiro
- Copa Sudamericana: Palmeiras; Avaí; Atlético Mineiro; Grêmio; Goiás; Grêmio Barueri; Santos; Vitória
- Matches: 380
- Goals: 1,094 (2.88 per match)
- Top goalscorer: Adriano; Diego Tardelli (19 goals each)
- Biggest home win: Coritiba 5–0 Flamengo
- Biggest away win: Atlético Paranaense 0–4 Atlético Mineiro
- Highest scoring: Vitória 6–2 Santos
- Highest attendance: 78.639 (Flamengo 2-1 Grêmio)
- Average attendance: 17.807

The 2009 Campeonato Brasileiro Série A was the 53rd edition of the Campeonato Brasileiro Série A, the top-level of professional football in Brazil. It was contested by 20 clubs starting on 9 May and ending on 6 December. The 2009 edition was won by Flamengo.

The first goal of the tournament was scored by Igor on the 13th minute of the match between his team, Sport and Grêmio Barueri, which ended in a 1–1 draw. Holders São Paulo had a bad start losing to Fluminense 1–0.

Internacional led the tournament from round 2 to 6, when Atlético Mineiro took the lead. In the 9th round, Internacional regained the lead but one round later Atlético Mineiro managed to come back to the top of the table after defeating their city rivals Cruzeiro 3–0. The club from Belo Horizonte held the lead until round 15, when Palmeiras reached the top. In the middle of the championship, Flamengo was only on the 10th position.

Palmeiras managed to stay in the top until round 34, when they lost 1–0 against Fluminense, which was struggling to avoid relegation. Four days earlier, São Paulo had tied 1–1 with Grêmio after having three players sent off.

Round 37 saw several changes in the standings. São Paulo could have won their seventh title, and fourth in a row, if they had defeated Goiás, exactly as it had happened the season prior. However, this time Goiás won 4–2, sending São Paulo from the top of the table to fourth place. Flamengo defeated Corinthians and took the lead for the first time in the tournament. Internacional advanced to second place and in the last round, needed both a win against Santo André and for their city rivals Grêmio to tie or defeat Flamengo in the last match. Despite rumors that Grêmio would not play as hard as they could, Flamengo had to come back from a 0–1 score to win the tournament. Internacional's 4–1 win was not enough.

Palmeiras also came to the last round of the championship with chances to end in the top position. For that, they had to beat Botafogo, which would be relegated if did not win the last match. The result was tragic for Palmeiras: 0–2 defeat that combined with Cruzeiro 2–1 over Santos left the team outside the top four and, therefore, out of 2010 Copa Libertadores. Botafogo, together with city rivals Fluminense, managed to avoid relegation. After spending 37 rounds in relegation zone, Fluminense, which managed to leave the bottom four positions one match earlier, held a 1–1 draw away against Coritiba and sent the team from Curitiba to Série B exactly when the club was celebrating 100 years of foundation.

The 2009 edition of the Brasileirão marked the professional debut of players such as Neymar.

== Format ==
For the seventh consecutive season, the tournament will be played in a double round-robin system. The team with most points will be declared the champion. The bottom-four teams will be relegated for the following season.

=== International qualification ===
The Série A will serve as a qualifier to CONMEBOL's 2010 international tournaments. The top-three teams in the standings will qualify to the Second Stage of the 2010 Copa Libertadores, while the fourth place team will qualify to the First Stage. The next eight-best teams will qualify to the 2010 Copa Sudamericana. Should the winner of the 2009 Copa do Brasil finish better than 13th, the next best team(s) will earn the berth(s) it would have qualified for in the league standings.

== Team information ==
Like in 2008, twenty teams will compete in this year's Série A. Defending champion São Paulo will have a chance to extend two records in Brazilian football should they win this year: first club to win four titles in a row, and first club to win seven titles overall. Of the four teams promoted from the 2008 Série B, one is new to the Série A. Grêmio Barueri will be competing in the Série A for the first time since turning professional eight years ago. Four-time champion Corinthians returns after spending a single season in the Série B. The other teams promoted are Santo André (first return since 1984) and Avaí (first return since 1979). As is becoming common in Brazilian football, one of the country's most important clubs has been relegated after the previous season. For 2009, Vasco da Gama, champion in 1974, 1989, 1997 and 2000, will play the 2009 season in the Série B.

Locations of the 2009 Série A teams

Team	City	Stadium
Atlético Mineiro	Belo Horizonte	Mineirão
Atlético Paranaense	Curitiba	Arena da Baixada
Avaí	Florianópolis	Ressacada
Botafogo	Rio de Janeiro	Engenhão
Corinthians	São Paulo	Pacaembu
Coritiba	Curitiba	Couto Pereira
Cruzeiro	Belo Horizonte	Mineirão
Flamengo	Rio de Janeiro	Maracanã
Fluminense	Rio de Janeiro	Maracanã
Goiás	Goiânia	Serra Dourada
Grêmio	Porto Alegre	Olímpico
Grêmio Barueri	Barueri	Arena Barueri
Internacional	Porto Alegre	Beira-Rio
Náutico	Recife	Aflitos
Palmeiras	São Paulo	Palestra Itália
Santo André	Santo André	Bruno José Daniel
Santos	Santos	Vila Belmiro
São Paulo	São Paulo	Morumbi
Sport	Recife	Ilha do Retiro
Vitória	Salvador	Barradão

=== Personnel and kits ===
Team	Manager	Kit manufacturer	Main sponsor
Atlético Mineiro	Celso Roth	Lotto	None
Atlético Paranaense	Antônio Lopes	Umbro	Philco
Avaí	Silas	Fanatic	Pauta Computadores
Botafogo	Estevam Soares	Fila	Liquigás
Corinthians	Mano Menezes	Penalty	Batavo
Coritiba	Ney Franco	Lotto	Banco BMG
Cruzeiro	Adílson Batista	Reebok	Banco Bonsucesso
Flamengo	Andrade	Olympikus	ALE Combustíveis
Fluminense	Cuca	Adidas	Unimed
Goiás	Hélio dos Anjos	Lotto	Neo Química Genéricos
Grêmio	Marcelo Rospide (caretaker)	Puma	Banrisul
Grêmio Barueri	Luis Carlos Goiano	Kanxa	Embratel
Internacional	Mario Sérgio	Reebok	Banrisul
Náutico	Geninho	Lupo Sport	Hipercard
Palmeiras	Muricy Ramalho	Adidas	Samsung
Santo André	Sergio Soares	Lotto	Netshoes.com.br
Santos	Vanderlei Luxemburgo	Umbro	Semp Toshiba
São Paulo	Ricardo Gomes	Reebok	LG
Sport	Givanildo Oliveira	Lotto	Cimento Nassau
Vitória	Vagner Mancini	Champs	Megaware Computadores

=== Managerial changes ===
Team	Outgoing	Manner	Date	Last match	Round	Table	Incoming
Grêmio	(Brazil) Marcelo Rospide^{1}	Replaced	16 May 2009	Atlético Mineiro 2–1 Grêmio	2	14th	(Brazil) Paulo Autuori
Sport	(Brazil) Nelsinho Baptista	Resigned	25 May 2009	Sport 2–3 Atlético Mineiro	3	18th	(Brazil) Émerson Leão
Atlético Paranaense	(Brazil) Geninho	Resigned	7 June 2009	Atlético Paranaense 0–4 Atlético Mineiro	5	20th	(Brazil) Waldemar Lemos
Náutico	(Brazil) Waldemar Lemos	Left to sign with Atlético Paranaense	9 June 2009	Grêmio 3–0 Náutico	5	5th	(Brazil) Márcio Bittencourt
São Paulo	(Brazil) Muricy Ramalho	Sacked	19 June 2009	São Paulo 0–2 Cruzeiro^{2}	6	12th	(Brazil) Ricardo Gomes
Palmeiras	(Brazil) Wanderley Luxemburgo	Sacked	26 June 2009	Atlético Paranaense 2–2 Palmeiras	7	4th	(Brazil) Muricy Ramalho^{3}
Náutico	(Brazil) Márcio Bittencourt	Resigned	12 July 2009	Palmeiras 4–1 Náutico	10	19th	(Brazil) Geninho
Santos	(Brazil) Vágner Mancini	Sacked	13 July 2009	Vitória 6–2 Santos	10	11th	(Brazil) Wanderley Luxemburgo
Fluminense	(Brazil) Carlos Alberto Parreira	Sacked	13 July 2009	Fluminense 0–1 Santo André	10	18th	(Brazil) Renato Gaúcho
Flamengo	(Brazil) Cuca	Sacked	23 July 2009	Flamengo 1–1 Grêmio Barueri	13	11th	(Brazil) Andrade
Sport	(Brazil) Émerson Leão	Sacked	27 July 2009	Sport 3–3 Náutico	14	17th	(Brazil) Pericles Chamusca
Santo André	(Brazil) Sérgio Guedes	Resigned	27 July 2009	Grêmio 3–2 Santo André	14	13th	(Brazil) Alexandre Gallo
Atlético Paranaense	(Brazil) Waldemar Lemos	Resigned	29 July 2009	Goiás 3–0 Atlético Paranaense	15	18th	(Brazil) Antônio Lopes
Coritiba	(Brazil) Renê Simões	Sacked	9 August 2009	Coritiba 1–3 Cruzeiro	18	18th	(Brazil) Ney Franco
Botafogo	(Brazil) Ney Franco	Sacked	10 August 2009	Botafogo 0–1 Atlético Paranaense	18	15th	(Brazil) Estevam Soares
Vitória	(Brazil) Paulo César Carpegiani	Sacked	10 August 2009	Vitória 2–2 Fluminense	18	10th	(Brazil) Vágner Mancini
Grêmio Barueri	(Brazil) Estevam Soares	Left to sign with Botafogo	11 August 2009	Grêmio Barueri 1–0 Grêmio	18	6th	(Brazil) Diego Cerri
Fluminense	(Brazil) Renato Gaúcho	Sacked	1 September 2009	Santos 2–0 Fluminense	22	20th	(Brazil) Cuca
Internacional	(Brazil) Tite	Sacked	5 October 2009	Coritiba 2–0 Internacional	27	5th	(Brazil) Mário Sérgio

^{1} Marcelo Rospide was interim manager since Celso Roth was sacked after Grêmio's elimination in the Campeonato Gaúcho 2009 on 5 April.
^{2} Match played for the 2009 Copa Libertadores.
^{3} Interim coach Jorginho Cantinflas managed the team for 7 matches, until the 14th round.

== Standings ==
Pos	Team	Pld	W	D	L	GF	GA	GD	Pts	Qualification or relegation
1	Flamengo (C)	38	19	10	9	58	44	+14	67	2010 Copa Libertadores Second Stage
2	Internacional	38	19	8	11	65	44	+21	65	2010 Copa Libertadores Second Stage
3	São Paulo	38	18	11	9	57	42	+15	65	2010 Copa Libertadores Second Stage
4	Cruzeiro	38	18	8	12	58	53	+5	62	2010 Copa Libertadores First Stage
5	Palmeiras	38	17	11	10	58	45	+13	62	2010 Copa Sudamericana Second Stage
6	Avaí	38	15	12	11	61	52	+9	57	2010 Copa Sudamericana Second Stage
7	Atlético Mineiro	38	16	8	14	55	56	−1	56	2010 Copa Sudamericana Second Stage
8	Grêmio	38	15	10	13	67	46	+21	55	2010 Copa Sudamericana Second Stage
9	Goiás	38	15	10	13	64	65	−1	55	2010 Copa Sudamericana Second Stage
10	Corinthians	38	14	10	14	50	54	−4	52	2010 Copa Libertadores Second Stage (Note: Corinthians qualified as the 2009 Copa do Brasil champion.)
11	Grêmio Barueri	38	12	13	13	59	52	+7	49	2010 Copa Sudamericana Second Stage
12	Santos	38	12	13	13	58	58	0	49	2010 Copa Sudamericana Second Stage
13	Vitória	38	13	9	16	51	57	−6	48	2010 Copa Sudamericana Second Stage
14	Atlético Paranaense	38	13	9	16	42	49	−7	48	
15	Botafogo	38	11	14	13	52	58	−6	47	
16	Fluminense	38	11	13	14	49	56	−7	46	
17	Coritiba (R)	38	12	9	17	48	60	−12	45	Relegation to Série B
18	Santo André (R)	38	11	8	19	46	61	−15	41	Relegation to Série B
19	Náutico (R)	38	10	8	20	48	71	−23	38	Relegation to Série B
20	Sport Recife (R)	38	7	10	21	48	71	−23	31	Relegation to Série B

Source: CBF (in Portuguese)
Rules for classification: 1st points; 2nd wins; 3rd goal difference; 4th goals scored; 5th head-to-head results; 6th least red cards received; 7th least yellow cards received; 8th draw
(C) Champions; (R) Relegated
Notes:

Campeonato Brasileiro de Clubes da Série A
2009 champion

6th title

== Results ==
Home \ Away	CAM	CAP	AVA	BAR	BOT	COR	CTB	CRU	FLA	FLU	GOI	GRE	INT	NAU	PAL	STA	SAN	SPA	SPT	VIT
Atlético Mineiro		2–1	2–2	2–1	1–1	0–3	3–2	0–1	1–3	2–1	0–1	2–1	0–1	3–0	1–1	0–0	3–1	2–0	1–1	1–0
Atlético Paranaense	0–4		1–3	3–0	2–0	1–0	0–0	1–1	0–0	1–0	2–0	0–0	3–2	2–3	2–2	3–0	1–1	1–0	1–0	0–2
Avaí	2–2	2–0		4–0	1–2	3–1	2–2	2–2	3–0	3–2	2–1	1–0	0–2	2–1	0–3	1–0	2–2	0–0	2–2	4–0
Grêmio Barueri	4–2	0–0	3–1		3–0	2–2	3–1	0–1	2–0	0–0	3–1	1–0	1–1	4–0	2–2	0–0	0–0	1–2	2–1	4–0
Botafogo	3–1	0–1	2–2	2–1		0–0	2–0	1–1	0–1	0–0	1–4	3–3	3–2	1–0	2–1	1–2	2–0	3–2	2–2	1–3
Corinthians	2–0	1–3	0–0	2–1	3–3		2–0	0–1	0–2	4–2	1–4	2–1	0–1	2–3	0–3	2–0	2–1	3–1	4–3	2–1
Coritiba	2–1	3–2	2–0	1–2	2–2	1–1		1–3	5–0	1–1	1–3	2–1	2–0	2–0	1–0	2–4	0–1	2–0	1–1	1–0
Cruzeiro	0–3	0–2	1–0	2–4	1–0	1–2	4–1		2–0	2–3	3–0	1–1	1–1	4–2	1–2	3–2	0–0	1–2	1–0	2–0
Flamengo	3–1	2–1	0–0	1–1	2–2	1–0	3–0	1–2		2–0	0–0	2–1	4–0	1–1	1–2	3–0	1–0	2–1	3–0	2–1
Fluminense	2–1	2–1	3–2	0–0	1–0	1–1	1–3	1–1	0–0		1–4	0–0	2–2	1–1	1–0	0–1	1–4	1–0	5–1	4–0
Goiás	2–3	3–0	0–2	2–2	1–3	0–0	2–2	1–0	3–2	2–2		2–1	0–1	3–3	2–1	3–1	2–1	4–2	1–1	3–2
Grêmio	4–1	4–1	3–1	4–2	2–0	3–0	2–0	4–1	4–1	5–1	2–2		2–1	3–0	2–0	3–2	1–1	1–1	3–3	1–1
Internacional	3–0	1–1	2–1	3–2	0–1	1–2	3–0	2–3	0–0	4–2	4–0	1–0		3–1	2–0	4–1	3–1	2–2	3–0	0–0
Náutico	0–0	3–0	0–1	2–1	2–2	1–0	0–1	2–0	0–2	1–1	2–0	0–2	0–2		3–0	2–1	1–2	1–2	3–2	1–1
Palmeiras	3–1	2–1	2–2	2–1	1–1	2–2	2–1	3–1	0–2	1–0	4–0	1–1	2–1	4–1		1–0	1–1	0–0	2–2	2–1
Santo André	1–2	1–0	4–2	1–1	1–1	1–1	1–0	0–2	1–2	1–2	1–2	2–0	0–2	5–3	2–0		3–3	1–1	2–1	1–0
Santos	2–3	1–0	2–2	3–3	0–0	3–1	4–0	1–2	1–2	2–0	3–3	1–0	3–3	3–1	1–3	1–0		3–4	1–0	0–0
São Paulo	0–1	2–2	2–0	1–0	3–1	1–1	2–2	3–0	2–2	1–0	3–1	2–1	1–0	2–0	0–0	1–1	2–1		4–0	2–0
Sport Recife	2–3	0–1	1–3	1–1	2–1	2–0	0–0	2–3	4–2	0–3	1–0	3–1	1–2	3–3	0–1	2–1	0–1	1–2		2–0
Vitória	0–0	2–1	0–1	2–1	4–3	0–1	1–0	3–3	3–3	2–2	2–2	1–0	2–0	3–1	3–2	4–1	6–2	0–1	1–0	

Updated to match(es) played on 5 April 2010. Source: CBF (in Portuguese)
Legend: Blue = home team win; Yellow = draw; Red = away team win.

== Top scorers ==
Pos	Player	Club	Goals
1	(Brazil) Adriano	Flamengo	19
1	(Brazil) Diego Tardelli	Atlético Mineiro	19
3	(Brazil) Val Baiano	Grêmio Barueri	18
4	(Brazil) Washington	São Paulo	17
5	(Brazil) Alecsandro	Internacional	16
6	(Brazil) Roger	Vitória	15
7	(Brazil) Jonas	Grêmio	14
7	(Brazil) Kléber Pereira	Santos	14
7	(Brazil) Marcelinho Paraíba	Coritiba	14
7	(Brazil) Wellington Paulista	Cruzeiro	14

Source: globoesporte.globo.com
Updated as of 8 November 2009.
