= 1993–94 Qatar Stars League =

30th season of top-tier football league in Qatar

Qatar Stars League
- Season: 1993–94
- Champions: Al-Arabi
- Asian Club Championship: Al-Arabi
- Top goalscorer: (Brazil) Marquinho Carioca (Iraq) Ahmed Daham (Qatar) Mahmoud Soufi (9 goals)

Statistics of Qatar Stars League for the 1993–94 season.

== Overview ==
It was contested by 9 teams. Al-Arabi won the league again, retaining their title from last season.

== Personnel ==
| Team | Head coach |
|---|---|
| Al Ahli | |
| Al-Arabi | (Brazil) René Simões |
| Al-Ittihad | (Bosnia and Herzegovina) Džemal Hadžiabdić |
| Al-Rayyan | (Brazil) Cabralzinho |
| Al Sadd | (Qatar) Ahmed Omar |
| Al-Shamal | |
| Al-Taawon | (Hungary) Szapor Gábor |
| Al-Wakrah | (England) Len Ashurst |
| Qatar SC | (Slovakia) Jozef Jankech |

== Foreign players ==
| Team | Player 1 | Player 2 | Player 3 | Former players |
|---|---|---|---|---|
| Al Ahli | | | | |
| Al-Arabi | (Brazil) Marquinho Carioca | (Iran) Karim Bavi | | |
| Al-Ittihad | (Iran) Hassan Shirmohammadi | (Iran) Morteza Kermani Moghaddam | (Iraq) Radhi Shenaishil | (Iraq) Ahmed Daham |
| Al-Rayyan | (Iraq) Laith Hussein | (Iraq) Saad Qais | | |
| Al Sadd | | | | |
| Al-Shamal | | | | |
| Al-Taawon | (Iraq) Alaa Kadhim | | | |
| Al-Wakrah | (Iraq) Ahmed Radhi | | | |
| Qatar SC | (Brazil) Luisinho Lemos | (Cameroon) Émile Mbouh | (Iraq) Habib Jafar | |
