= 1992–93 Qatar Stars League =

29th season of top-tier football league in Qatar

Qatar Stars League
- Season: 1992–93
- Champions: Al-Arabi
- Asian Club Championship: Al-Arabi
- Top goalscorer: (Qatar) Mubarak Mustafa (9 goals)

Statistics of Qatar Stars League for the 1992–93 season.

== Overview ==
It was contested by 9 teams, and Al-Arabi won the league.

== Personnel ==
Team	Head coach
Al Ahli	(Brazil) Paulo Massa
Al-Arabi	(Brazil) Zé Mário
Al-Ittihad	(Bosnia and Herzegovina) Džemal Hadžiabdić
Al-Rayyan	(Brazil) René Simões
Al Sadd	(Brazil) Sebastião Lapola
Al-Shamal	
Al-Taawon	
Al-Wakrah	
Qatar SC	(Iraq) Ammo Baba

== Foreign players ==
Team	Player 1	Player 2	Former players
Al Ahli	(Ghana) Kwame Ayew		
Al-Arabi	(Brazil) Marquinho Carioca		
Al-Ittihad	(Iran) Hassan Shirmohammadi	(Iran) Morteza Kermani Moghaddam	(Iran) Mohsen Ashouri
Al-Rayyan			
Al Sadd			
Al-Shamal			
Al-Taawon			
Al-Wakrah			
Qatar SC	(Brazil) Luisinho Lemos		
