= Cabralzinho =

Cabralzinho may refer to:

- Cabralzinho (footballer), Brazilian football manager
- Cabralzinho, Macapá, a district of Macapá
