= 1997 Qatar Crown Prince Cup =

1997 Crown Prince Cup
Heir Apparent Cup

Tournament details
- Host country: Qatar
- Teams: 4

Final positions
- Champions: Al-Arabi (1st title)

The 1997 Qatar Crown Prince Cup was the 3rd edition of this cup tournament in men's football (soccer). It was played by the top 4 teams of the Q-League.

Al-Arabi were crowned champions for the first time. It was the first tournament that saw the final go to penalties to decide the champion.

== Results ==
Semi-finals
(Qatar)	Al-Rayyan	0	1	1
(Qatar)	Al-Sadd	0	0	0
(Qatar)	Al-Arabi	2	2	4 (5)
(Qatar)	Al-Ittihad	1	3	4 (3)

Final
(Qatar)	Al-Rayyan	0 (3)
(Qatar)	Al-Arabi	0 (4)

1997 Qatar Crown Prince Cup
Winners
Al-Arabi
1st Title
