= Reserve League (Qatar) =

- Founded: 2009; 17 years ago
- Country: Qatar
- Confederation: AFC
- Number of clubs: 12
- Current champions: Al-Markhiya II (2022/2023)
- Most championships: Al Sadd SC (4)

The Reserve League (Arabic: دوري الرديف) is a competition in which 12 teams play each other once during the season. There is no return game.

== History ==
Launched in 2009, the competition was dissolved in 2014 and merged with the Qatari Second Division to form an 18-team competition. Since 2021, the reserve league is active again with 12 B teams from professional clubs.

== Championship history ==
- 2009-10: Al-Arabi
- 2010-11: Al Sadd
- 2011-12: Al Sadd
- 2012-13: Al Sadd
- 2013-14: Al Sadd
- 2021-22: Umm Salal II
- 2022-23: Al-Markhiya II
