= Márcio Bittencourt =

Brazilian footballer and coach

Personal information
- Full name: Henrymárcio Bittencourt
- Date of birth: 19 October 1964 (age 62)
- Place of birth: São José dos Campos, Brazil
- Position: Defensive midfielder

Team information
- Current team: Corinthians (academy staff)

Senior career*
Years	Team	Apps	(Gls)
1985–1991	Corinthians	103	(0)
1992–1995	Internacional	20	(1)
Total		123	(1)

International career
1991	Brazil	4	(0)

Managerial career
- 2005: Corinthians
- 2006: Brasiliense
- 2006: Fortaleza
- 2006–2007: América (SP)
- 2007–2008: Juventus (SP)
- 2008: Noroeste
- 2008: Ipatinga
- 2008–2009: Santa Cruz
- 2009: Náutico
- 2008–2009: Santa Cruz
- 2009: Ponte Preta
- 2010: Monte Azul
- 2010: Ipatinga
- 2011: Volta Redonda
- 2011: Icasa
- 2012: Itumbiara
- 2013: São José-SP
- 2013: Vila Nova
- 2014: Paulista
- 2014: Batatais
- 2016: Icasa
- 2016: Água Santa
- 2017: Comercial (MS)
- 2021: Corinthians U20 (caretaker)
- * Club domestic league appearances and goals

Henrymárcio Bittencourt (born 19 October 1964) is a Brazilian professional football coach, scout and former player who works for Campeonato Brasileiro Série A club Corinthians.

A defensive midfielder, as a player he spent almost his entire club career with Corinthians, where he won the league title in 1990.

== Career ==
=== Club career ===
Bittencourt played for Corinthians and Internacional in the Campeonato Brasileiro Série A.

=== International career ===
Bittencourt represented Brazil at the 1991 Copa América.

=== Coaching career ===
After retiring as a player, Bittencourt became a football manager and managed Corinthians, Brasiliense, Fortaleza, Juventus-SP, Noroeste, Ipatinga, Santa Cruz, Náutico, Associação Atlética Ponte Preta, Ipatinga, Icasa, Itumbiara, São José-SP and Vila Nova.

Since 2017, he's been working for the Corinthians youth teams, mainly as a scout. In 2021, he took charge of the U20 squad as an interim coach.
