= Doha Bank =

Qatari public banking and financial services statutory body

- Doha Bank Tower in the West Bay area (Doha)
- Native name: بنك الدوحة
- Industry: Financial services
- Founder: 1979
- Headquarters: Doha, Qatar
- Key people: Sh. Mohamed bin Fahad bin Mohamed Jabor Al-Thani (Chairman)
- Services: Banking
- Number of employees: 398
- Website: www.dohabank.com.qa

Doha Bank is a Qatari-based bank with its head office in Doha, Qatar.

== History ==
Doha Bank is a Qatari banking institution established in 1979, and it is considered one of the most prominent commercial banks in the State of Qatar. The bank offers a comprehensive range of banking products and financial services, both domestically and internationally, serving a broad spectrum of clients, including individuals, corporations, and institutions. Doha Bank has established branches outside the State of Qatar in Kuwait, the United Arab Emirates, and India in addition to a network of representative offices in various capitals and economic hubs around the world, including Japan, China, Singapore, South Africa, Turkey, United Kingdom, Bangladesh and Nepal.
