= Clássico dos Clássicos =

Brazilian football derby

- Other names: Clássico do Nordeste
- Location: Recife, Pernambuco, Brazil
- Teams: Náutico; Sport
- First meeting: July 25, 1909; Friendly match Náutico 3–1 Sport
- Latest meeting: February 15, 2025; 2025 Campeonato Pernambucano; Sport 1–2 Náutico
- Stadiums: Aflitos (Náutico); Ilha do Retiro (Sport)

Statistics
- Most wins: Sport (218)
- Top scorer: Bita, Náutico (23 goals)
- Largest victory: October 1, 1916; Campeonato Pernambucano; Sport 8–0 Náutico

Clássico dos Clássicos (English: the Derby of Derbies) is a football derby between two crosstown football teams in the Brazilian city of Recife: Clube Náutico Capibaribe and Sport Club do Recife. It is the third oldest derby in Brazilian football, only after the Clássico Vovô and Grenal.

== Background ==
The history of the two clubs has been linked since their origins, since Sport was founded by Guilherme de Aquino after Náutico directors refused his offer to introduce a football department to the club, which was originally founded as a rowing club. Náutico's football team first match was against Sport, in which Timbu won 3–1.

The fixture received its current name of "Clássico dos Clássicos" in an advertisement in "Jornal Pequeno" on August 18, 1945.

The rivalry between the two clubs is intense and is reflected in part by the opposing teams' colors: the principal colors of Clube Náutico Capibaribe are red and white; those of Sport Club do Recife are red and black. The competitiveness has sometimes given rise to conflicts between the supporters of the teams, especially among organized members of the teams' fan clubs. Security has been a significant concern for the local authorities, involving large numbers of police and firefighters.

== Statistics ==
Matches Played	Sport wins	Draws	Náutico Wins
569	218	163	188

Náutico has scored 653 goals and Sport Recife has scored 716.

=== Titles comparison ===
Competitions	Náutico	Sport
Brazilian Championship Série A	-	1
Brazil Cup	-	1
Brazilian Championship Série B	-	1
Brazilian Championship Série C	1	-
Total	1	3
Other Competitions	Náutico	Sport
Pernambucano Championship	24	44
Northeast Cup	-	3
Norte-Nordeste Tournament	3	1
Torneio dos Campeões do Norte–Nordeste	1	-
Total General	28	48

== Highest attendance ==
Náutico 0–2 Sport, 80,203, March 15, 1998, Arruda Stadium.
