= Leandro Niehues =

Brazilian football manager

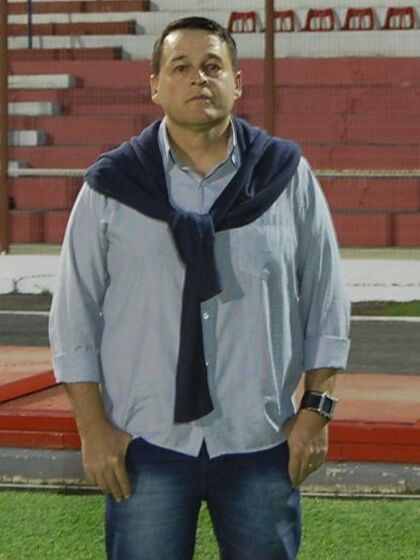
- Niehues in 2017

Personal information
- Full name: Leandro Carlos Silveira Niehues
- Date of birth: 14 March 1973 (age 53)
- Place of birth: Toledo, Brazil

Team information
- Current team: (assistant)

Managerial career
- Years: Team
- 1994–1995: Londrina U20
- 1996–2004: PSTC U20
- 2004–2007: Atlético Paranaense U20
- 2006: Atlético Paranaense (interim)
- 2007–2009: Corinthians Paranaense
- 2009–2011: Atlético Paranaense (assistant)
- 2010: Atlético Paranaense U23
- 2010: Atlético Paranaense (interim)
- 2012: Corinthians Paranaense
- 2014: Arapongas
- 2014: Inter de Lages
- 2015: Luverdense
- 2015: Volta Redonda
- 2016: Rio Branco-PR
- 2016: Vila Nova
- 2017: Espírito Santo
- 2018: Inter de Lages
- 2019–2020: Paysandu (assistant)
- 2019: Paysandu (interim)
- 2020: Iporá
- 2020: Paysandu (assistant)
- 2020: Paysandu (interim)
- 2020: Paysandu (interim)
- 2020–2022: Operário Ferroviário (assistant)
- 2021: Operário Ferroviário (interim)
- 2023: Santo André (assistant)

Leandro Carlos Silveira Niehues (born 14 March 1973) is a Brazilian football coach.

== Honours ==
Inter de Lages

- Campeonato Catarinense Série B: 2014
