= Jorge Parraga =

Brazilian football manager and former player

Personal information
- Full name: Jorge Porto Iparraguirre
- Date of birth: 15 June 1950 (age 76)
- Place of birth: Bauru, Brazil
- Height: 1.82 m (5 ft 11 1/2 in)
- Position: Center forward

Team information
- Current team: Independente de Limeira (manager)

Senior career*
| Years | Team | Apps | (Gls) |
| 1973–1975 | Inter de Lages | | |
| 1974 | → Novo Hamburgo (loan) | | |
| 1975–1977 | Ponte Preta | | |
| 1978 | Náutico | | |
| 1979 | Ferroviária | | |
| 1980 | Francana | | |
| 1980 | Ponte Preta | | |
| 1980–1981 | Al-Ettifaq | | |
| 1981 | Noroeste | | |
| 1982 | América-SP | | |
| 1983 | Esportivo | | |
| 1984 | Amparo | | |

Managerial career
- 1991: Inter de Lages
- 1992: Rio Branco-SP
- 1993: Novorizontino
- 1994: Monte Azul
- 1995: Tanabi
- 1996: Mirassol
- 1997: Batatais
- 2003–2008: PAEC U20
- 2008: Paraná U20
- 2008: Portuguesa U20
- 2009–2010: Palmeiras B
- 2010: Palmeiras (interim)
- 2011: Olímpia
- 2011: Independente de Limeira
- 2011–2012: Grêmio U20
- 2012: Grêmio Prudente
- 2013: União Suzano
- 2013–2014: Guaçuano
- 2015: Ponte Preta U20
- 2015–2016: Inter de Limeira
- 2019–: Independente de Limeira
- * Club domestic league appearances and goals

Jorge Porto Iparraguirre (born 15 July 1950), commonly known as Parraga, is a Brazilian retired footballer who played as a forward, and is the manager of Independente de Limeira.

== Managerial career ==
Parraga was a center forward Ponte Preta in the 1970s and 1980s. In May 2010 was named acting team from Palmeiras, after the departure of Antônio Carlos Zago.

In 2008, he worked as technical coordinator of the project of Pão de Açúcar Juvenil to the basic categories. He also coached in the youth team in the proper club. He also directed the junior team of Paraná Cup São Paulo Football Junior. The following year he transferred to the base of Palmeiras and, after the resignation of Muricy Ramalho, took over the club's first team on an interim basis. He coached the team for a month before the hiring of manager Luiz Felipe Scolari.

In October 2010, with the possible exception of Palmeiras B, Parraga resigned from the team. Speculation that former club Parraga not materialized and the team will compete in the Football Championship 2011 - Series A2.

He also worked as coach of the junior category of Portuguesa.
