= Marquinho Carioca =

Brazilian footballer

Personal information
- Full name: Marco Antônio Rodrigues Henriques
- Date of birth: 8 August 1960 (age 66)
- Place of birth: São João de Meriti, Brazil
- Height: 1.65 m (5 ft 5 in)
- Position: Attacking midfielder

Youth career
- 1978–1979: Vasco da Gama

Senior career*
Years	Team	Apps	(Gls)
1980–1984	Vasco da Gama		
1983	→ Fortaleza (loan)		
1985	Fluminense		
1986–1987	Flamengo	115	(14)
1987–1988	Atlético Mineiro	45	(4)
1988–1989	Coritiba		
1989	Fluminense		
1989–1995	Al-Arabi		(19+)

International career
1981	Brazil U20		
1984	Brazil	2	(0)
- * Club domestic league appearances and goals

Marco Antonio Rodrigues Henriques (born 8 August 1960), better known as Marquinho Carioca, is a Brazilian former professional footballer who played as an attacking midfielder.

== Club career ==
Marquinho started playing for the youth team of Vasco da Gama, eventually getting promoted to the senior squad in 1980, In the 1982 Campeonato Carioca he scored a decisive goal for Vasco da Gama. In 1983, He was loaned out to Fortaleza for a lone season,

In 1985, Marquinho joined Flamengo and played for them for three seasons, playing alongside players such as Zico, Bebeto, Aldair, etc., He also helped them win the league in 1986.

He also played for Atlético Mineiro, Coritiba, Fluminense.

In 1989, Marquinho joined Qatari League side Al-Arabi, proving to be an influential player winning the Qatari League, Emir Cup, etc. Scoring twice in the 1989/90 Emir Cup final.

Marquinho stood out for his physical intensity, capable of running throughout the match without tiring.

== International career ==
Marquinho played for the Brazil U20 in 1981, which were the champions of the Toulon Tournament. He also made two senior appearances for the Brazilian national team.

== Honours ==
Vasco da Gama

- Campeonato Carioca: 1982
- Taça Rio: 1984

Flamengo

- Campeonato Carioca: 1986
- Taça Rio: 1986

Atlético Mineiro

- Campeonato Mineiro: 1988

Fluminense

- Kyiv Tournament: 1989

Al-Arabi

- Qatar Stars League: 1990–91, 1992–93, 1993–94
- Emir of Qatar Cup: 1992–93
- Qatar Sheikh Jassem Cup: 1994

Brazil U20

- Toulon Tournament: 1981
