= Flavio Tenius =

Brazilian footballer (born 1970)

Personal information
- Full name: Flavio de Britto Pereira Tenius
- Date of birth: 8 May 1970 (age 56)
- Place of birth: Brazil
- Position: Goalkeeper

Team information
- Current team: Fluminense Football Club (goalkeeping coach)

Youth career
- Bonsucesso

Senior career*
Years	Team	Apps	(Gls)
1983–1985	Botafogo		
1986	Serrano-RJ		
1987	Olaria	26	(0)
1988	Vasco da Gama		
1991	São Cristóvão	4	(0)

Managerial career
- 2011: Botafogo (interim)
- 2020: Botafogo (interim)
- 2022: Fluminense Football Club (interim)
- * Club domestic league appearances and goals

Flavio de Britto Pereira Tenius (born 8 May 1970) is a Brazilian retired footballer who played as a goalkeeper, and is the current goalkeeping coach of Fluminense Football Club.

== Playing career ==
Tenius finished his formation with Bonsucesso before spending three years at Botafogo. He started to appear regularly with Serrano-RJ in 1986, and went on to represent Olaria, Vasco da Gama and São Cristóvão.

== Coaching career ==
After retiring Tenius started working as a goalkeeping coach, initially with Flamengo. He subsequently worked with Cruzeiro, Corinthians, Atlético Mineiro and Botafogo.

On 17 November 2011, after the dismissal of Caio Júnior, Tenius was named interim manager of Botafogo's main squad. His reign lasted three matches (one draw and two defeats), and he returned to his previous role after the appointment of Oswaldo de Oliveira.

On 16 December 2014, was named the new goalkeeping coach of another club he represented as a player, Vasco. On 15 August 2016, he returned to Bota under the same role.

On 28 October 2020, Tenius was again appointed interim manager of Botafogo after the dismissal of Bruno Lazaroni.
