= Sérgio Baresi =

Brazilian footballer

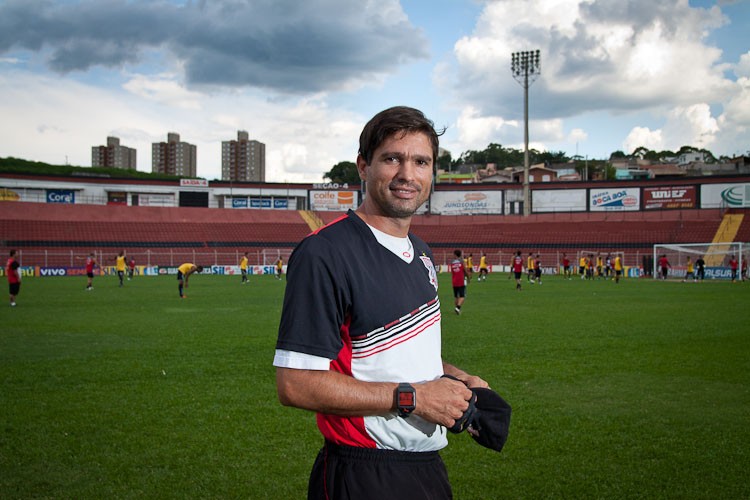

Personal information
- Full name: Sérgio Felipe Soares
- Date of birth: January 2, 1973 (age 53)
- Place of birth: Óleo, Brazil
- Position: Defender

Managerial career
- Years: Team
- 2003: Santo André (assistant)
- 2004: Santo André (youth team)
- 2005–2008: São Caetano (youth team)
- 2008–: São Paulo (U-20)
- 2009: → Toledo
- 2010: → São Paulo (caretaker)
- 2012: → Paulista

Sérgio Felipe Soares, or simply Sérgio Baresi (born January 2, 1973) is a former Brazilian football player at the position of centre back. Nowadays, he is São Paulo (U-20) manager.

== Honours ==
São Paulo U20

- Copa São Paulo de Futebol Júnior: 2010
