= PC Gusmão =

Brazilian footballer and manager

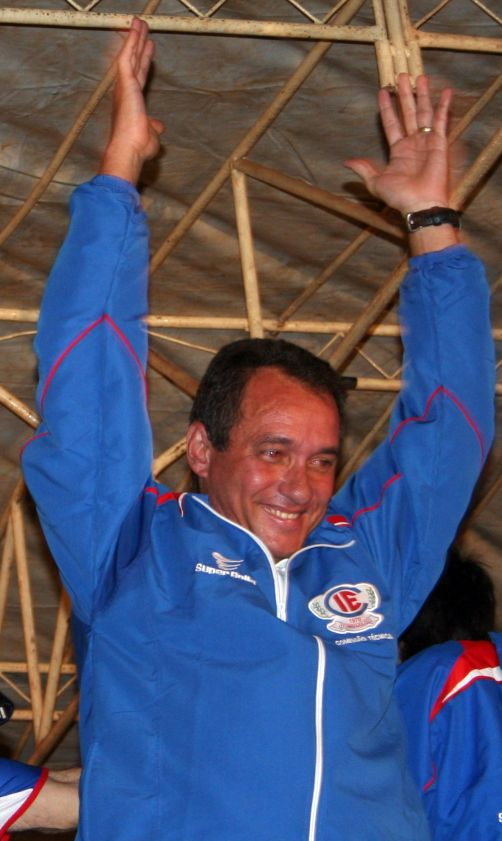
- PC Gusmão celebrating Itumbiara's championship title

Personal information
- Full name: Paulo César Lopes de Gusmão
- Date of birth: 19 May 1962 (age 64)
- Place of birth: Rio de Janeiro, Brazil
- Position: Goalkeeper

Youth career
- 1977–1981: Vasco da Gama

Senior career*
Years	Team	Apps	(Gls)
1982–1986	Vasco da Gama		
1987	Campo Grande		
1988–1989	Cabofriense		
1990	Pouso Alegre		
1991	Campo Grande		

Managerial career
- 2001: Vasco da Gama (interim)
- 2002: Palmeiras (interim)
- 2004: Cruzeiro
- 2004: Flamengo
- 2005: Cabofriense
- 2005: Botafogo
- 2005–2006: Cruzeiro
- 2006: São Caetano
- 2006–2007: Fluminense
- 2007: Náutico
- 2008: Itumbiara
- 2008: Figueirense
- 2009: Juventude
- 2009: Atlético Goianiense
- 2009–2010: Ceará
- 2010–2011: Vasco da Gama
- 2011: Atlético Goianiense
- 2011: Sport Recife
- 2012: Ceará
- 2012: Vitória
- 2013: Atlético Goianiense
- 2014: Al-Arabi
- 2014: Bragantino
- 2014: Ceará
- 2015: Penapolense
- 2015–2016: Joinville
- 2016: Marítimo
- 2017: Madureira
- 2017: Portuguesa
- 2018: Madureira
- 2018: Santa Cruz
- 2023: Londrina
- * Club domestic league appearances and goals

Paulo César Lopes de Gusmão (born 19 May 1962), known as PC Gusmão, is a Brazilian football coach and former player who played as a goalkeeper.

== Playing career ==
Born in Rio de Janeiro, Gusmão started his career playing for Vasco da Gama. He subsequently represented Campo Grande, Cabofriense and Pouso Alegre before returning to Campo Grande in 1991 and retiring shortly after.

== Coaching career ==
After retiring, Gusmão returned to his first club Vasco in 1992, as a goalkeeping coach. He continued to work under that role in the following years, with Fluminense (1995), Flamengo (1996), Santos (1997) and Corinthians (1998).

In 1999, after the appointment of Oswaldo de Oliveira as the head coach of Timão, Gusmão was invited to become his assistant. He followed Oswaldo to Vasco in the following year, being also an interim head coach of the club in 2001 after the departure of Hélio dos Anjos.

In August 2002, Gusmão was an interim head coach of Palmeiras, after Vanderlei Luxemburgo left for Cruzeiro. He was in charge of the club for just one match before returning to his previous role, and moved to the latter club in 2003, as Luxemburgo's assistant.

Gusmão's first permanent job as a head coach came in February 2004, after Luxemburgo left Cruzeiro. Despite winning the year's Campeonato Mineiro, he was sacked on 16 May, and was appointed in charge of Flamengo on 27 July.

Gusmão was dismissed by Fla on 17 August 2004, in spite of a 3–0 win over Grêmio. After starting the 2005 season in charge of Cabofriense, he was named head coach of Botafogo on 25 March of that year. He resigned from the latter club on 27 June, after just ten matches.

Gusmão returned to Cruzeiro on 6 July 2005, replacing Levir Culpi. He was sacked on 14 August of the following year, after five winless matches, and took over São Caetano two days later. He only lasted four matches at the club, being relieved from his duties late in the month.

On 29 September 2006, Gusmão was named Fluminense head coach, replacing sacked Antônio Lopes. He was sacked the following 11 February, after a poor start of the season, and was presented at Náutico on 12 March 2007.

Gusmão resigned from Timbu on 29 June 2007, and started the 2008 campaign in charge of Itumbiara. He was appointed head coach of Figueirense on 24 June of that year, but was dismissed on 15 September.

On 18 December 2008, Gusmão was named Juventude head coach for the upcoming season. He left the club the following 18 February to take over Atlético Goianiense, but was sacked on 5 May after losing the year's Campeonato Goiano.

On 21 May 2009, Gusmão was appointed at the helm of Ceará. He led the club to a promotion in the 2009 Série B, but left on 13 June 2010; hours after leaving, he returned to Vasco, now announced as head coach.

Sacked by Vasco on 28 January 2011, Gusmão returned to Atlético Goianiense on 5 April, but left the latter on 21 July due to personal problems. He took over Sport Recife on 19 August, but was dismissed on 29 October.

Back to Ceará on 13 March 2012, Gusmão was sacked by the club on 29 October. He was announced at Vitória for the remaining four matches of the 2012 Série B on 4 November, and despite achieving promotion, he did not renew his contract for the ensuing season and left late in the month.

Gusmão returned to Atlético Goianiense on 5 August 2013, replacing René Simões, but was sacked on 28 October, with the club in the relegation zone of the 2013 Série B. He subsequently moved abroad for the first time in his career, taking over Qatari club Al-Arabi, before returning to his home country on 28 July 2014 to coach Bragantino.

Gusmão left Braga on 22 October 2014 to return to Ceará. He left after failing to achieve promotion, and replaced Narciso at the helm of Penapolense on 11 February 2015.

On 27 July 2015, Gusmão replaced Adilson Batista at the helm of Série A side Joinville. After a poor start in the 2016 season, he was sacked by JEC on 14 February, before taking over Portuguese side Marítimo on 1 June; he only lasted three-and-a-half months at the latter.

On 3 November 2016, Gusmão was appointed Madureira head coach for the 2017 Campeonato Carioca. He was named in charge of Portuguesa on 14 August 2017, but left the latter club on 21 November, citing family issues.

Gusmão returned to Madureira on 23 November 2017, but was sacked the following 29 January. He was appointed Santa Cruz head coach on 20 April 2018, but was relieved from his duties on 23 May, after being knocked out of the 2018 Copa do Nordeste.

On 5 June 2018, Gusmão returned to Vasco, now as a technical coordinator. He left on 10 February 2021, after his contract was not renewed, and was named under a football coordinator role at Londrina on 12 November 2021.

On 28 October 2022, Gusmão returned to Ceará as a technical coordinator. He was fired from the role the following 16 May, before returning to coaching duties late in that month, after being named head coach of Londrina.

Gusmão only lasted five matches at LEC, before leaving on a mutual agreement on 29 June 2023.

== Honorius ==
=== Player ===
Vasco da Gama

- Campeonato Carioca: 1988

=== Manager ===
Cruzeiro

- Campeonato Mineiro: 2004, 2006

Itumbiara

- Campeonato Goiano: 2008

Atlético Goianiense

- Campeonato Goiano: 2011

Ceará

- Campeonato Cearense: 2012
