= Al-Arabi SC (Qatar) =

Sports club in Qatar

Al-Arabi
- Full name: Al-Arabi Sports Club (Arabic: النادي العربي الرياضي)
- Nicknames: Fareeg Al-Ahlam (The Dream Team); Century Club in Qatar
- Short name: ARB
- Founded: 1 April 1952 (74 years ago), as Shabab Al-Sharq
- Ground: Al Thumama Stadium, Doha, Qatar
- Capacity: 44,400
- President: Sheikh Tamim Bin Fahad Al Thani
- Head coach: Cosmin Contra
- League: Qatar Stars League
- 2025–26: Qatar Stars League, 7th of 12
- Website: alarabi.qa
Home colours	Away colours	Third colours

Al-Arabi Sports Club (Arabic: النادي العربي الرياضي) is a Qatari sports club based in the capital city Doha. Founded in 1952, one team of the club is the football team that competes in the Qatar Stars League. The club's home ground is the 44,400-seat Al Thumama Stadium, in Qatar where they have played since 2023.

Al-Arabi had their first major success in 1978, winning the Emir of Qatar Cup, followed by various titles during the 1980s and 1990s. The club enjoyed their greatest period of success in those two decades, winning 17 major trophies. Domestically, Al-Arabi have won seven league titles, eight Emir of Qatar Cups, one Qatar Crown Prince Cup and six Qatar Sheikh Jassem Cups. Whilst they have also won the Qatar X UAE Super cup April 2023. This is their first International success. They have faced Sharjah FC and won.

Al-Arabi's regular kit colours are red shirts and shorts with red socks. The club's crest has been changed several times in attempts to re-brand the club and modernise its image. The current crest, featuring a ceremonial falcon, is a modification of the one introduced in the early 1950s.

== History ==
=== Foundation (1952–1972) ===
The club was founded in 1952 under the name "Shabab Al-Sharq" which was changed to "Al-Tahrir" in 1956. The next year, the club merged with Al-Wehda, a club founded in the same year, under the name of Al-Wehda. Al-Wehda did not play outside of Qatar nor host any foreign clubs due to its limited budget.

In 1972, the club rebranded under the name, Al-Arabi.

Al-Arabi had one of the largest fan bases in Qatar, as well as in other Gulf states. The club's popularity outside the Middle East was bolstered by their achievements and national team players. In 2003, the club signed Argentine striker Gabriel Batistuta.

=== Emergence (1972–1980s) ===
The club established itself as one of the leading teams in Qatari football during the 1970s. Arabi finished as runners-up in the 1975–76 Emir Cup and went on to win the Emir Cup three consecutive times. The club defeated Al-Wakrah in the 1977–78 and 1978–79 finals, before overcoming Al-Khor in the 1979–80 final.

The club continued its rise throughout the 1980s, emerging as one of Qatar's dominant football clubs. The squad featured several players who were a part of the Qatar national football team as well, including Ali Zaid, Ibrahim Khalfan, and Man'a Al-Barshi. During the decade, the club won the Qatari League title twice, in 1982–83 and 1984–85. Al-Arabi also once again lifted the Emir Cup in 1982–83 and 1983–84, and later claimed back-to-back titles in 1988–89 and 1989–90. In addition, the club won the Sheikh Jassim Cup in 1980 and again in 1982.

=== Golden era (1990s) ===
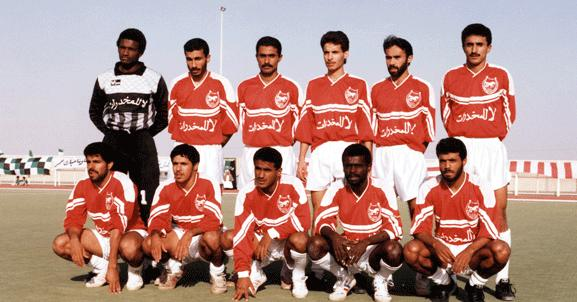
The Al-Arabi squad photographed in 1993

The 1990s was a successful period for Al-Arabi SC. During this decade, Al-Arabi assembled a squad featuring foreign players Marquinho Carioca and Richard Owebuker.

The club dominated the Qatari League throughout the 1990s, winning the title five times, in 1990–91, 1992–93, 1993–94, 1995–96, and 1996–97. During this time, the team also achieved a runners-up position at the AFC Champions League in 1995, losing to Thai Farmers Bank FC in the final. They also won the 1992–93 Emir Cup, The Sheikh Jassim Cup in 1994, and the 1997 Qatar Crown Prince Cup, defeating Al-Rayyan on penalties.

=== Decline (2000–2010s) ===
The early 2000s marked a period of decline for Al-Arabi SC, as the club experienced a significant drop in performance following the departure of key players, and increased competition from domestic rivals. In the 2001–02 season, Al-Arabi finished seventh, their lowest league position since joining the Qatar Stars League.

The signing of Gabriel Batistuta in 2003 briefly raised expectations, as the club finished higher than in the two previous seasons. However, Al-Arabi continued to struggle and ended the 2006–07 season in ninth place, setting a new low in the club's league history. The team failed to secure any domestic titles during this period and achieved limited success in international competitions. That season also included the club's heaviest-ever defeat, a 7–0 loss to Al-Sadd, which led to the dismissal of head coach Cabralzinho.

In 2006, following widespread criticism of club president Sheikh Falah bin Jassim, an administrative change took place, and Sheikh Faisal bin Mubarak was elected as the new president.

=== Crisis (2011–present) ===
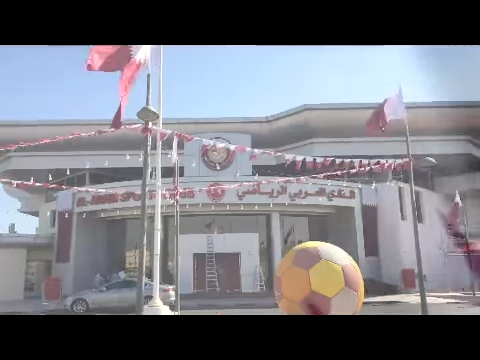
Al Arabi headquarters in 2015

The beginning of the 2011–12 season initially looked bright for Al-Arabi, with the club winning its first domestic silverware in 13 years after defeating Umm Salal SC in the final of the 2011 Sheikh Jassem Cup. However, a string of bad results in the league resulted in the sacking of their coach, Paulo Silas.

They also qualified for the 2012 AFC Champions League, in which they were the first team to be eliminated. During this period, the club had appointed three coaches in a span of three months. They became the first team since 2007 to lose every match of the group stage, as well as the first Qatari team to witness such failure.

As a result, the club's director of football, Mubarak Mustafa, announced his departure from the club. Furthermore, club president Abdullah al-Mal announced his retirement from sports. He was replaced by Hitme bin Ali Al-Hitmi. The fiscal budget of the club was reduced from 15 million riyals to 9 million riyals.

== Al-Arabi Fans Club ==
The Al-Arabi Fans Club was established on 21 October 2015.

== Stadium ==
Al Thumama Stadium

Grand Hamad Stadium (Arabic: استاد حمد الكبير), with a capacity of 13,000 people, was the club's initial home stadium. In 2023 the team moved to Al Thumama Stadium due to its larger capacity of 44,400.

== Rivalries ==
=== Al-Rayyan ===
Al-Rayyan and Al-Arabi -- their clash is known as the "Fans Derby".

==== Head-to-head ====
From 1994 to 2017.

Head-to-head
Competition	P	W	D	L	GF	GA	GD
Qatar Stars League	49	11	17	21	63	88	−25
Sheikh Jassem Cup	4	3	1	0	8	2	+6
Emir Cup	6	2	1	3	9	10	−1
Crown Prince Cup	7	1	1	5	6	16	−10
Reserve League	5	1	1	3	12	15	−3
Qatar Stars Cup	1	0	0	1	0	2	−2
Total	72	18	21	33	98	133	−35

=== Al-Sadd ===
Al-Arabi's clashes with Al-Sadd are considered the season's biggest as they are contested by Qatar's two most successful teams. The derby is an important component of the country's culture.

Al-Arabi always regarded itself as the club of Qatar's working class, in contrast to the more upper-class support base of Al-Sadd. The class divide between the two fanbases eventually diminished.

==== Memorable matches ====
Bold indicates a win.

Season	Result	Competition	Notes
1981–82	**0–1**	Emir Cup	
1985–86	1–0	Emir Cup	
1992–93	**2–0**	Emir Cup	
1995–96	0–0	Qatar Stars League	Al Arabi crowned champions.
2009–10	3–3	Qatar Stars League	Al Sadd come back from 3–0 down to deny Al Arabi an ACL spot.

==== Head-to-head ====
From 1996 to 2017.

Head-to-head
Competition	P	W	D	L	GF	GA	GD
Qatar Stars League	49	13	12	24	54	91	−37
Sheikh Jassem Cup	6	1	0	5	8	13	−5
Emir Cup	11	3	2	6	11	17	−6
Crown Prince Cup	2	1	0	1	3	3	0
Reserve League	6	2	2	2	11	11	0
Qatar Stars Cup	4	1	2	1	8	12	−4
Total	78	21	18	39	95	147	−52

=== Shirt sponsors and manufacturers ===
Period	Kit manufacture	Shirt main sponsor	Shirt sub sponsor
2000–2001	(Thailand) Grand Sport	Doha Bank	None
2001–2002	(Germany) Adidas	Doha Bank	None
2002–2003"	(Germany) Adidas	Doha Bank	None
2003–2004	(Italy) Erreà	Doha Bank	None
2004–2005"	(Thailand) Grand Sport	None	None
2005–2006	(Thailand) Grand Sport	None	None
2006–2007	(Germany) Adidas	Doha Bank	None
2007–2008	(Switzerland) Burrda Sport	None	None
2008–2009	(Switzerland) Burrda Sport	None	None
2009–2010	(Switzerland) Burrda Sport	QPM	Salman & brother & Al Rayan Bank
2010–2011	(Switzerland) Burrda Sport	QPM	Salman & brother
2011–2012	(Germany) Adidas	QPM	Salman & brother
2012–2013	(Germany) Adidas	None	Salman & brother
2013–2017	(Germany) Adidas	None	None
2017–2018	(Switzerland) Burrda Sport	None	None
2018–2019	(Germany) Puma	None	None
2019-2021	(Germany) Puma	Doha Bank	Sharq Insurance & Dreama
2021 – 2022	(Germany) Puma	Doha Bank	Sharq Insurance & Dreama & Snoonu
2022 – 2023	(Germany) Puma	Snoonu	
2023 – Present	(Germany) Adidas	Doha Bank	None

Al Khaleej Takaful

== Honours ==
=== International ===
- Asian Club Championship
  - Runners-up (1): 1994–95

=== Regional ===
- Qatar–UAE Super Cup
  - Winners (1): 2023–24

=== Domestic ===
- Qatar Stars League
  - Champions (7): 1982–83, 1984–85, 1990–91, 1992–93, 1993–94, 1995–96, 1996–97
- Emir of Qatar Cup
  - Champions (9): 1977–78, 1978–79, 1979–80, 1982–83, 1983–84, 1988–89, 1989–90, 1992–93, 2022–23
- Qatar Crown Prince Cup
  - Champions (1): 1997
- Qatar FA Cup
  - Champions (1) : 2021–22
- Qatar Sheikh Jassem Cup
  - Champions (6): 1980, 1982, 1994, 2008, 2010, 2011

== Performance in AFC competitions ==
- Asian Club Championship: 5 appearances

1987: Group stage (Top 8)
1993: Qualifying – 1st round
1995: Runners-up
1996: Group stage (Top 8)
1999: First Round

- Asian Cup Winners' Cup: 2 appearances

1990–91: Second Round
1993–94: Semi-final

- AFC Champions League Elite: 2 appearance

2012: Group stage
2023: 2nd Qualifying Round

== Performance in AGCFF competitions ==
- Gulf Club Champions Cup: 11 appearances

1983: Group stage
1986: Runners-up
1993: 3rd place
1995: 3rd place
1996: 6th place
1998: 5th place
1999: 4th place
2002: Group stage
2006: Group stage
2011: Quarter-finals
2015: Group stage

== Performance in UAFA competitions ==
- Arab Cup Winners' Cup: 2 appearances

1991: Group stage
1995: Group stage

- Arab Club Champions Cup: 2 appearances

1987: Group stage
1992: Runners-up

== Players ==
As of Qatar Stars League:

Note: Flags indicate national team as defined under FIFA eligibility rules; some limited exceptions apply. Players may hold more than one non-FIFA nationality.

No.	Pos.	Nation	Player
2	DF	QAT	Marwan Sherif
3	DF	QAT	Mohammed Al-Naimi
4	DF	QAT	Al-Hashmi Al-Hussain
5	DF	ESP	Simo Keddari
6	MF	MAR	Oussama Tannane
7	MF	ESP	Pablo Sarabia
8	MF	QAT	Ahmed Fatehi
9	FW	QAT	Mohamed Khaled Gouda
10	MF	ESP	Rodri
11	FW	QAT	Lotfi Madjer (on loan from Al-Duhail)
13	GK	QAT	Yousef Hassan
14	FW	KEN	Michael Olunga
15	MF	QAT	Faisal Al-Obaidili
16	MF	QAT	Salem Reda
17	MF	FRA	Jordan Veretout

No.	Pos.	Nation	Player
19	DF	QAT	Issa Laye
20	DF	PLE	Ameed Mahajna
22	DF	QAT	Khatab Bauobida
24	MF	SOM	Yonis Abdurisag
25	DF	COL	Alexis Pérez
30	MF	QAT	Salem Al-Hajri
31	GK	QAT	Jasem Al-Hail
33	GK	SYR	Qusay Faisal
34	MF	JOR	Abdullah Faroun
40	MF	ALG	Mahdi Adam
44	MF	QAT	Hassan Saif
80	FW	FRA	Isaac Lihadji
90	FW	TUN	Youssef Snana (on loan from Al-Shamal)
98	DF	ESP	Jorge Monegal
99	FW	QAT	João Darros

=== Out on loan ===
Note: Flags indicate national team as defined under FIFA eligibility rules; some limited exceptions apply. Players may hold more than one non-FIFA nationality.

No. / Pos. / Nation / Player; 12 / DF / QAT / Abdullah Al-Sulaiti (at Al Shahaniya)	No. / Pos. / Nation / Player; — / MF / ESP / Gerard Hernández (at Al-Khor)

== Club staff ==
Technical and administrative staff

Last updated: December 2025.

Coaching staff
Head coach	(Romania) Cosmin Contra
Assistant coach	(Romania) Laurențiu Roșu (Romania) Cornel Dobre (Algeria) Kamal Ikhlef
Goalkeeper coach	(Iran) (Qatar) Masoud Zeraei (Spain) Roberto Sambade
Fitness coach	(Sweden) Marcus Svensson (Spain) Javier Reyes
Physical coach	(Qatar) Mubarak Al-Yazidi
Performance analyst	(Qatar) Jassem Ibrahim
Match analyst	(Qatar) Yousef Al-Sheeb
Administration staff
Team manager	(Qatar) Adel Al Busairi
Reserve team manager	(Qatar) Hamad Al-Sulaiti
Deputy director	(Qatar) Ali Al-Sulaiti

Youth team technical director
Technical director	(Netherlands) Petrus In 't Groen
Youth team coaching staff
U–19 head coach	(Croatia) Teo Pirija
U–17 head coach	(Sudan) Omer Khalid
U–15 head coach	(Tunisia) Abderrazak Kniss
U–14 head coach	(Sudan) Yousif Hamoor
U–13 head coach	(Netherlands) Gideon Dijks
Goalkeeper coach	(Brazil) Sandro Daros
	(Brazil) Orlando Ribecaro

== Club officials ==
=== Managerial history ===
Present and past managers of Al-Arabi (incomplete):
(* denotes caretaker role)

=== Al-Arabi (1972–present) ===
- (Qatar) (Sudan) Salah Daf'Allah (1972) (player–manager)
- (Egypt) Wagdi Jamal (1975–76)
- (Qatar) Jaber Yusif Al-Jassim (1976–78)
- (Qatar) (Iraq) Abdul Ameer Zainal (1978)
- (Brazil) Silas Gonçalves de Oliveira (1978–80)
- (Qatar) (Egypt) Hassan Mokhtar (1980)
- (Brazil) Procópio Cardoso (1981–83)
- (Brazil) João Francisco (1983–84)
- (Brazil) Sebastião (1984)
- (Brazil) Cabralzinho (1984–86)
- (Brazil) Sebastião (1986–??)
- (England) Joseph Bowie (1988–89)
- (Brazil) Luis Alberto (1989–91)
- (Brazil) Oswaldo de Oliveira (1991–92)
- (Brazil) Zé Mário (1992)
- (England) Colin Addison (1992–93)
- (Brazil) Zé Mário (1993)
- (Brazil) René Simões (1993–94)
- (Brazil) Oswaldo de Oliveira (1994–95)
- (Brazil) Cláudio Galbo Garcia (1995–96)
- (Qatar) Abdullah Saad (1996)
- (Bosnia and Herzegovina) Džemaludin Mušović (1996–97)
- (Germany) Ernst (1997–98)
- (Brazil) Ferdinando Teixeira (1998)
- (Qatar) Abdullah Saad (1998)
- (Brazil) Ednaldo Patricio (1998)
- (Ukraine) Anatoliy Azarenkov (1998–99)
- (Brazil) José Paulo Rubim (1999)
- (Brazil) Ednaldo Patricio (1999)
- (Denmark) Roald Poulsen (1999)
- (Bosnia and Herzegovina) Fuad Muzurović (1999)
- (Qatar) Abdullah Saad (1999–00)
- (Chile) Luis Santibáñez (2000)
- (Iraq) Adnan Dirjal (2000–01)
- (Brazil) Procópio Cardoso (2001)
- (Qatar) Abdullah Saad* (2001–02)
- (Serbia) Slobodan Santrač (2002–03)
- (Brazil) Carlos Roberto Pereira (2003)
- (Brazil) Cabralzinho (July 2003 – Nov 2003)
- (Germany) Wolfgang Sidka (16 Nov 2003 – 30 June 2005)
- (Romania) Ilie Balaci (June 2005 – July 2006)
- (France) Henri Michel (1 July 2006 – 21 Oct 2006)
- (Qatar) Abdullah Saad* (Oct 2006 – Nov 2006)
- (Croatia) Srećko Juričić (1 Nov 2006 – 31 Dec 2006)
- (Portugal) José Romão (Feb 2007 – March 2008)
- (Brazil) Adilson Fernandes (March 2008 – April 2008)
- (Brazil) Zé Mário (July 2008 – Dec 2008)
- (Brazil) Luiz Carlos* (Dec 2008 – Jan 2009)
- (Germany) Uli Stielike (5 Jan 2009 – 30 July 2010)
- (Brazil) Péricles Chamusca (1 July 2010 – 3 June 2011)
- (Brazil) Paulo Silas (9 June 2011 – 3 Jan 2012)
- (Qatar) Abdullah Saad* (1 Jan 2012 – 19 March 2012)
- (France) Pierre Lechantre (19 March 2012 – 27 Sept 2012)
- (Morocco) Abdelaziz Bennij* (Sept 2012 – Oct 2012)
- (Egypt) Hassan Shehata (6 Oct 2012 – 6 Dec 2012)
- (Morocco) Abdelaziz Bennij (Dec 2012 – June 2013)
- (Germany) Uli Stielike (5 June 2013 – Feb 2014)
- (Brazil) Paulo César Gusmão (Feb 2014 – 5 June 2014)
- (Romania) Dan Petrescu (5 June 2014 – 1 Dec 2014)
- (Uruguay) Daniel Carreño (1 Dec 2014 – 1 June 2015)
- (Italy) Gianfranco Zola (11 July 2015 – 27 June 2016)
- (Uruguay) Gerardo Pelusso (28 June 2016 – 1 November 2016)
- (Algeria) Kamal Akhlaf (2 November 2016 – 15 November 2016)
- (Brazil) Edison Aguirre (16 November 2016 – 19 January 2017)
- (Brazil) Oswaldo de Oliveira (20 January 2017 – 3 June 2017)
- (Tunisia) Kais Yâakoubi (9 July 2017 – 9 November 2017)
- (Croatia) Luka Bonačić (10 November 2017 – 8 October 2018)
- (Tunisia) Hatem Almoadab (9 October 2018 – 9 December 2018)
- (Iceland) Heimir Hallgrímsson (10 December 2018 – 30 Jun 2021)
- (Qatar) Younes Ali (1 July 2021 – )

=== Management ===
Position	Staff
President	Sheikh Khalifa bin Hamad bin Jaber Al-Thani
general secretary	Talal Al-Kuwari
Director General	Faleh Al Hader

Last updated: 8 October 2011
Source: Board of Directors

=== Presidents ===
- (Qatar) Meqbel bin Ali Al-Hitmi (1972–76)
- (Qatar) Abdulrahman Al Jaber Muftah (1976–78)
- (Qatar) Sultan Khaled Al-Suwaidi (1978–88)
- (Qatar) Dr. Abdullah Yusuf Al-Mal (1988–00)
- (Qatar) Sheikh Jassim bin Fahad bin Jassim Al-Thani (2000–01)
- (Qatar) Sheikh Khalifa bin Hamad bin Jaber Al-Thani (2001–02)
- (Qatar) Sheikh Falah bin Jassim Al-Thani (2002–06)
- (Qatar) Sheikh Faisal bin Mubarak Al-Thani (2006–09)
- (Qatar) Dr. Abdullah Yusuf Al-Mal (2009–12)
- (Qatar) Hitmi bin Ali Al-Hitmi (2012–2016)
- (Qatar) Sheikh Khalifa bin Hamad bin Jaber Al-Thani (2016–2020)
- (Qatar) Sheikh Tamim bin Fahad bin Jaber Al-Thani (2020–)

== See also ==
- Al Arabi Qatar (handball)
- Al Arabi Qatar (volleyball)
