= Cabralzinho (footballer) =

Brazilian footballer and manager (born 1945)

Personal information
- Full name: Carlos Roberto Ferreira Cabral
- Date of birth: 2 January 1945 (age 81)
- Place of birth: Santos, Brazil
- Height: 5 ft 7 in (1.70 m)

Senior career*
Years	Team	Apps	(Gls)
1961–1963	Santos		
1964	São Bento		
1964–1967	Bangu		
1967	Houston Stars	7	(2)
1967	Fluminense		
1968–1971	Palmeiras		
1971	Flamengo		

Managerial career
- 1979: Santa Helena
- 1982–1984: Santos U20
- 1984: São Paulo U20
- 1984: São Bento
- 1984–1986: Al Arabi
- 1985: Qatar U17
- 1987–1988: Mogi Mirim
- 1988: Al-Shamal
- 1989: Qatar
- 1989–1990: Al Sadd
- 1991: Santos
- 1991–1993: Saudi Arabia U20
- 1993–1994: Al Rayyan
- 1995: Portuguesa
- 1995: Santos
- 1996: Guarani
- 1996: Paranaense
- 1996: Goiás
- 1997: São José
- 1997: Al Ain
- 1998: Liga de Quito
- 1998: Al Ahli (KSA)
- 1999: Hajer
- 1999–2001: Al Qadisiyah
- 2001: Santos
- 2002: Figueirense
- 2002–2003: Zamalek
- 2003–2004: Al Arabi
- 2004–2005: Zamalek
- 2006: Campinense
- 2007: Espérance
- 2008: Espérance
- 2009–2010: Al-Ittihad Al-Sakndary
- * Club domestic league appearances and goals

Carlos Roberto Ferreira Cabral (born 2 January 1945) is a Brazilian former football player and manager nicknamed Cabralzinho who last managed Espérance of Tunisia, a position he held from May 2008 to November 2008. He previously managed Espérance in 2007.

== Career ==
=== Playing career ===
Cabralzinho played for Santos, São Bento, Fluminense, Palmeiras and Bangu, with which he won the state championship of Rio de Janeiro, the Campeonato Carioca of 1966. He was also part of the Bangu side that participated in 1967 under the name of Houston Stars in the championship of the United Soccer Association.

=== Management career ===
He began his coaching career in 1979, and previous clubs include Santos in Brazil (1995) and Zamalek in Egypt for two spells - between 2002 and 2003 and between 2004 and 2005. While at Zamalek he reportedly turned down offers from rivals Al-Ahly, as well as the Egyptian national side.

September 2009 Cabral named Al-Ittihad Al-Sakndary new coach after the sacking of Egyptian coach Taha Basry, His first match was against former team Zamalek.
