= Morteza Kermani Moghaddam =

Iranian footballer

Personal information
- Full name: Morteza Kermani Moghaddam
- Date of birth: 11 July 1965 (age 61)
- Place of birth: Tehran, Iran
- Position: Midfielder

Senior career*
Years	Team	Apps	(Gls)
1985–1987	Bonyad Shahid		
1987–1989	Persepolis		
1990–1991	Al-Gharafa		
1991	Persepolis		
1992–1995	Al-Gharafa		
1995–1996	Persepolis		
1996–1998	Keshavarz		

International career
1987–1992	Iran	24	(3)

Managerial career
- 2010: Aboumoslem (Assistant)
- 2011–2012: Paykan (Assistant)
- 2012–2013: Zob Ahan (Assistant)
- 2013–2014: Paykan (Assistant)
- 2014: Khoneh Be Khoneh (Assistant)
- 2015: Rah Ahan (Assistant)
- 2015–2016: Siah Jamegan (Assistant)
- * Club domestic league appearances and goals

Morteza Kermani-Moghaddam (Persian: مرتضی کرمانی مقدم), a.k.a. Mojtaba Kermani-Magham (Persian: مجتبی کرمانی مقام), is an Iranian former footballer. He is currently the assistant coach of Paykan. His nickname is the 'Iranian bebeto'.

== Personal life ==
On 5 January 2026, Kermani-Moghaddam publicly supported the 2025–2026 Iranian protests and responded to Ali Khamenei's characterization of protesters as rioters, stating: "Her name is not a riot, she is a girl who has no freedom and a human being who has no hope."

== Honours ==
=== Club ===
Persepolis

- Asian Cup Winners' Cup (1): 1990–91
- Iranian Football League (1): 1995-96
- Hazfi Cup (2): 1987-88, 1991–92
- Tehran Provincial League (3): 1987-88, 1988–89, 1990–91

Al-Ittihad (Al-Gharafa)

- Qatari League (1): 1991-92
- Qatar Emir Cup (1): 1994-95

=== National ===
Iran

- Asian Games Gold Medal (1): 1990

=== Individual ===
- Best Foreign Player Qatari League
