= Banco BMG =

- Formerly: Banco de Minas Gerais S.A.
- Industry: Banking
- Founded: 1930
- Headquarters: Brazil
- Products: Retail banking; payroll‑deductible loans

Banco BMG is one of Brazil's major retail banks. The bank, formerly known as Banco de Minas Gerais S.A., was founded in 1930.

Banco BMG had a minority share in a joint venture with Brazil’s Itaú Unibanco, called Itau BMG Consignado, which lent to customers who hold payroll accounts, until December 2016 when Itau bought BMG's remaining share.
