= Luisinho Lemos =

Brazilian footballer and coach (1951–2019)

Personal information
- Full name: Luiz Alberto Silva Lemos
- Date of birth: October 3, 1951
- Place of birth: Niterói (RJ - Brazil)
- Date of death: June 2, 2019 (aged 67)
- Position: Striker

Youth career
- 1969–1972: America

Senior career*
| Years | Team | Apps | (Gls) |
| 1973–1974 | America | | |
| 1975–1977 | Flamengo | | |
| 1978 | Internacional | | |
| 1978–1979 | Botafogo | | |
| 1980–1981 | Las Palmas | | |
| 1982–1984 | America | | |
| 1985 | Palmeiras | | |
| 1985–1987 | America | | |
| 1987–1990 | Al Wakrah | | |
| 1990–1991 | Al Sadd | | |
| 1991 | Americano | | |
| 1992–1994 | Qatar SC | | |

Managerial career
- 1994–1996: America
- 1996: Remo
- 1996: Madureira
- 1997: America
- 1998: Lagartense
- 1999: Itaperuna
- 1999: Bonsucesso
- 2000: Rio Branco
- 2001: Brasilliense
- 2001–2002: Al-Shamal
- 2004–2005: Al Seeb
- 2005: Vilavelhense
- 2005: Rio Branco
- 2006: Vilavelhense
- 2006–2007: Al-Shabab
- 2007–2008: Al Kharaitiyat
- 2008–2009: Hatta Club
- 2009: Al-Markhiya
- 2014–2015: Al-Markhiya
- 2018–2019: America
- * Club domestic league appearances and goals

Luiz "Luisinho" Alberto Silva Lemos, also known as Luisinho Tombo (October 3, 1951 – June 2, 2019) was a Brazilian footballer and coach, who played as a forward and started his professional career at America.

While at America, Luizinho was a key player during the most glorious period of the team's history. His 311 goals make him the club's top scorer ever. He was the top goalscorer for the Rio State Championship in 1974 and 1983, playing at America. He also played for Flamengo, Internacional, Botafogo, UD Las Palmas, and Palmeiras.

He scored 434 goals in his career. He finished his career in America in 1987 after having disagreements with America's manager Vanderlei Luxemburgo. He then finished the rest of his playing career with Qatar SC.

== Honours ==
=== Player ===
- Taça Guanabara: 1974
- Tournament of the Champions 1982
- Taça Rio 1982

=== Manager ===
- Campeonato Carioca Série B1: 2018

== Achievements ==
- Rio State Championship's top scorer: 1974 and 1983
