= Hypera Pharma =

Brazilian pharmaceutical

Hypera S.A.
- Company type: Public (Sociedade Anônima)
- Traded as: B3: HYPE3; Ibovespa Component
- Industry: Pharmaceutical
- Founded: 2001; 25 years ago (as Prátika Industrial)
- Headquarters: São Paulo, Brazil
- Key people: Breno Oliveira, (CEO)
- Products: Drugs; Healthcare; Cosmetics
- Revenue: ▲US$ 1.1 billion (2017)
- Net income: ▼US$ 297.8 million (2017)
- Number of employees: 7,515 (Dec 2019)
- Subsidiaries: Mantecorp
- Website: www.hyperapharma.com.br

Hypera Pharma is a Brazilian multinational pharmaceutical company and is the largest Brazilian pharmaceutical company by market capitalization. Headquartered in São Paulo, its business include pharmaceuticals, consumer healthcare and cosmetics products, and biotechnology products.
