= René Simões =

Brazilian football manager

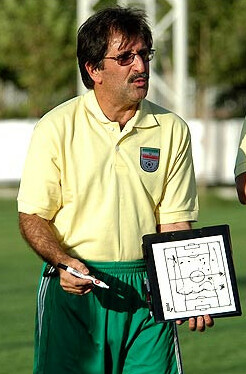
- 2006 Mehr News Agency

Personal information
- Full name: René Rodrigues Simões
- Date of birth: 17 December 1952 (age 73)
- Place of birth: Rio de Janeiro, Brazil

Managerial career
- Years: Team
- 1978–1979: Serrano
- 1980–1981: Olaria
- 1981–1982: Fluminense (U-23)
- 1982–1985: Al Qadsia
- 1985: Mesquita
- 1986–1987: Portuguesa
- 1987: Brazil Olympic
- 1987: Vitória de Guimarães
- 1988: Brazil U-17
- 1988: Brazil U-20
- 1989: Bahia
- 1989: Al Haiah
- 1990–1991: Al-Rayyan
- 1991: Ferroviária
- 1991–1992: Ponte Preta
- 1992–1993: Al-Rayyan
- 1993–1994: Al-Arabi (Qatar)
- 1994–2000: Jamaica
- 2001–2002: Trinidad and Tobago
- 2003: Honduras
- 2004: Al-Khor
- 2004: Brazil Women
- 2005: Vitória
- 2006: Iran U-23
- 2006: Santa Cruz
- 2006: Vila Nova
- 2007: Coritiba
- 2008: Jamaica
- 2008–2009: Fluminense
- 2009: Coritiba
- 2009: Portuguesa
- 2009: Costa Rica
- 2010: Ceará
- 2010–2011: Atlético Goianiense
- 2011: Bahia
- 2011: Barueri
- 2013: Atlético Goianiense
- 2015: Botafogo
- 2015: Figueirense
- 2017: Macaé

René Rodrigues Simões (born 17 December 1952) is a Brazilian former professional football manager.

== Coaching career ==
Born in Rio de Janeiro, he guided Jamaica national team to the World Cup in France in 1998. This was Jamaica's first, and to date, only appearance in the final stages of a World Cup, as well as making Jamaica the first English speaking Caribbean country to qualify for the World Cup. His squad was made up of a few English players of Jamaican parentage, and they were dubbed 'The Reggae Boyz' in the English media.

In the 2004 Summer Olympics, he won the silver medal with the Brazil women's national team. He has also previously coached Trinidad and Tobago. In 2006, he was the head coach and manager of Iran U-23 national team. In 2007 Simões then returned to Brazil to coach Série B Coritiba, where he won the second division. He left Coritiba in November 2008 to accept the position as Jamaica's Technical Director for the 2010 World Cup qualifying campaign. On 11 September 2008 Renê Simões was fired by the Jamaica Football Federation after just nine months in charge due to the country's poor performance in World Cup qualifiers. On 2 October 2008, he was appointed to manage Fluminense and was released on 6 March 2009. Simões then returned to Coritiba at the start of the 2009 Brasileiro but was released after four months, when the club fell to the relegation zone. He then moved to Serie B Portuguesa in São Paulo but Simões resigned in August 2009 after only two weeks as coach of second-division Portuguesa in Brazil, after saying armed men threatened the players in the locker room after a loss. He was appointed as the head coach of the Costa Rica national team on 16 September 2009 after former coach Rodrigo Kenton was sacked due to poor performance in the World Cup Qualifiers for South Africa 2010.

On 20 December 2009, Ceará officially signed Simões as the club's new manager, substituting PC Gusmão who didn't renew with the Brazilian club.

On 31 July 2010, he was announced as the new manager of Atlético Goianiense.

On 10 April 2011, he was announced as the new manager of Bahia.

On 16 February 2012, Simões became director of youth academy of São Paulo. In Cotia, city where the academy is localized, he created the Padrão São Paulo de Qualidade, that tries to improve the footballers formation into the club. On 7 November 2012, however, Simões left this employ.

After a long time away from football, Simões made his return as the coach of Botafogo for the 2015 season.

After coaching Macaé in 2017, Simões retired from coaching and became an advisor for football coaches in Brazil.

== Coaching honors ==
- 1988 South American Youth Championship with Brazil national under-20 football team
- 1990 Qatari League with Al-Rayyan Sports Club
- 1990 Sheikh Jassem Cup with Al-Rayyan Sports Club
- 1997 Jamaica qualified for the 1998 World Cup
- 1998 Jamaica came 4th in the Gold Cup
- 1998 Jamaica won the Caribbean Cup
- 2004 Athens Olympics Silver Medal with Brazil women's national football team
- 2006 Asian Games Bronze medal with Iran national under-23 football team
- 2007 Coritiba - Campeonato Brasileiro Série B (Brazilian league second division) champion
