= Abd al-Rahman =

Abd al-Rahman عبد الرحمن
- Pronunciation: Áb-dur-ráh-mán or Áb-dál-ráh-mán
- Gender: Male
- Language: Arabic

Origin
- Language: Arabic
- Origin: 'Abd + Ar-Rahman
- Meaning: Servant of the Most Gracious
- Region of origin: 7th-century Arabian Peninsula

Other names
- Related names: Amat al-Rahman (female variant), Rahman
- See also: Abdur Rahim, Abdullah

Abd al-Rahman (Arabic: عبد الرحمن or occasionally عبد الرحمان; DMG ʿAbd ar-Raḥman) and variants, is a masculine given name and surname of Arabic origin. It is built from the Arabic words Abd, al- and Rahman. The name means "servant of the most gracious", ar-Rahman being one of the names of God in the Qur'an, which give rise to the Muslim theophoric names.

The initial vowel [a] of definite article al- is unstressed, and can be transliterated by almost any vowel, often by [u] (hence ul-). As the [r] in Rahman represented by Arabic letter rā or Roman R is a sun consonant, the [l] phoneme in the al- is assimilated to it. Thus although the name is written in Arabic with letters corresponding to Abd al-Rahman, the usual pronunciation corresponds to Abd ar-Rahman. Alternative transliterations include Abdelrahman, Abd al-Rahman, Abdul Rahman, Abdur Rahman, Abdurrahman or Abdrrahman, Abd ar-Rahman, Abdulrahman, Abdur Rehman, Abdul Rehman, Abidur Rahman, Abdrrahman, and others, all subject to variant spacing and hyphenation. Certain transliterations tend to be associated with certain areas, for example, Abdirahman in Somalia, Abderrahmane in French-speaking North Africa, or Abdelrahman in Egypt. In Malay-speaking regions of South East Asia, it is often truncated as Deraman (pronounced [dəˈraman]).

Notable people with the name include:

== Given name ==
=== Abd al-Rahman ===
- Abd al-Rahman of Morocco (1778–1859), Sultan of Morocco
- Abd al-Rahman I (731–788), Umayyad emir of Córdoba
- Abd al-Rahman III (890–961), Umayyad emir of Córdoba
- Abd al-Rahman IV (died 1018), Umayyad emir of Córdoba
- Abd al-Rahman V (1001–1024), Umayyad emir of Córdoba
- Abd al-Rahman Khalaf al-Anizi (born 1973), Kuwaiti Islamist
- Abd al-Rahman ibn Aqil (died 680), early Islamic Arab martyr
- Abd al-Rahman ibn Abd Allah al-Arhabi (died 680), early Islamic Arab martyr
- Abd al-Rahman ibn Awf (581–654), Arab businessman and tycoon
- Abd al-Rahman al-Awza'i (707–774), Arab lawyer
- Abd al-Rahman bin Abdul Aziz (1931–2017), Saudi politician
- Abd al-Rahman ibn Abi Bakr (died 675), Arab military commander
- Abd al-Rahman ibn Muhammad al-Bistami (died 1455), Ottoman Sufi and intellectual figure
- Abd al-Rahman ibn Khalid al-Fahmi, Umayyad governor of Egypt
- Abd al-Rahman Fakhri (1936–2016), Yemeni poet and literary critic
- Abd al-Rahman al-Fasi (1631–1685), Moroccan writer
- Abd al-Rahman al-Fazazi (died 1230), Moroccan poet and mystic
- Abd al-Rahman ibn al-Dahhak ibn Qays al-Fihri, governor of Medina and Mecca for the Umayyad Caliphate
- Abd al-Rahman ibn Habib al-Fihri (died 755), Umayyad governor of Ifriqiya
- Abd al-Rahman ibn Utba al-Fihri, Umayyad governor of Egypt
- Abd al-Rahman Furaih (born 1957), Saudi historian, author, and academic
- Abd al-Rahman ibn Abd Allah al-Ghafiqi (died 732), Arab military commander
- Abd Al-Rahman Al-Gillani (1841–1927), Iraqi politician
- Abd al-Rahman Ali al-Hajji (1935–2021), Iraqi historian and academic
- Abd al-Rahman al-Jabarti (1753–1825), Somali–Egyptian scholar and chronicler
- Abd al-Rahman al-Jadiri (1375–1416), Moroccan astronomer
- Abd al-Rahman al-Jamal, Palestinian politician
- Abd Al-Rahman Ali Al-Jifri (born 1943), Yemeni politician
- Abd al-Rahman al-Kawakibi (1855–1902), Syrian Arab Nationalist writer
- Abd al-Rahman al-Kayyali (1887–1969), Syrian physician and politician
- Abd al-Rahman ibn Khalid (616–667), Umayyad governor of Homs
- Abd al-Rahman Abd al-Khaliq (1939–2020), Egyptian-Kuwaiti Islamic scholar and preacher
- Abd al-Rahman ibn Abd Rabb al-Ansari al-Khazraji (died 680), early Islamic Arab martyr
- Abd al-Rahman ibn Kathir al-Lakhmi, Umayyad governor of Al-Andalus
- Abd al-Rahman al-Maghrebi, Moroccan terrorist
- Abd al-Rahman al-Majdoub (1506–1568), Moroccan poet and Sufi mystic
- Abd al-Rahman Mannai (born 1948), Qatari playwright and director
- Abd al-Rahman Mowakket (born 1946), Syrian sculptor
- Abd Al Rahman Abdullah Ali Muhammad, Yemeni Guantanamo detainee
- Abd al-Rahman ibn Muljam (died 661), Arab Kharijite assassin
- Abdurahmon Mushfiqi (died 1588), Tajik poet
- Abd al-Rahman ibn Rabi'a (died 652), Arab general of the Rashidun Caliphate
- Abd al-Rahman al-Rafai (1889–1966), Egyptian historian
- Abd al-Rahman ibn Rustam (729–784), Arab Islamic religious leader
- Abd al-Rahman ibn Samura (died 670), general of the Rashidun Caliphate
- Abd al-Rahman Sanchuelo (983–1009), Umayyad military leader and minister of the Caliphate of Córdoba
- Abd al-Rahman bin Saud (1940–2005), Saudi prince
- Abd al-Rahman al-Shaghouri (1912–2004), Syrian Sufi poet, textile worker, and trade unionist
- Abd al-Rahman Shahbandar (1880–1940), Syrian nationalist activist
- Abd al-Rahman Sharqawi (1921–1987), Egyptian writer
- Abd al-Rahman ibn Nasr ibn Abdallah al-Shayzari (died 1193), Syrian author
- Abd al-Rahman ibn Habib al-Siqlabi, Abbasid governor of Al-Andalus
- Abd al-Rahman al-Sufi, (903–986), Persian astronomer
- Abd al-Rahman al-Tamanarti (died 1659/60), Moroccan judge and historian
- Abd al-Rahman ibn Umm al-Hakam al-Thaqafi, governor and military leader in the Umayyad Caliphate
- Abd al-Rahman Tsatsa (1756–1829), Nigerian Islamic scholar, teacher, and military leader
- Abd al-Rahman ibn Udays (died 657), Rashidun Arab military commander
- Abd al-Rahman ibn al-Qasim al-Utaqi (750–806), Egyptian Islamic scholar
- Abd al-Rahman al-Waghlisi (died 1384), Algerian Islamic scholar, author, mufti, and imam
- Abd Al-Rahman bin Ahmad al-Zayla'i (1820–1882), Somali religious teacher
- Abd al-Rahman ibn Ziyad, Umayyad governor of Khurasan

=== Abd ar-Rahman ===
- Abd ar-Rahman II (792–852), Umayyad Emir of Córdoba
- ʽAbd ar-Rahman ibn Muhammad (died 1825), Emir of Harar
- Abd ar-Rahman ibn Uqba, Umayyad Arab Wali of Septimania

=== Abdel Rahman ===
- Abdel Rahman el-Abnudi (1938–2015), Egyptian poet
- Abdel-Rahman Ayas (born 1968), Lebanese researcher, writer, journalist, and translator
- Abdel Rahman El Bacha (born 1958), Lebanese pianist
- Abdel Rahman Badawi (1917–2002), Egyptian philosopher and poet
- Abdel Rahman Swar al-Dahab (1934–2018), Sudanese politician
- Abdel Rahman Fahmy (1924–2002), Egyptian writer
- Abdel Rahman Farouk (born 1984), Egyptian footballer
- Abdel Rahman Abdel Hamid, Libyan military commander and prisoner
- Abdel Rahman Hassan (born 1992), Egyptian actor
- Abdel Rahman Hafez Ismail (1923–1984), Egyptian basketball player
- Abdel Rahman Magdy (born 1997), Egyptian footballer
- Abdel Rahman Magdy (TV presenter) (born 1988), Egyptian TV sports presenter
- Abdel Rahman Massad (born 1957), Sudanese Olympic athlete
- Abdel Rahman Ramadan (born 1993), Egyptian footballer
- Abdel Rahman Shalgham (born 1949), Libyan politician
- Abdel Rahman Shokry (1886–1958), Egyptian poet
- Abdel Rahman Sule, South Sudanese politician
- Abdel Rahman Al-Talalga (born 2003), Jordanian footballer
- Abdel Rahman al-Taweel, Libyan military officer
- Abdel Rahman Zuabi (1932–2014), Israeli judge

=== Abderrahman ===
- Abderrahman Ben Azzedine (1933–2026), Tunisian footballer
- Abderrahman Ibrir (1919–1988), French-Algerian footballer
- Abderrahman Kabous (born 1983), French footballer
- Abderrahman Sadik Karim (born 1962), Iraqi politician
- Abderrahman Ait Khamouch (born 1986), Spanish Paralympic athlete
- Abderrahman Ladgham (born 1947), Tunisian politician
- Abderrahman Naanaa (born 1965), Moroccan wrestler
- Abderrahman Samba (born 1995), Qatari track and field athlete
- Abderrahman Sebti (1916–??), Moroccan épée, foil, and sabre fencer

=== Abderrahmane ===
- Abderrahmane of Morocco (1778–1859), Moroccan Sultan
- Abderrahmane Abdelli (born 1958), Algerian musician
- Abderrahmane Alane (1970–2026), Algerian footballer
- Abderrahmane Amalou (1938–2021), Moroccan academic, lawyer, and politician
- Abderrahmane Ameuroud, Algerian-French accused terror financier
- Abderrahmane Anou (born 1991), Algerian middle-distance runner
- Abderrahmane Bacha (born 1999), Algerian footballer
- Abderrahmane Bechlaghem (born 1995), Algerian cyclist
- Abderrahmane Benamadi (born 1985), Algerian judoka
- Abderrahmane Benhamida (1931–2010), Algerian politician
- Abderrahmane Benkhalfa (1949–2021), Algerian financial expert
- Abderrahmane Boubekeur (1932–1999), Algerian footballer
- Abderrahmane Boultif (born 1987), Algerian footballer
- Abderrahmane Bourdim (born 1994), Algerian footballer
- Abderrahmane Boushita (born 1997), Moroccan judoka
- Abderrahmane Meziane Chérif (born 1938), Algerian politician and diplomat
- Abderrahmane Daidj (born 1975), Algerian fencer
- Abderrahmane Derouaz (born 1955), Algerian footballer
- Abderrahmane Diarra (born 1988), Burkinabe footballer
- Abderrahmane Farès (1911–1991), Algerian politician
- Abderrahmane Hadj-Salah (1928–2017), Algerian linguist
- Abderrahmane Hammad (born 1977), Algerian athlete
- Abderrahmane Hammadi (born 1984), Algerian track and field athlete
- Abderrahmane Hamza (born 1992), Algerian racing cyclist
- Abderrahmane Kaidi, British biologist
- Abderrahmane Kaki (1934–1995), Algerian actor, playwright, author, and director
- Abderrahmane Mahjoub (1929–2011), Moroccan-French footballer
- Abderrahmane Mansouri (born 1995), Algerian racing cyclist
- Abderrahmane Medjadel (born 1998), Algerian footballer
- Abderrahmane Mehdaoui (1949–2022), Algerian football player and manager
- Abderrahmane Meziane (born 1994), Algerian footballer
- Abderrahmane Meziani (1942–2016), Algerian footballer
- Abderrahmane Morceli (born 1957), Algerian runner
- Abderrahmane Mostefa (1947–2024), Algerian documentary filmmaker, photographer, and journalist
- Abderrahmane Mssassi (born 1985), Moroccan footballer
- Abderrahmane Nekli (1914–1990), Algerian diplomat
- Abderrahmane Rahmouni (1945–2020), Tunisian footballer
- Abderrahmane Sbai (1940–2010), Moroccan politician and civil servant
- Abderrahmane Sebbar (born 1940), Moroccan basketball player
- Abderrahmane Sissako (born 1961), Mauritanian film director
- Abderrahmane Soukhane (1936–2015), Algerian footballer
- Abderrahmane Taleb (1930–1958), Algerian revolutionary
- Abderrahmane Tamada (born 1985), Tunisian track and field athlete
- Abderrahmane Yousfi (born 1994), Algerian footballer
- Abderrahmane Youssoufi (1924–2020), Moroccan politician

=== Abdirahman ===
- Abdirahman Mohamed Abdullahi (born 1956), Somali politician and diplomat
- Abdirahman Dahir Adam, Somali politician
- Abdirahman Ahmed (died 2009), Somali politician
- Abdirahman Yusuf Hussein Aynte (born 1985), Somali politician and journalist
- Abdirahman Jama Barre (1937–2017), Somali politician
- Abdirahman Beyle (born 1955/56), Somali politician
- Abdirahman Eid Daahir (born 1985), Ethiopian politician
- Abdirahman Farole (born 1945), Somali politician
- Abdirahman Aw Ali Farrah, Somali politician
- Abdirahman Mohamed Abdi Hashi (born 1955), Somali politician and economist
- Abdirahman Ali Hassan, Kenyan politician
- Abdirahman Mohamud Haji Hassan, Somali politician
- Abdirahman Saeed Hassan (born 1997), Qatari athlete
- Abdirahman Mohamed Husen, Somali politician
- Abdirahman Hussein, Somali-American scholar and teacher
- Abdirahman Haji Aden Ibbi, Somali politician
- Abdirahman bin Isma'il al-Jabarti, Arab-Somali ancestor of the Somali Darod clan
- Abdirahman Janaqow (died 2007), Somali politician
- Abdirahman Mahdi, Ethiopian rebel and politician
- Abdirahman Abdi Mohamed, Somali politician
- Abdirahman Duale Mohamud (died 2012), Somali economist and politician
- Abdirahman Sheik Mohamud, Somali terrorist
- Abdirahman Haji Mumin (1930–1990), Somali politician
- Abdirahman Abdi Osman (1965–2019), Somali politician
- Abdirahman Dahir Osman, Somali politician
- Abdirahman Omar Osman (1965–2019), Somali politician
- Abdirahman Saylici (born 1956), Somali politician and businessman
- Abdirahman Ahmed Ali Tuur (1931–2003), Somali politician
- Abdirahman Abdishakur Warsame (born 1964), Somali politician
- Abdirahman Yabarow, Somali journalist

=== Abdourahamane ===
- Abdourahamane Diallo, Guinean physician and politician
- Abdourahamane Diawara (born 1978), Guinean swimmer
- Abdourahamane Soilihi (born 1959), French politician
- Abdourahamane Soli (1938–2016), Nigerien lawyer, politician, and author
- Abdourahamane Tiani, Nigerien military officer and politician

=== Abdramane ===
- Abdramane Ouattara (born 1986), Burkinabé footballer

=== Abdul Rahman ===
- Abdul Rahman of Negeri Sembilan (1895–1960), Malaysian king
- Abdul Rahman (Afghan cricketer, born 2001) (born 2001), Afghan cricketer
- Abdul Rahman (Afghan minister) (1953–2002), Afghan politician
- Abdul Rahman (Boost Defenders cricketer), Afghan cricketer
- Abdul Rahman (convert) (born 1965), Afghan convert to Christianity
- Abdul Rahman (footballer, born 2002) (born 2002), Indonesian footballer
- Abdul Rahman (GC) (1921–1945), Indian George Cross winner
- Abdul Rahman (Guantanamo detainee 357) (born 1976), Afghan Guantanamo detainee
- Abdul Rahman (Indonesian footballer, born 2002) (born 2002), Indonesian footballer
- Abdul Rahman (Vellore politician) (born 1959), Indian politician
- Abdul Rahman al-Aama (born 1987), Syrian veterinarian and politician
- Abdul Rahman Abanda (born 1990), Indonesian footballer
- Abdul Rahman Abbas (born 1938), Malaysian politician
- Abdul-Rahman Abdullah (born 1977), Australian artist
- Abdul Rahman Haji Ahmadi (1941–2025), Kurdish-Iranian militant leader
- Abdul Rahman Uthman Ahmed (born 1973), Saudi Guantanamo detainee
- Abdul Rahman Haji Ali (1913–??), Singaporean footballer
- Abdul Rahman al-Amoudi, Eritrean-American Muslim activist and criminal
- Abdul Rahman al-Amri (1973–2007), Saudi Guantanamo detainee
- Abdul Rahman Andak (1859–1930), Malaysian politician
- Abdul Rahman Arif (1916–2007), Iraqi politician
- Abdul Rahman Arshad (1936–2020), Malaysian academic, educator, and diplomat
- Abdul Rahman bin Hamad Al Attiyah (born 1950), Qatari diplomat
- Abdul Rahman Al-Awadi (1936–2019), Kuwaiti doctor and politician
- Abdul Rahman Ayob (born 1964), Malaysian admiral
- Abdul Rahman Hassan Azzam (1893–1976), Egyptian politician
- Abdul Rahman Baba (born 1994), Ghanaian footballer
- Abdul Rahman Bakar (born 1952), Malaysian politician
- Abdul Rahman Al Bakir (1917–1971), Bahraini independence leader and journalist
- Abdul Rahman Bakri (born 1965), Malaysian politician
- Abdul Rahman Ahmed Jibril Baroud (1937–2010), Palestinian poet
- Abdul-Rahman al-Barrak (born 1933/34), Saudi cleric
- Abdul-Rahman al-Bazzaz (1913–1973), Iraqi politician, reformist, and writer
- Abdul-Rahman Breesam (born 1959), Iraqi wrestler
- Abdul Rahman Bukhatir, Emirati businessman, media entrepreneur, and cricket administrator
- Abdul Rahman Dahlan (born 1965), Malaysian politician
- Abdul Rahman Daud, Malaysian politician
- Abdul Rahman al-Eryani (1910–1998), Yemeni politician
- Abdul Rahman ibn Faisal (1850–1928), Saudi King
- Abdul Rahman Ghaleb (died 2017), Pakistani terrorist
- Abdul Rahman Al-Ghamdi (born 1974), Saudi militant and terrorist
- Abdul Rahman Al-Ghassani (born 1990), Omani footballer
- Abdul Rahman Ghassemlou (1930–1989), Kurdish political leader
- Abdul Rahman Saif Al Ghurair (born 1959), Emirati businessman
- Abdul Rahman Gurning (born 1958), Indonesian footballer
- Abdul Rahman al-Habib (1920–??), Iraqi economist and politician
- Abdul Rahman Habil, Libyan politician and lawyer
- Abdul Rahman Halim, Afghan politician
- Abdul Rahman Abdul Hamid (1938–2022), Malaysian military officer
- Abdul Rahman Al-Hanaqtah (1963–2016), Jordanian politician
- Abdul Rahman Hashim (1923–1974), Malaysian police officer
- Abdul Rahman Nashi Badi Al Hataybi (born 1980), Saudi Guantanamo detainee
- Abdul Rahman Hilmi (died 1805), Ottoman calligrapher
- Abdul Rahman Ibrahim (born 1946), Malaysian footballer and coach
- Abdul Rahman bin Ibrahim (born 1954), Bruneian aristocrat, civil servant, and politician
- Abdul Rahman Heidari Ilami (1925–1987), Iranian Islamic scholar
- Abdul Rahman Infant (born 1952), Indian police officer
- Abdul Rahman al-Iryani (1910–1998), Yemeni politician
- Abdul Rahman Ismail (Sarawak politician), Malaysian politician
- Abdul Rahman Jabarah (died 2003), Canadian militant
- Abdul Rahman Jassim, Bahraini modern pentathlete
- Abdul Rahman Owaid Mohammad Al Juaid (born 1980), Saudi Guantanamo detainee
- Abdul Rahman Jumma (born 1969), Sudanese military officer
- Abdul Rahman Junaidi (born 1961), Malaysian politician
- Abdul Rahman Juma Kahm (born 1969), Afghan Guantanamo detainee
- Abdul Rahman Kamara (born 1989), Sierra Leonean footballer
- Abdul Rahman Kamudi (born 1955), Libyan politician
- Abdul Rahman Katanani (born 1984), Palestinian sculptor
- Abdul Rahman Khan (Azad Kashmiri politician), Pakistani politician
- Abdul Rahman Khan (East Bengal politician), Pakistani politician
- Abdul Rahman Khan Yousuf Khan (1925–2007), Indian politician
- Abdul Rahman Khleifawi (1930–2009), Syrian military officer and politician
- Abdul Rahman Kunduzi, Afghan politician
- Abdul Rahman al-Lahim (born 1971), Saudi human rights lawyer
- Abdul Rahman al-Mahdi (1885–1959), Sudanese politician and religious leader
- Abdul Rahman Mamudu (1937–1992), Nigerian Army general and politician
- Abdul Rahman Mohamad (born 1964), Malaysian politician
- Abdul Rahman Mokhtar (1958–2013), Malaysian politician
- Abdul Rahman Munif (1933–2004), Jordanian novelist
- Abdul Rahman Mustafa (born 1951), Iraqi-Kurdish politician
- Abdul-Rahman Nafad (born 2004), Egyptian footballer
- Abdul Rahman Noorani (born 1973), Afghan Guantanamo detainee
- Abdul Rahman Omar (born 1945), Kenyan sports shooter
- Abdul Rahman Orfalli (1989–2012), Syrian dissident
- Abdul-Rahman Othman (born 1942), Sudanese politician
- Abdul Rahman Mohammed Al Owais (born 1967), Emirati politician
- Abdul Rahman Pazhwak (1919–1995), Afghan poet and diplomat
- Abdul Rahman Umir Al Qyati (born 1976), Yemeni Guantanamo detainee
- Abdul Rahman Rafi (1936–2015), Bahraini poet
- Abdul Rahman Rahmani (born 2001), Afghan cricketer
- Abdul Rahman Rashid, Afghan politician
- Abdul Rahman Majeed al-Rubaie (1939–2023), Iraqi author
- Abdul-Rahman al-Sa'di (1889–1957), Saudi Islamic scholar
- Abdul Rahman Salama (born 1971), Syrian politician
- Abdul Rahman Saleem (born 1975), Iranian-British Islamic activist
- Abdul Rahman Saleh (prosecutor) (1941–2025), Indonesian jurist
- Abdul Rahman bin Abdulaziz Al Saud (1931–2017), Saudi businessman and royal
- Abdul Rahman bin Faisal Al Saud (1850–1928) (1850–1928), Emir of Nejd
- Abdul Rahman bin Faisal Al Saud (1942–2014) (1942–2014), Saudi royal, military officer, and businessman
- Abdul Rahman bin Musa'id Al Saud (born 1967), Saudi businessman and writer
- Abdul Rahman bin Saud Al Saud (1946–2004), Saudi prince
- Abdul Rahman Muazzam Shah (1780–1832), Malaysian Sultan
- Abdul Rahman Shahbandar (1879–1940), Syrian politician
- Abdul Rahman Shalabi (born 1975), Saudi Guantanamo detainee
- Abdul Rahman Sifeen (born 1974), Saudi footballer
- Abdul Rahman Ibrahima Sori (1762–1829), Fula prince and Amir who later became a slave in America
- Abdul-Rahman Al-Sudais (born 1960), Saudi imam
- Abdul Rahman Sulaeman (born 1988), Indonesian footballer
- Abdul Rahman Sulaiman (born 1988), Indonesian footballer
- Abdul Rahman Abdul Abu Ghiyth Sulayman (born 1979), Yemeni Guantanamo detainee
- Abdul Rahman Al-Sumait (1947–2013), Kuwaiti Islamic scholar, medical practitioner, and humanitarian
- Abdul Rahman Taha (1930–2005), Bruneian aristocrat and civil servant
- Abdul Rahman Taib (born 1942), Bruneian aristocrat and politician
- Abdul Rahman Talib (1916–1968), Malaysian politician
- Abdul-Rahman al-Tha'alibi (1384–1479), Algerian Islamic scholar, Imam, and Sufi wali
- Abdul Rahman Weiss (born 1998), Syrian-Greek footballer
- Abdul Rahman Muhammad Nasir Qasim al-Yaf'i, Yemeni CIA detainee
- Abdul Rahman Ya'kub (1928–2015), Malaysian politician
- Abdul Rahman Yasin (born 1960), American terrorist
- Abdul Rahman Mohamed Yassin (1890–1970), Malaysian politician
- Abdul Rahman Yusuf (born 1970), Egyptian poet
- Abdul Rahman Abu Zahra (1934–2026), Egyptian theatre, television, and film actor
- Abdul Rahman Al-Zaid (born 1959), Saudi football referee

=== Abdulrahman ===
- Abdulrahman Abdou (born 1972), Qatari football referee
- Abdulrahman Abdulkarim (born 1980), Bahraini football
- Abdulrahman Hassan Abdullah (born 1977), Qatari middle-distance runner
- Abdulrahman Abdulsalam, Bahraini cleric, academic, and politician
- Abdulrahman Al-Aboud (born 1995), Saudi footballer
- Abdulrahman Shuaibu Abubakar (born 1965), Nigerian accountant, businessman, philanthropist, and politician
- Abdulrahman Al-Ajlan (born 1986), Saudi footballer
- Abdulrahman Akkad (born 1998), Syrian LGBTQ activist
- Abdulrahman Akkari (born 1984), Syrian footballer
- Abdulrahman al-Akwa'a (born 1952), Yemeni politician
- Abdulrahman Alkhiary (born 1992/93), Saudi-American human rights activist and journalist
- Abdulrahman Alrajhi (born 1995), Saudi show jumping rider
- Abdulrahman Anad (born 1996), Qatari footballer
- Abdulrahman al-Ansary (1935–2023), Saudi archaeologist
- Abdulrahman Mohamed Babu (1924–1996), Zanzibari revolutionary nationalist
- Abdulrahman El Bahnasawy (born 1998), Kuwait-Canadian terrorist
- Abdulrahman Al-Barakah (born 1990), Saudi footballer
- Abdulrahman bin Abdullah Al Barrak (born 1956), Saudi academic
- Abdulrahman Bashir (born 1991), Nigerian footballer
- Abdulrahman Al-Bishi (1982–2026), Saudi footballer
- Abdulrahman Dagriri (born 1990), Saudi footballer
- Abdulrahman Al-Dakheel (born 1996), Saudi footballer
- Abdulrahman Dambazau (born 1954), Nigerian diplomat
- Abdulrahman Al-Dawla (born 1941), Kuwaiti footballer
- Abdulrahman Al-Dawsari (born 1997), Saudi footballer
- Abdulrahman Deria (1910–??), Somali Sultan
- Abdulrahman Al-Fadhel (born 1994), Kuwaiti rower
- Abdulrahman Al-Fadhli, Saudi politician
- Abdulrahman Al-Faihan (born 1986), Kuwaiti sport shooter
- Abdulrahman Fattahi, Iranian Islamic cleric
- Abdulrahman Abdulqadir Fiqi (born 1988), Qatari Paralympic athlete
- Abdulrahman Al-Ghamdi (footballer, born 1986) (born 1986), Saudi footballer
- Abdulrahman Al-Ghamdi (footballer, born 1994) (born 1994), Saudi footballer
- Abdulrahman Abd Ghani, Somali-Ethiopian politician
- Abdulrahman Ghareeb (born 1997), Saudi footballer
- Abdulrahman Gimba (born 1945), Nigerian politician
- Abdulrahman Al-Haddad (born 1966), Emirati footballer
- Abdulrahman Al-Harthi (born 1998), Saudi footballer
- Abdulrahman Al-Hurib (born 1992), Saudi footballer
- Abdulrahman Hamid Mohammed Al-Hussaini (born 1958), Iraqi diplomat
- Abdulrahman Ibrahim (born 1974), Emirati footballer
- Abdulrahman Mohammed Jamsheer (1943/44–2024), Bahraini businessman
- Abdulrahman Al Janahi (born 1994), Emirati tennis player
- Abdulrahman Al-Jassim (born 1987), Qatari football referee
- Abdulrahman Al-Jassim (Qatari footballer) (born 1993), Qatari footballer
- Abdulrahman Al-Johani (born 1988), Saudi handball player
- Abdulrahman Karam (born 2001), Kuwaiti footballer
- Abdulrahman bin Abdulaziz Al Kelya, Saudi judge
- Abdulrahman Al-Khaibari (born 1988), Saudi footballer
- Abdulrahman Khaled (born 1966), Bahraini modern pentathlete and fencer
- Abdulrahman al-Khalidi (born 1993), Saudi human rights activist
- Abdulrahman Khayrallah (born 1996), Saudi footballer
- Abdulrahman Kinana (born 1951), Tanzanian politician
- Abdulrahman Kuliya (1968–2021), Nigerian military officer
- Abdulrahman al-Mawwas, Syrian politician
- Abdulrahman Mesbeh (born 1984), Qatari footballer
- Abdulrahman Mohamed (Emirati footballer) (born 1963), Emirati footballer
- Abdulrahman Mohammed (footballer, born 1988) (born 1988), Qatari footballer
- Abdulrahman Mohammed (footballer, born 1994) (born 1994), Qatari footballer
- Abdulrahman bin Musa'ad (born 1967), Saudi prince
- Abdulrahman Al-Mushaifri (born 1998), Omani footballer
- Abdulrahman Mussa (born 1981), Kuwaiti footballer
- Abdulrahman al-Nuaimi (1943/44–2011), Bahraini politician
- Abdulrahman Al-Nubi (born 1979), Qatari long jumper
- Abdulrahman Al-Obaid (born 1993), Saudi footballer
- Abdulrahman Al-Qahtani (born 1983), Saudi footballer
- Abdulrahman Al-Qurashi (born 1997), Saudi Paralympic athlete
- Abdulrahman Ragab (born 1999), Egyptian footballer
- Abdulrahman Al-Rio (born 1994), Saudi footballer
- Abdulrahman Al-Roomi (born 1969), Saudi footballer
- Abdulrahman Saad (born 1996), Qatari basketball player
- Abdulrahman Mohamed Saad (born 1982), Qatari basketball player
- Abdulrahman Al-Safri (born 1993), Saudi footballer
- Abdulrahman Asipita Salawu, Nigerian academic
- Abdulrahman Saleh (footballer, born 1986) (born 1986), Omani footballer
- Abdulrahman Saleh (footballer, born 1999) (born 1999), Emirati footballer
- Abdulrahman Saleh (physician) (1909–1947), Indonesian physician and aviator
- Abdulrahman Al-Sanbi (born 2001), Saudi footballer
- Abdulrahman Mohamed El-Sayed (born 1984), American politician
- Abdulrahman Sewehli (born 1946), Libyan politician
- Abdulrahman bin Saad al-Shahrani (died 2015), Saudi Army general
- Abdulrahman Al-Shammari (footballer, born 1989) (born 1989), Saudi footballer
- Abdulrahman Al-Shammari (footballer, born 1993) (born 1993), Kuwaiti footballer
- Abdulrahman Adel Al-Shammari (born 1975), Saudi poet
- Abdulrahman bin Muhammad Al Shamsi, Emirati sheikh
- Abdulrahman Suleiman (born 1984), Qatari middle-distance runner
- Abdulrahman Taiwo (born 1998), Nigerian footballer
- Abdulrahman Thaher (born 1982), Palestinian-Jordanian actor, director, and journalist
- Abdulrahman bin Hamad bin Jassim bin Hamad Al Thani, Qatari politician
- Abdulrahman bin Jassim Al Thani (1871–1930), Qatari royal
- Abdulrahman bin Mubarak Al-Thani (born 1975), Qatari athlete and businessman
- Abdulrahman Al-Yami (born 1997), Saudi footballer
- Abdulrahman Ben Yezza, Libyan businessman and politician
- Abdulrahman Obaid Al-Youbi (born 1958), Saudi chemist
- Abdulrahman Al-Zaghaiba (born 2007), Jordanian footballer

=== Abdul Rehman ===
- Abdul Rehman (boxer) (born 1938), Pakistani boxer
- Abdul Rehman (coach) (born 1970), Pakistani cricket coach and player
- Abdul Rehman (Emirati cricketer) (born 1987), Emirati cricketer
- Abdul Rehman (footballer) (born 1982), Pakistani footballer
- Abdul Rehman (Indian politician), Indian politician
- Abdul Rehman (Kenyan cricketer) (born 1980), Kenyan cricketer
- Abdul Rehman (MLA Delhi), Indian politician
- Abdul Rehman (Pakistani cricketer) (born 1970), Pakistani cricketer
- Abdul Rehman (Pakistani politician), Pakistani politician
- Abdul Rehman (sprinter) (born 1929), Pakistani Olympic sprinter
- Abdul Rehman Jilani Dehlvi (1615–1677), Indian-Syrian Sufi saint
- Abdul Rehman Khan Kanju (born 1976), Pakistani politician
- Abdul Rehman Katki (born 1978), Indian Islamic cleric
- Abdul Rehman Khan (born 1952), Pakistani politician
- Abdul Rehman Khetran (born 1958), Pakistani politician
- Abdul Rehman Makki (died 2024), Pakistani Islamist
- Abdul Rehman Muzammil (born 1989), Pakistani cricketer
- Abdul Rehman Shakir Patni, Indian politician
- Abdul Rehman Rana (1942–2022), Pakistani politician and soldier
- Abdul Rehman Tukroo, Indian politician
- Abdul Rehman Veeri, Indian politician

=== Abdur Rahman ===
- Abdur Rahman (actor) (1937–2005), Bangladeshi film actor and director
- Abdur Rahman (archaeologist) (born 1934), Pakistani archaeologist and historian
- Abdur Rahman (Bangladeshi cricketer) (born 1990), Bangladeshi cricketer
- Abdur Rahman (Faridpur politician) (born 1955), Bangladeshi politician
- Abdur Rahman (footballer) (1919–1971), Bangladeshi footballer
- Abdur Rahman (make-up artist) (1946–2022), Bangladeshi make-up artist
- Abdur Rahman (Noakhali politician) (died 1981), Bangladeshi politician
- Abdur Rahman (Pakistani judge) (1888–1962), Pakistani judge
- Abdur Rahman (scholar) (1920–2015), Islamic scholar
- Abdur Rahman (Tangail politician), Bangladeshi politician
- Abdur Rahman Ajmal (born 1983), Indian politician and businessman
- Abdur Rahman Astrakhani (died 1545), Khan of Astrakhan
- Abdur Rahman Atiku (died 1902), Sultan of Sokoto
- Abdur Rahman Bakaul (1919–??), Pakistani politician
- Abdur Rahman Bijnori (1885–1918), Indian poet and scholar
- Abdur Rahman Biswas (1926–2017), Bangladeshi politician
- Abdur Rahman Bodi (born 1970), Bangladeshi politician
- Abdur Rahman Boyati (1939–2013), Bangladeshi folk singer
- Abdur Rahman Chowdhury (justice) (1926–1994), Bangladeshi judge
- Abdur Rahman Chowdhury (politician), Indian politician
- Abdur Rahman Chughtai (1899–1975), Pakistani artist
- Abdur Rahman Fakir, Bangladeshi politician
- Abdur Rahman Slade Hopkinson (1934–1993), Guyanese actor
- Abdur Rahman Hye (1919–2008), Pakistani architect
- Abdur Rahman Kashgarhi (1912–1971), Uyghur-Indian Arabic language and literature scholar
- Abdur Rahman Khan (1842–1901), Afghan Emir
- Abdur Rahman Khan (educator) (1878–1939), Bengali academic and education service officer
- Abdur Rahman Khan (politician) (1906–??), Bangladeshi lawyer and politician
- Abdur Rahman Khan (writer) (1890–1964), Bangladeshi educator and writer
- Abdur Rahman Khokon, Bangladeshi politician
- Abdur Rahman Mahmudi (1909–??), Afghan medical doctor and politician
- Abdur Rahman ibn Yusuf Mangera (born 1974), British Islamic scholar
- Abdur Rahmanel Masud (born 1958), Bangladeshi judge
- Abdur-Rahman Mubarakpuri (1865–1935), Indian Islamic scholar
- Abdur Rahman Peshawari (1886–1925), Turkish soldier, journalist, and diplomat
- Abdur Rahman Siddiqui (1887–1953), Pakistani politician, businessman, and journalist
- Abdur Rahman ibn Yahya (born 1937), Yemeni politician
- Abdur-Rahman al-Mu'allimee al-Yamani (1894–1966), Yemeni Islamic scholar

=== Abdurahman ===
- Abdurahman Abubakar (born 1990), Saudi-Qatari footballer
- Abdurahman Ali (footballer) (born 1993), Emirati footballer
- Abdurahman Ali (swimmer) (1911–??), Filipino swimmer
- Abdurahman Ahmed Ali, Somali politician
- Abdurahman Abdullahi Baadiyow (born 1954), Somali politician
- Abdurahman Čokić (1888–1954), Bosnian author and sheikh
- Abdurahman Al-Harazi (born 1994), Qatari footballer
- Abdurahman Khadr (born 1982), Canadian Guantanamo detainee
- Abdurahman Al-Korbi (born 1994), Qatari footballer
- Abdurahman Kujević (born 1982), Montenegrin Islamic religious leader
- Abdurahman Mesaad (born 1996), Qatari footballer
- Abdurahman Mohamud Turyare (born 1970), Somali jurist and military leader
- Abdurahman Waleed (born 1994), Qatari footballer
- Abdurahman Yousef (born 1993), Emirati footballer

=== Abdurrahman ===
- Abdurrahman Mahmoud Aidiid, Somali politician
- Abdurrahman Pasha Baban (died 1813), Emir of the Kurdish Baban principality
- Abdurrahman Başkan (born 1964), Turkish politician
- Abdurrahman Baswedan (1908–1986), Indonesian freedom fighter, diplomat, and writer
- Abdurrahman Buğday (born 1959), Turkish terrorist and organized crime leader
- Abdurrahman Canlı (born 1997), Turkish footballer
- Abdurrahman Shugaba Darman (1920–2010), Nigerian politician
- Abdurrahman Dereli (born 1981), Turkish footballer
- Abdurrahman Dibra (1885–1961), Albanian politician
- Abdurrahman agha Dilbazoglu, Azerbaijani poet
- Abdurrahman Mohammad Fachir (born 1957), Indonesian diplomat
- Abdurrahman Fatalibeyli (1908–1954), Soviet Army major
- Abdurrahman Gazi (died 1329), Ottoman warrior
- Abdurrahman Gök (born 1980), Turkish journalist
- Abdurrahman Gunadirdja (1926–2017), Indonesian diplomat
- Abdurrahman Iwan (born 2006), Qatari footballer
- Abdurrahman Ali Al-Jifri (born 1943), Yemeni politician
- Abdurrahman Yavuz Kalkan (born 1973), Turkish footballer
- Abdurrahman Melek (1896–1978), Turkish politician
- Abdurrahman Mustafa (born 1964), Syrian politician and businessman
- Abdurrahman Nokshiqi (1941–2000), Albanian ballet dancer and choreographer
- Abdurrahman Abdi Pasha (court historian) (1630–1692), Ottoman official and historian
- Abdurrahman Nurettin Pasha (1836–1912), Ottoman Turkish statesman
- Abdurrahman Sami Pasha (1794–1882), Ottoman bureaucrat and statesman
- Abdurrahman Sharafkandi (1920–1990), Iranian poet
- Abdurrahman Abba Sheshe (born 1965), Nigerian consultant surgeon
- Abdurrahman Shihab (1915–1986), Indonesian academic, politician, and Islamic scholar
- Abdurrahman Tutdere (born 1976), Turkish lawyer and politician
- Abdurrahman Vazirov (1930–2022), Azerbaijani politician
- Abdurrahman Wahid (1940–2008), Indonesian politician
- Abdurrahman Yalçınkaya (born 1950), Turkish judge
- Abdurrahman Az-Zahir (1833–1896), Hadhrami political, religious, and diplomatic leader

=== Abdur Rehman ===
- Abdur Rehman (cricketer, born 1917) (1917–2000), Pakistani cricketer
- Abdur Rehman (cricketer, born 1980) (born 1980), Pakistani cricketer
- Abdur Rehman (cricketer, born 1989) (born 1989), Pakistani cricketer
- Abdur Rehman Hashim Syed, Pakistani Army major

=== Abd-ur-Rahman ===
- Abd-ur-Rahman, 13th century Mongol administrator of North China

== Surname ==
=== Abd al-Rahman ===
- Abdallah bin Abd al-Rahman (1889–1977), Saudi prince and soldier
- Aisha Abd al-Rahman (1913–1998), Egyptian author and professor of literature
- Atiyah Abd al-Rahman (1970–2011), Libyan suspected terrorist
- Hashem Abd al-Rahman, Arab-Israeli politician
- Rauf Rashid Abd al-Rahman (born 1941), Iraqi judge
- Sheik Abd-Al-Rahman (died 2006), Iraqi cleric

=== Abdel Rahman ===
- Baha' Abdel-Rahman (born 1987), Jordanian footballer
- Gely Abdel Rahman (1931–1990), Sudanese poet
- Hassan Abdel Rahman (born 1944), Palestinian diplomat
- Lana Abdel Rahman, Lebanese writer
- Mayfa' Abdel Rahman (1951–2021), Yemeni short story writer and journalist
- Mohamed Abdel Rahman (fencer) (1915–1996), Egyptian fencer
- Mohammed Omar Abdel-Rahman, Egyptian CIA detainee
- Omar Abdel-Rahman (1938–2017), Egyptian Islamist and jihadist militant
- Safiya Abdel Rahman, Egyptian scout
- Sameh Abdel Rahman (born 1943), Egyptian fencer

=== Abdelrahman ===
- Abdelrazak Ali Abdelrahman, (born 1970), Libyan Guantanamo detainee
- Mohamed Abdelrahman (footballer, born 1993), Sudanese footballer

=== Abderrahmane ===
- Hadj Abderrahmane (1941–1981), Algerian actor
- Slimane Hadj Abderrahmane (born 1973), Danish Guantanamo detainee

=== Abdirahman ===
- Abdihakem Abdirahman (born 1977), Somali-American long-distance runner

=== Abdolrahman ===
- Muhammad Abdolrahman, Iranian physician

=== Abdul Rahiman ===
- Mohammed Abdul Rahiman (1898–1945), Indian journalist, orator, and politician

=== Abdul Rahman ===
- Abdu Ali Abdul Rahman, Yemeni diplomat
- Abdul Ghappar Abdul Rahman (born 1973), Uyghur-Chinese Guantanamo detainee
- Abdul Halim Abdul Rahman (1939–2022), Malaysian politician
- Abdullah bin Abdul-Rahman (1893–1976), Saudi royal
- Abu Abdul Rahman (died 2006), Iraqi-Canadian militant
- Ismail Abdul Rahman (1915–1973), Malaysian politician
- Mahdi Abdul-Rahman (1942–2011), American basketball player
- Mohd Shaffik Abdul Rahman (born 1984), Malaysian footballer
- Mohd Suffian Abdul Rahman (born 1978), Malaysian footballer
- Muhammad bin Abdul-Rahman (1882–1943), Saudi prince and soldier
- Norah Abdul Rahman (born 1959), Malaysian politician
- Omar Abdul Rahman (academic) (born 1932), Malaysian scientific adviser
- Permaisuri Siti Aishah Abdul Rahman (born 1971), Malaysian Queen
- Rozaimi Abdul Rahman (born 1992), Malaysian footballer
- S. Abdul Rahman (1937–2017), Indian Tamil-language poet
- Sa'd bin Abdul-Rahman (1888–1916), Saudi prince and soldier
- Senu Abdul Rahman (1919–1995), Malaysian politician
- Shamsurin Abdul Rahman (born 1986), Singaporean footballer
- Shamsurin Abdul Rahman (Malaysian footballer) (born 1967), Malaysian footballer
- T. Abdul Rahman (1934–2002), Indian footballer
- Tajuddin Abdul Rahman (born 1948), Malaysian politician
- Temenggong Abdul Rahman (1755–1825), Temenggong of Johor
- Tunku Abdul Rahman (1903–1990), Malaysian politician
- Tunku Abdul Rahman (Tunku Mahkota of Johor) (1933–1989), Malaysian prince

=== Abdulrahman ===
- Amer Abdulrahman (born 1989), Emirati footballer
- Asim Abdulrahman, Egyptian militant
- Basima Abdulrahman (born 1986/87), Kurdish-Iraqi civil engineer
- Fahad Abdulrahman (born 1962), Emirati footballer
- Hisham Abdulrahman (born 1982), Saudi actor
- Khaled Abdulrahman (born 1989), Emirati footballer
- Khalid Abdulrahman (born 1966), Saudi singer
- Mahmood Abdulrahman (born 1984), Bahraini footballer
- Mohammed Abdulrahman (footballer, born February 1989), Emirati footballer
- Omar Abdulrahman (born 1991), Emirati footballer
- Rashid Abdulrahman (born 1975), Emirati footballer
- Saeed Abdulrahman (born 1985), Qatari basketball player

=== Abdul Rehman ===
- Tufail Ali Abdul Rehman (1921–1975), Pakistani lawyer

=== Abdur Rahkman ===
- Muhammad-Ali Abdur-Rahkman (born 1994), American basketball player

=== Abdur Rahman ===
- A. F. M. Abdur Rahman (born 1951), Bangladeshi judge
- Akhtar Abdur Rahman (1924–1988), Pakistani general
- B. S. Abdur Rahman (1927–2015), Indian businessman
- Maulana Abdur Rahman, Indian politician
- Muhammad Abdur Rahman (born 1976), Pakistani judge
- Shaykh Abdur Rahman (died 2007), Bangladeshi terrorist

=== Abdurahman ===
- Abdullah Abdurahman (1872–1940), South African politician and physician
- Maman Abdurahman (footballer) (born 1982), Indonesian footballer
- Muriel Abdurahman (1938–2013), Canadian politician
- O. Abdurahman (born 1944), Indian Malayalam journalist

=== Abdurrahman ===
- Sayyid Abdurrahman (1831–1901), Dagestani author and historian
- Taha Abdurrahman (born 1944), Moroccan philosopher

=== Abdur Rehman ===
- Ibn Abdur Rehman (1930–2021), Pakistani journalist and human-rights advocate

== See also ==
- B. S. Abdur Rahman University, a private university in Chennai (Madras), India
- Datuk Patinggi Haji Abdul Rahman Bridge, a bridge crossing the Sarawak River in Kuching, Sarawak, Malaysia
- Expedition of Abdur Rahman bin Auf
- Ghulam Rahman (disambiguation)
- Mohamed Abdel Rahman (disambiguation)
- Omar Abdul Rahman (disambiguation)
- Princess Nora bint Abdul Rahman University, a women's university in Riyadh, Saudi Arabia
- Tengku Abdul Rahman (disambiguation)
