= Mohamed Abdel Rahman =

Mohamed Abdel Rahman (Arabic: محمد عبد الرحمن) may refer to:

- Mohamed Abdel Rahman (fencer) (1915–1996), Egyptian fencer
- Mohamed Abdelrahman (footballer, born 1993), Sudanese footballer
- Mohammed Abdulrahman (footballer, born February 1989), Emirati footballer
- Mohammed Abdulrahman (footballer, born September 1989), Nigerian footballer
- Mohammed Abdur Rahiman (1898–1945), Indian politician
- Muhammad Abdolrahman, Persian physician
- Muhammad-Ali Abdur-Rahkman (born 1994), American college basketball player
- Mohammed Omar Abdel-Rahman, Egyptian extrajudicial prisoner of the US
- Muhammad bin Abdul Rahman Al Saud (1882–1943), Saudi prince and soldier
- Muhammad Abdur Rahman (footballer) (born 2001), English-Pakistani footballer
- Muhammad Abdur Rahman (born 1976), Pakistani judge

== See also ==
- Mohammad Abdul Rahman Piut (1906–1971), Bruneian nobleman, teacher, and politician
- Mohamed bin Abdulrahman M. Hassan Fakhro (1906–1982), Qatari businessman
- Abdulrahman Mohamed (disambiguation)
- Abdulrahman Mohamed Babu (1924–1996), Zanzibari politician
- Abdulrahman Mohammed Jamsheer (born 1944), Bahraini businessman and politician
- Abdul Rahman Muhammad Nasir Qasim al-Yaf'i, Yemeni subjected to extraordinary rendition by the US
- Abdirahman Abdi Mohamed, Somali politician
- ʽAbd ar-Rahman ibn Muhammad (died 1825), Emir of Harar, modern day Ethiopia
- Abd al-Rahman
