= Abdulrahman Mohamed =

Abdulrahman Mohamed may refer to:

- Abdulrahman Mohamed (Emirati footballer) (born 1963)
- Abdulrahman Mohammed (footballer, born 1988), Qatari footballer
- Abdulrahman Mohammed (footballer, born 1994), Qatari footballer

== See also ==
- Mohamed Abdel Rahman (disambiguation)
