= Al-Anizi =

al-Anizi is a surname of Arabic origin. Notable people with the surname include:

- Abd al-Rahman Khalaf al-Anizi (born c. 1973), Kuwaiti terrorist
- Abdul Karim al-Anizi (fl. 2000s), Iraqi politician
