= Ghulam Rahman (disambiguation) =

Ghulam Rahman (Persian: غلام رحمان; transliterations vary), meaning "Servant of the Most Merciful", is a male Muslim given name in reference to Allah. Notable bearers of the name include;

- Syed Ghulamur Rahman Maizbhandari (1865–1937), Bangladeshi Sufi preacher
- Golam Rahman Shah (1938–1983), Bangladeshi politician
- Golam Rahman Sherpuri (born 1951), Chief Information Commissioner of Bangladesh
- Ghulam Rehman (born 1990), Pakistani cricketer
- Ghulam Ur Rehman, Pakistani Islamic scholar
- Ghulam Rahman, Bangladeshi government secretary

== See also ==
- Ghulam
- Abd al-Rahman
