= Abdur Rahman (Pakistani judge) =

Pakistani lawyer & judge (1888–1962)

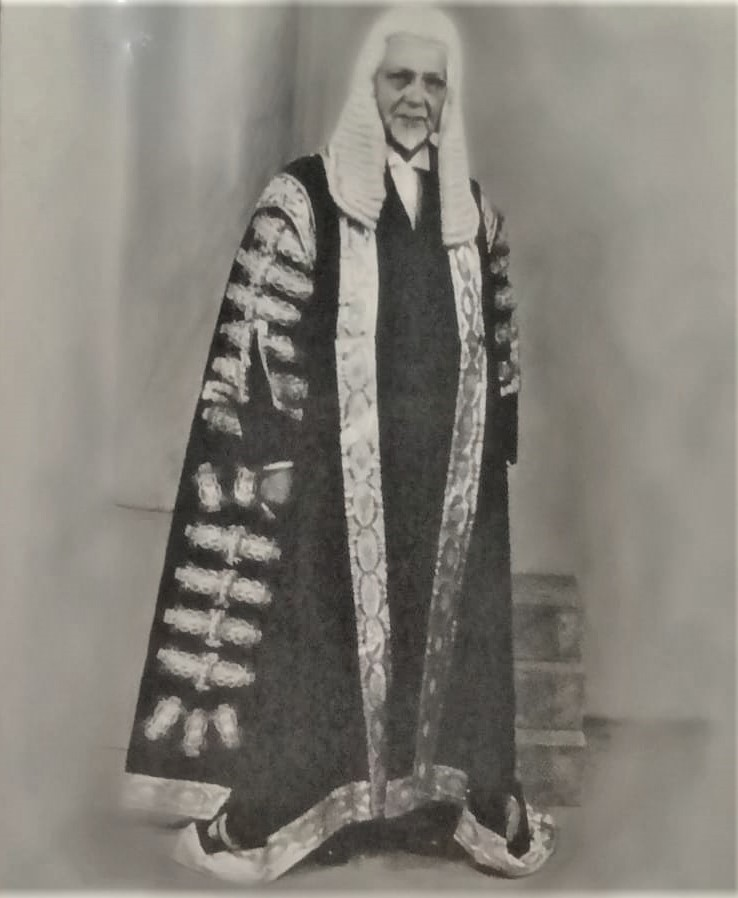
Sir Abdur Rahman: Judge on the Supreme Court of Pakistan

Sir Mohammad Abdur Rahman (1888–1962) was a lawyer and judge from Pakistan born in Delhi, British India. He served as the Chairman of the Delhi Municipality, the Vice Chancellor of Delhi University, Vice Chancellor of Punjab University, a judge of the Madras High Court, the Lahore High Court, and the Federal Court of Pakistan, and a representative of the country of India for the United Nations Special Committee on Palestine (UNSCOP) in the summer of 1947, . He was also the Chairman of the Rawalpindi Conspiracy Tribunal.

== Early career ==
Prior to joining UNSCOP, Rahman began practicing law in Delhi in 1908. He quickly rose in the ranks and became Dean of the St Stephens Law College (1927–1934), the Chairman of the Delhi Municipality, and later became the Vice Chancellor of Delhi University, a position he held until 1938. He was the first Muslim Vice Chancellor of Delhi University. He was then appointed judge of the Madras High Court in 1937, and then the High Court at Lahore in February 1943. and a judge of the Federal Court of Pakistan. Just a year later, he became Vice Chancellor of Punjab University in Lahore in addition to his High Court duties.

== Role in the United Nations Special Committee on Palestine ==
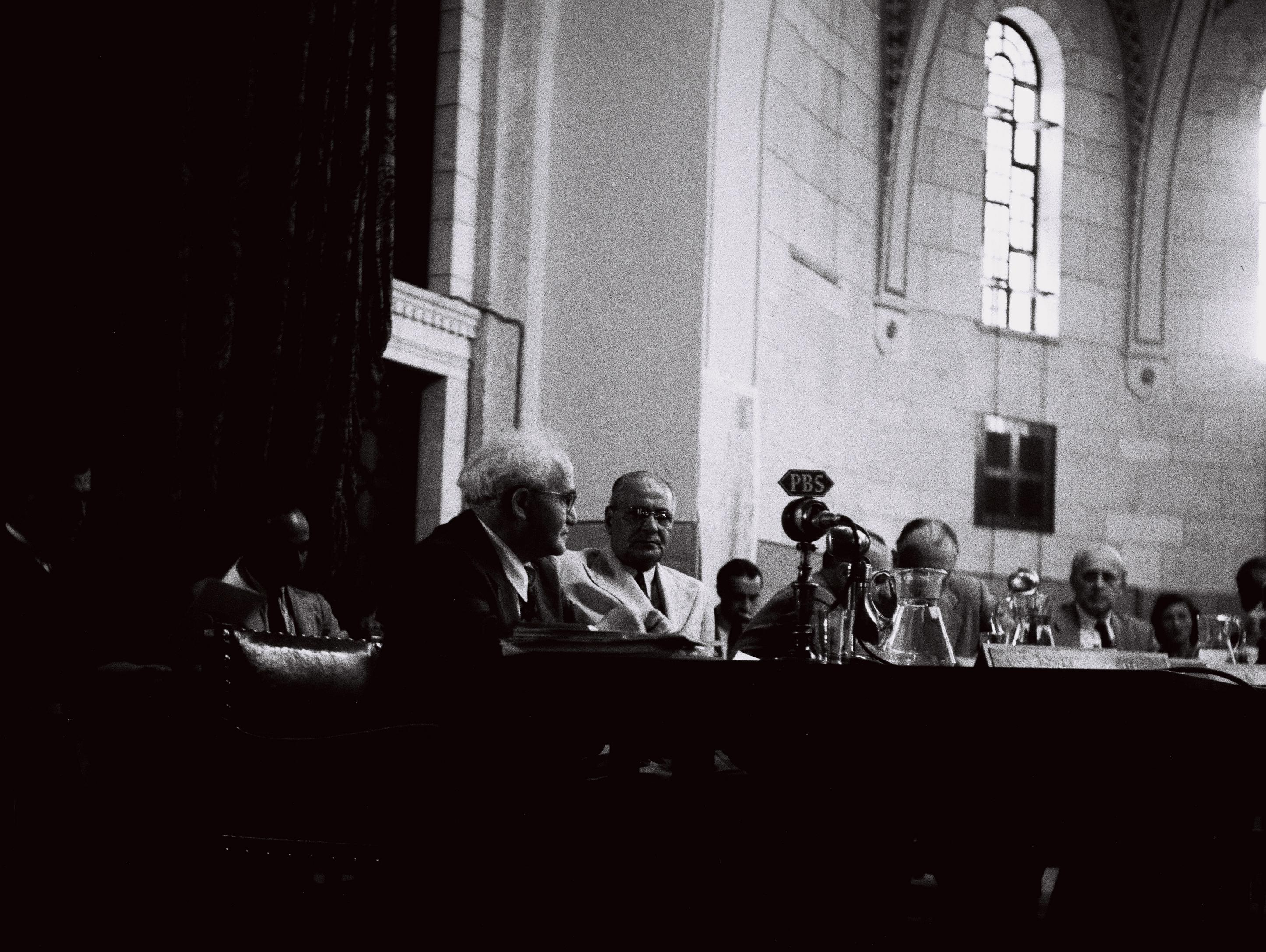
Meetings of UNSCOP at YMCA in Jerusalem (Seated in middle wearing a white suit is Sir Abdur Rahman)

In May 1947 he was appointed to UNSCOP by Indian National Congress President Jawaharlal Nehru. At the end of UNSCOP, Sir Abdur Rahman supported the Minority Plan for a Federal State in Palestine. He also included a Special Note that reflected his desire for either a Federal State or a Unitary state due to his belief in the sanctity of the spirit of the UN Charter.

After UNSCOP, Rahman went home to Lahore, which had become a part of Pakistan due to the Partition of India on August 15, 1947. His family, which fled from Delhi after partition, soon joined him. He was later appointed to the Federal Court of Pakistan, a precursor to the Supreme Court of Pakistan.

== Personal life ==
One of Sir Abdur Rahman's grandchildren is the award-winning chemist and former Minister of Science and Technology of Pakistan, Atta-ur-Rahman from Pakistan.. Sindh High Court Justice Muhammad Abdur Rahman is his great-grandson.
