= Abd al-Rahman ibn Abd Allah al-Arhabi =

Abd al-Rahman ibn Abd Allah al-Arhabi عبدالرحمن بن عبدالله ارحبی

Personal life
- Died: 10th of Muharram, 61 A.H. / 10 October, 680 AD
- Cause of death: Killed in the Battle of Karbala
- Resting place: Karbala, Iraq
- Known for: Being a companion of Husayn ibn Ali

Religious life
- Religion: Islam

Abd al-Rahman ibn Abd Allah al-Arhabi (Arabic: عبدالرحمن بن عبدالله ارحبی) was martyred in Karbala.

== Lineage ==
Abd al-Rahman was son of Abd Allah Arhabi. Arhab was one of the famous branches of the Shi'a tribe of Banu Hamdan. Abd al-Rahman was influential in Kufa who was among companions Ali ibn Abi Talib and Husayn ibn Ali. His name was reported in various ways as Abd al-Rahman al-Kudari, Abd al-Rahman ibn Abd Allah al-Arhabi, and Abd al-Rahman ibn Ubayd al-Arhabi.

== Companionship of Muslim ibn Aqil ==
When Husayn ibn Ali refused to give allegiance to Yazid ibn Mu'awiya and went to Mecca, the People of Kufa wrote letters to invite Husayn to Kufa. Abd al-Rahman ibn Abd Allah and Qays ibn Mushir were among those who were sent by the people of Kufa with 53 letters, as another report says, 153 letters or 50 letters to Husayn. The content of all these letters was inviting him to go to Kufa. They entered Mecca on the Ramadan 10 or 12, 60 or July 680.

In response to the letters of Kufians, Husayn decided to send Muslim ibn Aqil to Kufa in order to measure the extent of Kufan support. Muslim ibn Aqil was accompanied by Qays ibn Mushir al-Saydawi, Abd al-Rahman ibn Abd Allah, and Umarat ibn Ubayd al-Saluli in his journey to Kufa. After Muslim ibn Aqil was martyred, Abd al-Rahman left Kufa secretly and joined the caravan of Husayn.

== In the Battle of Karbala ==
On the Day of Ashura, Abd al-Rahman killed and injured some soldiers of Umar ibn Sa'd's army. He is considered among the martyrs of the first attack of the enemy. Banu Asad buried his body together with other martyrs of Karbala in the collective grave of the martyrs. His name is mentioned in Ziyarah al-Nahiya al-Muqaddasa as Abd al-Rahman ibn Abd Allah ibn al-Kudari al-Arhabi.
