= Omar Abdul Rahman =

Omar Abdul Rahman may refer to:

- Omar Abdel-Rahman (1938–2017), Egyptian leader of militant group, Al-Gama'a al-Islamiyya
- Omar Abdul Rahman (academic) (born 1932), Malaysian academic
- Omar Abdulrahman (born 1991), Emirati footballer
