= Abdurahman Čokić =

Abdurahman Adil Čokić
- Born: 1888; Brčko, Condominium of Bosnia and Herzegovina, Austria-Hungary
- Died: 1954 (aged 65–66); Tuzla, SR Bosnia and Herzegovina, Yugoslavia
- Occupation: Mufti

Abdurahman Adil Čokić (1888–1954) was a Bosnian Mufti. He completed basic education in Behram-beg's Madrassa. He was enrolled in Sharia tribunal school 1908 but soon left and went to Istanbul, where he enrolled at the Faculty of Theology and graduated in 1914. He then enrolled at the high school for different Islamic disciplines, which was completed 1917.

And just a year after returning from his studies in Istanbul to Tuzla, Čokić began to occur in notable Muslim newspapers. From then until 1945 he was a constant collaborator of many Muslim newspapers. Cooperation is especially prominent in his monthly Hikmet, which is in Tuzla started his regular collaborator 1929, and helps him in editing the paper. I was in New flowers Abdurahman Adil ef noticed associate. His works were published in Irsadu Gajret, Osvit and calendars Hope National and Croats.

Čokić was born in Brčko where his father was a teacher, and he died in Tuzla.
