= Abdirahman Hussein =

Abdirahman Hussein (born in Hargeisa, Somaliland) is a scholar and teacher who taught at the University of Tennessee in Knoxville. He is best known for his book on Edward Said, Edward Said: Criticism and Society (London: Verso, 2002), in which he offers a critical study of Said and his influences. The book was praised by Bart Moore-Gilbert for its "judicious critique" of Moore-Gilbert's own 1997 study of Said in which, he says, he did not pay sufficient attention to the "Palestinian dimensions and orientations of Said's thinking". Also noted is Hussein's "triangulation" of Joseph Conrad, whose Heart of Darkness is, according to Hussein, "foundational to Said's entire career and project". One of Hussein's focal points is Said's 1976 book Beginnings: Intention and Method, whose importance he says is overlooked.
