= Abdul Rahman Kamudi =

Libyan politician

Dr. Abdul Rahman Kamudi (Arabic: عبد الرحمن القمودي; born c. 1955) is a Libyan politician served as Secretary of the General People's Committee of Libya, as General Authority for Investment. Born in Benghazi, Libya, Kamudi was educated in universities in the United States. He holds a doctorate in management sciences from the University of Oregon and an MBA from the University of Washington.
