= Abdul Rahman Al-Hanaqtah =

Jordanian politician (1963–2016)

Abdul Rahman Al-Hanaqtah (1963 – 15 February 2016) was a Jordanian politician. He served as member of the House of Representatives in the 15th (2007–2010) and 16th Parliament (2010–2013). He was a member for a Muslim seat in the First District of Tafilah Governorate.

In 2012 he became rapporteur on the parliamentary commission investigation into alleged corruption in the Socio-Economic Transformation Plan.
