= Abdul Rahman Sifeen =

Saudi Arabian footballer

Personal information
- Date of birth: 12 June 1974 (age 52)
- Position: Forward

International career
Years	Team	Apps	(Gls)
- Saudi Arabia

Abdul Rahman Sifeen (born 12 June 1974) is a Saudi Arabian footballer. He competed in the men's tournament at the 1996 Summer Olympics.
