= Abderrahmane Nekli =

Algerian diplomat and ambassador

Abderrahmane Nekli (July 19, 1914, in El Kseur – February 8, 1990) was an Algerian diplomat and ambassador. He served as Adviser on Foreign Affairs from 1964, Ambassador of Algeria to Niger from July 26, 1971, to June 30, 1978, and Director of the Africa Department of Foreign Affairs of Algeria.

He was buried in the cemetery of Ben Aknoun in Algiers.

On July 12, 1999, the President of Algeria, Abdelaziz Bouteflika, in collaboration with Salim Ahmed Salim, Secretary General of the Organisation of African Unity, honoured his family in an honour roll in recognition of his contribution to African movement.
