= Abdulrahman Ragab =

Egyptian footballer (born 1999)

Abdulrahman Ragab عبد الرحمن رجب
Personal information
- Full name: Abdulrahman Mohammed Ragab
- Date of birth: 10 September 1999 (age 27)
- Place of birth: Egypt
- Position: Defender

Team information
- Current team: Al-Waab
- Number: 74

Youth career
- Al-Khor

Senior career*
Years	Team	Apps	(Gls)
2019–2023	Al-Khor	23	(0)
2023–	Al-Waab	13	(0)
- * Club domestic league appearances and goals

Abdulrahman Ragab (Arabic:عبد الرحمن رجب; born 10 September 1999) is an Egyptian footballer who plays for Al-Waab as a defender.

== Career ==
Abdulrahman Ragab started his career at Al-Khor and is a product of the Al-Khor's youth system. On 21 January 2020, Abdulrahman Ragab made his professional debut for Al-Khor against Al-Sadd in the Pro League .
