= Behram-Begova Medresa, Tuzla =

Behrem-Begova Medresa in Tuzla

Location
- Behram-Begova 1, Tuzla; Tuzla; Bosnia and Herzegovina
- Coordinates: 44.538604°N 18.654020°E

Information
- Type: Public, Co-educational
- Founded: before 1626 (exact year unknown)
- Principal: Admir Muratović
- Teaching staff: 45
- Enrollment: 500
- Average class size: 30
- Language: Bosnian
- Website: www.bbm.edu.ba

The Behrem-Begova Medresa is the oldest educational institution found in northeastern Bosnia and Herzegovina. Relevant historical sources suggest that it began operating before 1626. It was built in the Arab-Moorish style, and throughout its history it has been restored and rebuilt repeatedly.
