= Abdul Rahman Kamara =

Sierra Leonean footballer

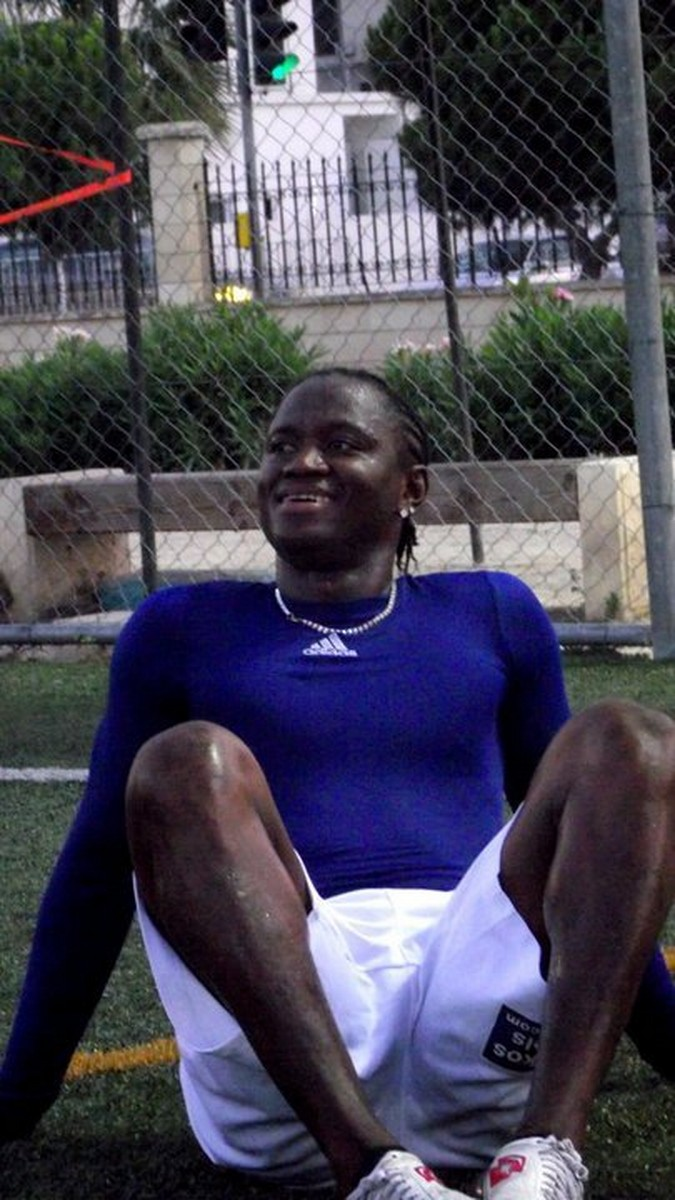
- Abdul Rahman Kamara 2011

Personal information
- Full name: Abdul Rahman Kamara
- Date of birth: 27 October 1989 (age 36)
- Place of birth: Freetown, Sierra Leone
- Height: 5 ft 8 in (1.73 m)
- Position: Midfielder

Team information
- Current team: ASIL Lysi
- Number: 40

Youth career
- 2003–2005: Kallon F.C.

Senior career*
| Years | Team | Apps | (Gls) |
| 2005–2008 | Kallon F.C. | | |
| 2008–2010 | Dynamo Pervolie | | |
| 2010–2011 | Enosis Neon Paralimni FC | | |
| 2011–Present | ASIL Lysi | | |

International career
| 2003–2010 | Sierra Leone | | |
- * Club domestic league appearances and goals

Abdul Rahman Kamara (born October 27, 1989, in Freetown, Sierra Leone) is a Sierra Leonean footballer.

== Career ==
Kamara is commonly known by his nickname Police.

=== Kallon F.C. ===
Kamara played on Sierra Leone National Premier League side Kallon F.C. five seasons until 2008.

=== Dynamo Pervolia ===
Dynamo Pervolia signed Kamara 2008 and he played there 2 seasons.

=== Enosis Neon Paralimni FC ===
Kamara signed a new contract with Enosis Neon Paralimni FC on August 25, 2010.

=== ASIL Lysi ===
ASIL Lysi signed Kamara on a three-year lucrative contract on July 22, 2011, at the Grigoris Afxentiou stadium in Larnaca, Cyprus.

== International career ==
Kamara represented Sierra Leone as part of the U-17, U-20 and U-23 National Teams. Before his senior team debut he has represented Sierra Leone in junior competition in the 2005 Meridian Cup taking Spain, Turkey, France and Portugal. After this he won three trophies, helped FC Kallon to eliminate Nigeria champions - Ocean Boys- in 2007, but went out of the competition by the present Ivorian Champion Asec Mimosas.

Abdul was part of the FC Kallon squad that played under 19 competitions in Italy and France the same year.

== Honours ==
=== Club ===
Kallon F.C.

- Sierra Leonean FA Cup
- Sierra Leone Champions 2006
