= Mayfa' Abdel Rahman =

Yemeni short story writer and journalist (born 1951)

Mayfa' Abdel Rahman al-Qiyadi
- Born: 1951
- Died: 3 April 2021 (aged 69–70)
- Education: Gorky Institute
- Occupations: Short story writer, journalist
- Writing career
- Notable work: The Literature of Modern Arabia

Mayfa' Abdel Rahman al-Qiyadi (1951 – 3 April 2021) was a Yemeni short story writer and journalist. He was known for short stories exploring the social and political realities of Yemen.

== Early life and education ==
Al-Qiyadi was born in 1951. He studied at the Gorky Institute in Moscow, where he obtained a Master of Arts (MA) degree in 1982.

== Literary career ==
Al-Qiyadi's literary work primarily consisted of short stories, many of which explored Yemen's social and political realities. His first collection of short stories was published in 1975, followed by a second collection in 1983.

His work was later published in English translation in the 1988 anthology The Literature of Modern Arabia, edited by Salma Khadra Jayyusi.

== Journalism and public service ==
Al-Qiyadi worked for the Ministry of Information in Aden. He also contributed to several Yemeni journals, including Al-Nidaa.

In 2010, as part of a court judgment against Al-Nidaa and several of its journalists, Al-Qiyadi received a three-month suspended prison sentence.

== Death ==
Al-Qiyadi died on 3 April 2021, reportedly after suffering a stroke.
