= Abdulrahman Hamid Mohammed Al-Hussaini =

Iraqi diplomat

Dr. AbdulRahman Hamid Mohammed Al-Hussaini

Iraq's Ambassador to Canada
- Incumbent
- Assumed office 19 February 2024

Iraq's Ambassador to Russia
- In office February 2020 – May 2024

Personal details
- Born: 22 November 1958 (age 67) Iraq
- Citizenship: Iraq
- Children: 5

Abdulrahman Hamid Mohammed Al-Hussaini is the Iraqi ambassador to Canada and the former ambassador to Russia.
