= Abdul Rehman Rana =

Pakistani politician (1942-2022

Abdul Rehman Rana Ex MPA
- In office 2008–2013

Personal details
- Born: 1 September 1942
- Died: 19 March 2022 (aged 79)
- Party: Istehkam-e-Pakistan Party (since 2023)
- Other political affiliations: Pakistan Muslim League (N) (2022–2023); Pakistan Tehreek-e-Insaf (2018–2022); Pakistan Muslim League (N) (2013–2018); Pakistan Peoples Party (2008–2013); Pakistan Muslim League (Q) (2001–2008); Pakistan Muslim League (N) (1997–1999); Pakistan Peoples Party (1993–1996); Pakistan Muslim League (N) (1990–1993); Islami Jamhoori Ittehad (1988–1990); Pakistan Muslim League (1985–1988)

Abdul Rehman Rana (born 1 September 1942 – 19 March 2022) was a Pakistani former politician and soldier from Jaranwala, the city of Faisalabad, Punjab, Pakistan.

== Personal life ==
He was born on 1 September 1942 in Bikaner Rajasthan the state of India. His father's name was Rana Abdul Sattar and his mother's name was Ulfat Begum. He is married and has five children.

== Army career ==
He was a member of the Pakistani Army between 1968 and 1988. He retired with the rank of major.

== Political career ==
He has been a Tehsil Nazim Municipal Administrator of Tehsil city or sub division Jaranwala. He became administrator for the first time by winning the elections in 2001 from Pakistan Muslim League Quied-e-Azam.

He did a lot of construction work, made the sewerage system better and built new governmental official buildings. In the next local bodies election in 2005, he did not get a ticket from his party PML-Q. So he had to run in the election by himself, which was the major cause for him to lose the elections for next term of Tehsil Nazim Jaranwala.

In 2008 he was elected to the Provincial Assembly of the Punjab as a member of the Pakistan Peoples Party.
