= Abderrahmane Sebbar =

Moroccan basketball player (born 1940)

Personal information
- Nationality: Moroccan
- Born: 1940 (age 84–85); Nador, Morocco

Sport
- Sport: Basketball

Abderrahmane Sebbar (born 1940) is a Moroccan basketball player. He competed in the men's tournament at the 1968 Summer Olympics.
