= Abdulrahman bin Mubarak Al-Thani =

Qatari athlete

Abdulrahman bin Mubarak Al-Thani عبد الرحمن بن مبارك آل ثاني

9th President of Al-Rayyan SC
- In office 17 December 2005 – 14 April 2014

Personal details
- Born: Abdulrahman bin Mubarak Al-Thani; 2 July 1975 (age 51) Doha, Qatar
- Height: 1.81 m (5 ft 11 in)
- Occupation: Athlete, co-owner of Qatar Racing Club, former president of Al-Rayyan SC & President of Kabaddi Asia since Dec 2024

Sheikh Abdulrahman bin Mubarak Al-Thani (Arabic: الشيخ عبد الرحمن بن مبارك آل ثاني; born 2 July 1975) is a Qatari athlete, businessman, co-owner of Qatar Racing Club and former President of Al-Rayyan SC. He is a senior member of the House of Thani. Now he's President of Kabaddi Asia

== Education and career ==
Al-Thani was educated at Qatar University, Qatar. He attended Oak Ridge Military Academy in Oak Ridge, North Carolina. He is an athlete and Co-Owner of Qatar Racing Club (QRC). In 2005, he was appointed president of the Al-Rayyan SC.

== See also ==
- Al-Rayyan SC
- Qatar Stars League
