= Abd al-Rahman Furaih =

Saudi historian and academic

- Born: 1957 (age 68–69); The seventy in Hail
- Education: Ph.D. in History and Civilization
- Occupations: Saudi historian, author, academic, and media person
- Organization: Member of the Saudi Shura Council

Abd al-Rahman Furaih, born in the town of Al-Sabaan in Hail in 1957, is a Saudi historian, author, and academic; a member of the Saudi Shura Council, and has many published books. He received a doctorate in history and civilization, took a course in management at the University of the Mediterranean in Malta, studied English in San Diego, California, US, and is currently a faculty member at Imam Muhammad bin Saud Islamic University in Riyadh.

== Life and positions ==
- He worked at the Arabic Language Institute at King Saud University in Riyadh.
- Worked in the Emirate of Hail Region: Director of the Department of Development and Coordination of Services, then Director of Public Relations, then Secretary-General of the District Council
- The Director of the Consultants Department then retired early (in 1426 AH).
- Member of the Shura Council during the period (1426–1430 AH).
- Head of the Cultural Activities Department at the Culture and Arts Association (Hail Branch)
- And Vice President of the Literary Club in Hail.
- Writer for Al-Jazeera newspaper.
- Participated in several seminars, conferences, and scientific meetings inside and outside the Kingdom and contributed to the arbitration of several books and research.
- He gave many lectures on thought, culture, history, literature, and development.
- Member of the teaching staff at Imam Muhammad bin Saud Islamic University in Riyadh – Professor of History and Civilization (collaborator).
- He was the Owner of the first forum (Cultural Salon) in Hail (Arba’i Al-Fraih).
- Member of the Saudi Historical Society.
- Member of the History and Archeology Society of the Cooperation Council for the Arab States of the Gulf.
- Member of the Union of Arab Historians in Cairo.

== Works ==
- "Mahaju Albahth Altarikhi Waruya Nakdeeya Fi Baath Almasadir Wa Aldirasat Alhadeetha" (The historical research method and a critical vision in some modern sources and studies) (Al-Maarifa Bulletin Publication)
- "Kifaar" (Wasteland), Published by the General Presidency for Youth Welfare (the General Sports Authority).
- "Banu Bakir Bin Wail Minthu Duhoor Alislam Hatta Bidayat Alasr Alamawi" (Banu Bakr bin Wael from the advent of Islam until the beginning of the Umayyad era) (Ibn Hazm Publication)
- "Alkabail Alarabiya Fi Khurasan Wa Bilad Ma Waraa Alnahr Fi Alasr Alamawi" (Arab tribes in Khurasan and Transoxiana in the Umayyad era) (Ibn Jazm Bulletin Publication)

== Published researches ==
• "Lamahat Min Tareekh Fadek" (Glimpses of Fadak's history).

• "Masader Altareekh Alislami Wa Naqd Alriwayat" (Sources of Islamic history and criticism of novels).

• "Alarab Fi Khurasan Wa Bilad Ma Wara Alnahar" (The Arabs in Khurasan and Transoxiana).

• "Ayam Alaarab Madat Altareekh" (Arab Days, history, and language literature).

• "Ntharat Fi Althakafa, Althaqafa, Almafhoom, Almalamih" (Looks at culture, the concept, the components, and the features).

• "Falin Alfinlandi Wa Ibn Alfarith Wa Suwar Min Shamalai Jazeerat Alarab" (Valin Al-Finnish, Ibn Al-Farid, and Tyre from the north of the Arabian Peninsula).

• "Zaroud Wa Shayateen Alshir" (Zaroud and hair demons).

• "Mantikat Hail: Banurama Almakan Wa Alssukan" (Hail region: a panorama of the place and the population).

== TV shows ==
• Presented the program of the forum on the cultural channel.

• Presents a program (History and Civilization) on the cultural channel.

• The historical agreement between Al-Hussein and Muawiyah.

• Meeting with Dr. Abdul Rahman Al-Fraih Al-Tamimi. Bayader Al-Majd Channel Program (1432 AH).
