= Abdirahman Sheik Mohamud =

- عبد الرحمن الشيخ محمود
- Born: 1991 or 1993; Somalia
- Years active: 2014-2015
- Organization: Al-Nusra Front
- Criminal charges: Providing material support for terrorism Perjury

Abdirahman Sheik Mohamud (Arabic: عبد الرحمن الشيخ محمود, 1991 or 1993) is a Somali former al-Nusra Front member accused of attempting to plot a domestic terrorist attack in the United States after training with al-Qaeda militants in Syria during the Syrian civil war.

== Early life ==
Mohamud was born in Somalia in either 1991 or 1993. He emigrated to the United States in Columbus, Ohio with his family at the age of 2. He became a naturalized citizen of the United States in February 2014 where he soon after applied for a United States passport.

=== Militant history ===
His older brother, Abdifatah Aden, joined Al-Nusra Front in Syria in May 2013 and sought to bring Mohamud to Syria to join Al-Nusra Front as a foreign fighter. In February 2014, Mohamud offered to give his brother Aden money before, two months later, he would travel to Syria with US$1,000 on tow to join Al-Nusra Front. He traveled to Syria after becoming naturalized citizen and applying for a passport, with his passport he would buy a one-way ticket to Athens, Greece, and then Istanbul, Turkey where he would travel across the Syria–Turkey border into Al-Nusra Front territory. While in Syria, he also worked alongside ISIS militants in training. While training in Syria, he learned several skills including how to break into houses, hand-to-hand combat, explosives and weapons training. Mohamud showed how he wanted to kill United States soldiers "execution style" while at the training camp, this led to a radical cleric at the camp to instruct Mohamud to go back to the United States to commit a terrorist attack with his new skills.

=== Arrest ===
On February 21, 2015, U.S. authorities arrested Mohamud in Ohio on charges of providing material support for individuals engaged in terrorism. After being arrested and put on trial, Mohamud pled not guilty to the material support charges and the plans to attack a military base in Texas or a prison. Mohamud was facing up to 38 years in prison. It was not until January 2018 where he would plead guilty to providing material support to terrorists and giving a false statement involving international terrorism in August 2015 where he was sentenced to 22 years in prison.
