= Abdul-Rahman Othman =

Sudanese politician (born 1942)

Ministry of Oil and Gas (Sudan)
- Incumbent
- Assumed office 2016

Personal details
- Born: 10 February 1942 (age 84) Khartoum
- Occupation: Politician, minister of oil & gas (sudan)

Abdul-Rahman Othman (Arabic: عبد الرحمن عثمان; born 10 February 1942) is a Sudanese politician. He is Minister of Oil and Gas.

== Specialized certificates and positions ==
- Graduate of Mechanical Engineering University of Khartoum 1967
- Bachelor of First Honors and PhD University of Birmingham – England 1974
- Professor of Mechanical Engineering, Faculty of Engineering, University of Khartoum and Coordinator of Agricultural Engineering Certificate
- Secretary of the College Council and Chairman of the Examinations Committee until September 1981
- Joined the Abu Dhabi National Oil Company (ADNOC) Al Ruwais Refinery as head of the engineering development department responsible for the design, procurement, contracts and implementation of more than four hundred small projects and twenty major projects within eight years, including expansion of the refinery from 120,000 to 220,000 barrels per day
- Participated in the development of labor systems, staffing limits and employment structures. He has vast experience in management, contracts, negotiations, security and safety

== See also ==
- Ministry of Oil and Gas (Sudan)
