= Abdulrahman Al-Jassim (Qatari footballer) =

Qatari footballer (born 1993)

Abdulrahman Al-Jassim عبد الرحمن الجاسم
Personal information
- Full name: Abdulrahman Ahmed Jassim Al-Jassim
- Date of birth: 1 May 1993 (age 33)
- Place of birth: Qatar
- Position: Defender

Youth career
- Al-Arabi

Senior career*
Years	Team	Apps	(Gls)
2013–2014	Al-Ahli		
2014–2015	Al-Shahania		
2015–2016	Al-Ahli		
2015–2016	→ Mesaimeer (loan)		
2016–2018	Al-Shahania		
2018	Muaither		
2018–2020	Al-Bidda		
- * Club domestic league appearances and goals

Abdulrahman Al-Jassim (Arabic:عبد الرحمن الجاسم) (born 1 May 1993) is a Qatari footballer. He currently plays as a defender.

== Career ==
He formerly played for Al-Arabi, Al-Ahli, Al-Shahania, Mesaimeer, Muaither, and Al-Bidda .
