= Abdurrahman Nokshiqi =

Albanian ballet dancer and choreographer

Abdurrahman Nokshiqi, known as Abi Nokshiqi (born 1941, Pejë – died 2000, Pristina) was an Albanian ballet dancer and choreographer. He was the first director of the Kosovo Ballet at the National Theater of Kosovo.

== Life ==
Nokshiqi had performed on international stages and had planned to premiere "Albanian odyssey" but was cancelled by Zoran Kosovac because it contained "Albanian nationalist elements". Nokshiqi also contributed to the ballet act "Nusja e Mergimtarit" (The bride of the migrant). Nokshiqi was the first director of the first group of ballet dancer of Kosovo who performed in 1972. In 1974 he was the assistant choreographer of Slavko Pervan.

== Death ==
He died in Pristina, in 2000.

== Works ==
- Idioti (The idiot)
- Borgjezi fisnik – lëvizjet dhe vallëzimi skenik (Noble bourgeoisie – the movements and scenery brotherhood)
- Minuku lozanjar
- Odisea shqiptare (Albanian odyssey)
- Gëzuar viti i ri (1976) (Happy new year 1976)
