= Abdel Rahman Magdy (TV presenter) =

Abdel Rahman Magdy عبدالرحمن مجدي (born 1988, based in Cairo, Egypt) is an Egyptian TV sports presenter, and the former Egypt national football team media officer.

== Career ==
In 2007, after writing in a few local newspapers in the sports section, Abdel Rahman began his real media career working with the Egyptian space channel, the channel that belongs to the government, as a sports TV reporter, reporting local league matches, sports events for different programs that were shown on the channel. After one year, Alhayat TV, Egyptian private channel owned by a rich Egyptian business man, was initiated, and Abdel Rahman was hired by them to work also as a sports reporter.

By the end of 2008 Abdel Rahman was promoted to be a sports TV presenter, presenting his first sports live TV show about European football once every week, in parallel to his job as a reporter.

In July 2010 Abdel Rahman moved to work in one of the most reputable Egyptian TV stations that are specialized in sports, "Modern" where he presented a daily show "Kora News" (Kora is the Arabic word for football). The period of working in Modern (a year and a half) was the most influential in his career, as it introduced him as a real sports presenter to the audience, and gave him enough space to express himself.

In October 2011, Bob Bradley was appointed as the new Egypt national football team head coach. The Egyptian football association offered Abdel Rahman the position of the team's "Media officer". Abdel Rahman resigned from his Job in Modern TV, and decided to take the job. In March 2012 the Egyptian FA decided the cancel the "Media officer" position, thus, Abdel Rahman went back to his main career as a sports presenter but in "Melody sports" TV channel, presented a daily show "Night Show" five times a week, two hours daily.

In August 2012, Bob Bradley asked the Egyptian FA to re-appoint Abdel Rahman as a media officer, consequently, Abdel Rahman took the job once again. After eight months on the job Abdel Rahman resigned after what was named "disputes" with the Egyptian FA board of directors.

In April 2013 Abdel Rahman started presenting "Mal'aab Al Asema" (Arabic word for "Capital Stadium") TV show on Al Qahera Wal Nas TV, five days a week for two hours every day. The program was put on hold, as well as all the sports programs, when the Egyptian league for 2012-2013 was cancelled by the Egyptian FA, and due to the political situation in the country.

Abdel Rahman also is a freelance writer for the reputable World Soccer Magazine, since July 2010, and was part of the Local organizing committee of the African Cup of Nations (CAN) 2006 which took place in Egypt as an editor in the Official CAF newsletter during the tournament.

Over the past 10 years, Abdel Rahman visited many countries: France, Germany, Tunisia, Qatar, Emirates, Georgia, Turkey, Saudi Arabia, Bahrain, England, Scotland, Wales, Spain, Sudan, Oman, Greece, Switzerland & Portugal, some of these visits were part of the Egyptian national team delegation, some of them were for other work purposes.

== Personal life ==
Abdel Rahman was born in 1988 in Riyad - Saudi Arabia, Graduated in 2009 from the Arab Academy for Science and Technology and Maritime Transport in Cairo where he earned a bachelor level in Marketing, with an "Excellent" grade and a degree of honor, was ranked 3rd among the students of this year.
