= Abd al-Rahman Mannai =

Qatari writer

- Born: 1948 (age 77–78); Qatar
- Known for: Playwright and theater director

Abd al-Rahman Mannai (Arabic:عبد الرحمن المناعي) a playwright and director, born in Qatar in 1948, he obtained the technical Secondary School – Electricity in 1969, some specialized courses, and English-language courses.

He is considered one of the founders of the theatrical movement in Qatar, where the first text he wrote was Umm Al-Zein in 1975, directed by Jordanian director Hani Sanubar. This play is the milestone in the history of the theatrical and artistic movement in the history of Qatar.

== Works ==
- 1975: "Umm Al-Zein"
- 1976: (The rest of the testament)
- 1976: "Hobil yalmal"
- 1977: "Al jarima" (the Crime)
- 1978:"Almoghanni wa al Amira" (the singer and the princess)
- 1979: "yalil yalil" (o night o night!)
- 1980: "al hidha' al dhahabi" (the golden boot)
- 1982: "al fil ya malik al zaman" (the elephant o the king of time)
- 1983: "ha alshakl ya zaefran" (this shape o saffron)
- 1983: "man yadhak 'akhiran" (who laughs last)
- 1984: "hikayat haddad" (a tale of a smithy)
- 1984: "anin alsawari" (the whine of masts)
- 1987: "qitar almarah" (the joy train)
- 1987: "al thaman" (the price)
- 1989: "al khayma" (the tent)
- 1990: "al muharij" (the clown)
- 1990: "al hadith walkayin" (the accident ant the creature)
- 1995: "rasayil bu'ahmad al huwayli" (Bu Ahmed AL Huwayli)
- 1999: "ghinawi al shamali" (the northern Ghinawi)
- 2000: "zakaria Habibi" (Zakaria my love)
- 2001: "mughram hal alshawq" (this longing is in love)
- 2001: "al khuyul" (the horses)
- 2004: "khaymat al eizi" ( the pride tent)
- 2005: "yahil al sharq" (the child of the east)
- 2006: "ahl sharq" (People of the East)
- 2006: "May waghilan"
- 2007: "halwasat" (hallucinations)
- 2010: "asfar alzabari" (al zabari travels)
- 2010: "al luwluat bayn al disha wa al qaffal" (The pearl between the beginning and end of the diving trip), 2012: "kark", 2015: "hunak" (there)

== Honors and awards ==
- Best Theatrical Technique Award "al motarashiqun" (The Crossroads), Carthage Festival Second Edition Tunisia 1985
- The Cooperation Council Medal at the Muscat Summit 1989
- Honoring a theater pioneer, the second Gulf Festival, Qatar 1990
- Best Integrated Theatrical Work Award "GHinawi al shamali" (the northern Ghinawi) Sixth Gulf Festival Muscat 2000
- The Jury Appreciation Award for the play "maqamat Ben Bahr" (Ben Bahr's shrines) Carthage Festival, third session, Tunis 1978
- Best Director Award "Moghram Hal Al-Shawq" (this longing is in love) Seventh Gulf Festival Doha 2002
- State Appreciation Award in the field of theatrical arts for the year 2006
