= Abdel Rahman Fahmy =

Egyptian writer

Abdel Rahman Fahmy (1 April 1924 – 17 October 2002) was an Egyptian writer. He has published several short stories as well as plays. Most of his short stories have been collected in two volumes: "Suzie wadh-dhikrayat" ("Suzie and Memories") and "Almulku lak" ("Thine be the Kingdom"). Fahmy has also worked for the Egyptian Ministry of Education and the Ministry of Higher Education. He was of Ethiopian and Turkish origin.
