= Abdulrahman Abdulsalam =

Bahraini politician

- عبد الرحمن إبراهيم عبد السلام محمد
- Born: Al Hidd, Bahrain
- Education: Bachelor of Arts in Sharia and Fiqh
- Occupation: politician
- Known for: chairs Islamic Consultative Assembly of Bahrain, vice-president of the Islamic Society where he serves as its imam, managing director and member of the board of trustees of the Royal Humanitarian Foundation
- Awards: Order of Sheikh Isa bin Salman Al Khalifa, second class

Abdulrahman Ibrahim Abdulsalam Muhammad (Arabic: عبد الرحمن إبراهيم عبد السلام محمد) is a Bahraini cleric, academic, and politician.

== Biography ==
Abdulsalam was born in Al Hidd. He holds a Bachelor of Arts in Sharia and Fiqh (Islamic jurisprudence).

He taught for the Ministry of Education, then worked for the Ministry of Foreign Affairs abroad in the United Arab Emirates and as secretary of parliamentary committees in the National Assembly, and supervisor of research and public relations at the Civil Service Bureau. In a series of promotions, he rose to director of legal affairs and media at the bureau, then its secretary, then liaison officer with the secretariat of the Gulf Cooperation Council, with his final title being director of operations and personnel services. He was appointed to the Consultative Council or Shura Council, the upper house of Parliament, in September 1996, and served there until 2014.

Abdulsalam chairs the Islamic Consultative Assembly of Bahrain, is vice-president of the Islamic Society where he serves as its imam, and serves as managing director and member of the board of trustees of the Royal Humanitarian Foundation.

== Awards ==
- Order of Sheikh Isa bin Salman Al Khalifa, second class
