= Qays ibn Musahir al-Saidawi =

Qays ibn Musahir al-Saidawi was an envoy of Husayn ibn Ali who headed towards Kufa carrying Husayn ibn Ali's message for the people about his intention to arrive there.

Husayn ibn Ali reached Al Hajir from the direction of Al Rumma, he handed over his message to Qays in reply to the letter he received from Muslim ibn Aqil regarding the people of Kufa who expressed their desire to support Husayn ibn Ali against the Yazid, their readiness came after they paid allegiance to Muslim ibn Aqil.

== Husayn ibn Ali's letter ==
Husayn ibn Ali in his letter to the people of Kufa which he dispatched with Qays ibn Musahir composed the following message : "Muslim ibn Aqil's letter reached me. In it, he informs me of your consensus to support us and to demand our rights; therefore, I plead to Allah to enable us to do what is good and to reward you with the greatest of His rewards. I have come to you from Mecca on the eighth of Thul-Hijjah; so, if my messenger reaches you, maintain your stand, for I shall reach you in a few days."

By the time Muslim's message reached Husayn ibn Ali about the betrayal he suffered, Husayn ibn Ali had already sent Qays with the reply of that message about his intention to arrive there. However within few days Muslim was captured and then killed by the order of Kufa Governor Ubaydullah ibn Ziyad.

== Arrest in Al Qadisiyya ==
Qays was captured in Al Qadissiya by the soldiers of Al-Husayn ibn Tamim al-Tamimi on his way to Kufa and was thus taken into court of Ibn Ziyad. Qays ibn Musahir was asked about the letter of Husayn ibn Ali, which before being captured he had shredded or eaten. Ibn Ziyad was curious to know the contents of Husayn ibn Ali's letter, he asked Qays for what did he shred the letter which Qays replied, in order to hide its contents.

== Ibn Ziyad's condition and Qays's death ==
When Qays refused to reveal the contents of Husayn ibn Ali's letter to Ibn Ziyad the latter then asked Qays to raise himself on the pulpit and praise Yazid and curse Husayn ibn Ali in front of everyone. If Qays did as he was told, Ibn Ziyad promised to spare his life; if he would not, Ibn Ziyad threatened to kill him.

Ibn Ziyad put forth his condition in the following sentence:

Ascend the pulpit and curse Al Husayn and his father and brother; otherwise, I will cut you to pieces.

Qays ascended the pulpit as directed by Ibn Ziyad and started his speech in the following manner:

O people! I am the messenger of Al Husayn (as) to you! I have left him in such-and-such a place; so, you should rush to his aid.

At the very same time Qays praised and glorified God and blessed Mohammad and his Progeny and was consistently imploring God's blessings on Ali ibn Abi Talib, on al-Hasan ibn Ali and al-Husayn ibn Ali. He then proceeded to curse Ibn Ziyad's father and all Umayyads; some accounts say he even cursed Yazid. This infuriated Ibn Ziyad, and he ordered his men to throw Qays from the rooftop of his palace. Qays succumbed to the injuries sustained in the fall. Some historians have recorded that Qays did not die immediately, so Abd al Malik Ibn Umayr al-Lakhmi slit his throat. When accosted, he replied that he wanted to put an end to Qays' suffering.

== See also ==
- Battle of Karbala
