= Abd al-Rahman Fakhri =

Abdulrahman Fakhri (1936 – August 21, 2016) was a Yemeni poet and literary critic. He was born in Aden and studied political science at the American University of Beirut. He served as Deputy Minister at the Yemeni Ministry of Justice and later as Adviser at the Yemeni Ministry of Culture & Guidance as well as Secretary-General of the Yemeni Writers Union prior to taking up a position at the United Nations Secretariat in New York from 1978 to 1996. He retired from the United Nations in 1997 and returned to live in Aden, Yemen.

Fakhri is highly noted as a modernist poet in Arabic. His first volume of poetry Etchings on the Stone of the Age came out in 1978, while his first book of criticism Words and Other Words was published in 1983. His poems have appeared in English translation, notably in Salma Khadra Jayyusi's 1988 anthology of modern Arabian literature. His other poetry books include "Out of These Songs Brought Sadness to Asfahani" published in 2000; and "From the Basket of the Butterfly", released in 2007. Abdulrahman Fakhri died in New York at the age of 79 on August 21, 2016.
