= Abdirahman Ahmed =

Somali politician

Personal details
- Died: 15 January 2009

Abdirahman Ahmed (died 15 January 2009) was a Somali politician. He was executed by an Islamist militia for alleged apostasy. He was tried and convicted by a Sharia court, but was not allowed legal representation according to his family.
