= Abdul Rahman Haji Ali =

Singaporean footballer (1913–?)

Abdul Rahman
Personal information
- Full name: Abdul Rahman bin Haji Ali
- Date of birth: 1913
- Position: Right-back

International career
Years	Team	Apps	(Gls)
- Singapore

Abdul Rahman bin Haji Ali (born 1913, date of death unknown), popularly known as Abdul Rahman, was a Singaporean footballer who played as a right-back. The national captain held the record for playing nine times in the Malaysia Cup final from 1933 to 1950. Besides football, Abdul Rahman was also a rugby player and athlete.
