= Abdulrahman Kuliya =

Nigerian military officer (1968–2021)

- Born: 2 February 1968; Kano, Nigeria
- Died: 21 May 2021 (aged 53); Kaduna, Nigeria
- Military career
- Allegiance: Nigeria
- Branch: Nigerian Army
- Service years: 1988–2021
- Rank: Brigadier general

Brigadier General Abdulrahman Kuliya (2 February 1968 – 21 May 2021) was a Nigerian military officer. He died in a military plane crash alongside the Chief of Army Staff (COAS) Lieutenant General Ibrahim Attahiru and 9 other military officers on active service.

He rose to the rank of Brigadier General in the Nigerian Army. He has held several appointments during his career including Director, Land Warfare at the Armed Forces Command and Staff College. Kuliya was the Chief of Military Intelligence – Nigerian Army Intelligence Corps until his death on 21 May 2021.
