= Maulana Abdur Rahman =

Indian politician

- Born: Jammu, Jammu and Kashmir.
- Citizenship: India
- Years active: 1957 to 1962
- Political party: Congress (I).

Maulana Abdur Rahman was member of the 2nd Lok Sabha. He represented the Jammu constituency of Jammu and Kashmir and was a member of the Congress (I) political party. He was in office from April 1957 to March 1962.

== Posts held ==
#	From	To	Position
01	1957	1962	Member, 2nd Lok Sabha

== See also ==
- 2nd Lok Sabha
- Lok Sabha
- List of members of the 15th Lok Sabha of India
