= Abdirahman Haji Aden Ibbi =

Somali politician

Abirahman Hajji Aden Ibbi عبدرحمن حجي ادين ابي
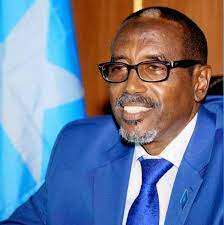
- Ibbi in 2022

Deputy Prime Minister of Somalia
- Prime Minister: Omar Abdirashid Ali Sharmarke
- Prime Minister: Omar Abdirashid Ali Sharmarke

Personal details
- Born: Wajid, Somalia
- Party: Independent

Abdirahman Haji Aden Ibbi (Somali: Abdiraxmaan Haaji Aden Ibbi, Arabic: عبدرحمن حجي ادين ابي) is a Somali politician. He served as the Deputy Prime Minister of Somalia, Minister of Information, and is currently a member of the federal parliament of Somalia.

== History ==
Abdirahman Hajji Aden Ibbi was the former deputy Prime Minister under the administration of the former President, Sheikh Sharif and his Prime Minister Omar Abdirashid Ali Sharmarke. He also served as Minister of Information.
