= Abd al-Rahman Ali al-Hajji =

Iraqi historian (1935–2021)

- عبد الرحمن علي الحجي
- Born: 1935; Baghdad, Iraq
- Died: 18 March 2021 (aged 85–86); Madrid, Spain
- Education: University of Madrid
- Occupations: Historian, academic
- Known for: Contributions to Islamic history and Andalusian studies

Abd al-Rahman Ali al-Hajji (Arabic: عبد الرحمن علي الحجي; 1935 – 18 March 2021) was an Iraqi historian and academic, widely recognized for his work on Islamic history, particularly the history of Al-Andalus (Islamic Spain). His scholarship focused on the rich cultural, political, and scientific contributions of Muslims in Andalusia, and he was celebrated for bridging historical narratives between the Islamic and Western worlds.Abd al-Rahman Ali al-Hajji (1981). Islamic Spain: Its Contribution to Science and Culture. Dar al-Nahda.

== Early life and education ==
Abd al-Rahman Ali al-Hajji was born in 1935 in Baghdad, Iraq. He pursued his higher education in history at the prestigious University of Madrid (now Complutense University of Madrid), where he specialized in Islamic and Andalusian history. His doctoral thesis explored the political and scientific achievements of Muslim rulers in medieval Spain.

== Academic career ==
Al-Hajji served as a professor of Islamic history in various universities across the Middle East, including Baghdad University and University of Kuwait. He authored several influential books and papers on the historical significance of Al-Andalus, emphasizing the era's intellectual and scientific advancements. His writings have been translated into multiple languages and are widely referenced by scholars in both the Arab and Western academic communities.

== Contributions to Andalusian Studies ==
Al-Hajji is best known for his detailed studies on the history of Islamic Spain. His work highlighted the coexistence of Muslims, Christians, and Jews during this period, as well as the significant cultural and scientific contributions of Muslim scholars. Among his notable publications are:

- Islamic Spain: Its Contribution to Science and Culture (1981)
- The Rise and Fall of Al-Andalus (1992)
- The Golden Age of Cordoba (1998)

His work not only contributed to a deeper understanding of Al-Andalus but also fostered a greater appreciation of the shared heritage between the Islamic and Western civilizations.

== Personal life and death ==
In addition to his academic pursuits, al-Hajji was an advocate for intercultural dialogue and understanding. He lived his later years in Spain, where he continued his research and writing. He died on 18 March 2021, in Madrid, Spain, at the age of 86.
