= Abdul Rahman Rafi =

Bahraini poet (1936–2015)

- عبد الرحمن رفيع
- Born: Abdul Rahman Mohammed Rafi; 1936; Manama, Bahrain
- Died: March 11, 2015 (aged 78–79); Manama, Bahrain
- Occupation: poet

Abdul Rahman Mohammed Rafi (Arabic: عبد الرحمن محمد رفيع, born in 1936, died on March 11, 2015) was a Bahraini poet. He was born in the capital of Manama and studied at Cairo University. Working as an observer for cultural affairs at the Ministry of Information, he has authored many poetry collections and is known for working in both Modern Standard Arabic and nabati (vernacular in this case Bahraini Arabic) forms. He died in his hometown.

== Biography ==
Rafi was born in 1936 (or possibly 1938) in Manama, where he grew up. He finished his education through secondary school in Bahrain and attended the Cairo University Faculty of Law, but he interrupted his university studies in his junior year to go home and teach. He worked for many years in the Ministry of State for Legal Affairs before joining the Ministry of Information as its Supervisor of Cultural Affairs.

He died on March 11, 2015, at the age of 79. Ill since December 2014, he had been transferred to the Bahrain Defence Force Hospital.

== Literary career ==
Rafi is considered one of the most prominent poets of the twentieth century in the Persian Gulf region and was known for the commonalities between his formal and vernacular poetry. His most famous works are his satirical poems on consumption (e.g. “الله يجازيك يا زمان” or “God Reward You, O Time” and “ربعة الشعريْ ابثمانْ” or “Four Poetic Excuses”), as well as others like “زمان المصخرهْ” (“The Time of Mockery”), “وأمي العودة” (“My Mother Will Return”), and “والبنات” (“The Girls”). Quotations of his poems circulated as proverbs in the Arab States of the Persian Gulf, making him a popular poet at regional conferences.

== Publications ==
His poetry collections include:

- البحار الأربعة (“The Four Seas,” 1971)
- الدوران حول البعيد (“Around the Distance,” 1979)
- يسألني؟ (“Asking Me?,” 1981)
- ديوان الشعر الشعبي (“Diwan of Folk Poetry,” 1981)
- ديوان بحر وعيون (“Diwan of the Ways of the Sea,” 1987)
- أوّلها كلام (“First Come the Words,” 1991)
- العرب ما خلوشي (“Arabs Are Not Eternal,” 1993)
