= Abderrahmane Ameuroud =

Algerian prisoner

Abderrahmane Ameuroud is an Algerian man convicted of providing funding and forged documents to the assassins of Northern Alliance leader Ahmad Shah Massoud in 2001. He was serving a seven-year sentence in prison, also due to having been in France illegally. He was detained in Brussels on 25 March 2016 in the scope of investigation started after the arrest of Reda Kriket in France for preparation of a terrorist attack.
