= Abdulrahman Abd Ghani =

President of the Somali Region (1994)

Abdulrahman Ghani عبد الرحمن عبد الغني

President of the Somali Region
- In office April 1994 – November 1994
- Preceded by: Hassan Jire Kalinle

Abdulrahman Ghani or Abdulrahman Qani (Somali: Cabdulraxman Maxamed Ghaani, Arabic: عبد الرحمن عبد الغني) is the chieftain of the Talomoge sub-clan of the Ogaden Somali. He is the former President of the Somali Region of Ethiopia (April - November 1994).

== Career ==
When he was named President of the Somali Region, Abdulrahman was director of the Relief and Rehabilitation Commission branch in Gode. He became President of the Somali Region in an inauguration which some critics considered "somewhat irregular". His predecessor, Hassan Jire Kalinle, was removed by the Federal Government in April 1994 on charges of corruption and neglect of official duties, although at least one observer believes the actual reason was due to the Regional Assembly voting to exercise the "right to self-determination" in the 1995 Constitution of Ethiopia.

Although a member of Ogaden clansman, he was supported by the other clans because he was not a member of the ONLF. During his brief tenure, he was seen as a committed enemy of the al-Itihaad al-Islamiya, a now-defunct militant Islamic group based in the Ogaden and parts of Somalia, because he worked closely with the Ethiopian People's Revolutionary Democratic Front during their early operations against the movement. He was deposed by a group within the Regional Executive committee (an action which Abdulrahman described as "unconstitutional" and "a coup"), and petitioned the Federal Government to overturn his removal, which denied his request. After his dismissal the executive committee, led by Abdulrahman's former deputy, Ahmed Makahil, and supported by the committee's Executive Secretary, Iid Tahir Farah, assumed administration of the Region until Iid Tahir Farah became president the following year.

In 1995, fighting between the Abdalla and the Awlihan Somali over land rights in Adadle, became so violent that the UNHCR and NGOs found it difficult to hand out food to internally displaced people living in the woreda. To end the fighting, Abdulrahman made the decision to move the Awlihan subclan to Bohol Hagere, despite protests by his subclan elders.

In 2005, Abdulrahman was one of a dozen elders seeking to arrange peace talks between the Ogaden National Liberation Front and the Ethiopian government. He afterwards left Ethiopia and lived abroad for two years.

Shortly after returning to his home city of Gode in July 2008, Abdulrahman was arrested by the Ethiopian government. Over the following days, a further 70 individuals were also arrested. No charges are believed to have been brought against them and no reason given for their detention. Abdulrahman was released that October, and his relatives a few days later.
