= Abdirahman Eid Daahir =

Ethiopian politician

- Cabdiraxman Ciid Daahir
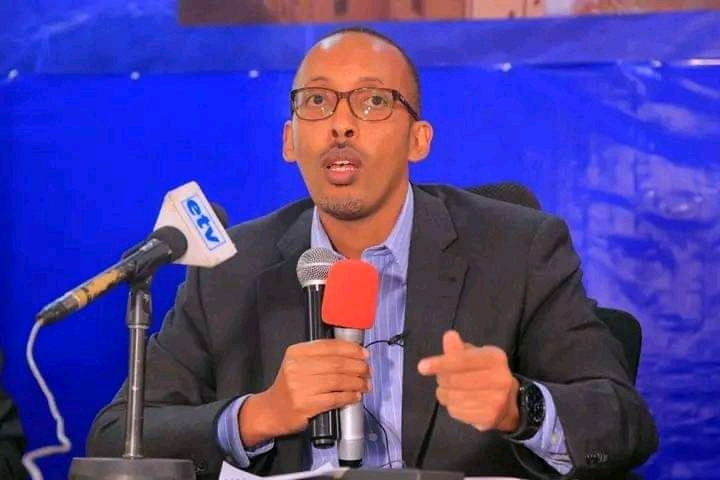

Minister of Drainage and Resource Management of Somali Region
- In office 14 August 2019 – 10 March 2021

Minister of Urban development Somali Region
- Incumbent
- Assumed office 10 March 2021

Personal details
- Born: 1985 (age 40–41) Jigjiga, Hararghe Province, Ethiopian Empire (now Somali Region, Ethiopia)
- Party: Prosperity Party
- Other political affiliations: Ethiopian Somali People's Democratic Party
- Parent: Eid Daahir Farah

Abdirahman Eid Daahir (Somali: Cabdiraxman Ciid Daahir; born 1985), also called Ina Ciid, is an Ethiopian politician who is the current Minister of Urban Development in the Somali Region of Ethiopia. and also the Member of the Somali Democratic Party, a member of Ethiopia's newly formed Prosperity Party led by Abiy Ahmed, the sitting prime minister of Ethiopia. And the son of Eid Daahir Farah, the former president of Somali Region of Ethiopia.

Abdirahman Iid was also appointed to the Minister of Drainage and Resource Management on 14 August 2019.

== Early life ==
Abdirahman Eid Daahir was born in Jigjiga, Ethiopia in 1985. He is the son of the Former president of Somali Region of Ethiopia. He hails from the Sa'ad Musa sub-division of the Habar Awal clan of Isaaq.
