= Abdurahman Abdullahi Baadiyow =

Somali politician

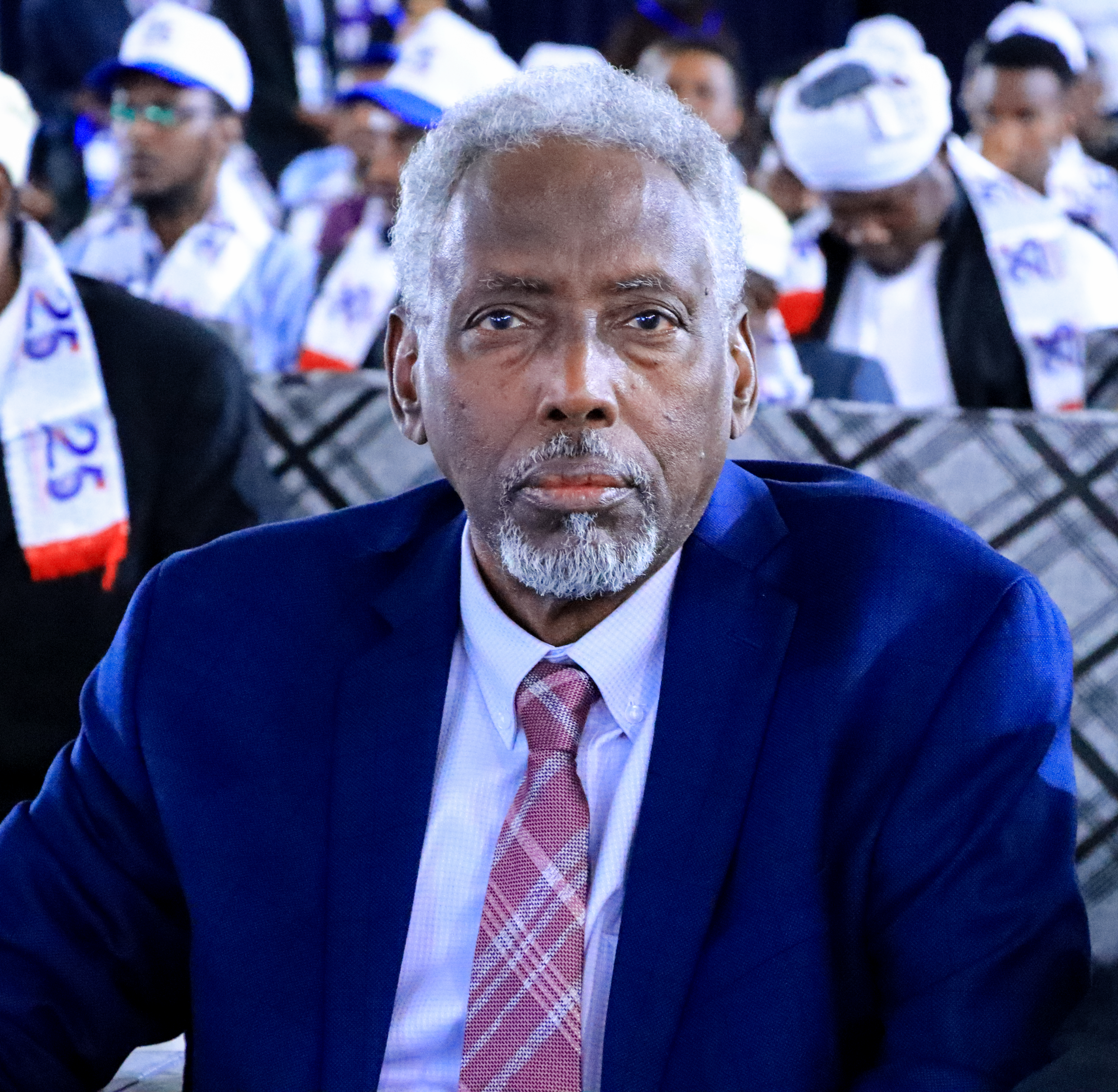

Abdurahman M. Abdullahi (Baadiyow) was born in 1954 in the district of Elder in Somalia. He has been a military officer (1971–1986), electronic engineer, Islamic scholar and civil society activist.

Baadiyow was elected Chairman of the National Unity Party (NUP) established in November 2012 and publicly announced on 26 February 2014. He was also elected as vice chairman of the Forum for Unity and Democracy, the largest coalition of political parties, parliamentarians and former ministers including former prime minister Abdiweli Sheik Ahmed. The Forum was transformed into a political party on 6 February 2016 and renamed The National Forum Party and Dr. Abdurahman was elected as the deputy chairman of the new party and the NUP elected new Chairman. He obtained PhD degree in Islamic history from McGill University in Canada and engineering degree from Somali National University.

Baadiyow is one of the founders of Mogadishu University in 1997 and its chairman of the Board of Trustees. He is prominent a leader of Islah Movement and a member of its Shura Council since 1995, a vice-chairman of Islah in (1999-2008). Currently, he is responsible for the bureau of reconciliation, peace promotion and political activism. He presented himself as one of the potential candidates in Somalia's 2012 presidential elections.

Baadiyow currently is the deputy chairman of the National Forum Party announced in 2015. Dr. Baadiyow was appointed to the position of the Senior Adviser of Peace and Reconciliation for the Somali Prime Minister Hassan Ali Kheyre in 2018. He was appointed by the Somali President to be a member of Federal Republic of Somalia/Somaliland Dialogue Committee in 2019. In 2022, he was appointed to the position of Senior Adviser for Constitutional Affairs for the President Hassan Sheikh Mohamud of Somalia.

== Bibliography ==
=== Dissertations ===
- Ph. D. Dissertation title: The Islamic Movement in Somalia a Historical Evolution With a Case Study of the Islah Movement 1950-2000.
- M.A. dissertation title: Tribalism, Nationalism and Islam: The Crisis of Political Loyalty in Somalia

== Books ==
- The Islamic Movement in Somalia: A study of the Islah movement, 1950-2000 (2015, London Adonis & Abbey publishers) and
- Recovering The Somali State: Islam, Islamism and Transitional Justice (2016, London Adonis & Abbey publishers).
- Making Sense of Somali History (2017, Volume I) and (Volume II, 2018).
- " Somalia: A State in Search of Exceptional Leadership" (2025, Loohpress).

== Links ==
- Profile, scribd.com. Accessed 3 March 2024.
- BIBLIOGRAPHY OF DR. ABDURAHMAN BAADIYOW, academia.edu. Accessed 3 March 2024.
- ABDURAHMAN ABDULLAHI BAADIYOW, mogadishuuniversity.academia.edu. Accessed 3 March 2024.
