= Abdul Rahman Habil =

Libyan politician

Abdurrahman Habil عبد الرحمن هابيل
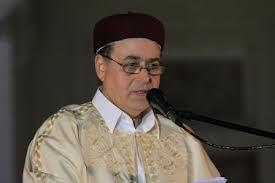

Minister of Culture and Civil Society
- Incumbent
- Assumed office 22 November 2011
- President: Mustafa Abdul Jalil
- Prime Minister: Abdurrahim El-Keib

Personal details
- Party: Independent
- Education: University of Benghazi (B.A.); Indiana University (M.A.); Indiana University (PhD)
- Profession: Lawyer; Politician

Abdurrahman Habil, PhD, (Arabic (عبد الرحمن هابيل;) is a lawyer and Libyan politician. He was named Minister of Culture and Civil Society on 22 November 2011 by Abdurrahim El-Keib.
