= Abdul Rahman Orfalli =

Syrian protest leader

- Born: 1989
- Died: March 20, 2012 (aged 22–23); Homs, Syria
- Known for: An Arab Spring leader in Syria

Abdul Rahman Orfalli was an anti-government organizer during the Syrian revolution, who played a principal role in organizing the original demonstrations in March 2011. On 20 March 2012, he was reported to have been killed in heavy shelling by the Syrian army in an offensive on Homs.

The Homs Coordination Committee said heavy shelling killed Orfalli, 23. He had been arrested twice and tortured during a five-month detainment before returning to Homs to lead anti-government violence, the group said.
