= Abdul Rehman Tukroo =

Abdul Rehman Tukroo is a Kashmiri politician. As of 2014 he served as State Secretary of the Communist Party of India. He is a member of the National Council of the party. He served as Member of the Legislative Council of Jammu and Kashmir. He was elected to the Legislative Council from Kashmir province in 2001. His candidate was supported by the Jammu and Kashmir National Conference.
