= Abderrahmane Amalou =

Moroccan politician (1938–2021)

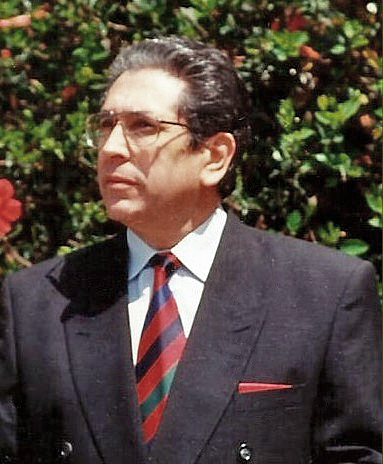

Minister of Justice
- In office 26 February 1995 – 13 August 1997
- Monarch: Hassan II
- Prime Minister: Abdellatif Filali
- Preceded by: Mohammed Drissi Alami Machichi
- Succeeded by: Omar Azziman

Personal details
- Born: 6 April 1938 Marrakesh, Morocco
- Died: 19 November 2021 (aged 83)
- Party: UC

Abderrahmane Amalou (Arabic: عبد الرحمن أمالو; 6 April 1938 – 19 November 2021) was a Moroccan academic, lawyer and politician. He served as Minister of Justice under the second government of Abdellatif Filali from 1995 to 1997.
