= Abdurrahman Buğday =

Turkish criminal

Abdurahman Buğday (born 1959, Palu, Elazığ) is a Turkish criminal who was involved in the Susurluk scandal.

His father is named Süleyman.

In 1976, he was a board member of Malatya Branch of the Idealists' Union (ultra-nationalist youth centers or Grey Wolves).

In 1977, he was among the ultra-nationalist activists who carried out the bombing during the meeting held by the Republican People's Party (CHP) in Malatya.

On September 20, 1979, Buğday killed engineer Hüseyin Tuluk in Malatya. In 1979, he was among the persons who murdered Bektaş Mutlu, member of the Teachers' Association TÖBDER.

In 1981, when he was wanted by Malatya Military Court, information was received that he had been hiding in Istanbul with the assistance of Erol Taş, a renowned Turkish film actor. He used Taş's house as a meeting place.

In July 1989, he fled to Europe. After establishing close relations to members of the PKK, he co-operated with the PKK in drug trafficking.
