= Abdourahamane Soilihi =

Mayotte politician (born 1959)

Abdourahamane Soilihi (born 4 October 1959, in Mayotte) is a French politician who was elected to the French Senate on 25 September 2011, representing the department of Mayotte.
