= Bart Moore-Gilbert =

British academic (1952–2015)

Bartholomew (Bart) Jason Kirsten Moore-Gilbert (8 December 1952 – 2 December 2015) was a Tanzanian-born, British academic, orientalist, political campaigner and writer, most widely known for his work in the field of postcolonial literary studies and theory.

== Education ==
Moore-Gilbert graduated from Durham University (Grey College) in 1975 with a first-class degree in English Language and Literature.

== Career ==
His work has been translated into fifteen languages. Moore-Gilbert taught at Goldsmiths College, University of London, a position he held from 1998. His final academic work, the first critical assessment of postcolonial life-writing in English, was published by Routledge in June 2009.

In 2014, Verso published Moore-Gilbert's memoir The Setting Sun: A Memoir of Empire and Family Secrets, which recounts his travels in India to uncover his father's alleged involvement in acts of British colonial brutality. The book, which combined elements of travel writing, historical research and personal memoir, received positive reviews in The Guardian, Hürriyet Daily News, and The Times Educational Supplement and was shortlisted for the PEN Ackerley Prize.

Moore-Gilbert died in Trinity Hospice on 2 December 2015 after a battle with kidney cancer. During his illness, he kept a blog tracing the development of his cancer and his treatment.

== Selected publications ==
- Cultural Closure? The Challenge of the Arts in the 1970s (1994), ISBN 978-0415099059
- Cultural Revolution? The Challenge of the Arts in the 1960s (1992), ISBN 978-0415078245
- Postcolonial Theory: Contexts, Practices, Politics (1997), ISBN 978-1859840344
- Post Colonial Criticism (Longman Critical Reader) (ed) (1997), ISBN 978-0-582-23798-8
- Writing India (ed), 1757–1990: Literature of British India (1996), ISBN 978-0719042652
- Kipling and Orientalism (1986), ISBN 978-0709935056
- Hanif Kureishi (2001), ISBN 978-0719055355
- Postcolonial Life-Writing: Culture, Politics, and Self-Representation (2009), ISBN 978-0415443005
- The Setting Sun: A Memoir of Empire and Family Secrets (2014), ISBN 978-1781682685
