= Abderrahmane Mostefa =

Algerian film director, photographer and journalist (1947–2024)

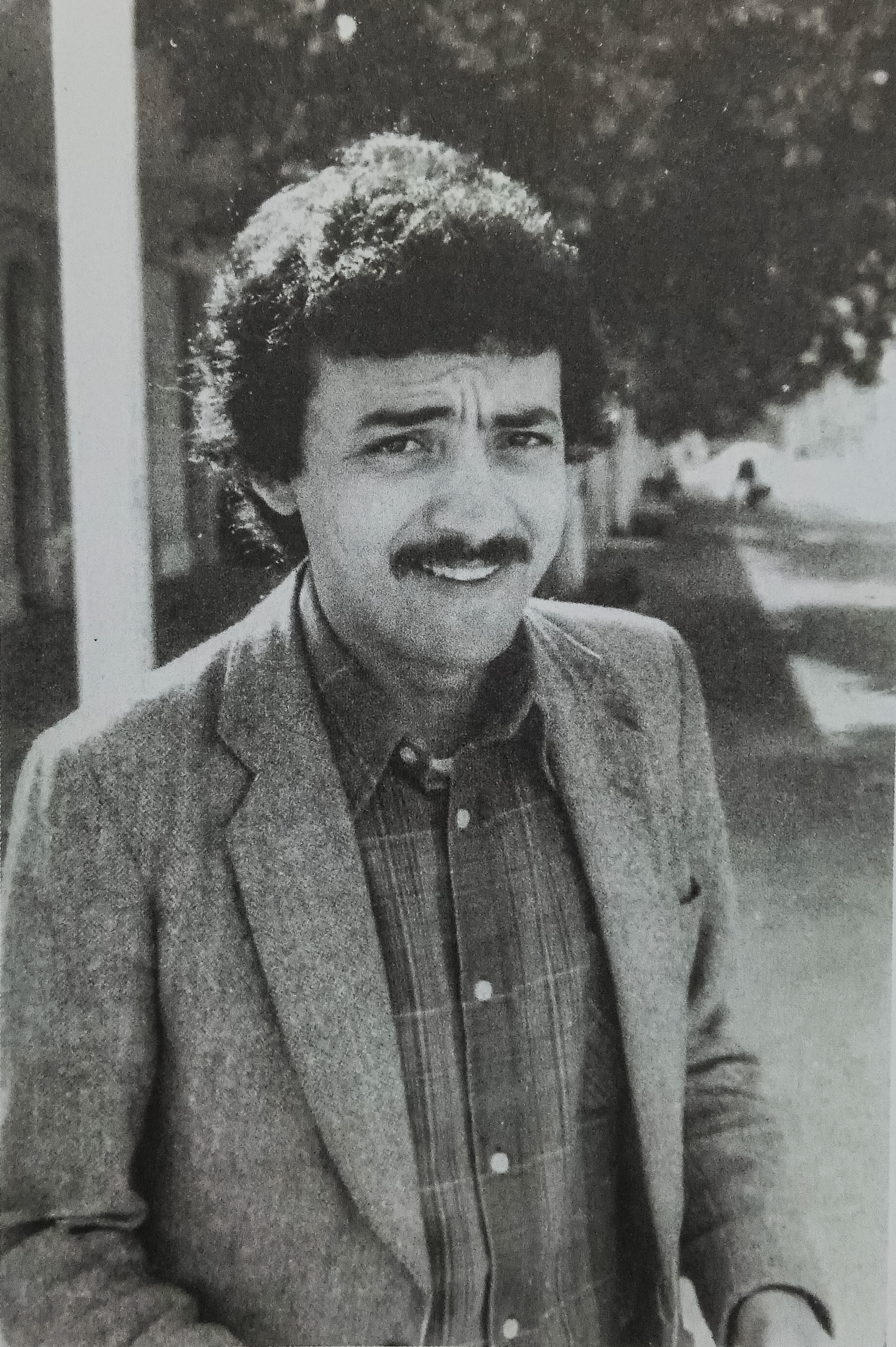
- Mostefa in 1993
- Born: 28 November 1947; Mostaganem
- Citizenship: Algeria, France
- Occupations: Film director, Photographer, Journalist

Abderrahmane Mostefa (28 November 1947 – 1 November 2024) was an Algerian documentary filmmaker, photographer and journalist.

== Life and career ==
Mostefa born on 28 November 1947 in Mostaganem. He studied directing at the Institute of Agricultural Technology in Mostaganem, at ORTF and the École nationale supérieure Louis-Lumière in Paris, and made several documentaries and reports.

== Death ==
Mostefa died from a cardiac arrest on the night of 31 October to 1 November 2024, at the age of 76.

== Selected filmography ==
- Les Cuves de la mort (1996)
- Notre terre vaut de l'or (2008)
- Demain reste toujours à faire (2009)
- Cassaigne, le camp de la mort (2011)
- Denis Martinez, l'artiste pédagogue (2012)
- Les Enfumades du Dahra

== Awards and recognitions ==
- 1993: UNESCO Photography Prize
- 1997: Grand Prize for Photography of the City of Algiers
- 1998: Wissam Ali-Maâchi
