= Abdulrahman Shuaibu Abubakar =

Nigerian politician

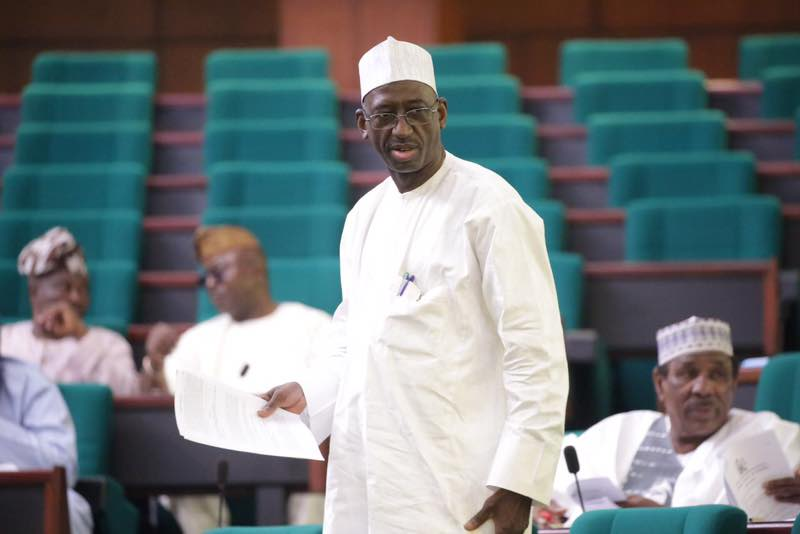
- Abdulrahman Shuaibu Abubakar moving a motion during plenary at the House of Representatives

Member representing Mubi North/Mubi South/Mahia Federal Constituency in the House of Representatives of Nigeria
- In office 9 June 2015 – 2019
- Preceded by: Abubakar Mahmud Wambai
- Succeeded by: Jaafar Abubakar Magaji

Commissioner Ministry of Land & Survey; Member Adamawa State Executive Council
- In office 2007–2014

Personal details
- Born: July 5, 1965 (age 61) Mubi, Adamawa state
- Party: All Progressives Congress
- Education: Ahmadu Bello University, Zaria
- Occupation: Chartered Accountant, Legislator

Abdulrahman Shuaibu Abubakar (born 5 July 1965), the Talban Mubi and Ebubedike Ndigbo of Mubi, is a Nigerian accountant, businessman, philanthropist and lawmaker. He represents Mubi North/Mubi South/Mahia federal constituency of Adamawa state in the Nigerian House of Representatives, and is a member of the country's governing party, the All Progressives Congress (APC).

== Early life and education ==
Abdulrahman was born in Digil, Mubi North Local Government Area of Adamawa State on 5 July 1965, to the family of Alhaji Shuaibu Liman Difil. He is the second of 15 children.

His education began at Demonstration Primary School, Mubi, where he was a pupil from 1972 to 1973. In 1974, he moved on to Digil Primary School, also in Mubi, and obtained a primary school leaving certificate in 1978. His secondary education took place at the Federal Government College, Maiduguri, from 1978 to 1983. From 1983 to 1984, he attended the School of Basic Studies in the Ahmadu Bello University, Zaria, then proceeded to study accounting at the Institute of Administration (also in ABU, Zaria), and graduated in 1987. He also obtained a certificate in computer and computer operation.

He has two master's degrees from the Enugu State University of Science and Technology, the first in Business Administration (Banking and Finance; awarded in 1998) and the second in Economics (awarded in 2002). He also attended several additional courses at the Enugu State University of Science and Technology, the Lagos Business School and the Manchester Business School.

He is a fellow of professional bodies such as the Association of National Accountants of Nigeria, Nigerian Institute of Management, Nigerian Institute of International Affairs, National Institute of Marketing of Nigeria, Institute of Chartered Management Accountants, Institute Of Entrepreneurs, Nigeria, a member of the Nigerian Economic Summit Group and former Council Member of the Manufacturers’ Association of Nigeria (2005-2007).

== Professional career ==
From September 1987 – August 1988, as a National Youth Service Corps member, Abdulrahman Shuaibu Abubakar served as a cashier at the Bauchi State Agric Supply Co. Ltd. In September 1988, he began working at Bulkship Nigeria Ltd, where he was an Assistant Accountant until February 1990, when he became an accountant at Medapharm International Nigeria Ltd., a position he would later leave in March 1991. Between March 1991 and June 2007, he served in various capacities at Frenchies Ltd., such as financial controller, finance director, deputy managing director and managing director.

He has also chaired or served on the board of various companies, including Adamawa Investment & Property Development Company Ltd (August 1999 – June 2007), Haisa Tech and Allied Services Ltd. (January 1994 – June 2007), Saah Holdings Ltd. (June 1994 – June 2007), Bagale Motels Ltd, Phoenix oil Ltd (January 2001 – June 2007), and Tiddo Universal Securities Ltd, with interests in various sectors including shipping, food processing, hospitality and finance.

He was chairman of the governing council of the Federal Government Science Unity School, Sokoto, from April – June 2007.

== Political career ==
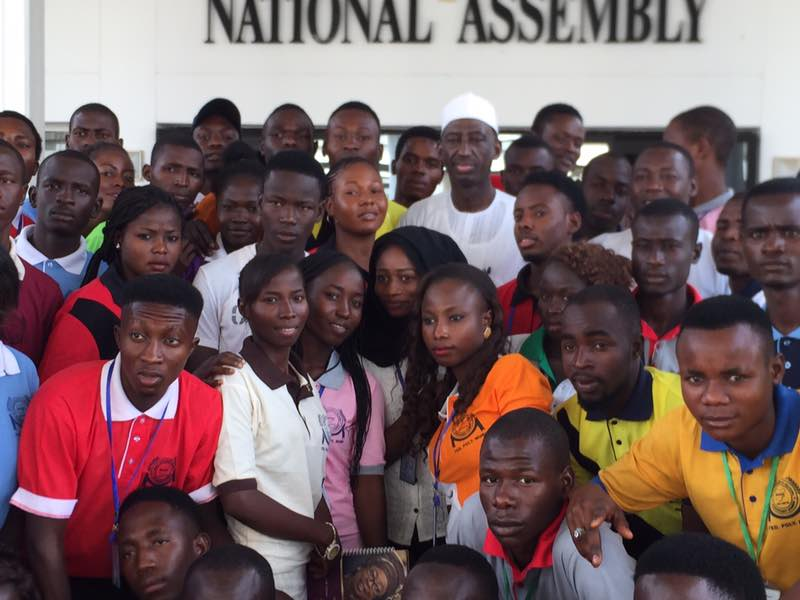
Hon. Abdulrahman Shuaibu Abubakar with accounting students of the Federal Polytechnic, Mubi, while on excursion to the National Assembly, Abuja

Although he had initially limited his political involvement to supporting candidates and did not wish to venture into mainstream politics, he was appointed as Commissioner in 2007 by the then governor of Adamawa State, Murtala Nyako, in recognition of achievements that he had recorded in the private sector. He therefore served as Commissioner for Lands and Survey – and was on the Adamawa State Executive Council – from 2007 to 2014, when Governor Nyako was impeached.

Some achievements recorded during his tenure as Commissioner include the establishment of the Adamawa Geographic Information System (ADGIS), establishment of second order controls in all twenty one local government areas, development of Adamawa Sustainable Development Plan, commencement of work on the Adamawa Master Plan, township mapping of greater Yola, greater Mubi, Mayo Balwa and Numan, creation of layouts and distribution of over fifty thousand plots including sites for estates, survey and demarcation of various government sites including guyuk cement site, laying of fiber optic cables to link offices with ADGIS through local area network, and the revenue profile of the ministry he headed increased by over one thousand percent.

In 2014, following Nyako's impeachment, he began to campaign for a seat at the House of Representatives. Subsequently, he earned his party's nomination for Mubi North/Mubi South/Mahia federal constituency, and won at the March 2015 polls.

== Bills and Motions ==
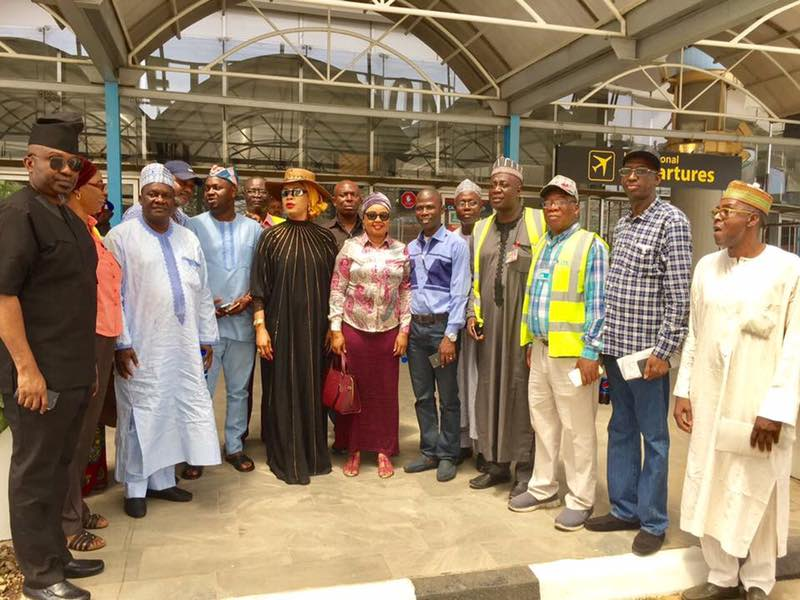
Hon. Abdulrahman Shuaibu Abubakar and other legislators on oversight duty

Abdulrahman Shuaibu, as a federal legislator, has sponsored many bills and motions since the inauguration of the Eighth House of Representatives in June 2015, some of which are listed below;

1. In December 2015, he moved a motion on the resurgence of meningitis and the need to provide vaccination and increase awareness.
2. In February 2016, he sponsored A Bill for an Act to Alter Section 147 of the Constitution of the Federal Republic of Nigeria to, among others, require the President to indicate the portfolio that a Ministerial Nominee shall occupy, and the Unclaimed Financial Assets Bill, 2016.
3. In March, 2016, he sponsored a Bill for An Act to Establish the National Poverty Alleviation and Eradication Commission of Nigeria, and for other related matters.
4. In August 2016, he sponsored the Fisheries Society of Nigeria Bill, 2016.
5. In December 2016, he moved a motion on the need to revive the textile industry in Nigeria.
6. In November 2016, he moved a motion on the need for government to take immediate action to encourage irrigation farming in the country.
7. He also moved a motion on the need for government to take immediate action on the reported malnutrition and death in the IDP camp in Bama and other areas recovered from insurgents.
8. In March 2017, he raised a motion on the urgent need to complete the rehabilitation of Mubi-Maiha-Sorau road in Adamawa state.
9. In April, 2017, he moved a motion on the need to investigate the activities of security personnel at the checkpoint along Yola-Girei road

in Adamawa State.

He has also empowered his constituents via entrepreneurial training, provided capital to others to start small businesses, and implemented social welfare programmes targeted at orphans and widows.

== Awards and honours ==
Abdulrahman Shuaibu has received awards from various organisations. Some of these include the Corporate Achievers Award (BAFISA 1998), The Best Investors Award (BAFISA 1999), African Best Man Patriotic Leadership Gold Award (by Vision Africa Magazine 2003), Patriotic Achievers’ Award (Franolly Incorporated 2004), Best Performing Commissioner Of The Year 2010 (Shettima Ali Monguno Education Foundation Merit Award 2011), Achievers Gold Award (National Institute Of Marketing, 2011).

== See also ==
- Yakubu Dogara
- Murtala Nyako
- Bindo Jibrilla
