= Abd al-Rahman al-Jamal =

Palestinian politician

Abdel Rahman Al Jamal is a Palestinian politician and member of the 2nd Palestinian Legislative Council.

== Biography ==
Jamal was born in Nuseirat refugee camp, Gaza. In 1987, he completed his bachelor's degree in Palestine. He completed his master's degree and PhD at the University of Jordan.

Jamal was the dean of the Islamic studies at the Islamic University of Gaza.
