= Abdul Rehman Shakir Patni =

Indian politician

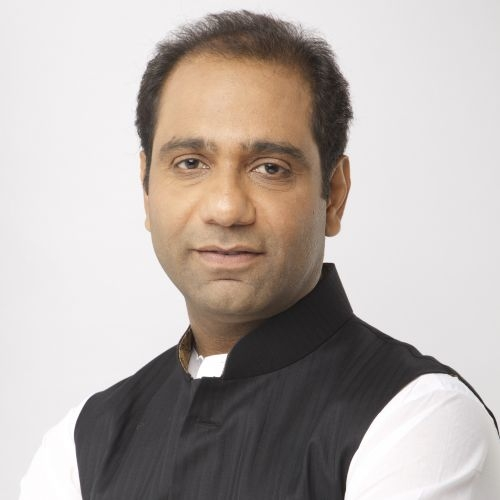

Abdul Rehman Shakir Patni is an Indian politician based in Mumbai, Maharashtra, and currently serves as Maharashtra General Secretary and he was serving Mumbai President of the All India Majlis-e-Ittehadul Muslimeen (AIMIM).

Brihanmumbai Municipal Corporation (BMC) 2017 Election was fought under the leadership of him and on developmental agenda, tickets where issued to those candidates only who were keen to work for development instead of focusing on citizens’ religion and caste background. He believes that people have wrong perception about AIMIM and have said that the party is communal which is unjustified. He stated, "Our party wants to work for the development of the city and we don’t want to divide voters on communal lines."

He announced a personal donation of Rs 5 lakh for the Muslim Women Protest Against Triple Talaq Bill In Mumbai at Azad Maidan organised by the women's wing of the All India Muslim Personal Law Board on 31 March 2018.
