= Abdul-Rahman Nafad =

Egyptian footballer (born 2004)

Personal information
- Full name: Abdul-Rahman Nafad
- Date of birth: 1 April 2004 (age 22)
- Position: Goalkeeper

Team information
- Current team: Zamalek

Senior career*
Years	Team	Apps	(Gls)
2020–2024	Zamalek		
- * Club domestic league appearances and goals

Abdul-Rahman Nafad (Arabic: عبد الرحمن نفاد; born 1 April 2004) is an Egyptian professional footballer who plays as a goalkeeper for Egyptian Premier League club Zamalek.
