= Abd al-Rahman Khalaf al-Anizi =

Kuwaiti national

Abd aL-Rahman Khalaf al-Anizi (born approximately 1973) is a Kuwaiti national who fundraises for the al-Nusra Front for the People of the Levant, ISIS, and al-Qaida. According to the US Department of the Treasury he has worked with senior al-Qaida officials since 2008 to facilitate the flow of funds from Kuwait to Syria and helped pay for the travel of foreign fighters from Syria to Iraq. He has also recruited for al-Qaida in Afghanistan in Kuwait and Iran. Since 2013 he has been more directly involved in gathering funds, operatives, and logistics for terrorist groups in Syria.

In 2014 Foreign Policy listed Anizi in their annual 100 Global Thinkers as an "Agitator", a category dedicated to those who have caused significant international splintering and violence. His name was also added to the sanctions list of the UN's Al-Qaida Sanctions Committee, and he was designated as a key supporter of terrorists in Syria and Iraq by the US Department of the Treasury.
