= Abdulrahman Mohammed Jamsheer =

Bahraini businessman (1943 or 1944 – 2024)

Abdulrahman Mohammed Saif Jamsheer (Arabic: عبد الرحمن محمد سيف جمشير; 1943 or 1944 – 28 August 2024) was a Bahraini businessman and politician.

== Biography ==
Jamsheer was appointed by his Majesty the King of the Kingdom of Bahrain as a member and then elected as the First Deputy Chairman of the Shura Council for the period of 2002–2006 and served as the Chairman of the Foreign Affairs, Defense and National Security of the Shura Council in the Kingdom of Bahrain.

During the start of his career he worked in Bahrain's Ministry of Agriculture and later the United Nations' Food and Agriculture Organization. In 1973, he amongst others founded the National Import and Export Company, currently Esterad Investment Company, and was appointed the General Manager until 1980, and from 1980 Managing Director, member of the Board of Directors and Investment Committee. He was also President of Bahrain's most notable cultural and social organization, the Alumni Club, from 1994 until death. He was one of the most active members of Bahrain's Shura Council, being a member (at that time only an advisory council) from 1996 until 2001. As a selected member of the National Action Charter preparation committee, he was elected as the General Secretary. After the induction of the Kingdom of Bahrain's National Charter in 2001, he was appointed once again to the Upper House of the National Assembly, which has been since then an arm of the legislative branch. In 2002, he founded the National Action Charter Society and remained as President until 2005. Jamsheer was previously the First Vice Chairman of the Shura Council and served as the Chairman of the Foreign Affairs, Defence and National Security of the Shura Council in the Kingdom of Bahrain. Jamsheer was also a member of the Arab League Parliament.

Jamsheer was a graduate of the American University of Beirut in Lebanon with a Bachelor of Science (B.Sc.) and Engineer Agricole Diploma. He worked in Bahrain's public sector from 1967 upon his graduation and until he joined the UNFAO in 1971. Jamsheer was the founder of National Import and Export Company, a commodities import and export company, until its portfolio was changed in 2000 to a full-fledged investment company traded on the Bahrain Stock Exchange (BSE). Thus, the company is today known as Esterad Investment Company. Jamsheer was from 1984 to 1989 a board member of the elected, Bahrain Chamber of Commerce and Industry (BCCI).

Jamsheer was recently the Chairman of Delmon Poultry Company & Bahrain District Cooling Company (TABREED) and Vice Chairman of Khaleeji Commercial Bank, Esterad Investment Company & Lona Real Estate Development Company and Board Member of BANZ, United Cement Company, Saar Investment Company and Daih Real Estate Development Company. Jamsheer was formerly board member of Ahli Commercial Bank, KIPCO (Kuwait Investments Project Company) and Chairman of both Balexco Aluminum Company and Etisalcom Telecommunication Holding Company.

As an active member of Bahrain's private sector, he was also active in philanthropic committees and associations, as well as his role in Bahrain's legislative branch.

Jamsheer died on 28 August 2024, at the age of 80.
