= Abdul Rahman Muhammad Nasir Qasim al-Yaf'i =

Yemeni man subjected to extraordinary rendition

Abdul Rahman Muhammad Nasir Qasim al-Yaf'i is a Yemeni man, who was taken from Egypt by American forces in October 2000, and sent to Jordan. He was one of 14 people subjected to extraordinary rendition by the CIA prior to the 2001 declaration of a war on terror. He was returned to Yemen after five months of interrogation.
