= Abdulrahman Mohammed (footballer, born 1988) =

Qatari footballer

Personal information
- Full name: Abdulrahman Mohammed Ali Hussain
- Date of birth: 16 March 1988 (age 38)
- Place of birth: Qatar
- Height: 1.76 m (5 ft 9 1/2 in)
- Position: Midfielder

Senior career*
Years	Team	Apps	(Gls)
2007–2014	Al-Ahli		
2014–2017	Lekhwiya	23	(0)
2015–2016	→ Al-Wakra (loan)	22	(2)
2016–2017	→ Al Ahli (loan)	12	(0)
2017–2018	Qatar	11	(0)
2018–2019	Al-Ahli	2	(0)
2019–2020	Al-Sailiya	13	(1)
2020–2021	Al-Kharaitiyat	16	(0)

International career
2015–	Qatar	10	(0)
- * Club domestic league appearances and goals

Abdulrahman Mohammed Ali Hussain (Arabic:عبد الرحمن محمد) (born 16 March 1988) is a Qatari footballer.
