= Omar Abdul Rahman (academic) =

Malaysian academic (born 1932)

Yang Berbahagia Tan Sri Dr. Omar Abdul Rahman PSM JMN JSM
- Born: Omar bin Abdul Rahman; 1932 (age 93–94)
- Occupations: Academician and corporate figure

Omar bin Abdul Rahman P.S.M., J.M.N., J.S.M. (born 1932) is a Malaysian academic and corporate figure. He is currently the president and CEO of the MUST Ehsan Foundation, a nonprofit foundation that manages and administers the Malaysia University of Science and Technology (MUST).

== Career ==
=== Early academic career ===
Omar graduated from the University of Sydney in 1958 with a degree in Veterinary Science and later earned a Ph.D from University of Cambridge in 1966. He started his professional career in 1960 in veterinary research, then in 1972 moved on to academic life at Universiti Pertanian Malaysia (UPM), now Universiti Putra Malaysia where he was the Founding Dean of the Faculty of Veterinary Medicine and Animal Sciences and the first professor appointed by the university. Omar played major roles in the establishment phase of the university and in the founding of several faculties and academic programmes. His last position at UPM was as Deputy Vice-Chancellor Academic Affairs.

=== Government and corporate career ===
In 1984 he was appointed Science Adviser in the Prime Minister's Department, the first person to hold the position. As Science Adviser, Tan Sri Omar served on a number of national committees including The National Development Planning Committee, The National Council for Scientific Research and Development, The National Information Technology Council and the National Telecommunication Council. He initiated a number of national programmes for enhancing research and development funding, for commercialization of the results of research and for the overall improvement of the national science and technology management processes.

He was the founder chairman of Technology Park Malaysia Corporation, the Malaysian Industry-Government Group for High Technology (MIGHT), Composite Technology (Research) Malaysia Sdn Bhd and Malaysian Technology Development Corporation.

=== Later academic career ===
Omar is also the founding and current chairman of the London-based Commonwealth Partnership for Technology Management Ltd (CPTM), Founding Fellow of the Islamic World Academy of Sciences, a Fellow of the Academy of Sciences for The Developing World), an Honorary Fellow of the National Academy of Sciences of the Kyrgyz Republic and the Founding and Immediate Past President of the Academy of Sciences Malaysia.

He also served as a member of the United Nations Advisory Committee on Science and Technology for Development, the Executive Committee for the Organisation of the Islamic Conference's Ministerial Standing Committee on Scientific and Technological Cooperation and of the UNESCO’s International Scientific Council for Science and Technology Policy Development.

=== Retirement from government service ===
He retired as Science Advisor in January 2001 after serving for more than 16 years but remains as Prime Minister's Special Representative to CPTM. Upon retirement in January 2001, he was given the task to establish and manage the Venture Capital for Technology Acquisition fund, a government fund managed by Kumpulan Modal Perdana Sdn. Bhd., of which he was its Executive Chairman from 2001 to April 2007.

== Awards and honours ==
In recognition of his contributions, Omar has received the following:

=== Honorary doctorates ===
==== Australia ====
- University of Melbourne, Melbourne, Victoria
- University of Queensland, Brisbane, Queensland

==== Canada ====
- University of Guelph, Guelph, Ontario

==== Malaysia ====
- National University of Malaysia, Bangi, Selangor
- Universiti Putra Malaysia, Serdang, Selangor
- Universiti Teknologi Malaysia, Skudai, Johor

==== United Kingdom ====
- University of Bristol, Bristol, England
- University of Stirling, Stirling, Scotland

=== State honours ===
==== Malaysian federal awards ====
- Malaysia: Companion of the Order of Loyalty to the Crown of Malaysia (J.S.M.) (1976)
- Malaysia: Companion of the Order of the Defender of the Realm (J.M.N.) (1987)
- Malaysia: Commander of the Order of Loyalty to the Crown of Malaysia (P.S.M.) (1994)
