= Mohammed Omar Abdel-Rahman =

Egyptian extrajudicial prisoner of the US

Mohammed Omar Abdel-Rahman (محمد عمر عبدالرحمن) is an Egyptian who was in United States custody in one of the CIA's "black sites". Also known as "Asadullah" (i.e. The lion of God.) Human Rights Watch reports he is the son of Sheikh Omar Abdel-Rahman, the "blind sheikh" who was convicted of involvement in the first al Qaeda bombing of the World Trade Center, in 1993. Mohammed is alleged to have run a training camp, and to have had a role in operational planning.

An e-mail from Mohammed led to the capture of Khalid Sheikh Mohammed.

Human Rights Watch reported that Mohammed was captured in February 2003, in Quetta, Pakistan.

Mohammed was later extradited to Egypt and was released in 2010.

On December 9, 2014, the United States Senate Intelligence Committee published the 600-page unclassified summary of a 6,000-page report on the CIA's use of torture. While some of the CIA's captives were identified as having been subjected only to torture that had been authorized from Washington, other captives, like Asadallah, were identified as having been tortured by CIA officials who did not have authorization. According to the National Journal, the Intelligence Committee described how "Interrogators used water dousing, forced nudity, and cramped confinement on Asadallah without having sought or received authorization from CIA Headquarters."
