= Muhammad Abdur Rahman =

Justice of the Sindh High Court

Mohammad Abdur Rahman
- محمد عبدُالرحمان

Justice of the Sindh High Court
- Incumbent
- Assumed office 14 April 2023

Personal details
- Born: 24 May 1976 (age 50)
- Education: Karachi Grammar School
- Alma mater: University of Sussex

Muhammad Abdur Rahman (Urdu: محمد عبدُالرحمان; born 24 May 1976), is a Pakistani jurist who has served as a Justice of the Sindh High Court since 14 April 2023.

== Biography ==
Abdur Rahman was educated at the Karachi Grammar School and at the University of Sussex at Brighton graduating in 1999 and was called to the Bar from the Inner Temple in 2000.

He was appointed as an additional judge of the Sindh High Court on 14 April 2023, and he assumed the position of a permanent judge after taking the oath of office on 14 April 2024.
