= 2022 Qatar FA Cup =

Tournament details
- Country: Qatar
- Dates: 3 April 2022 – 8 May 2022
- Teams: 16

Final positions
- Champions: Al-Arabi SC (1st title)
- Runners-up: Lusail SC

Tournament statistics
- Matches played: 77
- Goals scored: 182 (2.36 per match)

The 2022 Qatar FA Cup was the second edition of the Qatari cup tournament in men's football. It was played by the bottom 8 teams from the Qatar Stars League and the entire Qatari Second Division.

The tournament featured 16 teams divided into 3 groups.

== Round One Groups ==
Group A	Group B	Group C
Al-Sailiya SC; Al-Shamal SC; Al Bidda SC; Al Shahaniya SC; Al-Waab SC; Al-Wakrah SC	Lusail SC; Al-Arabi SC; Mesaimeer SC; Qatar SC; Al-Khor SC	Muaither SC; Al-Kharaitiyat SC; Umm Salal SC; Al-Markhiya SC; Al Ahli SC

=== Standings ===
==== Group A ====
Pos	Team	Pld	W	D	L	GF	GA	GD	Pts
1	Al-Sailiya SC	5	4	1	0	16	7	+9	13
2	Al-Shamal SC	5	4	0	1	20	7	+13	12
3	Al Bidda SC	5	3	1	1	10	7	+3	10
4	Al Shahaniya SC	5	1	1	3	8	12	−4	4
5	Al-Waab SC	5	1	1	3	8	15	−7	4
6	Al-Wakrah SC	5	0	0	5	5	19	−14	0

Rules for classification: 1) points; 2) goal difference; 3) number of goals scored.

===== Results =====
Date	Team 1	Score	Team 2
2022/04/03	Al-Wakrah SC	2–3	Al-Waab SC
2022/04/03	Al-Sailiya SC	4–2	Al Shahaniya SC
2022/04/03	Al-Shamal SC	3–0	Al Bidda SC
2022/04/08	Al Bidda SC	4–1	Al-Wakrah SC
2022/04/08	Al-Waab SC	0–3	Al-Sailiya SC
2022/04/08	Al Shahaniya SC	2–1	Al-Shamal SC
2022/04/13	Al Bidda SC	2–1	Al-Waab SC
2022/04/13	Al-Wakrah SC	0–1	Al Shahaniya SC
2022/04/13	Al-Shamal SC	2–3	Al-Sailiya SC
2022/04/18	Al-Waab SC	1–5	Al-Shamal SC
2022/04/18	Al-Sailiya SC	4–1	Al-Wakrah SC
2022/04/18	Al Shahaniya SC	0–2	Al Bidda SC
2022/04/23	Al Bidda SC	2–2	Al-Sailiya SC
2022/04/23	Al-Wakrah SC	1–7	Al-Shamal SC
2022/04/23	Al Shahaniya SC	3–3	Al-Waab SC

==== Group B ====
Pos	Team	Pld	W	D	L	GF	GA	GD	Pts
1	Lusail SC	4	3	1	0	5	1	+4	10
2	Al-Gharafa SC	4	3	0	1	14	7	+7	9
3	Qatar SC	4	2	1	1	8	9	−1	7
4	Al Shahaniya SC	4	1	0	3	5	11	−6	3
5	Al-Khor SC	4	0	0	4	6	10	−4	0

Rules for classification: 1) points; 2) goal difference; 3) number of goals scored.

===== Results =====
Date	Team 1	Score	Team 2
2022/04/04	Al-Khor SC	0–1	Lusail SC
2022/04/04	Qatar SC	1–4	Mesaimeer SC
2022/04/09	Lusail SC	1–0	Qatar SC
2022/04/09	Mesaimeer SC	1–6	Al-Arabi SC
2022/04/14	Al-Arabi SC	1–3	Lusail SC
2022/04/14	Qatar SC	2–3	Al-Arabi SC
2022/04/19	Al-Khor SC	3–2	Al-Khor SC
2022/04/19	Lusail SC	0–0	Mesaimeer SC
2022/04/24	Al-Arabi SC	4–1	Qatar SC
2022/04/24	Mesaimeer SC	3–2	Al-Khor SC

==== Group C ====
Pos	Team	Pld	W	D	L	GF	GA	GD	Pts
1	Muaither SC	4	3	1	0	12	5	+7	10
2	Al Kharaitiyat SC	4	3	0	1	10	7	+3	9
3	Umm Salal SC	4	1	1	2	5	9	−4	4
4	Al-Markhiya SC	4	1	0	3	7	9	−2	3
5	Al Ahli SC	4	1	0	3	5	9	−4	3

Rules for classification: 1) points; 2) goal difference; 3) number of goals scored.

===== Results =====
Date	Team 1	Score	Team 2
2022/04/05	Al Ahli SC	0–2	Muaither SC
2022/04/05	Al-Markhiya SC	1–2	Al Kharaitiyat SC
2022/04/10	Al Kharaitiyat SC	3–1	Al Ahli SC
2022/04/10	Muaither SC	3–3	Umm Salal SC
2022/04/15	Al Ahli SC	3–4	Al-Markhiya SC
2022/04/15	Umm Salal SC	0–4	Al Kharaitiyat SC
2022/04/20	Al Kharaitiyat SC	1–5	Muaither SC
2022/04/20	Al-Markhiya SC	1–2	Umm Salal SC
2022/04/25	Muaither SC	2–1	Al-Markhiya SC
2022/04/25	Umm Salal SC	0–1	Al Ahli SC

== Knockout round ==
=== Quarter-finals ===
28 April 2022

Lusail SC	1–0	Al Bidda SC
Yousef Othman 84'

28 April 2022

Al-Sailiya SC	2–2	Mesaimeer SC
Mohamed Salah Elneel 34'; Dostonbek Khamdamov 90+4'		Monkez Adi 37'; Mohammad Al Marmour 45'
Penalties
Walter Bwalya (penalty scored); Dostonbek Khamdamov (penalty scored); Mohammaed Muddather (penalty scored)	3-4	Robson (penalty scored); Abderahman Samir (penalty scored); Rostand Junior M'baï (penalty scored); Ali Faidh Atashi (penalty scored)

Jassim bin Hamad Stadium, Doha

29 April 2022

Al-Arabi SC	2–1	Umm Salal
Farshid Esmaeili 5'; Abdullah Nasser Al Maresi 66'		Abdel Fadel Suanon 15'

Grand Hamad Stadium, Doha

29 April 2022

Muaither SC	3–5	Al-Shamal SC
Nabil El Zhar 51'; Rafael Ramazotti 82'; Abdallah Al Anzi 83'		Nasser Al-Nasr 46'; Abdurahman Waleed 39'; Ali-Olwan 61'; Amjad Attwan 77'; Mohamed Tarkhan 90'

Jassim bin Hamad Stadium, Doha

=== Semi-finals ===
4 May 2022

Mesaimeer SC	0–2	Lusail SC
		Saoud Ali Abdallah 51', 68'; Mohammed Al-Kenani 90+1'

2 May 2022

Al-Shamal SC	1–1	Al-Arabi SC
Talal Muneer 42'		Abdulaziz Al-Ansari 57'
Penalties
Nasser Al-Nasr (penalty scored); Fahad Waad Al Bayati (penalty scored)	2-4	Hamid Ismail (penalty scored); Aaron Boupendza (penalty scored); Abdullah Nasser Al Maresi (penalty scored); Ibrahim Kala (penalty scored)

Al-Shamal SC Stadium, Madinat ash Shamal

== Final ==
8 May 2022

Lusail SC	2–3	Al-Arabi SC
Mohammed Al-Kenani 41'; Abdurahman Mesaad 49'		Aaron Boupendza 3'; Abdulaziz Al-Ansari 13'; Abdullah Nasser Al Maresi 79'

Jassim bin Hamad Stadium, Doha
