= Yasin Yaqoob =

Qatari association football player (born 1996)

Yasin Yaqoob ياسين يعقوب
Personal information
- Full name: Yasin Yaqoub Dorzadeh
- Date of birth: 29 June 1996 (age 30)
- Place of birth: Qatar
- Height: 1.75 m (5 ft 9 in)
- Position: Defender

Team information
- Current team: Lusail
- Number: 44

Youth career
- –2016: Al-Gharafa

Senior career*
Years	Team	Apps	(Gls)
2016–2017	Al-Markhiya	-	(-)
2017–2020	Al-Arabi	29	(0)
2020–2022	Al-Shamal	11	(0)
2022–2023	Mesaimeer	-	(-)
2023	Al-Markhiya	10	(0)
2024–	Lusail	0	(0)
- * Club domestic league appearances and goals

Yasin Dorzadeh (Arabic:ياسين درزاده) (born 29 June 1996) is a Qatari footballer who plays for Lusailas a defender.

== Career ==
=== Al-Gharafa ===
Yasin Yaqoub started his career at Al-Gharafa and is a product of the Al-Gharafa's youth system.

=== Al-Markhiya ===
On 2016 left Al-Gharafa and signed with Al-Markhiya.

=== Al-Arabi ===
On 31 October 2017, he left Al-Markhiya and signed with Al-Arabi. On 19 November 2017, Yasin Yaqoub made his professional debut for Al-Arabi against Al-Rayyan in the Pro League, replacing Tariq Hamed.

=== Al-Shamal ===
On 8 September 2020, he left Al-Arabi and signed with Al-Shamal.
