= List of football clubs in Qatar =

This is a list of football clubs located in Qatar, sorted alphabetically.

- Al-Ahly Doha
- Al-Arabi SC (Qatar)
- Al Bidda SC
- Al-Gharafa Sports Club
- Al Kharaitiyat SC
- Al-Khor Sports Club
- Lusail SC
- Al-Duhail SC
- Al-Markhiya Sports Club
- Al-Mesaimeer Sports Club
- Al-Mu'aidar Sports Club
- Qatar SC
- Al Rayyan Sports Club
- Sadd Sports Club
- Al-Sailiya Sport Club
- Al-Shahaniya Sports Club
- Al-Shamal Sports Club
- Umm Salal Sport Club
- Al-Wakrah Sports Club
