= Jassem Al-Jaber =

Qatari footballer (born 1989)

Jassem Al-Jaber جاسم الجابر
Personal information
- Full name: Jassem Mohammed Al-Jaber
- Date of birth: 15 April 1989 (age 37)
- Place of birth: Qatar
- Position: Left back

Youth career
- Al-Arabi

Senior career*
Years	Team	Apps	(Gls)
2010–2015	Mesaimeer		
2015–2017	Al-Shahania		
2017–2018	Al-Arabi		
2018–2019	Al-Shahania		
2019–2020	Lusail		
2020–2023	Al-Waab		
- * Club domestic league appearances and goals

Jassem Al-Jaber (Arabic:جاسم الجابر) (born 15 April 1989) is a Qatari footballer. He currently plays as a left back.

== Career ==
He formerly played for Al-Arabi, Mesaimeer, Al-Shahania, and Lusail .
