= Abdulrahman Mohammed (footballer, born 1994) =

Qatari footballer

Personal information
- Full name: Abdulrahman Mohammed Abdulaziz
- Date of birth: 6 January 1994 (age 32)
- Place of birth: Qatar
- Position: Goalkeeper

Team information
- Current team: Mesaimeer
- Number: 31

Youth career
- –2013: Al-Markhiya
- 2013–2014: Al-Sailiya

Senior career*
Years	Team	Apps	(Gls)
2014–2023	Al-Sailiya	24	(0)
2023–	Mesaimeer	24	(0)
- * Club domestic league appearances and goals as of 29 April 2025

Abdulrahman Mohammed Abdulaziz (Arabic: عبد الرحمن محمد; born 6 January 1994) is a Qatari footballer. He currently plays for Mesaimeer as a goalkeeper.

== Club career ==
Mohammed began his professional career as a 19 yea old with Al-Sailiya, in 2013.

== Honours ==
=== Club ===
Al-Sailiya

- Qatari Stars Cup: 2020-21, 2021-22
- Qatar FA Cup: 2021
