= Adel Bader =

Qatari footballer (born 1997)

Personal information
- Full name: Adel Bader Farhan Mousa Al-Ahmed
- Date of birth: 17 January 1997 (age 29)
- Place of birth: Qatar
- Height: 1.80 m (5 ft 11 in)
- Position: Midfielder

Team information
- Current team: Al-Rayyan
- Number: 14

Senior career*
| Years | Team | Apps | (Gls) |
| 2015–2021 | Al-Duhail | 10 | (0) |
| 2016–2017 | → Al-Kharaitiyat (loan) | 11 | (0) |
| 2018–2019 | → Al-Khor (loan) | 4 | (0) |
| 2019–2021 | → Al-Sailiya (loan) | 38 | (0) |
| 2021–2023 | Al-Sailiya | 3 | (0) |
| 2023– | Al-Rayyan | 0 | (0) |
- * Club domestic league appearances and goals

Adel Bader (Arabic:عادل بدر) (born 17 January 1997) is a Qatari footballer. He currently plays for Al-Rayyan.

== Club career ==
Bader began his professional career with Al-Duhail SC in 2015. Between 2016 and 2021, he was loaned to Al-Kharaitiyat SC, Al-Khor SC and Al-Sailiya SC, staying with the latter club.

== Honours ==
=== Club ===
Al-Duhail SC

- Qatar Cup: 2018
- Sheikh Jassim Cup: 2015
- Emir of Qatar Cup: 2016, 2018
- Qatar Stars League: 2017-18

Al-Sailiya SC

- Qatar FA Cup: 2021
- Qatari Stars Cup: 2020-21, 2021-22
