= 2010–11 Qatari 2nd Division =

Qatari 2nd Division
- Season: 2010–11
- Champions: El Jaish
- Matches played: 45
- Goals scored: 141 (3.13 per match)
- Top goalscorer: Abdulgadir Ilyas Bakur (12 goals)

The 2010–11 Qatari 2nd Division season is the bottom level football championship in Qatar, and it started in November.

== Teams ==
El Jaish were promoted to the Qatar Stars League.

Club	City/Town	Stadium
Al-Markhiya Sports Club	Al Markhiya	Al-Markhiya Stadium
Al-Mesaimeer Sports Club	Mesaimeer	Al-Sailiya Stadium
Muaither SC	Muaither	Khalifa International Stadium
El Jaish	Duhail	Ahmed bin Ali Stadium
Al-Shahaniya Sports Club	Shahaniya	Al-Sailiya Stadium
Al-Shamal Sports Club	Madinat ash Shamal	Al-Shamal SC Stadium

== League table ==
Pos	Team	Pld	W	D	L	GF	GA	GD	Pts	Promotion or qualification
1	El Jaish	15	13	1	1	48	8	+40	40	Promotion
2	Al Shamal	15	9	3	3	28	11	+17	30	Promotion Playoff
3	Al Shahaniya	15	6	4	5	17	27	−10	22	
4	Mesaimeer	15	5	3	7	24	26	−2	18	
5	Al-Markhiya	15	2	5	8	18	32	−14	11	
6	Al-Mu'aidar	15	1	2	12	6	37	−31	5	

Updated to match(es) played on 6 November 2011. Source: 2nd Division Standings - QFA (in Arabic)
Rules for classification: 1) points; 2) goal difference; 3) number of goals scored.

== Top scorers ==
Rank	Scorer	Club	Goals
1	(Qatar) Abdulgadir Ilyas Bakur	El Jaish	12
2	(Nigeria) Hafiz Abdul Salam	El Jaish	11
3	(Ivory Coast) Herman Kaku	Mesaimeer	9
4	(Nigeria) Kesten Aiguilles	Al Markhiya	8
4	Bakari Dow	Al-Shamal	8
6	(Syria) Ismail Mahmoud	El Jaish	7
7	(Brazil) Renan Oliveira	Al-Shamal	6
7	(Brazil) Eduardo Bezerra Jukano	Al-Shahaniya	6
9	Mahmoud Abdul Hameed	El Jaish	5
10	(Qatar) Mohammed Juma	Al-Shamal	4

== See also ==
- 2010–11 Qatar Stars League
- Qatari 2nd Division
