= Khald Youssef Shurrab =

Qatari footballer (born 1999)

Khald Youssef خالد يوسف
Personal information
- Full name: Khald Youssef Shurrab
- Date of birth: 12 September 1999 (age 27)
- Place of birth: Qatar
- Position: Left back

Youth career
- -2017: El Jaish
- 2017-2018: Al-Duhail

Senior career*
Years	Team	Apps	(Gls)
2018–	Al-Duhail	0	(0)
2018–2019	→ Al-Khor (loan)	0	(0)
2021–2024	Al-Wakrah	21	(0)
2025	Mesaimeer	5	(0)
- * Club domestic league appearances and goals

Khald Youssef Shurrab (Arabic:خالد يوسف شراب) (born 12 September 1999) is a Qatari footballer who plays as a defender.
