= Saoud Nasser =

Qatari footballer (born 1990)

Personal information
- Full name: Saoud Nasser Mohammed Al-Dhahri
- Date of birth: 1 January 1990 (age 36)
- Place of birth: Qatar
- Position: Left-back

Senior career*
Years	Team	Apps	(Gls)
2012–2015	Al-Arabi	11	(0)
2015–2016	Mesaimeer	16	(1)
2016–2020	Al-Kharaitiyat	36	(2)
2020–2022	Al-Shamal	3	(0)
2022–2023	Al-Bidda		
- * Club domestic league appearances and goals

Saoud Nasser (Arabic:سعود ناصر) (born 1 January 1990) is a Qatari footballer. He currently plays as a left back.
