= Abdulla Atief =

Qatari footballer (born 1985)

Abdulla Atief عبد الله عاطف
Personal information
- Full name: Abdulla Atief Al-Mousa
- Date of birth: 14 December 1985 (age 40)
- Place of birth: Qatar
- Height: 1.75 m (5 ft 9 in)
- Position: Left back

Senior career*
Years	Team	Apps	(Gls)
2008–2012	Al-Khor		
2012–2013	Al-Arabi		
2013–2014	Muaither		
2014–2017	Al-Sailiya		
2015–2016	→ Mesaimeer (loan)		
2016–2017	→ Al-Shamal (loan)		
2019–2021	Al-Waab		
- * Club domestic league appearances and goals

Abdulla Atief (Arabic:عبد الله عاطف) (born 14 December 1985) is a Qatari professional footballer who plays as a left back.

== Career ==
He formerly played for Al-Khor, Al-Arabi, Muaither, Al-Sailiya, Mesaimeer, Al-Shamal, and Al-Waab .
