= Alhadj Moustafa =

Sudanese footballer (born 1992)

Alhadj Moustafa الحاج مصطفى
Personal information
- Full name: Alhadj Mohammed Moustafa
- Date of birth: 1 June 1992 (age 34)
- Place of birth: Sudan
- Height: 1.79 m (5 ft 10 in)
- Position: Defender

Youth career
- El Jaish

Senior career*
Years	Team	Apps	(Gls)
2011–2012	El Jaish		
2012–2016	Mesaimeer		
2016–2018	Al-Markhiya		
2018–2019	Al-Khor		
2019–2023	Al-Kharaitiyat		
2021	→ Al-Shamal (loan)		
- * Club domestic league appearances and goals

Alhadj Moustafa (Arabic:الحاج مصطفى; born 1 June 1992) is a Sudanese footballer who plays as a defender.

== Career ==
He formerly played for El Jaish, Mesaimeer, Al-Markhiya, Al-Khor, Al-Kharaitiyat, and Al-Shamal.
