= Saoud Al-Ali =

Qatari footballer (born 1989)

Saoud Al-Ali سعود العلي
Personal information
- Full name: Saoud Salem Al-Ali Al-Enezi
- Date of birth: 29 October 1989 (age 37)
- Place of birth: Qatar
- Height: 1.70 m (5 ft 7 in)
- Position: Midfielder

Youth career
- Qatar

Senior career*
Years	Team	Apps	(Gls)
2010–2011	Al-Khor		
2011–2012	Al-Kharaitiyat		
2012–2015	Al-Rayyan		
2013–2014	→ Muaither (loan)		
2014–2015	→ Al-Shamal (loan)		
2015–2019	Mesaimeer		
2019–2021	Lusail		
- * Club domestic league appearances and goals

Saoud Al-Ali (Arabic:سعود العلي) (born 29 October 1989) is a Qatari footballer who plays as a midfielder .

== Career ==
He formerly played for Qatar, Al-Khor, Al-Kharaitiyat, Al-Rayyan, Muaither, Al-Shamal, Mesaimeer and Lusail .
