= Abdulgadir Ilyas Bakur =

Qatari football player (born 1990)

Abdulgadir Ilyas
Personal information
- Full name: Abdulgadir Ilyas Bakur
- Date of birth: 17 August 1990 (age 36)
- Place of birth: Mecca, Saudi Arabia
- Height: 1.86 m (6 ft 1 in)
- Position: Forward

Team information
- Current team: Al-Markhiya
- Number: 55

Senior career*
Years	Team	Apps	(Gls)
2008–2017	El Jaish	67	(14)
2014–2015	→ Umm Salal (loan)	8	(7)
2015	→ Al-Sailiya (loan)	14	(6)
2016	→ Umm Salal (loan)	9	(4)
2017–2018	Al-Markhiya	12	(2)
2018–2023	Al-Sailiya	54	(17)
2021–2022	→ Al-Arabi (loan)	20	(5)
2025–	Al-Markhiya	1	(0)

International career^{‡}
2013–2018	Qatar	15	(4)
- * Club domestic league appearances and goals as of 25 July 2023 ‡ National team caps and goals as of 25 July 2023

Abdulgadir Ilyas Bakur is a football player. He currently plays for Al-Markhiya as a forward. Born in Saudi Arabia, he represented Qatar at international level.

He is the older brother of footballer Imran Ilyas Bakur. His talents were discovered by El Jaish coach Mohammed Al Ammari and in 2008, he moved to Qatar at the age of 19. On September 18, 2011, Bakur made his professional debut for El Jaish as starter in a league match against Al-Khor.

== International goals ==
Score and result lists Qatar's goal tally first.

#	Date	Venue	Opponent	Score	Result	Competition
1.	18 June 2013	Bunyodkor Stadium, Tashkent, Uzbekistan	Uzbekistan	1–0	1–5	2014 FIFA World Cup qualification
2.	23 September 2013	Jassim Bin Hamad Stadium, Doha, Qatar	Mauritius	1–0	3–0	Friendly
3.	14 July 2014	Saoud bin Abdulrahman Stadium, Al Wakrah, Qatar	Indonesia	2–1	2–2	Friendly
4.	6 November 2014	Abdullah bin Khalifa Stadium, Doha, Qatar	North Korea	1–0	3–1	Friendly

== Honours ==
=== Club ===
El-Jaish

- Qatari Stars Cup: 2012-13
- Qatar Cup: 2014

Al-Sailiya

- Qatar FA Cup: 2021

Al-Arabi

- Qatar FA Cup: 2022

Individual

- Qatari 2nd Division: Top scorer 2010–11

=== National ===
Qatar

- Arabian Gulf Cup: 2014
