= Ahmed Al-Asker =

Qatari footballer (born 1994)

Personal information
- Full name: Ahmed Salem Qassem Al-Asker
- Date of birth: 1 June 1994 (age 32)
- Place of birth: Qatar
- Position: Winger

Team information
- Current team: Al-Kharaitiyat
- Number: 98

Youth career
- Al-Gharafa

Senior career*
Years	Team	Apps	(Gls)
2014–2015	Al-Gharafa	0	(0)
2015–2017	Al-Sailiya	6	(0)
2017–2018	Al-Markhiya	1	(0)
2018–2020	Al-Khor	19	(0)
2020–2021	Mesaimeer		
2021–2022	Al-Waab		
2022–2023	Mesaimeer		
2023–2025	Al-Waab		
2025–	Al-Kharaitiyat		
- * Club domestic league appearances and goals

Ahmed Al-Asker (Arabic:أحمد العسكر) (born 1 June 1994) is a Qatari footballer. He currently plays for Al-Kharaitiyat as a winger.
