= Aaron Boupendza =

Gabonese footballer (1996–2025)

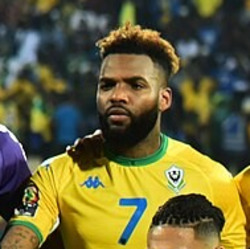
- Boupendza in 2022

Personal information
- Full name: Aaron Salem Boupendza Pozzi
- Date of birth: 7 August 1996
- Place of birth: Moanda, Gabon
- Date of death: 16 April 2025 (aged 28)
- Place of death: Hangzhou, China
- Height: 1.80 m (5 ft 11 in)
- Position: Forward

Youth career
- –2015: CF Mounana

Senior career*
Years	Team	Apps	(Gls)
2015–2016	CF Mounana	6	(6)
2016–2017	Bordeaux B	20	(8)
2017–2020	Bordeaux	0	(0)
2017–2018	→ Pau (loan)	21	(15)
2017–2018	→ Pau B (loan)	3	(2)
2018	→ Gazélec Ajaccio (loan)	10	(0)
2018–2019	→ Tours (loan)	12	(3)
2019	→ Tours B (loan)	1	(0)
2019–2020	→ Feirense (loan)	9	(0)
2020–2021	Hatayspor	36	(22)
2021–2022	Al-Arabi	17	(8)
2022–2023	Al-Shabab	17	(11)
2023–2024	FC Cincinnati	24	(7)
2024–2025	Rapid București	9	(3)
2025	Zhejiang FC	6	(4)
Total		191	(89)

International career
2016–2023	Gabon	35	(8)
- * Club domestic league appearances and goals

Aaron Salem Boupendza Pozzi (7 August 1996 – 16 April 2025) was a Gabonese professional footballer who played as a forward.

Trained at CF Mounana, where he won the Gabon Championnat National D1 in 2015–16, he signed for Bordeaux in 2016. He played only for the reserve team and out on loan, finishing as top scorer of the Championnat National for Pau in 2017–18. In 2020 he signed for Hatayspor, and was top scorer in the Süper Lig in 2020–21. He then had one season each with Al Arabi of the Qatar Stars League and Al Shabab of the Saudi Pro League, winning a Qatar FA Cup with the former in 2022. He won the Supporters' Shield with FC Cincinnati in 2023, and had brief spells with Rapid București in Romania and Zhejiang FC in China before his death at age 28.

A full international for the Gabon national team since 2016, Boupendza represented the country at the 2021 Africa Cup of Nations.

== Club career ==
=== Bordeaux ===
Born in Moanda, Boupendza came through the youth ranks of CF Mounana, where he won the Gabon Championnat National D1 in 2015–16. He had a trial at Tours of the French Ligue 2 in February 2016.

In August 2016, Boupendza signed for Ligue 1 side Bordeaux to play for the club's reserve team in fifth-tier Championnat National 3. A year later, he joined Championnat National side Pau FC on loan. He was the top scorer of the 2017–18 Championnat National with 15 goals.

Boupendza signed a new contract in July 2018 to keep himself at the Nouveau Stade de Bordeaux until 2021, while also being loaned out to Gazélec Ajaccio of Ligue 2. On 9 December, his loan was terminated by mutual agreement of both clubs, after he did not score in 11 total appearances. He was then loaned to Tours in the division below.

In July 2019, Boupendza was loaned to Feirense in the Portuguese LigaPro. Having not scored in 11 total matches for Filó's team, his contract was rescinded in March for refusing to join the reserve team.

=== Hatayspor ===
In August 2020, after being released by Bordeaux, Boupendza signed a two-year deal at Hatayspor, newly promoted to the Turkish Süper Lig. He was the top scorer in his first season with 22 goals in 36 games as the team from Antakya came sixth; teammate Mame Biram Diouf was second with 19 goals. He scored four times on 29 December in a 6–0 win at Antalyaspor, and twice on 10 January 2021 in a 2–2 draw with eventual winners Beşiktaş J.K. at the Antakya Atatürk Stadyumu.

=== Arabian Peninsula ===
In August 2021, Boupendza joined Qatar Stars League club Al-Arabi SC for €4.5 million. On 8 May 2022, he scored after three minutes in a 3–2 win over Lusail SC to lift the Qatar FA Cup.

Boupendza signed a three-year deal at Al Shabab FC of the Saudi Pro League in August 2022. He scored 11 goals in 17 games in his one league season in Riyadh, including four on 31 May as the campaign concluded with a 4–1 win at Damac FC.

=== FC Cincinnati ===
In June 2023, Major League Soccer club FC Cincinnati announced they had signed Boupendza from Al-Shabab on a transfer, with the striker signing a Designated Player deal through 2025, with options for 2026 and 2027. He arrived after the club had sold leading striker Brenner to Udinese Calcio. His five regular-season goals helped the team win the Eastern Conference, including the season-clinching goal to capture the Supporters' Shield. On 4 November, he equalised in a 1–1 draw away to the New York Red Bulls before netting in a penalty shootout win in the first round of the 2023 MLS Cup Playoffs.

Boupendza's contract was terminated early by Major League Soccer on 8 August 2024, for not fulfilling contractual obligations. He had been involved in several incidents during his time at the club, including being suspended for returning late from international play in October 2023, being the victim of a sex tape blackmail in January 2024, and having his jaw broken by a professional boxer in a fight in April 2024.

=== Rapid București and Zhejiang FC ===
In September 2024, Boupendza signed a two-year contract for Liga I club Rapid București.

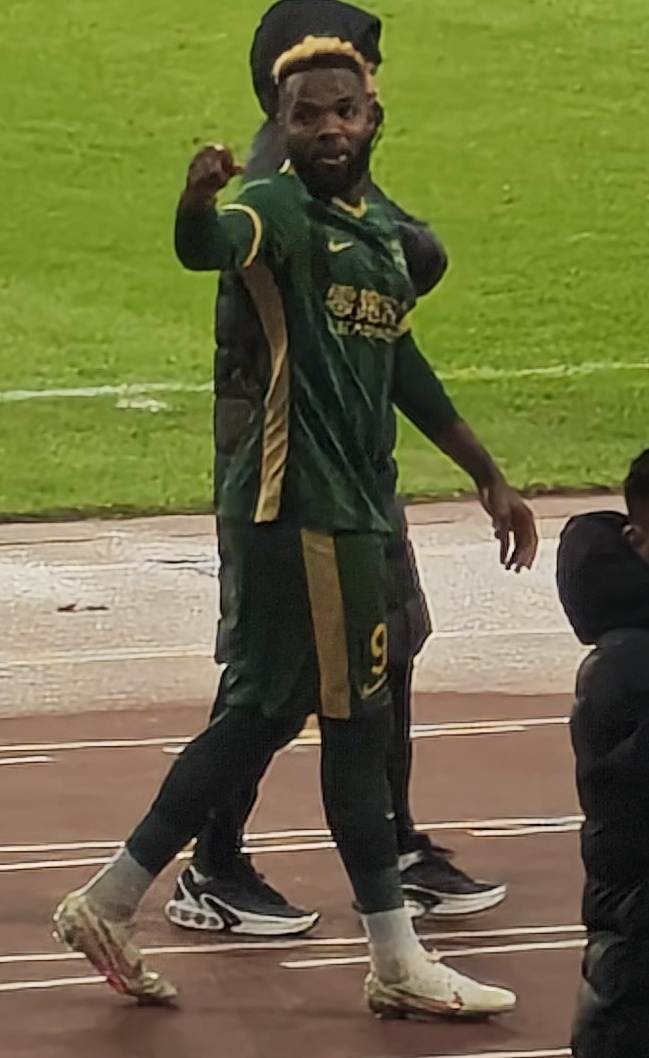
Boupendza after a Zhejiang FC match

Alleging that he was owed performance-based bonuses, Boupendza did not return to Romania after a training camp in Dubai in January 2025. He moved to China to pursue offers from two clubs, while saying that he would not return to Romania; Rapid suspended him indefinitely for this decision. By the end of the month, he had signed for Zhejiang FC for a fee of €800,000; Gazeta Sporturilor noted that this was a profit as he had arrived for free, but his salary had been €50,000 per month. He scored five goals during his time in Bucharest, over nine games in Liga I and two in the Cupa României.

Boupendza, who doubled his salary with his move, played six games in the Chinese Super League, scoring four goals. His goals came as braces in a 4–0 win away to Wuhan Three Towns on 28 March and a 3–0 win at home to Shenzhen Peng City four days later.

== International career ==
Boupendza was first called up for Gabon in January 2016 for the African Nations Championship. He made his debut on 10 January in a 1–1 friendly draw away to Uganda, and scored his first goal as consolation in a 2–1 loss to hosts Rwanda in the group stage.

Boupendza was called up for the 2021 Africa Cup of Nations in Cameroon, where he scored the only goal of the opening group win against the Comoros, who were making their tournament debut. In the last 16 against Burkina Faso, he netted his attempt in a penalty shootout defeat.

In November 2023, the Gabonese Football Federation suspended Boupendza and Didier Ndong for arriving late to the country ahead of a game against Kenya.

== Death ==
Boupendza died on 16 April 2025, after falling from the 11th floor of a building in Hangzhou, China. He was 28. Gabonese President Brice Oligui Nguema paid tribute to him shortly after his death. Chinese police investigations concluded that the fall was accidental, ruling out criminal activity.

Hours after Boupendza's death, his club Zheijiang played a home game against Meizhou Hakka, a decision widely condemned on Chinese social media platforms. None of the club's other foreigners played in the game, and after the 2–2 draw, captain Cheng Jin and manager Raúl Caneda cut short their interviews due to grief.

== Career statistics ==
=== Club ===
Appearances and goals by club, season and competition
Club	Season	League			National cup (Note: Includes Coupe de France, Taça de Portugal, Turkish Cup, Emir Cup, U.S. Open Cup, Cupa României)		League cup (Note: Includes Coupe de la Ligue, Taça da Liga, Qatar FA Cup)		Continental		Other		Total	
Club	Season	Division	Apps	Goals	Apps	Goals	Apps	Goals	Apps	Goals	Apps	Goals	Apps	Goals
CF Mounana	2015–16	Gabon Championnat National D1	6	6	—		—		—		—		6	6
Bordeaux B	2016–17	CFA 2	20	8	—		—		—		—		20	8
Pau (loan)	2017–18	Championnat National	21	15	0	0	—		—		—		21	15
Pau B (loan)	2017–18	Championnat National 3	3	2	—		—		—		—		3	2
Gazélec Ajaccio (loan)	2018–19	Ligue 2	10	0	0	0	1	0	—		—		11	0
Tours (loan)	2018–19	Championnat National	12	3	1	1	—		—		—		13	4
Tours B (loan)	2018–19	Championnat National 3	1	0	—		—		—		—		1	0
Feirense (loan)	2019–20	Primeira Liga	9	0	2	0	1	0	—		—		12	0
Hatayspor	2020–21	Süper Lig	36	22	2	0	—		—		—		38	22
Al-Arabi	2021–22	Qatar Stars League	16	8	0	0	3	1	—		3 (Note: Appearances in Qatari Stars Cup)	1	22	10
Al-Arabi	2022–23	Qatar Stars League	1	0	1	0	—		—		—		2	0
Al-Arabi	Total		17	8	1	0	3	1	—		3	1	24	10
Al Shabab	2022–23	Saudi Pro League	17	11	0	0	—		0	0	—		17	11
FC Cincinnati	2023	MLS	10	5	1	0	—		—		7 (Note: Four appearances and one goal in MLS Cup playoffs, three appearances in Leagues Cup)	1	18	6
FC Cincinnati	2024	MLS	14	2	—		—		3 (Note: Appearances in CONCACAF Champions Cup)	1	—		17	3
FC Cincinnati	Total		24	7	1	0	0	0	3	1	7	1	35	9
Rapid București	2024–25	Liga I	9	3	2	2	—		—		—		11	5
Zhejiang FC	2025	Chinese Super League	6	4	0	0	—		—		—		6	4
Career total			191	89	9	3	5	1	3	1	10	2	218	96

=== International ===
Appearances and goals by national team and year
National team	Year	Apps	Goals
Gabon	2016	4	1
Gabon	2017	6	0
Gabon	2018	0	0
Gabon	2019	3	2
Gabon	2020	3	0
Gabon	2021	7	1
Gabon	2022	7	3
Gabon	2023	5	1
Total		35	8

Scores and results list Gabon's goal tally first, score column indicates score after each Boupendza goal.

List of international goals scored by Aaron Boupendza
No.	Date	Venue	Opponent	Score	Result	Competition
1	20 January 2016	Amahoro Stadium, Kigali, Rwanda	Rwanda	1–2	1–2	2016 African Nations Championship
2	15 October 2019	Stade Ibn Batouta, Tangier, Morocco	Morocco	1–0	3–2	Friendly
3	17 November 2019	Stade de Franceville, Franceville, Gabon	Angola	1–0	2–1	2021 Africa Cup of Nations qualification
4	25 March 2021	Stade de Franceville, Franceville, Gabon	DR Congo	1–0	3–0	2021 Africa Cup of Nations qualification
5	10 January 2022	Stade Ahmadou Ahidjo, Yaoundé, Cameroon	Comoros	1–0	1–0	2021 Africa Cup of Nations
6	17 November 2022	Atilla Vehbi Konuk Tesisleri, Antalya, Turkey	Guinea-Bissau	1–0	3–1	Friendly
7	17 November 2022	Atilla Vehbi Konuk Tesisleri, Antalya, Turkey	Guinea-Bissau	2–1	3–1	Friendly
8	17 October 2023	Estádio Algarve, Algarve, Portugal	Guinea	1–0	1–1	Friendly

== Honours ==
CF Mounana

- Gabon Championnat National D1: 2015–16

Al-Arabi

- Qatar FA Cup: 2022

FC Cincinnati

- Supporters' Shield: 2023

Individual

- Süper Lig Golden Boot: 2020–21
- Süper Lig Team of the Season: 2020–21
