= Al-Anzi =

Al-Anzi or Al Anzi (Arabic: العنزي) is an Arabic surname, originating from the Anizah tribe. Notable people with the surname include:

- Abdallah Al Anzi (born 1995), Qatari footballer
- Ahmed Al-Anzi (born 1999), Saudi Arabian footballer
- Meshal Al-Anzi (born 1972), Kuwaiti footballer
- Nouf Al Anzi (born 1996), Emirati footballer
- Safaq Al-Anzi (born 1943), Saudi Arabian sport shooter
