= Muaaz Yousef =

Qatari footballer (born 1984)

Personal information
- Full name: Muaaz Yousef Adam
- Date of birth: 1 January 1984 (age 42)
- Place of birth: Qatar
- Position: Full-back

Senior career*
Years	Team	Apps	(Gls)
2002–2003	Al-Mesaimeer		
2003–2012	Al-Arabi		
2012–2014	Al-Wakra		
2014–2016	Al-Rayyan		
2016–2014	Al-Shahania		
- * Club domestic league appearances and goals

Muaaz Yousef (Arabic: معاذ يوسف ; born 1 January 1984) is a Qatari footballer.
