= 2021 Qatar FA Cup =

Tournament details
- Country: Qatar
- Dates: 15 April 2021 – 5 May 2021
- Teams: 17

Final positions
- Champions: Al-Sailiya SC (1st title)
- Runners-up: Al-Markhiya SC

Tournament statistics
- Matches played: 28
- Goals scored: 94 (3.36 per match)

The 2021 Qatar FA Cup was the first edition of the Qatari cup tournament in men's football. It was played by the bottom 8 teams from the Qatar Stars League and the entire Qatari Second Division.

The tournament featured 17 teams divided into 5 groups.

== Round One Groups ==
Group A	Group B	Group C	Group D	Group E
Mesaimeer SC; Al Bidda SC; Al-Khor SC; Al Ahli SC	Al-Markhiya SC; Al-Gharafa SC; Qatar SC; Al Shahaniya SC	Muaither SC; Umm Salal SC; Al-Wakrah SC	Al-Arabi SC; Al-Shamal SC; Al Kharaitiyat SC	Al-Sailiya SC; Lusail SC; Al-Waab SC

=== Standings ===
==== Group A ====
Pos	Team	Pld	W	D	L	GF	GA	GD	Pts
1	Mesaimeer SC	3	2	1	0	4	2	+2	7
2	Al Bidda SC	3	1	1	1	2	2	0	4
3	Al-Khor SC	3	1	0	2	5	4	+1	3
4	Al Ahli SC	3	0	2	1	5	8	−3	2

Rules for classification: 1) points; 2) goal difference; 3) number of goals scored.

===== Results =====
Date	Team 1	Score	Team 2
2021/04/15	Al Ahli SC	2–2	Mesaimeer SC
2021/04/15	Al-Khor SC	0–1	Al Bidda SC
2021/04/19	Al-Khor SC	0–1	Mesaimeer SC
2021/04/19	Al Bidda SC	1–1	Al Ahli SC
2021/04/23	Al Ahli SC	2–5	Al-Khor SC
2021/04/23	Al Bidda SC	0–1	Mesaimeer SC

==== Group B ====
Pos	Team	Pld	W	D	L	GF	GA	GD	Pts
1	Al-Markhiya SC	3	2	1	0	6	4	+2	7
2	Al-Gharafa SC	3	2	0	1	7	4	+3	6
3	Qatar SC	3	1	1	1	4	5	−1	4
4	Al Shahaniya SC	3	0	0	3	1	5	−4	0

Rules for classification: 1) points; 2) goal difference; 3) number of goals scored.

===== Results =====
Date	Team 1	Score	Team 2
2021/04/16	Qatar SC	2–0	Al Shahaniya SC
2021/04/16	Al Gharafa SC	2–3	Al-Markhiya SC
2021/04/20	Al-Markhiya SC	2–0	Qatar SC
2021/04/20	Al Shahaniya SC	1–2	Al Gharafa SC
2021/04/24	Al Shahaniya SC	0–1	Al-Markhiya SC
2021/04/24	Al-Gharafa SC	3–0	Qatar SC

==== Group C ====
Pos	Team	Pld	W	D	L	GF	GA	GD	Pts
1	Muaither SC	2	2	0	0	3	1	+2	6
2	Umm Salal SC	2	1	0	1	5	3	+2	3
3	Al-Wakrah SC	2	0	0	2	1	5	−4	0

Rules for classification: 1) points; 2) goal difference; 3) number of goals scored.

===== Results =====
Date	Team 1	Score	Team 2
2021/04/16	Umm Salal SC	1–2	Muaither SC
2021/04/20	Muaither SC	1–0	Al-Wakrah SC
2021/04/24	Al-Wakrah SC	1–4	Umm Salal SC

==== Group D ====
Pos	Team	Pld	W	D	L	GF	GA	GD	Pts
1	Al-Arabi SC	2	1	0	1	4	3	+1	3
2	Al-Shamal SC	2	1	0	1	5	5	0	3
3	Al Kharaitiyat SC	2	1	0	1	3	4	−1	3

Rules for classification: 1) points; 2) goal difference; 3) number of goals scored.

===== Results =====
Date	Team 1	Score	Team 2
2021/04/17	Al-Arabi SC	2–3	Al-Shamal SC
2021/04/21	Al-Shamal SC	2–3	Al Kharaitiyat SC
2021/04/25	Al Kharaitiyat SC	0–2	Al-Arabi SC

==== Group E ====
Pos	Team	Pld	W	D	L	GF	GA	GD	Pts
1	Al-Sailiya SC	2	2	0	0	3	1	+2	6
2	Lusail SC	2	1	0	1	2	2	0	3
3	Al-Waab SC	2	0	0	2	2	4	−2	0

Rules for classification: 1) points; 2) goal difference; 3) number of goals scored.

===== Results =====
Date	Team 1	Score	Team 2
2021/04/17	Al-Waab SC	1–2	Lusail SC
2021/04/21	Lusail SC	0–1	Al-Sailiya SC
2021/04/25	Al-Sailiya SC	2–1	Al-Waab SC

== Knockout round ==
=== Quarter-finals ===
28 April 2021
19:00 AST (UTC+3)

Mesaimeer SC	1–4	Al-Markhiya SC
Abubakar Bayomi 78'		Faisal Mohamed Al Qhatani 22'; Ahmed Al Douni 35'; Sid Ali Lakroum 49', 85'

28 April 2021
19:00 AST (UTC+3)

Muaither SC	1–4	Al-Gharafa SC
Yousef Al-Rawashdeh 19'		Jonathan Kodjia 50'; Amro Surag 87'

29 April 2021
19:00 AST (UTC+3)

Al-Arabi SC	3–0	Umm Salal
Aron Gunnarsson 23'; Youssef Msakni 30'; Fahad Khalfan 83'

29 April 2021
19:00 AST (UTC+3)

Al-Sailiya SC	4–2	Al-Shamal SC
Thiago Bezerra 16', 72'; Abdulqader Elyass 78'; Meshaal Al-Shammeri 94'		Baha' Faisal 43', 91'

=== Semi-finals ===
2 May 2021
19:00 AST (UTC+3)

Al-Arabi SC	1–3	Al-Sailiya SC
Youssef Msakni 15'		Abdulkqader Elyass 51', 84'; Saad Hussein Al Sowan 91'

2 May 2021
19:00 AST (UTC+3)

Al-Markhiya SC	5–3	Al-Gharafa SC
Ahmed Al Doun 41', 67'; Mohamed Arafah 55'; Jameel Al-Yahmadi 70'; Ali Al-Muhannadi 93'		Wilfried Kanon 29'; Othman Al-Yahri 85'; Ahmed Al Ganehi 95'

== Final ==
5 May 2021
19:00 AST (UTC+3)

Al-Sailiya SC	1–0	Al-Markhiya SC
Thiago Bezerra 74'
