= Amer Al Dossari =

Qatari footballer

Personal information
- Full name: Amer Abdullah Al Dossari
- Date of birth: 2 March 1977 (age 49)
- Place of birth: Doha, Qatar
- Position: Goalkeeper

Senior career*
| Years | Team | Apps | (Gls) |
| 1997–2004 | Al-Markhiya | | |
| 2004–2017 | Al Ahli | | |
| 2006–2007 | → Al Arabi (loan) | | |
| 2007 | → Qatar SC (loan) | | |
| 2007–2008 | → Al Gharrafa (loan) | | |
| 2008–2009 | → Al Sailiya (loan) | | |
| 2011–2012 | → El Jaish (loan) | | |

International career
- Qatar
- * Club domestic league appearances and goals

Amer Al Dossari (Arabic: عامر الدوسري) (born 2 March 1984) is a Qatari footballer.
