= Fred Dabanka =

Ghanaian footballer (born 1993)

Personal information
- Date of birth: 17 June 1993 (age 33)
- Place of birth: Ghana
- Height: 1.80 m (5 ft 11 in)
- Position: Defender

Senior career*
Years	Team	Apps	(Gls)
2012–2020	Al Ahli	89	(2)
2017–2018	→ Mesaimeer (loan)		
2018–2020	→ Al-Shamal (loan)		
2020–2021	Al-Markhiya		
- * Club domestic league appearances and goals

Fred Dabanka (born 17 June 1993) is a Ghanaian footballer who plays as a defender.
