= 2024–25 Aris Thessaloniki F.C. season =

Aris Thessaloniki
- President: Irini Karipidis
- Manager: Akis Mantzios (until 8 December); Marinos Ouzounidis (from 12 December)
- Stadium: Kleanthis Vikelidis Stadium
- Super League 1: 5th
- Greek Cup: Round of 16
- Top goalscorer: League: Loren Morón (18); All: Loren Morón (19)
Home colours	Away colours	Third colours

The 2024–25 season was the 111th season in the existence of Aris Thessaloniki F.C. and the club's 7th consecutive season in the top flight of Greek football since their return there. In addition to the Super League 1, Aris participated in the season's editions of the Greek Cup.

== Season Review ==
Apostolos Mantzios remained as manager from the previous season. However, he was sacked on December 8th. Four days later, his replacement, Marinos Ouzounidis, was hired.

In the Super League 1, Aris started with back-to-back away matches, resulting in one draw and one win. After a defeat from OFI in Crete, Aris beat Olympiacos at home and PAOK at the Toumba Stadium. With 4 wins in a row, Aris reached the top of the league after eight games. A draw in Athens with Panathinaikos on matchday 9 and a home win against Levadiakos meant that Aris was staying atop the table until 3 November. Three consecutive defeats in November resulted in Aris dropping to 5th place.

After the end of the regular season and the 5th place, Aris participated in the European play-offs. The teams that entered this round, did it with half of points they won during the regular season. With 4 wins in 6 games, Aris finished in 5th place of the European play-off.

In the Greek Cup, Aris entered in Fourth Round due to the 5th place finish in the previous season's Super League. Aris beat Ethnikos Piraeus 1-0, but was eliminated by AEK Athens in the Round of 16 with a 2-1 aggregate loss.

== First-team squad ==
#	Name	Nationality	Position(s)	Date of birth (age)	Signed from
Goalkeepers
20	Filip Sidklev	(Sweden)	GK	12 March 2005 (age 21)	(Sweden) Brommapojkarna
23	Julián Cuesta (captain)	(Spain)	GK	28 March 1991 (age 35)	(Poland) Wisła Kraków
31	Konstantinos Kyriazis	(Greece)	GK	4 March 2004 (age 22)	Club's Academy
Defenders
3	Fabiano Leismann	(Brazil)	CB / RB	18 November 1991 (age 34)	(Turkey) Denizlispor
4	Fran Vélez	(Spain)	CB / DM	23 June 1991 (age 35)	(Saudi Arabia) Al Fateh
14	Jakub Brabec (vice-captain)	(Czech Republic)	CB	6 August 1992 (age 33)	(Czech Republic) Viktoria Plzeň
17	Martin Frýdek	(Czech Republic)	LB / LM / CM	24 March 1992 (age 34)	(Switzerland) Luzern
18	Valentino Fattore	(Spain) / (Argentina)	RB / CB	10 August 2001 (age 24)	(Spain) Sevilla Atlético
22	Hugo Mallo	(Spain)	RB	22 June 1991 (age 35)	(Brazil) Internacional
24	Marko Kerkez	(Serbia) / (Hungary)	LB / CB / LM	26 June 2000 (age 26)	(Serbia) Partizan
27	Juankar	(Spain)	LB / LM / LW	30 March 1990 (age 36)	(Greece) Panathinaikos
33	Martín Montoya	(Spain)	RB / LB	14 April 1991 (age 35)	(Spain) Real Betis
37	Hamza Mendyl	(Morocco) / (Ivory Coast)	LB / LM	21 October 1997 (age 28)	(Belgium) OH Leuven
92	Lindsay Rose	(Mauritius) / (France)	CB / RB	8 February 1992 (age 34)	(Poland) Legia Warsaw
Midfielders
5	José Cifuentes	(Ecuador)	CM / DM / AM	12 March 1999 (age 27)	(Scotland) Rangers
8	Monchu Rodríguez	(Spain)	CM / DM	13 September 1999 (age 26)	(Spain) Real Valladolid
16	Vladimír Darida	(Czech Republic)	CM / AM / DM	8 August 1990 (age 35)	(Germany) Hertha BSC
21	Rubén Pardo	(Spain)	CM / AM / DM	22 October 1992 (age 33)	(Spain) Leganés
25	Mamadou Gning	(Senegal)	AM / CM / LW	22 December 2006 (age 19)	(Senegal) Espoirs de Guédiawaye
30	Jean Jules	(Cameroon)	DM / CM	23 April 1998 (age 28)	(Poland) Górnik Zabrze
Forwards
7	Pione Sisto	(Denmark) / (South Sudan)	LW / RW / AM	4 February 1995 (age 31)	(Turkey) Alanyaspor
9	Álvaro Zamora	(Costa Rica)	LW / RW / ST	9 March 2002 (age 24)	(Costa Rica) Saprissa
10	Giannis Fetfatzidis	(Greece)	LW / RW / AM	21 December 1990 (age 35)	(Cyprus) APOEL
11	Kike Saverio	(Ecuador) / (Spain)	LW / RW	19 June 1999 (age 27)	(Spain) Deportivo de La Coruña
19	Robin Quaison	(Sweden) / (Ghana)	ST / SS / LW	9 October 1993 (age 32)	Free Agent
28	Dudu Rodrigues	(Brazil)	RW	17 July 2002 (age 24)	(Bulgaria) Cherno More
41	Theodoros Agorastos	(Greece)	ST	30 November 2005 (age 20)	Club's Academy
70	Dario Špikić	(Croatia)	LW / RW / SS	22 March 1999 (age 27)	(Croatia) Dinamo Zagreb
77	Michalis Panagidis	(Greece)	LW / RW / AM	11 February 2004 (age 22)	Club's Academy
80	Loren Morón	(Spain)	ST	30 December 1993 (age 32)	(Spain) Real Betis
99	Clayton Diandy	(Senegal) / (Guinea-Bissau)	LW / RW / ST	29 July 2006 (age 19)	(Senegal) Espoirs de Guédiawaye

== Transfers and loans ==
=== Transfers in ===
Entry date	Position	No.	Player	From club	Fee	Ref.
July 2024	FW	93	(Russia) Shapi Suleymanov	(Russia) Krasnodar	1.000.000 €	
July 2024	FW	7	(Denmark) / (South Sudan) Pione Sisto	(Turkey) Alanyaspor	Free	
July 2024	FW	99	(Senegal) / (Guinea-Bissau) Clayton Diandy	(Senegal) Espoirs de Guédiawaye	Free	
July 2024	DF	22	(Spain) Hugo Mallo	(Brazil) Internacional	Free	
August 2024	MF	8	(Spain) Monchu Rodríguez	(Spain) Real Valladolid	3.600.000 €	
August 2024	FW	-	(Greece) Georgios Pamlidis	(Greece) PAS Giannina	Free	
August 2024	GK	20	(Sweden) Filip Sidklev	(Sweden) Brommapojkarna	600.000 €	
August 2024	DF	17	(Czech Republic) Martin Frýdek	(Switzerland) Luzern	Free	
September 2024	DF	27	(Spain) Juankar	(Greece) Panathinaikos	Free	
September 2024	FW	19	(Sweden) / (Ghana) Robin Quaison	Free Agent	Free	
January 2025	DF	37	(Morocco) / (Ivory Coast) Hamza Mendyl	(Belgium) OH Leuven	Free	
January 2025	MF	25	(Senegal) Mamadou Gning	(Senegal) Espoirs de Guédiawaye	2.000.000 €	
January 2025	FW	28	(Brazil) Dudu Rodrigues	(Bulgaria) Cherno More	1.500.000 €	

=== Transfers out ===
Exit date	Position	No.	Player	To club	Fee	Ref.
June 2024	GK	94	(Greece) Lefteris Choutesiotis	Free Agent	Released	
June 2024	GK	-	(Ukraine) Maksym Koval	Free Agent	Released	
June 2024	DF	13	(Costa Rica) Rónald Matarrita	Free Agent	Released	
June 2024	MF	8	(Ivory Coast) / (France) Cheick Doukouré	Free Agent	Released	
June 2024	MF	10	(Germany) Lukas Rupp	Free Agent	Released	
June 2024	FW	7	(Greece) Lazaros Christodoulopoulos	Free Agent	Released	
June 2024	FW	17	(Iran) Karim Ansarifard	Free Agent	Released	
July 2024	MF	28	(Belgium) Birger Verstraete	(Belgium) OH Leuven	200.000 €	
July 2024	DF	22	(England) / (Nigeria) Moses Odubajo	(Greece) AEK Athens	1.000.000 €	
July 2024	MF	20	(Croatia) Neven Đurasek	Free Agent	Released	
July 2024	DF	5	(Greece) Georgios Delizisis	Retired		
August 2024	DF	3	(Argentina) / (Italy) Franco Ferrari	Free Agent	Released	
February 2025	MF	6	(Spain) Manu García	(United States) Sporting Kansas City	3.600.000 €	
February 2025	FW	93	(Russia) Shapi Suleymanov	(United States) Sporting Kansas City	2.400.000 €	

=== Loans in ===
Start date	End date	Position	No.	Player	From club	Fee	Ref.
August 2024	June 2025	MF	5	(Ecuador) José Cifuentes	(Scotland) Rangers	None	
January 2025	June 2025	DF	24	(Serbia) / (Hungary) Marko Kerkez	(Serbia) Partizan	None	
January 2025	June 2025	FW	70	(Croatia) Dario Špikić	(Croatia) Dinamo Zagreb	None	

=== Loans out ===
Start date	End date	Position	No.	Player	To club	Fee	Ref.
August 2024	June 2025	FW	-	(Greece) Georgios Pamlidis	(Greece) Kalamata	None	
September 2024	June 2025	MF	24	(Croatia) Domagoj Pavičić	(Bosnia and Herzegovina) FK Sarajevo	None	

== Competitions ==
=== Overall ===
Competition	Started round	Final position / round	First match	Last match
Super League 1	Matchday 1	5th	18 August 2024	10 May 2025
Regular Season	Matchday 1	5th	18 August 2024	9 March 2025
Europe play-offs	Matchday 1	5th	29 March 2025	10 May 2025
Greek Cup	Fourth Round	Round of 16	29 September 2024	

Updated to match played 13 April 2025
Source: Competitions

=== Overview ===
Competition	Record							
Competition	G	W	D	L	GF	GA	GD	Win %
Super League 1	32	16	8	8	42	32	+10	50.00
Greek Cup	3	1	1	1	2	2	+0	33.33
Total	35	17	9	9	44	34	+10	48.57

Updated to match played 21 July 2025
Source: Competitions

Super League 1	Record							
Super League 1	G	W	D	L	GF	GA	GD	Win %
Regular Season	26	12	6	8	31	28	+3	46.15
Europe play-offs	6	4	2	0	11	4	+7	66.67
Total	32	16	8	8	42	32	+10	50.00

Updated to match played 21 July 2025
Source: Competitions

=== Super League Greece ===
==== Regular season ====
===== League table =====
Pos	Team	Pld	W	D	L	GF	GA	GD	Pts	Qualification or relegation
3	Panathinaikos	26	14	8	4	31	22	+9	50	Qualification for the Championship play-offs
4	PAOK	26	14	4	8	51	26	+25	46	Qualification for the Championship play-offs
5	Aris	26	12	6	8	31	28	+3	42	Qualification for the Europe play-offs
6	OFI	26	10	6	10	37	38	−1	36	Qualification for the Europe play-offs
7	Atromitos	26	10	5	11	32	32	0	35	Qualification for the Europe play-offs

Source: Super League Greece
Rules for classification: 1) Points; 2) Head-to-head points; 3) Head-to-head goal difference; 4) Goal difference; 5) Goals scored; 6) Play-offs (neutral ground).
(Note: Criterion 6 is only used if needed to decide champion, teams for relegation or teams for UEFA competitions).

===== Results summary =====
Overall								Home						Away					
Pld	W	D	L	GF	GA	GD	Pts	W	D	L	GF	GA	GD	W	D	L	GF	GA	GD
26	12	6	8	31	28	+3	42	8	3	2	17	8	+9	4	3	6	14	20	−6

Last updated: 9 March 2025.
Source: Super League Greece

===== Results by matchday =====
Matchday	1	2	3	4	5	6	7	8	9	10	11	12	13	14	15	16	17	18	19	20	21	22	23	24	25	26
Ground	A	A	H	A	H	A	H	H	A	H	A	H	A	H	H	A	H	A	H	A	A	H	A	H	A	H
Result	D	W	D	L	W	W	W	W	D	W	L	L	L	W	W	L	L	L	D	W	W	W	L	W	D	D
Position	6	5	4	5	6	4	2	1	1	1	3	5	5	5	5	5	5	5	6	6	6	5	5	5	5	5

Updated to match(es) played on 9 March 2025. Source: Super League Greece
A = Away; H = Home; W = Win; D = Draw; L = Loss; P = Postponed

===== Matches =====
18 August 2024 1	Atromitos	1 – 1	Aris Thessaloniki	Peristeri
20:30 EET	Mansur (yellow card) 35'; Ouédraogo (yellow card) 57'; Warda 74' (pen.)	Report	Martín Montoya (yellow card) 49'; Vélez (yellow card) 52'; Brorsson 66' (o.g.); Zamora (yellow card) 82'	Stadium: Peristeri Stadium; Attendance: 1,030; Referee: Alexandros Tsakalidis

24 August 2024 2	Panserraikos	0 – 1	Aris Thessaloniki	Serres
20:00 EET	Staikos (yellow card) 22'; Deletić (yellow card) 51'; Deligiannidis (yellow card) 72'; Bergström (yellow card) 80'	Report	García (yellow card) 18'; José Cifuentes 35'; Brabec (yellow card) 42'; Frýdek (yellow card) 64'; Sisto (yellow card) 72'; Hugo Mallo (yellow card) 90+3'; Monchu (yellow card) 90+6'	Stadium: Serres Municipal Stadium; Attendance: 2,910; Referee: Stavros Tsimenteridis

31 August 2024 3	Aris Thessaloniki	1 – 1	Asteras Tripolis	Thessaloniki
20:00 EET	Martin Frýdek (yellow card) 30'; Loren Morón 63'; Álvaro Zamora (yellow card) 87'; Martín Montoya (yellow card) 90+1'	Report	Nikos Kaltsas (yellow card) 66'; Francesc Regis 81'; Vasilios Mantzis (yellow card) 87' (yellow-red card) 88'	Stadium: Kleanthis Vikelidis Stadium; Referee: Ioannis Papadopoulos

15 September 2024 4	OFI	3 – 2	Aris Thessaloniki	Heraklion
20:30 EET	Thiago Nuss 21' (pen.), (yellow card) 27'; Filip Bainović (yellow card) 42'; Vasilios Lampropoulos 57'; Giannis Apostolakis (yellow card) 75'; Eddie Salcedo 82'	Report	Vladimír Darida (yellow card) 28'; Loren Morón 68' (pen.), (yellow card) 77', (goal) 88' (pen.)	Stadium: Theodoros Vardinogiannis Stadium; Attendance: 3.104; Referee: Anastasios Sidiropoulos

21 September 2024 5	Aris Thessaloniki	2 – 1	Olympiacos	Thessaloniki
19:30 EET	Manu García 3'; Hugo Mallo (yellow card) 31'; Fran Vélez (yellow card) 35'; Loren Morón 41'	Report	Andreas Ntoi (yellow card) 38'; David Carmo (yellow card) 57'; Sérgio Oliveira (yellow card) 75'; Santiago Hezze (yellow card) 87'; Ayoub El Kaabi 90+6'	Stadium: Kleanthis Vikelidis Stadium; Attendance: 7.222; Referee: Luca Pairetto (Italy)

29 September 2024 6	PAOK	0 – 1	Aris Thessaloniki	Thessaloniki
20:30 EET	Giannis Michailidis (yellow card) 20'; Baba Rahman (yellow card) 55'	Report	Fran Vélez (yellow card) 17'; Manu García (yellow card) 38', (goal) 63'; Julián Cuesta (yellow card) 82'	Stadium: Toumba Stadium; Attendance: 19.282; Referee: Harm Osmers (Germany)

5 October 2024 7	Aris Thessaloniki	2 – 0	Lamia	Thessaloniki
20:00 EEST	Loren Morón 4', 43'; Martín Montoya (yellow card) 85'	Report	Georgios Saramantas (yellow card) 28'; Sebastian Ring (yellow card) 55'; Léo Andrade (yellow card) 65'	Stadium: Kleanthis Vikelidis Stadium; Attendance: 6.530; Referee: Spyridon Zabalas

20 October 2024 8	Aris Thessaloniki	2 – 0	Athens Kallithea	Thessaloniki
20:00 EEST	Monchu Rodríguez (yellow card) 55'; Jakub Brabec 65'; Manu García 88'	Report	Triantafyllos Pasalidis (yellow card) 3' (yellow-red card) 34'; Nicolas Isimat-Mirin (yellow card) 12'; Javier Matilla (yellow card) 38'; Mor Ndiaye (yellow card) 90+2'	Stadium: Kleanthis Vikelidis Stadium; Attendance: 7.950; Referee: Petros Tsagarakis

27 October 2024 9	Panathinaikos	1 – 1	Aris Thessaloniki	Athens
18:00 EET	Tetê 33'; Filip Mladenović (yellow card) 51'; Willian Arão (yellow card) 89'	Report	Hugo Mallo (yellow card) 28'; Fran Vélez (yellow card) 50'; Loren Morón 72'; Jakub Brabec (yellow card) 79'	Stadium: Athens Olympic Stadium; Attendance: 18.702; Referee: Felix Zwayer (Germany)

3 November 2024 10	Aris Thessaloniki	3 – 1	Levadiakos	Thessaloniki
16:30 EEST	Shapi Suleymanov 9'; Monchu Rodríguez 33'; Fabiano Leismann (yellow card) 43'; Fran Vélez (yellow card) 46'; Loren Morón 63' (pen.); Lindsay Rose (yellow card) 85'	Report	Zini (yellow card) 25', (goal) 30'; Guillermo Balzi (yellow card) 38'; Panagiotis Symelidis (yellow card) 57'; Panagiotis Liagas (yellow card) 87'	Stadium: Kleanthis Vikelidis Stadium; Attendance: 11.395; Referee: Athanassios Tzilos

9 November 2024 11	Panetolikos	2 – 1	Aris Thessaloniki	Agrinio
17:00 EET	Epaminondas Pantelakis 17'; Facundo Pérez (yellow card) 48'; Georgios Liavas (yellow card) 64'; Christos Belevonis 90+10'	Report	Manu García 41'; Monchu Rodríguez (yellow card) 64'; Lindsay Rose (red card) 77'; Juankar Pérez (yellow card) 90+8'	Stadium: Panetolikos Stadium; Attendance: 2.087; Referee: Stavros Tsimenteridis

23 November 2024 12	Aris Thessaloniki	0 – 1	Volos NFC	Thessaloniki
19:30 EEST	Vladimír Darida (yellow card) 26'; Loren Morón (yellow card) 39'; José Cifuentes (yellow card) 90+4'	Report	Márk Koszta 36'; Lucas Villafáñez (yellow card) 52'; Nemanja Miletić (yellow card) 61'; Georgios Mygas (yellow card) 90'; Tasos Tsokanis (yellow card) 90+5'	Stadium: Kleanthis Vikelidis Stadium; Attendance: 12.303; Referee: Petros Tsagarakis

30 November 2024 13	AEK Athens	4 – 0	Aris Thessaloniki	Athens
20:30 EET	Harold Moukoudi 17'; Levi García (yellow card) 19', (goal) 58'; Anthony Martial 45' (pen.); Aboubakary Koïta (yellow card) 80'; Frantzdy Pierrot 89'	Report	Fran Vélez (yellow card) 15'; Martin Frýdek (yellow card) 33'; Hugo Mallo (yellow card) 77'	Stadium: Agia Sophia Stadium; Attendance: 22.505; Referee: Fabio Verissimo (Portugal)

7 December 2024 14	Aris Thessaloniki	2 – 1	Atromitos	Thessaloniki
19:30 EEST	Hugo Mallo 14'; Monchu Rodríguez (yellow card) 28'; Loren Morón 36' (pen.); Vladimír Darida (yellow card) 43'; Jean Jules (yellow card) 87'	Report	Makana Baku (yellow card) 33'; Amr Warda 53' (pen.); Mattheos Mountes (yellow card) 54'; Athanasios Karamanis (yellow card) 69'	Stadium: Kleanthis Vikelidis Stadium; Referee: Angelos Evangelou

15 December 2024 15	Aris Thessaloniki	1 – 0	Panserraikos	Thessaloniki
15:30 EEST	Manu García (yellow card) 32'; Shapi Suleymanov (yellow card) 40' (yellow-red card) 90+6'; Martin Frýdek (yellow card) 53'; Pione Sisto (yellow card) 71'; Álvaro Zamora 85'; Fabiano Leismann (yellow card) 90+6'	Report	Jérémy Gelin (yellow card) 34'; Mohamed Farès (yellow card) 52'; Miloš Deletić (yellow card) 68'; Panagiotis Deligiannidis (yellow card) 88'; Jason Davidson (yellow card) 90+5'	Stadium: Kleanthis Vikelidis Stadium; Referee: Fotios Polychronis

23 December 2024 16	Asteras Tripolis	2 – 1	Aris Thessaloniki	Tripoli
15:00 EET	Yevgeny Yablonsky 59'; Federico Macheda 76'; Nikolai Alho (yellow card) 90+1'	Report	Fabiano Leismann (yellow card) 10'; Monchu Rodríguez (yellow card) 18'; Álvaro Zamora 30'; Martín Montoya (yellow card) 52'	Stadium: Theodoros Kolokotronis Stadium; Attendance: 925; Referee: Alexandros Katsikogiannis

5 January 2025 17	Aris Thessaloniki	0 – 2	OFI	Thessaloniki
16:30 EET	Loren Morón (yellow card) 32'; Jakub Brabec (yellow card) 36'; Fabiano Leismann (yellow card) 56' (yellow-red card) 89'; Clayton Diandy (yellow card) 62'; Álvaro Zamora (red card) 79'	Report	Vasilios Lampropoulos (yellow card) 28'; Thiago Nuss (yellow card) 35'; Borja González 58'; Andrew Jung 70'; Giannis Theodosoulakis (yellow card) 90+6'	Stadium: Kleanthis Vikelidis Stadium; Attendance: 5.598; Referee: Andreas Gamaris

11 January 2025 18	Olympiacos	2 – 1	Aris Thessaloniki	Piraeus
20:30 EET	Kristoffer Velde (yellow card) 39'; Charalampos Kostoulas 50', 90+6'; Christos Mouzakitis (yellow card) 64'	Report	Loren Morón 35'; Martín Montoya (yellow card) 39' (yellow-red card) 72'; Kike Saverio (yellow card) 47'	Stadium: Karaiskakis Stadium; Attendance: 29.532; Referee: Glenn Nyberg (Sweden)

19 January 2025 19	Aris Thessaloniki	0 – 0	PAOK	Thessaloniki
19:00 EET	Álvaro Zamora (yellow card) 90+3'	Report	Tomasz Kędziora (yellow card) 90+1'	Stadium: Kleanthis Vikelidis; Attendance: 10.558; Referee: Sascha Stegeman (Germany)

26 January 2025 20	Lamia	0 – 2	Aris Thessaloniki	Lamia
17:00 EET	Vasilios Vitlis (yellow card) 58'; Gustavo Furtado (red card) 89'	Report	Hamza Mendyl (yellow card) 51'; Loren Morón (yellow card) 57', (goal) 66', 79'	Stadium: Lamia Municipal Stadium; Attendance: 1.466; Referee: Angelos Evangelou

2 February 2025 21	Athens Kallithea	0 – 1	Aris Thessaloniki	Athens
17:00 EET	Kenourgios (yellow card) 55'; Nicolas Isimat-Mirin (yellow card) 68'; James McGarry (yellow card) 90+4'; Mathieu Valbuena (yellow card) 90+5'	Report	Hamza Mendyl 22', (yellow card) 45'; José Cifuentes (yellow card) 77'; Álvaro Zamora (yellow card) 84'	Stadium: Apostolos Nikolaidis Stadium; Attendance: 1.279; Referee: Panagiotis Tsiaras

9 February 2025 22	Aris Thessaloniki	2 – 0	Panathinaikos	Thessaloniki
19:30 EET	Vladimír Darida (yellow card) 18'; Kike Saverio 43'; Loren Morón 50' (pen.); Martín Montoya (yellow card) 51'; Dario Špikić (yellow card) 64'	Report	Nemanja Maksimović (yellow card) 48'	Stadium: Kleanthis Vikelidis; Attendance: 8.740; Referee: Harm Osmers (Germany)

16 February 2025 23	Levadiakos	4 – 1	Aris Thessaloniki	Livadeia
15:00 EET	Triantafyllos Tsapras 21'; Joel Abu Hanna (yellow card) 43'; Rodrigo Erramuspe 51'; Panagiotis Symelidis 54'; Fabricio Pedrozo 79'	Report	Monchu Rodríguez (yellow card) 6'; Rodrigo Erramuspe 29' (o.g.)	Stadium: Levadia Municipal Stadium; Attendance: 1.535; Referee: Christos Vergetis

23 February 2025 24	Aris Thessaloniki	2 – 1	Panetolikos	Thessaloniki
16:30 EET	Loren Morón 13'; Monchu Rodríguez 30'; Jakub Brabec (yellow card) 49'	Report	Miguel Luís (yellow card) 28'; Sergio Díaz (yellow card) 58', (goal) 61'; Christos Sielis (yellow card) 90+1'	Stadium: Kleanthis Vikelidis; Attendance: 3.548; Referee: Anastasios Sidiropoulos

1 March 2025 25	Volos NFC	1 – 1	Aris Thessaloniki	Volos
17:00 EET	Georgios Mygas (yellow card) 32'; Hjörtur Hermannsson 71'; Pedro Conde (yellow card) 90+3'; Daniel Sundgren (yellow card) 90+7'	Report	Giannis Fetfatzidis (yellow card) 59'; Loren Morón 66' (pen.); Jakub Brabec (yellow card) 74'	Stadium: Panthessaliko Stadium; Attendance: 191; Referee: Ioannis Papadopoulos

9 March 2025 26	Aris Thessaloniki	0 – 0	AEK Athens	Thessaloniki
19:00 EET	Hugo Mallo (yellow card) 49'; Monchu Rodríguez (yellow card) 68'	Report	Erik Lamela (yellow card) 45+2'; Gerasimos Mitoglou (red card) 58'; Damian Szymański (yellow card) 62'; Robert Ljubičić (yellow card) 84'	Stadium: Kleanthis Vikelidis; Attendance: 5.281; Referee: Daniel Siebert (Germany)

==== Europe Play-offs ====
The teams ranked 5 through 8 from the regular season participated in the Europe play-offs to determine the last available spot for 2025–26 UEFA Conference League, which was awarded to the 5th placed team, as the cup winner was Olympiacos. The teams played each other twice (6 matches per team) and entered the round with half the points they earned during the regular season.

===== League table =====
Pos	Team	Pld	W	D	L	GF	GA	GD	Pts	Qualification
5	Aris Thessaloniki	32	16	8	8	42	32	+10	35	Possible Qualification for the Conference League second qualifying round
6	Asteras Tripolis	32	13	5	14	35	40	−5	27	
7	Atromitos	32	12	7	13	39	37	+2	26	
8	OFI	32	10	8	14	40	47	−7	20	

Updated to match(es) played on 13 April 2025. Source: Super League Greece
Rules for classification: 1) Points; 2) Head-to-head points (Regular season and play-off); 3) Head-to-head goal difference (Regular season and play-off); 4) Regular season position.

===== Results summary =====
Overall								Home						Away					
Pld	W	D	L	GF	GA	GD	Pts	W	D	L	GF	GA	GD	W	D	L	GF	GA	GD
32	16	8	8	42	32	+10	56	11	3	2	24	10	+14	5	5	6	18	22	−4

Last updated: 21 July 2025.
Source: Super League

===== Results by matchday =====
Matchday	1	2	3	4	5	6
Ground	A	H	H	A	A	H
Result	W	W	W	D	D	W
Position	5	5	5	5	5	5

Updated to match(es) played on 21 July 2025. Source: Super League
A = Away; H = Home; W = Win; D = Draw; L = Loss; P = Postponed

===== Matches =====
29 March 2025 1	Asteras Tripolis	0 – 2	Aris Thessaloniki	Tripoli
19:30 EET	Nikos Kaltsas (yellow card) 45+2'; Eder González (red card) 62'	Report	Jakub Brabec 37'; Loren Morón (yellow card) 47'; Kike Saverio 58', (yellow card) 74'; Dudu Rodrigues (yellow card) 78'; Martín Montoya (yellow card) 89'	Stadium: Theodoros Kolokotronis Stadium; Attendance: 1,603; Referee: Vassilios Fotias

5 April 2025 2	Aris Thessaloniki	2 – 0	OFI	Thessaloniki
19:30 EET	Loren Morón 62', 90+3'	Report	Thanasis Androutsos (yellow card) 16'	Stadium: Kleanthis Vikelidis; Attendance: 4,161; Referee: Alexandros Katsikogiannis

13 April 2025 3	Aris Thessaloniki	1 – 0	Atromitos	Thessaloniki
19:30 EET	Jakub Brabec 77'; José Cifuentes (yellow card) 83'	Report	Ismahila Ouédraogo (yellow card) 49'; Franz Brorsson (yellow card) 81'; Thanasis Karamanis (yellow card) 84'	Stadium: Kleanthis Vikelidis; Attendance: 5,807; Referee: Anastasios Sidiropoulos

26 April 2025 4	Atromitos	1 – 1	Aris Thessaloniki	Athens
20:00 EET	Quini (footballer, born 1989) (yellow card) 45+2'; Makana Baku 74'	Report	Loren Morón 45+1'; Monchu (yellow card) 53'; Vladimir Darida (yellow card) 58'; Ruben Pardo (yellow card) 90+5'	Stadium: Stadio Peristeriou; Attendance: 1,016; Referee: Alexandros Tsakalidis

3 May 2025 5	OFI	1 – 1	Aris Thessaloniki	Heraklion
20:00 EET	Vasilios Lampropoulos 6'; Thanasis Androutsos (yellow card) 31'; Eddie Salcedo (yellow card) 49'	Report	Mochu (yellow card) 31'; Jakub Brabec (yellow card) 38'; Hamza Mendyl (yellow card) 64'; Dario Špikić (yellow card) 84', (goal) 89'	Stadium: Theodoros Vardinogiannis Stadium; Attendance: 3,994; Referee: Athanasios Tzilos

10 May 2025 6	Aris Thessaloniki	4 – 2	Asteras Tripolis	Thessaloniki
18:00 EET	Dario Špikić 12'; Monchu 23'; Jakub Brabec (yellow card) 44'; Dudu 56', 77'	Report	Jakub Brabec 72' (o.g.); Okoh Chidera 89'	Stadium: Kleanthis Vikelidis; Attendance: 5,110; Referee: Fotis Polychronis

=== Greek Cup ===
Aris Thessaloniki finished in 5th place in the Super League 1 the previous season, which meant that the team entered in the Fourth Round. The draw was held on 17 September 2024 and the games were single-legged.

==== Fourth round ====
25 September 2024 Fourth round	Ethnikos Piraeus	0 – 1	Aris Thessaloniki	Athens
15:00 EET		Report	Vladimír Darida 31'	Stadium: Grigoris Lamprakis Stadium; Referee: Konstantinos Katikos

==== Round of 16 ====
The Round of 16 draw took place on 2 October 2024 and Aris Thessaloniki were drawn against AEK Athens.

Each tie in the knockout phase, apart from the final, was played over two legs. The away goals rule was not applied.

30 October 2024 First leg	AEK Athens	1 – 0	Aris Thessaloniki	Athens
19:30 EET	Alberto Brignoli (yellow card) 33'; Anthony Martial 45+1'; Mijat Gaćinović (yellow card) 81'; Erik Lamela (yellow card) 90+4'	Report	Monchu Rodríguez (yellow card) 57'	Stadium: Agia Sophia Stadium; Referee: Anastasios Sidiropoulos

3 December 2024 Second leg	Aris Thessaloniki	1 – 1 (1–2 agg.)	AEK Athens	Thessaloniki
19:30 EET	Loren Morón 45+2'	Report	Anthony Martial 80'	Stadium: Kleanthis Vikelidis; Referee: Vasilios Fotias

== Squad statistics ==
=== Goals ===
As of match played 26 April 2025

Ranking	Pos.	Nat.	Player	SL 1	GC	Total
1	FW	(Spain)	Loren Morón	18	1	19
2	FW	(Spain)	Manu García	4	0	4
3	DF	(Czech Republic)	Jakub Brabec	3	0	3
4	MF	(Spain)	Monchu Rodríguez	2	0	2
4	FW	(Ecuador) / (Spain)	Kike Saverio	2	0	2
4	FW	(Costa Rica)	Álvaro Zamora	2	0	2
7	MF	(Ecuador)	José Cifuentes	1	0	1
7	FW	(Russia)	Shapi Suleymanov	1	0	1
7	DF	(Spain)	Hugo Mallo	1	0	1
7	DF	(Morocco) / (Ivory Coast)	Hamza Mendyl	1	0	1
7	MF	(Czech Republic)	Vladimír Darida	0	1	1
Own Goals				2	0	2
Total				36	2	38

=== Clean Sheets ===
As of match played 26 April 2025

#	Nat.	Player	SL 1	GC	Total
23	(Spain)	Julián Cuesta	13	1	14
Total			13	1	14

== Players' awards ==
=== Best Goal (Super League 1) ===
Matchday	Nat.	Player	Ref
Regular Season
2nd	(Ecuador)	José Cifuentes	
5th	(Spain)	Manu García	
6th	(Spain)	Manu García	
9th	(Spain)	Loren Morón	

=== Player of the Month (Super League 1) ===
Month	Nat.	Player	Ref
September	(Spain)	Manu García	
October	(Spain)	Loren Morón	
February	(Spain)	Loren Morón	
