= Gning =

Gning is a surname. Notable people with the surname include:

- Abdallah Gning (born 1998), Senegalese football forward
- Mamadou Gning (born 2006), Senegalese football midfielder
- Mouhamadou Gning (born 1989), Senegalese football midfielder
