= Abdulhadi Nuaman =

Qatari footballer (born 1996)

Personal information
- Full name: Abdulhadi Nuaman Ameen Faheed
- Date of birth: 21 August 1996 (age 30)
- Place of birth: Qatar
- Position: Midfielder

Team information
- Current team: Al Bidda
- Number: 11

Youth career
- Al-Kharaitiyat

Senior career*
Years	Team	Apps	(Gls)
2015–2022	Al-Kharaitiyat	37	(5)
2015–2016	→ Al-Sadd (loan)	0	(0)
2022–2023	Al-Markhiya	5	(0)
2023–	Al Bidda	1	(0)
- * Club domestic league appearances and goals

Abdulhadi Nuaman (Arabic:عبد الهادي نعمان) (born 21 August 1996) is a Qatari footballer who plays for Al Bidda as a midfielder.
