= Mohammad Jumaa =

Omani footballer (born 1986)

Personal information
- Full name: Mohammad Jumaa Al-Alawi
- Date of birth: 24 June 1986 (age 40)
- Place of birth: Oman
- Position: Left-back

Senior career*
| Years | Team | Apps | (Gls) |
| 2004–2011 | Al-Shamal | | |
| 2011–2017 | El Jaish | 1 | (0) |
| 2012–2015 | → Al-Khor (loan) | 83 | (3) |
| 2015–2016 | → Al-Rayyan (loan) | 22 | (3) |
| 2016–2017 | → Al Arabi (loan) | 17 | (1) |
| 2017 | → Al-Sailiya (loan) | 6 | (0) |
| 2017–2023 | Al-Rayyan | 88 | (1) |
| 2020 | → Al-Khor (loan) | 2 | (0) |
| 2023–2025 | Mesaimeer | | |
- * Club domestic league appearances and goals

Mohammad Jumaa Al-Alawi (Arabic:محمد جمعة العلوي) (born 24 June 1986) is an Omani footballer who currently plays as a left back.
