= Musaab Abdulmajeed =

Qatari footballer (born 1993)

Personal information
- Full name: Musaab Abdulmajeed Abdullah
- Date of birth: 9 February 1993 (age 33)
- Place of birth: Qatar
- Position: Midfielder

Team information
- Current team: Mesaimeer
- Number: 23

Youth career
- Al-Khor

Senior career*
Years	Team	Apps	(Gls)
2012–2024	Al-Khor	116	(2)
2024–	Mesaimeer	0	(0)
- * Club domestic league appearances and goals

Musaab Abdulmajeed (Arabic: مصعب عبد المجيد; born 9 February 1993) is a Qatari footballer who plays for Mesaimeeras a midfielder.
