= Abdullah Al-Deyani =

Qatari footballer (born 1986)

Personal information
- Full name: Abdullah Ali Al-Deyani
- Date of birth: 26 May 1986 (age 40)
- Place of birth: Qatar
- Position: Winger

Youth career
- Mesaimeer

Senior career*
Years	Team	Apps	(Gls)
2004–2010	Al-Wakra		
2008–2009	→ Al-Gharafa (loan)		
2010–2017	Qatar SC		
2018–2021	Mesaimeer		
- * Club domestic league appearances and goals

Abdullah Al-Deyani (Arabic:عبد الله الدياني) (born 26 May 1986) is a Qatari footballer.
