= Mohammed Al-Rabiei =

Qatari footballer (born 1990)

Personal information
- Full name: Mohammed Salim Mesbah Al-Rabiei
- Date of birth: 29 April 1990 (age 36)
- Place of birth: Qatar
- Height: 1.78 m (5 ft 10 in)
- Position: Defender

Youth career
- Qatar SC

Senior career*
Years	Team	Apps	(Gls)
2011–2024	Qatar	137	(4)
2024–2025	Mesaimeer	4	(0)
2025	Al-Shamal	2	(0)
- * Club domestic league appearances and goals

Mohammed Al-Rabiei (Arabic: محمد الربيعي) (born 29 April 1990) is a Qatari footballer. He currently plays as a defender.
