= Othman Al-Aqib =

Qatari footballer (born 1991)

Personal information
- Full name: Othman Hassan Al-Aqib
- Date of birth: 17 January 1991 (age 35)
- Place of birth: Qatar
- Position: Left-back

Senior career*
Years	Team	Apps	(Gls)
2010–2020	Al-Sailiya	73	(0)
2020–2021	Mesaimeer		
- * Club domestic league appearances and goals

Othman Al-Aqib (Arabic:عثمان العاقب) (born 17 January 1991) is a Qatari footballer who plays as a left back. For much of his career, he has played for the Qatari club Al-Sailiya.
