= 2017–18 Qatari Stars Cup =

Tournament details
- Country: Qatar
- Dates: 3 October – 19 December 2017
- Teams: 12

Final positions
- Champions: Al-Gharafa (2nd title)
- Runners-up: Al-Rayyan

Tournament statistics
- Matches played: 33
- Goals scored: 126 (3.82 per match)

The 2017 Qatari Stars Cup was the seventh edition of Qatari Stars Cup.

The tournament featured 12 teams divided into 2 groups. The draw for the group took place on 8 September 2017 at the headquarters in Al Bidda.

== Round One Groups ==
Group A	Group B
Al-Gharafa; Al-Sailiya; Qatar SC; Al-kharaitiyat; Al-Khor; Al-Duhail	Al-Sadd; Al-Arabi; Al-Rayyan; Umm-Salal; Al-Markhiya Sports Club; Al-Ahli

=== Standings ===
==== Group A ====
Pos	Team	Pld	W	D	L	GF	GA	GD	Pts
1	Al-Gharafa	5	4	1	0	10	3	+7	13
2	Al Kharitiyath	5	3	2	0	18	9	+9	11
3	Al-Duhail	5	2	1	2	16	11	+5	7
4	Qatar SC	5	1	2	2	10	13	−3	5
5	Al-Khor	5	1	1	3	5	15	−10	4
6	Al-Sailiya	5	0	1	4	6	14	−8	1

Source: soccerway.com
Rules for classification: 1) points; 2) goal difference; 3) number of goals scored.

===== Results =====
Date	Team 1	Score	Team 2
2017/10/03	Al-Duhail	2–5	Qatar SC
2017/10/03	Al-Khor	1–2	Al-Gharafa
2017/10/03	Al-Sailiya	1–3	Al-Kharitiyath
2017/10/08	Al-Kharitiyath	2–4	Al-Khor
2017/10/08	Al-Duhail	0–1	Al-Gharafa
2017/10/08	Qatar SC	3–3	Al-Sailiya
2017/11/08	Al-Sailiya	1–2	Al-Khor
2017/11/08	Al-Gharafa	2–1	Qatar SC
2017/11/08	Al-Kharitiyath	4–4	Al-Duhail
2017/11/13	Al-Gharafa	1–1	Al-Kharitiyath
2017/11/13	Qatar SC	0–0	Al-Khor
2017/11/13	Al-Duhail	2–1	Al-Sailiya
2017/12/11	Al-Khor	0–8	Al-Duhail
2017/12/11	Al-Kharitiyath	6–1	Qatar SC
2017/12/11	Al-Sailiya	0–4	Al-Gharafa

==== Group B ====
Pos	Team	Pld	W	D	L	GF	GA	GD	Pts
1	Al-Rayyan	5	4	1	0	13	3	+10	13
2	Umm-Salal	5	2	2	1	8	5	+3	8
3	Al-Ahli	5	2	2	1	8	8	0	8
4	Al-Arabi	5	1	3	1	10	10	0	6
5	Al-Markhiya Sports Club	5	1	2	2	6	10	−4	5
6	Al-Sadd	5	0	0	5	8	17	−9	0

Source: soccerway.com
Rules for classification: 1) points; 2) goal difference; 3) number of goals scored.

===== Results =====
Date	Team 1	Score	Team 2
2017/10/04	Al-Sadd	0–2	Al-Markhiya Sports Club
2017/10/04	Al Arabi	1–1	Umm-Salal
2017/10/04	Al-Rayyan	2–0	Al-Ahli
2017/10/09	Al-Ahli	2–2	Umm-Salal
2017/10/09	Al Arabi	2–2	Al-Markhiya Sports Club
2017/10/09	Al-Rayyan	5–1	Al-Sadd
2017/11/07	Al-Rayyan	5–2	Al-Markhiya Sports Club
2017/11/07	Al Arabi	2–3	Al-Ahli
2017/11/07	Umm-Salal	2–1	Al-Sadd
2017/11/12	Al-Rayyan	1–0	Umm-Salal
2017/11/12	Al-Sadd	4–5	Al Arabi
2017/11/12	Al-Markhiya Sports Club	2–1	Al-Ahli
2017/12/12	Al Arabi	0–0	Al-Rayyan
2017/12/12	Al-Ahli	3–2	Al-Sadd
2017/12/12	Umm-Salal	3–0	Al-Markhiya Sports Club

== Knockout round ==
=== Semi-finals ===
16 December 2017
18:00 AST (UTC+3)

Al-Gharafa	1–0	Umm Salal
Adi 80'	Report

Al Wakrah Stadium, Al Wakrah

16 December 2017
20:30 AST (UTC+3)

Al-Rayyan	2–0	Al-Kharitiyath
Soria 16'; Goumou 72'	Report

Al-Shamal Stadium, Al Shamal

== Final ==
19 December 2017
21:00 AST (UTC+3)

Al-Gharafa	3–2	Al-Rayyan
Jiménez 3'; Seraj 36'; Alaaeldin 64'	Report	Hamdallah 12'; Kasola 70'

Suheim bin Hamad Stadium, Doha
