= Khaled Nawaf =

Qatari footballer (born 1989)

Personal information
- Full name: Khaled Nawaf Al-Quraini
- Date of birth: 27 March 1989 (age 37)
- Place of birth: Qatar
- Position: Defender

Senior career*
Years	Team	Apps	(Gls)
2009–2014	Al-Sailiya	47	(0)
2014–2017	Al Arabi	12	(0)
2017–2018	Al-Khor	10	(1)
2018–2019	Al-Kharaitiyat	3	(0)
2018–2019	→ Al-Shamal (loan)		
2019–2023	Lusail		
- * Club domestic league appearances and goals

Khaled Nawaf (Arabic: خالد نواف) (born 27 March 1989) is a Qatari footballer. He currently plays as a defender.
