= Tariq Hamed =

Egyptian footballer (born 1995)

Tariq Hamed طارق حامد
Personal information
- Full name: Tariq Hamed Abdulmajeed
- Date of birth: 11 June 1995 (age 31)
- Place of birth: Egypt
- Position: Midfielder

Team information
- Current team: Al Bidda
- Number: 50

Youth career
- Al-Gharafa

Senior career*
Years	Team	Apps	(Gls)
2013–2016	Al-Gharafa		
2015–2016	→ Muaither (loan)		
2016–2017	Al-Markhiya		
2017–2019	Al-Arabi		
2019–2021	Lusail		
2021–2023	Al Bidda		
2024–	Al Bidda		
- * Club domestic league appearances and goals

Tariq Hamed Abdulmajeed (Arabic:طارق حامد عبد المجيد; born 11 June 1995) is an Egyptian footballer who plays for Al Bidda as a midfielder.

== Career ==
He formerly played for Al-Gharafa, Muaither, Al-Markhiya, Al-Arabi,Lusail and Al Bidda.
