= Muntasser =

Muntasser or al-Muntasir is a surname. Notable people with the surname include:

- Jehad Muntasser (born 1978), Libyan footballer
- Mohammad Muntasser (born 1989), Qatari footballer
- Mahmud al-Muntasir (1903–1970), Libyan politician and statesman
