= Filip Sidklev =

Swedish footballer (born 2005)

Personal information
- Full name: Carl Filip Sidklev
- Date of birth: 12 March 2005 (age 21)
- Place of birth: Stockholm, Sweden
- Height: 1.90 m (6 ft 3 in)
- Position: Goalkeeper

Team information
- Current team: Al Bidda
- Number: 1

Youth career
- 2018–2022: Brommapojkarna

Senior career*
Years	Team	Apps	(Gls)
2023–2024	Brommapojkarna	34	(0)
2024–2025	Aris	2	(0)
2025–	Al Bidda	0	(0)

International career^{‡}
2021–2022	Sweden U17	2	(0)
2022–2024	Sweden U19	5	(0)
2024	Sweden U21	2	(0)
- * Club domestic league appearances and goals as of 12 August 2025 ‡ National team caps and goals as of 17:53, 18 November 2024 (UTC)

Carl Filip Sidklev (born 12 March 2005) is a Swedish professional footballer who plays as a goalkeeper for Qatari Second Division club Al Bidda.

== Career ==
Sidklev hails from Lidingö. He came through the youth ranks at Brommapojkarna, which he joined at age 13, and was intended as the reserve to Oscar Linnér in the 2023 Allsvenskan. When Linnér was injured, Sidklev immediately established himself as the new first choice. In May 2023, he was praised for already having kept four clean sheets. He signed a new contract until 2026, while Oscar Linnér left the club because Brommapojkarna would no longer play him. In June 2023, Sidklev was ranked as Sweden's number four on the Golden Boy award's top 100 talent list, only behind Hugo Larsson, Johan Bångsbo and Noah Persson.

=== Aris ===
On 10 August 2024, Sidklev joined Aris on a five-year contract. The Greek side paid Brommapojkarna a fee around €600,000.

== Career statistics ==
As of match played 25 May 2025

Club	Season	League			National cup		Continental		Other		Total	
Club	Season	Division	Apps	Goals	Apps	Goals	Apps	Goals	Apps	Goals	Apps	Goals
Brommapojkarna	2022	Allsvenskan	0	0	3	0	—		—		3	0
Brommapojkarna	2023	Allsvenskan	22	0	4	0	—		—		26	0
Brommapojkarna	2024	Allsvenskan	12	0	0	0	—		—		12	0
Brommapojkarna	Total		34	0	7	0	—		—		41	0
Aris	2024–25	Superleague Greece	2	0	0	0	—		—		2	0
Career total			36	0	7	0	0	0	0	0	36	0
