= Zahir Belounis =

French-Algerian football player (born 1980)

Personal information
- Full name: Zahir Belounis
- Date of birth: February 15, 1980 (age 46)
- Place of birth: Saint-Maur-des-Fossés, France
- Height: 1.80 m (5 ft 11 in)
- Position: Striker

Senior career*
Years	Team	Apps	(Gls)
–2001	Olympique Noisy-le-Sec		
2001–2003	FAIRM Île-Rousse Monticello		
2003–2004	Saint-Lô Manche		
2005	Melaka TMFC		
2005–2007	La Tour/Le Pâquier		
2007–2013	El Jaish		
2011–2012	→ Al-Markhiya		
- * Club domestic league appearances and goals

Zahir Belounis (born 15 February 1980) is a French-Algerian football player who plays as a striker. The refusal of authorities in Qatar, where he was playing football, to grant him an exit visa after a pay dispute, brought him to wider attention.

== Career ==
Belounis played as a striker for lower league French and Swiss clubs before moving to Qatar in 2007. He played for the El Jaish SC.

He was in a dispute over unpaid wages from 2010 but because in Qatar, the employer has control over exit visas under the Kafala system, he was unable to leave the country. Belounis threatened to go on hunger strike to draw attention to his cause and in 2013, he wrote an open letter to 2022 World Cup ambassadors Zinedine Zidane and Pep Guardiola to garner support. FIFA declined to take up his case as Belounis had appealed via the Qatari authorities and not through FIFA.

After 19 months he was granted an exit visa and left Qatar to return to France. Belounis admitted that during his time awaiting an exit visa he had planned to leave Qatar illegally, considered suicide and had turned to alcohol to help him cope with his situation.

The case drew attention to Qatari employment laws and their interaction with their hosting of the 2022 World Cup.
