= 2020–21 Qatari Stars Cup =

Tournament details
- Country: Qatar
- Dates: 25 September 2020 – 26 March 2021
- Teams: 12

Final positions
- Champions: Al-Sailiya SC (1st title)
- Runners-up: Al-Rayyan SC

Tournament statistics
- Matches played: 37
- Goals scored: 115 (3.11 per match)

The 2020 Qatari Stars Cup was the tenth edition of Qatari Stars Cup.

The tournament featured 12 teams divided into 2 groups.

== Round One Groups ==
| Group A | Group B |
|---|---|
| Al-Wakrah SC; Al-Khor SC; Al-Sailiya SC; Al Sadd SC; Qatar SC; Al-Duhail SC | Al-Gharafa SC; Al-Arabi SC; Al-Rayyan SC; Al-Kharaitiyat SC; Umm Salal SC; Al Ahli SC |

=== Standings ===
==== Group A ====
| Pos | Team | Pld | W | D | L | GF | GA | GD | Pts |
|---|---|---|---|---|---|---|---|---|---|
| 1 | Al-Wakrah SC | 5 | 3 | 2 | 0 | 13 | 5 | +8 | 11 |
| 2 | Al-Khor SC | 5 | 3 | 0 | 2 | 14 | 4 | +10 | 9 |
| 3 | Al-Sailiya SC | 5 | 2 | 2 | 1 | 11 | 12 | −1 | 8 |
| 4 | Al Sadd SC | 5 | 2 | 1 | 2 | 10 | 12 | −2 | 7 |
| 5 | Qatar SC | 5 | 1 | 1 | 3 | 4 | 7 | −3 | 4 |
| 6 | Al-Duhail SC | 5 | 1 | 0 | 4 | 3 | 15 | −12 | 3 |

Source: soccerway.com
Rules for classification: 1) points; 2) goal difference; 3) number of goals scored.

===== Results =====
| Date | Team 1 | Score | Team 2 |
|---|---|---|---|
| 2020/09/26 | Al-Sailiya SC | 1–5 | Al-Khor SC |
| 2020/09/26 | Al-Wakrah SC | 1–1 | Qatar SC |
| 2020/10/06 | Al-Duhail SC | 1–3 | Al-Sailiya SC |
| 2020/10/06 | Al-Khor SC | 1–2 | Al-Wakrah SC |
| 2020/10/06 | Al Sadd SC | 2–3 | Qatar SC |
| 2020/10/13 | Al-Wakrah SC | 3–1 | Al-Duhail SC |
| 2020/10/13 | Al-Sailiya SC | 4–4 | Al Sadd SC |
| 2020/10/13 | Qatar SC | 0–2 | Al-Khor SC |
| 2020/11/04 | Al-Duhail SC | 1–0 | Qatar SC |
| 2020/11/04 | Al-Sailiya SC | 2–2 | Al-Wakrah SC |
| 2020/11/04 | Al Sadd SC | 1–0 | Al-Khor SC |
| 2020/11/07 | Al-Duhail SC | 0–3 | Al Sadd SC |
| 2020/11/10 | Al-Wakrah SC | 5–0 | Al Sadd SC |
| 2020/11/10 | Qatar SC | 0–1 | Al-Sailiya SC |
| 2020/11/10 | Al-Khor SC | 6–0 | Al-Duhail SC |

==== Group B ====
| Pos | Team | Pld | W | D | L | GF | GA | GD | Pts |
|---|---|---|---|---|---|---|---|---|---|
| 1 | Al-Gharafa SC | 5 | 4 | 1 | 0 | 10 | 1 | +9 | 13 |
| 2 | Al-Arabi SC | 5 | 3 | 2 | 0 | 11 | 3 | +8 | 11 |
| 3 | Al-Rayyan SC | 5 | 2 | 1 | 2 | 6 | 7 | −1 | 7 |
| 4 | Al Kharaitiyat SC | 5 | 2 | 0 | 3 | 9 | 8 | +1 | 6 |
| 5 | Umm Salal SC | 5 | 1 | 1 | 3 | 3 | 9 | −6 | 4 |
| 6 | Al Ahli SC | 5 | 0 | 1 | 4 | 2 | 13 | −11 | 1 |

Source: soccerway.com
Rules for classification: 1) points; 2) goal difference; 3) number of goals scored.

===== Results =====
| Date | Team 1 | Score | Team 2 |
|---|---|---|---|
| 2020/09/25 | Al-Rayyan SC | 1–4 | Al Kharaitiyat SC |
| 2020/09/25 | Al-Arabi SC | 5–1 | Al Ahli SC |
| 2020/09/25 | Al-Gharafa SC | 2–0 | Umm Salal SC |
| 2020/10/05 | Al Kharaitiyat SC | 2–0 | Al Ahli SC |
| 2020/10/05 | Umm Salal SC | 0–3 | Al-Arabi SC |
| 2020/10/05 | Al-Rayyan SC | 0–2 | Al-Gharafa SC |
| 2020/10/14 | Al Ahli SC | 1–1 | Umm Salal SC |
| 2020/10/14 | Al-Arabi SC | 0–0 | Al-Rayyan SC |
| 2020/10/14 | Al-Gharafa SC | 3–1 | Al Kharaitiyat SC |
| 2020/11/03 | Al-Rayyan SC | 2–0 | Al Ahli SC |
| 2020/11/03 | Al Kharaitiyat SC | 1–2 | Umm Salal SC |
| 2020/11/03 | Al-Gharafa SC | 0–0 | Al-Arabi SC |
| 2020/11/09 | Al-Arabi SC | 2–1 | Al Kharaitiyat SC |
| 2020/11/09 | Umm Salal SC | 0–2 | Al-Rayyan SC |
| 2020/11/09 | Al Ahli SC | 0–3 | Al-Gharafa SC |

== Knockout round ==
=== Quarter-finals ===
15 November 2020
14:15 AST (UTC+3)

| Al-Wakrah SC | 1–1 | Al Kharaitiyat SC |
|---|---|---|
| Mohamed Benyettou 9' | Report | Daniel Goumou 70' |

Grand Hamad Stadium, Al-Arabi SC

15 November 2020
16:30 AST (UTC+3)

| Al-Arabi SC | 2–2 | Al-Sailiya SC |
|---|---|---|
| Abdulaziz Al-Ansari 24'; Ibrahim Kala 33' | Report | Ahmad Hamoudan 78'; Abdulgadir Ilyas Bakur 86' |

Suheim bin Hamad Stadium, Qatar SC

16 November 2020
14:15 AST (UTC+3)

| Al-Gharafa SC | 4–2 | Al Sadd SC |
|---|---|---|
| Sofiane Hanni 27', 83'; Koo Ja-Cheol 47'; Othman Al-Yahri 87' | Report | Rodrigo Tabata 52'; Santi Cazorla 74' |

Suheim bin Hamad Stadium, Qatar SC

16 November 2020
16:35 AST (UTC+3)

| Al-Khor SC | 0–1 | Al-Rayyan SC |
|---|---|---|
| | Report | Abdurahman Al-Harazi 43' |

Grand Hamad Stadium, Al-Arabi SC

=== Semi-finals ===
20 March 2021
14:00 AST (UTC+3)

| Al-Wakrah SC | 0–3 | Al-Sailiya SC |
|---|---|---|
| | Report |

Jassim bin Hamad Stadium, Al Sadd SC
21 March 2021
14:00 AST (UTC+3)

| Al-Gharafa SC | 0–3 | Al-Rayyan SC |
|---|---|---|
| | Report | Yohan Boli 18', 36'; Mohammad Jumaa 57' |

Jassim bin Hamad Stadium, Al Sadd SC

== Final ==
26 March 2021
14:00 AST (UTC+3)

| Al-Sailiya SC | 2–0 | Al-Rayyan SC |
|---|---|---|
| Kara Mbodji 45+2'; Mohanad Ali 90' | Report |

Jassim bin Hamad Stadium, Al Sadd SC
