= Tiago Geralnik =

Argentine footballer

Personal information
- Full name: Tiago José Geralnik
- Date of birth: 31 March 2003 (age 23)
- Place of birth: Rosario, Argentina
- Height: 1.78 m (5 ft 10 in)
- Position: Attacking midfielder

Team information
- Current team: Lusail
- Number: 22

Youth career
- ADIUR
- 2018–2020: River Plate
- 2020–2021: Villarreal

Senior career*
Years	Team	Apps	(Gls)
2021–2022	Villarreal C	29	(6)
2022–2025	Villarreal B	67	(4)
2025–	Lusail	0	(0)

International career^{‡}
2019	Argentina U16	7	(1)
2022–	Argentina U20	3	(0)
- * Club domestic league appearances and goals as of 10 June 2025 ‡ National team caps and goals as of 10 June 2022

Tiago José Geralnik (born 31 March 2003) is an Argentine footballer who plays as an attacking midfielder for Lusail.

== Club career ==
Born in Rosario, Santa Fe Province, Geralnik joined River Plate's youth setup in January 2018, from Asociación Deportiva Infantil Unión Rosario (ADIUR). On 16 January 2020, aged just 16, he moved abroad and joined Spanish club Villarreal CF.

Geralnik made his senior debut with the C-team on 5 September 2021, coming on as a late substitute in a 1–0 Tercera División RFEF away win over Callosa Deportiva CF. He scored his first goal fourteen days later, netting the opener in a 2–1 away loss against Silla CF, and finished the season with six goals in 29 appearances; he also featured in 29 minutes with the reserves in a 2–1 loss at Algeciras CF.

Ahead of the 2022–23 campaign, Geralnik was definitely promoted to the B-team in Segunda División. He made his professional debut on 24 September, replacing Rodri late into a 1–1 away draw against Málaga CF.

On 17 January 2023, Geralnik renewed his contract with the Yellow Submarine until 2026.

On 18 August 2025, Geralnik moved to Qatari Second Division side Lusail SC on a permanent contract.

== International career ==
Geralnik represented Argentina at under-16 and under-20 levels before being called up to the full side by manager Lionel Scaloni for the remaining 2022 FIFA World Cup qualifiers against Venezuela and Ecuador.

== Personal life ==
Geralnik was born in Argentina and is of Italian descent, holding dual citizenship.
