= Monchu =

Spanish footballer (born 1999)

Personal information
- Full name: Ramón Rodríguez Jiménez
- Date of birth: 13 September 1999 (age 27)
- Place of birth: Palma, Spain
- Height: 1.70 m (5 ft 7 in)
- Position: Midfielder

Team information
- Current team: Juárez (on loan from Aris)
- Number: 6

Youth career
- 2007–2012: Mallorca
- 2012–2018: Barcelona

Senior career*
Years	Team	Apps	(Gls)
2017–2020	Barcelona B	63	(11)
2020–2021	Barcelona	1	(0)
2020–2021	→ Girona (loan)	39	(3)
2021–2022	Granada	14	(0)
2022	→ Valladolid (loan)	18	(2)
2022–2024	Valladolid	75	(9)
2024–	Aris	48	(4)
2026–	→ Juárez (loan)	2	(0)
- * Club domestic league appearances and goals as of 27 February 2026

Ramón Rodríguez Jiménez (born 13 September 1999), commonly known as Monchu, is a Spanish professional footballer who plays as a midfielder for Liga MX club Juárez, on loan from Super League Greece club Aris.

== Career ==
=== Barcelona ===
Born in Palma, Majorca, Balearic Islands, Monchu joined FC Barcelona's youth setup in 2012, from RCD Mallorca. After progressing through the youth setup, he made his senior debut with the reserves on 15 December 2017, coming on as a second-half substitute for Oriol Busquets in a 3–1 away loss against Cádiz CF in the Segunda División.

Monchu made his first team debut on 8 August 2020, coming off the bench in the UEFA Champions League round of 16 second leg against SSC Napoli.

==== Loan to Girona ====
On 22 September 2020, Monchu joined Girona FC in the second division on loan for the season, with a buyout clause. He scored his first goal for Girona the following 18 October in a 1–0 home victory against Real Oviedo.

=== Granada ===
On 16 July 2021, Granada CF announced the singing of Monchu from Barcelona on a free transfer, with Barça reserving a right to 50% of any future sale and a buy-back option. He made his top tier debut on 16 August, starting in a 0–0 away draw against Villarreal CF.

==== Loan to Valladolid ====
On 1 February 2022, Monchu was loaned to Real Valladolid in the second division, for the remainder of the season.

=== Aris ===
On 3 August 2024, Monchu became the most expensive arrival of Aris, with whom he signed a contract running until the summer of 2029. The Spanish midfielder will receive around €800,000 per year, whereas additional bonused have also been predicted.

==== Loan to Juarez ====
On 6 February 2026, Monchu joined Liga MX side FC Juárez on a one-year loan with an option to buy.

== Career statistics ==
As of match played on 27 February 2026

Appearances and goals by club, season and competition
Club	Season	League			Cup		Continental		Other		Total	
Club	Season	Division	Apps	Goals	Apps	Goals	Apps	Goals	Apps	Goals	Apps	Goals
Barcelona B	2017–18	Segunda División	6	1	—		—		—		6	1
Barcelona B	2018–19	Segunda División B	31	2	—		—		—		31	2
Barcelona B	2019–20	Segunda División B	26	8	—		—		3 (Note: 3 appearances in Segunda División B play-offs)	2	29	10
Barcelona B	Total		63	11	0	0	—		3	2	66	13
Barcelona	2019–20	La Liga	0	0	0	0	1 (Note: Appearance (s) in UEFA Champions League)	0	0	0	1	0
Girona (loan)	2020–21	Segunda División	39	3	0	0	—		4 (Note: 4 appearances in Segunda División play-offs)	0	43	3
Granada	2021–22	La Liga	14	0	2	0	—		—		16	0
Real Valladolid (loan)	2021–22	Segunda División	15	2	0	0	—		—		15	2
Real Valladolid	2022–23	La Liga	33	3	2	0	—		—		35	3
Real Valladolid	2023–24	Segunda División	42	6	0	0	—		—		42	6
Real Valladolid	Total		75	9	2	0	—		—		77	9
Aris	2024–25	Superleague Greece	30	3	3	0	—		—		33	3
Aris	2025–26	Superleague Greece	18	1	6	0	2 (Note: Appearance (s) in UEFA Conference League)	1	—		26	2
Aris	Total		48	4	9	0	2	1	—		59	5
Juárez	2025–26	Liga MX	2	0	0	0	—		—		2	0
Career total			256	29	13	0	3	1	7	2	279	32

== Honours ==
Barcelona

- UEFA Youth League: 2017–18

Individual

- Segunda División Player of the Month: April 2024
