= Pedro Fidel =

Spanish footballer (born 2004)

Personal information
- Full name: Pedro Fidel Cedillo Segura
- Date of birth: 18 June 2007 (age 19)
- Place of birth: Cartagena, Spain
- Height: 1.92 m (6 ft 4 in)
- Position: Centre-back

Team information
- Current team: Al-Waab

Youth career
- Elche
- 2023–2024: Sporting Atlético
- 2024–2025: Almería

Senior career*
Years	Team	Apps	(Gls)
2025–2026	Almería B	23	(0)
2025–2026	Almería	4	(0)
2026–	Al-Waab	0	(0)
- * Club domestic league appearances and goals as of 16 May 2026

Pedro Fidel Cedillo Segura (born 18 June 2007), known as Pedro Fidel, is a Spanish professional footballer who plays as a centre-back for Qatari club Al-Waab SC.

== Career ==
Born in Cartagena, Murcia to an Ecuadorian father and a Spanish mother, Pedro Fidel played for Elche CF and Sporting Atlético de Ceuta as a youth before joining UD Almería's Juvenil squad in January 2024. He made his senior debut with the reserves on 26 January 2025, starting in a 1–0 Segunda Federación home win over CF Villanovense.

Pedro Fidel made his first team debut on 1 June 2025, coming on as a late substitute for Dion Lopy in a 2–0 Segunda División home win over CD Tenerife.
