= Clayton Diandy =

Senegalese association football player (born 2006)

Personal information
- Full name: Clayton Silverio Diandy
- Date of birth: 29 July 2006 (age 20)
- Place of birth: São Domingos, Guinea-Bissau
- Height: 1.74 m (5 ft 8 1/2 in)
- Position: Winger

Team information
- Current team: Al-Diriyah (on loan from Aris)
- Number: 17

Youth career
- Casamance AC
- –2024: Espoirs de Guédiawaye
- 2023: → São Paulo (loan)

Senior career*
Years	Team	Apps	(Gls)
2024–	Aris	21	(0)
2025–	→ Al-Diriyah (loan)	38	(8)

International career^{‡}
2023	Senegal U17	4	(0)
2025–	Senegal U20	4	(0)
2026–	Senegal	1	(0)
- * Club domestic league appearances and goals as of 22:19, 17 October 2026 (UTC) ‡ National team caps and goals as of 23:59, 12 November 2026 (UTC)

Clayton Silverio Diandy (born 29 July 2006) is a professional footballer who plays for Saudi Pro League club Al-Diriyah on loan from Super League Greece club Aris. Born in Guinea-Bissau, he is a Senegal international.

== Club career ==
He was born in São Domingos, in Guinea-Bissau but moved to Senegal as a child. He trained at Casamance AC and Espoirs de Guédiawaye in Senegal. He joined the Greek club Aris Thessaloniki during the summer transfer window of 2024, agreeing to a five-year contract having been on a two-week trial in July 2024. The fee could rise to a reported €1 million if certain conditions are met. He started first-team playing matches for the club in his debut season, although he missed a month with injury.

On 27 September 2025, Diandy joined Al-Diriyah on loan.

== International career ==
He was selected for the Senegal U17 to play at the 2023 FIFA U-17 World Cup, featuring in for matches.

He played for Senegal U20 at the 2025 Under-20 Africa Cup of Nations tournament, winning a penalty in their final group game against DR Congo U20 that helped them secure a place in the knock-out rounds.

== Style of play ==
He is reportedly capable of playing on the wing, as a wide forward, or as the leader of the attack.

== Career statistics ==
=== Club ===
As of match played 25 May 2025

Appearances and goals by club, season and competition
Club	Season	League			Cup		Continental		Other		Total	
Club	Season	Division	Apps	Goals	Apps	Goals	Apps	Goals	Apps	Goals	Apps	Goals
Aris	2024–25	Superleague Greece	19	0	3	0	—		—		22	0
Aris	Total		19	0	3	0	—		—		22	0
Career total			19	0	3	0	0	0	0	0	22	0

=== International ===
As of match played 12 November 2026

Appearances and goals by national team and year
National team	Year	Apps	Goals
Senegal	2026	1	0
Total		1	0
