= Farhad Zavoshi =

Iranian footballer

Personal information
- Date of birth: 8 February 2003 (age 23)
- Place of birth: Piranshahr, Iran
- Height: 1.73 m (5 ft 8 in)
- Position: Midfielder

Team information
- Current team: Lusail
- Number: 88

Youth career
- 2015–2019: KIA
- 2019–2021: Esteghlal

Senior career*
Years	Team	Apps	(Gls)
2021–2024	Havadar	23	(0)
2024–2025	Shams Azar	3	(0)
2025–	Lusail	3	(0)

International career^{‡}
2022–	Iran U20	4	(0)
- * Club domestic league appearances and goals as of 1 February 2023 ‡ National team caps and goals as of 1 February 2023

Farhad Zavoshi (Persian: فرهاد زاوشی, born 8 February 2003) is an Iranian professional footballer who plays as a midfielder for Qatari club Lusail in the Qatari Second Division.

== Early life ==
Zavoshi is from Piranshahr, Iran.

== Club career ==
=== Early career ===
Zavoshi started his career as a youth player at KIA and then transferred to Esteghlal, where he played under youth coach Arash Borhani, a former Iran international.

=== Havadar ===
Zavoshi joined Havadar in September 2021 with two-years contract. He made his debut on 24 December 2022 in the 13th match of the 2022–23 Persian Gulf Pro League season against Nassaji Mazandaran.

== International career ==
=== Under–20 ===
In July 2022, He was invited to the Iran national under-20 football team by Samad Marfavi. In late 2022 and 2023, he was called up again to represent Iran youth national team.

== Career statistics ==
Last Update 1 February 2023

Appearances and goals by club, season and competition
Club	Season	League			cup		Continental		Total	
Club	Season	Division	Apps	Goals	Apps	Goals	Apps	Goals	Apps	Goals
Havadar	2022–23	Pro League	3	0	0	0	—		3	0
Career total			3	0	0	0	0	0	3	0
