= Yousuf Adam =

Qatari footballer and manager (born 1972)

Yusef Adam
Personal information
- Full name: Yousuf Adam Mahmoud
- Date of birth: 12 September 1972 (age 54)
- Place of birth: Qatar
- Position: Midfielder

Senior career*
Years	Team	Apps	(Gls)
1992–2006	Al-Ittihad (Doha) (Note: renamed Al Gharafa in 2004)	114	(8)
2006–2008	Al Shamal	7	(0)
2008–2009	Umm Salal	1	(0)

International career
1997–2004	Qatar	40	(0)

Managerial career
- 2010: Mesaimeer
- 2010: Somalia
- 2010: Somalia U23
- 2010–2011: Umm Salal (Assistant)
- 2011–2012: Qatar U–20 (Assistant)
- 2013: Al Shahaniya
- 2014: El Jaish
- 2014–2015: Mesaimeer
- 2015–2016: Al Ahli (Assistant)
- 2016: Al Ahli (Caretaker)
- 2016–2017: Al Ahli
- 2017–2018: Al-Markhiya
- 2018–2021: Al Kharaitiyat
- * Club domestic league appearances and goals

Yousuf Adam Mahmoud or Yousef Adam (Arabic: يوسف آدم محمود; born 12 September 1972) is a Qatari-Somali former football player and manager. He is the first Qatari football manager to have coached in Africa. He also competed in the men's tournament at the 1992 Summer Olympics.

== Managerial career ==
In 2010, Adam coached Mesaimeer SC in the Qatari Second Division. Later in 2010, he coached both the Somalia national team and the Somalia Olympic team. While he was in charge of Somalia, the team participated in the 2010 CECAFA Cup. With an average squad age of 20, Somalia lost all of its group stage matches, including 0–6 against Zambia.

Adam was unveiled as the new coach of lower-tier club Al Shahaniya in February 2013. He was named as El Jaish's new head coach on 15 January 2014.

Adam was in charge of Mesaimeer SC in the 2014–15 season, helping the club win promotion from the Qatari Second Division to the Qatar Stars League for the first time in its history. He left the club in May 2015. In June 2015, he was confirmed as assistant coach of Al Ahli. On 11 November 2018, he became the manager of Al Kharaitiyat.
