= Ismail Dahqani =

Qatari footballer (born 1991)

Ismail Dehgani
Personal information
- Full name: Ismail Mousa Dahqani
- Date of birth: 9 July 1991 (age 35)
- Place of birth: Qatar
- Height: 1.73 m (5 ft 8 in)
- Position: Right back

Team information
- Current team: Mesaimeer
- Number: 4

Youth career
- Umm Salal

Senior career*
Years	Team	Apps	(Gls)
2011–2023	Umm Salal	178	(2)
2023–	Mesaimeer	0	(0)
- * Club domestic league appearances and goals

Ismael Mousa Dehghani (Arabic:إسماعيل موسى دهقاني) (born 9 July 1991) is a Qatari footballer who plays for Mesaimeer as a right back.
