= Saad Hussain =

Qatari footballer (born 1993)

Personal information
- Date of birth: 7 March 1993 (age 33)
- Place of birth: Qatar
- Positions: Right-back; midfielder

Team information
- Current team: Al Bidda
- Number: 15

Senior career*
Years	Team	Apps	(Gls)
2013–2020	Al-Shahania		
2015	→ Al-Rayyan (loan)		
2020–2024	Al-Salliya	65	(0)
2024–2025	Muaither	13	(0)
2025–	Al Bidda	2	(0)
- * Club domestic league appearances and goals as of 2 February 2025

Saad Hussain (Arabic: سعد حسين; born 7 March 1993) is a Qatari footballer. He currently plays for Al Bidda.
