= Abderahman Samir =

Egyptian footballer (born 1987)

Abderahman Samir عبد الرحمن سمير
Personal information
- Full name: Abderahman Samir Sayed
- Date of birth: 26 March 1987 (age 39)
- Place of birth: Egypt
- Position: Midfielder

Senior career*
Years	Team	Apps	(Gls)
2010–2023	Mesaimeer		
- * Club domestic league appearances and goals

Abderahman Samir (Arabic:عبد الرحمن سمير; born 26 March 1987) is an Egyptian footballer who plays as a Midfielder.
