= Cristian (footballer, born 1999) =

Brazilian footballer

Personal information
- Full name: Cristian Daniel Dal Bello Fagundes
- Date of birth: 14 December 1999 (age 26)
- Place of birth: Pelotas, Brazil
- Height: 1.78 m (5 ft 10 in)
- Position: Right winger

Team information
- Current team: Al-Sailiya (on loan from Al Bidda)
- Number: 22

Youth career
- –2019: Brasil de Pelotas

Senior career*
Years	Team	Apps	(Gls)
2019–2021	Brasil de Pelotas	36	(2)
2020–2021	→ Botafogo (PB) (loan)	7	(0)
2021–	Zorya Luhansk	19	(1)
2022	→ Caxias-RS (loan)	0	(0)
2023	Mladost GAT	14	(1)
2023–	Al Bidda	30	(10)
2026–	→ Al-Sailiya (loan)	0	(0)
- * Club domestic league appearances and goals as of 9 May 2023

Cristian Daniel Dal Bello Fagundes (born 14 December 1999), known as Cristian, is a Brazilian professional footballer who plays as a forward for Al-Sailiya, on loan from Al Bidda.

== Club career ==
In June 2021, Cristian switched to Ukrainian club Zorya Luhansk.

At the end of 2022, Christian joined Serbian Superliga side Mladost GAT.

== Honours ==
Individual

- Serbian SuperLiga Player of the Week: 2022–23 (Round 21)
