= Abdurahman Waleed =

Qatari footballer (born 1994)

Personal information
- Full name: Abdurahman Waleed Mohammed Mansor
- Date of birth: 25 March 1994 (age 32)
- Place of birth: Qatar
- Position: Midfielder

Youth career
- El Jaish

Senior career*
Years	Team	Apps	(Gls)
2014–2016	El Jaish	4	(0)
2016	→ Umm Salal (loan)	1	(0)
2016–2017	Muaither	11	(0)
2017–2019	Al Arabi	28	(1)
2019–2023	Al-Shamal		
- * Club domestic league appearances and goals

Abdurahman Waleed (Arabic: عبد الرحمن وليد; born 25 March 1994) is a Qatari footballer who plays as a midfielder.
