= Mohammad Muntasser =

Qatari footballer (born 1989)

Mohammad Muntasser محمد منتصر
Personal information
- Full name: Mohammad Muntasser Abdulraouf Khuroob
- Date of birth: 8 August 1989 (age 37)
- Place of birth: Qatar
- Height: 1.86 m (6 ft 1 in)
- Position: Goalkeeper

Team information
- Current team: Al-Waab
- Number: 1

Youth career
- Al-Wakrah

Senior career*
Years	Team	Apps	(Gls)
2011–2017	Al-Wakrah	17	(0)
2017–2020	Al-Markhiya	-	(-)
2020	Al-Gharafa	2	(0)
2020–2022	Umm Salal	0	(0)
2022–2023	Al-Khor	0	(0)
2023–	Al-Waab	11	(0)
- * Club domestic league appearances and goals

Mohammad Muntasser (Arabic:محمد منتصر) (born 8 September 1989) is a Qatari footballer. He currently plays for Al-Waab as a goalkeeper.

== Career ==
=== Al-Wakrah ===
Mohammad Muntasser started his career at Al-Wakrah and is a product of the Al-Wakrah's youth system. On 15 October 2011, Muntasser made his professional debut for Al-Wakrah against Qatar SC in the Pro League, replacing Ali Rahma Al-Marri .

=== Al-Markhiya ===
On 29 June 2017, he left Al-Wakrah and signed with Al-Markhiya. On 15 October 2017, Muntasser made his professional debut for Al-Makhiya against Al-Rayyan in the Pro League .

=== Al-Gharafa ===
On 2 January 2020, he left Al-Markhiya and signed with Al-Gharafa. On 28 February 2020, Muntasser made his professional debut for Al-Gharafa against Al-Sailiya SC in the Pro League, replacing Qasem Burhan .

=== Umm Salal ===
On 30 August 2020, left Al-Gharafa and signed with Umm Salal.
