= Mamadou Gning =

Senegalese association football player (born 2006)

Personal information
- Date of birth: 22 December 2006 (age 19)
- Place of birth: Saly, Senegal
- Height: 1.80 m (5 ft 11 in)
- Position: Midfielder

Team information
- Current team: Aris
- Number: 25

Youth career
- DSFA
- –2025: Espoirs de Guédiawaye

Senior career*
Years	Team	Apps	(Gls)
2025–	Aris	7	(0)

International career^{‡}
2023	Senegal U17	5	(0)
2023	Senegal U20	4	(0)
- * Club domestic league appearances and goals as of 10 May 2026 ‡ National team caps and goals as of 22 November 2023

Mamadou Gning (born 22 December 2006) is a Senegalese professional footballer who plays as a midfielder for Greek Super League club Aris Thessaloniki.

== Club career ==
He was born in the city of Saly Portudal, and played as a midfielder for the Espoirs de Guédiawaye academy and the Dutch Senegalese Football Academy (DSFA). He trained with Norwegian club Molde FK in 2023, and later in Denmark with FC Copenhagen.

He joined Super League Greece club Aris on a five-year contract in January 2025 for a fee reported be €2 million. He made his debut for the club on 10 May 2025 in the Greek Super League play-off round in a 4–2 win against Asteras Tripolis.

== International career ==
He has played at international level for Senegal U17 and Senegal U20, including at the 2023 Africa Cup of Nations U20 and the 2023 FIFA U-17 World Cup.

== Career statistics ==
As of match played 25 May 2025

Club	Season	League			Cup		Continental		Other		Total	
Club	Season	Division	Apps	Goals	Apps	Goals	Apps	Goals	Apps	Goals	Apps	Goals
Aris	2024–25	Superleague Greece	1	0	0	0	—		—		1	0
Aris	Total		1	0	0	0	—		—		1	0
Career total			1	0	0	0	0	0	0	0	1	0
