= Panagiotis Symelidis =

Greek footballer

Personal information
- Date of birth: 3 November 1992 (age 34)
- Place of birth: Kozani, Greece
- Height: 1.77 m (5 ft 9 1/2 in)
- Position: Winger

Team information
- Current team: Levadiakos
- Number: 31

Youth career
- –2009: Akrites Kozani, AE Ellispontos

Senior career*
Years	Team	Apps	(Gls)
2009–2011	Ethnikos Vateros		
2011–2012	Tilikratis	21	(2)
2012–2015	Ermionida	72	(20)
2015–2016	Apollon Smyrnis	14	(1)
2016	Agrotikos Asteras	13	(0)
2016–2018	Apollon Pontus	57	(12)
2018–2019	Trikala	23	(6)
2019–2021	Levadiakos	41	(2)
2021	AEL	5	(0)
2022–	Levadiakos	107	(8)
- * Club domestic league appearances and goals as of 13 September 2026

Panagiotis Symelidis (Greek: Παναγιώτης Συμελίδης; born 3 November 1992) is a Greek professional footballer who plays as a winger for Super League club Levadiakos.

== Honours ==
Levadiakos

- Super League 2: 2021–22
