= Abdallah Al Anzi =

Qatari footballer (born 1995)

Abdallah Al Anzi عبد الله العنزي
Personal information
- Full name: Abdallah Hussein Ammash Al Anzi
- Date of birth: 9 January 1995 (age 31)
- Place of birth: Qatar
- Position: Forward

Youth career
- Al-Kharaitiyat

Senior career*
Years	Team	Apps	(Gls)
2017–2019	Al-Kharaitiyat	29	(0)
2019–2020	Al-Sailiya	0	(0)
2020–2022	Muaither		
2022–2024	Lusail		
- * Club domestic league appearances and goals

Abdullah Al Anzi (Arabic: عبد الله العنزي) (born 9 January 1995) is a Qatari footballer who plays as a forward.

== Career ==
=== Al-Kharaitiyat ===
Al Anzi started his career at Al-Kharaitiyat and is a product of the Al-Kharaitiyat's youth system. On 22 September 2017, Al Anzi made his professional debut for Al-Kharaitiyat against Al-Rayyan in the Pro League, replacing Sanzhar Tursunov.

=== Al-Sailiya ===
On 21 August 2019 left Al-Kharaitiyat and signed with Al-Sailiya.
