= Mohamed Emad Ayash =

Qatari footballer (born 2001)

Mohamed Ayash
Personal information
- Full name: Mohamed Emad Omar Ayash
- Date of birth: 27 February 2001 (age 25)
- Place of birth: Qatar
- Height: 1.87 m (6 ft 2 in)
- Position: Defender

Team information
- Current team: Qatar (on loan from Al-Duhail)
- Number: 15

Youth career
- –2019: Aspire Academy
- –2019: Al-Duhail

Senior career*
Years	Team	Apps	(Gls)
2019–	Al-Duhail	10	(0)
2019–2020	→ Al-Ahli (loan)	5	(0)
2020	→ Al-Ahli (loan)	3	(0)
2021–2022	→ Al-Wakrah (loan)	16	(1)
2023	→ Al-Rayyan (loan)	4	(1)
2023–2024	→ Al-Ahli (loan)	14	(0)
2025–2026	→ Al-Wakrah (loan)	6	(0)
2026–	→ Qatar (loan)	1	(1)

International career
2019–2020	Qatar U20	2	(0)
2019–2024	Qatar U23	24	(0)
2020	Qatar	1	(0)
- * Club domestic league appearances and goals as of 17 January 2026

Mohamed Emad Ayash (Arabic: محمد عماد عياش; born 27 February 2001) is a Qatari professional football player who plays as a defender for Qatar, on loan from Al-Duhail.

== Club career ==
Ayash started his career at the youth teams of Al-Duhail, He reached the first team in the 2019–2020 season. On 23 September 2019, joined side Al-Ahli on a half-year loan On 6 July 2020, joined side Al-Ahli on a half-year loan. On 2 January 2021, joined side Al-Wakrah on a half-year loan On 4 October 2023, joined side Al-Rayyan on a one-year loan. On 21 July 2023, joined side Al-Ahli on a one-year loan. On 18 July 2025, joined side Al-Wakrah on a one-year loan.
