= Monkez Adi =

Qatari footballer (born 1997)

Monkez Adi منقذ عدي
Personal information
- Full name: Monkez Mohammed Jihad Adi
- Date of birth: 22 January 1997 (age 29)
- Place of birth: Doha, Qatar
- Position: Right back

Youth career
- Aspire Academy
- 1998–2016: Al-Gharafa

Senior career*
Years	Team	Apps	(Gls)
2016–2021	Al-Gharafa	23	(0)
2016–2017	→ Eupen (loan)	0	(0)
2020–2021	→ Umm Salal (loan)	1	(0)
2021–2024	Mesaimeer	37	(1)
2024–2026	Muaither	24	(1)

International career
- Qatar U20
- * Club domestic league appearances and goals

Monkez Adi (Arabic:منقذ عدي) (born 22 January 1997) is a Qatari footballer. He currently plays as a right back. He has also played for the Qatar U-20 team.

== Career ==
=== Youth career ===
Monkez Adi started his career at Al-Gharafa and is a product of the Aspire Academy's youth system.

=== Eupen ===
On 8 July 2016, left Al-Gharafa and signed with Eupen on loan of the season.

=== Al-Gharafa ===
In 2017/2018 Season back To Al-Gharafa . On 15 July 2017, Monkez Adi made his professional debut for Al-Gharafa against Al-Ahli in the Pro League .

== Personal life ==
Monkez Adi was born in the Qatari capital, Doha, to Syrian parents from the city of Hama.
