= Qatar FA Cup =

- Founded: 2021; 5 years ago
- Region: Qatar
- Teams: 16
- Current champions: Al-Arabi SC (1st title)
- Most championships: Al-Sailiya SC (1 title); Al-Arabi SC(1 title)
- 2022

The Qatar FA Cup is an annual knockout football competition in domestic Qatari football. The tournament was announced right after the 2020–21 Qatar Stars League ended, where the bottom 8 teams from the Qatar Stars League and the entire Qatari Second Division participate.

== History ==
- 2021 : Al Sailiya 1–0 Al Markhiya
- 2022 : Al-Arabi SC 3–2 Lusail SC
- 2024 : Al Bidda SC 1–1 (4–3 pen) Al Shahaniya SC
