= Al-Waab SC =

Association football club in Al Rayyan, Qatar

Al-Waab
- Full name: Al-Waab SC
- Founded: 2014; 12 years ago as Al Nasr; 2019; 7 years ago as Al Waab
- Ground: Doha Sport Stadium; Al Waab, Qatar
- Capacity: 3,000
- Manager: Ahmed Abdelsalem
- League: Qatari Second Division
- 2024–25: 4th of 8
Home colours	Away colours

Al-Waab Sporting Club (Arabic: نادي الوعب الرياضي) is a Qatari football team based in the Al Waab district of Doha City, playing in the Qatari Second Division.

It was officially granted club status by the Qatar Football Association in September 2019, allowing it to participate in the 2019–20 season of the Qatari Second Division.

The club was formerly Al-Nasr SC and its name was changed to Al-Waab SC.

== Current squad ==
As of Qatari Second Division:

Note: Flags indicate national team as defined under FIFA eligibility rules; some limited exceptions apply. Players may hold more than one non-FIFA nationality.

No.	Pos.	Nation	Player
1	GK	QAT	Mohammad Muntasser
3	DF	QAT	Abdulrahman Sher Khan
4	DF	QAT	Majid Janan
5	MF	QAT	Anas Elfadil
7	MF	COL	Santiago Duque
8	MF	SEN	Modou Seye
9	FW	BRA	Daniel
10	MF	POR	Diogo Abreu
11	MF	NED	Don O'Niel (on loan from Al-Ahli)
14	DF	SDN	Mohamed Abdelmagid
16	DF	QAT	Hamzah Yasser
17	FW	QAT	Mekki Tombari
19	MF	EGY	Abdelrahman Ashraf

No.	Pos.	Nation	Player
21	MF	QAT	Saud Al-Nasr
22	DF	QAT	Mohammed Abdelkader
23	GK	ITA	Francesco Plaia
26	DF	CIV	Abdoulaye Bakayoko
31	DF	QAT	Abdulqader Zoukh
32	DF	ESP	Pedro Fidel
38	FW	QAT	Yassin Gaira
66	MF	QAT	Adham Abbas
77	FW	QAT	Mohammed Meisara
90	FW	NGR	Joseph Robert
95	GK	QAT	Mohamed El Gendy
99	GK	QAT	Ibrahim Mahdi

=== Out on loan ===
Note: Flags indicate national team as defined under FIFA eligibility rules; some limited exceptions apply. Players may hold more than one non-FIFA nationality.

No.	Pos.	Nation	Player
20	FW	JOR	Baha' Faisal (on loan to Emirates Club)
