= El Jaish SC =

El-Jaish SC
- Full name: El Jaish Sports Club نادي الجيش الرياضي
- Founded: March 2007; 19 years ago
- Dissolved: 1 July 2017; 9 years ago
- Ground: Abdullah bin Khalifa Stadium; Doha, Qatar
- Capacity: 12,000
- Chairman: N/A
- Manager: Sabri Lamouchi
- League: Qatar Stars League
- 2016–17: Qatar Stars League, 4th
- Website: www.eljaish.com
Home colours	Away colours

El-Jaish Sports Club (Arabic: نادي الجيش الرياضي) was a Qatari multi-sports club from 2007 to 2017, based in the Al-Duhail area of Doha. The association football team played in the Qatar Stars League. The team won the Qatargas League prior to 2011, but were not eligible for promotion and as a result were not declared as the champions of the league. It was promoted to the first division, the Stars League, the first year after it was made eligible.

The club also had participations in other sports, most notably in handball where its team has previously achieved 3rd place in both the GCC Handball Championship and the Asian Club Handball Championship.

In April 2017, it was announced that the club would be taken over by Lekhwiya SC following the 2016–17 Qatar Stars League, and merge into Lekhwiya SC which would be rebranded as Al-Duhail SC.

== History ==
El Jaish SC was officially established in 2011 after spending several seasons in the second division without being eligible for promotion.

In its first season in the Qatar Stars League, El Jaish finished second, just two points behind champions Lekhwiya, and qualified for the 2013 AFC Champions League. After a poor start to the 2013 Champions League, El Jaish won 3 of its 4 last group stage games to emerge as the groups runners-up, setting up a Round of 16 tie against Al Ahli of Saudi Arabia. They were eliminated after losing 0–2 in the away game and 1–3 on aggregate.

In 2013, El Jaish were involved in the controversial case of Zahir Belounis not being granted an exit visa over his dispute with the club over unpaid wages.

Lekhwiya SC announced that they have taken over the club in April 2017 and the club dissolved in July 2017 while Lekhwiya got rebranded into Al-Duhail SC.

== Honours ==
- Qatari Stars Cup
  - Winners (1): 2012–13
- Qatar Cup
  - Winners (2): 2014, 2016
- Qatargas League
  - Winners (1): 2010–11

Note:

- El-Jaish were winners of the Qatargas League in 2007–08 and 2008–09 but the club was not officiated yet so they don't count as official championships

== El Jaish in Asia ==
Competition	Pld	W	D	L	GF	GA
AFC Champions League	8	3	3	2	15	12
Total	8	3	3	2	15	12

- Q = Qualification
- GS = Group stage
- R16 = Round of 16
- QF = Quarter-final
- SF = Semi-final

AFC Champions League

Round	Country	Club	Home	Away
2013
GS	(Saudi Arabia)	Al Shabab	3–0	0–2
GS	(Iran)	Tractor	3–3	4–2
GS	(United Arab Emirates)	Al Jazira	3–1	1–1
R16	(Saudi Arabia)	Al Ahli	1–1	0–2

== Personnel ==
As of May 23, 2014

=== Senior team ===
Coaching staff
Head coach	(France) Sabri Lamouchi
Assistant coach	(Austria) Lassaad Chabbi
Assistant coach	(Qatar) Yousef Adam
Reserve head coach	(Romania) Cristian Petre
Reserve asst. coach	(Qatar) Yousuf Al-Nobi
Goalkeeping coach	(Egypt) Ahmed Naji
Fitness coach	(Tunisia) Khalil Jebabli
Fitness coach	(Brazil) André Luiz Lima
Medical staff
Team doctor	(Romania) Marian Dumitru
Physiotherapist	(Romania) Sorin Minea
Physiotherapist	(Tunisia) Mohamed Ali Laid
Physiotherapist	(Tunisia) Badii Al-Tayib
Kinesiologist	(Canada) Nabyl Bekraoui
Specialist staff
Translator	(Jordan) Abdelrahman Naim
Translator	(South Korea) Hoyeong Ju
Photographer	(Romania) Adrian Alexandru
Administrative staff
Team manager	(Qatar) Rashid Al-Kaabi
Team administrator	(Qatar) Ismail Hashem
Logistics officer	(Qatar) Nasser Al-Shammari

=== Youth team ===
Last update: May 24, 2013

Coaching staff
Head coach	(Egypt) Aref Awadh Salem
Assistant coach	(Serbia) Zoran Lović
Goalkeeping coach	(Portugal) Pedro Lascarim
Physiotherapist	(Tunisia) Ahsan Ajoo
Technical staff
Technical Director	(Brazil) Leonardo Vitorino

== Management ==
Position	Staff
President	(Qatar) Hamad bin Ali Al Attiyah
Executive Director	(Qatar) Dr. Thani Abdulrahman Al Kuwari
Marketing & Audience Manager	(Qatar) Saeed Al-Eidah
Sports Manager	(Qatar) Yousuf Bakhit Al Kuwari
Media Manager	(Qatar) Amer Abdulrahman Al Kaabi
Financial Manager	(Qatar) Khamis Al Kuwari

Last updated: May 2012
Source: El Jaish

== Affiliated club(s) ==
- (Germany) FC Schalke 04

== Kit sponsors and manufacturers ==
Period	Kit manufacture	Shirt sponsor
2011–2017	(United States) Nike	(Qatar) NAPT

== Managerial history ==
- (Qatar) Mohammed Al Ammari (July 2007 – May 2011) / (Qatar) Yousef Al Nobi (assistant)
- (Brazil) Péricles Chamusca (June 15, 2011 – May 31, 2012) / (Brazil) Marcelo Chamusca (assistant)
- (Romania) Răzvan Lucescu (June 1, 2012 – Jan 15, 2014) / (Romania) Mihai Stoica (assistant)
- (Qatar) Yousef Adam (Jan 15, 2014 – Jan 21, 2014) / (Qatar) Yousef Al Nobi (assistant)
- (Tunisia) Nabil Maâloul (Jan 21, 2014 – Jan 26, 2014) / (Qatar) Yousef Adam (assistant)
- (Tunisia) Nabil Maâloul (Jan 26, 2014 – Dec 11, 2014) / (Tunisia) Lassaad Chabbi (assistant)
- (Qatar) Abdulqadir Almoghaisab (Dec 12, 2014 – Dec 27, 2014) / (Tunisia) Lassaad Chabbi (assistant)
- (France) Sabri Lamouchi (Dec 27, 2014 – Jul 1, 2017) / (Tunisia) Lassaad Chabbi (assistant)

== See also ==
- El Jaish SC (basketball)
- El Jaish SC (handball)
- El Jaish SC (volleyball)
