= Al Bidda SC =

Qatari association football club

Al Bidda
- Full name: Al Bidda Sports Club
- Founded: 2015
- Ground: Suheim Bin Hamad Stadium, Doha, Qatar
- Capacity: 12,000
- Chairman: Sheikh Fahad Mohammed Fahad Al Thani
- Manager: Sami Salahiddine
- League: Qatari Second Division
- 2024–25: QSL, 6th of 8
Home colours	Away colours

Al Bidda SC is a Qatari professional football club representing the Al Bidda district of Doha, playing in the Qatari Second Division. It was officially granted club status by the Qatar Football Association in September 2018, allowing to participate in the 2018–19 season of the Qatari Second Division. As part of the conditions of its entry to the second division, it was not permitted to contract foreign players or compete for promotion in its first two seasons.

== Current squad ==
Note: Flags indicate national team as defined under FIFA eligibility rules; some limited exceptions apply. Players may hold more than one non-FIFA nationality.

No.	Pos.	Nation	Player
1	GK	SWE	Filip Sidklev
2	DF	QAT	Mahmoud Tawfik
3	DF	QAT	Mohammed Daher
5	DF	CIV	Daoud Traoré
6	DF	ARG	Mirko Juárez
7	DF	QAT	Issa Al-Masoudi
8	MF	URU	Federico Dafonte
9	FW	QAT	Abdulrahim Al-Baloushi
10	FW	ESP	Hugo Alba
11	FW	BRA	Cristian
12	FW	QAT	Magid Mohamed
13	DF	QAT	Mohammed Raed
14	MF	QAT	Waseem Matar

No.	Pos.	Nation	Player
16	DF	QAT	Amgad Salah
18	FW	QAT	Ahmed Selim
19	MF	QAT	Malik Hassan
20	DF	QAT	Saad Hussain
21	MF	QAT	Fahad Abdulqawi
22	DF	UKR	Danylo Udod (on loan from Shakhtar Donetsk)
23	DF	MAR	Rayane Benaboud
28	MF	CMR	Ethini Marcel
30	GK	QAT	Ahmed Al-Haroun
33	GK	QAT	Ahmed Rashwan
66	MF	SYR	Mohammad Sibai
77	MF	PAK	Rashid Gul Sharif
88	MF	ALG	Massil Adjaoudi (on loan from Al-Wakrah)
