= Lusail SC =

Lusail Sports Club
- Full name: Lusail Sports Club
- Nickname: LSC
- Founded: 2014
- Ground: Al Seliah Stadium; Lusail, Qatar
- Capacity: 3.000
- Chairman: Nawaf Mohammed Al-Mudhahka
- Manager: Emanuel Mesquita
- League: Qatar Stars League
Home colours	Away colours

Lusail Sports Club is a Qatari professional football club representing the city of Lusail. They currently play in the Qatar Stars League.

== History ==
The club was founded in 2014 and is based at the Lusail Stadium. It was officially granted club status by the Qatar Football Association in September 2019, allowing it to participate in the Qatari Second Division.

== Honours ==
=== League ===
- Qatar Stars League 2

2025–26

== Current squad ==
As of September 2026 Note: Flags indicate national team as defined under FIFA eligibility rules; some limited exceptions apply. Players may hold more than one non-FIFA nationality.

No.	Pos.	Nation	Player
1	GK	IRI	Arsha Shakouri
2	DF	IRI	Amin Pilali
3	DF	QAT	Ali Malolah
4	DF	ARG	Franco Russo
5	MF	QAT	Abdullah Makki
6	MF	IRI	Omid Ebrahimi (on loan from Al-Shamal)
7	MF	IRI	Farhad Zavoshi
8	MF	QAT	Khaled Mohammed (on loan from Al-Duhail)
9	FW	MKD	Georg Stojanovski
10	MF	NIG	Saud Jibril
11	MF	IRI	Hamidreza Firouzi
14	FW	QAT	Khaled Waleed
15	DF	QAT	Abdulhadi Al-Oun
16	MF	IRI	Sattar Rajaeinejad
19	FW	ESP	Rodrigo

No.	Pos.	Nation	Player
20	MF	QAT	Naif Al-Hadhrami (on loan from Al-Rayyan)
21	FW	SEN	Amath Ndiaye
22	MF	ARG	Tiago Geralnik
23	DF	QAT	Yaghob Eissa
27	DF	QAT	Mohammed Ayash (on loan from Al-Duhail)
30	DF	QAT	Husam Kamal
45	MF	QAT	Muhammad Taher Khan
66	DF	IRI	Ali Nemati
68	MF	QAT	Abdulrahman Rashid
70	FW	QAT	Mohamed Khaled (on loan from Al-Wakrah)
77	GK	QAT	Mohammed Al-Ashwal
90	GK	QAT	Ayman Abdelrahman
96	GK	QAT	Amir Hassan (on loan from Al-Duhail)
98	MF	JOR	Farid Ali
