= Mesaimeer SC =

Sports club in Qatar

Al-Mesaimeer S.C.
- Full name: Al-Mesaimeer Sports Club
- Founded: 1996; 30 years ago
- Ground: Al-Sailiya Stadium
- Capacity: 3,000
- President: Abdulrahman Shathri
- Manager: Giovanni Tedesco
- League: Qatari Second Division
- 2024–25: 7th of 8
- Website: www.mesaimeerclub.com
Home colours	Away colours

Al-Mesaimeer Sports Club (Arabic: نادي المسيمير الرياضي) is a Qatari multi-sports club based in Mesaimeer. Its football department plays in the Qatari Second Division. It was previously known as Al-Nahda Sports Club, then Al-Shoala, and finally, today it is known as Mesaimeer Sports Club. It was promoted to the first division of Qatari football for the first time in the 2014–15 season.

== History ==
=== Formation ===
The club was unofficially formed in 1996 (under the name "Al-Nahda Sports Club"), located in Doha due to administrative and financial dependence of the Qatar Football Association.

In 1998 the former Heir Apparent, Jasim bin Hamad bin Khalifa Al Thani, along with the Qatar Olympic Committee, officially founded the club followed by the formation of a constituent general assembly and the election of a board of directors. In light of that period the club's name was changed to Al-Shoala.

=== Relocation to Mesaimeer ===
In 2000, the construction of the club's official headquarters in the Mesaimeer area was completed under the supervision of National Olympic Committee, consisting of an administrative building, clothes changing rooms and a football field.

The board of directors' plans were re-examined to attract the local community to the club and form a base of players in all age groups starting from the juniors to the first team and provided facilities and services ranging from sports equipment and accessories to trainers, educators and advice from professional players.

The club began its participation in sporting events and the first team was runner-up in the second league numerous times. After a period of time, junior and youth players were playing against big teams and beating them, prompting the board of directors to show diligence and attention towards the younger players. They shifted their resources towards them and trained them well and provided them with attention outside the club, assisting them in their school studies, in addition to support within the club, in the hope that they will one day represent the first team.

In the year 2004, due to the desire of the members of the club's founders and employees, the club changed its name from Al-Shoala to Al-Mesaimeer Sports Club, in accordance to the region of where the club and its headquarters are situated.

In the 2014–15 season, the club finished in second place in the Qatargas League under Yousef Adam, thus winning promotion to the Qatar Stars League for the first time in its history.

=== Name history ===
- 1996 : Founded as Al-Nahda Sports Club
- 1998 : The club renamed to Al-Shoala Sports Club
- 2004 : The club renamed to Al-Mesaimeer Sports Club

== Stadium ==
Built in 1998, the Al-Mesaimeer Stadium spans 36,000 m^{2} and features two football pitches, locker rooms and an administrative office. However, due to its insufficient capacity and facilities, the club frequently uses the 3,000-capacity Al-Sailiya Stadium as its homegrounds.

== Current squad ==
As of Qatari Second Division:

Note: Flags indicate national team as defined under FIFA eligibility rules; some limited exceptions apply. Players may hold more than one non-FIFA nationality.

No.	Pos.	Nation	Player
1	GK	QAT	Abdulrahman Erziqat
2	DF	QAT	Omar Yahya
3	DF	MAR	Omar Mekkaoui
4	DF	QAT	Ismail Dahqani
5	MF	NGR	John Emmanuel
6	MF	ALG	Mohamed Djenidi
7	DF	QAT	Monkez Adi
8	MF	ARG	Jeremías González
9	FW	TUN	Ibrahim Souissi
10	FW	CIV	Jean Evrard Kouassi
11	MF	SDN	Soliman Salah
12	MF	QAT	Abdulaziz Adel
13	DF	QAT	Yousef Houssam
14	DF	BRA	Goulart

No.	Pos.	Nation	Player
15	MF	QAT	Jassim Al-Mheiri
16	DF	EGY	Abdulhaleem Sherif
17	DF	QAT	Abdulrahman Rashid
18	MF	QAT	Faris Azadi
19	FW	QAT	Musa Abbasi
20	MF	QAT	Mohammed Al-Qadri
22	GK	EGY	Ammar Yasser
23	MF	QAT	Khalid Abdulraouf
24	MF	QAT	Mohammed Sobhi
26	DF	QAT	Hisham Kamal
31	GK	QAT	Abdulrahman Mohammed
96	DF	QAT	Ali Atashi
99	MF	QAT	Ilyas Brimil

== Management ==
=== Technical staff ===
Updated 18 June 2014.

Name	Role	Nationality
Hatem Missaoui	Head coach	(Tunisia) Tunisian
Dragan Tadić	Assistant manager	(Croatia) Croatian
Dado Kondić	Goalkeeping coach	(Croatia) Croatian
Đorđe Jorović	Fitness coach	(Serbia) Serbian
Raad Abdul Latif	Head of Youth Teams	(Iraq) Iraqi
Louay Battah	U–19 Coach	(Iraq) Iraqi
Abdulsalam Farid	U–17 Coach	(Egypt) Egyptian
Mohammed Hammam	U–15 Coach	(Egypt) Egyptian
Taha Hussein	U–14 Coach	(Egypt) Egyptian
Saleh Murad	U–19 / U–17 Gk Coach	(Egypt) Egyptian
Khaled Ali	U–15 / U–14 Gk Coach	(Egypt) Egyptian

=== Medical staff ===
Updated 18 June 2014.

Name	Role	Nationality
Ramos Caesarlona	First Team Doctor	(Philippines) Filipino
Richard Sardon Navor	Youth Teams Physiotherapist	(Philippines) Filipino
Mohammed Tawoos	Physiotherapist	(Tunisia) Tunisian
Eleni Makri	Nurse	(Greece) Greek

=== Board of directors ===
Position	Staff
President	(Qatar) Abdulrahman Shathri
Vice-president	(Qatar) Yusuf Al-Mana
Assistant Secretary	(Qatar) Abdulrahman Al-Qahtani
general secretary	(Qatar) Ibrahim Al-Mana
board member	(Qatar) Abdulrahman Al-Mana
board member	(Qatar) Ahmed Taleb
Treasurer	(Qatar) Mohammad Saeed
board member	(Qatar) Abdulkader Al-Sheikh
board member	(Qatar) Abdulrahman A. Al-Mana

Last updated: 20 October 2011
Source: Mesaimeer

== Achievements ==
- Qatari 2nd Division
  - Champions (1): 2001

== Managerial history ==
(Iraq) Raad Abdul-Latif (2001)
(Qatar) Abdullah Saad
(Romania) Costică Ștefănescu (2003)
(Brazil) Bagé
(Qatar) Hamdan Hamad (2005)
(Qatar) Obeid Jumaa
(Brazil) Paulo Henrique (2006)
(Iraq) Raad Abdul-Latif (2006–2007)
(Brazil) Fabio Araujo (2007–2008)
(Brazil) Zaluar (2008)
(Egypt) Fareed Ramzi (2008–2009)
(Brazil) Alberto Nazo (2009)
(Iraq) Raad Abdul-Latif (2009–2010)

(Qatar) Yousef Adam (2010)
(Netherlands) Danny Hoekman (Dec 2010 – Sep 2011)
(Portugal) Jorge Paixão (Sep 2011 – Jan 2013)
(Iraq) Raad Abdul-Latif (Jan 2013 – Sep 2014)
(Qatar) Yousef Adam (Sep 2014 – May 2015)
(Croatia) Rodion Gačanin (May 2015 – May 2016)
(Serbia) Željko Markov (Aug 2016 – Aug 2018)
(Croatia) Dragan Tadić (2018 –2019)
(Iraq) Raad Abdul-Latif (2019 – 2020)
(Croatia) Dragan Tadić (2020 – Nov 2020)
(Qatar) Mubarak Al-Beloushi (Nov 2020 – Jun 2021)
(Tunisia) Hatem Missaoui (Jul 2021 – )
