= Omar (name) =

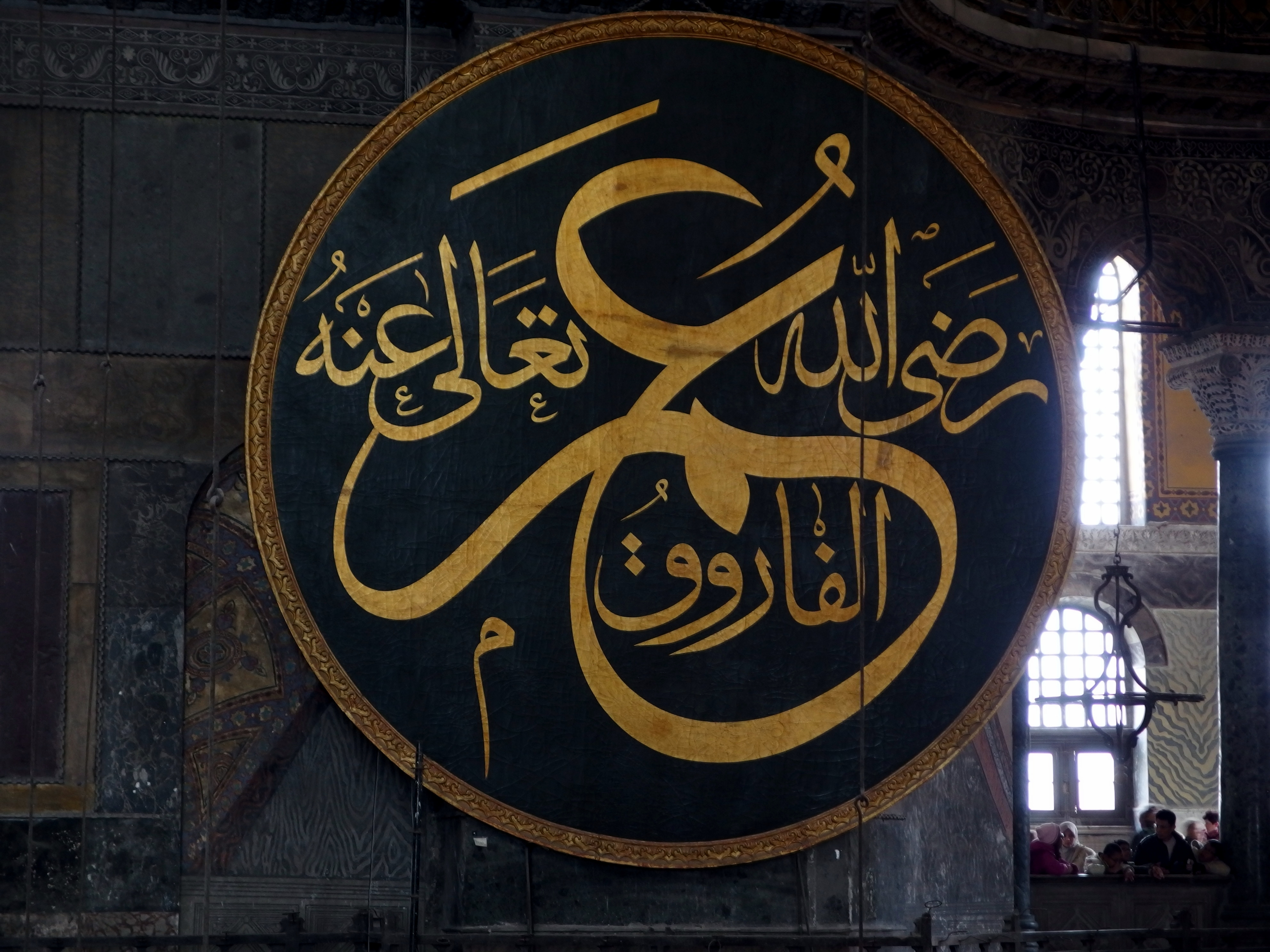
- Arabic calligraphy depicting the name of Omar (Umar Al-Fārūq), who was the most famous bearer of the most widespread form (the Arabic form) of this name.
- Pronunciation: /ˈoʊmɑːr/; /ˈoʊmər/; Arabic: [ˈʕomar]
- Gender: Male

Origin
- Origin: Semitic and Germanic
- Meaning: Arabic name (Umar): 'flourishing, long-lived'; Hebrew name (Omar): 'eloquent, gifted speaker'; Germanic name: 'wealthy, famous'
- Region of origin: Middle East (Semitic) and North Europe (Germanic)

Omar or Umar is the most common Arabic rendition of a series of names, predominantly masculine given names, originating in the Arabic language. The name may have several different spellings in English, with variations based on the original language that it is drawn from, regional/cultural adaptations, and personal choice.

== Origins ==
=== Semitic languages ===
As an Arabic name, Omar/Umar (Arabic: عمر, lit. 'flourishing' or 'long-lived') is widespread among Arabs and Muslims. In this context, it is chiefly a reference to Umar ibn al-Khattab (r. 634–644), who was one of Muhammad's companions and the second Rashidun caliph, as well as the driving force behind the success of some of the early Muslim conquests. The Turkish form of the name is Ömer, while the Bosnian form of the name is Omer.

As a Hebrew name, the omer (עומר, lit. 'sheaf' or 'bundle of grain') was an Israelite unit of measurement for grains and other dry commodities, giving way to Jewish rituals like Sefirat HaOmer and the omer offering.

=== Germanic languages ===
In the Germanic languages, the name Ómar is popular as an Icelandic name and also as a Nordic name, albeit to a much lesser extent with the latter. In this context, the name can be directly driven from the Arabic "Omar", or also a variant of Ottomar or Othmar, which are derived from a Germanic name consisting of elements *aud (lit. 'wealthy') and *mari (lit. 'famous').

== Given name ==
=== Monarchs named Omar or Umar ===
==== Caliphs ====
- Umar ibn al-Khattab or Umar I (r. 634–644), the second Rashidun caliph of Islam; father of the prophet Muhammad's wife Hafsa bint Umar
- Umar ibn Abd al-Aziz, or Umar II (r. 717–720), Umayyad caliph

==== Other monarchs ====
- Umar Kura (died 1881), Sheikh of the Kanem-Bornu Empire
- Omar Ali Saifuddin I (died 1795), Sultan of Brunei from 1762 until 1795
- Omar Ali Saifuddin II (died 1852), Sultan of Brunei from 1829 to 1852
- Omar Ali Saifuddien III (1914–1986), Sultan of Brunei from 1950 to 1967
- Omar I of Kanem, ruler of Kanem, Chad from 1372 to 1380
- Omar I of the Maldives (died 1341), sultan of the Maldives from 1306 to 1341
- Omar II of the Maldives (died 1484), sultan of the Maldives from 1480 to 1484
- Umar al-Aqta, (fl. 830s–863), emir of Melitene
- Umar Shaikh Mirza I (1356–1394), son of the Central Asian conqueror Timur
- Umar Shaikh Mirza II (1456–1494), Timurid king of Ferghana and father of Babur, founder of the Mughal Empire in India

=== Omar ===
- Omar Abada (born 1993), Tunisian basketball player
- Omar Abd al-Kafi (born 1951), Egyptian writer
- Omar Abd al-Razaq (born 1958), Palestinian politician
- Omar Abdalla Aboelazm (born 1980), Swedish citizen
- Omar Abdel-Rahman (1938–2017), Egyptian Islamist militant
- Omar Abdi, Somali-Canadian diplomat
- Omar Abdirashid Ali Sharmarke (born 1960), Somali diplomat and politician; former prime minister of Somalia
- Omar Abdul Rahman (academic) (born 1932), Malaysian academic and corporate figure
- Omar Abdulayev (born 1978), Guantanamo Bay detainee
- Omar Abdulaziz, Saudi dissident video blogger and activist
- Omar Abdullah (born 1970), Indian politician from Jammu and Kashmir
- Omar Abdulrahman (born 1991), Emirati footballer
- Omar Abu Fares (born 1984), Jordanian swimmer
- Omar Abu-Riche (1910–1990), Syrian poet
- Omar Ahmed (born 1979), Kenyan boxer
- Omar Abu Risha (1910–1990), Syrian poet and diplomat
- Omar Abu Shawish (1987–2023), Palestinian poet and writer
- Omar Acha (born 1971), Argentine historian
- Omar Suleiman Adam, Sudanese politician
- Omar Adorno (born 1972), Puerto Rican boxer
- Omar Aggad (1927–2018), Saudi Palestinian businessman
- Omar Agha (1773–1817), Dey-Pasha of Algiers
- Omar Agrebi (born 1992), Tunisian volleyball player
- Omar Aguilar (born 1959), Chilean long-distance runner
- Omar Ahmed, multiple people
- Omar Ahmed El Ghazaly (born 1984), Egyptian discus thrower
- Omar Ahmed Fadlallah (born 1956), Sudanese writer
- Omar Ahmed Majumder, Bangladeshi politician
- Omar Ahmed Sodani, Libyan murder suspect
- Omar Ahmed Tawfiq (born 1970), Iraqi association football player
- Omar Ajete (born 1965), Cuban baseball player
- Omar al-Akel (born 1980), Syrian footballer
- Omar Alfanno, Panamanian singer-songwriter of Latin music
- Omar Akhun, Uyghur composer and musical performer
- Omar Akram (born 1964), American music producer, composer and pianist
- Omar Al-Abdallat (born 1972), Jordanian singer-songwriter
- Omar Al-Amadi (born 1995), Qatari footballer
- Omar Al-Aswad, Libyan politician
- Omar Al-Awadhi (born 1982), Emirati tennis player
- Omar Al Busaidy (born 1986), Emirati businessman and writer
- Omar Al-Dahi (born 1999), Yemeni footballer
- Omar Al Futtaim, Emirati businessman
- Omar Al-Ghamdi (born 1979), Saudi Arabian footballer
- Omar Al-Malki (born 1994), Omani professional footballer
- Omar Al-Muqbil (born 1972), Islamic scholar-professor of Islamic law
- Omar Al-Muziel (born 1992), Saudi Arabian footballer
- Omar Al Olama (born 1990), United Arab Emirates politician
- Omar Al-Owdah (born 1998), Saudi Arabian footballer
- Omar Al-Ruwaili (born 1999), Saudi Arabian association footballer
- Omar Al-Sabahi (born 1977), Egyptian rower
- Omar Al-Safadi (born 1994), Qatari handball player
- Omar Juma Al-Salfa (born 1989), Emirati sprinter
- Omar Al-Shaheen (born 1992), Kuwaiti pool player
- Omar Al-Shammaa (born 1946), Lebanese film and voice director
- Omar Al-Sohaymi (born 1993), Saudi Arabian footballer
- Omar Al Somah (born 1989), Syrian footballer
- Omar Al-Sonain (born 1995), Saudi Arabian footballer
- Omar Al-Tawer (born 1979), Moroccan novelist, researcher and academic
- Omar Al-Yaqoubi (born 1987), Omani association football referee
- Omar Al-Zayni (born 1996), Saudi association football player
- Omar Alderete (born 1996), Paraguayan footballer
- Omar Alam (born 1985), Indian cricketer
- Omar Albertto (born 1957), American businessman
- Omar Alexander Cardenas (born 1995), American fugitive
- Omar Alfanno (born 1957), Panamanian singer-songwriter
- Omar Alghabra (born 1969), Canadian politician
- Omar Alghanim (born 1973), Kuwaiti businessman
- Omar Ali, multiple people
- Omar Ali Abdillahi, Somali politician
- Omar Ali Juma (1941–2001), Tanzanian politician
- Omar Ali Omar (born 1981), Emirati footballer
- Omar Ali Saifuddin, multiple people
- Omar Ali-Shah (1922–2005), Afghan-Sufi teacher and writer
- Omar Allibhoy, Spanish chef
- Omar Almeida Quintana (born 1981), Cuban chess grandmaster
- Omar Alshogre (born 1995), Syrian refugee, torture survivor, a public speaker and human rights activist
- Omar Altimimi (born 1965), Dutch criminal
- Omar Álvarez (born 1990), Spanish footballer
- Omar Amanat (born 1972), American convicted felon and entrepreneur
- Omar Amr (born 1974), American water polo player
- Omar Anas (born 1933), Sudanese sport shooter
- Omar Andrade (born 1986), Ecuadorian footballer and manager
- Omar Anwar (born 1983), English cricketer
- Omar Apollo (born 1997), American musician
- Omar Aquino (born 1987), American politician
- Omar Aramayo (born 1947), Peruvian poet and composer
- Omar Arellano, multiple people
- Omar Arjoune (born 1996), Moroccan footballer
- Omar Arroyo (born 1956), Costa Rican footballer
- Omar Asad (born 1971), Argentine footballer
- Omar Ashmawy, American lawyer
- Omar Ashour, British-Canadian academic
- Omar Assar (born 1991), Egyptian table tennis player
- Omar Athamneh (born 1983), Jordanian football player
- Omar Atlas (born 1938), former Venezuelan professional wrestler
- Omar Avila, Cuban-American actor
- Omar Avilán (born 1977), Mexican footballer
- Omar Ayub Khan (born 1970), Pakistani politician
- Omar Ayuso (born 1998), Spanish actor
- Omar Aziz (born 1958), Brazilian politician
- Omar Aziz (anarchist) (1949–2013), Syrian anarchist, intellectual and revolutionary
- Omar Azzeb (born 1960), Algerian handball player
- Omar Azziman (born 1947), Moroccan advisor
- Omar el Baad (born 1996), Dutch footballer
- Omar Badsha (born 1945), South African artist and activist
- Omar Bagasra (born 1948), Pakistani-American molecular biologist, biotechnologist and author
- Omar Bah (born 1979), American journalist
- Omar Bakhashwain (born 1962), Saudi Arabian footballer
- Omar Bakri Muhammad (born 1958), Syrian Muslim militant who lived in the UK for 20 years and was later arrested as a terrorist
- Omar Balafrej (born 1973), Moroccan politician
- Omar Banos (born 1998, known professionally as Cuco), American singer-songwriter and record producer
- Omar Barboza (born 1944), Venezuelan politician
- Omar Barghouti (born 1964), Qatari-Palestinian activist
- Omar Bari (born 1986), Guinean-born Qatari footballer
- Omar Baroud (born 1991/92), Dutch actor and writer
- Omar Basaad (born 1988), Saudi Arabian musician
- Omar Bashir (musician) (born 1970), Iraqi-Hungarian musician
- Omar al-Bashir (born 1944), former President of Sudan
- Omar Bayless (born 1996), American football player
- Omar al-Bayoumi, Saudi national terror suspect
- Omar Bazán Flores (born 1976), Mexican politician
- Omar Beća (born 2002), Bosnian footballer
- Omar Beckles (born 1991), Grenadian footballer
- Omar Belatoui (born 1969), Algerian footballer and manager
- Omar Belbey (born 1973), Algerian footballer
- Omar Belhouchet (born 1954), Algerian journalist
- Omar Beltré (born 1981), Dominican baseball player
- Omar Benchiheb, Algerian Paralympic athlete
- Omar Bencomo (born 1989), Venezuelan baseball player
- Omar Bendriss (born 1984), Moroccan footballer
- Omar Benjelloun (c. 1934–1975), Moroccan journalist and politician
- Omar Benson Miller (born 1978), American actor
- Omar Benzerga (born 1990), Algerian and French footballer
- Omar Berdiýew (1979–2023), Turkmenistan footballer
- Omar Berdouni (born 1979), Moroccan actor
- Omar Bertazzo (born 1989), Italian bicycle racer
- Omar Betrouni (born 1949), Algerian footballer
- Omar Blebel (1922–2002), Argentine wrestler
- Omar Bliadze (born 1942), Georgian Greco-Roman wrestler
- Omar Blondin Diop (1946–1973), West African anti-colonial revolutionary and artist
- Omar Bogle (born 1993), English footballer
- Omar Bolden (born 1988), American football player
- Omar Bongo (1935–2009), President of Gabon (1967–2009)
- Omar Antonio Borboa (born 1980), Mexican politician
- Omar Borrás (1929–2022), Uruguayan football manager
- Omar Bradley (1893–1981), American 5-star general, one of the main U.S. Army field commanders in North Africa and Europe during World War II
- Omar Bradley (politician) (born 1958), mayor of Compton, California from 1993 until 2001
- Omar Bravo (born 1980), international Mexican football player
- Omar Briceño (born 1978), Mexican footballer
- Omar Brown, multiple people
- Omar Browne (born 1994), Panamanian footballer
- Omar Bryan (born 1984), Caymanian wrestler
- Omar Bugiel (born 1992), Lebanese footballer
- Omar Buludov (born 1998), Azerbaijani footballer
- Omar Bundy (1861–1940), career United States Army officer and general
- Omar B. Bunnell (1912–1992), American businessman and politician
- Omar Burleson (1906–1991), American politician
- Omar Bustani (born 1966), Mexican archer
- Omar Caetano (1938–2008), Uruguayan footballer
- Omar Andrés Camacho (born 1981), minister of Mines and Energy of Colombia since 2023
- Omar Camporese (born 1968), former professional tennis player
- Omar Campos (born 2002), Mexican footballer
- Omar Cañas (1969–1993), Colombian footballer
- Omar Sheriff Captan, Ghanaian actor
- Omar Carabalí (born 1997), Ecuadorian-born Chilean footballer
- Omar Carrasco (1974–1994), Argentine murder victim
- Omar Catarí (born 1964), Venezuelan boxer
- Omar Catunda (1913–1998), Brazilian mathematician
- Omar Chabán (1952–2014), Argentine nightclub owner
- Omar Chaparro (born 1972), Mexican actor
- Omar Charef (born 1981), Moroccan footballer
- Omar Chávez (born 1990), Mexican boxer
- Omar Chehade (born 1970), Peruvian lawyer and politician, Second Vice President of Peru
- Omar Chokhmane (born 1948), Moroccan sprinter
- Omar Chraïbi (born 1961), Moroccan production manager and director
- Omar Cisneros (born 1989), Cuban hurdler
- Omar Ciss (born 2001), Senegalese footballer
- Omar Clayton (born 1989), American football player
- Omar Cojolum (born 1988), Mexican gridiron football player
- Omar Colley (born 1992), Gambian footballer
- Omar D. Conger (1818–1898), American politician
- Omar Cook (born 1982), American-born Montenegrin basketball player
- Omar Cooper (born 2003), American football player
- Omar Córdoba (born 1994), Panamanian footballer
- Omar Correa (born 1953), Uruguayan footballer
- Omar Cortés (born 1977), Spanish gymnast
- Omar Craddock (born 1991), American triple jumper
- Omar D. Crothers (died 1946), American politician and lawyer
- Omar D. Crothers Jr. (1909–1953), American politician and lawyer
- Omar Cuff (born 1984), American football player
- Omar Cummings (born 1982), Jamaican footballer
- Omar da Fonseca (born 1959), Argentine footballer
- Omar Daal (born 1972), Venezuelan baseball player
- Omar Dabaj (born 1969), Jordanian boxer
- Omar Daf (born 1977), Senegalese footballer and manager
- Omar Abdallah Dakhqan (died 2012), Jordanian politician
- Omar Dallah (1936–1997), Hong Kong field hockey player
- Omar Daley (born 1981), Jamaican footballer
- Omar Daniel, multiple people
- Omar Daoud (1983–2018), Libyan footballer
- Omar De Felippe (born 1962), Argentine former footballer
- Omar de Jesús (born 1976), Ecuadorian footballer
- Omar de la Cruz (fighter) (born 1979), Dominican mixed martial arts fighter
- Omar de la Cruz (footballer) (born 2001), Dominican footballer
- Omar De Marchi (born 1966), Argentine politician
- Omar Degan (born 1990), Italian-born Somali architect
- Omar Deghayes (born 1969), Libyan citizen
- Omar Derdour (1913–2009), Algerian nationalist
- Omar Devani (born 1940), Argentine retired footballer
- Omar Dhani (1924–2009), former commander-in-chief of the Indonesian Air Force
- Omar Dia (born 1955), Senegalese basketball player
- Omar Diallo (born 1972), Senegalese football goalkeeper
- Omar Victor Diop (born 1980), Senegalese photographer
- Omar Domínguez (born 1988), Mexican footballer
- Omar Doom (born 1976), American actor
- Omar Dorsey (born 1975), American actor
- Omar Douglas (born 1972), American football player
- Omar Bully Drammeh (born 2002), Norwegian football player
- Omar Duarte (born 1995), Colombian footballer
- Omar Kent Dykes (born 1950), American blues guitarist and singer
- Omar Easy (born 1977), Jamaican-born American football player
- Omar Eddahri (born 1990), Swedish footballer
- Omar Edwards (born 1980), Jamaican football coach
- Omar Eissa (born 1996), Egyptian swimmer
- Omar El Akkad (born 1982), Egyptian-Canadian novelist and journalist
- Omar El Bahraoui, Moroccan politician
- Omar El Borolossy (born 1975), Egyptian squash player
- Omar El Geziry (born 1985), Egyptian modern pentathlete
- Omar El-Hadary (c. 1924–2003), Egyptian equestrian
- Omar El-Hariri (c. 1944–2015), Minister of Military Affairs of the National Transitional Council of Libya
- Omar El Hilali (born 2003), Moroccan footballer
- Omar El Kaddouri (born 1990), Moroccan footballer
- Omar El Kurdi (born 1992), Lebanese footballer
- Omar El-Nagdi (1931–2019), Egyptian painter
- Omar El Said (born 1990), Egyptian footballer
- Omar El-Sammany (born 1978), Egyptian water polo player
- Omar El Sawy (born 2004), Romanian footballer
- Omar El Turk (born 1981), Lebanese Canadian basketball player
- Omar El-Wakil (born 1988), Egyptian handball player
- Omar El-Zein (born 1985), Lebanese-born German footballer
- Omar Elabdellaoui (born 1991), Norwegian footballer
- Omar Elba (born 1983), Egyptian-American actor
- Omar Elhussieny (born 1985), Egyptian footballer
- 'Omar Ellison (born 1971), American football player
- Omar Elvir (born 1989), Honduran footballer
- Omar Elwary (1903–1972), Palestinian politician
- Omar Embarek (born 1998), Algerian footballer
- Omar Ennafatti (born 1980), Canadian-born Hungarian ice hockey player
- Omar Epps (born 1973), American actor
- Omar Er Rafik (born 1986), French footballer
- Omar Esparza (born 1988), Mexican footballer
- Omar Espinosa (born 1984), American musician
- Omar Estevez (born 1998), baseball player
- Omar Evans (born 1976), American gridiron football player
- Omar Fadel (born 1977), American composer
- Omar Faraj (born 2002), Swedish footballer
- Omar Farrugia, Maltese politician
- Omar Faruk Babu (born 1994), Bangladeshi footballer
- Omar Fateh (born 1990), American politician
- Omar Fayad (born 1962), former governor of Hidalgo, Mexico
- Omar Fayed (born 1987), environmentalist and publisher
- Omar Fayed (footballer, born 2003) (born 2003), Egyptian footballer
- Omar Feitosa (born 1967), Brazilian football manager
- Omar Fernández (born 1993), Colombian footballer
- Omar Ferrari (born 1959), Argentine rower
- Omar Ferwana (1956–2023), Palestinian gynaecologist
- Omar Fetmouche (born 1955), Algerian artist
- Omar Fierro (born 1963), Mexican television actor and host
- Omar Figueroa (disambiguation)
- Omar Mohamed El-Sayed Fikri (born 1965), Egyptian writer and astronomer
- Omar Muhamoud Finnish (born 1965), Somali faction leader
- Omar Fleitas (born 1991), Spanish footballer
- Omar Flores (born 1979), Mexican footballer
- Omar Flores Majul (born 1975), Mexican politician
- Omar Fonstad el Ghaouti (born 1990), Norwegian footballer
- Omar Font (born 1990), Spanish Paralympic swimmer
- Omar Fraile (born 1990), Spanish cyclist
- Omar Franco, Dominican singer
- Omar Gaber (born 1992), Egyptian footballer
- Omar Gaither (born 1984), American football player
- Omar Borkan Al Gala (born 1989), Iraqi model, actor and photographer
- Omar Galanti (born 1973), Italian pornographic film actor
- Omar Gamal (born 1982), Egyptian footballer
- Omar García (disambiguation)
- Omar Gassama, Gambian politician
- Omar Gaye (born 1998), Gambian footballer
- Omar Ibrahim Ghalawanji (born 1954), Syrian politician
- Omar Ghizlat (born 1950), Moroccan sprinter
- Omar Saif Ghobash (born 1971), Emirati diplomat and author
- Omar Gjesteby (1899–1979), Norwegian trade unionist and politician
- Omar Hugo Gómez (1955–2021), Argentine footballer
- Omar Gonzalez (born 1988), American footballer
- Omar Gooding (born 1976), American actor
- Omar Govea (born 1996), Mexican footballer
- Omar Graffigna (1926–2019), Argentine Air Force officer
- Omar Grant, American music executive
- Omar Guerra (born 1981), Colombian footballer
- Omar Gutiérrez (born 1967), Argentine politician
- Omar al-Haddouchi (born 1970), Moroccan Islamic scholar
- Omar Haji Saad (born 1949), Malaysian cyclist
- Omar Hajjami (born 1990), Moroccan taekwondo practitioner
- Omar Hakim (born 1959), American drummer, arranger and composer
- Omar Ould Hamaha (1965–2014), Islamist militia commander
- Omar Hambagda (1949–2016), Nigerian politician
- Omar Hamdi (artist) (c. 1952–2015), Syrian artist
- Omar Hamdi (comedian), British comedian and TV host
- Omar Hamenad (born 1969), Algerian footballer
- Omar Ibrahim Hammad (born 1986), Sudanese footballer
- Omar Hammayil (b. 1976/77), mayor of Al-Bireh in the West Bank in the Palestinian territories
- Omar Hani (born 1999), Jordanian footballer
- Omar Hantoli (born 2005), Palestinian taekwondo athlete
- Omar Hasanin (born 1978), Syrian cyclist
- Omar Hashi Aden (died 2009), Somali politician
- Omar Hassan (disambiguation)
- Omar al-Hassi (born 1959), Libyan politician
- Omar Hawsawi (born 1985), Saudi Arabian footballer
- Omar Hayat (born 1983), Danish cricketer
- Omar Hayssam (born 1963), Syrian-born Romanian financier
- Omar Hemidi (born 1986), Syrian footballer
- Omar Henry (born 1952), South African cricketer
- Omar Hermansen (1913–1998), Danish rower
- Omar Hernandez (disambiguation)
- Omar Hesham (born 1995), Egyptian basketball player
- Omar Hilale (born 1951), Moroccan diplomat
- Omar Hinestroza (born 1994), Panamanian footballer
- Omar Holness (born 1994), Jamaican footballer
- Omar Hughes (born 1982), Grenadian swimmer
- Omar Hurricane, American 20th-21st century physicist
- Omar Hussein (born 1986), stand-up comedian
- Omar ibn Said (1770–1864), West African/American scholar
- Omar Farah Iltireh (1933–2008), Djiboutian politician
- Omar Imeri (born 1999), Macedonian-Albanian footballer
- Omar Infante (born 1981), Venezuelan former Major League Baseball player
- Omar Ishrak (born 1955), Bangladeshi-American businessman
- Omar Islas (born 1996), Mexican footballer
- Omar Jaafar, Malaysian politician
- Omar Jacobs (born 1984), American football player
- Omar Jagne (born 1992), Gambian footballer
- Omar Israel Jaime (born 1981), Mexican footballer
- Omar A. Jallow (1946–2023), Gambian politician
- Omar Jama (born 1998), Finnish footballer
- Omar Jara (born 1965), Chilean politician
- Omar Jarun (born 1983), Palestinian footballer
- Omar Jasika (born 1997), Australian tennis player
- Omar Jasim (born 1990), Bahraini swimmer
- Omar Jasseh (born 1992), Gambian footballer
- Omar Jatta (born 1989), Gambian footballer
- Omar Jawo (born 1981), Gambian-Swedish footballer
- Omar Jazouli (1945/1946–2021), Moroccan politician
- Omar Jimenez (born 1993), American journalist and correspondent
- Omar Johnson (born 1988), Jamaican sprinter
- Omar Johnson (baseball), American baseball player and coach
- Omar J. Jones IV, US Army general
- Omar Jorge (born 1956), Argentine footballer
- Omar Jumaa (born 1995), Emirati footballer
- Omar Kâ (born 1988), Senegalese tennis player
- Omar Kabbaj (born 1942), Moroccan businessman and diplomat
- Omar Kaboré (born 1993), Burkinabé footballer
- Omar Kader (born 1986), Scottish footballer
- Omar Sharif Kale (born 2001), Somali footballer
- Omar Kamal (born 1993), Egyptian footballer
- Omar Kamil (born 1949), Sri Lankan politician
- Omar Karami (1934–2015), former Prime Minister of Lebanon
- Omar Kavak (born 1988), Dutch-Turkish footballer
- Omar Kedjaouer (born 1974), Algerian wrestler
- Omar Keshelashvili (born 1941), Georgian economist and scientist
- Omar Khadr (born 1986), Canadian youth controversially convicted under the Military Commissions Act of 2009 of murder in violation of the law of war and providing material support for terrorism
- Omar Khailoti (born 2001), Moroccan footballer
- Omar Khairat (born 1949), Egyptian pianist & musician, founder of the Egyptian Conservatory institution
- Omar Mahmoud Khalaf (born 1990), Iraqi footballer
- Omar Khaled (born 1950), Bangladeshi writer
- Omar Khalidi (1952–2010), Indian-American Muslim scholar
- Omar Khan (disambiguation)
- Omar Khayam (drug dealer) (born 1983), British Muslim convicted drug dealer
- Omar Khayyam (1048–1131), Persian poet and scientist
- Omar Khedr (born 2006), Egyptian footballer
- Omar Khalid Khorasani (1977–2022), Pakistani militant
- Omar Khorshid (1945–1981), Egyptian guitarist, musician, composer, accompanist and actor
- Omar Khribin (born 1994), Syrian footballer
- Omar Kiam (1894–1954), American fashion and costume designer
- Omar Leslie Kilborn (1867–1920), Canadian medical missionary
- Omar Knedlik (1915–1989), American businessman
- Omar Koroma (born 1989), Gambian footballer
- Omar Kossoko (born 1988), French footballer
- Omar Krayem (born 1988), American-Palestinian basketball player
- Omar Kreim (born 1995), Moroccan former professional footballer
- Omar Labruna (born 1957), Argentine footballer and coach
- Omar al-Labwani (born 1957), Syrian doctor and artist
- Omar bin Laden (born 1981), one of the sons of Osama bin Laden
- Omar Laimina (born 1952), Moroccan tennis player
- Omar Lakehal (born 1999), Moroccan taekwondo practitioner
- Omar Lamin Abeidi (born 1988/89), Sahrawi-Spanish social worker and politician
- Omar Lara (1941–2021), Chilean poet
- Omar Larrosa (born 1947), Argentine footballer and coach
- Omar Linares (born 1967), Cuban baseball player
- Omar LinX, Canadian rapper
- Omar Lizardo (born 1974), American sociologist
- Omar Longart (born 1991), Venezuelan sprinter
- Omar López (disambiguation)
- Omar Lorméndez Pitalúa (born 1972), Mexican drug lord
- Omar Luis (born 1972), Cuban baseball player
- Omar Lulu (born 1984), Indian film director of Malayalam cinema
- Omar Lye-Fook (born 1968), British soul singer and musician known professionally as Omar
- Omar M'Dahoma (born 1987), Comorian footballer
- Omar Mabson II (born 2007), American football player
- Omar Madha (born 1968), British TV director
- Omar Magliona (born 1977), Italian racing driver
- Omar Majeed, Pakistani-Canadian film director and film editor
- Omar Malavé (1963–2021), Venezuelan baseball player and coach
- Omar Malik (born 1992), Norwegian footballer
- Omar Mansoor, British fashion designer
- Omar Marmoush (born 1999), Egyptian footballer
- Omar J. Marrero (born 1988), Puerto Rican government official
- Omar Marrufo (born 1993), Mexican footballer
- Omar Martínez (born 1966), Argentine racing driver
- Omar Marwan, Egyptian lawyer and minister of justice
- Omar Mascarell (born 1993), Equatoguinean footballer
- Omar Maskati (born 1989), American actor
- Omar Haji Massale (c. 1934–2014), commander of the Somali military
- Omar Mateen (1986–2016), the gunman in the Orlando nightclub shooting
- Omar Maute (1980–2017), Philippine Moro terrorist
- Omar McLeod (born 1994), Jamaican hurdler
- Omar Megeed (born 2005), Egyptian footballer
- Omar Meña (born 1966), Cuban track and field sprinter
- Omar Méndez (born 1934), Uruguayan footballer
- Omar Méndez (boxer) (born 1961), Nicaraguan boxer
- Omar Mendoza, multiple people
- Omar Menghi (born 1975), Italian motorcycle racer
- Omar Merlo (born 1987), Argentine-born Chilean footballer
- Omar Metioui (born 1962), Moroccan classical musician
- Omar Metwally (born 1974), American actor
- Omar Midani (born 1994), Syrian footballer
- Omar Migineishvili (born 1984), Georgian football player
- Omar Mikati (born 1944), Lebanese actor and voice actor
- Omar Milanetto (born 1975), Italian footballer
- Omar Minaya (born 1958), Dominican baseball executive
- Omar Mishkov (1977–2001), Ukrainian association football player
- Omar Miskawi (born 1935), Lebanese lawyer and politician
- Omar Moawad (born 2006), Egyptian footballer
- Omar Mohamed (born 1996), Somali professional footballer
- Omar Mohamed (gymnast) (born 1999), Egyptian artistic gymnast
- Omar Mohammed (born 1986), Iraqi historian and journalist
- Omar Mohammed (Saudi footballer) (born 1993), Saudi Arabian footballer
- Omar Monjaraz (born 1981), Mexican footballer
- Omar Monterde (born 1989), Spanish footballer
- Omar Monterola (born 1987), Venezuelan Paralympic athlete
- Omar Montes (born 1988), Spanish singer
- Omar Monza (1929–2017), Argentine basketball player
- Omar Morales (disambiguation)
- Omar Moreno (born 1952), Panamanian baseball player
- Omar Moreno Palacios (1938–2021), Argentine folk singer
- Omarr Morgan (born 1976), American former football player in the Canadian Football League
- Omar Mosaad (born 1988), Egyptian squash player
- Omar Mouallem (born 1985), Canadian writer
- Omar Mouhli (born 1986), Tunisian basketball player
- Omar Moussa (disambiguation)
- Omar Moya, Cuban Paralympic athlete
- Omar Mukhtar (1858–1931), leader of the resistance movement against the Italian military occupation of Libya
- Omar Mullick, American film director
- Omar Mahmud al-Muntasir (1930–1999), Libyan politician
- Omar al-Muqdad, Syrian journalist
- Omar Muraco (1930–2010), Argentine footballer
- Omar Musa (born 1984), Australian singer
- Omar Musaj (born 2002), Albanian footballer
- Omar Mussa (disambiguation)
- Omar Mustafa (born 1985), Swedish politician
- Omar Mwinyi (born 1958), Kenyan politician
- Omar Naber (born 1981), Slovenian singer
- Omar Naim (born 1977), Lebanese film director and screenwriter
- Omar Najdi (born 1986), Moroccan footballer
- Omar Namsaoui (born 1990), Moroccan footballer
- Omar Narváez (disambiguation)
- Omar Nasiri, Belgian spy of Moroccan origin
- Omar Natami (born 1998), Italian footballer
- Omar Navarro (born 1989), American perennial candidate
- Omar Nazar (born 1978), Afghan footballer
- Omar Nejjary (born 1972), Moroccan footballer
- Omar Ngandu (born 1996), Burundian footballer
- Omar Niño Romero (born 1976), Mexican boxer
- Omar Núñez (born 1983), Nicaraguan swimmer
- Omar Nyame (born 1998), English television personality
- Omar Olivares (born 1967), Puerto Rican baseball player
- Omar Mohamed Omar (1970–2008), Somalian basketball player and coach
- Omar Yoke Lin Ong (1917–2010), co-founder of Malaysian Chinese Association, Malaysian Chinese who converted to Islam
- Omar Onsi (1901–1969), Lebanese painter
- Omar Ontiveros (born 1995), American soccer player
- Omar Oraby (born 1991), Egyptian basketball player
- Omar Ortiz (born 1976), Mexican footballer
- Omar Paganini (born 1962), Uruguayan electrical engineer, politician and professor
- Omar Palma (1958–2024), Argentine footballer and manager
- Omar Pasha (1806–1871), Serbian or Croatian Ottoman general
- Omar Perdomo (born 1993), Spanish footballer
- Omar Perotti (born 1959), former Governor of Santa Fe
- Omar Phillips (born 1986), West Indian cricketer
- Omar Pineiro (born 1997), American rapper
- Omar August Pinson (1918–1997), American murderer
- Omar Pinzón (born 1989), Colombian backstroke swimmer
- Omar Pires (born 2000), Argentine professional footballer
- Omar Pirrera (1932–2021), Italian poet
- Omar Pkhakadze (1944–1993), Georgian sprint cyclist
- Omar Ponce (born 1977), Ecuadorian football referee
- Omar Popov (born 2003), Russian footballer
- Omar Portee (born 1969), American gang leader
- Omar Pound (1926–2010), British author, son of Dorothy Shakespear and Ezra Pound
- Omar Pouso (born 1980), Uruguayan footballer
- Omar Prewitt (born 1994), American basketball player
- Omar Prieto (born 1969), Venezuelan politician
- Omar Puente (born 1961), Cuban-born violinist and jazz musician
- Omar Pumar (born 1970), Venezuelan bicycle racer
- Omar Qarada (born 1981), Jordanian Paralympic powerlifter
- Omar al-Qattan (born 1964), Palestinian-British film director and film producer
- Omar Quesada (born 1965), Peruvian lawyer and politician
- Omar Quintana (1944–2020), Ecuadorian politician
- Omar Quintanilla (born 1981), American baseball player
- Omar Quintero (born 1981), Mexican basketball player
- Omar Racim (1884–1959), Algerian painter
- Omar Radi (born 1986), Moroccan investigative journalist and human rights activist
- Omar Rajabli (born 2003), Azerbaijani judoka
- Omar Ramírez (born 1973), Mexican football manager
- Omar Ramos (born 1988), Spanish footballer
- Omar Ramsden (1873–1939), British silversmith
- Omar Rayo (1928–2010), Colombian painter, sculptor, caricaturist and plastic artist
- Omar Raza (born 1988), Scottish actor
- Omar Mohamed Razali Yeop (born 1948), Malaysian hockey player
- Omar Razzaz (born 1961), Prime Minister of Jordan
- Omar Rebahi (born 1978), Algerian judoka
- Omar Refaat, Egyptian squash player
- Omar Regan (born 1975), American film director
- Omar Rekik (born 2001), Tunisian footballer
- Omar Rezgane (born 1981), French footballer
- Omar Richards (born 1998), English footballer
- Omar Riquelme (born 1985), Chilean footballer
- Omar Rodríguez (disambiguation)
- Omar Rosas (born 1993), Mexican footballer
- Omar Rowe (born 1994), English footballer
- Omar Royero (born 1975), Colombian footballer
- Omar Rudberg (born 1998), Swedish singer and actor
- Omar Ruiz Hernández (born 1947), Cuban journalist
- Omar Saavedra Santis (1944–2021), Chilean writer
- Omar Sabino (1932–2011), Brazilian lawyer and politician
- Omar Sabry (1927–2021), Egyptian water polo player
- Omar Sacco (born 1977), Italian bobsledder
- Omar Sachedina (born 1982), Canadian TV journalist
- Omar Sadik (born 2004), Moroccan footballer
- Omar Sahnoun (1955–1980), French footballer
- Omar Saidou Tall (c. 1796–1865), West African political leader
- Omar Sakr (born 1989), Australian writer and poet
- Omar Salado (born 1980), Mexican boxer
- Omar Salah (footballer, born 1998), Egyptian footballer
- Omar Salah (footballer, born 2003), Jordanian footballer
- Omar Salgado (born 1993), American soccer player
- Omar Salim (born 2003), Hungarian taekwondo practitioner
- Omar Samhan (born 1988), American-Egyptian professional basketball player
- Omar Sampedro (born 1985), Spanish footballer
- Omar Samra (born 1978), first Egyptian to climb Mount Everest
- Omar Sandoval (born 1955), Chilean footballer
- Omar Sangare (born 1970), Polish actor, director and theatre professor
- Omar Sani (born 1968), Bangladeshi actor
- Omar Santana (born 1991), Spanish footballer
- Omar Al Saqqaf (1923–1974), Saudi Arabian diplomat and politician
- Omar Segura (born 1981), Mexican racewalker
- Omar Sey (1941–2018), Gambian politician
- Omar Shahin, American-Jordanian imam and activist
- Omar Shama (born 1976), Egyptian screenwriter and film producer
- Omar Sharaf (1925–1995), Egyptian diplomat
- Omar Sharif (1932–2015), Academy Award nominated Egyptian actor
- Omar Sharif Jr. (born 1983), Canadian actor
- Omar Sharmarke (born 1960), former Prime Minister of Somalia
- Omar Sheika (born 1977), American boxer
- Omar Shendi (1915–1992), Egyptian footballer
- Omar Sijarić (born 2001), Montenegrin footballer
- Omar Siles (born 1992), Bolivian footballer
- Omar Simionato (born 1971), Argentine footballer
- Omar Simmonds Pea (born 1981), Panamanian judoka
- Omar Sivori (1935–2005), former international Argentine and Italian football player
- Omar Slaimankhel (born 1992), New Zealand rugby league and rugby union footballer
- Omar Slimi (born 1987), Algerian footballer
- Omar Smith (born 1977), Jamaican gridiron football player
- Omarr Smith (born 1977), American football defensive back for the San Jose SaberCats
- Omar Sneed (born 1976), American basketball player
- Omar Soliman (born 1982), American entrepreneur
- Omar Sosa (born 1965), Cuban musician
- Omar Youssef Souleimane (born 1987), Syrian poet and journalist
- Omar Souleyman (born 1966), Syrian singer
- Omar Sowe (born 2000), Gambian soccer player
- Omar Sowunmi (born 1995), British association football player
- Omar Speights (born 2001), American football player
- Omar Stoutmire (born 1974), American football player
- Omar Strong (born 1990), American basketball player
- Omar Suleiman (disambiguation)
- Omar Sy (born 1978), French actor
- Omar Saidou Tall (c. 1794–1864), Senegalese Islamic scholar and military commander who founded the short-lived Toucouleur Empire
- Omar Tall (soccer) (born 1993), Senegalese-born American soccer player
- Omar Tate (born 1986), American chef, artist and social activist
- Omar Tiani (born 1960s), President of Niger
- Omar Tayara (born 1979), Spanish-born aquathlete and triathlete
- Omar Taylor-Clarke (born 2003), Welsh footballer
- Omar Tebbaka (1929–1998), French boxer
- Omar Tejeda (born 1988), Mexican footballer
- Omar Faruk Tekbilek (born 1951), Turkish virtuoso flutist and multi-instrumentalist
- Omar Thomas (born 1982), American basketball player
- Omar Tiberiades (762–815), Persian astrologer
- Omar Toft (1886–1921), American racing driver
- Omar Torri (born 1982), Italian footballer
- Omar Torrijos (1929–1981), Commander of the Panamanian National Guard and de facto leader of Panama from 1968 to 1981
- Omar Touray (born 1965), President of the ECOWAS Commission since 2022
- Omar Haktab Traoré (born 1998), German footballer
- Omar Trujillo (1977–2022), Mexican footballer
- Omar Turro (born 1965), Cuban Paralympic athlete
- Omar Tyree (born 1969), African-American novelist
- Omar Uresti (born 1968), American professional golfer
- Omar Valencia (born 2002), Panamanian footballer
- Omar van Reenen (born 1996), Namibian human rights activist
- Omar Varela (1957–2022), Uruguayan actor and playwright
- Omar Vásquez (born 1989), Colombian footballer
- Omar Vergara (1943–2018), Argentine fencer
- Omar Visintin (born 1989), Italian snowboarder
- Omar Vizquel (born 1967), Venezuelan former Major League Baseball player and coach
- Omar Vrioni (fl. 1821), leading Ottoman figure in the Greek War of Independence
- Omar Pasha Vrioni II (1839–1928), Albanian prime minister and diplomat
- Omar Wade (born 1990), Senegalese footballer
- Omar Wahrouch (1926–1994), Moroccan singer
- Omar Walcott (born 1965), Venezuelan basketball player
- Omar Wasow (born 1970), American academic and entrepreneur
- Omar Wedderburn, Jamaican football manager
- Omar A. Williams (born 1977), American judge
- Omar Willis (born 1986), Caymanian cricketer
- Omar Wilson, American singer
- Omar Yabroudi (born 1989), Emirati football recruitment head
- Omar M. Yaghi (born 1965), American chemist
- Omar Yahya (born 1992), Qatari footballer
- Omar Yaisien (born 2000), French footballer
- Omar Rabie Yassin (born 1988), Egyptian footballer
- Omar Yousfi (born 1956), Algerian weightlifter
- Omar Yujra (born 1980), Bolivian politician
- Omar Zaani (1895–1961), Lebanese artist
- Omar ben Zamoum (1836–1898), Algerian resistant against French conquest of Algeria
- Omar Zarif (born 1978), Argentine footballer
- Omar Zeineddine (born 1987), Lebanese footballer
- Omar Zepeda (born 1977), Mexican race walker
- Omar Mbwana Zonga, Kenyan politician

==== Fictional characters ====
- Omar Little, in the TV series The Wire

=== Omer ===
- Omer Abdelqader (born 1983), Qatari basketball player
- Omer Adam (born 1993), Israeli singer
- Omer Clyde Aderhold (1899–1969), American academic
- Omer Agvadish (born 2000), Israeli footballer
- Omer Al Mehannah (born 1959), Saudi Arabian football referee
- Omer Arbel (born 1976), Canadian architect and designer
- Omer Atzili (born 1993), Israeli footballer
- Omer Avital (born 1971), Israeli-American jazz bassist, composer and bandleader
- Omer Baes (1889–1929), Belgian footballer
- Omer Mohamed Bakhit (born 1984), Sudanese football midfielder
- Omer Bar-Lev (born 1953), Israeli politician
- Omer Bartov (born 1954), Israeli-American professor
- Omer Beaugendre (1883–1954), French cyclist
- Omer Berck (1895–1926), Belgian fencer
- Omer Beriziky (born 1950), Malagasy politician and diplomat
- Omer Bhatti (born 1985), Norwegian rapper and dancer
- Omer Blaes (born 1961), American astrophysicist
- Omer Blodgett (1917–2017), welder, author and educator
- Omer Bodson (1856–1891), Belgian officer
- Omer Bouchery (1882–1962), French illustrator
- Omer Braeckeveldt (1917–1987), Belgian cyclist
- Omer Brandt (1926–2019), Canadian ice hockey player
- Omer Buaron (born 1992), Israeli footballer
- Omer Buchsenbaum (born 1982), Israeli footballer
- Omer Corteyn (1896–1979), Belgian sprinter
- Omer Côté (1906–1999), Canadian politician
- Omer N. Custer (1873–1942), American politician
- Omer Damari (born 1989), Israeli footballer
- Omer Danino (born 1995), Israeli footballer
- Omer De Bruycker (1906–1989), Belgian cyclist
- Omer Alphonse Demers (1893–1969), Canadian politician
- Omer Demeuldre (1892–1918), French military aviator
- Omer Dostaler (1849–1925), Canadian politician
- Omer Dror (born 1993), Israeli film and TV actor
- Omer Dzonlagic (born 1995), Swiss footballer
- Omer Elmas (born 1968 or 1969), Turkish wrestler
- Omer Fadida (born 1990), Israeli footballer
- Omer Fast (born 1972), Israeli video artist
- Omer Fattah Hussain (born 1948), Iraqi Kurdish politician
- Omer Fedi (born 2000), Israeli songwriter and producer
- Omer Fortuzi (1895–1980), Albanian politician and mayor
- Omer Golan (born 1982), Israeli footballer
- Omer Goldman (born 1989), Israeli actress
- Omer Goldstein (born 1996), Israeli cyclist
- Omer Halilhodžić (born 1963), Bosnian automotive designer
- Omer Hanin (born 1998), Israeli-Portuguese footballer
- Omer L. Hirst (1913–2003), American politician
- Omer Hoffman, Belgian gymnast
- Omer Hussain (born 1984), Scottish cricketer
- Omer Huyse (1898–1985), Belgian cyclist
- Omer Ihsas (born 1958), Sudanese musician and peace activist
- Omer Ismail, Sudanese humanitarian
- Omer Joldić (born 1977), Bosnian football manager
- Omer Kaleshi (1932–2022), Macedonian painter
- Omer M. Kem (1855–1942), American politician
- Omer Khairy (1939–1999), Sudanese modern painter
- Omer Khalifa (born 1956), Sudanese retired middle distance runner
- Omer Korsia (born 2002), Israeli footballer
- Omer LaJeunesse (1908–1994), American football player and coach
- Omer Léger (1931–2023), American-born Canadian politician
- Omer Letorey (1873–1938), French composer
- Omer Mahy (1895–1980), Belgian cyclist
- Omer Meir Wellber (born 1981), Israeli conductor
- Omer Muñoz (born 1966), Venezuelan baseball player and coach
- Omer Nachmani (born 1993), Israeli footballer
- Omer Newsome (1900–1933), American baseball player
- Omer Nishani (1887–1954), Albanian politician
- Omer Perelman Striks (born 1993), Israeli actor
- Omer Peretz (born 1986), Israeli footballer
- Omer Peretz (born 1990), Israeli footballer
- Omer Poos (1902–1976), American judge
- Omer Rains (born 1941), American politician
- Omer Reingold (born 1969), Israeli computer scientist
- Omer Riza (born 1979), British footballer of Turkish origin
- Omer Sarfraz Cheema (born 1969), Pakistani politician
- Omer Senior (born 2003), Israeli footballer
- Omer Shahzad (born 1987), Pakistani model, actor and singer
- Omer Shapira (born 1994), Israeli racing cyclist
- Omer Simeon (1902–1959), American jazz clarinetist
- Omer Smet (1890–1984), Belgian sprinter
- Omer Sohail Zia Butt (born 1980), Pakistani politician
- Omer St. Germain (1877–1949), Canadian politician
- Omer Stewart (1908–1991), American cultural anthropologist
- Omer Stokes Jackson (1884–1940), American politician
- Omer Taverne (1904–1981), Belgian cyclist
- Omer Tchalisher (born 1993), Israeli footballer
- Omer Faruk Tekbilek (born 1951), Turkish musician and composer
- Omer Veillette (1896–1970), Canadian businessman in truck transport
- Omer Vercouteren (born 1929), Belgian wrestler
- Omer Vered (born 1990), Israeli footballer
- Omer Vermeulen (1895–1980), Belgian cyclist
- Omer Verschoore (1888–1931), Belgian cyclist
- Omer Yankelevich (born 1978), Israeli attorney and politician
- Omer Yengo (born 1954), Congolese football referee
- Saint Omer (died 670), or Saint Audomar, bishop of Thérouanne in northern France

=== Ómar ===
- Ómar Ingi Magnússon (born 1997), Icelandic handball player
- Ómar Ragnarsson (born 1940), Icelandic media personality and nature activist
- Ómar Torfason (born 1959), Icelandic footballer
- Friðrik Ómar (born 1981), Icelandic singer representing Iceland in Eurovision Song Contest 2008, vocalist for Eurobandið

=== Ömer ===
- Ömer Fahreddin Türkkan (1868-1948), Ottoman Turkish Lieutenant General
- Lütfi Ömer Akad (1916–2011), Turkish film director
- Besim Ömer Akalın (1862–1940), Turkish physician and politician
- Ömer Akgün (born 1982), Turkish sport shooter
- Ömer Arslan (born 1993), Turkish footballer
- Ömer Asan (born 1961), Turkish folklorist, photographer and writer
- Ömer Aşık (born 1986), Turkish professional basketball player
- Ömer Aşık (archer) (born 1991), Turkish para-archer
- Ömer Aslanoğlu (born 1988), Turkish swimmer
- Ömer Ayçiçek (born 1995), Turkish cross-country skier
- Ömer Aysan Barış (born 1982), Turkish footballer
- Ömer Barutçu (1942–2024), Turkish economist and politician
- Ömer Bayram (born 1991), Turkish footballer
- Ömer Faruk Beyaz (born 2003), Turkish footballer
- Ömer Faruk Tekbilek (born 1951), Turkish musician and composer
- Ömer Nasuhi Bilmen (1883–1971), Muslim scholar
- Ömer Bolat (born 1963), Turkish politician
- Ömer Boncuk (1917–1988), Turkish footballer
- Ömer Büyükaycan (born 1966), Turkish basketball player
- Ömer Çakı (born 2000), Turkish footballer
- Ömer Çatkıç (born 1974), Turkish footballer
- Ömer Çelik (born 1968), Turkish politician and government minister
- Ömer Cerrahoğlu (born 1995), Romanian IMO medalist
- Ömer Çubukçu (born 1980), Turkish freestyle wrestler
- Ömer Diler (c. 1945–2005), Turkish academic
- Ömer Dinçer (born 1956), Turkish politician
- Ömer Döngeloğlu (1968–2020), Turkish writer
- Ömer Elmas (born 1969), Turkish wrestler
- Ömer Erdoğan (born 1977), Turkish-German footballer
- Ömer Ertuğrul Erbakan (born 1965), Turkish general
- Ömer Faruk Gergerlioğlu (born 1965), Turkish doctor, politician and human rights activist
- Ömer Güleryüz (born 1997), Turkish amputee football player
- Ömer Gündüz (born 2001), Dutch footballer
- Ömer Halisdemir (1974–2016), Turkish non-commissioned officer
- Ömer Tuğrul İnançer (1946–2022), Turkish lawyer and Sufi musician
- Ömer İzgi (born 1940), 21st Speaker of the Parliament of Turkey
- Ömer Kahveci (born 1992), Turkish footballer
- Ömer Kalyoncu (born 1950), 10th Prime Minister of Northern Cyprus
- Ömer Kandemir (born 1993), Turkish footballer
- Ömer Kaner (1951–2026), Turkish footballer, coach and manager
- Ömer Karaevli (born 1977), Turkish equestrian
- Ömer Kavur (1944–2005), Turkish film director, producer and screenwriter
- Ömer Ali Kazma (born 1971), Turkish video artist
- Ömer Kemaloğlu (born 1987), Turkish karateka
- Ömer Koç (born 1962), Turkish businessman
- Ömer Besim Koşalay (1898–1956), Turkish middle-distance runner
- Ömer Közen (born 1981), Turkish footballer
- Ömer Kulga (born 1989), Belgian footballer
- Ömer Küyük (1900–2006), Turkish veteran
- Ömer Engin Lütem (1933–2018), Turkish diplomat
- Ömer Lütfi, multiple people
- Ömer Onan (born 1978), Turkish basketball player
- Ömer Özkan (born 1971), Turkish plastic surgeon
- Ömer Sabancı (born 1959), Turkish businessman
- Ömer Ali Şahiner (born 1992), Turkish footballer
- Ömer Sepici (born 1987), Turkish-Dutch footballer
- Ömer Seyfettin (1884–1920), Turkish nationalist writer
- Ömer Şişmanoğlu (born 1989), Turkish footballer
- Ömer Can Sokullu (born 1988), Turkish footballer
- Ömer Faruk Sorak (born 1964), Turkish film director
- Ömer Naci Soykan (c. 1945–2017), Turkish philosopher
- Ömer Tanyeri (1900–1967), Turkish footballer
- Ömer Tokaç (born 2000), Turkish footballer
- Ömer Lütfü Topal (1942–1996), Turkish drug trafficker
- Ömer Toprak (born 1989), Turkish footballer
- Ömer Topraktepe (born 1980), Turkish footballer
- Ömer Uzun (born 2000), Turkish football player
- Ömer Vargı, Turkish film director and producer
- Ömer Yurtseven (born 1998), Turkish basketball player

=== Oumar ===
- Oumar Abakar (born 1979), Chadian professional football player
- Oumar Bagayoko (born 1975), Malian footballer
- Oumar Bakari (born 1980), French footballer
- Oumar Ballo (disambiguation)
- Oumar Barro (born 1974), Burkinabé footballer
- Oumar Ben Salah (born 1964), Ivorian footballer
- Oumar Camara (footballer, born 1992), Mauritanian footballer
- Oumar Camara (footballer, born 1998), Guinean footballer
- Oumar Daou (born 1955), politician and ambassador of Mali to Rwanda
- Oumar Diaby (born 1990), French footballer
- Oumar Diakhité (born 1993), Senegalese footballer
- Oumar Diakité (born 2003), Ivorian footballer
- Oumar Dieng (born 1972), Senegalese footballer
- Oumar Diop (born 1992), Guinean footballer
- Oumar Diouck (born 1994), Senegalese-born Belgian footballer
- Oumar Diouf (born 2003), Senegalese footballer
- Oumar Gonzalez (born 1998), Cameroonian footballer
- Oumar Guindo (born 1969), Malian footballer
- Oumar Kalabane (born 1981), Guinean footballer
- Oumar Kane (born 1992), Senegalese mixed martial artist
- Oumar Kondé (born 1979), Swiss footballer
- Oumar Koné (disambiguation)
- Oumar Loum (born 1973), Senegalese sprinter
- Oumar Mangane (born 1992), Mauritanian footballer
- Oumar Mariko (born 1959), Malian doctor, politician and former student activist
- Oumar N'Diaye (disambiguation)
- Oumar Ngom (born 2002), Mauritanian footballer
- Oumar N'Gom (born 1958), Senegalese wrestler
- Oumar Niasse (born 1990), Senegalese footballer
- Oumar Pona (born 2006), Malian footballer
- Oumar Pouye (born 1988), Senegalese footballer
- Oumar Sako (born 1996), Ivorian footballer
- Oumar Sène (born 1959), Senegalese former football midfielder
- Oumar Sidibé (disambiguation)
- Oumar Sissoko (born 1987), Malian footballer
- Oumar Solet (born 2000), French footballer
- Oumar Tchomogo (born 1978), Beninese football manager and former player
- Oumar Timbo (born 1986), Mauritanian footballer
- Oumar Toure (disambiguation)
- Oumar Traoré (disambiguation)

=== Umar ===
- Abadir Umar Ar-Rida (fl. 13th century), Somali Sheikh and saint of Harar
- Abû 'Umar ibn Sa'îd (died c. 1287), the last ra’îs of Manûrqa (1282–1287)
- Al-Muzaffar Umar (died 1191), Ayyubid prince of Hama and a general of Saladin
- Ghali Umar Na'Abba (born 1964), Nigerian businessman and politician
- Umar Abdulmutallab (born 1986), Nigerian al-Qaeda member known as the Christmas Bomber
- Malik Umar Hayat Khan (1875–1944), soldier of the Indian Empire, one of the largest landholders in the Punjab, and an elected member of the Council of the State of India
- Mifta al-Usta Umar (1935–2010), former Head of State of Libya from 15 February 1984 to 7 October 1990
- Sanjar Umarov (born 1956), prominent Uzbek politician and businessman
- Sitta Umaru Turay (born 1978), Sierra Leonean journalist and member of the editorial Board of the Sierra Express newspaper
- Umar Abdul-Razak (born 1975), Ghanaian politician
- Umar Akmal, (born 1990) Pakistani cricketer
- Umar Al-Qadri, Pakistani Irish Muslim scholar
- Umar Amin (born 1989), Pakistani cricketer
- Umar Apong (1940–2023), Bruneian police commissioner
- Umar Arteh Ghalib (1930–2020), prominent Somali politician and a former prime minister of Somalia
- Umar Ata Bandial (born 1958), Pakistani judge
- Umar Bakkalcha (1953?—1980), Ethiopian nationalist of Oromo people
- Umar Bala Mohammed (born 1998), Nigerian footballer
- Umar Bashiru (born 1997), Ghanaian footballer
- Umar Bhatti (born 1984), Pakistani-born Canadian cricketer
- Umar bin Hafiz (born 1963), Yemeni Sunni Islamic scholar
- Umar Bin Hassan (born 1948), American poet and recording artist
- Umar Bin Muhammad Daudpota (1896–1958), researcher, historian, linguist and scholar
- Umar Bologi II (born 1982), Etsu Patigi
- Umar Buba Bindir (born 1961), Nigerian agricultural engineer
- Umar Cheema (born 1978), Pakistani journalist
- Umar Daraz Khallil, Pakistani actor
- Umar Dimayev (1908–1972), Chechen musician
- Umar Dzhabrailov (born 1958), Russian politician
- Umar Edelkhanov (born 1963), Russian weightlifter
- Umar Eshmurodov (born 1992), Uzbekistani footballer
- Umar Farooq (born 1979), former Danish cricketer
- Umar Farouk Ahmed, military administrator of Cross River State, Nigeria
- Umar Farouk Osman (born 1998), Ghanaian footballer
- Umar Faruq Abd-Allah (born 1948), American Islamic scholar
- Umar Garba (born 1959), Nigerian academic
- Umar Ghalib (1930–2020), Somalian politician
- Umar Gombe (born 1983), Nigerian actor
- Umar Gul, (born 1984), Pakistani former cricketer
- Umar ibn Hafsun (850–917), leader of rebel forces in the Caliphate of Córdoba
- Umar ibn Sa'ad (c. 620–680), one of the leaders of the troops who killed the prophet Muhammad's grandson Husayn ibn Ali in the Battle of Karbala in 680
- Umar Israilov (1982–2009), Chechen dissident assassinated in Vienna
- Umar Jauro Audi (1967–2020), Nigerian politician
- Umar Javed (born 1983), Pakistani cricketer
- Umar Johnson (born 1974), American Pan-Africanist
- Umar Kamani (born 1988), Indian fashion retailer and businessman
- Umar Karsanov (born 1981), Russian footballer
- Umar Kayam (1932–2002), Indonesian sociologist
- Umar Khalid (born 1987), Indian political activist
- Umar Khan (disambiguation)
- Umar Ali Khan, Indian politician
- Umar Khayam Hameed (born 1989), British Paralympic athlete
- Umar Kiyani (born 1995), Pakistani cricketer
- Umar Kremlev (born 1982), Russian sports official
- Umar Krupp (born 1998), Ghanaian actor
- Umar Lubis (born 1973), Indonesian actor
- Umar Markhiyev (born 1969), Indian footballer and coach
- Umar Muhammad (born 1975), American football player
- Umar Muhayshi (1941–1984), Libyan politician
- Umar Mustafa al-Muntasir (1939–2001), prime minister of Libya from 1 March 1987 to 7 October 1990 and foreign minister from 1992 to 2000
- Umar Namadi (born 1963), Nigerian politician
- Umar Nawaz (footballer) (born 2008), Pakistani footballer
- Umar Nazir Mir (born 1993), Indian cricketer
- Umar Nissar (born 1993), Indian cricketer
- Umar Nurmagomedov (born 1996), Russian mixed martial artist
- Umar Osman (born 2003), Malaysian sprinter
- Umar Pate (born 1964), vice-chancellor of Federal University Kashere
- Umar Patek (born 1970), Indonesian involved in 2002 Bali Bombing
- Umar Ramle (born 1996), Singaporean footballer
- Umar Rida Kahhala (1905–1987), Syrian historian
- Umar Sadiq (born 1997), Nigerian footballer
- Umar Saif (born 1979), Pakistani computer scientist and entrepreneur
- Umar Salamov (born 1994), Russian boxer
- Umar Sani (born 1963), Nigerian media advisor
- Umar Semata (born 1987), Ugandan kickboxer
- Umar Siddiq (born 1992), Pakistani cricketer
- Umar Sulaiman Al-Ashqar (1940–2012), Jordanian Muslim scholar and Salafist preacher
- Umar Usman Dukku, Nigerian politician
- Umar Usman Kadafur (born 1976), Nigerian politician
- Umar Waheed (born 1994), Pakistani cricketer
- Umar Wirahadikusumah (1924–2003), Vice-President of Indonesia from 1983 to 1988
- Umar Zahir (born 1963), Maldivian singer
- Umar Zahir (politician) (1936–2021), Maldivian politician
- Umar Zango (born 1994), Nigerian footballer

=== Umaru ===
- Umaru Abdullahi (born 1939), Nigerian judge
- Umaru Bago Tafida (born 1954), ruler of Lapai in Niger State, Nigeria
- Umaru Bangura (born 1987), Sierra Leonean international footballer
- Umaru bin Ali (1824–1891), Nigerian traditional ruler
- Umaru Dahiru (born 1952), Nigerian politician
- Umaru Dikko (1936–2014), Nigerian politician
- Umaru Gomwalk (died 2019), Nigerian academic
- Umaru Mohammed (died 1980), Military Governor of North Western State, Nigeria
- Umaru Mutallab (born 1939), played a major role in introducing Islamic banking into Nigeria
- Umaru Nagwamatse (1806–1870), Kontagora Emirate founder
- Umaru Pulavar (1642–1703), Tamil Muslim poet
- Umaru Rahman (born 1982), Sierra Leonean international footballer
- Umaru Sanda Amadu (born 1987), Ghanaian broadcast journalist
- Umaru Sanda Ndayako (1937–2003), 12th Etsu Nupe, Nigeria
- Umaru Shehu (1930–2020), Nigerian academic
- Umaru Tanko Al-Makura (born 1952), Nigerian politician and businessman
- Umaru Yar'Adua (1951–2010), the 2nd President of Nigeria's Fourth Republic

=== Umer ===
- Umer Adamanov (1916–1943), Crimean Tatar soldier who became a partisan detachment leader in the Polish resistance
- Umer Aslam Awan, Pakistani politician
- Umer Chapra (1933–2026), Pakistani-Saudi economist
- Umer Khan (cricketer) (born 1999), Pakistani cricketer
- Umer Rashid (1976–2002), English first-class cricketer
- Umer Shareef (1955–2021), Pakistani stand-up comedian, stage, film and television actor, writer, director and producer
- Umer Tanveer (born 1982), Pakistani politician

=== Other ===
- Omarion (born 1984), American R&B singer, actor, songwriter, record producer, dancer
- Omarr Norman-Lott (born 2002), American football player
- Omarr Smith (born 1977), American football defensive back for the San Jose SaberCats
- Oumarou Ganda (1935–1981), Nigerian director and actor
- Umur the Lion (died 1348), the Turkish Emir of Aydin from 1336 to 1344
- Ymär Sali (1876–1951), Tatar entrepreneur in Finland
- Ymär Daher (1910–1999), Tatar cultural worker in Finland

== Surname ==
=== Omar ===
- Adil Omar (born 1991), Pakistani hip-hop artist
- Ayesha Omar (born 1981), Pakistani actress and singer
- Don Omar (born 1978), Puerto Rican rapper (full name "William Omar Landrón Rivera")
- Elyas Omar (1936–2018), third Mayor of Kuala Lumpur, Malaysia
- Hairuddin Omar (born 1979), Malaysian professional footballer
- Ilhan Omar (born 1981), Somali-American U.S. Representative for Minnesota's 5th congressional district
- Mahmoud Abdel Salam Omar (born 1936/37), Egyptian businessman
- Meira Omar (born 1993), Afghan-Swedish singer
- Mohammed Omar (1960–2013), Taliban leader of Afghanistan
- Mohd Hamzani Omar (born 1978), Malaysian footballer
- Nano Omar (born 1986), Swedish singer-songwriter

=== Omaar ===
- Mohamed Abdullahi Omaar (born 1952), Somali diplomat and politician
- Rageh Omaar (born 1967), Somali journalist and writer

=== Omer, Ömer ===
- Abdisalam Omer (born 1954/55), Somali economist and politician
- Aihan Omer (born 1960), Romanian handball coach
- Atila Omer, American entrepreneur, co-founder of Collaborative Fusion

=== Oumar / Oumarou ===
- Mamane Oumarou (born 1946), Nigerian political figure who served two brief periods as prime minister of Niger during the 1980s

=== Umar ===
- Mohammad Umar (disambiguation)
- Teuku Umar (1854–1899), leader of Acehnese during the Aceh War
- Yahya ibn Umar (died 864), Alid who rebelled against the Abbasid Caliphate

=== Omarova ===
- Gulshat Omarova (born 1968), Kazakh film director, actress and screenwriter

== See also ==
- Omar (disambiguation)
