= Akel =

Akel is a surname. Notable people with the surname include:

- Emad Akel (1965–1993), Hamas military commander
- Friedrich Akel (1871–1941), Estonian diplomat and politician
- Mohamed Akel (born 1993), Israeli football player
- Omar al-Akel (born 1980), Syrian football player

== Politics ==
- Progressive Party of Working People (Ανορθωτικό Κόμμα Εργαζόμενου Λαού), a communist political party in Cyprus
