= Muhammad Omar =

Muhammad Omar (Arabic: محمد عمر), and other spellings such as Mohamed Omer, may refer to the following people:

== Sportspeople ==
- Muhammad Umar (wrestler) (born 1975), Pakistani wrestler
- Mohammad Omar (footballer, born 1976), Emirati footballer
- Mohammed Omar (footballer, born 1983), Qatari footballer
- Muhammad Omar (footballer, born 1990), Pakistani footballer
- Mohamed Omar (footballer, born 1999), Somali footballer

== Politicians ==
- Mohamed Salih Omer (1934–1969), Sudanese politician
- Mohammad Iqbal Omar (born 1972), Iraqi politician
- Mohammad Omar (Afghan governor) (died 2010), Governor of Kunduz Province, Afghanistan
- Mullah Omar (died 2013), founder and former leader of the Taliban
- Mohamed Omer (Eritrean politician), interim foreign minister of Eritrea
- Mohammad Abdullahi Omar, Somali politician
- Mohammad Farid Omar, Afghan Taliban politician
- Muhammad Zubair Umar, Pakistani politician

== Other people ==
- Mohammad Omar (musician) (1905–1980), Afghan musician and Rubab virtuoso
- Mohamed Omar (born 1976), Swedish poet who changed his name to Eddie Råbock in 2017
- Mohammed Omer (journalist) (born 1984), Palestinian journalist
- Mohamed Omar (mathematician), Egyptian-Canadian mathematician working in the United States

== See also ==
- Muhammad Umar (disambiguation)
- Muhammad Umar Memon (1939–2008), Pakistani literary scholar
- Mohammad Omar Daudzai (born 1957), Afghan politician
- Mohamed Omar Hagi Mohamoud (born 1981), Somali diplomat
- Mohammad Omar Shishani (born 1989), Jordanian footballer
- Mohammed Omar Abdel-Rahman, Egyptian extrajudicial prisoner of the US
- Mohamed Omar Arte, Somali politician
- Omar Mohamed Omar (1970–2008), Somali basketball player
- Amin Omar (born 1985), Egyptian football referee
- Daud Mohamed Omar, Somali politician
