= El Bahraoui =

El Bahraoui is a surname of Moroccan origin. Notable people with the surname include:

- Brahim El Bahraoui (born 1992), Moroccan footballer
- Hajar El Bahraoui (born 1996), Spanish-Moroccan actress, model and activist. Known professionally as Hajar Brown
- Manal El-Bahraoui (born 1994), Moroccan-Bahraini athlete
- Omar El Bahraoui, Moroccan politician and former mayor of Rabat (2003–2009)

== See also ==
- Sidi Allal El Bahraoui, a town in Khémisset Province, Rabat-Salé-Kénitra, Morocco
