= Conscription in Sudan =

Conscription in Sudan was established in 1972 but only strictly enforced from 1992 onward. Service durations vary by education level, with conscription extending to men aged 18 to 45 and sometimes beyond. The government has employed forced recruitment, particularly targeting ethnic minorities and students, leading to widespread evasion, harsh punishments, and reports of abuse in training camps. During the ongoing civil war, mass mobilisations have been initiated by both the Sudanese Armed Forces and Rapid Support Forces, with concerns over underage recruitment.

== Establishment ==
Mandatory national military service was established in 1972 during Gaafar Nimeiry presidency, but have been poorly enforced until 1992 during the Kizan Era.

The National Service Act of 1992, article 7, stipulate that "every Sudanese who completed eighteen years and did not exceed thirty three years of age shall submit to the imposition of National Service". The military service lasts for 12 months for those who have graduated from universities and colleges, 18 months for high school graduates, and 24 months for those without these qualifications. Under national conscription, all individuals are eligible for service starting at age 18, but they may defer their service by paying a fine, or through student registration and deferments until graduations, although this was suspended between 1996 and 1998.

The age limit was raised to 45 years as part of the Military Service Act of 2013, which also gave the Ministry of Defence the power to call upon individual under 60 years old to serve in the army.

The 1992 and 2013 Act allowed authorised individuals to issue further exempts, although affluent riverine Arab families often able to avoid service through bribery and corruption. People who are medically unfit being exempted. Conscription also extended to women.

After the 2018 Sudanese revolution and the 2019 coup d'état, the mandatory national military service became poorly enforced with more focus on mandatory civil service for graduates.

== Aim ==
According to the National Service Act of 1992, article 4, the National Service seeks to prepare individuals for military and social responsibilities by fostering discipline, cooperation, and leadership while promoting self-confidence and readiness for sacrifice. It aims to build strong attachment to the community and patriotism, overcoming selfishness and fanaticism. Additionally, it focuses on ensuring physical fitness and developing skills through education and training for both military and civilian roles.

== Forced conscription ==
The 1992 and 2013 Act allowed for forceful conscription and call-ups. The 1992 law prohibits those called for military service from pursuing education, employment, or leaving the country, and restricts graduation and professional licensing until service requirements are met.

Military conscription was intense between 1995 and 1998 and early 2002 during the Second Sudanese Civil War, due to insufficient voluntary enlistment. The government forced recruitment since 1995, press gang and apprehending men in public spaces and establishing control posts in Khartoum, particularly in impoverished areas. In 1997, a general mobilisation led to the recruitment of thousands of students, with secondary school students receiving military training before joining the armed forces. This led to mass immigration for youth from Sudan.

Forced conscription was widespread in the Darfur, Kordofan, and Blue Nile regions, particularly targeting non-Arab men from ethnic minorities familiar with the local terrain and military tactics. This practice has also occurred in Khartoum since 1989, focusing on non-Arab men.

Despite official recruitment age limits, underage conscription has been widespread, including reports of boys as young as 12 being forcibly recruited, even from vulnerable groups like street children. Some recruits were forced to joined the (al-Dbabeen Arabic: الدبابين) and Popular Defence Forces, a paramilitary force controlled by the ruling National Islamic Front.

== Conscription evasion punishment ==
The National Service Act of 1992 prescribes imprisonment up to three years, fines, or both for those who violate its provisions. Specifically, individuals who avoid recruitment, use deceit, or harm themselves to evade service face two to three years in prison. Objection to conscription is not legally recognised.

Captured evaders and deserters face severe punishments such as detention, torture, and possible deployment to conflict zones. Punishments vary by commanders and can be extreme, including execution; administrative actions against service objectors include job suspension, home raids, legal prosecution, public naming, and charges related to national security.

The 2013 Act adds fines and up to six months imprisonment for refusing reserve service without valid reasons, and three years imprisonment for crimes committed during service. Punishments for evasion, including fines, imprisonment, or forced conscription, are inconsistently enforced along ethnic lines. Measures against evaders reportedly include job suspension or termination, raids, legal action, public naming, and prosecution for national security offences.

Individuals who evaded military service and were absent from Sudan for a long time may face punishment upon return. Treatment varies by connections and ethnicity, as connected individuals might pay fines, while others, particularly non-Arabs or those from peripheral regions, could be jailed. Those identified as security threats or unable to prove service are at higher risk of detention.

Military service evasion has sometimes been exploited as a pretext to target individuals of security interest. Individuals with political profile who were absent from Sudan for a long time face punishment upon return.

== Conditions during conscription ==
On 2 April 1998, 74 students fleeing Al 'Aylafun military camp to visit family during Eid al-Adha were shot, with 55 drowned crossing the Nile. Protests against harsh training and abuse occurred in multiple camps in 2006. In 2012, recruits were hanged in Hantoub and shot in Nyala after protesting mistreatment and poor food; other deaths occurred in Wad Madani. In 2014, riots in Western Kordofan over degrading treatment led to police tear gas intervention.

Recruits face indoctrination promoting racial and religious violence and fight alongside the army and Popular Defence Forces. Disease outbreaks are common and worsened by limited medical care.

== Sudanese civil war ==
During the Sudanese civil war (2023–present) between the Sudanese Armed Forces (SAF) and Rapid Support Forces (RSF), in June 2023, General Abdel Fattah al-Burhan, the Commander-in-Chief of the SAF, initiated a mass mobilisation dubbed the Popular Resistance, uniting people across political affiliations in "defence of national dignity," and to protect themselves and their property. The SAF oversees mobilisation and readiness camps. It is voluntary to join.

Sky News Arabia reported on the conscription of hundreds of children between the age of 12 and 14 at a military camp near Shendi, River Nile State.

The RSF, primarily composed of individuals from Darfur, responded by increasing their recruitment efforts.
