= Omar Ahmed Fadlallah =

Sudanese writer

Omar Fadlallah
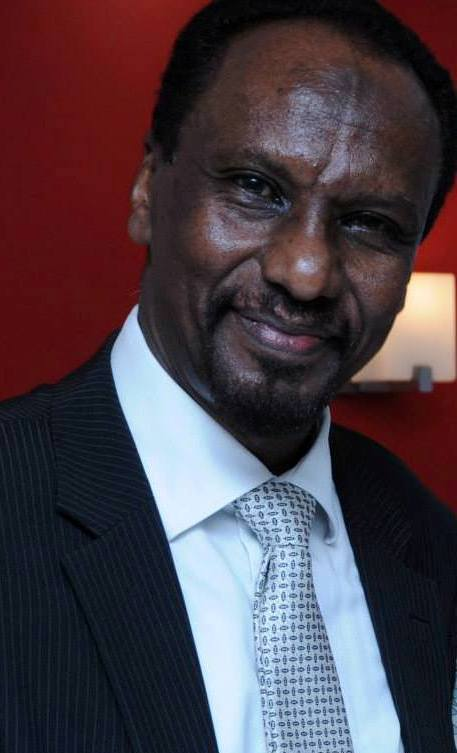
- Omar Ahmed Fadlallah in 2013
- Born: Omer Ahmed Fadlallah Al-Fahal; 1 January 1956 (age 70); Al-Ailafoun, Sudan
- Education: University of Khartoum, King Abdulaziz University in Jeddah
- Occupations: Writer, novelist, poet, and IT project expert

Omer Ahmed Fadlallah Al-Fahal (born 1956) (Arabic: عمر فضل الله الفحل) is a Sudanese writer, poet, and expert in e-government systems and projects. He holds a PhD in computer science, specializing in information systems.

== Biography ==
Fadlallah was born in the land of Al-Ailfoun in the state of Khartoum on January 1, 1956, on the Blue Nile, specifically east of the Blue Nile and south of Soba in the east. He grew up in the middle of family of religion and knowledge. His father used to narrate poetry and narrated on the authority of Wad Al-Radhi, who had a kinship between him and them. In addition, he has eight brothers. He memorized the Qur'an and poetry when he was young and passed the secondary certificate exams from the homes of Khartoum. He was among the top ten.

Fadlallah went on to attend the University of Khartoum for one year, after which he left due to the lack of stability in his studies. He traveled to Saudi Arabia and attended King Abdulaziz University in Jeddah, from which he obtained a bachelor's degree in media in 1981. He then traveled to the United States of America, where he earned a master's degree and a doctorate in computer science, specializing in information systems. After graduating, he returned to work in Saudi Arabia until 1991.

Fadlallah later returned to Sudan, where he would become a founder of the Khartoum Center for Strategic Studies and the National Center for Information in Sudan. Subsequently, he moved to the United Arab Emirates, where he remained until 2018, and then to the United States of America.

== Education ==
Omar started memorizing the Qur'an like his peers in Al-Ailifoun in the retreat of Al-Faki Al-Amin and Dr. Abu Saleh, and then the primary at that time in Al-Alifoun Primary, then Central, High School in Bahri Governmental, Al-Jili High School, he sat in Sudan to get his certificate exam in the old houses of Khartoum, and he has one of the first Sudanese secondary certificates. Omar joined University of Khartoum, his major was Economics but he left it after a year because of instability, however, he received a scholarship at King Abdulaziz University in Jeddah his major was Arts of Media and Communication Sciences in 1976, then graduated in 1981 with a bachelor's degree, after he traveled to the United States of America, he got his master's and doctorate degree in 1987 at University of California, Los Angeles.

== Career ==
He started working as a technical documentation specialist at Leighton Company in Saudi Arabia until 1990, then returned to Sudan to work as a Professor at Sudanese universities and founder of research and studies institutions and centers until 1999.

He moved to work in the United Arab Emirates in the former Department of Public Works in Abu Dhabi, during which he managed documentation of engineering systems and applications. Omar Fadlallah worked as an active member in the management of the Software development life cycle using the agile methodology or the so-called agile methodology. He worked as an active member in a number of projects such as: Buildings Knowledge Base System, Building Permits Management System, CAD Engineering and Design Applications, Building Industry Information System, Commercial Licensing System, Facilities Management and Maintenance System, Infrastructure Management and Maintenance System, Land Management System, Oracle Financial System, Project Management Applications, Public health management system, 3D visualization and presentation system, website project, registration system, value engineering information system, and decision support system. In addition, Omar worked as an active member in a number of management information systems projects, including: Sheikh Zayed Grand Mosque Abu Dhabi, Zayed Center for studies and research, Professor of Al Jazeera, Emirates Palace Hotel, working on restructuring the Information Technology Department at the Emirates Heritage Club and hiring workers in the field of information technology. He worked in the department until 2004 as an IT project manager.

At the beginning of 2005, Abu Dhabi City Municipality and Al Ain Municipality, Department of Works, and the Department of Agriculture and Animal Production in Al Ain merged into one department under the name Department of Municipalities and Agriculture. After that, Omar worked as an information systems consultant in the parent Emirates Investment Company from 2006 to 2007, and then started working in 2007 with C4 Advanced Solutions, the subsidiary company of the Emirates Investment Advanced Company as an information systems consultant to create and write work policies in According to the standards of Infrastructure Library TIL Infrastructure, Documentation for Internal Operations Procedures and SOP, Creation of IT Policy and ICT Security Policy, Creation and Procedure of Backup Plans, Creation of Local Procedures for ERP Servers for SAP, Technical Documentation for Proactive Maintenance for SQL Server database servers, Oracle servers, Voiceover Internet devices, as well as technical documents for the intranet. Internet, local area network, data centers, physical networks, computers, SAN storage devices and create training documents, and created in coordination with designers, programmers, engineers, developers and technical staff to create graphic images, flowcharts and diagrams to be included in the documentation and create the necessary technical documents for the provision of IT services. He worked for the company until 2018, after which he devoted himself to fiction, technical projects and freelance work.

== Awards ==
In February 2018, Fadlallah received the second place al-Tayeb Salih Award for Creative Writing for his novel Tashriqat ul-Maghribi.

In October 2018, Fadlallah received the Katara Prize for Arabic Novel for his Arabic novel Anfas Solaiha.

Both Tashriqat ul-Maghribi and Anfas Solaiha belong to the same knowledge narrative project, the Documentary Knowledge Novel Series for the History of Sudan.

== His works ==
=== Literary works ===
Documentary knowledge novel series of the history of Sudan
Publishing House	Number of pages	year of publishing	Novel name
Dar al-yasmeen for publishing and distribution	300 page	2014	Spectra of the other universe
Madarat	212 page	2016	nilophobia
Madarat	239 page	2017	Anfas Saliha
Dar al-Bashir for culture and science	200 page	2018	Tashriqat ul-Maghribi
Dar al-Bashir for culture and science	192 page	2020	Aisha's vision
Dar al-Bashir for culture and science	272 page	2021	waiting for the train
Dar Nahdet for printing, publishing and distribution in Egypt	288 page	2013	The king's Translator

General Books
Publishing House	Investigation	Number of pages	Writer	Year of publishing	Novel name
Dar Nahdet for printing, publishing and distribution	-	157pages	Dr. Omar Ahmed Fadalallah al-Fahal	2013	Water war on the banks of the nile, an Israeli dream came true
Dar photographers publishing	Dr. Omar Ahmed Fadlallah al-Fahal	582 pages	Al-Fahal Al-Faki	2015	History and origins of the Arabs in Sudan

Poetry Books
Type of poem	Year	Name of publish house
poetry collection	1990	Zaman al-Nada and al-Nawar
poetry collection	2009	Zaman al-Nawa and al-Nawah

== Books translated to other languages ==
Many of Fadlallah's works have been translated into other languages, including his novel, Solaiha's Breath, which won the Al-Katara award in the category of novels published in October 2018. Other translated works include the novels Tashriqat ul-Maghribi and Aisha's Vision, which have been translated into English. The King's Translator, The Spectra of the Universe, and Nelophobia were also translated into English and are currently being translated into French.
