= Shane Davis (astrophysicist) =

American astrophysicist

- Education: Carnegie Mellon University (B.S.); University of California, Santa Barbara (Ph.D.)
- Awards: Sloan Research Fellowship (2015)
- Scientific career
- Fields: Astrophysics
- Workplaces: Canadian Institute for Theoretical Astrophysics; University of Virginia
- Thesis: Using black hole x-ray binaries as laboratories for probing accretion disk theory in strong gravity. (2006)
- Doctoral advisor: Omer Blaes

Shane W. Davis is an American astrophysicist. He is an assistant professor in the department of astronomy at the University of Virginia. Davis was a senior research associate at the Canadian Institute for Theoretical Astrophysics. He was awarded a Sloan Research Fellowship in 2015.

== Education ==
Davis completed a B.S. in physics with university honors and was inducted into Phi Beta Kappa and Phi Kappa Phi at Carnegie Mellon University in 2000. He earned a Ph.D. in physics from University of California, Santa Barbara in 2006. His doctoral advisor was Omer Blaes. His dissertation was titled Using black hole x-ray binaries as laboratories for probing accretion disk theory in strong gravity. He was a postdoctoral fellow in the school of natural sciences at the Institute for Advanced Study from September 2006 to August 2010. He was a postdoctoral fellow at the Canadian Institute for Theoretical Astrophysics (CITA) from September 2010 to August 2012.

== Career ==
Davis was a senior research associate at the Canadian Institute for Theoretical Astrophysics from September 2012 to July 2014. He joined the department of astronomy at University of Virginia in August 2014 as an assistant professor.

== Awards and honors ==
In 2015, Davis was awarded a Sloan Research Fellowship.
