= Ömer Lütfi =

Ömer Lütfi or Ömer Lütfü may refer to the following people:

- Ömer Lütfi Yasan (1878–1956), Ottoman military officer and Turkish politician
- Ömer Lütfi Argeşo (1879–1942), Ottoman military officer and Turkish politician
- Ömer Lütfi Akad (1916–2011), Turkish film director
- Ömer Lütfü Topal (1942–1996), Turkish businessman involved in the Susurluk scandal
