= Omar Simionato =

Argentine footballer

Personal information
- Full name: Alejandro Omar Simionato
- Date of birth: 5 August 1971 (age 55)
- Place of birth: Mercedes, Buenos Aires, Argentina
- Height: 1.86 m (6 ft 1 in)
- Position: Defender

Youth career
- San Lorenzo

Senior career*
Years	Team	Apps	(Gls)
1991–1994	San Lorenzo	84	(4)
1994–1996	Lanús	68	(8)
1996–1998	Las Palmas	45	(6)
1998–2000	Racing Club	8	(0)
1999	→ Universidad Católica (loan)	9	(0)
Total		214	(18)
- * Club domestic league appearances and goals

Alejandro Omar Simionato (born 5 August 1971 in Mercedes, Buenos Aires) is a retired Argentine football player who played for a number of clubs both in Argentina and Europe, including San Lorenzo de Almagro, Lanús and UD Las Palmas.

== Teams ==
- (Argentina) San Lorenzo 1991–1994
- (Argentina) Lanús 1994–1996
- (Spain) Las Palmas 1996–1998
- (Argentina) Racing 1998
- (Chile) Universidad Católica 1999
- (Argentina) Racing 1999–2000
