= Omar Borkan Al Gala =

Iraqi model

Omar Borkan Al Gala عمر بركان الغلا
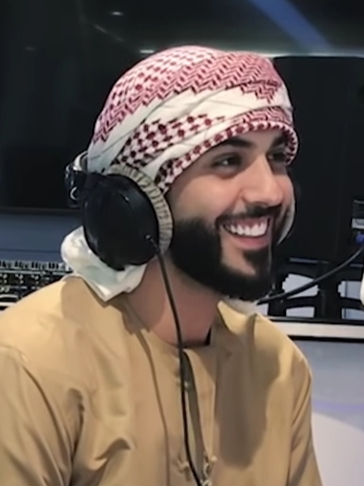
- Al Gala in 2018
- Born: Baghdad , Iraq
- Occupations: Model, internet celebrity

Omar Borkan Al Gala (Arabic: عمر بركان الغلا) is an Iraqi model and internet celebrity. He first picked up infamy in 2013 due to online reports stating that he was supposedly deported from Saudi Arabia for "being too sexy", which was later debunked as a hoax.

== International reputation and notoriety ==
Omar Borkan Al Gala became notorious in 2013 when media coverage claimed that he had been deported from the country for being "too handsome"; however, this was not the case. The incident occurred during the Jandriyah Cultural Festival in Riyadh, during which he and two other male models worked on a promotion stand. In a January 2015 interview, Al Gala said that at the festival, some girls recognized him from some modelling he had done, and they gathered for autographs and photos, after which the crowd around them grew. Al Gala said that "the religion police didn't like it," and "they came and they asked me politely to leave the festival."

According to a police officer, "The members of the Commission for the Promotion of Virtue and Prevention of Vices feared that female visitors would fall in love with them."

Later, the delegation of Saudi Arabia issued a statement clarifying that Borkan and the other two models were never asked to leave the country, only the festival, and that had nothing to do with being "too handsome," but was related to the unexpected presence of women on the stand of men, something that challenged the country's custom regarding having women not to interact with men who are not of their family. They also stated that Al Gala had performed "indecent" dances at the event.

The incident became one of the most viral stories on the internet after photographs of Al Gala were disseminated through social media, and he was invited to give interviews on various television programs and appeared on various magazine covers, being presented by the international press as "the most handsome (Arab) man in the world".

== Personal life ==
Al Gala was born in Baghdad, Iraq, but was raised in Dubai, in the United Arab Emirates. He was a student at the Abu Obaida Ahjarah Public School in Dubai, and was also a student of the Faculty Executive Hotels International Institute of Hotel Management, where he studied hotel management. In 2015, he married Yasmin Oweidah, with whom he has a son. They separated in 2018. At some point following his gain in notoriety in 2013, he relocated to Vancouver.
