= Omar Pirrera =

Italian poet (1932–2021)

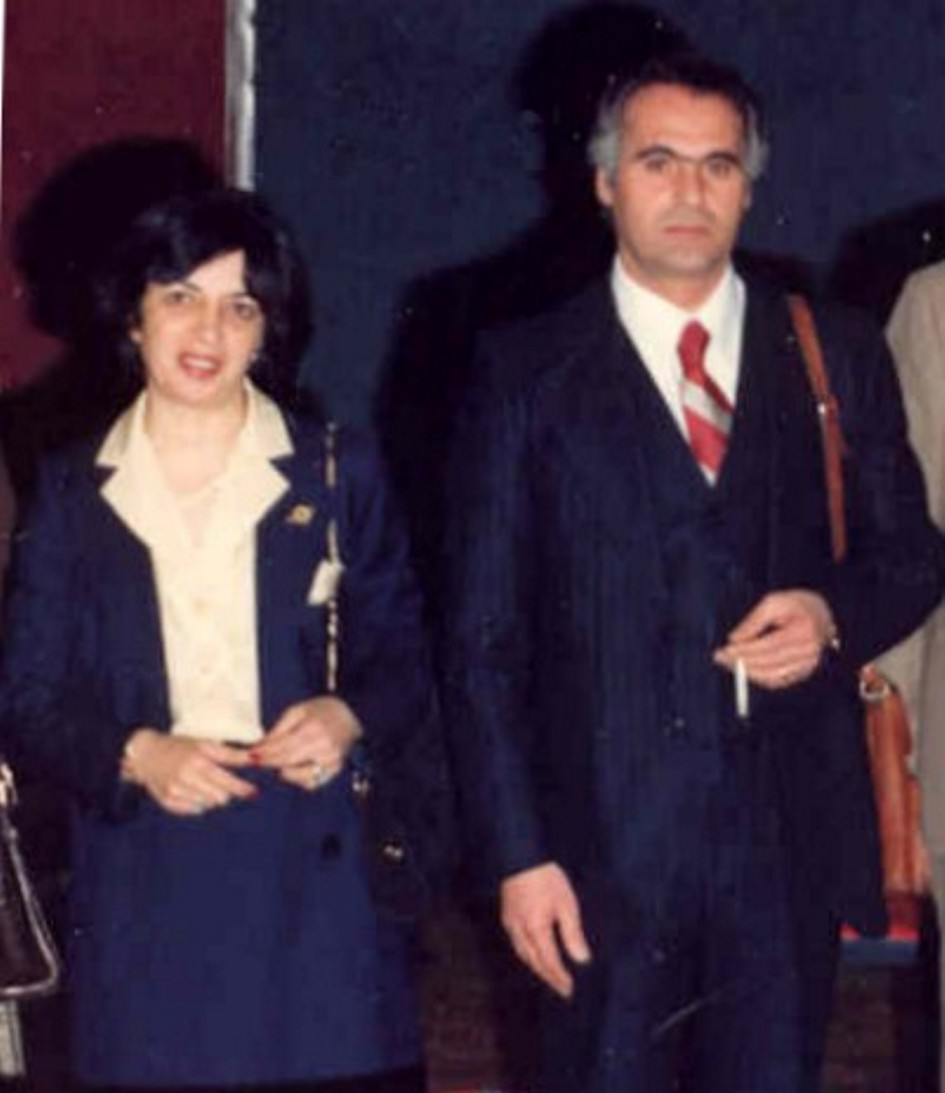
Picture of Omar Pirrera

Carmelo Pirrera, pen name Omar Pirrera (10 December 1932 – 23 January 2021) was an Italian poet, writer, and essayist.

He contracted COVID-19 during the COVID-19 pandemic in Italy while living in a retirement home. He died of the virus in Vallo della Lucania in January 2021, at the age of 88.

== Works ==
=== Poems ===
- Deserto e poesia
- Cosmo e poesia
- Mistero e poesia
- Morire con il Sole
- Credi per non morire prima di morire

=== Novels ===
- Colloqui con Parmenide
- La leggenda di Calafato parte I, II e III

=== Essays and other writings ===
- Futurismo e dintorni
- Sul Dialogus de oratoribus di Tacito
- Storia della ricerca scientifica
- Antologia dei Poeti preferiti
- La consapevolezza dell'Essere
- Pietro Giordani uno dei tanti incompresi
- Gelone: un grande siciliano
- Cartesio e la nascita della geometria analitica
- In Federico II l'Ulisse dantesco
- Come dal finito nasce l'infinito
- Giuliano l'Apostata: un ingenuo sognatore
- Origini del conflitto tra Papato e Impero
- Krishna e le origini del Cristianesimo
- Come nasce il “volgare”
- Paganesimo e Cristianesimo
- Socrate: l'interfaccia di Platone
- Socrate decise di morire
- Leopardi e la gloria
- Antonio Ranieri: un altro dimenticato
- Empedocle d'Agrigento: un incompreso
- Giulio Cesare deve morire
- Re Manfredi contro l'arroganza papale
- La morte del pudore
- Sul ritratto di Dorian Gray
- La bellezza
- La donna
- I combattenti
- Esterofili
- La medicina in Magna Graecia ed a Velia
- Il pitagorismo
- I geroglici
- Leopardi e i libri
- Catastrofi finali
- Il Tiranno
