= Omar Mohamed El-Sayed Fikri =

Egyptian writer and astronomer,

- Born: 1965 (age 60–61); Giza, Egypt
- Occupations: Writer and astronomer
- Notable work: The Rock, A Special Sky

Omar Mohamed El-Sayed Fikri (Arabic: عمر محمد السيد فكري) is an Egyptian writer and astronomer, born in Giza Governorate in 1965. He received a bachelor's degree in astronomy from the Faculty of Science at Cairo University in 1987, and a master's degree in astronomy from the Faculty of Science at Cairo University in 1992, then a PhD in astrophysics from the Faculty of Science at the University of Alexandria in 2006. Fikri worked at the Halwan Observatory, then at the Kuwait Planetarium Science Center (PSC). He is currently the head of the Planetarium Theater Department at the Bibliotheca Alexandrina.

He is a member of the Arab Union for Astronomy and Space Sciences, the International Federation of Planetariums, and Vice President of the Egyptian Society of Astronomy. He has participated in numerous scientific conferences and published literary and scientific articles in a number of local and Arab journals and newspapers. These include the monthly Galaxy Magazine (Arabic: Al-Majarra), which is issued by the Kuwait Scientific Club, and the Science Planet magazine (Arabic: kawkab aleilm), which is issued every quarter by the Bibliotheca Alexandria. He has also published some literature, ranging from adult literature to children's literature.

== Career ==
After graduating from the Faculty of Science, Fikri was appointed as a teaching assistant and researcher at the Egyptian National Research Institute of Astronomy and Geophysics (Halwan Observatory). Then he worked as a coordinator for scientific and astronomical activities at the Dr. Mostafa Mahmoud Association.

Then as an astronomer researcher, and as a supervisor at the Planetarium at the Kuwait Science Club, and then as a delegate from the Kuwait Foundation for the Advancement of Science. He also became a member of the official committee for the reconnaissance and sighting of crescent moon, astronomical calculations, and timings in the Arab Republic of Egypt between 1988 and 1994. Fikri worked as a teacher of astronomy and astrophysics at the Faculty of Science at Cairo University between 1991 and 1994.

He taught basic physics at the College of Technological Studies in Kuwait between 1998 and 2001.

== Activities and conferences ==
- Participated in the International School No. 21 for Young Astronomers, which was held at Cairo University, in cooperation with the Ministry of Scientific Research and Technology, between September 28 and October 8, 1994.
- Participated in a number of international planetarium conferences held in Spain (2004), Australia (2006), the United States (2008 and 2012), China (2014), and was chosen as Director of the International Conference on Planetariums, which was held at the Bibliotheca Alexandrina in the summer of 2010.
- Participated in the meeting of science centers for Mediterranean Countries, which was held in Italy in 2005.
- Participated as a lecturer and coordinator in the official meeting of the board of directors of the International Federation of Planetariums, which was held in Brazil in 2007, in Moscow in 2011, and in Mexico in 2018.
- Participated in the general meeting of the conference and activities of the Arab Union for Astronomy and Space Sciences in Dubai (2006), Algeria (2009), Sudan (2011), Lebanon (2014), and South Africa 2016).

== His writings ==
Fikri wrote many books, ranging from novels, scientific books, and children's stories, including:

- The Rock (Arabic: Alhajar), a novel published by Dar El-Oumma Publishing House, in 2016
- A Special Sky (Arabic: sama' khasa), a children's story published by Shagara Publishing House, in 2016

== Awards ==
Fikri was nominated for the Katara Prize for Arabic Novel at its seventh session for his novel The Rock, in 2021.
