= Omer Blaes =

American astrophysicist

- Born: April 30, 1961 (age 65)
- Education: Queen Mary University of London (BSc); International School for Advanced Studies (MPhil, DPhil)
- Scientific career
- Fields: Theoretical astrophysics
- Workplaces: University of California, Santa Barbara
- Thesis: The Stability of Thick Accretion Disks (1986)
- Doctoral advisor: Marek Abramowicz
- Doctoral students: Eric Agol; Shane Davis

Omer Michael Blaes (born April 30, 1961) is an American astrophysicist. He is a professor of physics at University of California, Santa Barbara.

== Early life and education ==
Blaes was born April 30, 1961. He completed a BSc with first class honors in astrophysics at Queen Mary University of London in August 1983. He earned a MPhil in physics, cum laude, from the International School for Advanced Studies (SISSA) in October 1985. He completed a PhD in physics at SISSA in September 1986. His doctoral advisor was Marek Abramowicz. Blaes' dissertation was titled The Stability of Thick Accretion Disks. Blaes was the Chaim Weizmann Research Fellow in Theoretical Physics at California Institute of Technology from October 1, 1986, to September 30, 1989. He was a research associate at the Canadian Institute for Theoretical Astrophysics from October 12, 1989, to August 31, 1993.

== Career ==
On September 1, 1993, Blaes became an assistant professor in the department of physics at University of California, Santa Barbara (UCSB). He became an associate professor in 1998 and a professor at UCSB on July 1, 2004. Blaes served as chair of the UCSB physics department from July 1, 2010, to June 30, 2013. His research focuses on theoretical astrophysics (X- and gamma-ray astronomy) and compact objects (white dwarfs, neutron stars, and black holes). Much of his work in astrophysics focuses on the physics of accretion on black holes. He has looked at magneto rotational instability (MRI) and MRI turbulence in the innermost parts of accretion disks.

Omer oversees the outlist of the committee for sexual-orientation and gender minorities in astronomy in the American Astronomical Society.

== Personal life ==
Blaes came out as gay at the age of 28 while he was a postdoctoral researcher in Toronto. Blaes was married to his husband before the 2008 California Proposition 8.
