= Omar Rodríguez (disambiguation) =

Omar Rodríguez-López (born 1975) is an American guitarist, songwriter, producer and filmmaker

Omar Rodríguez may refer to:

== People ==
- Omar Rodríguez Cisneros (born 1959), Mexican politician
- Omar Rodríguez (footballer) (born 1981), Colombian footballer
- Omar Rodríguez Saludes (fl. 1995–2003), Cuban dissent journalist

== Music ==
- Omar Rodríguez-López discography
- Omar Rodriguez Lopez Group, 2005 band headed by the American musician
- El Grupo Nuevo de Omar Rodriguez Lopez, 2006 band headed by the American musician
- Omar Rodriguez (album), 2005 album by the American musician
- Omar Rodriguez Lopez & John Frusciante, 2010 album

== See also ==
- Anel Omar Rodríguez (died 2009), Panamanian politician
