= Omar Moussa =

Omar Moussa may refer to:

- Omar Moussa (runner) (born 1961), Djiboutian long-distance runner
- Omar Moussa (footballer) (born 1997), Burundian football player
