= Omar Narváez =

Omar Narváez may refer to:

- Omar Narváez (boxer) (born 1975), Argentine boxer
- Omar Narváez (baseball) (born 1992), Venezuelan baseball catcher
