= Omar Tate =

American chef, artist, and social activist

- Born: Philadelphia, Pennsylvania, U.S.
- Education: Culinary School
- Spouse: Cybille St.Aude-Tate
- Culinary career
- Cooking style: Black culinary traditions
- Current restaurant: Honeysuckle Provisions (2022-present)
- Award won: Esquire Magazine's Best New Chefs in America (2020)

Omar Tate is an American chef, artist, and social activist known for his approach to Black culinary traditions and his efforts to highlight and preserve African American foodways. His work blends food, art, and history, aiming to create a deeper understanding of Black culture through culinary experiences.

== Early life and education ==
Omar Tate was born and raised in Philadelphia, Pennsylvania. His upbringing in a predominantly Black community deeply influenced his perspective on food and culture. Tate developed an early interest in cooking, which he pursued further by working in various kitchens and attending culinary school.

== Culinary career ==
Tate's culinary journey has been marked by his dedication to exploring and celebrating black culinary traditions. He has worked in several notable restaurants across the United States, gaining experience and honing his skills. However, it was his unique approach to combining food with art and storytelling that set him apart in the culinary world.

== Honeysuckle projects ==
In 2017, Tate founded Honeysuckle, a series of pop-up dinners and events that serve as a platform to explore the intersections of food, history, and culture. Honeysuckle aims to reclaim and honor Black culinary traditions, presenting them in innovative and thought-provoking ways.

The pop-ups are more than just dining experiences; they are immersive events that include visual art, music, and storytelling. Through Honeysuckle, Tate addresses themes such as African American history, the impact of the African diaspora, and the role of food in cultural identity.

== Awards and recognition ==
Omar Tate's work has garnered significant attention and acclaim. He was named one of Esquire Magazine's Best New Chefs in America in 2020. He was also recognized by TIME Magazine as one of the Next 100 Most Influential People in 2021. His innovative approach and commitment to social justice through food have made him a prominent figure in the culinary world.

== Social impact and advocacy ==
Beyond his culinary achievements, Tate is a passionate advocate for social justice and community empowerment. He uses his platform to address issues such as food insecurity, racial inequality, and the importance of preserving Black cultural heritage. His work with Honeysuckle extends beyond pop-ups; it includes initiatives to support and uplift Black communities through food education and access.

In 2021, Tate announced plans to open a community center and market under the Honeysuckle brand in West Philadelphia. This space aims to provide fresh, healthy food options and educational programs to the local community, continuing his mission of using food as a tool for social change.

== Personal life ==
Omar Tate is known for his deep connection to his roots and his dedication to family and community.
