= Omar Hernandez =

Omar Hernandez may refer to:

- Omar Hernández (born 1962), Colombian cyclist
- Omar Hernández (baseball)
- Omar Hernandez (soccer) (born 2001), American soccer player
