= Omar Mendoza =

Omar Mendoza may refer to:

- Omar Mendoza (footballer), (born 1988), Mexican footballer
- Omar Mendoza (cyclist) (born 1989), Colombian cyclist
