= Omar Suleiman =

Omar Suleiman, Souleyman, or Soliman (Arabic: عمر سليمان) may refer to:

- Omar Suleiman (politician) (1936–2012), Egyptian army general, politician, diplomat, and intelligence officer
- Omar Suleiman Adam, Sudanese politician
- Omar Souleyman (born 1966), Syrian singer
- Omar Soliman (born 1982), American businessman
- Omar Suleiman (imam) (born 1986), American imam and activist
