= Omar de Jesús =

Ecuadorian footballer (born 1976)

Omar de Jesus
Personal information
- Full name: Omar Andres de Jesus Borja
- Date of birth: 29 February 1976 (age 50)
- Place of birth: Quito, Pichincha, Ecuador
- Height: 1.71 m (5 ft 7 in)
- Position: Right-back

Team information
- Current team: Barcelona Sporting Club
- Number: 4

Senior career*
Years	Team	Apps	(Gls)
1993–2002	SD Aucas	289	(13)
2003–2007	El Nacional	163	(7)
2008–present	Barcelona SC	67	(2)

International career^{‡}
2006–	Ecuador	15	(0)
- * Club domestic league appearances and goals as of 12 July 2010 ‡ National team caps and goals as of 4 April 2010

Omar Andres de Jesus Borja (born 29 February 1976) is an Ecuadorian footballer who plays club football for Barcelona Sporting Club of Guayaquil.

== Club career ==
He started his career with Sociedad Deportiva Aucas, and went on to feature in over 280 caps for the Quito side. In 2002, he switched to rivals Club Deportivo El Nacional, the military team. It was here where he began to impress with his speed and accurate passing skills. He was for a long time considered Ecuador's best right-back, alongside Ulises de la Cruz.

In December 2007, Omar transferred, alongside seven other national players, to Barcelona SC.

== International career ==
He began playing for Ecuador national team in 2006 under Colombian coach Luis Fernando Suarez. He also featured in several early 2006 friendlies in preparation for the Copa América 2007. de Jesus has currently made 5 appearances in the 2010 FIFA World Cup qualifying campaign, starting against Peru, Argentina, and Colombia. Uruguay and Venezuela
