= Omar Ahmed (disambiguation) =

Omar Ahmed (born 1979) is an amateur boxer from Kenya.

Omar Ahmed or Omar Ahmad may also refer to:

- Omar Ahmed (born 1978), better known as Robert Kipkoech Cheruiyot, Kenyan long-distance runner
- Omar Ahmed (South African politician), former member of the National Assembly of South Africa
- Omar Ahmad (born 1959), founder of the Council on American-Islamic Relations
- Omar Ahmad (politician) (1964–2011), American Internet entrepreneur and politician
- Omar Emboirik Ahmed (born 1956), Sahrawi ambassador to Venezuela
- Omar Ahmed Wais, Djiboutian politician

== See also ==
- Ahmed Omar, Lebanese-born Qatari footballer
- Ahmed Omar (cyclist) (born 1933), Moroccan cyclist
