= Collaborative Fusion =

- Type: Subsidiary
- Industry: Incident Management
- Founded: 2001; 25 years ago
- Founder: Bryan Kaplan and Atila Omer
- Fate: Acquired by Intermedix Corporation in 2011
- Successor: Juvare, LLC
- Headquarters: Pittsburgh (2011–2018); Atlanta (2018–present), United States
- Products: Software
- Owner: Thomas H. Lee Partners
- Parent: Juvare, LLC
- Website: www.juvare.com

Collaborative Fusion, Inc. (CFI) was a Pittsburgh, Pennsylvania-based provider of ESAR-VHP and incident management software for coordination of emergency personnel. Collaborative Fusion is now a wholly owned subsidiary of Juvare, LLC, a firm owned by private equity firm Thomas H. Lee Partners.

== History ==
CFI was founded in 2001; its president and vice president were founders Atila Omer and Bryan Kaplan, respectively. Omer and Kaplan were both alumni of Carnegie Mellon University. Prior to attending Carnegie Mellon, Kaplan graduated from the Harvard-Westlake School in Los Angeles. Omer, a graduate of Wayne State University, previously worked at JPMorgan Chase before attending Carnegie Mellon's MBA program and subsequently co-founding Collaborative Fusion.

At the beginning of 2008, CFI moved into its new corporate headquarters offices on 5849 Forbes Avenue in Squirrel Hill, Pennsylvania.

=== Juvare acquisition ===
On September 19, 2011, the Intermedix Corporation, a Florida-based healthcare technology provider, announced that it had acquired Collaborative Fusion. Following the spin-off of Intermedix Corporation and Juvare, LLC in May, 2018, Collaborative Fusion, Inc. became a wholly owned subsidiary of Juvare, LLC, a firm owned by private equity firm Thomas H. Lee Partners.

== Services ==
Headquartered in Atlanta, Georgia, Juvare began operations in 2018. The company operates on a global scale, working with emergency and incident response teams from federal, state, and local agencies. In an emergency, Juvare solutions are used by incident management teams to coordinate and respond to natural and man-made disasters, providing solutions to emergency management and incident team members.

Juvare’s platform solutions are used in multiple industries such as: aviation, corporate enterprise, education, emergency and incident management, energy and utilities, federal agencies, government defense, healthcare, public health, state and local government agencies, and transportation.

Juvare’s WebEOC platform is the most widely used incident management solution in the industry. The system was used to help coordinate and prepare EMS in Atlanta, Georgia, for Super Bowl LIII, held on Feb. 3, 2019, when over 1 million visitors came to the city. Using Juvare’s solution, key personnel were able to plan for the event, monitor incidents, and relay pertinent information to EMS (emergency medical services), firefighters, hospital staff, state and local police, and federal government agencies regarding emergencies and crisis incidents, also helping to coordinate supplies and labor power to specific locations, and ambulances to local hospitals.

Other Juvare solutions include:

- CORES HAN, a high-volume mass alert platform
- CORES RMS, which helps coordinate volunteer personnel
- eICS Electronic Incident Command System
- EMTrack, a patient and population tracking solution
- EMResource, a management platform for healthcare and emergency resources
- Fleeteyes, used for tracking and accessing emergency management fleet vehicles

== Clients ==
Past and present clients of CFI included local, state, and federal government agencies in the United States. The Department of Health and Human Services awarded CFI contracts for disaster relief in the aftermath of Hurricanes Katrina and Rita in 2005. They also have developed and support technology programs for state governments, including the State of California's Medical Volunteer System. CFI also administers a number of federally mandated ESAR-VHP programs for state governments.

== Accolades ==
CFI was selected as one of the "50 Best Places to Work in Western Pennsylvania" in 2007, 2008, 2009, and 2010 by the Pittsburgh Business Times, as well as #31 of the "Top 50 Best Places to Work in Western Pennsylvania with Under 50 Employees" by the Pittsburgh Post-Gazette.
