= Omar Degan =

Italian-born Somali architect, curator and academic

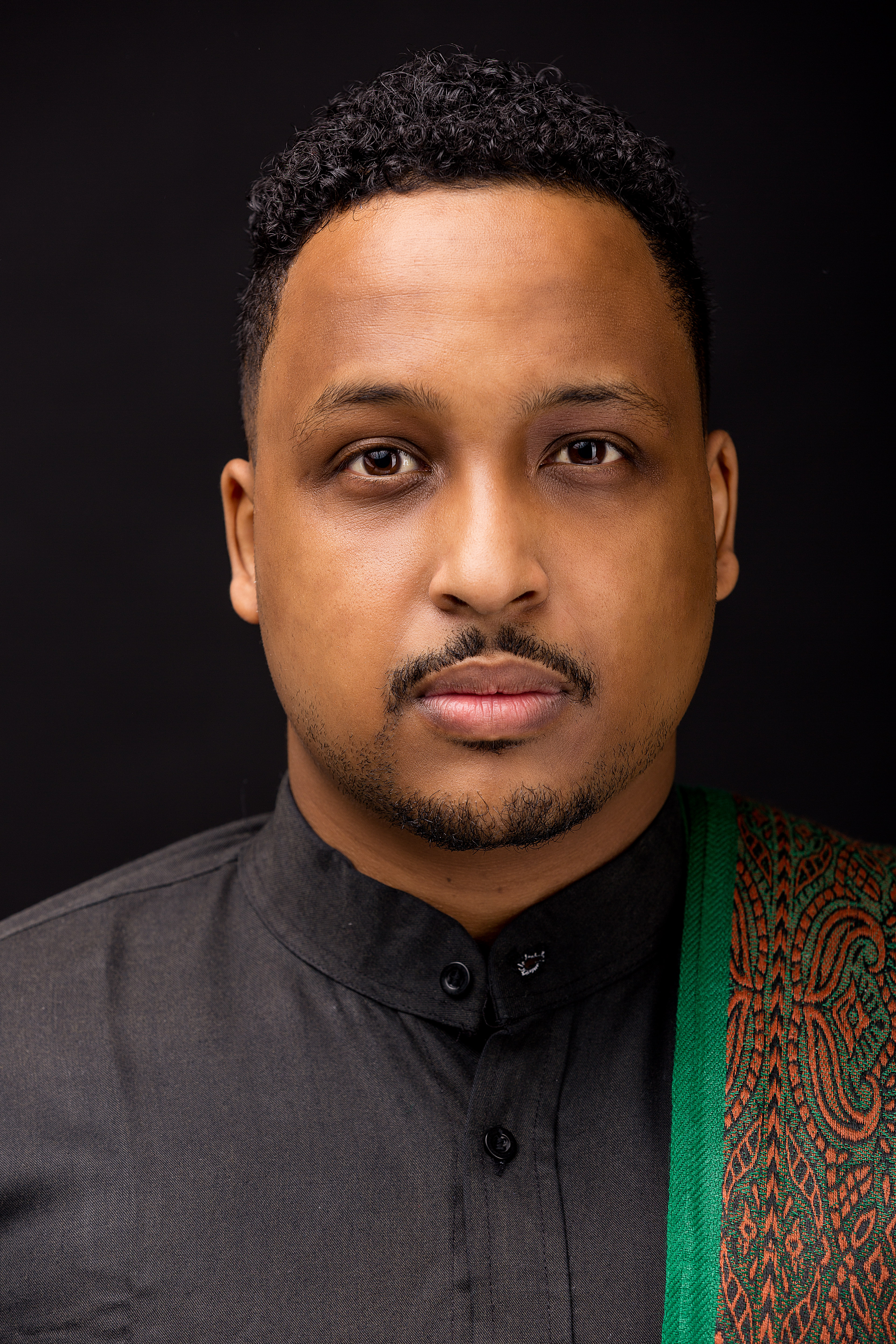
- Degan in 2024
- Born: 1990 (age 35–36); Italy
- Education: Politecnico di Torino; Chinese University of Hong Kong
- Occupations: Architect, curator, academic
- Known for: Founder and inaugural curator of the Pan-African Biennale; principal of DO Architecture Group; work on architecture in fragile contexts
- Awards: Obama Foundation Leaders Africa fellow (2022)
- Website: www.doarchitecturegroup.com www.panafricanbiennale.org

Omar Degan (born June 1990) is an Italian-born Somali architect, curator and academic whose work focuses on post-conflict reconstruction, urban resilience and architecture in fragile contexts. He is the founder and inaugural curator of the Pan-African Biennale (PAB), a continent-wide platform dedicated to architecture and spatial practices across Africa, and the principal and founder of DO Architecture Group, an international practice working in crisis-affected environments.

Degan is known for his work across Africa, particularly in the Horn of Africa, where he specialises in projects for marginalised communities and explores how cultural identity, place-making and climate-responsive design shape social and spatial recovery. His projects and essays on architecture in Somalia and African cities have been published in international media including The New York Times, Reuters, Wallpaper*, Azure and ArchDaily.

== Early life and education ==
Degan was born in Italy to Somali and Italian parents in June 1990. He grew up in the Italian Alps and maintained close ties with the Somali diaspora community.

He studied architecture at the Politecnico di Torino, later completing a master's degree in Architecture for Sustainability between Turin and the Chinese University of Hong Kong, followed by postgraduate studies in emergency architecture and developing countries. During this period he developed an interest in informal settlements, urban inequality and the relationship between cultural identity and the built environment.

== Career ==
=== Early work ===
Following graduate school, Degan worked on projects in informal settlements in Buenos Aires and Hong Kong, focusing on upgrading precarious urban areas and community infrastructure. In 2017 he relocated to Mogadishu, part of a wave of young diaspora Somalis returning to participate in the country’s reconstruction.

=== DO Architecture Group ===
Degan is the principal and founder of DO Architecture Group, an international architecture and research practice with offices in Mogadishu, Italy and the United States. The firm specialises in architecture for fragile and crisis-affected contexts, with work ranging from small-scale community buildings and schools to memorials, cultural venues and housing.

His projects in Somalia include schools, neighbourhood centres and hospitality spaces that draw on local materials and traditional building forms. The Salsabiil multifunctional building and later restaurant projects in Mogadishu have been described as architectural celebrations of Somali cultural identity. In 2021, in response to pressures on the country’s health system, he designed a portable rural clinic intended to improve access to medical care in remote areas.

Degan has described his practice as using architecture as a tool for “resilience, identity and justice”, emphasising low-cost, climate-responsive solutions and community participation.

=== Memorial projects ===
In 2017, Degan gained international attention for his proposal for a memorial to the victims of the 14 October 2017 Mogadishu bombings. The memorial design was conceived not only as a site of remembrance but also as a civic space for gathering and reflection.

=== Writing and publications ===
In 2020 Degan self-published Mogadishu Through the Eyes of an Architect, a photographic and critical survey of the city’s architecture and urban transformations. The book documents historical buildings, contemporary construction and everyday spatial practices in Mogadishu.

He has also contributed essays and opinion pieces on African architecture, heritage and urban resilience to platforms such as Azure Magazine and Geeska Africa.

== Curatorial work and the Pan-African Biennale ==
Degan is the founder and inaugural curator of the Pan-African Biennale, a continental architecture biennale that will rotate between African cities every two years. The inaugural edition, scheduled to open in Nairobi, Kenya, in 2026.

The Biennale’s theme, “From Fragility to Resilience”, positions African cities often described as fragile as sites of knowledge for global debates on climate change, displacement and social justice. International coverage has presented the event as the first continent-wide architecture biennale led from within Africa, with exhibitions planned from all 54 African countries and the African diaspora.

== Academic and leadership roles ==
Degan has held academic positions in architecture and design, including as Assistant Professor of Architecture at Kendall College of Art and Design (KCAD), Ferris State University, in Grand Rapids, Michigan. He also thought architecture at Auburn University in Auburn Alabama.

In 2022 he was selected as a Leaders Africa fellow by the Obama Foundation, which recognised his work on architecture, sustainability and resilience in fragile contexts. The Pan-African Biennale describes him as “an internationally recognised architect, curator and global expert on architecture in fragile contexts”.

Degan has delivered lectures and keynotes internationally, and in 2018 he presented a TEDx talk titled “Architecture, Identity and Reconstructing Somalia”, in which he discussed the role of culture and tradition in post-conflict rebuilding.

== Selected works ==
- Memorial proposal for the 14 October 2017 Mogadishu bombings, Mogadishu, Somalia (2017)
- Salsabiil multifunctional building and restaurant, Mogadishu (c. 2020)
- Portable rural clinic prototype, Somalia (2021)
- Mogadishu Through the Eyes of an Architect (book, 2020)
- Founder and inaugural curator, Pan-African Biennale, Nairobi 2026
