= Omar Mbwana Zonga =

Kenyan politician

Omar Mbwana Zonga is a Kenyan politician. He belongs to the Orange Democratic Movement and was elected to represent the Msambweni Constituency in the National Assembly of Kenya since the 2007 Kenyan parliamentary election.
