= Omar Sharif Kale =

Somali footballer (born 2001)

Personal information
- Full name: Omar Sharif Kale
- Date of birth: 21 June 2001 (age 25)
- Place of birth: Somalia
- Position: Defender

Senior career*
Years	Team	Apps	(Gls)
- Horseed

International career^{‡}
2019–	Somalia	3	(0)
- * Club domestic league appearances and goals as of 23:30, 12 January 2020 (UTC) ‡ National team caps and goals as of 23:30, 12 January 2020 (UTC)

Omar Sharif Kale (born 21 June 2001) is a Somali footballer who plays as a defender for Horseed.

== Club career ==
During the 2020–21 CAF Confederation Cup, Kale made two appearances for Horseed against Libyan club Al-Ittihad.

== International career ==
On 9 December 2019, Kale made his debut for Somalia in a 2–0 loss against Uganda in the 2019 CECAFA Cup.
