= Omar Ashmawy =

American lawyer

Omar Ashmawy is staff director and chief counsel of the Office of Congressional Ethics.

He was born in Jersey City but grew up in Westfield, New Jersey. His father was an immigrant from Egypt. His mother was an immigrant from Italy. His mother was Catholic, but Ashmawy was reared in his father's faith tradition and grew up as a practicing Muslim.

Ashmawy attended George Washington University, earning both an undergraduate and a law degree. He received a Bachelor of Arts degree in political science and later earned a Juris Doctor from George Washington University Law School. He joined the United States Air Force after law school, serving in the Judge Advocate General's Corps (JAG). During his eight years of active duty service, Ashmawy worked as both a prosecutor and defense counsel in criminal and administrative cases before joining the Office of Military Commissions. As JAG staff, he was one of the four prosecutors on the Salim Hamdan terrorism case. The case was among the first military commission prosecutions litigated at Guantánamo Bay after the September 11 attacks.

In September 2022, Ashmawy was arrested for, and would later be charged with, Driving under the influence (DUI).

== Views on Guantánamo Bay ==
In 2021, Ashmawy publicly called for the closure of the Guantánamo Bay detention camp, arguing that the military commissions process had failed to deliver timely justice. Reflecting on his experience as a prosecutor, he described the prolonged proceedings as "absurd and un-American".
