= Oumar Toure =

Oumar Toure may refer to:

- Oumar Toure (swimmer) (born 1996), Malian swimmer
- Oumar Toure (footballer) (born 1998), Guinean footballer
