= Oumar Traoré =

Oumar Traoré can refer to:

- Oumar Traoré (footballer, born 2002), Malian footballer
- Oumar Traoré (Senegalese footballer) (born 1975)
- Omar Haktab Traoré (born 1998), German footballer
