= Omar Allibhoy =

Spanish chef

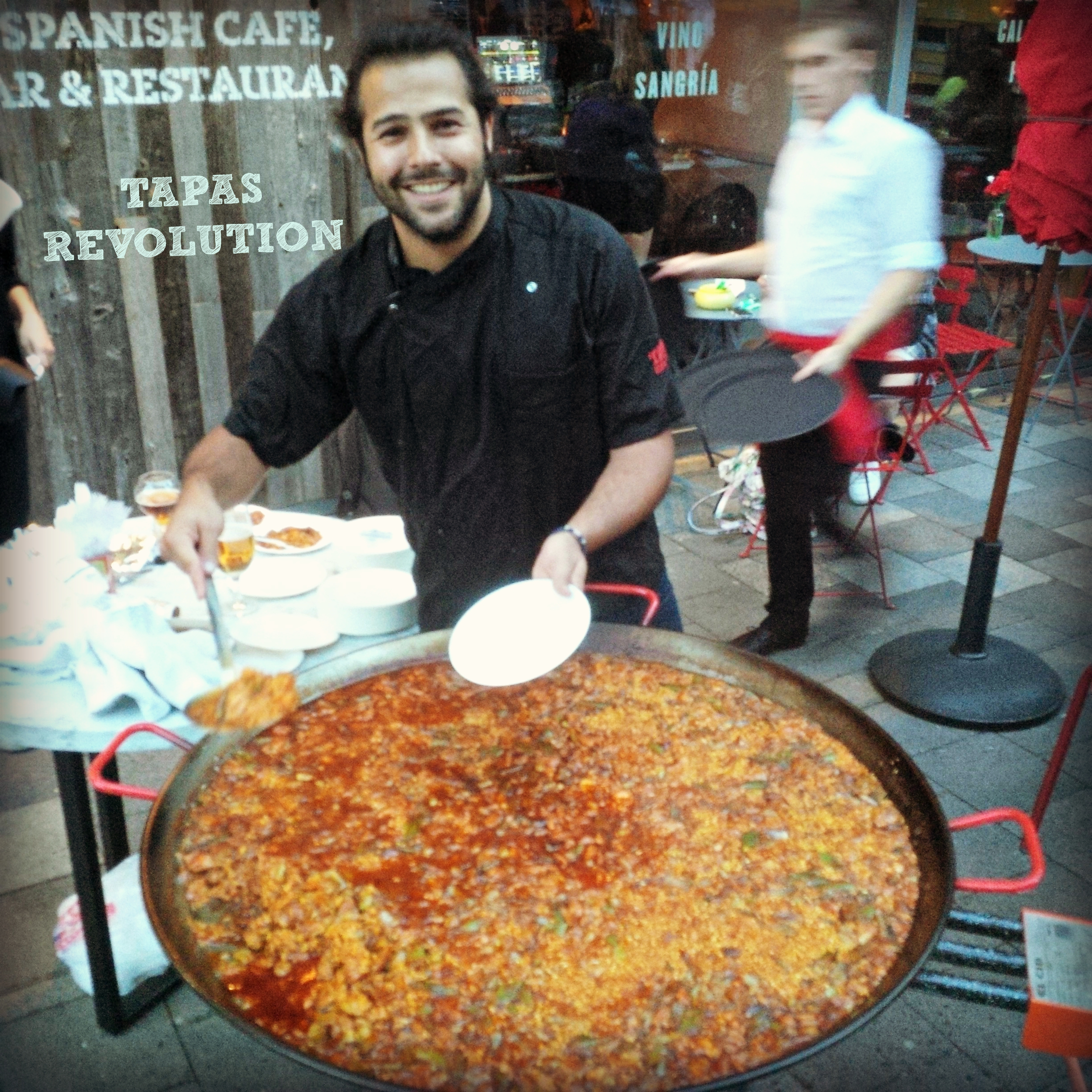
- Omar Allibhoy, 2015
- Born: January 1984 (age 42); Madrid, Spain
- Culinary career
- Current restaurant: Tapas Revolution (multiple locations)
- Previous restaurant: El Pirata Detapas
- Award(s) won: British Travel & Hospitality Hall of Fame

Omar Allibhoy is a Spanish/Indian celebrity chef. He has previously worked at elBulli under Ferran Adrià and Maze under Jason Atherton. He is the founder of the Tapas Revolution group. He opened his first restaurant at Westfield London in 2011.

== Early life and education ==
Omar Allibhoy was born near Madrid, Spain and began to cook when he was five years old. He is of Indian Muslim descent through his father's side (hence his Muslim name and surname) and Spanish through his mother's side.

He started taking evening cooking classes while still at school.

== Career ==
After working at several restaurants near where he lived, he gained a position at elBulli under Ferran Adrià and worked there for two years. In 2008, he joined the team at Gordon Ramsay's Maze under head chef Jason Atherton. He had originally come to the UK to learn English, as he felt this was necessary to learn how to cook other cuisines. Ramsay described him as the "Antonio Banderas of cooking". After he left, he started the restaurant El Pirata Detapas in Mayfair.

He then founded the Tapas Revolution restaurant group, wanting to promote Spanish cuisine in the UK as he felt that there were only poor examples available at the time, admitting that this was the complete opposite to his original objective in the UK. His first location was opened at Westfield London in Shepherd's Bush in 2011, and by 2015 he had three locations with plans to open two more. He wrote a cookbook, also entitled Tapas Revolution, published by Ebury Press. This was part of his objective to promote the home cooking of Spanish tapas style dishes in the UK.

He took part in the Rumble in the Kitchen charity boxing event, where he fought Stefan Chomka, the deputy editor of Restaurant magazine. The card also featured Marcus Wareing, Monica Galetti and Will Holland. At the British Travel & Hospitality Hall of Fame event in April 2015, he was named the Young Entrepreneur inductee for his work with the Tapas Revolution Group.
