= Omar Sandoval =

Chilean footballer (born 1955)

Personal information
- Full name: José Omar Sandoval Barthelemiez
- Date of birth: 14 July 1955 (age 71)
- Place of birth: Santiago, Chile
- Position: Midfielder

Youth career
- Universidad Católica

Senior career*
Years	Team	Apps	(Gls)
1975–1977	Universidad Católica	14	(0)
1976	→ O'Higgins (loan)		
1977–1978	Cruz Azul		
1978–1979	Tecos		

Managerial career
- 2001–2002: Tecos
- * Club domestic league appearances and goals

José Omar Sandoval Barthelemiez (born 14 July 1955), known as Omar Sandoval, is a Chilean former professional footballer who played as a defender for clubs in Chile and Mexico.

== Club career ==
A product of Universidad Católica youth system, Sandoval coincided with players such as Nelson Sanhueza, Mario Maldonado, Jorge Aravena and Gustavo Moscoso. In the 1977 season, he made fourteen appearances.

He also played on loan at O'Higgins in the 1976 season, getting promotion to the Chilean Primera División.

He came to Mexico at the age of twenty two and played for Cruz Azul and Tecos. With Tecos, they faced New York Cosmos, where played Franz Beckenbauer and made a tour in Europe, winning a friendly tournament where also took part the Republic of Ireland national team and the Spanish club Levante, becoming the first Mexican club to win a tournament in that continent. At the same club, he coincided with players such his compatriot Mario Maldonado and the Brazilian Geraldo Cândido.

== Coaching career ==
In November 2001, he assumed as coach of Tecos in the 2001 Torneo Invierno, where he coached his compatriot Reinaldo Navia. On 27 January 2002, he left the club.

He has also worked as football coach at the university level at the National Autonomous University of Mexico.

== Personal life ==
He settled in Guadalajara, Mexico, got married and became a business owner in activities such as automotive services and real state.

He has six children.
