= Omar Ali =

Omar Ali may refer to:

- Sheikh Omar Ali (1931–2015), West Bengali physician and politician
- Omar Ali (poet) (1939–2015), Bangladeshi poet
- Abu Saeed Muhammad Omar Ali (1945–2010), Bangladeshi Islamic scholar, author, teacher, and translator
- Omar Said Ali (born 1945), Kurdish politician
- Omar A. Ali, Somali entrepreneur
- Omar H. Ali (born 1971), historian of the African diaspora
