= Ömer Lütfi Yasan =

Turkish politician

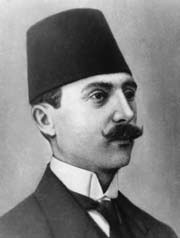
- Born: 1878; Merzifon, Ottoman Empire
- Died: 12 March 1956 (aged 77–78); Istanbul, Turkey
- Burial place: near Zühtü Paşa Camii
- Military career
- Allegiance: Ottoman Empire
- Service years: Ottoman Empire: December 30, 1898 – March 26, 1920
- Rank: Brigadier
- Commands: Vice Superintendent of Edirne Military High School, Superintendent of Kuleli Military High School, Superintendent of Military Medical High School, Vice President of Military Medical High School, Department of the General Headquarters, Inspector of the Rear Area of the Third Army, Head of the Administration of Yildirim Army Group, War Coal Center
- Conflicts: Italo-Turkish War; Balkan Wars; First World War
- Other work: Member of the GNAT (Amasya); Minister of the Public Works

Ömer Lütfi Yasan (1878; Merzifon - March 12, 1956; Istanbul) was a Turkish officer of the Ottoman Army, and a politician of the Republic of Turkey. He became the Minister of the Public Works (December 27, 1920 – November 14, 1921) in the cabinet of Mustafa Kemal Pasha (Atatürk).

== Medals and decorations ==
- Medal of Independence with Green Ribbon
