= Omar Ali Saifuddin =

Omar Ali Saifuddin is the name of three Sultans of Brunei:

- Omar Ali Saifuddin I (reigned 1762-1795)
- Omar Ali Saifuddin II (reigned 1829-1852)
- Omar Ali Saifuddien III (reigned 1950-1967)
