= Oumar Sidibé =

Oumar Sidibé may refer to:

- Oumar Sidibé (footballer, born 1990), Malian football midfielder
- Oumar Sidibé (footballer, born 2001), French football winger
