= Omar García =

Omar García is the name of:

- Omar García Harfuch (born 1982), Mexican public official, Secretary of Security and Civilian Protection (2024–)
- Omar García (footballer, born 1939), Argentine footballer
- Omar García (footballer, born 1983), Spanish footballer
