= Muhammad Umar (disambiguation) =

Muhammad Umar (died 2013) was the founder and first leader of the Taliban.

Muhammad Umar may refer to:

- Mohammad Umar (Sindh cricketer) (born 1999), Pakistani cricketer for Karachi Whites and Sindh
- Mohammad Umar (Lahore Blues cricketer) (born 1997), Pakistani cricketer for Lahore Blues
- Muhammad Umar (Afghan minister of defense)
- Muhammad Umar, perpetrator of the 2025 Delhi car explosion
- Mohammed Umar, Ghanaian footballer
- Muhammad Umer, Pakistani footballer

== See also ==
- Muhammad Omar (disambiguation)
