= Oumar N'Diaye =

Oumar N'Diaye may refer to:

- Oumar N'Diaye (footballer born 1985), French-Mauritanian football player
- Oumar N'Diaye (footballer born 1988), Mauritanian football player
