= Omar Tall (soccer) =

Senegalese footballer

Personal information
- Date of birth: 2 July 1993 (age 33)
- Place of birth: Dakar, Senegal
- Height: 1.87 m (6 ft 2 in)
- Position: Midfielder

Youth career
- Woodlands High School

College career
Years	Team	Apps	(Gls)
2011–2014	Hartford Hawks	64	(3)

Senior career*
Years	Team	Apps	(Gls)
2016–2017	Connecticut United		
2016	→ Stal Mielec (loan)	2	(0)
2018	MGKS Drzewica	13	(7)
2018–2019	RKS Radomsko	25	(7)
2021	Cartusia Kartuzy	10	(2)
2021–2022	Ogniwo Sopot	7	(8)
- * Club domestic league appearances and goals as of 11:32, 2 July 2024 (UTC)

Cheikhou Omar Ben Tall (born 2 July 1993), commonly known as Omar Tall, is a Senegalese footballer who plays as a midfielder.

== Career ==
Born in Senegal, Tall moved to America as a child and played soccer for Woodlands High School. He enrolled at the University of Hartford and played for their soccer team from 2011 to 2014.

He joined American Soccer League side Connecticut United in 2016, and was loaned to Polish I liga side Stal Mielec later the same year. He returned to America in early 2017, having made two league appearances in Poland. In 2021, he signed with a fifth-tier club Cartusia Kartuzy

== Career statistics ==
=== Club ===
As of matches played 27 November 2021.

Club	Season	League			Cup		Continental		Other		Total	
Club	Season	Division	Apps	Goals	Apps	Goals	Apps	Goals	Apps	Goals	Apps	Goals
Stal Mielec (loan)	2016–17	I liga	2	0	0	0	—		—		2	0
MGKS Drzewica	2017–18	Regional league	13	7	—		—		—		13	7
RKS Radomsko	2018–19	IV liga Łódź	16	5	—		—		—		16	5
RKS Radomsko	2019–20	III liga, gr. I	9	2	—		—		—		9	2
RKS Radomsko	Total		25	7	—		—		—		25	7
Cartusia Kartuzy	2020–21	IV liga Pomerania	10	2	—		—		—		10	2
Ogniwo Sopot	2021–22	Regional league	7	8	—		—		—		7	8
Career total			57	24	0	0	0	0	0	0	57	24

== Honours ==
RKS Radomsko

- IV liga Łódź: 2018–19
