= Omar Ibrahim Hammad =

Sudanese footballer (born 1986)

Omar Ibrahim
Personal information
- Full name: Omar Ibrahim Ali Hammad
- Date of birth: 5 December 1986 (age 39)
- Place of birth: Sudan
- Height: 1.76 m (5 ft 9 in)
- Position: Winger

Senior career*
Years	Team	Apps	(Gls)
?–2010	Al-Nil Al-Hasahesa	-	(-)
2010	Al Ahli	0	(0)
2010–2012	Al Arabi	12	(1)
2012–2016	Al-Sailiya		
2016–2017	Umm Salal		
- * Club domestic league appearances and goals

Omar Ibrahim Hammad is a Sudanese footballer who plays . He plays as a right winger.

== Club career statistics ==
Statistics accurate as of 21 August 2012

Club	Season	League	League		Cup^{1}		League Cup^{2}		Continental^{3}		Total	
Club	Season	League	Apps	Goals	Apps	Goals	Apps	Goals	Apps	Goals	Apps	Goals
Al-Ahli	2009–10	QSL	0	0								
Al-Ahli	Total		0	0								
Al-Arabi	2009–10	QSL	0	0								
Al-Arabi	2010–11	QSL	8	1								
Al-Arabi	2011–12	QSL	4	0								
Al-Arabi	Total		12	1								
Career total			12	1								

^{1}Includes Emir of Qatar Cup.

^{2}Includes Sheikh Jassem Cup.

^{3}Includes AFC Champions League.
