= Mohamed Akel =

Israeli footballer

Mohamed Akel محمد عقل
Personal information
- Full name: Mohamed Akel
- Date of birth: October 25, 1993 (age 33)
- Place of birth: Ar'ara, Israel
- Position: Striker

Team information
- Current team: Ihud Bnei Kafr Qara

Youth career
- Maccabi Netanya

Senior career*
Years	Team	Apps	(Gls)
2011–2014	Maccabi Netanya	5	(0)
2013–2014	→ Maccabi Daliyat al-Karmel	4	(1)
2014	→ F.C. Givat Olga	16	(1)
2014	Hapoel Hadera	1	(0)
2014–2017	Hapoel Bnei Ar'ara 'Ara	66	(46)
2015	→ Ihud Bnei Kafr Qara	11	(2)
2017–2018	Hapoel Umm al-Fahm	22	(1)
2018–2019	Hapoel Bnei Fureidis	21	(9)
2019–2021	Hapoel Bnei Ar'ara 'Ara	36	(3)
2021–2023	Ihud Bnei Kafr Qara	51	(13)
2023–	Hapoel Bnei Ar'ara 'Ara	0	(0)
2023	→ Hapoel Ihud Bnei Jatt	2	(0)
2024	→ Hapoel Qalansawe	14	(7)
2024–	→ Mashhad	8	(1)
- * Club domestic league appearances and goals

Mohamed Akel (Arabic: محمد عقل, Hebrew: מוחמד עקל; born October 25, 1993) is an Israeli footballer currently playing for Ihud Bnei Kafr Qara.

He made his debut for the senior side in a league game against Bnei Yehuda.
