= Omar Morales =

Omar Morales may refer to:

- Omar Morales (fighter) (born 1985), Venezuelan mixed martial artist
- Omar Morales (footballer, born 1988), Bolivian football defender
- Omar Treviño Morales (born 1974), Mexican drug lord
