= Omar Mussa =

Omar Mussa is the name of:

- Omar Mussa (footballer, born 1980), Burundian football forward
- Omar Mussa (footballer, born 2000), Burundian football midfielder, and son of above
