= Omar Figueroa =

Omar Figueroa may refer to:

- Omar Figueroa (politician), Belizean politician
- Omar Figueroa Jr. (born 1989), American boxer
