= Omar Alghanim =

Kuwaiti businessman

Omar Kutayba Alghanim (born 1973) is a Kuwaiti businessperson. He has been chairman of Gulf Bank and CEO of Alghanim Industries.

== Early life, education, career ==
Born in 1973 in Kuwait, Alghanim spent much of his youth in the United States. After he earned his undergraduate degree, he joined Morgan Stanley in London. After graduating Harvard Business School, at age 29 he moved from an investment banking training program at Morgan Stanley for the Alghanim family business in Kuwait. According to Spear's, he joined Alghanim Industries in 2003, a diversified conglomerate with branches including automotive, banking, consumer electronics, and oil in gas. He became CEO in 2005, and left in 2019.

In March 2013, Omar Kutayba Alghanim was appointed chairman of Kuwait’s Gulf Bank KSC. The appointment came after Mahmoud Al Nouri stepped down for health reasons.

He won the Arabian Business Businessman of the Year award in 2013, and Arabian Business then named him among the 100 Most Powerful Arabs of 2014.

In 2015, as CEO of Alghanim Industries and chairman of Gulf Bank, he won the Visionary of the Year Award at the CEO Middle East Awards held in Dubai.

In 2016, he received the Knowledge and Education Development CEO Excellence Award from the Middle East Excellence Awards Institute.

In June 2018, he succeeded Abdulaziz Abdulla Al Ghurair as head of the Family Business Council - Gulf.

In 2018, he was responsible for and signed an initiative agreement along with the UN High Commissioner for Refugees, Filippo Grandi, to raise $10 million and immediately donate $1.5 million to educate and train Syrian refugees.

As of 2019, he continued to control Alghanim Trading, which also had a stake in the Gulf Bank.

He ranked second of the seven Kuwaitis in the Gulf Business annual Arab Power list for 2020, ranking 32 overall, having ranked 34 the year prior. As of 2020, he remained chairman of the Gulf Bank. He was also a member of the United Nations High Commissioner for Refugees (UNHCR) MENA sustainability board.

As of 2021, he was working on a project for the Family Business Network (FBN), sitting on its board and chairing its Gulf chapter. He was also on the board of the NGO INJAZ Al-Arab, after co-founding the organization in 2002. Around 2021, he formed the impact investment fund Yakoa in London.
