= Umar Khan =

Umar Khan may refer to:

- Umar Khan of Malerkotla, ruler of an Indian princely state
- Umar Khan Jamali, Pakistani politician
- Umar Khan (umpire), Pakistani former umpire
- Umer Khan (cricketer) (born 1999), Pakistani cricketer
- Omar Khan (American football) (born 1977), American football executive
- Omar Ayub Khan (born 1970), Pakistani politician
- Omar Asghar Khan (1953–2002), Pakistani social activist, social scientist, economist and politician
- General Omar Khan, Yuan Dynasty general during the 1288 Battle of Bạch Đằng
- Omar Khan (businessman) (born 1959), Indian restaurant chain owner and owner of the Bradford Bulls
