= Omar Arellano =

David Andrade may refer to:

- Omar Arellano (footballer, born 1967), Mexican football manager and former midfielder
- Omar Arellano (footballer, born 1987), Mexican football midfielder
