= Omar El Bahraoui =

Moroccan politician

Omar El Bahraoui is a former mayor of Rabat, Morocco (2003 to 2009).

He was chair of Morocco's local government association and vice president of the African branch of the United Cities and Local Governments organization.

He was longlisted for the 2010 World Mayor award.
