= Omar al-Akel =

Syrian footballer (born 1980)

Omar Al-Akel عمر العاقل
Personal information
- Date of birth: April 11, 1980 (age 46)
- Place of birth: Damascus, Syria
- Height: 1.71 m (5 ft 7 1/2 in)
- Position: Midfielder

Team information
- Current team: Al-Wahda
- Number: 6

Youth career
- Al-Wahda

Senior career*
Years	Team	Apps	(Gls)
????–????	Al-Wahda		
????–2004	Al-Majd		
2004–2005	Hutteen		
2005	Al-Wahda		
2005–2006	Qardaha		
2006–2007	Al-Jaish		
2007–	Al-Wahda		
- * Club domestic league appearances and goals as of 29 March 2009 ‡ National team caps and goals as of 29 March 2009

Omar Al-akel (born April 11, 1980) is a Syrian footballer for Al-Wahda.
