= Omar Mohamed Omar =

Somali basketball player and coach

Omar Mohamed Omar (Somali: Cumar Maxamed Cumar, Arabic: عمر محمد عمر) (1970 – 25 December 2008), also known as Anyeelo, was a Somali basketball player and coach. He was coach of the Somali national team from 2007 until his death. A member and coach of the Somalia national basketball team, Omar died in a car crash in England on 25 December 2008. He was the father to five young children and was married to his Dutch wife.
