= Al 'Aylafun =

Neighbourhood in Sudan

Al 'Aylafun العليفون
- District
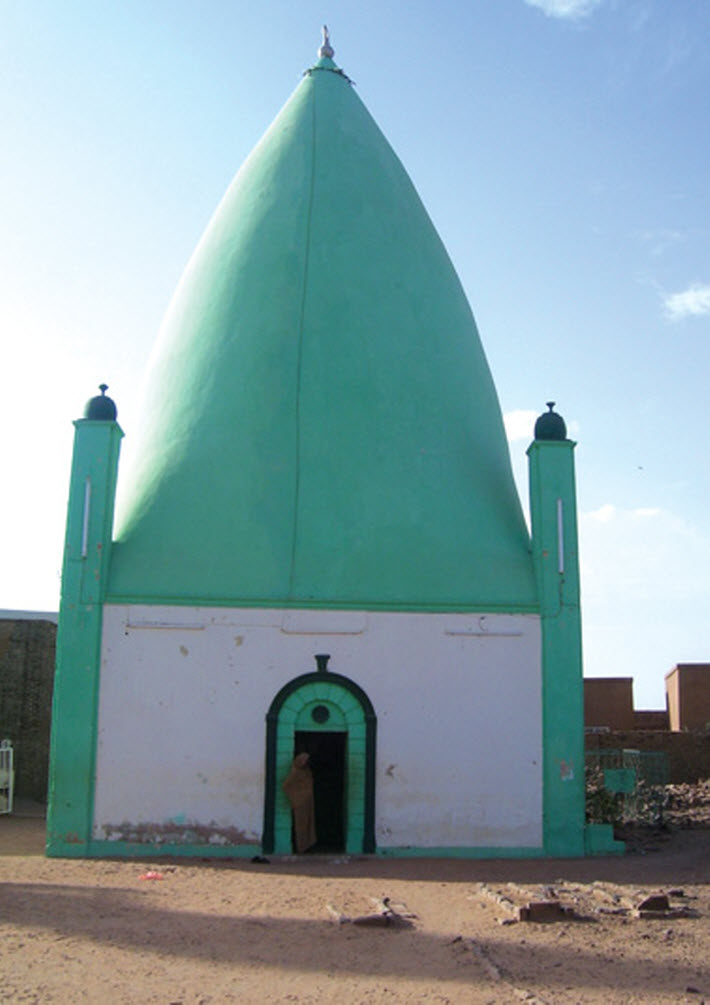
- Dome of Sheikh Idris Wad Arbab

- Location in Sudan
- Coordinates: 15°26′4.76″N 32°43′5.87″E
- Country: Sudan
- State: Khartoum
- City: Khartoum
- Elevation: 397 m (1,302 ft)

Population
  - Estimate (2009): 25,000
- Time zone: Central Africa Time, GMT + 3

Al 'Aylafun (Arabic: العليفون), or Al-Ailafoon or Al-Ailfoun, is a suburb district located 30 kilometres (19 mi) east of Khartoum, Sudan.

== Etymology ==
There are several narrations for how Al 'Aylafun got its name:

As per many Frankish and Arab references, Al 'Aylafun was initially a province of the Christian kingdom of Alodia, with its capital at Soba. The region was inhabited by various tribes, including the Anj and the Salmab. The descendants of these tribes still live in Al 'Aylafun, particularly in the Al-Duwaykhla neighbourhood. Due to its proximity to Soba, the region was called Ail Al-Fung, where 'Ail’ in the Funj language means 'slaves’. Over time, this name transformed into Al 'Aylafun.

Another narration comes from the Beja language as it says that the word consists of two syllables (Ila) and (Von). The first syllable of the name means white, but not pure white, and the second syllable of the name Von means Fung in the Beja language. This is because the letter Ain does not exist in the Beja language, so the name expresses The White Funj, which means that there are black Funj, and this may be a distinction between the Abdalab and what is known to be called the Funj of the Amara Dunqas dynasty.

== Location and demography ==
Al 'Aylafun is located 30 kilometres (19 mi) east of Khartoum, Sudan. It is bordered to the north by the village of Eastern Soba, which was built on the ruins of Soba. The old capital of the Kingdom of Alba, which is about 6 kilometres (3.7 mi) away from Al-Ailfoun, and to the south it is bordered by the Corps of Engineers training camp on the shore of the Blue Nile and the village of Al-Hudaybah, to the east the villages of Al-Fadniyah, Um Dawa Ban, Al-Samra and Karnos, and to the west the Blue Nile in the vicinity of the villages of Western Soba and the Petrie region. Al 'Aylafun is suitated at an elevation of 1,302 feet (397 m).

Al 'Aylafun has a population of about 25,000, comprising various tribes. The community, formed over centuries, is known as the Al 'Aylafun tribe. Most residents work in agriculture and trade, with many commuting to Khartoum for work. Al 'Aylafun is considered one of the oldest and most famous district in the region. It has enjoyed education and religious tendencies for quite some time, and was famous for its Khalawi for Quran memorisation centres.

The area is home to the Al 'Aylafun Oil Station and Al 'Aylafun military camp.

=== Sufism ===
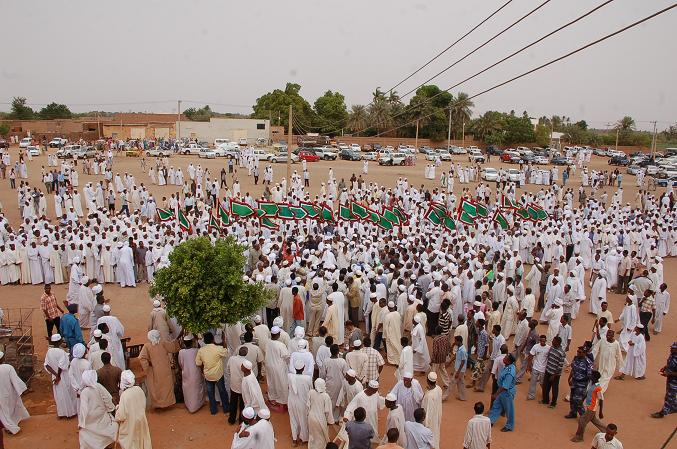
Sufism gathering in 2011

The most famous Sufi groups are the Qadiriyya, which is widespread in the region, represented by Sheikh Idris bin Muhammad al-Arbab, and the Samaniyya Order, represented by Sheikh Muhammad Wad al-Azirq, and Sheikh Idris (Al-Gharqan) al-Jabali, in the Umm Qahf region, south of Al 'Aylafun.

== History ==
A mass grave of conscripts, killed in 1998, was found at the Al 'Aylafun military camp. The conscripts were reportedly killed while trying to escape the base during the Eid al-Adha holidays. The government claimed 55 conscripts drowned, but opposition groups reported a higher death toll. The discovery is part of an investigation into the atrocities committed under the regime of ousted president Omar al-Bashir.

=== War in Sudan (2023–present) ===
Al 'Aylafun has been a site of conflict during the War in Sudan. On 6 October 2023, the Rapid Support Forces (RSF) took control of Al 'Aylafun, leading to the displacement of thousands of residents. The RSF and the army had bloody clashes, with the RSF claiming to have killed 120 army members and captured 70 others. The area’s infrastructure, including electricity, water, communications, and internet networks, was severely affected. Eyewitnesses reported looting of homes and shops, and theft of vehicles. The conflict has led to a significant humanitarian crisis.
